= Walt Disney Records discography =

This is a list of albums released by Walt Disney Records, including studio albums, soundtrack albums, compilation albums, and remix albums released by the label. Disney licensed its music to other labels from 1937 to 1956. The company started publishing its own music under Disneyland Records in 1956, eventually also adopting the Buena Vista label in 1959 for albums aimed at a slightly more adult audience and price-point (such as music from their live-action Westerns). Disneyland Records was renamed to Disneyland/Vista Records in 1971, Disneyland/Vista Records and Tapes in 1985, and its current branding, Walt Disney Records, in 1988.

== Albums ==
=== 1930s ===
Soundtrack	U.S. release date	Notes
Snow White and the Seven Dwarfs	1938	Original release as three 78 rpm singles by Victor Records. Re-released on CD on June 8, 1993. Re-released on CD with remastered audio on September 25, 2001.

=== 1940s ===
Title	U.S. release date	Notes
Pinocchio	February 9, 1940	Original release on February 9, 1940, as three 78 rpm singles from Victor Records. Re-issued on CD on June 9, 1992. Released on digital in 2006.
Fantasia	1940	Original release as an LP record (mono) in 1957. Re-released as LP record (stereo) in 1961. Re-released on CD with remastered audio in 1990.
Dumbo	1941	Original release as three 78 rpm singles/three 45 rpm singles by RCA Victor in 1949 Re-released on CD on September 16, 1997.
Bambi	1942	1949 (three 78 rpm singles), RCA Victor
Saludos Amigos	1942	1944 (three 78 rpm singles), Decca Records
The Three Caballeros	1944	1944 (three 78 rpm singles), Decca Records
Make Mine Music	1946	1946 (three 78 rpm singles), Columbia Records
Fun and Fancy Free	1947	1964 (LP record)
Melody Time	1948	
The Adventures of Ichabod and Mr. Toad	1949	1949 (78 rpm album/10-inch LP record), Decca Records
So Dear to My Heart	1949	1949 (4-record vinyl set, 78 rpm, Capitol Records). Music arranged and conducted by Billy May.

=== 1950s ===
Title	U.S. release date	Artist	Notes
Cinderella	February 4, 1950	Various	Originally released as four 78 rpm singles by RCA Records. Re-released on CD on February 4, 1997. Re-released as a special edition CD on October 4, 2005.
From Walt Disney's Cinderella : Bibbidi-Bobbidi-Boo	1950	Various	Released under the Official Mickey Mouse Club label.
Alice in Wonderland	July 28, 1951	Various	Originally released as an LP in 1951. Re-released on CD on February 2, 1998.
Zip-a-Dee-Doo-Dah / Laughing Place	1951	Various	Released by Golden Records
Peter Pan	February 5, 1953	Oliver Wallace	Originally released as an LP in 1953. Re-released on CD on September 9, 1997.
20,000 Leagues Under the Sea	1954	Various	Originally released in 1954 as a book-and-record set, issued as part of RCA Victor's Little Nipper series on two 45 rpm records. Released as an LP in 1963. Digital release on January 29, 2008. Released on CD in 2011 by Intrada Records.
The Animals And Clowns' Song / Who Am I?	1955	Jimmie Dodd, Mickey Mouse Club Chorus & Orchestra	Released under the Official Mickey Mouse Club label.
Anyone For Exploring? And The Mickey Mouse Newsreel Music	1955	Jimmie Dodd, Mickey Mouse Club Chorus & Orchestra	Released under the Official Mickey Mouse Club label.
Cinderella Work Song	1955	Various	Released under the Official Mickey Mouse Club label.
Corky And White Shadow	1955	Buddy Ebsen, Darlene Gillespie, George Bruns & Orchestra	Released under the Official Mickey Mouse Club label.
Fun With Music Vol. I	1955	Jimmie Dodd The Mouseketeers & The Mickey Mouse Club Chorus And Orchestra	Released under the Official Mickey Mouse Club label.
Fun With Music Vol. II	1955	Jimmie Dodd The Mouseketeers & The Mickey Mouse Club Chorus And Orchestra	Released under the Official Mickey Mouse Club label.
Hi To You And Do-Me-So	1955	Jimmie Dodd, Mickey Mouse Club Chorus & Orchestra	Released under the Official Mickey Mouse Club label.
Huckleberry Finn / Painting Aunt Polly's Fence	1955	The Sandpipers, Mitch Miller & Orchestra	Released under the Official Mickey Mouse Club label.
Jiminy Cricket Presents Walt Disney's Bongo	1955	Cliff Edwards	Released under Am-Par Records
Jiminy Cricket Sings 5 Mickey Mouse Club Songs	1955	Cliff Edwards & The Mouseketeers Chorus And Orchestra	Released under the Official Mickey Mouse Club label.
Lady and the Tramp	1955	Oliver Wallace	Originally released as an LP in 1955. Re-released on CD on September 9, 1997. Released on digital on September 26, 2006. Not to be confused with the 1972 Album of the same name
The Merry Mouseketeers / Talent Round Up	1955	Jimmie Dodd, The Merry Mouseketeers, Mickey Mouse Club Chorus & Orchestra	Released under the Official Mickey Mouse Club label.
Mickey Mouse Club March	1955	Jimmie Dodd & The Mickey Mouse Club Chorus And Orchestra	Released under the Official Mickey Mouse Club label.
Mickey Mouse Club March And Song	1955	Jimmie Dodd & The Merry Mouseketeers	Released under the Official Mickey Mouse Club label.
The Mickey Mouse Picture House Song / When I Grow Up	1955	The Mouseketeers	Released under the Official Mickey Mouse Club label.
Musical Highlights From The Mickey Mouse Club TV Show	1955	Various	Originally released under the Official Mickey Mouse Club label. Re-released in 1962 under Disneyland Records label and again in 2005
Official Mickey Mouse Club Pledge / Sho-Jo-Ji	1955	Various	Released under the Official Mickey Mouse Club label.
Pioneer Song / Apple Song	1955	Various	Released under the Official Mickey Mouse Club label.
Proverbs	1955	The Sandpiper Chorus And Orchestra, Mitch Miller & Orchestra	Released under the Official Mickey Mouse Club label.
The Pussy Cat Polka / The Micky Mouse Mambo	1955	Jimmie Dodd, The Mouseketeers & Ruth Carrell	Released under the Official Mickey Mouse Club label.
Songs from Walt Disney's Mickey Mouse Club	1955	Various	Released under the Official Mickey Mouse Club label.
The Triple R Song	1955	Tim Considine & The Triple R Chorus	Released under the Official Mickey Mouse Club label.
Walt Disney Presents the Story Of Johnny Appleseed	1955	Buddy Ebsen	Released under the Official Mickey Mouse Club label.
Walt Disney's Fun With Music From Many Lands	1955	Jimmie Dodd, Frances Archer, Beverly Gile, Roy Williams & The Mouseketeers	Released under the Official Mickey Mouse Club label.
Walt Disney's Mousekedances	1955	Jimmie Dodd, Ruth Carrell, The Mickey Mouse Club Chorus And Orchestra	Released under the Official Mickey Mouse Club label.
Walt Disney's Mouseketunes	1955	Jimmie Dodd & The Mouseketeers Chorus And Orchestra	Released under the Official Mickey Mouse Club label.
Date Nite At Disneyland	January 1, 1956	The Elliott Brothers Orchestra	Released under Disneyland Records label. Known as the Elliott Bros. Date Niters Orchestra on the record cover.
Westward Ho the Wagons! (Music from the Motion Picture)	January 1, 1956	George Bruns, Fess Parker & Salvador Camarata	Released under Disneyland Records label
The Ballad Of John Colter / Pioneer's Prayer	1956	Fess Parker	Released under Disneyland Records label
Davy Crockett and the River Pirates	1956	The Frontier Men Chorus & Orchestra	Released under the Official Mickey Mouse Club label.
From Walt Disney's Fantasia: Rite Of Spring / Toccata And Fugue	1956	Leopold Stokowski & The Philadelphia Orchestra	Released under Disneyland Records label
The Great Locomotive Chase	1956	The Sandpipers, Mitch Miller & Orchestra	Released under the Official Mickey Mouse Club label.
How Can I Miss You / Ja Da	1956	Cliff Edwards	Released under Disneyland Records label
I'm No Fool (Safety Song) / Frere Jacques (French Play Song)	1956	Cliff Edwards, Merry Mouseketeers, Frances Archer & Beverly Gile	Released under the Official Mickey Mouse Club label.
Kris Kringle / T'was The Night Before Christmas	1956	Cliff Edwards	Released under Disneyland Records label
The Littlest Outlaw	1956	Cliff Edwards & William Lava	Released under the Official Mickey Mouse Club label.
Mouskemusicals	1956	Darlene Gillespie	Released under the Official Mickey Mouse Club label.
Mouskethoughts	1956	Jimmie Dodd	Released under the Official Mickey Mouse Club label.
A Musical Tour Of Adventureland	1956	Walt Disney & The Disneyland Concert Orchestra	Released under Disneyland Records label
A Musical Tour Of Fantasyland	1956	Walt Disney & The Disneyland Concert Orchestra	Released under Disneyland Records label
A Musical Tour Of Frontierland	1956	Walt Disney & The Disneyland Concert Orchestra	Released under Disneyland Records label
A Musical Tour Of Main Street U.S.A.	1956	Walt Disney & The Disneyland Concert Orchestra	Released under Disneyland Records label
A Musical Tour Of Tomorrowland	1956	Walt Disney & The Disneyland Concert Orchestra	Released under Disneyland Records label
People And Places - Switzerland / Samoa (Original Music From The Soundtracks)	1956	Paul J. Smith & Oliver Wallace	Released under Disneyland Records label.
Play A Polka / The Drum Song	1956	The Sandpipers, Mitch Miller & Orchestra	Released under the Official Mickey Mouse Club label.
Roll Up The Rug For More Mouskedances	1956	Cliff Edwards	Released under the Official Mickey Mouse Club label.
Safety First	1956	Cliff Edwards	Released under the Official Mickey Mouse Club label.
Secrets Of Life (Original Music From The Soundtrack)	1956	Paul J. Smith	Released under Disneyland Records label.
Song Of The South	1956	Various	Released under Disneyland Records label.
Song Of The South	1956	Various	Released under Disneyland Records label.
Song Of The South / When You Wish Upon a Star	1956	Various	Released under Disneyland Records label.
Ukulele Ike Sings Again	1956	Cliff Edwards	Released under Disneyland Records label.
Walt Disney Presents A Child's Garden Of Verses And Other Stories For Children	1956	Frances Archer & Beverly Gile	Released under Disneyland Records label.
Walt Disney Takes You To Disneyland	1956	Disneyland Concert Orchestra	Released under Disneyland Records label. Re-released alongside the special edition of A Musical History of Disneyland in 2005
Walt Disney's Cinderella (Music From The Original Motion Picture Sound Track)	1956	Various	Released under Disneyland Records label. Re-released on CD on February 4, 1997. Re-released as a special edition CD on October 4, 2005.
Walt Disney's Uncle Remus (4 Songs From Song Of The South)	1956	Jimmie Dodd & Jeanne Gayle	Released under the Official Mickey Mouse Club label.
Walt Disney's Disneyland Band Concert	1956	Disneyland Band	Released under Disneyland Records label.
Westward Ho The Wagons!	1956	Jimmie Dodd & The Mouseketeers	Released under the Official Mickey Mouse Club label.
Westward Ho, The Wagons! The Ballad Of John Colter And Pioneer's Prayer	1956	The Sandpipers, Mitch Miller & Orchestra	Released under the Official Mickey Mouse Club label.
Westward Ho, The Wagons! Theme Song	1956	The Sandpipers, Mitch Miller & Orchestra	Released under the Official Mickey Mouse Club label.
Wringle Wrangle / The Ballad Of John Colter	1956	Fess Parker	Released under Disneyland Records label.
Wringle Wrangle / (I'm Lonely My Darlin') Green Grow The Lilacs	1956	The Sandpipers, Mitch Miller & Orchestra	Released under the Official Mickey Mouse Club label.
Wringle Wrangle / Westward Hoe-Down	1956	Salvador Camarata	Released under Disneyland Records label.
You Too Can Be The Life Of The Party	1956	Various	Released under Disneyland Records label.
Echoes of Disneyland	January 1, 1957	Dee Fisher	Released under Disneyland Records label.
Meet Me Down On Main Street	January 1, 1957	The Mellomen	Released under Disneyland Records label. Known as The Mellomen Barber Shop Quartet on the record cover.
Butterfly / Seven Days	1957	Darlene Gillespie	Released under Disneyland Records label.
Camarata Interprets The Music Of Walt Disney's Cinderella & Bambi	1957	Salvador Camarata	Released under Disneyland Records label.
Darlene Of The Teens	1957	Darlene Gillespie	Released under Disneyland Records label.
Darlene Of The Teens Part 1	1957	Darlene Gillespie	Released under Disneyland Records label.
Darlene Of The Teens Part 2	1957	Darlene Gillespie	Released under Disneyland Records label.
Darlene Of The Teens Part 3	1957	Darlene Gillespie	Released under Disneyland Records label.
A Day At Disneyland With Walt Disney And Jiminy Cricket	1957	Walt Disney & Cliff Edwards	Released under Disneyland Records label.
Deep In The Heart Of Dixieland	1957	George Bruns & The Wonderland Jazz Band	Released under Disneyland Records label.
A Hole In The Sky / Wedding Bell Calypso (Man Talk Too Much)	1957	Fess Parker	Released under Disneyland Records label.
Mousekartoon Time	1957	Various	Released under the Official Mickey Mouse Club label.
A Mousekathought / Smile And Face The Music	1957	The Sandpiper Chorus, Mitch Miller & Orchestra	Released under the Official Mickey Mouse Club label.
Music From Walt Disney's True-Life Adventures	1957	Paul J. Smith	Released under Disneyland Records label.
Old Yeller	1957	Fess Parker, Dorothy McGuire & Oliver Wallace	Released under Disneyland Records label. Not to be confused with 1958 album of the same name.
Parisian Life Highlights of Offenbach Operettas	1957	Jany Sylvaire & Aimé Doniat & Jules Gressier	Released under Disneyland Records label.
Perri	1957	Jimmie Dodd & Darlene Gillespie	Released under Disneyland Records label.
Railroadin' Man / Sons Of Old Aunt Dinah	1957	Salvador Camarata	Released under Disneyland Records label.
Rock-A-Billy / I've Never Been In Love	1957	Darlene Gillespie	Released under Disneyland Records label.
The Saga Of Andy Burnett	1957	Jerome Courtland	Released under Disneyland Records label.
Sittin' In The Balcony / Too Much	1957	Darlene Gillespie	Released under Disneyland Records label.
Slue-Foot Sue's Golden Horseshoe Review	1957	Various	Released under Disneyland Records label. Re-released in 2010
Summer	1957	Salvador Camarata	Released under Disneyland Records label.
Tutti's Trumpets	1957	Tutti's Trumpets	Released under Disneyland Records label.
Walt Disney Presents 27 New Songs From the Mickey Mouse Club TV Show	1957	Jimmie Dodd, Mouseketeers & Cliff Edwards	Released under the Official Mickey Mouse Club label.
Walt Disney's Annette	1957	Jimmie Dodd & Chorus	Released under the Official Mickey Mouse Club label.
Walt Disney's Story Of Bambi	1957	Jimmie Dodd	Released under Disneyland Records label. Not to be confused with the 1966 album of the same name.
The Story Of Walt Disney's Cinderella	1957	Cliff Edwards, Ilene Woods & Don Barclay	Released under Disneyland Records label
Walt Disney's Story Of Dumbo	1957	Edward Brophy	Released under Disneyland Records label
Walt Disney's Story Of Pinocchio	1957	Ned Washington, Leigh Harline, Paul J. Smith & Cliff Edwards	Released under Disneyland Records label
Walt Disney's Story Of Snow White And The Seven Dwarfs	1957	Various	Released under Disneyland Records label. Not to be confused with the 1966 album of the same name
Winter	1957	Salvador Camarata	Released under Disneyland Records label.
You Too Can Be The Life Of The Party - Vol. 2	1957	Various	Released under Disneyland Records label
Tall Paul / Ma - He's Making Eyes At Me	November 1, 1958	Annette Funicello & The Afterbeats	Released under Disneyland Records label
All The King's Saxes	1958	Hymie Shertzer & All Star Sax Group	Released under Disneyland Records label
Autumn	1958	Salvador Camarata	Released under Disneyland Records label
Biarn’s Song (The Piney Woods)/In Missouri	1958	Stan Jones & The Deputies	Released under Disneyland Records label
Christmas Surprises	1958	Various	Released under the Official Mickey Mouse Club label.
Christmas Trees Of Disneyland	1958	Camarata Chorus And Orchestra	Released under the Official Mickey Mouse Club label.
Community Concert	1958	Frances Archer & Beverly Gile	Released under Disneyland Records label
Creakin' Leather	1958	Stan Jones	Released under Disneyland Records label
Dancing In Peacock Alley	1958	Bernie Leighton	Released under Disneyland Records label
Disneyland Stereophonic Highlights	1958	Various	Released under Disneyland Records label
Don't Jump To Conclusions / How Will I Know My Love	1958	Annette Funicello	Released under Disneyland Records label
Fall Holidays With The Mouseketeers	1958	Various	Released under the Official Mickey Mouse Club label.
Four Adventures Of Zorro	1958	Guy Williams	Released under Disneyland Records label.
Four Songs From Walt Disney's Sleeping Beauty	1958	Various	Released under the Official Mickey Mouse Club label.
Four Songs From Walt Disney's Snow White	1958	Various	Released under the Official Mickey Mouse Club label.
From Walt Disney's Fantasia: Night On Bald Mountain / The Pastoral Symphony	1958	Leopold Stokowski & The Philadelphia Orchestra	Released under Disneyland Records label.
From Walt Disney's Fantasia: The Nutcracker Suite	1958	Leopold Stokowski & The Philadelphia Orchestra	Released under Disneyland Records label.
Happy Birthday To You (From The Mouseketeers)	1958	Jimmie Dodd, Darlene Gillespie & Mouseketeer Chorus	Released under the Official Mickey Mouse Club label.
Happy Birthday From The Mouseketeers	1958	The Mouseketeers, Darlene Gillespie, Jimmie Dodd & Mouseketeer Chorus	Released under the Official Mickey Mouse Club label.
The Happy Wanderer In Europe	1958	Salvatore Camarata	Released under Disneyland Records label.
Hi-Ho	1958	Mary Martin, Salvador Camarata, His Trumpets & Orchestra	Released under Disneyland Records label.
Hi-Ho / The Magic Song	1958	Mary Martin & Tutti's Trumpets	Released under Disneyland Records label.
Holidays With The Mouseketeers	1958	Various	Released under the Official Mickey Mouse Club label.
Holidays with the Mouseketeers, 4 Holiday Songs	1958	Mouseketeer Chorus	Released under the Official Mickey Mouse Club label.
How Will I Know My Love / Annette	1958	Annette Funicello & Jimmie Dodd	Released under Disneyland Records label
I Wonder / Once Upon A Dream	1958	Darlene Gillespie	Released under the Official Mickey Mouse Club label.
Jimmie Dodd Sings His Favorite Hymns	1958	Jimmie Dodd	Released under Disneyland Records label.
Karen And Cubby – Sing Songs Together	1958	Karen Pendleton & Cubby O'Brien	Released under the Official Mickey Mouse Club label.
Little Gems From Big Shows	1958	Various	Released under Disneyland Records label.
Meeting at the Malt Shop / Theme Song From Zorro	1958	Various	Released under Disneyland Records label.
Mickey's Big Show	1958	Various	Released under the Official Mickey Mouse Club label.
My Rebel Heart/ Light in the forest	1958	Jerome Courtland	Released under Disneyland Records label.
A Musical Love Story	1958	Mary Martin	Released under Disneyland Records label.
Old Yeller	1958	Jerome Courtland & Kevin Corcoran	Released under the Official Mickey Mouse Club label. Not to be confused with the 1957 Album of the same name.
Peter And The Wolf	1958	Sergei Prokofiev, Sterling Holloway	Released under Disneyland Records label.
Peter And The Wolf / The Sorcerer's Apprentice	1958	Leopold Stokowski & Sterling Holloway	Released under Disneyland Records label.
Saludos Amigos: Music From South Of The Border	1958	Various	Originally released as an LP in 1958. Released on digital on January 16, 2007
Sheriff Of Cochise / Cheyenne	1958	Stan Jones & The Deputies	Released under Disneyland Records label.
Songs About Zorro	1958	various	Released under the Official Mickey Mouse Club label.
Songs From Annette And Other Walt Disney Serials	1958	Annette Funicello, Tim Considine, Darlene, Jimmie Dodd & Buddy Ebsen	Released under the Official Mickey Mouse Club label.
Songs From Walt Disney's Peter Pan	1958	Jimmie Dodd & Henry Calvin	Released under the Official Mickey Mouse Club label.
Songs From Walt Disney's TV Serials	1958	Various	Released under the Official Mickey Mouse Club label.
The Shaggy Dog	1958	Paul Frees, Fred MacMurray, Roberta Shore, Salvador Camarata & William Dunham	Released under Disneyland Records label. 4 song album
Spring	1958	Salvador Camarata	Released under Disneyland Records label.
Spring And Summer Holidays	1958	Jimmie Dodd	Released under Disneyland Records label.
This Was The West	1958	Stan Jones & The Ranger Chorus	Released under Disneyland Records label.
Walt Disney's Paul Bunyan	1958	Thurl Ravenscroft	Released under the Official Mickey Mouse Club label.
Walt Disney Presents Songs Of The National Parks	1958	Stan Jones & The Ranger Chorus	Released under Disneyland Records label.
A Walt Disney Song Fest	1958	Various	Released under the Official Mickey Mouse Club label.
The Sorcerer's Apprentice	1958	Paul Dukas, Leopold Stokowski & Sterling Holloway	Released under Disneyland Records label.
Walt Disney's Perri	1958	Jimmie Dodd & Darlene Gillespie	Released under the Official Mickey Mouse Club label.
Walt Disney's Story Of Alice In Wonderland	1958	Various	Released under Disneyland Records label. Not to be confused with the 1965 album of the same name.
Walt Disney's Story Of Sleeping Beauty	1958	Mary Martin	Released under Disneyland Records label.
Walt Disney's Three Adventures Of Davy Crockett	1958	Fess Parker & Buddy Ebsen	Released under Disneyland Records label.
Waltzes of Vienna	1958	Johann Strauss Jr.	Released under Disneyland Records label.
We're The Mouseketeers	1958	Jimmie Dodd & The Mouseketeers Chorus And Orchestra	Released under the Official Mickey Mouse Club label.
Words To Grow By	1958	Jimmie Dodd & The Mouseketeers	Released under the Official Mickey Mouse Club label.
Yarns And Songs	1958	Fess Parker	Released under Disneyland Records label.
Zorro	1958	Henry Calvin	Released under Disneyland Records label.
Zorro Frees The Indians	1958	Guy Williams	Released under Disneyland Records label.
Zorro And The Ghost	1958	Guy Williams	Released under Disneyland Records label.
Story Of The Country Cousin (After Aesop - Way After)	September 3, 1959	Sterling Holloway & Salvador Camarata	Released under Disneyland Records label.
Annette	1959	Annette Funicello	Released under Buena Vista Records label.
Darby O'Gill and the Little People	1959	Various	Released under Disneyland Records label.
Dixieland At Disneyland	1959	The Strawhatters	Released under Disneyland Records label.
Donald Duck And His Chipmunk Friends	1959	Various	Released under Disneyland Records label.
First Name Initial / My Heart Became Of Age	1959	Annette Funicello & The Afterbeats	Released under Disneyland Records label.
From Walt Disney's Adventures Of Zorro	1959	The Sandpipers, Mitch Miller & Orchestra	Released under Golden Records label.
Goofy's Dance Party (6 Easy Dances and How to Do Them)	1959	Various	Released under Disneyland Records label.
Goofy's Dance Party (16 Easy Dances and How to Do Them)	1959	Various	Released under Disneyland Records label.
Happy Birthday To You	1959	Various	Released under Disneyland Records label.
Jo-Jo The Dog-Faced Boy / Love Me Forever	1959	Annette Funicello	Released under Buena Vista Records label.
Love Theme From Walt Disney's Sleeping Beauty / Sleeping Beauty Medley	1959	Salvador Camarata	Released under Disneyland Records label.
Melodies For Midnight	1959	Johnny LaPadula	Released under Disneyland Records label.
Music Of The Seasons	1959	Salvador Camarata	Released under Disneyland Records label. Released as a 4 LP Box Set
Shaggy Dog	1959	Roberta Shore	Released under Disneyland Records label.
Shaggy Dog Songs	1959	Paul J. Smith	Released under Disneyland Records label.
Sleeping Beauty	1959	George Bruns	Originally released as an LP in 1959. Re-released on CD on January 21, 1997.
Songs From Walt Disney's Sleeping Beauty	1959	Various	Released under the Official Mickey Mouse Club label.
Songs From Walt Disney's Toby Tyler And Other Circus Songs	1959	Various	Released under Disneyland Records label.
Stories In Song Of The West	1959	Fess Parker	Released under Disneyland Records label.
Swamp Fox / Bronco Boogie	1959	Rex Allen	Released under Disneyland Records label.
The Shaggy Dog	1959	Various	Released under Disneyland Records label. Full album version.
Walt Disney Presents America The Beautiful	1959	Disneyland Chorus & Orchestra	Released under Disneyland Records label.
Walt Disney Presents Folk Songs For Small Folks	1959	Frances Archer & Beverly Gile	Released under Disneyland Records label.
Walt Disney Presents Swamp Fox	1959	Various	Released under Disneyland Records label.
Walt Disney's Christmas Concert	1959	Jimmy MacDonald & Cliff Edwards	Released under Disneyland Records label.
Walt Disney's A Cowboy Needs A Song	1959	Fess Parker	Released under Disneyland Records label.
Walt Disney's Game Songs	1959	Jimmie Dodd & The Mouseketeers	Released under Disneyland Records label.
Walt Disney's Music Cavalcade	1959	Various	Released under Disneyland Records label.
Walt Disney's Sing A Song With Mickey	1959	Various	Released under Disneyland Records label.
Walt Disney's Sleeping Beauty / Special Promotional Record / Excerpts From Track And Popular Versions	1959	Various	Released under Disneyland Records label.

=== 1960s ===
Title	U.S. release date	Artist	Notes
Annette Sings Anka	1960	Annette Funicello	Released under Buena Vista Records label.
Donald Duck and His Friends	1960	Various	Released under Disneyland Records label.
Hawaiiannette	1960	Annette Funicello	Released under Buena Vista Records label.
I've Been Working On The Railroad	1960	Various	Released under Disneyland Records label.
The Little Lame Lamb, A Christmas Story Of St. Francis	1960	Mary Martin & Salvador Camarata	Released under Disneyland Records label.
Pineapple Princess / Luau Cha Cha Cha	1960	Annette Funicello & The Afterbeats	Released under Buena Vista Records label.
Pollyanna Songs	1960	Hayley Mills	Released under Disneyland Records label.
Stop, Look and Listen / Safety First	1960	Cliff Edwards	Released under Disneyland Records label.
Train Of Love / Tell Me Who's The Girl	1960	Annette Funicello	Released under Buena Vista Records label.
Walt Disney Presents the Story of Pollyanna	1960	Kevin Corcoran, Hayley Mills	Released under Disneyland Records label.
Walt Disney's Story Of Toby Tyler In The Circus	1960	Various	Released under Disneyland Records label.
Babes in Toyland (Original Soundtrack)	1961	Various	Released under Disneyland Records label.
The Best Stories Of Aesop	1961	Sterling Holloway	Released under Disneyland Records label.
Carnival Time featuring Professor Ludwig Von Drake	1961	Paul Frees	Released under Disneyland Records label.
Chipmunk Fun With	1961	Various	Released under Disneyland Records label.
Clementine And Other Favorite Songs	1961	Various	Released under Disneyland Records label.
Dance Annette	1961	Annette Funicello	Released under Disneyland Records label.
Donald Duck In Six Big Stories	1961	Various	Released under Disneyland Records label.
Donald's Fire Station / Donald's Temper	1961	Various	Released under Disneyland Records label.
Folk Songs For Little Folks	1961	Frances Archer & Beverly Gile	Released under Disneyland Records label.
Four Songs From Babes In Toyland	1961	Various	Released under Disneyland Records label.
Four Songs From Lady And The Tramp	1961	Various	Released under Disneyland Records label.
From Robert Louis Stevenson's A Child's Garden Of Verses	1961	Frances Archer & Beverly Gile	Released under Disneyland Records label.
From Walt Disney's Fantasia: The Pastoral Symphony	1961	Leopold Stokowski & The Philadelphia Orchestra	Released under Disneyland Records label.
Give a Little Whistle Plus A Story From Pinocchio	1961	Cliff Edwards	Released under Disneyland Records label.
Greyfriars Bobby	1961	Ginny Tyler	Released under Disneyland Records label.
Heigh-Ho	1961	Various	Released under Disneyland Records label.
I'm Ludwig Von Drake	1961	Paul Frees	Released under Disneyland Records label.
I've Got No Strings Plus A Story From Pinocchio	1961	Dick Jones & Cliff Edwards	Released under Disneyland Records label.
Indian Giver	1961	Annette Funicello & The Up Beats	Released under Buena Vista Records label.
Hi-Diddle-Dee-Dee Plus A Story From Pinocchio	1961	Cliff Edwards & Walter Catlett	Released under Disneyland Records label.
Jingle Bells / From All Of Us To All Of You	1961	Various	Released under Buena Vista Records label.
Just A Whisper Away / I Can't Do The Sum	1961	Various	Released under Disneyland Records label.
Let's Get Together	1961	Hayley Mills	Released under Disneyland Records label.
Mary Had a Little Lamb and Other Mother Goose Rhymes	1961	Sterling Holloway	Released under Disneyland Records label.
Mickey's Band Concert	1961	Various	Released under Disneyland Records label.
Nikki, Wild Dog Of The North	1961	Various	Released under Disneyland Records label.
One Hundred and One Dalmatians (Original Soundtrack)	1961	George Bruns & Mel Leven	Released under Disneyland Records label.
Pop Goes the Weasel	1961	Various	Released under Disneyland Records label.
Sing For You	1961	Various	Released under Disneyland Records label.
Riddles And Rhymes (From Mother Goose)	1961	Sterling Holloway	Released under Disneyland Records label.
Silent Night And Other Christmas Carols	1961	The All Mouse Choir	Released under Disneyland Records label.
Six Mother Goose Songs	1961	Sterling Holloway	Released under Disneyland Records label.
A Song For Your Birthday (Happy Birthday) / A Song For All Your Unbirthdays (Unbirthday Song)	1961	Various	Released under Disneyland Records label.
Songs Of Our Heritage For Young Americans	1961	Disneyland Concert Band & Glee Club	Released under Disneyland Records label.
Songs from Walt Disney's 101 Dalmatians	1961	Various	Released under Disneyland Records label.
Songs From Walt Disney's Babes In Toyland	1961	Various	Released under Disneyland Records label.
Songs From Robert Louis Stevenson's A Child's Garden Of Verses	1961	Frances Archer & Beverly Gile	Released under Disneyland Records label.
The Stories And Songs Of Walt Disney's Three Little Pigs	1961	Sterling Holloway & Salvador Camarata	Released under Disneyland Records label.
The Story Of Hans Brinker (And The Silver Skates)	1961	Various	Released under Disneyland Records label.
The Story Of The Night Before Christmas	1961	Various	Released under Disneyland Records label.
Walt Disney Presents Daniel Boone	1961	Various	Released under Disneyland Records label.
Walt Disney Presents The Great Composers (A Young Peoples's Introduction To Their Music And Stories)	1961	Various	Released under Disneyland Records label.
Walt Disney Presents: Music: How It's Made And Played	1961	Various	Released under Disneyland Records label.
Walt Disney Presents Professor Ludwig Von Drake	1961	Paul Frees	Released under Disneyland Records label.
Walt Disney's 101 Dalmatians (Songs From The Film)	1961	Various	Released under Disneyland Records label.
Walt Disney's Dog Songs	1961	Various	Released under Disneyland Records label.
Walt Disney's Fun With Music	1961	Various	Released under Disneyland Records label.
Walt Disney's Lullabies	1961	Various	Released under Disneyland Records label.
Walt Disney's Mother Goose Rhymes	1961	Disneyland Children's Chorus	Released under Disneyland Records label.
Walt Disney's Story Of The Absent Minded Professor	1961	Sterling Holloway & Fred MacMurray	Released under Disneyland Records label.
Walt Disney's The Three Little Pigs	1961	Various	Released under the Official Mickey Mouse Club label.
Walt Disney's The Tortoise And The Hare	1961	Sterling Holloway	Released under Disneyland Records label.
When You Wish Upon a Star Plus A Story From Pinocchio	1961	Cliff Edwards	Released under Disneyland Records label.
The Workshop Song / Just A Toy	1961	Ed Wynn	Released under Disneyland Records label.
Acting Out The ABC's	1962	Various	Released under Disneyland Records label.
Baa Baa Black Sheep and other NURSERY RHYMES	1962	Various	Released under Disneyland Records label.
Bambi And Thumper	1962	Various	Released under Disneyland Records label.
Bon Voyage / I Get A Kick Outa Kissin'	1962	Peggy King	Released under Buena Vista Records label.
Christmas at Disneyland: Two Songs from the Magic Kingdom	1962	Camarata Orchestra & Chorus	Released under Disneyland Records label.
The Farmer's In The Dell	1962	Various	Released under Disneyland Records label.
4 Songs From Walt Disney's Pinocchio	1962	Various	Released under Disneyland Records label.
Grad Nite At Disneyland	1962	The Elliott Brothers Orchestra	Released under Buena Vista Records label.
Great Operatic Composers (Their Stories And Their Music)	1962	Salvador Camarata	Released under Disneyland Records label.
How To Be A Mouseketeer	1962	Jimmie Dodd & The Mouseketeers	Released under Disneyland Records label.
Humpty Dumpty And Other Mother Goose Rhymes	1962	Various	Released under Disneyland Records label.
Jeepers Creepers / Johnny Jingo	1962	Hayley Mills	Released under Buena Vista Records label.
Let's Get Together With Hayley Mills	1962	Hayley Mills	Released under Buena Vista Records label.
Musical Highlights from the Mickey Mouse Club TV Show	1962	Various	Released under Disneyland Records label. Re-Released in 2005
More Mother Goose	1962	Various	Released under Disneyland Records label.
Old King Cole And Other Nursery Rhymes	1962	Sterling Holloway	Released under Disneyland Records label.
One, Two, Three's	1962	Various	Released under Disneyland Records label.
The Parent Trap!	1962	Tommy Sands & Annette Funicello	Released under Buena Vista Records label.
Peter Cottontail Plus Other Funny Bunnies And Their Friends	1962	Various	Released under Disneyland Records label.
The Prince And The Pauper	1962	Various	Released under Disneyland Records label.
Sailor Songs	1962	Various	Released under Disneyland Records label.
Seven Moons (of Beta Lyrae) / That Crazy Place In Outer Space	1962	Dany Saval And Tom Tryon & Annette Funicello With Jet's Quartet	Released under Buena Vista Records label.
Siamese Cat Song	1962	Peggy Lee & The Melomen	Released under Disneyland Records label.
Sing Along With Jimmie Dodd	1962	Jimmie Dodd	Released under Disneyland Records label.
Some Day My Prince Will Come	1962	Adriana Caselotti & Annette Funicello	Released under Disneyland Records label.
Songs From All Around The World	1962	Various	Released under Disneyland Records label.
The Story of Big Red	1962	Various	Released under Disneyland Records label.
The Story Of Jack And Jill	1962	Rica Moore	Released under Disneyland Records label.
The Story Of London Bridge	1962	Rica Moore	Released under Disneyland Records label.
Ten Little Indians	1962	Various	Released under Disneyland Records label.
Three Little Kittens	1962	Various	Released under Disneyland Records label.
Walt Disney Presents Best Loved Fairy Tales: The Stories Children Love To Hear Over And Over Again	1962	Rica Moore, Larry Bunker Red Mitchell	Released under Disneyland Records label.
Walt Disney Presents In Search Of The Castaways	1962	Maurice Chevalier, Hayley Mills, George Sanders, Wilfrid Hyde-White, John Mills	Released under Disneyland Records label.
Walt Disney Presents Songs For Bedtime	1962	Various	Released under Disneyland Records label.
Walt Disney's Adventures Of Little Hiawatha	1962	Grey Johnson & Ginny Tyler	Released under Disneyland Records label.
Walt Disney's The Legend Of Sleepy Hollow	1962	Bing Crosby & Jud Conlon's Rhythmaires	Released under Disneyland Records label.
Walt Disney's The Legend Of Sleepy Hollow And Rip Van Winkle	1962	Billy Bletcher	Released under Disneyland Records label.
Who's Afraid of the Big Bad Wolf?	1962	Frank Churchill	Released under Disneyland Records label.
A Most Befuddling Thing	July 1, 1963	Various	Released under Disneyland Records label.
30 Favorite Songs Of Christmas With Chimes And Chorus	1963	Various	Released under Disneyland Records label.
Annette's Beach Party	1963	Annette Funicello	Released under Buena Vista Records label.
The Ballad of Davy Crockett / A Whale Of A Tale	1963	The Wellingtons	Released under Disneyland Records label.
Bibbidi Bobbidi Boo / Oh Sing Sweet Nightingale	1963	Verna Felton & Ilene Woods	Released under Disneyland Records label.
Donald Duck And Uncle Scrooge's Money Rocket	1963	Various	Released under Disneyland Records label.
Flubber Song	1963	Fred MacMurray	Released under Disneyland Records label.
Higitus Figitus / The Legend Of The Sword In The Stone	1963	Various	Released under Disneyland Records label.
Mad Madam Mim / That's What Makes The World Go 'Round	1963	Various	Released under Disneyland Records label.
Most Beloved Songs	1963	Various	Released under Disneyland Records label.
On The Front Porch / Ugly Bug Ball	1963	Burl Ives	Released under Buena Vista Records label.
Rootin' Tootin' Hootenanny (Folk Songs For Small Folks)	1963	Beverly Gile, Fess Parker & Frances Archer	Released under Disneyland Records label.
Summer Magic Player Piano Sing Along	1963	Various	Released under Disneyland Records label.
The Story Of 20,000 Leagues Under The Sea	1963	Al Hoffman & Norman Gimbel	Released under Disneyland Records label.
Tales Of Mother Goose Volume Three	1963	Various	Released under Disneyland Records label.
Treat Him Nicely / Promise Me Anything	1963	Annette Funicello	Released under Buena Vista Records label.
Twinkle Twinkle Little Star / All Through The Night	1963	Various	Released under Disneyland Records label.
Ugly Bug Ball / Femininity	1963	Various	Released under Disneyland Records label.
Walt Disney Presents All About Dragons	1963	Thurl Ravenscroft	Released under Disneyland Records label.
Walt Disney Presents all the songs from The Sword in the Stone	1963	Various	Released under Disneyland Records label.
Walt Disney Presents Burl Ives' Animal Folk	1963	Burl Ives	Released under Disneyland Records label.
Walt Disney Presents Folk Heroes	1963	The Wellingtons	Released under Disneyland Records label.
Walt Disney Presents Four Songs From The Sword In The Stone	1963	Various	Released under Disneyland Records label.
Walt Disney Presents The Musical Story Of Tubby The Tuba	1963	Annette Funicello, John Thomas Johnson & Jimmie Dodd	Released under Disneyland Records label.
Walt Disney Presents The Story Of Goldilocks And The Three Bears	1963	Rica Moore	Released under Disneyland Records label.
Walt Disney Presents The Story Of Hector, The Stowaway Pup	1963	Various	Released under Disneyland Records label.
Walt Disney Presents The Story Of Savage Sam	1963	Thurl Ravenscroft	Released under Disneyland Records label.
Walt Disney Presents The Story Of An Incredible Journey	1963	Rex Allen	Released under Disneyland Records label.
Walt Disney Presents The Story Of Mickey & The Beanstalk	1963	Various	Released under Disneyland Records label.
Walt Disney Presents The Story Of The Sword In The Stone	1963	Various	Released under Disneyland Records label.
Walt Disney presents The Stories of the Great Composers	1963	Various	Released under Disneyland Records label.
Walt Disney Presents Summer Magic	1963	Various	Released under Disneyland Records label.
Walt Disney's 101 Dalmatians in Song and Story	1963	Various	Released under Disneyland Records label.
Walt Disney's Addition And Subtraction	1963	Cliff Edwards & Rica Moore	Released under Disneyland Records label.
Walt Disney's The Littlest Outlaw	1963	Various	Released under the Official Mickey Mouse Club label.
Walt Disney's Multiplication And Division	1963	Cliff Edwards & Rica Moore	Released under Disneyland Records label.
Walt Disney's Savage Sam And Old Yeller	1963	Various	Released under Disneyland Records label.
Walt Disney's Story Of The Grasshopper And The Ants	1963	Sterling Holloway	Released under Disneyland Records label.
Walt Disney's Story Of Swiss Family Robinson	1963	Kevin Corcoran	Released under Disneyland Records label.
Walt Disney's Treasury Of Mother Goose Nursery Rhymes	1963	Sterling Holloway & Salvador Camarata	Released under Disneyland Records label.
Walt Disney's Wonderful World Of Color	1963	Various	Released under Disneyland Records label.
Walt Disney's Zoo Songs	1963	Rica Moore	Released under Disneyland Records label.
Western Songs For Children	1963	Various	Released under Disneyland Records label.
10 Songs From Mary Poppins	1964	Various	Released under Disneyland Records label.
The Animal Stories Of Aesop	1964	Sterling Holloway & Salvador Camarata	Released under Disneyland Records label.
Chilling, Thrilling Sounds of the Haunted House	1964	Various	Released under Disneyland Records label.
Chim Chim Cheree (From Walt Disney's Mary Poppins)	1964	Burl Ives	Released under Disneyland Records label.
Chim Chim Cheree / Let's Go Fly a Kite	1964	Bill Lee	Released under Disneyland Records label.
Chim Chim Cheree And Other Children's Choices	1964	Burl Ives	Released under Buena Vista Records label.
Famous Arias From Aida	1964	Various	Released under Disneyland Records label.
Great Moments with Mr. Lincoln	1964	Royal Dano	Released under Disneyland Records label.
Happy Birthday And Songs For Every Holiday	1964	Various	Released under Disneyland Records label.
It's a Small World	1964	Children's Choir	Released under Disneyland Records label. It's a Small World sang in 4 Languages. Not to be confused with the 1965 Version
It's a Small World	1964	Winston Hibler	Released under Disneyland Records label. It's a Small World with narration. Not to be confused with the 1965 Version
Jolly Holiday	1964	Richard M. Sherman	Released under Disneyland Records label.
Just So Stories	1964	Sterling Holloway & Salvador Camarata	Released under Disneyland Records label.
Learning To Tell Time Is Fun	1964	Laura Olsher & Salvador Camarata	Released under Buena Vista Records label.
The Little Engine That Could! And The Submarine Streetcar	1964	Jimmy Johnson	Released under Disneyland Records label.
The Living Desert And The Vanishing Prairie	1964	Paul J. Smith	Released under Buena Vista Records label.
Mary Poppins: Original Cast Soundtrack	1964	Various	Released under Buena Vista Records label.
Mother Goose Nursery Rhymes - A Treasury Of Best Loved Songs And Poems	1964	Sterling Holloway & Salvador Camarata	Released under Disneyland Records label.
Pecos Bill And Other Stories In Song	1964	Fess Parker	Released under Disneyland Records label.
Relating Stories Of Galileo	1964	Julius Sumner Miller	Released under Disneyland Records label.
Relating Stories Of Sir Isaac Newton	1964	Julius Sumner Miller	Released under Disneyland Records label.
Relating Stories Of Benjamin Franklin: The Man And His Discoveries	1964	Julius Sumner Miller	Released under Disneyland Records label.
The Scarecrow Of Romney Marsh	1964	The Wellingtons	Released under Disneyland Records label.
Singing 10 Of Their Greatest All Time Hits	1964	Annette Funicello & Hayley Mills	Released under Disneyland Records label.
Songs From Walt Disney's Mary Poppins	1964	Various	Released under Disneyland Records label.
A Spoonful of Sugar	1964	Marni Nixon	Released under Disneyland Records label.
The Story And Songs From Walt Disney's Mary Poppins	1964	Various	Released under Disneyland Records label.
The Stories Of The Great Composers Vol II	1964	Various	Released under Disneyland Records label.
Super-Cali-Fragil-Istic-Expi-Ali-Docious	1964	Various	Released under Disneyland Records label.
Treasury Of Dog Stories	1964	Various	Released under Disneyland Records label.
Walt Disney At New York World's Fair - It's a Small World	1964	Winston Hibler	Released under Disneyland Records label.
Walt Disney Presents Best Of Broadway	1964	Various	Released under Disneyland Records label.
Walt Disney Presents Famous Arias From Carmen	1964	Various	Released under Disneyland Records label.
Walt Disney Presents Folk Lullabies	1964	Burl Ives	Released under Disneyland Records label.
Walt Disney Presents The Story Of Hansel And Gretel	1964	Various	Released under Disneyland Records label.
Walt Disney's Further Adventures Of Cinderella's Mice	1964	Salvador Camarata, Sterling Holloway, Robie Lester, Jimmy MacDonald	Released under Disneyland Records label.
Walt Disney's Original Chip 'n' Dale Chipmunk Fun Railroadin' Songs	1964	Various	Released under Buena Vista Records label.
Walt Disney Pictures Presents All the Songs from Winnie the Pooh and the Honey Tree	1964	Various	Released under Disneyland Records label.
Walt Disney Presents Children's Riddles And Game Songs	1964	Various	Released under Disneyland Records label.
Walt Disney Presents Dennis Day In The Story Of Johnny Appleseed	1964	Dennis Day	Released under Disneyland Records label.
Walt Disney Presents Goofy's TV Spectacular	1964	Various	Released under Disneyland Records label.
Walt Disney Presents Let's Have A Parade (Favorite Marches For Children)	1964	Various	Released under Disneyland Records label.
Walt Disney Presents The Legend Of Lobo / Walt Disney's Old Yeller	1964	Rex Allen & Fess Parker	Released under Disneyland Records label.
Walt Disney Presents The Little Engine That Could	1964	Laura Olsher & Bill Kannady	Released under Disneyland Records label.
Walt Disney Presents The Story Of Robin Hood	1964	Dal McKennon	Released under Disneyland Records label.
Walt Disney Presents The Story Of Emil And The Detectives	1964	Walter Slezak, Bryan Russell, Roger Mobley, Cindy Cassell	Released under Disneyland Records label.
Walt Disney Presents The Story Of So Dear To My Heart	1964	Various	Released under Disneyland Records label.
Walt Disney Presents The Story of Treasure Island	1964	Dal McKennon	Released under Buena Vista Records label.
Walt Disney's Story Of The 101 Dalmatians	November 1, 1965	Various	Released under Disneyland Records label.
Chim Chim Cheree / Step in Time	1965	Dick Van Dyke	Released under Buena Vista Records label.
A Country Coyote Goes Hollywood	1965	Bill Lee	Released under Disneyland Records label.
Great Ballets And Their Stories	1965	Orchestra Of The Royal Opera House, Covent Garden	Released under Disneyland Records label.
Great Piano Concertos and their Composers	1965	Symphonie-Orchester Graunke	Released under Disneyland Records label.
It's a Small World	1965	Disneyland Boys Choir	Released under Disneyland Records label. Not to be confused with the 1964 Version's.
Just So Stories Volume 2	1965	Sterling Holloway & Salvador Camarata	Released under Disneyland Records label.
March Along With Mary Poppins	1965	U.C.L.A. Band & Kelly James	Released under Disneyland Records label.
National Anthems And Their Stories	1965	Salvador Camarata	Released under Disneyland Records label.
The Music From Walt Disney's "Winnie The Pooh"	1965	Various	Released under Disneyland Records label.
The Scarecrow of Oz	1965	Annette Funicello	Released under Disneyland Records label.
Walt Disney's Story Of Goliath II	1965	Sterling Holloway	Released under Disneyland Records label.
Walt Disney's Story Of Peter Pan & Wendy	1965	Various	Released under Disneyland Records label.
These United States Facts, Music and Folklore	1965	Dick Whittinghill	Released under Disneyland Records label.
Walt Disney's Story Of The Three Little Pigs	1965	Various	Released under Disneyland Records label.
Walt Disney Presents Winnie the Pooh and The Honey Tree	1965	Sebastian Cabot & Sterling Holloway	Released under Disneyland Records label.
Walt Disney Presents The Stories Of Hans Christian Andersen	1965	Salvador Camarata	Released under Disneyland Records label.
Walt Disney's Story Of Alice In Wonderland	1965	Various	Released under Disneyland Records label.
Walt Disney's Story Of Mary Poppins	1965	Various	Released under Disneyland Records label.
Walt Disney's Story Of The Ugly Dachshund Plus Songs Of The Shaggy Dog	1965	Various	Released under Disneyland Records label.
Carousel	1966	Jan Clayton	Released under Buena Vista Records label.
Casey, JR. / Timothy Mouse Tells About Circus Life	1966	Various	Released under Disneyland Records label.
Follow Me, Boys! And Other Songs For The Campfire	1966	Various	Released under Disneyland Records label.
Four Songs From Walt Disney's Cinderella	1966	Jimmie Dodd & Darlene Gillespie	Released under the Official Mickey Mouse Club label.
A Happy Birthday Party With Winnie The Pooh	1966	Sterling Holloway	Released under Disneyland Records label.
Mary Martin Tells The Story And Sings The Songs Of Rodgers And Hammerstein's The Sound Of Music	1966	Mary Martin	Released under Disneyland Records label.
Mind Over Matter From Walt Disney's Winnie The Pooh	1966	Various	Released under Disneyland Records label.
Relating Stories Of Michael Faraday (Father Of The Age Of Electricity)	1966	Julius Sumner Miller	Released under Disneyland Records label.
A Musical Tour Of France With Maurice Chevalier	1966	Maurice Chevalier	Released under Disneyland Records label.
A Nature Guide (About Birds, Bees, Beavers, And Bears)	1966	Various	Released under Disneyland Records label.
Old Mother Hubbard	1966	Sterling Holloway & Salvador Camarata	Released under Disneyland Records label.
Puff, The Magic Dragon	1966	Sally Sweetland, Bill Lee & Thurl Ravenscroft	Released under Disneyland Records label.
Songs From Brigadoon And Other Favorites	1966	Salvador Camarata	Released under Disneyland Records label.
Songs From The Sound of Music	1966	Mary Martin	Released under Disneyland Records label.
Thumper's Great Race	1966	Various	Released under Disneyland Records label.
Walt Disney Presents The Story And Songs Of Black Beauty	1966	Robie Lester & The Jack Halloran Singers	Released under Disneyland Records label.
Walt Disney Presents The Story Of California	1966	Frances Archer, Beverly Gile & Disneyland Minstrels	Released under Disneyland Records label.
Walt Disney Presents the Story of The Seven Dwarfs and Their Diamond Mine	1966	Various	Released under Disneyland Records label. Later adapted as a Disney Read-Along book and LP in 1967.
Walt Disney's Story Of Bambi	1966	Various	Released under Disneyland Records label. Not to be confused with the 1957 album of the same name.
Walt Disney's Story Of Snow White And The Seven Dwarfs	1966	various	Released under Disneyland Records label. Not to be confused with the 1957 album of the same name
Walt Disney's Pirates Of The Caribbean: The Sound Track Of The Fabulous Disneyland Adventure	1966	Thurl Ravenscroft	Released under Disneyland Records label.
Walt Disney's Story Of Winnie The Pooh And The Honey Tree	1966	Various	Released under Disneyland Records label.
Are We Dancing	1967	Various	Released under Disneyland Records label.
The Bare Necessities / My Own Home	1967	Various	Released under Disneyland Records label.
Birthday, Birthday	1967	Various	Released under Disneyland Records label.
Colonel Hathi's March / Trust In Me	1967	Various	Released under Disneyland Records label.
Fortuosity / Watch Your Footwork	1967	Various	Released under Disneyland Records label.
Further Adventures of Jiminy Cricket	1967	Tom Campbell, Steve Gillette, Ned Washington & Leigh Harline	Released under Disneyland Records label.
The Gnome-Mobile	1967	Various	Released under Disneyland Records label.
The Happiest Millionaire: Original Cast Sound Track Album	1967	Various	Released under Buena Vista Records label.
I Wan'na Be Like You / That's What Friends Are For	1967	Various	Released under Disneyland Records label.
I'll Always Be Irish	1967	Various	Released under Disneyland Records label.
The Jungle Book (Original Soundtrack)	1967	Various; George Bruns; Terry Gilkyson; Richard M. Sherman; Robert B. Sherman	Released under Disneyland Records label.
Man of La Mancha	1967	Salvador Camarata & The Mike Sammes Singers	Released under Buena Vista Records label.
Necco Wafers Presents Sound track Songs and Dialog from Walt Disney's Bullwhip griffin	1967	Suzanne Pleshette	Released under Disneyland Records label. Released as promotional purchase with packaging of Necco Wafers
Rudyard Kipling's Just So Stories	1967	Salvador Camarata & Sterling Holloway	Released under Disneyland Records label.
Simple Simon	1967	Sterling Holloway	Released under Disneyland Records label.
Songs From Doctor Dolittle	1967	Salvador Camarata & The Mike Sammes Singers	Released under Disneyland Records label.
Songs from the Jungle Book and other Jungle Favorites	1967	Various	Released under Disneyland Records label.
Songs From Man of La Mancha	1967	Salvador Camarata, Mitch Leigh, Joe Darion & The Mike Sammes Singers	Released under Disneyland Records label.
Songs From Walt Disney's The Happiest Millionaire	1967	Various	Released under Disneyland Records label.
The Story Of Goldilocks And The Three Bears	1967	Robie Lester	Released under Disneyland Records label.
The Story Of Hansel And Gretel	1967	Various	Released under Disneyland Records label.
Walt Disney Presents Great Operas And Their Stories Volume I	1967	Various	Released under Disneyland Records label.
Walt Disney Presents Great Operas And Their Stories Volume II	1967	Various	Released under Disneyland Records label.
Walt Disney Presents the Story and Songs of The Jungle Book	1967	Various	Released under Disneyland Records label.
Walt Disney Presents Great Violin Concertos	1967	Various	Released under Disneyland Records label.
Walt Disney Presents The Story Of Blackbeard's Ghost	1967	Peter Ustinov And Dean Jones	Released under Disneyland Records label.
Walt Disney Presents The Story Of George And The Happiest Millionaire	1967	Various	Released under Disneyland Records label.
Walt Disney Presents Winnie the Pooh and the Blustery Day	1967	Various	Released under Disneyland Records label.
Walt Disney's The Adventures of Bullwhip Griffin	1967	Bryan Russell	Released under Disneyland Records label.
Walt Disney's Happiest Songs	1967	Various	Released under Disneyland Records label.
Walt Disney's Stories Of Uncle Remus	1967	Dal McKennon & James Baskett	Released under Disneyland Records label. Grammy Award for "Zip-a-Dee-Doo-Dah".
Yankee Doodle	1967	Rica Moore, Disneyland Concert Band & Glee Club	Released under Disneyland Records label.
The Carnival of the Animals	1968	Salvador Camarata & Symphonie-Orchester Graunke	Released under Buena Vista Records label.
Christmas Songs For Children	1968	Various	Released under Disneyland Records label.
Dakota / The Happiest Girl Alive	1968	Various	Released under Disneyland Records label.
Disney Songs the Satchmo Way	1968	Louis Armstrong	Released under Buena Vista Records label.
Doctor Dolittle	1968	Salvador Camarata & The Mike Sammes Singers	Released under Disneyland Records label.
The Enchanted Tiki Room & Jungle Cruise	1968	George Bruns & Thurl Ravenscroft	Released under Disneyland Records label. Known as Walt Disney Presents The Enchanted Tiki Room on the record cover.
Favorite Songs Of Christmas	1968	Various	Released under Disneyland Records label. 12 track version.
Favorite Songs Of Christmas	1968	Various	Released under Disneyland Records label. 4 track version.
How The Camel Got His Hump	1968	Various	Released under Disneyland Records label.
The Little Drummer Boy And Other Songs Of Christmas	1968	Disneyland Boys Choir, Camarata Chorus And Orchestra, The Mike Sammes Singers & Teri York	Released under Disneyland Records label.
Little Red Riding Hood	1968	Various	Released under Disneyland Records label.
Music From Three Walt Disney Motion Pictures - The Parent Trap! - Summer Magic - In Search Of The Castaways	1968	Various	Released under Disneyland Records label.
Now We Are Six	1968	A. A. Milne	Released under Disneyland Records label.
The One and Only, Genuine, Original Family Band	1968	Various	Released under Disneyland Records label.
Songs About Winnie The Pooh And Tigger	1968	Various	Released under Disneyland Records label.
Songs From Walt Disney's The Enchanted Tiki Room	1968	Various	Released under Disneyland Records label.
Songs From Heidi	1968	Salvador Camarata & Paul J. Smith	Released under Disneyland Records label.
Songs From Walt Disney's The One And Only, Genuine, Original Family Band	1968	Various	Released under Disneyland Records label.
The Story Of Heidi	1968	Various	Released under Disneyland Records label. 3 track version.
The Story Of Heidi	1968	Various	Released under Disneyland Records label. 6 track version.
The Story Of The Little Red Hen	1968	Various	Released under Disneyland Records label.
The Story Of Mickey And The Beanstalk	1968	Various	Released under Disneyland Records label.
The Story Of Winnie The Pooh And The Heffalumps	1968	Sterling Holloway & Salvador Camarata	Released under Disneyland Records label.
Ten Feet Off The Ground / West O' The Wide Missouri	1968	Various	Released under Disneyland Records label.
There's a Great Big Beautiful Tomorrow	1968	Vesey Walker &The Disneyland Band	Released under Disneyland Records label.
Till Eulenspiegel's Merry Pranks	1968	Symphonie-Orchester Graunke	Released under Buena Vista Records label.
The Ugly Duckling	1968	Ginny Tyler	Released under Disneyland Records label.
Walt Disney Presents Little Red Riding Hood & Other Best Loved Fairy Tales	1968	Rica Moore	Released under Disneyland Records label.
Walt Disney Presents Peter And The Wolf	1968	Sergei Prokofiev & Robie Lester	Released under Disneyland Records label.
Walt Disney Presents The Story Of The Grasshopper And The Ants	1968	Various	Released under Disneyland Records label.
Walt Disney Presents The Story Of The Swiss Family Robinson	1968	Kevin Corcoran	Released under Disneyland Records label.
Walt Disney's It's a Small World	1968	Various	Released under Disneyland Records label.
Walt Disney's Merriest Songs	1968	Various	Released under Disneyland Records label.
Walt Disney's Mickey Mouse And His Friends	1968	Various	Released under Disneyland Records label. Re-released 2005 on CD and again in 2010 on digital
Walt Disney's Story Of Babes In Toyland	1968	Various	Released under Disneyland Records label.
Walt Disney's Story Of Mickey Mouse, Brave Little Tailor	1968	Various	Released under Disneyland Records label.
When We Were Very Young	1968	A.A. Milne & Salvador Camarata	Released under Disneyland Records label.
Winnie The Pooh And The North Pole Expotition	1968	Sterling Holloway & Salvador Camarata	Released under Disneyland Records label.
Winnie the Pooh (Disney character) And Tigger	1968	Various	Released under Disneyland Records label.
21 Short Songs For Little People	1969	Frances Archer & Beverly Gile	Released under Disneyland Records label.
Children's Games	1969	Salvador Camarata	Released under Disneyland Records label.
Cowboy And Indian Songs	1969	Fess Parker	Released under Disneyland Records label.
Hang Your Hat On The Wind	1969	Randy Sparks	Released under Disneyland Records label.
More Jungle Book...Further Adventures of Baloo and Mowgli	1969	Phil Harris & Louis Prima	Released under Disneyland Records label. Later adapted as a Little Golden Book in 1973.
More Jungle Book... Further Adventures Of Baloo And Mowgli	1969	Various	Released under Disneyland Records label.
Mother Goose Suite and Children's Corner	1969	Salvador Camarata	Released under Disneyland Records label.
Peer Gynt Suite	1969	Symphonie-Orchester Graunke	Released under Disneyland Records label.
Songs From Oliver! And Chitty Chitty Bang Bang	1969	Salvador Camarata & The Mike Sammes Singers	Released under Disneyland Records label.
The Songs From The Wizard of Oz (Plus Songs About The Scarecrow And The Cowardly Lion)	1969	Various	Released under Disneyland Records label.
The Story Of The Gingerbread Man	1969	Salvador Camarata & Robie Lester	Released under Disneyland Records label.
The Story Of The Love Bug	1969	Buddy Hackett	Released under Disneyland Records label.
The Story And The Songs From The Cowardly Lion of Oz	1969	Salvador Camarata & The Mike Sammes Singers	Released under Disneyland Records label.
The Story and Song from The Haunted Mansion	1969	Various	Released under Disneyland Records label. Re-released in 2009 on CD and in 2018 on Digital.
The Story And Songs Of Misty The Mischievous Mermaid	1969	Various	Released under Disneyland Records label.
The Story and Songs of The Tin Woodman of Oz	1969	Salvador Camarata & The The Mike Sammes Singers	Released under Disneyland Records label.
The Story And Songs Of The Wizard of Oz	1969	Harold Arlen & Yip Harburg	Released under Disneyland Records label.
Walt Disney Presents Mother Goose Rhymes And Their Stories	1969	Rica Moore & Salvador Camarata	Released under Disneyland Records label.
Walt Disney's "Little Toot" And Other Sailor Songs	1969	Various	Released under Disneyland Records label.
Walt Disneys Story and Songs from Bambi	1969	Larry Morey & Frank Churchill	Released under Disneyland Records label.
Walt Disney Presents the Story Of Johnny Appleseed	1969	Various	Released under Disneyland Records label.
Walt Disney's Story Of Cinderella	1969	Various	Released under Disneyland Records label.
What Made the Red Man Red? / Second Star To The Right	1969	Candy Candido, The Mellomen & Jud Conlon	Released under Disneyland Records label.

=== 1970s ===
Title	U.S. release date	Artist	Notes
The Aristocats (Songs And Dialogue From The Original Motion Picture Soundtrack)	December 24, 1970	Various	Released under Disneyland Records label
Aladdin And His Wonderful Lamp	1970	Tony Brandon	Released under Disneyland Records label
The Arabian Nights (The Voyages Of Sinbad The Sailor)	1970	Various	Released under Disneyland Records label
The Aristocats	1970	Lois Lane, The Mike Sammes Singers & Phil Harris	Released under Disneyland Records label
The Aristocats And Other Cat Songs	1970	Various	Released under Disneyland Records label
The Boatniks	1970	Various	Released under Disneyland Records label.
The Emperor's New Clothes	1970	Tony Brandon & Lois Lane	Released under Disneyland Records label.
The Haunted Mansion	1970	Robie Lester	Released under Disneyland Records label. Re-released in 1976 & 1977. Not to be confused with the Album of the same name from 2009
Johnny Fedora And Alice Blue Bonnet	1970	Lois Lane	Released under Disneyland Records label.
The Little House	1970	Lois Lane & Tutti Camarata	Released under Disneyland Records label.
Pirates Of The Caribbean	1970	Thurl Ravenscroft	Released under Disneyland Records label.
Rubber Duckie And Other Songs From Sesame Street	1970	Various	Released under Disneyland Records label.
The Story Of Rapunzel	1970	Lois Lane & Katie Briggs	Released under Disneyland Records label.
The Story Of The Wizard Of Oz	1970	Lois Lane	Released under Disneyland Records label.
Walt Disney Presents The Story Of Robin Hood	1970	Robie Lester	Released under Disneyland Records label.
Walt Disney Presents The Story Of Thumper's Race	1970	Lois Lane, Thurl Ravenscroft & Robie Lester	Released under Disneyland Records label.
Walt Disney's Story Of Lambert, The Sheepish Lion	1970	Lois Lane & Jeromy Stuart	Released under Disneyland Records label.
Walt Disney's Story Of Mickey And The Beanstalk	1970	Lois Lane	Released under Disneyland Records label.
Walt Disney's Stoy of Pecos Bill	1970	Robie Lester & Jeromy Stuart	Released under Disneyland Records label.
Walt Disney's Story Of Susie, The Little Blue Coupe	1970	Robie Lester	Released under Disneyland Records label.
Walt Disney's Story Of The Ugly Duckling	1970	Various	Released under Disneyland Records label
Country Bear Jamboree (Original Soundtrack)	January 1, 1971	Various	Released under Disneyland Records label
Bedknobs And Broomsticks (Original Cast Soundtrack)	December 13, 1971	Various	Grammy Award nominee for Academy Award for Best Original Song.
Lady And The Tramp	1972	Various	Released under Disneyland Records label. Not to be confused with the 1955 Album of the same name
Walt Disney World Band	1972	Walt Disney World Band	Released under Buena Vista Records label.
It's A Small World - Walt Disney's Greatest Hits	July 1, 1973	The Mike Curb Congregation	Released under Buena Vista Records label.
Story And Songs From Robin Hood	November 8, 1973	Various	Released under Disneyland Records label
Walt Disney Presents Ferde Grofe's Grand Canyon Suite	1973	Ferde Grofé	Released under Buena Vista Records label.
Louis Prima Meets Robin Hood	1974	Louis Prima & Sam Butera and the Witnesses	Released under Disneyland Records label
Walt Disney's Song of The South Original Soundtrack	1974	various	Released under Disneyland Records label
An Adaptation of Dickens' Christmas Carol	1975	The Walt Disney Players	Released under Disneyland Records label. The album was originally issued with a supplementary 12-page illustrated storybook.
Mickey Mouse Alma Mater	1975	Various	Released under the Official Mickey Mouse Club label.
Mickey Mouse March	1975	Various	Released under the Official Mickey Mouse Club label.
Mousekedances	1975	Various	Released under the Official Mickey Mouse Club label.
Mouseketeer's Talent Round-Up	1975	Various	Released under the Official Mickey Mouse Club label.
Spin And Marty	1975	Various	Released under the Official Mickey Mouse Club label.
Walt Disney's Story Of Lady And The Tramp With Songs From The Film	1975	Various	Released under Disneyland Records label
Walt Disney's Davey Crockett and Songs of other Heros	1975	Fess Parker, The Mellomen, Leslie Nielsen & Disney Cast	Released under Disneyland Records label
Best Of Disney Volume One	1976	Various	Released under Disneyland Records label
Chicken Little	1976	Various	Released under Disneyland Records label. A Little Golden Book & Record.
The Happy Man And His Dump Truck	1976	Larry Groce	Released under Disneyland Records label. A Little Golden Book & Record.
The Little Engine That Could	1976	Larry Groce	Released under Disneyland Records label. A Little Golden Book & Record.
The Saggy Baggy Elephant	1976	Various	Released under Disneyland Records label. A Little Golden Book & Record.
The Taxi That Hurried	1976	Various	Released under Disneyland Records label. A Little Golden Book & Record.
Pete's Dragon: Songs and Dialogue from the Original Soundtrack	November 3, 1977	Various	Released under Disneyland Records label
The Many Adventures of Winnie the Pooh	1977	Richard M. Sherman, Robert B. Sherman, Buddy Baker	Released under Disneyland Records label
Story Of The Rescuers: Songs and Dialogue from the Original Soundtrack	1977	Various	Released under Disneyland Records label
Best Of Disney Volume Two	1978	Various	Released under Disneyland Records label
The Magical Music Of Walt Disney	1978	Various	Released in Collaboration with Ovation Records
Walt Disney Studios Presents Merry Christmas Songs	1978	Various	Released under Disneyland Records label
Chilling, Thrilling Sounds of the Haunted House	1979	Various	Released under Disneyland Records label. Not to be confused with the 1964 album of the same name.
Disney's Children's Favorites Volume I	1979	Larry Groce	Released under Disneyland Records label. Re-released in 1986, 1990, 1991, 1993 & 1996. Special Edition released in 1992 and re-released in 2008.
Disney's Children's Favorites Volume II	1979	Larry Groce	Released under Disneyland Records label. Re-released in 1986, 1990, 1991, 1993 & 1996. Special Edition released in 1992
Disney's Christmas Favorites	1979	Larry Groce, The Mike Sammes Singers And The Disneyland Children's Sing-along Chorus	Released under Disneyland Records label.
Mickey Mouse Disco	1979	Various	Released under Disneyland Records label
The Black Hole: Original Motion Picture Soundtrack	1979	John Barry	Released under Disneyland Records label. Intrada Records reissued the soundtrack in 2011 with previously unreleased tracks.
Walt Disney Productions' Story of The Black Hole	1979	Percy Rodriguez, John Barry and the cast of the film	Released under Disneyland Records label. The album was originally issued with a supplementary 12-page souvenir photo album.

=== 1980s ===
Title	U.S. release date	Artist	Notes
Star Wars - The Empire Strikes Back	January 1, 1980	Various	Released under Buena Vista Records label.
Walt Disney Productions' Pardners	January 1, 1980	Larry Groce	Released under Disneyland Records label.
The Return Of The King: A Story Of The Hobbits	May 11, 1980	Various	Released under Disneyland Records label.
The Official Album Of Disneyland/Walt Disney World	June 1, 1980	Various	Released under Disneyland Records label.
Goin' Quackers	1980	Various	Released under Disneyland Records label.
Disney's Merry Christmas Carols	1980	Various	Released under Disneyland Records label.
Popeye (Music from the Motion Picture)	1980	Harry Nilsson	Originally released by Boardwalk Records. Walt Disney Records reissued the album in 2000.
The Disney Family Christmas Album	July 1, 1981	Various	Released under Disneyland Records label.
The Sounds of Outerspace	1981	Michael Maraldo and Bob Kinsey	Released under Disneyland Records label.
The Fox and the Hound	1981	Various	Released under Disneyland Records label.
Walt Disney Productions' Mousercise	January 1, 1982	Various	Released under Disneyland Records label.
Tron: Original Motion Picture Soundtrack	July 9, 1982	Wendy Carlos & Journey	Originally released by CBS Records. Walt Disney Records reissued the album in 2002.
Mickey's Christmas Carol	1982	Alan Young	Released under Disneyland Records label.
The Story of Tron	1982	Chuck Riley, Wendy Carlos and the cast of the film	Released under Disneyland Records label.
The Official Album of Walt Disney World EPCOT Center	1983	Various	Released under Disneyland Records label.
Star Wars: Rebel Mission to Ord Mantell	1983	Various	Released under Buena Vista Records label. The album was released 29 years before Disney acquired the rights to Star Wars as part of its acquisition of Lucasfilm in 2012.
The Story Of Star Wars - Return Of The Jedi	1983	Chuck Riley, John Williams and the cast of the film	Released under Buena Vista Records label. The album was released 29 years before Disney acquired the rights to Star Wars as part of its acquisition of Lucasfilm in 2012.
Indiana Jones And The Temple Of Doom	1984	Various	Originally released by Polydor Records followed by Concord Records in 2008 as an expanded trilogy collection and finally by Walt Disney Records as a 5-CD box set of all 5 films on March 27, 2024
The Black Cauldron (Original Soundtrack)	May 26, 1985	Elmer Bernstein	A re-recorded version of the score was released by Varèse Sarabande in 1985. Walt Disney Records and Intrada Records released the film's original score in 2012.
The Black Cauldron	1985	Various	Released under Disneyland Records label. A 24-page Read-Along Book and Cassette
The story of The Goonies	1985	Jeff Cohen	Released under Buena Vista Records label.
Flight of the Navigator (Original Soundtrack Recording)	July 20, 1986	Alan Silvestri	Released in collaboration with Super Tracks Music Group
Disney's Children's Favorites Volume III	1986	Larry Groce	Released under Disneyland Records label. Re-released in 1990, 1991, 1993 & 1996. Special Edition released in 1992
Disney's Fluppy Dogs Lost And Found Fluppy	1986	Various	Released under Buena Vista Records label.
Mickey's Rock Around the Mouse	January 1, 1987	Various	Released under Disneyland Records label.
The Disney Collection: Volume One	1987	Various	Released Under Disneyland Records and Tapes. A 2 disc compilation collection released individually as 2 separate discs. Not to be confused with the 1991 or 1998 collections of similar names
A Family Christmas	1987	Various	Released Under Disneyland Records and Tapes.
Walt Disney's Donald Duck – Fun At The Fair / Pluto's Decorating Disaster	1987	Various	Released in Collaboration with Rainbow Communications Limited
Who Framed Roger Rabbit (Original Motion Picture Soundtrack)	June 22, 1988	Alan Silvestri	Released under Touchstone Records
Oliver & Company: Original Motion Picture Soundtrack	November 11, 1988	Various; J. A. C. Redford	It was the first release under the Walt Disney Records label. It was re-released on February 29, 1996.
Disney's Children's Favorite Silly Songs	1988	Various	Released Under Disneyland Records and Tapes.
The Disney Collection: Volume Two	1988	Various	Released Under Disneyland Records and Tapes. A 2 disc compilation collection released individually as 2 separate discs. Not to be confused with the 1991 or 1998 collections of similar names
Lullaby Favorites	1988	Various	Released Under Disneyland Records and Tapes.
The Music Of Disneyland, Walt Disney World And Epcot Center	1988	Various	Released Under Disneyland Records and Tapes.
Who Framed Roger Rabbit - As Told By Roger	1988	Charles Fleischer	Released Under Disneyland Records and Tapes.
The Little Mermaid: Original Motion Picture Soundtrack	October 19, 1989	Various; Alan Menken	

=== 1990s ===
Title	U.S. release date	Artist	Notes
Disney Children's Favorite Songs 4	January 1, 1990	Larry Groce	Re-released in 1991, 1993 & 1996. Special Edition released in 1992.
The Disney Afternoon Songbook (Music from Hit TV Shows)	September 10, 1990	Various	This compilation album features songs from Disney's Adventures of the Gummi Bears, TaleSpin, Chip N' Dales Rescue Rangers, and DuckTales. Re-released in 2008
The Disney Collection Vol. No. 1	January 1, 1991	Various	A 3 disc compilation collection released individually as 3 separate discs. Not to be confused with the 1987/1988 or 1998 collections of similar names
Feel The Music	January 1, 1991	Parachute Express	Released as part of the short lived Disney's Music Box Artist Series.
Happy To Be Here	January 1, 1991	Parachute Express	Released as part of the short lived Disney's Music Box Artist Series.
The Rescuers Down Under: Original Motion Picture Soundtrack	January 26, 1991	Bruce Broughton	A reissue of the soundtrack, including cues not featured in the film, was released on February 15, 2016, by Intrada Records.
For Our Children	March 1, 1991	Various	
The Disney Collection Vol. No. 2	March 12, 1991	Various	A 3 disc compilation collection released individually as 3 separate discs. Not to be confused with the 1987/1988 or 1998 collections of similar names
Foote Prints	April 19, 1991	Norman Foote	Released as part of the short lived Disney's Music Box Artist Series.
The Disney Collection Vol. No. 3	July 1, 1991	Various	A 3 disc compilation collection released individually as 3 separate discs. Not to be confused with the 1987/1988 or 1998 collections of similar names
Beauty and the Beast: Original Motion Picture Soundtrack	October 22, 1991	Various; Alan Menken	Academy Award winner for Best Original Song; Golden Globe Award for Best Original Song
Beauty and the Beast (Single)	November 25, 1991	Celine Dion & Peabo Bryson	Academy Award winner for Best Original Song; Golden Globe Award for Best Original Song
Country Music For Kids	January 1, 1992	Various	Released as part of the short lived Disney's Spotlight Artist Series
Disney's Music Box Artist Series / Disney's Spotlight Artist	January 1, 1992	Various	Released as a compilation as part of the short lived Disney's Music Box Artist Series & Disney's Spotlight Artist Series.
If The Shoe Fits	February 1, 1992	Norman Foote	Released as part of the short lived Disney's Music Box Artist Series.
Fantasmic!	May 13, 1992	Bruce Healey	Not to be confused with the 1998 and 2008 soundtracks of the same name
Honey, I Blew Up The Kid (Original Motion Picture Soundtrack)	May 31, 1992	Bruce Broughton	Released in Collaboration with Intrada Records. Re-released in 2009 and 2017.
The Music Of Disney - A Legacy In Song	September 14, 1992	Various	A 3 disc compilation Album.
Shake It All About	October 20, 1992	Little Richard	Released as part of the short lived Disney's Spotlight Artist Series
Aladdin: Original Motion Picture Soundtrack	October 27, 1992	Various; Alan Menken	Academy Award winner for Best Original Song and Best Original Score.
A Whole New World (Single)	November 5, 1992	Peabo Bryson & Regina Belle	
The Muppet Christmas Carol: Original Motion Picture Soundtrack	November 10, 1992	Various	Originally released by Jim Henson Records. Walt Disney Records reissued the album on digital on November 6, 2012.
For Our Children: The Concert	February 9, 1993	Various	Released as part of the short lived Disney's Spotlight Artist Series
Rock 'N Toontown	April 23, 1993	Craig 'N Co	Released as part of the short lived Disney's Music Box Artist Series.
Homeward Bound: The Incredible Journey (Original Motion Picture Soundtrack)	May 1, 1993	Bruce Broughton	Released in Collaboration with Intrada Records. Re-released in 2015
The Nightmare Before Christmas: Original Motion Picture Soundtrack	October 12, 1993	Danny Elfman	
Tombstone (Original Motion Picture Soundtrack)	December 25, 1993	Bruce Broughton	Released in Collaboration with Intrada Records. Re-released in 2006
The Lion King: Original Motion Picture Soundtrack	May 24, 1994	Various; Elton John	Academy Award winner for Best Original Song and Best Original Score.
Mickey Unrapped	September 20, 1994	Various	
Disney's Princess Collection	March 12, 1995	Various	A 2 disc compilation collection released individually as 2 separate discs.
Colors of the Wind (Single)	May 30, 1995	Vanessa Williams	
A Goofy Movie: Songs and Music from the Original Motion Picture Soundtrack	March 18, 1995	Various	
Pocahontas: An Original Walt Disney Records Soundtrack	May 30, 1995	Various; Alan Menken	Academy Award winner for Best Musical or Comedy Score.
If I Never Knew You (Single)	September 12, 1995	Jon Secada & Shanice	
Disney's It's a Small World and Other Disney Favorites	October 10, 1995	Various	
Toy Story: An Original Walt Disney Records Soundtrack	November 22, 1995	Randy Newman	
Muppet Treasure Island: Original Motion Picture Soundtrack	February 13, 1996	Hans Zimmer	Released by Angel Records.
Homeward Bound II: Lost In San Francisco (An Original Soundtrack)	March 1, 1996	Bruce Broughton	Released in Collaboration with Intrada Records. Re-released in 2016
James and the Giant Peach: An Original Walt Disney Records Album	April 12, 1996	Randy Newman	
The Hunchback of Notre Dame: An Original Walt Disney Records Soundtrack	May 7, 1996	Various; Alan Menken	
Someday (Single)	June 10, 1996	All-4-One	
Aladdin and the King of Thieves: An Original Walt Disney Records Album	August 13, 1996	Various	Includes songs from Aladdin and the King of Thieves and The Return of Jafar.
Music From The Park	September 10, 1996	Various	
Shadow Conspiracy (Original Motion Picture Soundtrack)	October 1, 1996	Bruce Broughton	Released in Collaboration with Intrada Records.
101 Dalmatians: An Original Walt Disney Records Soundtrack	November 12, 1996	Various; Michael Kamen	
That Darn Cat: An Original Walt Disney Records Soundtrack	February 11, 1997	Various	
Jungle 2 Jungle: A Walt Disney Records Soundtrack	February 18, 1997	Various	
Go the Distance (Single)	May 20, 1997	Michael Bolton	
Hercules: An Original Walt Disney Records Soundtrack	May 27, 1997	Various; Alan Menken	
George of the Jungle: An Original Walt Disney Records Soundtrack	June 24, 1997	Various	
The Lion King: Original Broadway Cast Recording	July 8, 1997	Various	
Pooh's Grand Adventure (Music from and Inspired by the Movie)	July 29, 1997	Various	
Beauty and the Beast: The Enchanted Christmas - New and Traditional Christmas Favorites	September 9, 1997	Various	
Flubber: An Original Walt Disney Records Soundtrack	November 18, 1997	Danny Elfman	
The Disney Collection Volume 1 – Favourite Original Soundtrack Recordings	January 1, 1998	Various	A 4 disc compilation collection released individually as 4 separate discs. Not to be confused with the 1987/1988 or 1991 collections of similar names
The Disney Collection Volume 2 – Favourite Original Soundtrack Recordings	January 1, 1998	Various	A 4 disc compilation collection released individually as 4 separate discs. Not to be confused with the 1987/1988 or 1991 collections of similar names
The Disney Collection Volume 3 – Favourite Original Soundtrack Recordings	January 1, 1998	Various	A 4 disc compilation collection released individually as 4 separate discs. Not to be confused with the 1987/1988 or 1991 collections of similar names
The Disney Collection Volume 4 – Favourite Original Soundtrack Recordings	January 1, 1998	Various	A 4 disc compilation collection released individually as 4 separate discs. Not to be confused with the 1987/1988 or 1991 collections of similar names
Music From Disney's Animal Kingdom	April 22, 1998	Various	Re-released in 2009
True To Your Heart (Single)	May 24, 1998	98° & Stevie Wonder	
Mulan: An Original Walt Disney Records Soundtrack	June 2, 1998	Various; Matthew Wilder	
Reflection (Single)	June 2, 1998	Christina Aguilera	
Disney's Princess Collection Vol. 2	June 9, 1998	Various	A 2 disc compilation collection released individually as 2 separate discs.
Return to Pride Rock: Songs Inspired by Disney's The Lion King II: Simba's Pride	September 8, 1998	Various	
Fantasmic!	October 15, 1998	Bruce Healey	Not to be confused with the 1992 and 2008 soundtracks of the same name
A Bug's Life: An Original Walt Disney Records Soundtrack	October 27, 1998	Randy Newman	
Honey, I Shrunk The Kids / In Country / Testament	January 1, 1999	James Horner	Released in collaboration with Natty Gann Records. Released as a three movie soundtrack. Released as Original Score for Honey, I Shrunk The Kids in 2009 and again in 2024
Radio Disney: Kid Jams	March 16, 1999	Various	
Mannheim Steamroller Meets the Mouse	March 16, 1999	Various	
Tarzan: An Original Walt Disney Records Soundtrack	May 18, 1999	Phil Collins	
The Haunted Mansion (30th Anniversary)	June 26, 1999	Various	Released in collaboration with RedDotNet on-demand kiosks at Disneyland & Walt Disney World called Disneyland Forever and Disney World Forever. Re-released in 2006 without track 12 & 13
Walt Disney World Resort 2000 The Official Album	October 1, 1999	Various	
Walt Disney World Millennium Celebration	October 5, 1999	Gavin Greenaway	Re-released as Illuminations: Reflections of Earth / Tapestry of Nations at an unknown date
Toy Story 2: An Original Walt Disney Records Soundtrack	November 9, 1999	Randy Newman	Grammy Award winner for Best Song Written for a Motion Picture, Television or Other Visual Media.
When She Loved Me (Single)	November 24, 1999	Sarah McLachlan	Grammy Award winner for Best Song Written for a Motion Picture, Television or Other Visual Media.
Fantasia 2000: An Original Walt Disney Records Soundtrack	November 30, 1999	Chicago Symphony Orchestra & the Philharmonia Orchestra	

=== 2000s ===
Title	U.S. release date	Artist	Notes
Radio Disney Jams, Vol. 2	February 29, 2000	Various	
Disney's An Extremely Goofy Movie Dance Party!	February 29, 2000	Various	
Dinosaur: An Original Walt Disney Records Soundtrack	May 20, 2000	James Newton Howard	
Pirates of the Caribbean (Limited Edition)	May 20, 2000	Various	Released in collaboration with RedDotNet on-demand kiosks at Disneyland & Walt Disney World called Disneyland Forever and Disney World Forever. Re-released in 2006 without the Bonus Tracks
Songs from The Little Mermaid 2: Return to the Sea & More!	September 19, 2000	Various	
Remember the Titans: An Original Walt Disney Motion Picture Soundtrack	September 19, 2000	Various	
Walt Disney World Resort Official Album	October 1, 2000	Various	
Radio Disney Holiday Jams	October 31, 2000	Various	
The Emperor's New Groove: Original Motion Picture Soundtrack	November 14, 2000	Various; John Debney	
102 Dalmatians: Music from and Inspired by the Film	November 22, 2000	Various; Dave Newman	
Festival Of The Lion King	January 1, 2001	Various	Released under Buena Vista Records label.
Recess: School's Out (Original Movie Soundtrack)	January 23, 2001	Various; Denis M. Hannigan	
Music from Disney's California Adventure	February 8, 2001	Various	
Radio Disney Jams, Vol. 3	February 13, 2001	Various	
Walt Disney World - SpectroMagic	April 2, 2001	Various	
Atlantis: The Lost Empire (Original Movie Soundtrack)	May 22, 2001	James Newton Howard	
Myra	June 8, 2001	Myra	
Illuminations: Reflections of Earth / Tapestry of Dreams	July 1, 2001	Gavin Greenaway	
The Princess Diaries: Original Soundtrack	July 21, 2001	Various; John Debney	
Official Album - Walt Disney World Resort Celebrating 100 Years Of Magic	September 20, 2001	Various	
Disney Meets Jazz - Tribute to Walt Disney	September 19, 2001	Gil Goldstein	
Radio Disney Jams, Vol. 4	September 25, 2001	Various	
Disney's Magic In The Streets: Parade Memories	October 1, 2001	Various	
The Journey of Natty Gann (Original Motion Picture Soundtrack)	October 9, 2001	James Horner	Re-released in 2009 on Intrada Records.
Milagros	October 16, 2001	Myra	
Monsters, Inc. (An Original Walt Disney Records Soundtrack)	October 23, 2001	Randy Newman	The album was nominated for the Academy Award for Best Original Score and a Grammy Award for Best Score Soundtrack for Visual Media.
The Rescuers Down Under (Soundtrack from the Motion Picture) [Bonus Track Version]	January 1, 2002	Bruce Broughton & Shelby Flint	
Snow Dogs: (Original Motion Picture Score)	January 18, 2002	John Debney	
Disney's Princess Favorites, Featuring Songs from Cinderella II: Dreams Come True	February 2, 2002	Various	
Return to Never Land (Original Soundtrack)	February 5, 2002	Joel McNeely	
Lilo & Stitch: An Original Walt Disney Records Soundtrack	June 4, 2002	Various; Alan Silverstri	
The Country Bears (Original Soundtrack)	July 23, 2002	Various; Christopher Young	
Lizzie McGuire: Songs from the Hit TV Show on Disney Channel	August 13, 2002	Various	
Radio Disney's Pop Dreamers	August 20, 2002	Various	
Radio Disney Jams, Vol. 5	September 10, 2002	Various	
Disneymania	September 17, 2002	Various; George S. Clinton	
Radio Disney Holiday Jams 2	October 31, 2002	Various	
The Santa Clause 2 (Original Soundtrack)	November 5, 2002	Various	
Treasure Planet (An Original Walt Disney Records Soundtrack)	November 19, 2002	James Newton Howard	
The Jungle Book 2: Songs from the Film and Other Jungle Favorites	February 2, 2003	Various; Joel McNeely	
Piglet's Big Movie (Original Soundtrack)	March 25, 2003	Carly Simon	
Holes (Original Soundtrack)	April 15, 2003	Various; Joel McNeely	
The Lizzie McGuire Movie (Original Motion Picture Soundtrack)	April 22, 2003	Various; Cliff Eidelman	
Finding Nemo (Original Motion Picture Soundtrack)	May 30, 2003	Thomas Newman	
Kim Possible: Songs from and Inspired by the Hit TV Series	July 22, 2003	Various	
Pirates of the Caribbean: The Curse of the Black Pearl (Original Soundtrack)	July 22, 2003	Klaus Badelt	
The Cheetah Girls: Songs from the Disney Channel Original Movie	August 12, 2003	Various	
Radio Disney Jams, Vol. 6	September 9, 2003	Various	
The Lion King: Special Edition	September 30, 2003	Various; Elton John	Includes music from the original 1994 The Lion King soundtrack, with two additional tracks.
Disneyland Haunted Mansion Holiday	October 2, 2003	Various	
The Haunted Mansion (Original Motion Picture Soundtrack)	October 16, 2003	Mark Mancina	
Brother Bear: An Original Walt Disney Records Soundtrack	October 21, 2003	Phil Collins	
The Official Album. Where Magic Lives. Walt Disney World	October 21, 2003	Various	
The Haunted Mansion: Haunted Hits	November 25, 2003	Various	A compilation album of pop music inspired by the 2003 Haunted Mansion film.
Fantasia 2000 (Storyteller Version) - EP	January 1, 2004	Pat Carroll	A Deluxe Read-Along CD reading the stories of The Sorcerer's Apprentice and Noah's Ark from the Movie Fantasia 2000 segments The Sorcerer's Apprentice and Pomp and Circumstance, Marches No. 1, 2, 3, & 4
The Rescuers Down Under - Storyteller Version	January 1, 2004	William Woodson	
Pixel Perfect: Songs from the Disney Channel Original Movie	January 13, 2004	Various	
Teacher's Pet (Original Soundtrack)	January 13, 2004	Various	
Disneymania 2	January 27, 2004	Various	
The Lion King 1½: Songs From Timon and Pumbaa's Hilarious Adventure	February 10, 2004	Various	
Confessions of a Teenage Drama Queen (Original Soundtrack)	February 17, 2004	Various; Mark Mothersbaugh	
Home on the Range: An Original Walt Disney Records Soundtrack	March 30, 2004	Various; Alan Menken	
Radio Disney Ultimate Jams	April 6, 2004	Various	
The Proud Family: Songs from the Hit TV Series	April 20, 2004	Various	
Zenon Z3: Songs from the Disney Channel Original Movie	June 8, 2004	Various	
Around the World in 80 Days (Original Motion Picture Soundtrack)	June 15, 2004	Trevor Jones	
The Cheetah Girls: Special Edition Soundtrack	June 22, 2004	Various	
The Official Album: Where Magic Lives. Walt Disney World	July 1, 2004	Various	
Stuck in the Suburbs – Original Soundtrack	July 13, 2004	Various	
The Princess Diaries 2: Royal Engagement: Original Soundtrack	August 3, 2004	Various; John Debney	
Mickey, Donald, Goofy: The Three Musketeers (Original Soundtrack)	August 10, 2004	Various	Re-released in 2018 on Intrada Records.
Lizzie McGuire: Total Party!	August 31, 2004	Various	
The Lion King II: Simba's Pride (Original Soundtrack)	August 31, 2004	Various	Features songs previously released on Return to Pride Rock - The Lion King II: Simba's Pride
Disney Magic	September 20, 2004	Various	
Disney Princess: The Ultimate Song Collection	September 21, 2004	Various	
Wishes - A Magical Gathering Of Disney Dreams	October 9, 2004	Various	
Radio Disney Jingle Jams	October 12, 2004	Various	
Disney Channel Hits: Take 1	October 26, 2004	Various	
Greatest Disney TV & Film Hits	October 26, 2004	Christy Carlson Romano	
The Incredibles (Music from the Motion Picture)	November 2, 2004	Michael Giacchino	
Mulan II (Original Soundtrack)	January 25, 2005	Joel McNeely	
The Best Of Pooh & Heffalumps, Too	February 8, 2005; Joel McNeely	Various	A compilation album featuring songs from Pooh's Heffalump Movie, Piglet's Big Movie, Winnie the Pooh and the Honey Tree, & Winnie the Pooh and the Blustery Day.
Disney's Aladdin: A Musical Spectacular	February 12, 2005	Various	
Disneymania 3	February 15, 2005	Various	
Here Come the ABCs	February 15, 2005	They Might Be Giants	Children's album by the alternative rock band They Might Be Giants. Also released as a DVD, and a CD/DVD combo set.
Ice Princess (Original Soundtrack)	March 15, 2005	Various	
Radio Disney Jams, Vol. 7	March 22, 2005	Various	
Disney Channel Hits: Take 2	April 26, 2005	Various	
Disney's Happiest Celebration On Earth	May 3, 2005	Various	
The Happiest Celebration On Earth - The Official Album Of The Walt Disney World Resort	May 26, 2005	Various	
Disney Girlz Rock	June 7, 2005	Various	
Go Figure: Songs from the Disney Channel Original Movie	June 7, 2005	Various	
Herbie: Fully Loaded (Original Soundtrack)	June 21, 2005	Various; Mark Mothersbaugh	
Sky High (Original Soundtrack)	July 26, 2005	Various; Michael Giacchino	
Radio Disney: Move It!	August 2, 2005	Various	
A Musical History of Disneyland	September 5, 2005	Various	A 6-disc set celebrating the 50th anniversary of Disneyland.
Disneyremixmania	September 25, 2005	Various	
Cheetah-licious Christmas	October 11, 2005	The Cheetah Girls	
Radio Disney Jingle Jams 2	October 11, 2005	Various	
Chicken Little (Original Soundtrack)	November 1, 2005	Various; John Debney	
The Chronicles of Narnia: The Lion, the Witch and the Wardrobe (Original Soundtrack)	December 13, 2005	Various; Harry Gregson-Williams	
High School Musical (An Original Walt Disney Soundtrack)	January 10, 2006	Various	
Bambi II: A Collection of New and Classic Bambi Music	February 7, 2006	Various; Bruce Broughton	
Radio Disney Jams, Vol. 8	February 7, 2006	Various	
That's So Raven Too!: More Songs from and Inspired by the Hit TV Series	March 7, 2006	Various	
The Shaggy Dog (Music from and Inspired By)	March 14, 2006	Alan Menken	
DEV2.O	March 14, 2006	DEV2.O	Released under Disney Sound label.
Disneymania 4	April 4, 2006	Various	
That's So Raven: Songs from and Inspired by the Hit TV Series	April 24, 2006	Various	
Cars (Original Motion Picture Soundtrack)	June 6, 2006	Various; Randy Newman	
Where Magic Lives - Official Album	June 6, 2006	Various	
The Nightmare Before Christmas: Special Edition	June 21, 2006	Danny Elfman	2-disc reissue of original soundtrack with additional bonus tracks of cover songs from Marilyn Manson, Fiona Apple, Fall Out Boy, and more.
Tarzan: The Broadway Musical (Original 2006 Broadway Cast)	June 27, 2006	Various	
Pirates of the Caribbean: Dead Man's Chest (Soundtrack from the Motion Picture)	July 4, 2006	Hans Zimmer	
Radio Disney: Party Jams	October 10, 2006	Various	
Welcome to Ralph's World	October 3, 2006	Ralph's World	Released under Disney Sound label.
The Cheetah Girls 2 (Original Soundtrack)	October 15, 2006	The Cheetah Girls	
Hannah Montana: Songs from and Inspired by the Hit TV Series	October 24, 2006	Hannah Montana	
The Santa Clause 3: The Escape Clause (Original Soundtrack)	October 31, 2006	Various; George S. Clinton	
Walt Disney Records: Archive Collection, Vol. 1	November 7, 2006	Various	
Walt Disney Records: Archive Collection, Vol. 2	November 7, 2006	Various	
The Cheetah Girls 2: Special Edition (Original Soundtrack)	November 7, 2006	The Cheetah Girls	
Jump In! (Original Soundtrack)	January 9, 2007	Various	
House of Mouse (Original Soundtrack)	February 10, 2007	Various	
Bridge to Terabithi (Music from and Inspired By)	February 13, 2007	Aaron Zigman	
Everlife	February 20, 2007	Everlife	
Hannah Montana & Miley Cyrus: Best of Both Worlds Concert	March 11, 2007	Jonas Brothers, Hannah Montana & Miley Cyrus	
Radio Disney Jams, Vol. 9	March 13, 2007	Various	
The Very Best of Disney Channel	March 26, 2007	Various	
Disneymania 5	March 27, 2007	Various	
Meet the Robinsons (Soundtrack from the Motion Picture)	March 27, 2007	Various; Danny Elfman	
High School Musical: The Concert	May 1, 2007	Various	
Pirates of the Caribbean: At World's End (Soundtrack from the Motion Picture)	May 22, 2007	Hans Zimmer	
Hannah Montana 2: Meet Miley Cyrus	June 26, 2007	Hannah Montana & Miley Cyrus	This double album serves as a soundtrack to the second season of Hannah Montana TV show and as a debut album for Miley Cyrus.
Ratatouille (Original Motion Picture Soundtrack)	June 26, 2007	Michael Giacchino	
In Concert: The Party's Just Begun Tour	July 10, 2007	The Cheetah Girls	
Home At Last	July 24, 2007	Billy Ray Cyrus	
Underdog (Original Soundtrack)	July 24, 2007	Randy Edelman	
High School Musical 2 (Original Soundtrack)	August 14, 2007	Various	
Finding Nemo – The Musical	September 25, 2007	Various	
Magic Kingdom (Event Party Music)	September 28, 2007	Various	
Disney Channel Holiday	October 16, 2007	Various	
Enchanted (Soundtrack from the Motion Picture)	November 20, 2007	Alan Menken	
High School Musical Hits Remixed	December 11, 2007	Various	
National Treasure: Book of Secrets (Original Soundtrack)	December 18, 2007	Trevor Rabin	
High School Musical 2: Non-Stop Dance Party	December 26, 2007	Various	This album includes remixed versions of songs previously featured on the High School Musical 2 soundtrack.
Disney Box Office Hits	January 1, 2008	Various	
Radio Disney Jams, Vol. 10	January 22, 2008	Various	
Hannah Montana 2: Non-Stop Dance Party	January 29, 2008	Hannah Montana	This album includes remixed versions of songs previously featured on Hannah Montana 2.
Fantasmic!	January 29, 2008	Bruce Healey	Not to be confused with the 1992 and 1998 soundtracks of the same name
Here Come the 123s	February 8, 2008	They Might Be Giants	Children's album by the alternative rock band They Might Be Giants. Was released as a CD/DVD combo set.
The Chronicles of Narnia: Prince Caspian (An Original Walt Disney Records Soundtrack)	May 13, 2008	Harry Gregson-Williams	
Disneymania 6	May 20, 2008	Various	
Camp Rock: Music from the Disney Channel Original Movie	June 17, 2008	Various	
WALL-E (Original Motion Picture Soundtrack)	June 24, 2008	Various; Thomas Newman	
The Cheetah Girls: One World	August 19, 2008	The Cheetah Girls	
Hannah Montana Hits Remixed	September 9, 2008	Hannah Montana	
Disney Girlz Rock 2	September 9, 2008	Various	
Princess Disneymania	September 20, 2008	Various	
Nightmare Revisited	September 30, 2008	Various	A compilation of cover songs from Danny Elfman's Nightmare Before Christmas soundtrack to honor the album's 13th anniversary.
Tinker Bell - Songs from and Inspired by Disney Fairies	October 14, 2008	Various; Joel McNeely	
High School Musical 3: Senior Year (Original Motion Picture Soundtrack)	October 21, 2008	Various	
Four Parks: One World (Walt Disney World Official Album)	November 1, 2008	Various	
Bolt: Original Motion Picture Soundtrack	November 18, 2008	John Powell	
Bedtime Stories (Original Motion Picture Soundtrack)	December 21, 2008	Various	
The Haunted Mansion	January 1, 2009	Various	Not to be confused with the Album of the same name from 1970
Radio Disney Jams, Vol. 11	January 27, 2009	Various	
Honey, I Shrunk The Kids (Original Motion Picture Soundtrack)	March 6, 2009	James Horner	Released in Collaboration with Intrada Records. Originally released in 1999 as a three movie soundtrack and again in 2024.
Race to Witch Mountain (Soundtrack from the Motion Picture)	March 10, 2009	Various	
Hannah Montana: The Movie (Original Motion Picture Soundtrack)	March 24, 2009	Various	
Walt Disney And The 1964 World's Fair	March 24, 2009	Various	
G-Force: Original Motion Picture Soundtrack	May 1, 2009	Various	
The Rhyming Circus	May 20, 2009	Ralph's World	Released under Disney Sound label.
Disney/Pixar Greatest (Original Soundtrack)	May 26, 2009	Various	A compilation album with featured selections from Toy Story, Toy Story 2, Monsters, Inc., Finding Nemo, Cars, Ratatouille, and Up soundtracks.
Up (Original Motion Picture Soundtrack)	May 26, 2009	Michael Giacchino	
Mitchel Musso	June 2, 2009	Mitchel Musso	
Disney Channel Playlist	June 9, 2009	Various	
Hannah Montana 3	July 7, 2009	Hannah Montana	
Wizards of Waverly Place: Songs from and Inspired by the Hit TV Series	August 4, 2009	Various	
Here Comes Science	September 1, 2009	They Might Be Giants	Children's album by the alternative rock band They Might Be Giants. Was released as a CD/DVD set.
Phineas and Ferb: Songs from the Hit Disney TV Series	September 22, 2009	Various	
Tinker Bell and the Lost Treasure (Original Soundtrack)	September 22, 2009	Various; Joel McNeely	
Read Between the Lines	September 22, 2009	KSM	
The Sherman Brothers Songbook	October 13, 2009	Various	A compilation of songs written by composer-lyricist Richard M. Sherman and Robert B. Sherman. It includes the Sherman Brothers' work for Disney and their non-Disney output.
Los Lobos Goes Disney	October 27, 2009	Los Lobos	Released under Disney Sound label.
A Christmas Carol: Original Soundtrack	November 3, 2009	Alan Silvestri	
Songs from Pocahontas II: Journey to a New World	November 23, 2009	Various	
The Princess and the Frog (Original Motion Picture Soundtrack)	November 24, 2009	Various; Randy Newman	

=== 2010s ===
Title	U.S. release date	Artist	Notes
StarStruck: Original Motion Picture Soundtrack	February 9, 2010	Various	
Alice in Wonderland (An Original Walt Disney Records Soundtrack)	March 2, 2010	Danny Elfman	
Almost Alice: Music Inspired by the Motion Picture	March 2, 2010	Various	Released under Buena Vista Records label.
Disneymania 7	March 9, 2010	Various	
Radio Disney Jams, Vol. 12	March 30, 2010	Various	
Prince of Persia: The Sands of Time (Original Motion Picture Soundtrack)	May 17, 2010	Harry Gregson-Williams	
The Disney Reggae Club	June 8, 2010	Various	
Toy Story 3 (Original Motion Picture Soundtrack)	June 15, 2010	Randy Newman	Academy Award winner for Best Original Song
The Sorcerer's Apprentice: Original Motion Picture Soundtrack	July 6, 2010	Trevor Rabin	
Sonny with a Chance: Songs from and Inspired by the Hit TV Series	October 5, 2010	Various	
Hannah Montana Forever	October 15, 2010	Hannah Montana	
Phineas and Ferb: Holiday Favorites	October 20, 2010	Various	
Tangled (Original Motion Picture Soundtrack)	November 16, 2010	Alan Menken	Academy Award nominee for Best Original Song
Tron: Legacy—Original Motion Picture Soundtrack	December 6, 2010	Daft Punk	
Aulani: Music of the Maka'ala	January 1, 2011	Kealiʻi Reichel	
Disney Jazz: Everybody Wants to Be a Cat, Vol. 1	January 1, 2011	Various	
I'm Invisible (From Radio Disney "N.B.T. - Next BIG Thing") - Single	January 1, 2011	Ladina Spence	
I'm Invisible (From Radio Disney "N.B.T. - Next BIG Thing") - Single	January 1, 2011	Tay Barton	
I'm So Over You (From Radio Disney "N.B.T. - Next BIG Thing") - Single	January 1, 2011	Hollywood Ending	
In the Key of Disney	January 1, 2011	Brian Wilson	
Invisible (From Radio Disney "N.B.T. - Next BIG Thing") - Single	January 1, 2011	Ladina Spence	
Live U, Love U, Breathe U (From Radio Disney "N.B.T. - Next BIG Thing") - Single	January 1, 2011	Tay Barton	
Radio Disney's N.B.T.: Season 4 - The Singles	January 1, 2011	Various	
Serious (From Radio Disney "N.B.T. - Next BIG Thing") - Single	January 1, 2011	Zack Montana	
Shake It Up (From "Shake It Up") - Single	January 1, 2011	Selena Gomez	
Shake It Up: Break It Down	January 1, 2011	Various	
Short's With Me (From Radio Disney "N.B.T. - Next BIG Thing") - Single	January 1, 2011	Zack Montana	
Spotlight (From Radio Disney "N.B.T. - Next BIG Thing") - Single	January 1, 2011	Shealeigh	
Watch me (feat. Bella Thorne & Zendaya) - Single	January 1, 2011	Bella Thorne & Zendaya	
What Can I Say? (From Radio Disney "N.B.T. - Next BIG Thing") - Single	January 1, 2011	Shealeigh	
You Got Me (From Radio Disney "N.B.T. Next Big Thing") - Single	January 1, 2011	Hollywood Ending	
Gnomeo & Juliet (Original Motion Picture Soundtrack)	February 8, 2011	Various	Released under Buena Vista Records label.
Tron: Legacy Reconfigured	April 5, 2011	Daft Punk	
Lemonade Mouth: Original Soundtrack	April 12, 2011	Various	
The World I Knew (From "Disneynature: African Cats") - Single	April 12, 2011	Jordin Sparks	
Sharpay's Fabulous Adventure: Soundtrack from the Motion Picture	April 19, 2011	Various	
Thor (Original Motion Picture Soundtrack)	May 3, 2011	Patrick Doyle	Released under Buena Vista Records label.
Pirates of the Caribbean: On Stranger Tides—Original Motion Picture Soundtrack	May 17, 2011	Hans Zimmer	
Cars 2 (Original Motion Picture Soundtrack)	June 4, 2011	Michael Giacchino	
Captain America: The First Avenger—Original Motion Picture Soundtrack	June 19, 2011	Alan Silvestri	Released under Buena Vista Records label.
Winnie the Pooh: Original Motion Picture Soundtrack	July 12, 2011	Henry Jackman	
Phineas and Ferb: Across the 1st and 2nd Dimensions	August 2, 2011	Various	
Radio Disney Jams: 15th Birthday Edition	August 16, 2011	Various	
Muppets: The Green Album	August 23, 2011	Various	
Best of The Lion King	September 6, 2011	Various; Elton John	
The Muppets (Original Motion Picture Soundtrack)	November 22, 2011	Various	Academy Award winner for Best Original Song
Disney Channel Holiday Playlist	January 1, 2012	Various	
Fashion Is My Kryptonite (From "Shake It Up: Made In Japan") - Single	January 1, 2012	Bella Thorne & Zendaya	
The Lost Chords: The Aristocats - EP	January 1, 2012		Lost Chords are a collection of music, both demos and recordings, that were written but never made it into the final product
The Lost Chords: Cinderella	January 1, 2012	Various	Lost Chords are a collection of music, both demos and recordings, that were written but never made it into the final product
The Lost Chords: The Rescuers	January 1, 2012	Various	Lost Chords are a collection of music, both demos and recordings, that were written but never made it into the final product
A Musical Tour: Treasures of the Walt Disney Archives at The Reagan Library	January 1, 2012	Various	
Rise (feat. McClain Sisters) [From "Disneynature: Chimpanzee"] - Single	January 1, 2012	Disney Friends for Change	
Season 5, Vol. 2 (From Radio Disney "N.B.T." Next BIG Thing) - EP	January 1, 2012	Various	
Shake It Up: Live 2 Dance (Music from the Original TV Series)	January 1, 2012	Various	
Shake It Up: Live 2 Dance (Music from the Original TV Series) [Deluxe Edition]	January 1, 2012	Various	
Shake It Up: Made in Japan - Single	January 1, 2012	Various	
Something to Dance For (From "Shake It Up: Live 2 Dance") - Single	January 1, 2012	Zendaya	
That's Falling in Love (From "Talking Angela") - Single	January 1, 2012	Chelsea Ward	
TTYLXOX (From "Shake It Up Live 2 Dance") - Single	January 1, 2012	Bella Thorne	
You Get Me (from "Talking Friends") - Single	January 1, 2012	Jamie Houston and Renee Sandstorm	
Classically Disney: String Quartet Interpretations of Disney Standards	February 20, 2012	Various	Disney Parks exclusive
Radio Rebel (Original Soundtrack)	February 21, 2012	Various	
John Carter: Original Motion Picture Soundtrack	March 6, 2012	Michael Giacchino	
Phineas and Ferb: Summer Belongs to You	May 22, 2012	Various	
Let It Shine: (Original TV Movie Soundtrack)	June 12, 2012	Various	
Brave: Original Motion Picture Soundtrack	June 19, 2012	Patrick Doyle	
Ukulele Disney	July 25, 2012	Jake Shimabukuro	
The Odd Life of Timothy Green: Original Soundtrack	August 14, 2012	Geoff Zanelli	
The Great Divide (From "Secret of the Wings") - Single	September 12, 2012	McClain Sisters	
Frankenweenie (Original Motion Picture Soundtrack)	September 25, 2012	Danny Elfman	
Frankenweenie Unleashed! (Music Inspired by the Motion Picture)	September 25, 2012	Various; Danny Elfman	
Season 5: First Listen (From Radio Disney "N.B.T." Next BIG Thing) - EP	September 25, 2012	Various	
Disney Channel Holiday Playlist	October 2, 2012	Various	
Disney Jingle Bell Fun	October 2, 2012	Various	
Disney Fairies: Faith, Trust and Pixie Dust	October 16, 2012	Various	
Make Your Mark: Ultimate Playlist	October 16, 2012	Various	
Wreck-It Ralph: Original Motion Picture Soundtrack	October 30, 2012	Henry Jackman	
Austin & Ally: Music from the Disney Channel Series	September 11, 2012	Ross Lynch	
Now That's What I Call Disney	November 6, 2012	Various	Originally released in the United Kingdom on November 21, 2011
Club Penguin: The Party Starts Now!	November 22, 2012	Various	
The Lost Chords: Peter Pan	January 1, 2013	Various	Lost Chords are a collection of music, both demos and recordings, that were written but never made it into the final product
We Love Disney	December 2, 2013	Various	Released by Mercury Records France Edition
Sofia the First: Songs from Enchancia - Sofia the First	December 4, 2012	Various	
Doc McStuffins: The Doc Is In (Music from the TV Series)	January 1, 2013	Various	
Doc McStuffins: Cuddles and Care	January 1, 2013	Various	
Disney Junior Magical Holidays [Single]	January 1, 2013	Genevieve Goings	
Minnie's Favorites (Songs from "Mickey Mouse Clubhouse")	January 1, 2013	Various	
Sofia the First (Soundtrack from the TV Series)	February 12, 2013	Various	
Shake It Up (I <3 Dance) (Music from the TV Series)	March 5, 2013	Various	
Oz the Great and Powerful (Original Motion Picture Soundtrack)	March 8, 2013	Danny Elfman	
Monsters University (Original Soundtrack)	June 18, 2013	Randy Newman	
The Lone Ranger: Wanted	July 2, 2013	Various	
The Lone Ranger (Original Motion Picture Score)	July 2, 2013	Hans Zimmer	
Teen Beach Movie (Original TV Movie Soundtrack)	July 15, 2013	Various	
Planes (Original Motion Picture Soundtrack)	August 6, 2013	Mark Mancina	
The Muppet Movie: Original Soundtrack Recording	August 13, 2013	Various	Reissue
Disneyland Resort Official Album	August 20, 2013	Various	
Walt Disney World Official Album	August 20, 2013	Various	
Rockin' and Rollin'	September 10, 2013	Various	
Disney Holidays Unwrapped	October 15, 2013	Various	
Disney Junior: Boo! For Your Halloween (Single)	October 22, 2013	Genevieve Goings	
Disney Classics	November 12, 2013	Various	4-disc compilation album, including music from films, TV, and theme parks.
Frozen (Original Motion Picture Soundtrack)	November 25, 2013	Various; Christophe Beck	Academy Award winner for Best Original Song
Saving Mr. Banks (Original Motion Picture Soundtrack)	December 10, 2013	Thomas Newman	Academy Award nominee for Best Original Score
Austin & Ally: Turn It Up	December 17, 2013	Ross Lynch & Laura Marano	
Carry On (From "Disneynature: Bears") - Single	January 1, 2014	Olivia Holt	
Disney Channel Play It Loud	January 1, 2014	Various	
Once Upon a Dream (From "Maleficent") - Single	January 1, 2014	Lana Del Rey	
Sofia the First: Songs from Enchancia (Music from the TV Series)	January 28, 2014	Various	
Disney Channel Play It Loud	February 11, 2014	Various	
Disney Junior DJ Shuffle	March 18, 2014	Various	
Muppets Most Wanted (Original Motion Picture Soundtrack)	March 18, 2014	Various	
Muppets Most Wanted (Original Score)	April 15, 2014	Christophe Beck	
Dconstructed	April 22, 2014	Various	
The Rescue (Original Motion Picture Soundtrack)	April 28, 2014	Bruce Broughton	Released in Collaboration with Intrada Records
Million Dollar Arm (Original Motion Picture Soundtrack)	May 13, 2014	A. R. Rahman	
Maleficent (Original Motion Picture Soundtrack)	May 27, 2014	James Newton Howard	
Aladdin (Original Broadway Cast Recording)	May 27, 2014	Alan Menken, Howard Ashman, Tim Rice	
The Legacy Collection: The Lion King	June 24, 2014	Various	
Planes: Fire & Rescue: Original Motion Picture Soundtrack	July 15, 2014	Mark Mancina	
The Legacy Collection: Mary Poppins	August 26, 2014	Various	
Alexander and the Terrible, Horrible, No Good, Very Bad Day (Music from the Motion Picture)	October 7, 2014	Various	
The Legacy Collection: Sleeping Beauty	October 7, 2014	Various	
Big Hero 6 (Original Motion Picture Soundtrack)	November 4, 2014	Henry Jackman	
We Love Disney	November 14, 2014	Various	Released by Universal Music Australia Australia Edition
The Legacy Collection: The Little Mermaid	November 24, 2014	Various	
Into the Woods (Original Motion Picture Soundtrack)	December 16, 2014	Various	
Disney Junior DJ Shuffle 2	January 1, 2015	Various	
The Legacy Collection: Fantasia	January 13, 2015	Various	
Strange Magic (Original Motion Picture Soundtrack)	January 20, 2015	Various; Marius de Vries	Released under Buena Vista Records label.
Tinker Bell and the Lost Treasure (Original Score)	February 2, 2015	Various; Joel McNeely	Released in Collaboration with Intrada Records
The Legacy Collection: Pinocchio	February 10, 2015	Various	
McFarland, USA (Original Motion Picture Soundtrack)	February 17, 2015	Antônio Pinto	
Cinderella (Original Motion Picture Soundtrack)	March 10, 2015	Patrick Doyle	
Making Today a Perfect Day ("From Frozen Fever") [Single]	March 12, 2015	Idina Menzel & Kristen Bell	
Liv and Maddie (Music from the TV Series)	March 17, 2015	Various	
Austin & Ally: Take It from the Top (Music from the TV Series)	March 31, 2015	Ross Lynch & Laura Marano	
Disneynature: Monkey Kingdom (Original Motion Picture Soundtrack)	April 21, 2015	Various & Harry Gregson-Williams	
Radio Disney Music Awards	April 21, 2015	Various	
The Legacy Collection: Lady and the Tramp	April 28, 2015	Various	
Tomorrowland (Original Motion Picture Soundtrack)	May 19, 2015	Michael Giacchino	
The Legacy Collection: Disneyland	May 20, 2015	Various	
Inside Out: Original Soundtrack	June 16, 2015	Michael Giacchino	
The Legacy Collection: Cinderella	June 16, 2015	Various	
Teen Beach 2 (Original TV Movie Soundtrack)	June 22, 2015	Various	
The Legacy Collection: Toy Story	July 10, 2015	Randy Newman	
Descendants (Original TV Movie Soundtrack)	July 31, 2015	Various	
The Legacy Collection: Pocahontas	August 7, 2015	Various	
The Legacy Collection: The Aristocats	August 18, 2015	Various	
Access All Areas: Disney Channel	October 1, 2015	Various	
We Love Disney	October 30, 2015	Various	Released by Verve Records United States Edition
The Good Dinosaur (Original Motion Picture Soundtrack)	November 20, 2015	Mychael Danna, Jeff Danna	
Star Wars: The Force Awakens – Original Motion Picture Soundtrack	December 18, 2015	John Williams	Academy Award nominee for Best Original Score
The Finest Hours (Original Motion Picture Soundtrack)	January 29, 2016	Carter Burwell	
Soy Luna - Modo Amar (Music from the TV Series)	February 26, 2016	Soy Luna - Cast	
Zootopia (Original Motion Picture Soundtrack)	March 4, 2016	Michael Giacchino	
We Love Disney	March 11, 2016	Áureo Baqueiro	Released by Universal Music México Latin America Edition
Everybody Loves Disney	March 30, 2016	Various	Digital release only
The Jungle Book (Original Motion Picture Soundtrack)	April 16, 2016	John Debney	
Your Favorite Songs from 100 Disney Channel Original Movies	May 20, 2016	Various	
Alice Through the Looking Glass: Original Motion Picture Soundtrack	May 27, 2016	Danny Elfman	
Finding Dory (Original Motion Picture Soundtrack)	June 17, 2016	Thomas Newman	
The BFG (Original Motion Picture Soundtrack)	July 1, 2016	John Williams	
Piper (From "Piper") - Single	July 29, 2016	Adrian Belew	
Bouncy Ball (From "High School Musical: A Big Lip Reading") - Single	August 5, 2016	Bad Lip Reading	
Don't Stare at the Sun (From "High School Musical: A Big Lip Reading") - Single	August 5, 2016	Bad Lip Reading	
Pete's Dragon (Original Motion Picture Soundtrack)	August 12, 2016	Daniel Hart	
Soy Luna: Música en ti	August 26, 2016	Soy Luna - Cast	
Queen of Katwe (Original Motion Picture Soundtrack)	September 23, 2016	Alex Heffes	
Metal Disney	October 5, 2016	D-Metal Stars	
Moana: Original Motion Picture Soundtrack	November 18, 2016	Various; Mark Mancina; Lin-Manuel Miranda; Opetaia Foaʻi; Tom MacDougall	Academy Award nominee for Best Original Song
Christmas Now (Disney Channel Kerst Song) - Single	December 7, 2016	Femke Meines, Sander Hanna, Shalisa van der Laan & Ridder	
Jazz Loves Disney	December 9, 2016	Various	Released in Collaboration with Verve
Rogue One: A Star Wars Story (Original Motion Picture Soundtrack)	December 16, 2016	Michael Giacchino	
Elena of Avalor: Original Soundtrack	February 10, 2017	Various	
Freaky Friday: Original Cast Recording	February 10, 2017	Various	
La vida es un sueño (Música de la serie de Disney Channel)	March 3, 2017	Soy Luna - Cast	
Beauty and the Beast: Original Motion Picture Soundtrack	March 10, 2017	Alan Menken	
Everything Everything (From "Disneynature: Born in China") - Single	April 7, 2017	American Authors	
Disneynature: Born in China (Original motion Picture Soundtrack)	April 21, 2017	Barnaby Taylor	
Happily Ever After (Full Version) [Single]	May 12, 2017	Jordan Fisher & Angie Keilhauer	An extended version of the soundtrack played at the Magic Kingdom nighttime fireworks display.
Pirates of the Caribbean: Dead Men Tell No Tales—Original Motion Picture Soundtrack	May 26, 2017	Geoff Zanelli	
Cars 3 (Original Motion Picture Soundtrack)	May 28, 2017	Various; Randy Newman	
The Music from Rivers of Light & Tree of Life Awakenings Shows at Disney’s Animal Kingdom Theme Park	June 2, 2017	Various	
Cars 3 (Original Score)	June 16, 2017	Randy Newman	
LOU (Original Score) - Single	June 16, 2017	Christophe Beck	
Descendants 2 (Original TV Movie Soundtrack)	July 21, 2017	Various	
The Legacy Collection: Robin Hood	August 4, 2017	Various	
TE VAKA: Greatest Hits: Songs That Inspired Moana	August 18, 2017	Te Vaka	
Disney Junior Music: Doc McStuffins	September 1, 2017	Various	
Disney Junior Music: Elena of Avalor	September 1, 2017	Various	
Disney Junior Music: Mickey and the Roadster Racers	September 1, 2017	Various	
Disney Junior Music: Puppy Dog Pals	September 1, 2017	Various	
Disney Junior Music: The Lion Guard	September 1, 2017	Various	
Disney Junior Music: Nursery Rhymes, Volume 1	September 22, 2017	Rob Cantor & Genevieve Goings	
Soy Luna Remixes (AtellaGali Remixes) - EP	October 6, 2017	Soy Luna - Cast	
Bizaardvark (Music from the TV Series) - EP	October 7, 2017	Olivia Rodrigo & Madison Hu	
Tomorrow Starts Today (Andi Mack Theme Song) - Single	October 20, 2017	Sabrina Carpenter	
Disney Junior Music: Halloween Party	October 20, 2017	Various	
Olaf's Frozen Adventure (Original Soundtrack)	November 3, 2017	Various	
Coco (Original Motion Picture Soundtrack)	November 10, 2017	Various; Michael Giacchino	Academy Award winner for Best Original Song
Jazz Loves Disney 2	November 10, 2017	Various	Released in Collaboration with Verve
Disney Junior Music: Holiday Hits	December 1, 2017	Various	
Wonderful Christmastime - Single	December 8, 2017	Milo Manheim & Meg Donnelly	Theme from the 2017 TV special "Disney Parks Presents: A Disney Channel Holiday Celebration"
Castle Dance (From "Descendants: A Big Lip Reading") - Single	December 15, 2017	Bad Lip Reading	
Danny Elephant (From "Descendants: A Big Lip Reading") - Single	December 15, 2017	Bad Lip Reading	
Mommy Says (From "Descendants: A Big Lip Reading") - Single	December 15, 2017	Bad Lip Reading	
Star Wars: The Last Jedi – Original Motion Picture Soundtrack	December 15, 2017	John Williams	Academy Award nominee for Best Original Score
Tangled: The Series (Music from the TV Series)	January 19, 2018	Various	
Who Framed Roger Rabbit (Original Motion Picture Soundtrack)	January 23, 2018	Alan Silvestri	Reissue. Released in Collaboration with Intrada Records.
The Legacy Collection: Beauty and the Beast	February 9, 2018	Alan Menken	
Zombies (Original TV Movie Soundtrack)	February 16, 2018	Various	
Disney Junior Music: Muppet Babies	February 23, 2018	Various	
Disney Junior Music: Dance Party! The Album	March 9, 2018	Various	
A Wrinkle in Time: Original Motion Picture Soundtrack	March 9, 2018	Various	
Disney Princess: Live Your Story - Single	March 23, 2018	Tina Parol	
Soy Luna: Modo Amar (Music from the TV Series)	April 6, 2018	Soy Luna - Cast	
You've Got a Friend in Me (Single)	April 20, 2018	Jordan Fisher & Olivia Holt	Single created for the "Pixarfest" celebration at Disneyland.
Disney Super Guitar	April 25, 2018	Disney Super Guitar	
Immortals - Single	April 27, 2018	DCappella	
Star Wars (Original Motion Picture Soundtrack)	May 4, 2018	John Williams	Reissue
Star Wars: The Empire Strikes Back (Original Motion Picture Soundtrack)	May 4, 2018	John Williams	Reissue
Star Wars: Return of the Jedi (Original Motion Picture Soundtrack)	May 4, 2018	John Williams	Reissue
Star Wars Episode I: The Phantom Menace – Original Motion Picture Soundtrack	May 4, 2018	John Williams	Reissue
Star Wars Episode II: Attack of the Clones (Original Motion Picture Soundtrack)	May 4, 2018	John Williams	Reissue
Star Wars Episode III: Revenge of the Sith – Original Motion Picture Soundtrack	May 4, 2018	John Williams	Reissue
Solo: A Star Wars Story (Original Motion Picture Soundtrack)	May 25, 2018	John Powell, John Williams	
Disney Junior Music: Fancy Nancy	June 8, 2018	Various	
Incredibles 2 (Original Motion Picture Soundtrack)	June 15, 2018	Michael Giacchino	
Disney Junior Music: Nursery Rhymes, Volume 2	July 13, 2018	Rob Cantor & Genevieve Goings	
Christopher Robin (Original Motion Picture Soundtrack)	August 3, 2018	Geoff Zanelli, Jon Brion	
Disney Junior Music: Vampirina - Ghoul Girls Rock!	August 3, 2018	Various	
Disney Junior Music: Nursery Rhymes, Volume 3	August 10, 2018	Rob Cantor & Genevieve Goings	
Freaky Friday (Music from the Disney Channel Original Movie)	August 10, 2018	Various	
How Far I'll Go - Single	August 10, 2018	DCappella	
Disney Junior Music: Nursery Rhymes, Volume 4	September 21, 2018	Rob Cantor & Genevieve Goings	
Disney Peaceful Piano: Calm	September 21, 2018	Disney Peaceful Piano	
Disney Peaceful Piano: Happy	September 21, 2018	Disney Peaceful Piano	
All I Want for Christmas Is You - Single	September 28, 2018	DCappella	
Disney Junior Music: Super Spooky Halloween (From "Muppet Babies") [Single]	September 28, 2018	Various	
Last Christmas - Single	September 28, 2018	DCappella	
Trashin' the Camp - Single	September 28, 2018	DCappella	
Raven's Home: The Musical Episode (Remix) [Music from the TV Series]	October 7, 2018	Various	
Happy Haul-O-Ween from Cars Land: Spooky Songs from Mater and Luigi	October 12, 2018	Larry the Cable Guy & Tony Shalhoub	
Disney Junior Music: Holiday Classics	November 2, 2018	Rob Cantor & Genevieve Goings	
The Nutcracker and the Four Realms (Original Motion Picture Soundtrack)	November 2, 2018	James Newton Howard	
Disney Junior Music: Holiday Hits, Volume 2	November 9, 2018	Various	
Steamboat Willie (Original Motion Picture Soundtrack) - EP	November 9, 2018	Walt Disney	
Disney Peaceful Piano: Chill	November 16, 2018	Disney Peaceful Piano	
Disney Peaceful Piano: Lullaby	November 16, 2018	Disney Peaceful Piano	
DCappella	November 16, 2018	DCappella	
Ralph Breaks the Internet (Original Motion Picture Soundtrack)	November 21, 2018	Henry Jackman	
Mele Kalikimaka - Single	November 23, 2018	Meg Donnelly	
Mary Poppins Returns: Original Motion Picture Soundtrack	December 7, 2018	Marc Shaiman	Academy Award nominee for Best Original Score Academy Award nominee for Best Original Song
Ruby Rock - Single	December 14, 2018	Ruby Rose Turner	
Music from Pandora—The World of Avatar	January 4, 2019	James Horner, Simon Franglen	
Call Me, Beep Me! (From "Kim Possible") - Single	January 11, 2019	Sadie Stanley	
Disney Peaceful Piano: Motivation	January 18, 2019	Disney Peaceful Piano	
Disney Junior Music: Nursery Rhymes, Volume 5	January 25, 2019	Rob Cantor & Genevieve Goings	
Kim Possible: Original Soundtrack	February 15, 2019	Sadie Stanley	
Naked Mole Rap Remix (From "Kim Possible") - Single	February 15, 2019	Sean Giambrone & Issac Ryan Brown	
Part of Your World - Single	February 15, 2019	DCappella	
Dumbo (Original Motion Picture Soundtrack)	March 29, 2019	Danny Elfman	
The Mirror - Single	April 5, 2019	Ruby Rose Turner	
Disneynature Soundscapes: African Cats	April 12, 2019	Disneynature Soundscapes	
Disneynature Soundscapes: Bears	April 12, 2019	Disneynature Soundscapes	
Disneynature Soundscapes: Born in China	April 12, 2019	Disneynature Soundscapes	
Disneynature Soundscapes: Monkey Kingdom	April 12, 2019	Disneynature Soundscapes	
Disneynature Soundscapes: Oceans	April 12, 2019	Disneynature Soundscapes	
Disneynature Soundscapes: Penguins	April 12, 2019	Disneynature Soundscapes	
Rapunzel's Tangled Adventure (Music from the TV Series)	April 12, 2019	Various	
Disneynature: Penguins (Original Motion Picture Soundtrack)	April 17, 2019	Harry Gregson-Williams	
Disneynature Soundscapes: Chimpanzee	April 19, 2019	Disneynature Soundscapes	
That's What I'm Talkin' Bout - Single	April 19, 2019	Kylie Cantrall	
Disneynature Soundscapes: Dolphins	May 10, 2019	Disneynature Soundscapes	
Aladdin (Original Motion Picture Soundtrack)	May 22, 2019	Alan Menken	
Disney Junior Music: T.O.T.S. (Volume 1)	June 14, 2019	Various	
Toy Story 4 (Original Motion Picture Soundtrack)	June 21, 2019	Randy Newman	Academy Award nominee for Best Original Song
Smoky Flow (From "Raven's Home") - Single	July 5, 2019	Issac Ryan Brown, Navia Robinson & Sky Katz	
The Lion King: Original Motion Picture Soundtrack	July 19, 2019	Hans Zimmer	
Disney Junior Music: Lullabies, Volume 1	July 26, 2019	Rob Cantor	
Descendants 3: Original TV Movie Soundtrack	August 2, 2019	Various	
Ready for This (feat. JD McCrary) - Single	August 2, 2019	DCappella	
Feeling Some Kind of Way - Single	September 6, 2019	Kylie Cantrall	
Speechless - Single	September 6, 2019	DCappella	
Disney Junior Music: Lullabies, Volume 2	September 20, 2019	Rob Cantor	
I Do My Thing (From "Gabby Duran & The Unsittables") - Single	September 20, 2019	Kylie Cantrall	
Disney Junior Music: Vampirina - Ghoul Girls Rock! Volume 2	September 27, 2019	Various	
Calling All the Monsters - Single	October 4, 2019	Kylie Cantrall	Cover of China Anne McClain's "Calling All the Monsters"
Circle of Life / He Lives In You - Single	October 11, 2019	DCappella	
Disney Junior Music: Vampirina HalloVeen Party	October 11, 2019	Various	
Maleficent Mistress of Evil (Original Motion Picture Soundtrack)	October 18, 2019	Geoff Zanelli	
Look What You Made Me Do - Single	October 25, 2019	Meg Donnelly	From the 2019 Disney Channel TV special "Disney Hall of Villains"
Problem (The Monster Remix) - Single	October 25, 2019	Issac Ryan Brown	From the 2019 Disney Channel TV special "Disney Hall of Villains"
Queen of Mean (From "Descendants 3") [CLOUDxCITY Remix] - Single	October 25, 2019	Sarah Jeffery	From the 2019 Disney Channel TV special "Disney Hall of Villains"
Sucker - Single	October 25, 2019	Kylie Cantrall	From the 2019 Disney Channel TV special "Disney Hall of Villains"
Rockin' Holiday	October 25, 2019	DCappella	
Disney Junior Music: Holiday Party! The Album	November 1, 2019	Various	
The Medley, The Mashup (From "High School Musical: The Musical: The Series") - Single	November 1, 2019	Cast of High School Musical: The Musical: The Series	
The Little Mermaid Live! (2019 ABC TV Version)	November 6, 2019	Alan Menken, Howard Ashman, Auli'i Cravalho, Shaggy, and Queen Latifah	
I See the Light - Single	November 8, 2019	DCappella	
Lady and the Tramp (Original Soundtrack)	November 12, 2019	Joseph Trapanese	
The Mandalorian: Chapter 1 (Original Score)	November 12, 2019	Ludwig Göransson	
Noelle (Original Motion Picture Soundtrack)	November 12, 2019	Clyde Lawrence, Cody Fitzgerald, Lawrence	
The Mandalorian: Chapter 2 (Original Score)	November 15, 2019	Ludwig Göransson	
Frozen 2 (Original Motion Picture Soundtrack)	November 22, 2019	Various; Christophe Beck	Academy Award nominee for Best Original Song
I Do My Thing (From "Gabby Duran & The Unsittables") [Remix] - Single	November 22, 2019	Kylie Cantrall	
The Mandalorian: Chapter 3 (Original Score)	November 22, 2019	Ludwig Göransson	
Queen of Mean/What's My Name (CLOUDxCITY Mashup) [From "Descendants"] - Single	November 22, 2019	Descendants	
Audrey's Christmas Rewind - Single	November 29, 2019	Sarah Jeffery & Jadah Marie	Pop song performed by Sarah Jeffery who reprises her role as Audrey and Jadah Marie who reprises her role as Celia Facilier from the Descendants franchise.
The Mandalorian: Chapter 4 (Original Score)	November 29, 2019	Ludwig Göransson	
Get'cha Head in the Game - Single	December 6, 2019	DCappella	
The Mandalorian: Chapter 5 (Original Score)	December 6, 2019	Ludwig Göransson	
The Mandalorian: Chapter 6 (Original Score)	December 13, 2019	Ludwig Göransson	
The Mandalorian: Chapter 7 (Original Score)	December 18, 2019	Ludwig Göransson	
Star Wars: The Rise of Skywalker — Original Motion Picture Soundtrack	December 18, 2019	John Williams	Academy Award nominee for Best Original Score
The Mandalorian: Chapter 8 (Original Score)	December 27, 2019	Ludwig Göransson	Primetime Emmy Award winner for Primetime Emmy Award for Outstanding Music Composition for a Series

=== 2020s ===
Title	U.S. release date	Artist	Notes
Disney Junior Music: The Rocketeer	January 10, 2020	Various	
Ev'rybody Wants to Be a Cat - Single	January 10, 2020	DCappella	
High School Musical: The Musical: The Series: The Soundtrack	January 10, 2020	Various	
I Just Can't Wait to Be King - Single	February 7, 2020	DCappella	
Fam Jam (From "Fam Jam") - Single	February 14, 2020	Meg Donnelly & Issac Ryan Brown	
Zombies 2 (Original TV Movie Soundtrack)	February 14, 2020	Various	
Disney Junior Music: Puppy Dog Pals - Pup-tastic Party, Vol. 2	February 21, 2020	Various	
Forky Asks a Question (Original Score)	February 28, 2020	Jake Monaco	
I'll Make a Man Out of You - Single	February 28, 2020	DCappella	
Lamp Life (Original Score)	February 28, 2020	Jake Monaco	
Disney Dreamin' with Matthew Morrison	March 6, 2020	Matthew Morrison	
Onward (Original Motion Picture Soundtrack)	March 6, 2020	Mychael Danna	
Loyal Brave True (From "Mulan") - Single	March 6, 2020	Christina Aguilera	
Rapunzel's Tangled Adventure: Plus Est En Vous (Music from the TV Series)	March 6, 2020	Various	
Stargirl: Original Soundtrack	March 13, 2020	Rob Simonsen	
Disney Junior Music: Mira, Royal Detective	March 20, 2020	Various	
No Reason - Single	March 20, 2020	Kylie Cantrall	
Disneynature: Dolphin Reef (Original Soundtrack)	March 27, 2020	Steven Price	
All I Want - Single	March 27, 2020	DCappella	
I Think I Kinda, You Know - Just for a Moment Mashup (From "High School Musical: The Musical: The Series") - Single	April 3, 2020	Olivia Rodrigo & Joshua Bassett	
Descendants Remix Dance Party	April 3, 2020	Various	
Disney Junior Music: T.O.T.S. (Volume 2)	April 10, 2020	Various	
I2I - Single	April 10, 2020	DCappella	
Disney Guitar: Lullaby	April 15, 2020	Disney Peaceful Guitar	
Flesh & Bone/Someday Mashup - Single	April 24, 2020	Milo Manheim, Meg Donnelly, Kylee Russell, Carla Jeffery, Chandler Kinney, Pearce Joza & Baby Ariel	This is a mashup of two songs from the ZOMBIES 2 (Original TV Movie Soundtrack)
Into the Unknown - Single	April 24, 2020	DCappella	
You're Welcome - Single	May 15, 2020	DCappella	
Disney Guitar: Love	May 29, 2020	Disney Peaceful Guitar	
Hawaiian Roller Coaster Ride - Single	June 10, 2020	DCappella	
Disney Guitar: Chill	June 12, 2020	Disney Peaceful Guitar	
We Own the Summer - Single	June 12, 2020	Milo Manheim	
Artemis Fowl (Original Soundtrack)	June 12, 2020	Patrick Doyle	
We Own the Summer (Single)	June 12, 2020	Milo Manheim	
Just Around the Riverbend / Colors of the Wind - Single	June 19, 2020	DCappella	
Disney Guitar: Calm	June 26, 2020	Disney Peaceful Guitar	
Out (Original Motion Picture Soundtrack)	July 3, 2020	Jake Monaco	
Disney Guitar: Motivation	July 10, 2020	Disney Peaceful Guitar	
Homeward Bound: The Incredible Journey (Original Soundtrack)	July 17, 2020	Bruce Broughton	Reissue of the original 1993 Intrada Records soundtrack.
Disney Guitar: Happy	July 24, 2020	Disney Peaceful Guitar	
A Place for Us - Single	July 31, 2020	Siena Agudong & Izabela Rose	
Disney Junior Music: Mickey Mornings	July 31, 2020	Felicia Barton & Mickey Mouse	
Disney Guitar: Breathe	August 7, 2020	Disney Peaceful Guitar	
Magic Camp: Original Soundtrack	August 14, 2020	Rolfe Kent	
Disney Peaceful Piano: Breathe	August 21, 2020	Disney Peaceful Piano	
The One and Only and Ivan: Original Motion Picture Soundtrack	August 21, 2020	Craig Armstrong	
Phineas and Ferb The Movie: Candace Against the Universe (Original Soundtrack)	August 28, 2020	Various	
Reflection (2020) [From "Mulan"] - Single	August 28, 2020	Christina Aguilera	
Go the Distance - Single	September 4, 2020	DCappella	
Disney Junior Music: Elena of Avalor - A Royal Celebration	September 4, 2020	Various	
Mulan (Original Motion Picture Soundtrack)	September 4, 2020	Harry Gregson-Williams	
Secret Society of Second-Born Royals: Original Soundtrack	September 25, 2020	Leo Birenberg	
The Nightmare Before Christmas Medley - Single	October 2, 2020	DCappella	
Disney Peaceful Piano: Holiday	October 9, 2020	Disney Peaceful Piano	
ZOMBIES: Addison's Moonstone Mystery - Single	October 16, 2020	Meg Donnelly & Cast of ZOMBIES: Addison's Moonstone Mystery	
Disney Junior Music: Mickey's Trick or Treats	October 23, 2020	Felicia Barton & Mickey Mouse	
Upside-Down Magic (Original Score)	October 23, 2020	Tom Howe	
Little Nightmares	October 20, 2020	Chantry Johnson	
Clouds - Single	November 6, 2020	DCappella	
The Wonderful World of Mickey Mouse - Single	November 13, 2020	Donald Duck, Mickey Mouse & Goofy	
High School Musical: The Musical: The Holiday Special: The Soundtrack	November 13, 2020	Various	
Almost There - Single	November 20, 2020	DCappella	
Put the Happy in the Holidays - Single	November 20, 2020	Issac Ryan Brown, Meg Donnelly, Sky Katz, Chandler Kinney, Ruth Righi, Navia Robinson & Trevor Tordjam	
Solo: A Star Wars Story (Original Motion Picture Soundtrack/Deluxe Edition)	November 20, 2020	John Powell, John Williams	Reissue as Deluxe Edition. Released by Walt Disney Records and 5 Cat Studios. Digital release only.
The Mandalorian: Season 2 - Vol. 1 (Chapters 9-12) (Original Score)	November 20, 2020	Ludwig Göransson	
Music from Zombies (Original Score)	November 20, 2020	George S. Clinton	
This Christmas - Single	November 27, 2020	DCappella	
Godmothered (Original Soundtrack)	December 4, 2020	Rachel Portman & Jullian Shea	
Puppy for Hanukkah (Single)	December 4, 2020	Daveed Diggs	
Reflection - Single	December 4, 2020	DCappella	
Disney Junior Music: Mickey's Holiday Party (Single)	December 18, 2020	Felicia Barton & Mickey Mouse	
Black Beauty (Original Soundtrack)	December 18, 2020	Guillaume Roussel	
The Mandalorian: Season 2 - Vol. 2 (Chapters 13-16) (Original Score)	December 18, 2020	Ludwig Göransson	
Soul: Original Motion Picture Soundtrack	December 18, 2020	Trent Reznor, Atticus Ross, Jon Batiste	Academy Award winner for Best Original Score
Disney Jazz Vol. II: Everybody Wants to Be a Cat	January 29, 2021	Various	
Kiss the Girl - Single	February 5, 2021	DCappella	
Flora & Ulysses (Original Soundtrack)	February 19, 2021	Jake Monaco	
Raya and the Last Dragon: Original Motion Picture Soundtrack	March 5, 2021	James Newton Howard	
Shiny - Single	March 5, 2021	DCappella	
Even When/The Best Part (From "High School Musical: The Musical: The Series" Season 2) - Single	April 30, 2021	Olivia Rodrigo & Joshua Bassett	
Disney Junior Music: The Chicken Squad Main Title Theme (From "The Chicken Squad") - Single	May 7, 2021	The Chicken Squad - Cast	
Disney Junior Music: The Chicken Squad	May 14, 2021	The Chicken Squad - Cast	
High School Musical 2 Medley (From "High School Musical: The Musical: The Series" Season 2) - Single	May 14, 2021	Cast of High School Musical: The Musical: The Series	
The Perfect Gift (From "High School Musical: The Musical: The Series Season 2") - Single	May 14, 2021	Joshua Bassett	
1-2-3 (From "High School Musical: The Musical: The Series" Season 2) - Single	May 21, 2021	Julia Lester, Dara Reneé & Sofia Wylie	
One with the Drum (From "Far Away from Raven's Home") - Single	May 21, 2021	Issac Ryan Brown, Navia Robinson, Jason Maybaum & Sky Katz	
Starting Now - Single	May 21, 2021	Brandy	Single promoting Disney's Ultimate Princess Celebration
Cruella: Original Motion Picture Soundtrack	May 28, 2021	Various	
Cruella: Original Score by Nicholas Britell	May 28, 2021	Nicholas Britell	
Even When (From "High School Musical: The Musical: The Series Season 2") - Single	May 28, 2021	Joshua Bassett	
The Best Part (From "High School Musical: The Musical: The Series Season 2") - Single	May 28, 2021	Olivia Rodrigo	
Red Means Love (From "High School Musical: The Musical: The Series" Season 2) - Single	May 28, 2021	Julia Lester & Larry Saperstein	
Granted (From "High School Musical: The Musical: The Series" Season 2) - Single	June 4, 2021	Olivia Rodrigo	
Marvel's Spidey and His Amazing Friends Theme (From "Disney Junior Music: Marvel's Spidey and His Amazing Friends") - Single	June 4, 2021	Patrick Stump & Disney Junior	
This Is Me - Single	June 4, 2021	DCappella	
A Dancer's Heart (From "High School Musical: The Musical: The Series" Season 2) - Single	June 11, 2021	Sofia Wylie	
The Climb (From "High School Musical: The Musical: The Series" Season 2) - Single	June 11, 2021	Joe Serafini	
Home (From "High School Musical: The Musical: The Series Season 2"/"Beauty and the Beast") - Single	June 18, 2021	Cast of High School Musical: The Musical: The Series	
Luca: Original Motion Picture Soundtrack	June 18, 2021	Dan Romer	
The Rose Song (From "High School Musical: The Musical: The Series" Season 2) - Single	June 18, 2021	Olivia Rodrigo	
Around You (From "High School Musical: The Musical: The Series" Season 2) - Single	June 25, 2021	Kate Reinders & Derek Hough	
The Mob Song (From "High School Musical: The Musical: The Series Season 2"/"Beauty and the Beast") - Single	June 25, 2021	Cast of High School Musical: The Musical: The Series	
Gaston (From "High School Musical: The Musical: The Series Season 2"/"Beauty and the Beast") - Single	July 2, 2021	Cast of High School Musical: The Musical: The Series	
If I Can't Love Her (From "High School Musical: The Musical: The Series Season 2"/"Beauty and the Beast") - Single	July 2, 2021	Roman Banks	
Jump Into Wow! (From "Disney Junior Music: Jump Into Wow!") - Single	July 2, 2021	Lamont Coleman, Paula Winger & Maria Christensen	
Disney Peaceful Piano: Self-Care Day	July 9, 2021	Disney Peaceful Piano	
Let You Go (From "High School Musical: The Musical: The Series" Season 2) - Single	July 9, 2021	Joshua Bassett	
Mickey Mouse Funhouse Main Title Theme (From "Disney Junior Music: Mickey Mouse Funhouse") - Single	July 9, 2021	Mickey Mouse Funhouse - Cast	
Disney Junior Music: Mickey Mouse Funhouse Vol. 1	July 16, 2021	Mickey Mouse Funhouse - Cast	
In a Heartbeat (From "High School Musical: The Musical: The Series Season 2") - Single	July 16, 2021	Frankie Rodriguez feat. Joshua Bassett	
Be Our Guest (From "High School Musical: The Musical: The Series Season 2"/"Beauty and the Beast") - Single	July 23, 2021	Cast of High School Musical: The Musical: The Series	
Disney Guitar: Blissful	July 23, 2021	Disney Peaceful Guitar	
Something There (From "High School Musical: The Musical: The Series Season 2"/"Beauty and the Beast") - Single	July 23, 2021	Cast of High School Musical: The Musical: The Series	
Disney Guitar: Dream	July 25, 2021	Disney Peaceful Guitar	
Chip 'n Dale: Park Life (Original Soundtrack)	July 30, 2021	Vincent Artaud	
Music from The Wonderful World of Mickey Mouse - EP	July 30, 2021	Various	
High School Musical: The Musical: The Series: The Soundtrack: Season 2	July 30, 2021	Various	
Jungle Cruise (Original Motion Picture Soundtrack)	July 30, 2021	James Newton Howard	
Mickey's Friendship Mashup - Single	July 30, 2021	DCappella	
Mickey Mouse Clubhouse/Funhouse Theme Song Mashup (From "Disney Junior Music: Mickey Mouse Clubhouse/Mickey Mouse Funhouse") - Single	July 30, 2021	They Might Be Giants, Beau Black, Alex Cartañá, Loren Hoskins & Mickey Mouse	
Disney Peaceful Piano: Break Time	August 6, 2021	Disney Peaceful Piano	
Time to Spidey Save the Day (From "Disney Junior Music: Marvel's Spidey and His Amazing Friends") - Single	August 6, 2021	Patrick Stump & Disney Junior	
Into the Unknown (Disney Princess Remixed) - Single	August 13, 2021	Dara Reneé & Frankie Rodriguez	
Spin (Original Soundtrack)	August 13, 2021	Various	
Disney Guitar: Joy	August 20, 2021	Disney Peaceful Guitar	
Starting Now Mashup - Single	August 20, 2021	DCappella	
Almost There (Disney Princess Remixed) - Single	August 27, 2021	Dara Reneé, Ruth Righi & Izabela Rose	
Home (Disney Princess Remixed) - Single	August 27, 2021	Julia Lester	
Cantina Band - Single	August 30, 2021	DCappella	
Disney Peaceful Piano: Dream	September 3, 2021	Disney Peaceful Piano	
Deck the Halls - Single	September 10, 2021	DCappella	
Disney Guitar: Break Time	September 17, 2021	Disney Peaceful Guitar	
The Legacy Collection: The Hunchback of Notre Dame	September 22, 2021	Alan Menken, Various	
Descendants Medley - Single	September 24, 2021	DCappella	
Disney Princess Piano	September 24, 2021	Disney Peaceful Piano	
Holiday A Cappella Songs	September 24, 2021	DCappella	
Disney's Broadway Is Back (Medley) - Single	October 1, 2021	DCappella	
Disney Peaceful Piano: Tranquility	October 1, 2021	Disney Peaceful Piano	
Disney Guitar: The Molly Miller Sessions - Single	October 2, 2021	Disney Peaceful Piano	
Disney Guitar: Self-Care Day	October 15, 2021	Disney Peaceful Guitar	
Ron's Gone Wrong (Original Motion Picture Soundtrack)	October 15, 2021	Henry Jackman	Joint co-distribution with Hollywood Records
Come Little Children - Single	October 22, 2021	DCappella	
Shrimpy in the House (From "ZOMBIES: Addison's Monster Mystery") - Single	October 22, 2021	ZOMBIES - Cast	
Disney Peaceful Piano: Balance	October 29, 2021	Disney Peaceful Piano	
Ciao Alberto (Original Motion Picture Soundtrack)	October 29, 2021	Dan Romer	
Harmonious: Globally Inspired Music from the EPCOT Nighttime Spectacular	October 29, 2021	Mark Hammond, Yaron Spiwak & Matt Walker	
Feeling the Love/Did I Mention Mashup (From "Descendants") - Single	November 5, 2021	Cast of Descendants	
Disney Guitar: The John Connearn Sessions - Single	November 12, 2021	Disney Peaceful Piano	
Encanto: Original Motion Picture Soundtrack	November 24, 2021	Various	Academy Award nominee for Best Original Song and Best Original Score
Disney Peaceful Piano: Serenity	November 26, 2021	Disney Peaceful Piano	
Christmas...Again?! (Original Soundtrack)	December 3, 2021	Various	
EPCOT Medley - Single	December 3, 2021	DCappella	
Disney Guitar: Tranquility	December 10, 2021	Disney Peaceful Guitar	
Diary of a Wimpy Kid: Original Soundtrack	December 17, 2021	John Paesano	Joint co-distribution with Hollywood Records
Disney Peaceful Piano: Blissful	December 24, 2021	Disney Peaceful Piano	
Surface Pressure - Single	December 24, 2021	DCappella	
Prince Ali - Single	January 5, 2022	DCappella	
Disney Guitar: Serenity	January 7, 2022	Disney Peaceful Guitar	
Alice's Wonderland Bakery Main Title Theme (From "Disney Junior Music: Alice's Wonderland Bakery") - Single	January 21, 2022	Alice's Wonderland Bakery - Cast & Disney Junior	
The Ice Age Adventures of Buck Wild: Original Motion Picture Soundtrack	January 28, 2022	Batu Sener	Joint co-distribution with Hollywood Records
Disney Junior Music: Rise Up, Sing Out	February 4, 2022	Rise Up, Sing Out - Cast & Disney Junior	
Disney Junior Music: Alice's Wonderland Bakery	February 11, 2022	Alice's Wonderland Bakery - Cast & Disney Junior	
Love Is An Open Door - Single	February 11, 2022	DCappella	
The Proud Family: Louder and Prouder Opening Theme (From "The Proud Family: Louder and Prouder") - Single	February 23, 2022	Joyce Wrice	
Change Me (From "The Proud Family: Louder and Prouder") - Single	February 25, 2022	MIYACHI	
Hands Up Cash Out (From "The Proud Family: Louder and Prouder") [A Capella Version] - Single	February 25, 2022	Raquel Lee Bolleau	
Disney Guitar: Family - Single	March 7, 2022	Disney Peaceful Guitar	
Disney Guitar: Spirit - Single	March 7, 2022	Disney Peaceful Guitar	
Turning Red (Original Motion Picture Soundtrack)	March 11, 2022	Ludwig Göransson	
Cheaper by the Dozen (Original Soundtrack)	March 18, 2022	John Paesano	Joint co-distribution with Hollywood Records
Cuter Than You (From "The Proud Family: Louder and Prouder") - Single	March 18, 2022	Tone-Loc	
Disney Guitar: Magical - Single	March 18, 2022	Disney Peaceful Guitar	
Lofi Minnie: Focus	March 18, 2022	Various	
Proud to Be (From "The Proud Family: Louder and Prouder") - Single	March 18, 2022	Various	
Gas Station Nachos (From "The Proud Family: Louder and Prouder") - Single	March 25, 2022	Cedric the Entertainer	
Disney Guitar: Peace - Single	April 1, 2022	Disney Peaceful Guitar	
Better Nate Than Ever (Original Soundtrack)	April 1, 2022	Gabriel Mann	
I Sold Out, I'm Not a Sellout (From "The Proud Family: Louder and Prouder") - Single	April 1, 2022	Lamorne Morris	
Disneynature: Polar Bear (Original Soundtrack)	April 22, 2022	Harry Gregson-Williams	
Disney Ukulele: Happy - EP	April 22, 2022	Disney Ukulele	
Shabooya Roll Call (From "The Proud Family: Louder and Prouder") - Single	April 22, 2022	Various	
Disney Ukulele: Love - EP	April 29, 2022	Disney Ukulele	
Eureka! Main Title Theme (From "Disney Junior Music: Eureka!") - Single	April 29, 2022	Eureka! - Cast & Disney Junior	
Kicks (From "Sneakerella") - Single	April 29, 2022	Chosen Jacobs	
Magic Reimagined	April 29, 2022	DCappella	
Disney Ukulele: Soothing - EP	May 6, 2022	Disney Ukulele	
Disney Ukulele: Lullaby - EP	May 13, 2022	Disney Ukulele	
Sneakerella (Original Soundtrack)	May 13, 2022	Elvis Ross	
Chip 'n Dale: Rescue Rangers (Original Soundtrack)	May 20, 2022	Various	
Firebuds Let's Roll (Firebuds Theme) [From "Disney Junior Music: Firebuds"] - Single	May 27, 2022	Firebuds - Cast & Disney Junior	
Hollywood Stargirl (Original Soundtrack)	June 3, 2022	Hollywood Stargirl - Cast, Michael Penn & Robsimonsen	
Mission Perpetual (From "Lightyear") - Single	June 3, 2022	Michael Giacchino	
Lightyear (Original Motion Picture Soundtrack)	June 17, 2022	Michael Giacchino	
Rise (Original Soundtrack)	June 24, 2022	Ré Olunuga	
The Proud Family: Louder and Prouder (Music from the Series)	June 30, 2022	Various	
It's On (From "High School Musical: The Musical: The Series (Season 3)/Camp Rock 2: The Final Jam) - Single	July 8, 2022	Cast of High School Musical: The Musical: The Series	
Glow Webs Glow (From "Disney Junior Music: Marvel's Spidey and His Amazing Friends") - Single	July 15, 2022	Patrick Stump & Disney Junior	
Zombies 3 (Original Soundtrack)	July 15, 2022	Various	
High School Musical: The Musical: The Series Season 3 (Episode 1) [From "High School Musical: The Musical: The Series Season 3"] - Single	July 26, 2022	Cast of High School Musical: The Musical: The Series	
Baymax! (Original Soundtrack)	July 29, 2022	Dominic Lewis	
Busy Puppy (From "Disney Junior Music: Mickey Mouse Funhouse") - Single	July 29, 2022	Mickey Mouse Funhouse - Cast & Disney Junior	
Happy Booty Dance (From "Disney Junior Music: Puppy Dog Pals") - Single	August 5, 2022	Puppy Dog Pals - Cast & Disney Junior	
High School Musical: The Musical: The Series Season 3 (Episode 3) [From High School Musical: The Musical: The Series (Season 3)"] - Single	August 10, 2022	Cast of High School Musical: The Musical: The Series	
What Is This Feeling (From "ZOMBIES 3") - Single	August 12, 2022	Various	
High School Musical: The Musical: The Series Season 3 (Episode 4) [From High School Musical: The Musical: The Series (Season 3)"] - Single	August 17, 2022	Cast of High School Musical: The Musical: The Series	
Disney Junior Music: Mickey Mouse Funhouse Pirate Adventure - Single	August 19, 2022	Mickey Mouse Funhouse - Cast & Disney Junior	
High School Musical: The Musical: The Series Season 3 (Episode 5) [From High School Musical: The Musical: The Series (Season 3)"] - Single	August 24, 2022	Cast of High School Musical: The Musical: The Series	
High School Musical: The Musical: The Series Season 3 (Episode 6) [From High School Musical: The Musical: The Series (Season 3)"] - Single	August 31, 2022	Cast of High School Musical: The Musical: The Series	
Cars on the Road (Original Soundtrack)	September 5, 2022	Jake Monaco	
Pinocchio (Original Soundtrack)	September 8, 2022	Alan Silvestri	
Can You Picture That? (From "The Muppets Mayhem") - Single	September 9, 2022	Dr. Teeth and the Electric Mayhem	
Go the Distance (Reimagine Tomorrow Versions) - EP	September 9, 2022	Gabby Samone, OTNES, Danni Cassette, Alan Eugene & Brittney Mendoza	
Home for the Holidays with DCappella	September 15, 2022	DCappella	
High School Musical: The Musical: The Series: The Soundtrack: Season 3	September 15, 2022	Various	
Disney Junior Music: Firebuds - EP	September 16, 2022	Firebuds - Cast & Disney Junior	
Home for the Holidays with DCappella - EP	September 16, 2022	DCappella	
The Legacy Collection: Aladdin	September 16, 2022	Alan Menken, Howard Ashman, Tim Rice	
My Kind of Monster (From "Under Wraps 2") - Single	September 23, 2022	Malachi Barton, Christian J Simon, Sophia Hammons & Under Wraps 2 - Cast	
Hocus Pocus 2 (Original Soundtrack)	September 30, 2022	John Debney	
Disney Junior Live On Tour: Costume Palooza (From "Disney Junior Live On Tour: Costume Palooza") - Single	October 21, 2022	Disney Junior	
A Little More	November 2, 2022	Jessica Darrow	Part of Disney's "From Our Family To Yours" Christmas campaign, supporting the Make-A-Wish Foundation
We Don't Care (From "The Villains of Valley View") - Single	November 4, 2022	Isabella Pappas & Kayden Muller-Janssen	
Moon Girl Magic (From "Marvel's Moon Girl and Devil Dinosaur") - Single	November 14, 2022	Diamond White	
Love Power (End Credits Version) [From "Disenchanted"] - Single	November 17, 2022	Idina Menzel	
Disenchanted (Original Soundtrack)	November 18, 2022	Alan Menken	
Zootopia+ (Original Soundtrack)	November 18, 2022	Various	
Strange World (Original Motion Picture Soundtrack)	November 23, 2022	Various	
Disney Junior Music: Alice's Wonderland Bakery - The Royal Christmas Rule - Single	November 25, 2022	Alice's Wonderland Bakery - Cast	
Gravity Falls Soundtrack	November 25, 2022	Brad Breeck	
Hanukkah Is Here (From "Disney Junior Music: Firebuds") - Single	November 25, 2022	Firebuds - Cast	
Mickey Saves Christmas (Original Soundtrack) - EP	November 25, 2022	Mickey Saves Christmas - Cast	
Diary of a Wilmpy Kid: Rodrick Rules	December 2, 2022	Various	
Disney Peaceful Strings: Relax	December 2, 2022	Disney Peaceful Strings	
Disney Junior Music: Magical Holidays 2022 - Single	December 9, 2022	Disney Junior	
Night at the Museum: Kahmunrah Rises Again (Original Soundtrack)	December 9, 2022	John Paesano	
Beauty and the Beast: A 30th Celebration (Original Soundtrack)	December 15, 2022	Beauty and the Beast: A 30th Celebration - Cast	
Disney Peaceful Strings: Classics	December 23, 2022	Disney Peaceful Strings	
The Low Tone Club	December 23, 2022	Carlos Vives	
Nobody Like U (feat. Jordan Fisher, Grayson Villanueva & Topher Ngo) - Single	January 2, 2023	DCappella	
Disney Peaceful Strings: Romance	January 6, 2023	Disney Peaceful Strings	
Lofi Minnie: Chill	January 20, 2023	Various	
Disney Junior Music: SuperKitties - EP	February 3, 2023	SuperKitties - Cast & Disney Junior	
Disney Junior Music: Marvel's Spidey and His Amazing Friends - Glow Webs Glow - Single	February 10, 2023	Marvel's Spidey and His Amazing Friends - Cast, Patrick Stump & Disney Junior	
Disney Junior Music: Me & Mickey - Single	February 24, 2023	Mickey Mouse & Disney Junior	
Disney 100	March 8, 2023	Various	Commemorative compilation album
Chang Can Dunk (Original Soundtrack)	March 10, 2023	Nathan Matthew David	
Finding Michael (Original Soundtrack)	March 17, 2023	Nick Harvey	
Marvel's Moon Girl and Devil Dinosaur (Original Soundtrack)	March 17, 2023	Raphael Saadiq, Diamond White & Marvel's Moon Girl and Devil Dinosaur - Cast	
Rainbow Connection (feat. Kermit the Frog) - Single	March 17, 2023	DCappella	
Ain't No Other Day (From "Saturdays") - Single	March 24, 2023	Rae Khalil	
Music from Mickey's Toontown	March 24, 2023	The Toontown Tooners	Soundtrack to Disneyland's renovated Mickey's Toontown
Love Is a Battlefield (From "Prom Pact") - Single	March 31, 2023	Peyton Elizabeth Lee & Milo Manheim	Cover of Pat Benatar's Love Is a Battlefield
Rock On (From "The Muppets Mayhem") - Single	April 21, 2023	Dr. Teeth and the Electric Mayhem	
Part of Your World (From "The Little Mermaid") - Single	April 26, 2023	Halle	
Peter Pan & Wendy (Original Score)	April 28, 2023	Daniel Hart	
Young Jedi Adventures Main Title (From "Disney Junior Music: Star Wars - Young Jedi Adventures") - Single	May 4, 2023	Matthew Margeson	
The Muppets Mayhem (Music from the Disney+ Original Series)	May 10, 2023	Dr. Teeth and the Electric Mayhem	
Crater (Original Soundtrack)	May 12, 2023	Dan Romer & Osei Essed	
The Future's in My Hands (Theme from "Hailey's On It!") - Single	May 12, 2023	Auli'i Cravalho	
When You Wish Upon a Star (From "Disney 100") - Single	May 15, 2023	Sara Bareilles	
The Little Mermaid (2023 Original Motion Picture Soundtrack)	May 19, 2023	Alan Menken, Howard Ashman, & Lin-Manuel Miranda	
The Little Mermaid (2023 Original Motion Picture Soundtrack) [Deluxe Edition]	May 26, 2023	Alan Menken, Howard Ashman, & Lin-Manuel Miranda	
Steal the Show (From "Elemental") - Single	June 2, 2023	Lauv	
Hailey's On It! (Original Soundtrack)	June 9, 2023	Auli'i Cravalho & Wade O. Brown	
This Is Where the Party's At (From "The Villains of Valley View: Season 2") - Single	June 9, 2023	Isabella Pappas & Kayden Muller-Janssen	
Disney Junior Music: Pupstruction	June 14, 2023	Pupstruction - Cast	
Elemental (Original Motion Picture Soundtrack)	June 16, 2023	Thomas Newman	
Disney Junior Music: Minnie's Bow-Toons: Camp Minnie - EP	June 21, 2023	Minnie Mouse, Minnie's Bow-Toons - Cast & Disney Junior	
World's Best (Original Soundtrack)	June 23, 2023	Various	
Kiff (Original Soundtrack)	June 30, 2023	Kiff - Cast	
Be a Firebud (From "Disney Junior Music: Firebuds") - Single	July 21, 2023	Firebuds - Cast & Disney Junior	
Mickey Mouse (Music from the Disney Mickey Mouse Shorts)	July 21, 2023	Mickey Mouse & Minnie Mouse	
Haunted Mansion (Original Motion Picture Soundtrack)	July 28, 2023	Kris Bowers	
I'm Not a Girl, Not Yet a Woman (From "The Slumber Party") - Single	July 28, 2023	The Slumber Party - Cast	A cover of "I'm Not a Girl, Not Yet a Woman"originally performed by Britney Spears
The Wonderful World of Mickey Mouse: Season 2 (Original Soundtrack)	July 28, 2023	The Wonderful World of Mickey Mouse - Cast, Mickey Mouse & Minnie Mouse	
Disney Junior Music: Marvel's Spidey and His Amazing Friends - Web-Spinners - Single	August 1, 2023	Marvel's Spidey and His Amazing Friends - Cast & Disney Junior	
Disney Junior Music: SuperKitties Su-purr Edition	August 8, 2023	SuperKitties - Cast & Disney Junior	
Indiana Jones and the Dial of Destiny (Original Motion Picture Soundtrack)	August 9, 2023	John Williams	Academy Award nominee for Best Original Score
Dino Sitting (From "Disney Junior Music: Mickey Mouse Funhouse Dino Safari") - Single	August 11, 2023	Mickey Mouse Funhouse - Cast & Disney Junior	
Everyone C'mon and Play (From "Disney Junior Music: Disney Junior and Friends Playdate) - Single	August 18, 2023	Disney Junior	
Disney Junior: Doc McStuffins - The Doc and Bella Are In! - Single	September 1, 2023	Doc McStuffins - Cast & Disney Junior	
High School Musical: The Musical: The Series: The Soundtrack: The Final Season	September 1, 2023	Cast of High School Musical: The Musical: The Series	
Halloweentown (Original Soundtrack)	September 1, 2023	Mark Mothersbaugh	
I Am Groot: Season 2 - Single	September 6, 2023	Daniele Luppi	
Lofi Pixar: Elemental - Single (EP)	September 15, 2023	Lofi Pixar & Disney Lofi	
A Place for Everyone (From "The Villains of Valley View: Season 2") - Single	September 29, 2023	The Villains of Valley View - Cast	
Beautiful, FL (From "Disney Launchpad: Season Two") [Original Soundtrack]	September 29, 2023	Rene G. Boscio	
Black Belts (From "Disney Launchpad: Season Two") [Original Soundtrack]	September 29, 2023	Ambrose Akinmusire	
Disney Junior Music: Halloween Jams - EP	September 29, 2023	Disney Junior	Features tracks from SuperKitties, Pupstruction, and Spidey and His Amazing Friends.
Maxine (From "Disney Launchpad: Season Two") [Original Soundtrack]	September 29, 2023	Carla Patullo	
Project CC (From "Disney Launchpad: Season Two") [Original Soundtrack]	September 29, 2023	EmmiLei Sankofa	
The Ghost (From "Disney Launchpad: Season Two") [Original Soundtrack]	September 29, 2023	Jessica Rae Huber	
The Roof (From "Disney Launchpad: Season Two") [Original Soundtrack]	September 29, 2023	Mato Wayuhi	
Mickey and Friends Trick or Treats (Original Soundtrack)	September 29, 2023	Mickey and Friends Trick or Treats - Cast & Mickey Mouse	
Dashing Through the Snow (Original Soundtrack)	November 17, 2023	Christopher Lennertz	
Wish (Original Motion Picture Soundtrack)	November 22, 2023	David Metzger	
Pixar Place Hotel	January 26, 2024	Various	
Marvel's Moon Girl and Devil Dinosaur: Season 2 (Original Soundtrack)	February 2, 2024	Various	
Raiders of the Lost Ark (Original Motion Picture Soundtrack)	March 27, 2024	John Williams	Reissue
Indiana Jones and the Temple of Doom (Original Motion Picture Soundtrack)	March 27, 2024	John Williams	Reissue
Indiana Jones and the Last Crusade (Original Motion Picture Soundtrack)	March 27, 2024	John Williams	Reissue
Indiana Jones and the Kingdom of the Crystal Skull (Original Motion Picture Soundtrack)	March 27, 2024	John Williams	Reissue
Madu (Original Soundtrack)	March 29, 2024	Jackson Greenberg	
Disneynature: Tiger (Original Soundtrack)	April 22, 2024	Nitin Sawhney	
Luminous: The Symphony of Us (Music from the EPCOT Nighttime Spectacular)	April 29, 2024	Various	
Honey, I Shrunk The Kids (Expanded Original Motion Picture Soundtrack)	April 30, 2024	James Horner	Released in Collaboration with Intrada Records. Originally released in 1999 as a three movie soundtrack and Original Score for Honey, I Shrunk The Kids in 2009.
Jim Henson: Idea Man (Original Soundtrack)	May 31, 2024	David Fleming	
Young Woman and the Sea (Original Score)	May 31, 2024	Amelia Warner	
Big City Greens the Movie: Spacecation (Original Soundtrack)	June 7, 2024	Various	
Inside Out 2 (Original Motion Picture Soundtrack)	June 14, 2024	Various	
Music from Tiana's Bayou Adventure	June 28, 2024	Various	
Zombies The Re-Animated Series (Original Soundtrack)	June 28, 2024	Various	
Descendants: The Rise of Red (Original TV Movie Soundtrack)	July 12, 2024	Various	
Country Bear Musical Jamboree (Original Soundtrack)	July 17, 2024	Various	
A Whole New Sound	September 6, 2024	Various	
Alice and the Queen of Hearts: Back to Wonderland	October 11, 2024	Cast - Disneyland Paris	
Disney 2000s: Lofi	October 11, 2024	Various	
Lofi: Gravity Falls	October 29, 2024	Brad Breeck	
Moana 2: (Original Motion Picture Soundtrack)	November 27, 2024	Various	
Mufasa: The Lion King (Original Motion Picture Soundtrack)	December 20, 2024	Lin-Manuel Miranda	
Marvel's Moon Girl and Devil Dinosaur: Season 2 - Vol. 2 (Original Soundtrack)	February 21, 2025	Various	
Alexander and the Terrible, Horrible, No Good, Very Bad Road Trip (Original Soundtrack)	March 14, 2025	Camilo Lara	
Disney's Snow White (Original Motion Picture Soundtrack)	March 14, 2025	Various	
Disneynature: Sea Lions of the Galapagos (Original Soundtrack)	April 22, 2025	Raphaelle Thibaut	
Lilo & Stitch (Original Motion Picture Soundtrack)	May 21, 2025	Dan Romer	
Elio (Original Motion Picture Soundtrack)	June 20, 2025	Rob Simonsen	
Tron: Ares (Original Motion Picture Soundtrack)	September 19, 2025	Nine Inch Nails	Under exclusive license to Interscope Records
A Very Jonas Christmas Movie	November 14, 2025	Siddhartha Khosla, Alan DeMoss	
Zootopia 2 (Original Motion Picture Soundtrack)	November 26, 2025	Michael Giacchino	
Diary of a Wimpy Kid: The Last Straw	December 5, 2025	John Paesano, Adam Hochstatter	
Tron Ares: Divergence	February 27, 2026	Nine Inch Nails	Under exclusive license to Interscope Records
Hoppers (Original Motion Picture Soundtrack)	March 6, 2026	Mark Mothersbaugh	
Toy Story 5 (Original Motion Picture Soundtrack)	June 19, 2026	Randy Newman	
Moana (Original Motion Picture Soundtrack)	July 10, 2026	Mark Mancina	
Camp Rock 3	August 13, 2026	Various	
Seth MacFarlane Sings The Muppets	September 18, 2026	Seth MacFarlane	Released by Republic Records and Verve Records
Hexed (Original Motion Picture Soundtrack)	November 25, 2026	Various	

== See also ==
- Hollywood Records discography
- Lists of albums
