= Raven-Symoné discography =

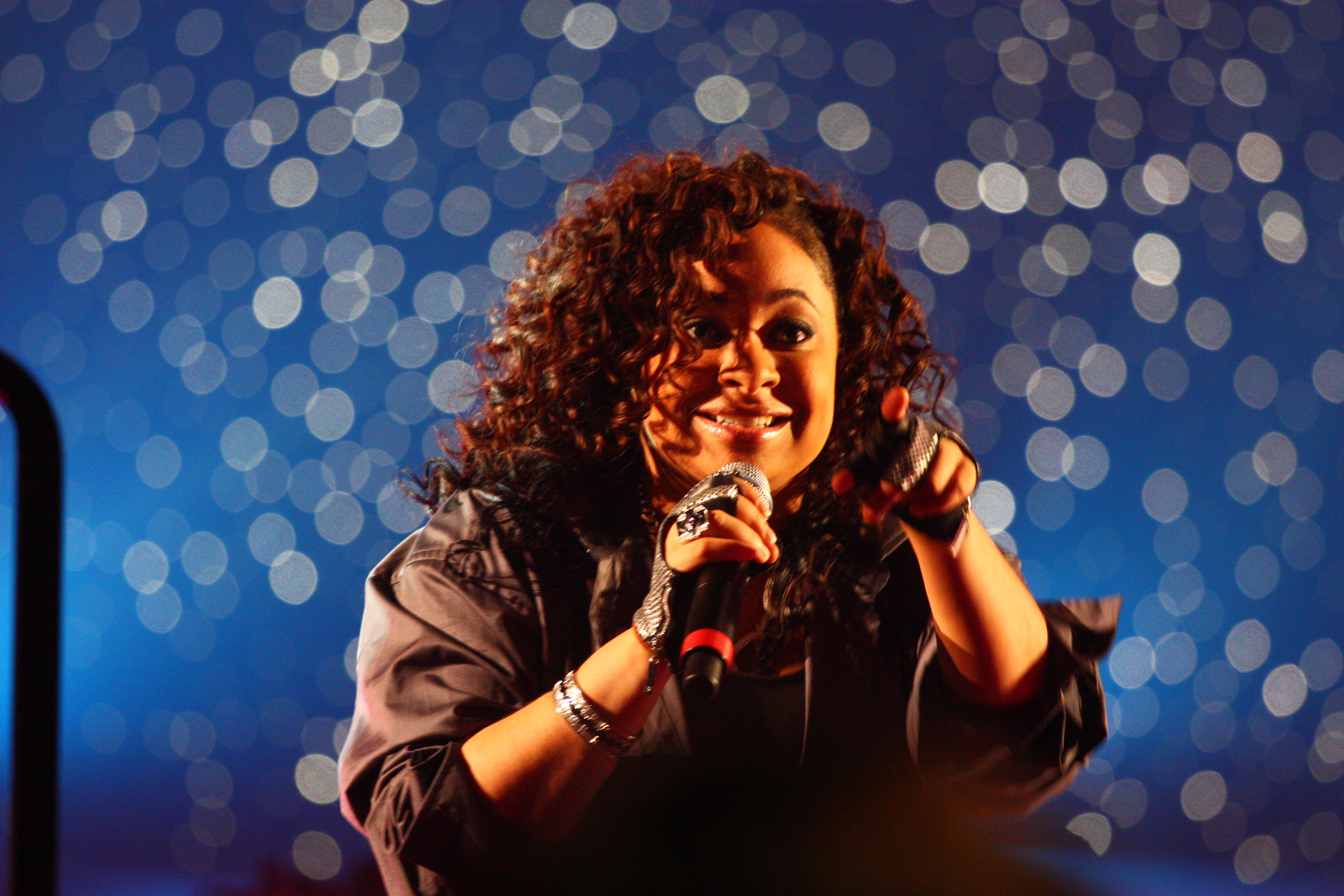
- Studio albums: 4
- Extended plays: 5
- Soundtrack albums: 4
- Compilation albums: 2
- Singles: 13
- Music videos: 15

The following is a discography for the American singer and songwriter Raven-Symoné. In 1993 she released her debut album Here's to New Dreams, which was preceded by her debut single "That's What Little Girls Are Made Of", charted at No. 68 on the US Billboard Hot 100. In 1996, Raven-Symoné signed a distribution deal with Crash Records for her second album Undeniable, which was released in May 1999. From 2003 to 2006 she released four soundtracks: The Cheetah Girls (2003) and The Cheetah Girls 2 (2006) from Disney Channel Original Movies and That's So Raven and That's So Raven Too! from Disney Channel Original Series.

Raven-Symoné signed a record deal with Disney-owned label Hollywood Records and her third album This Is My Time was released on September 21, 2004, and charted at No. 51 on the Billboard 200. The album produced singles "Grazing in the Grass" and "Backflip". Symoné released her fourth studio album Raven-Symoné on April 29, 2008. The album charted at No. 159 on the Billboard 200, and was preceded by the lead single, a cover of Frankie Smith's "Double Dutch Bus", on July 28, 2008.

Raven-Symoné began releasing music under her mononym Raven with the release of her EP 33000 on December 10, 2019.

== Albums ==
=== Studio albums ===
List of albums, with selected chart positions
Title	Album details	Peak chart positions		Sales
Title	Album details	US	US R&B	Sales
Here's to New Dreams	Released: June 22, 1993; Formats: CD, cassette; Label: MCA	—	—	US: 73,000
Undeniable	Released: May 4, 1999; Formats: CD, cassette; Label: Cash	—	—	US: 2,000
This Is My Time	Released: September 21, 2004; Formats: CD, digital download; Label: Hollywood	51	50	US: 235,000
Raven-Symoné	Released: April 29, 2008; Formats: CD, digital download; Label: Hollywood	159	—	
"—" denotes releases that did not chart or were not released in that territory.

=== Soundtrack albums ===
List of albums, with selected chart positions
Title	Album details	Peak chart positions							Certifications	Sales
Title	Album details	US	IRL	ITA	MEX	NOR	NZ	UK	Certifications	Sales
The Cheetah Girls (with The Cheetah Girls)	Released: August 12, 2003; Formats: CD; Label: Walt Disney	33	—	29	—	—	—	—	US: 2× Platinum	US: 2,000,000
That's So Raven	Released: May 18, 2004; Formats: CD, digital download; Label: Walt Disney	44	—	—	—	—	—	—	US: Gold	US: 491,000
That's So Raven Too!	Released: March 7, 2006; Formats: CD, digital download; Label: Walt Disney	44	—	—	—	—	—	—		US: 200,000
The Cheetah Girls 2 (with The Cheetah Girls)	Released: August 15, 2006; Formats: CD, digital download; Label: Walt Disney	5	55	58	68	32	32	59	US: Platinum; UK: Silver	US: 1,400,000
"—" denotes releases that did not chart or were not released in that territory.

=== Compilations ===
Title	Album details
Disney Karaoke Series	Released: March 1, 2005; Formats: CD; Label: Walt Disney
From Then Until	Released: November 14, 2006; Formats: CD; Label: TMG Records

== Extended plays ==
Title	EP details
Advance	Released: January 1, 2004; Formats: CD; Label: Hollywood
Secrets	Released: December 2008; Formats: Digital download; Label: Hollywood
Thick Girls, Big Girls	Released: June 6, 2009; Formats: Digital download; Label: Hollywood
33000	Released: December 10, 2019; Formats: Digital download; Label: Aubri
Infrasounds	Released: April 10, 2020; Formats: Digital download; Label: Aubri
Stripped Down	Released: July 3, 2020; Formats: Digital download; Label: Aubri

== Singles ==
=== As main artist ===
List of singles, with selected chart positions
Title	Year	Peak chart positions			Album
Title	Year	US	US R&B	US Rhy.	Album
"That's What Little Girls Are Made Of" (featuring Missy Elliott)	1993	68	47	39	Here's to New Dreams
"Raven Is the Flavor"	1993	—	—	—	Here's to New Dreams
"With a Child's Heart"	1999	—	—	—	Undeniable
"Backflip"	2004	—	—	—	This Is My Time
"Bump"	2005	—	—	—	This Is My Time
"Double Dutch Bus"	2008	—	—	—	Raven-Symoné
"Anti-Love Song"	2009	—	—	—	Raven-Symoné
"—" denotes releases that did not chart or were not released in that territory.

=== As featured artist ===
List of singles, with selected chart positions
Title	Year	Peak chart positions				Album
Title	Year	US	US Pop	NZ	UK	Album
"Cinderella" (among The Cheetah Girls)	2003	—	—	—	—	The Cheetah Girls
"Girl Power" (among The Cheetah Girls)	2003	—	—	—	—	The Cheetah Girls
"The Party's Just Begun" (among The Cheetah Girls)	2006	85	62	13	53	The Cheetah Girls 2
"Strut" (among The Cheetah Girls)	2006	53	44	—	—	The Cheetah Girls 2
"Step Up" (among The Cheetah Girls)	2006	—^{[A]}	84	—	—	The Cheetah Girls 2
"Amigas Cheetahs" (among The Cheetah Girls)	2006	—^{[B]}	87	—	—	The Cheetah Girls 2
"—" denotes items which were not released in that country or failed to chart.

=== Promotional singles ===
List of singles, with selected chart positions
Title	Year	Album
"Grazing in the Grass"	2004	The Lion King 1½

== Other appearances ==
Title	Year	Other(s) artist(s)	Album
"Hip Hop Teddy Bear"	1995	—N/a	Radio AAHS, No. 3
"I Can Get Away with Anything"	1995	—N/a	Happily Ever After: Fairy Tales for Every Child
"What's Wrong with This Picture"	1995	—N/a	Happily Ever After: Fairy Tales for Every Child
"Circle of Life"	2003	Disney Channel Circle of Stars	Disneymania 2
"Superstition"	2003	—N/a	The Haunted Mansion
"My Christmas Dream"	2003	—N/a	My Christmas Dream
"My Christmas Wish"	2003	—N/a	Wild Christmas
"Your Crowning Glory"	2004	Julie Andrews	The Princess Diaries 2: Royal Engagement
"This Is My Time"	2004	—N/a	The Princess Diaries 2: Royal Engagement
"True to Your Heart"	2004	—N/a	Disneymania 2
"Under the Sea"	2005	—N/a	Disneymania 3
"Life Is Beautiful"	2005	—N/a	Go Figure
"A Dream Is a Wish Your Heart Makes"	2006	Disney Channel Circle of Stars	Disneymania 4
"Gravity"	2006	—N/a	For One Night
"Keep Your Eye On the Ball"	2006	—N/a	Everyone's Hero
"This Christmas"	2007	—N/a	Now That's What I Call Xmas
"The Christmas Song"	2007	—N/a	Now That's What I Call Xmas
"Flying Monkey Lament 1"	2017	Todrick Hall	Straight Outta Oz

== Music videos ==
List of music videos, showing year released and director
Title	Year	Director
"That's What Little Girls Are Made Of"	1993	JJColine
"Raven Is the Flavor"	1993	JJColine
"With a Child's Heart"	1999	JJColine
"With a Child's Heart" (uptempo remix)	1999	JJColine
"With a Child's Heart" (ballad version)	1999	JJColine
"Superstition"	2003	Christopher B. Pearman
"Supernatural"	2004	Christopher B. Pearman
"Grazing in the Grass"	2004	—N/a
"True to Your Heart"	2004	—N/a
"Backflip"	2004	Sanaa Hamri
"Under the Sea"	2005	—N/a
"Some Call It Magic"	2006	Frank Sacramento
"Double Dutch Bus"	2008	Patrick Hoelck
"Raven's Pie"	2018	Paul Hoen

== Notes ==
Notes

- A "Step Up" did not enter the Billboard Hot 100 but peaked at number 6 on the Bubbling Under Hot 100 Singles chart.
- B "Amigas Cheetahs" did not enter the Billboard Hot 100 but peaked at number 10 on the Bubbling Under Hot 100 Singles chart.
