= List of songs recorded by Raven-Symoné =

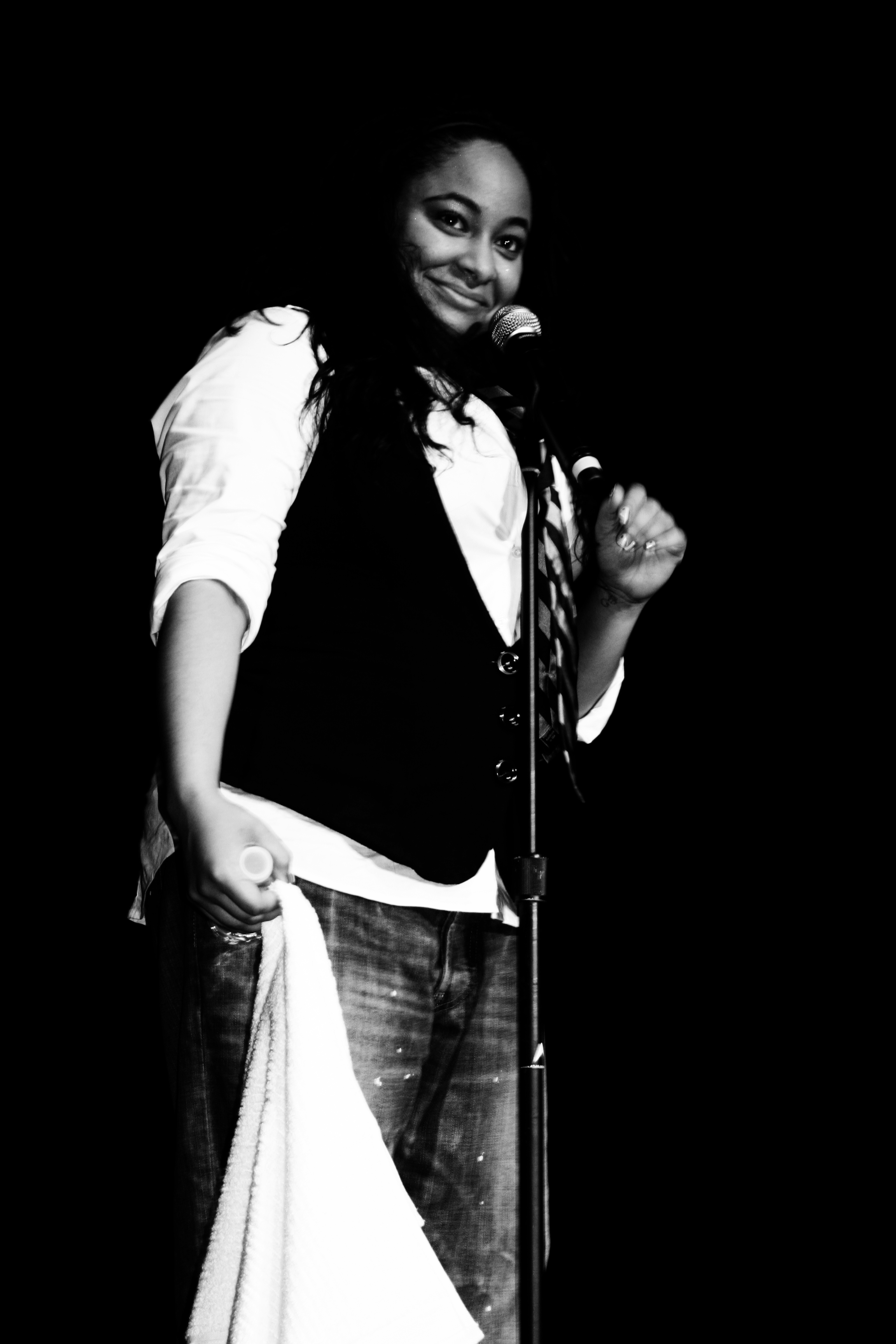
Raven-Symoné in 2008

A complete list of songs by the American actress, singer and songwriter "Raven-Symoné".

== Album songs ==
All songs that appear on studio albums released by Raven-Symoné.

A

- "Alice" (This Is My Time, 2004)
- "Anti-Love Song" (Raven-Symoné, 2008)

B

- "Backflip" (This Is My Time, 2004)
- "Best Friends" (Undeniable, 1999)
- "Betcha Didn't Know" (Here's to New Dreams, 1993)
- "Boring" (Infrasounds, 2020)
- "Bounce" (Undeniable, 1999)
- "Bu" (Infrasounds, 2020)
- "Bump" (This Is My Time, 2004)

C

- "Cleo" (Infrasounds, 2020)
- "Cruise Control" (released via SoundCloud Account)

D

- "Double Dutch Bus" (Raven-Symoné, 2008)

F

- "Face to Face" (Raven-Symoné (Australian edition), 2008; Thick Girls, Big Girls - EP, 2008; Secrets EP, 2008)
- "First Day of School" (Here's to New Dreams, 1993)
- "Fun Tonight" (Here's to New Dreams, 1993)

G

- "Ghost" (feat. Domino) (Infrasounds, 2020)
- "Girl Get It" (Raven-Symoné, 2008)
- "Grazing in the Grass" (This Is My Time, 2004)
- "Green" (Raven-Symoné, 2008)

H

- "Here's to New Dreams" (Here's to New Dreams, 1993)
- "Hip Hop Teddybear" (Here's to New Dreams, 1993)
- "Hip Hoppers" (Undeniable, 1999)
- "Hollywood Life" (Raven-Symoné, 2008)

I

- "I Can Get Down" (Undeniable, 1999)
- "I Love You" (Undeniable, 1999)
- "In the Pictures" (Raven-Symoné, 2008)
- "In Your Skin" (Raven-Symoné, 2008)

J

- "Just Fly Away" (This Is My Time, 2004)

K

- "Keep a Friend" (Raven-Symoné, 2008)

L

- "Lean on Me" (Undeniable, 1999)
- "Left Behind" (33000 EP, 2019)
- "Life Is Beautiful" (This Is My Time, 2004)
- "Love Me or Leave Me" (Raven-Symoné, 2008)

M

- "Magic In the Air" (Infrasounds, 2020)
- "Microdosing" (33000 EP, 2019)
- "Mystify" (This Is My Time, 2004)

N

- "Napswag" (Infrasounds, 2020)
- "Next" (Thick Girls, Big Girls - EP, 2008)

O

- "Ooh Boy" (Here's to New Dreams, 1993)
- "Overloved" (This Is My Time, 2004)

P

- "People Make the World Go Round" (Undeniable, 1999)
- "Pure Love" (Undeniable, 1999)

R

- "Rain" (Infrasounds, 2020)
- "Raven Is the Flavor" (Here's to New Dreams, 1993)
- "Raven's Lullaby" (Here's to New Dreams, 1993)

S

- "Sarafina" (released via SoundCloud account)
- "Secrets" (Secrets EP, 2008)
- "Set Me Free" (This Is My Time, 2004)
- "Shorts Like Me" (Raven-Symoné, 2008)
- "Skooldayz" (Infrasounds, 2020)
- "Slow Down" (Undeniable, 1999)
- "Spacetruck" (Infrasounds, 2020)
- "Stupid" (Raven-Symoné, 2008)

T

- "That Girl" (Raven-Symoné, 2008)
- "That's What Little Girls Are Made Of" (Here's to New Dreams, 1999)
- "Thick Girls, Big Girls" (Thick Girls, Big Girls - EP, 2009)
- "This Is My Time" (This Is My Time, 2004)
- "Through To You" /> (Secrets EP, 2008)
- "Typical" (This Is My Time, 2004)

W

- "Weird Day" (33000 EP, 2019)
- "What Are You Gonna Do?" (Raven-Symoné, 2008)
- "What Is Love?" (This Is My Time, 2004)
- "What's Real?" (This Is My Time, 2004)
- "With a Child's Heart" (Undeniable, 1999)

== Soundtrack releases ==
All songs in which Raven-Symoné have recorded for film on soundtrack releases.

| Year | Song | Album |
|---|---|---|
| 1997 | "I Can Get Away with Anything" | Happily Ever After: Fairy Tales for Every Child |
| 1997 | "What's Wrong with This Picture?" | Happily Ever After: Fairy Tales for Every Child |
| 2002 | "That's So Raven (Theme Song)" (w/ Orlando Brown and Anneliese van der Pol) | That's So Raven |
| 2002 | "My Christmas Dream" | School's Out! Christmas |
| 2003 | "Circle of Life" (with The Disney Channel Circle of Stars) | The Lion King (2-disc special edition DVD), Disneymania 2 |
| 2003 | "Superstition" | The Haunted Mansion: Haunted Hits |
| 2004 | "Grazing in the Grass" | The Lion King 1½, This Is My Time |
| 2004 | "True to Your Heart" | Ella Enchanted, Disneymania 2 |
| 2004 | "Supernatural" (Original version) | That's So Raven |
| 2004 | "Supernatural" (Darkchild remix) (re-released in the UK, produced by Rodney "Darkchild" Jerkins) | That's So Raven |
| 2004 | "Shine" | That's So Raven |
| 2004 | "This Is My Time" | The Princess Diaries 2: Royal Engagement |
| 2004 | "Your Crowning Glory" (with Julie Andrews) | The Princess Diaries 2: Royal Engagement |
| 2004 | "My Christmas Wish" | Radio Disney Jingle Jams, School's Out! Christmas |
| 2004 | "Under the Sea" | The Little Mermaid, Disneymania 3 |
| 2005 | "A Dream Is a Wish Your Heart Makes" (w/ The Disney Channel Circle of Stars) | Cinderella (2-disc special edition DVD), Disneymania 4 |
| 2005 | "Bump" | Ice Princess, This Is My Time |
| 2005 | "Life Is Beautiful" | Go Figure |
| 2006 | "Some Call It Magic" | That's So Raven Too! |
| 2006 | "Jump In" | That's So Raven Too! |
| 2006 | "This Is My Time (Remix)" | That's So Raven Too! |
| 2006 | "Supernatural (Too! Remix)" | That's So Raven Too! |
| 2006 | "Some Call It Magic (B.F.F. Mix)" | That's So Raven Too! |
| 2006 | "Little By Little" with Orlando Brown | That's So Raven Too! |
| 2006 | "Little By Little (Remix)" with Orlando Brown | That's So Raven Too! |
| 2006 | "Friends" with Anneliese van der Pol | That's So Raven Too! |
| 2006 | "Let's Stick Together" as part of That's So Raven cast | That's So Raven Too! |
| 2006 | "Gravity" | For One Night |
| 2006 | "Do Your Own Thing" | The Cheetah Girls 2 |
| 2006 | "Everyone's a Star" | The Cheetah Girls 2 |
| 2006 | "It's Gonna Be Alright" | The Cheetah Girls 2 |
| 2006 | "Keep Your Eye on the Ball" | Everyone's Hero |
| 2007 | "The Christmas Song (Chestnuts Roasting...)" | Now That's What I Call Xmas: Hollywood Records Sampler |
| 2007 | "This Christmas" | Now That's What I Call Xmas: Hollywood Records Sampler |
| 2008 | "Double Dutch Bus" | College Road Trip, Raven-Symoné |
| 2008 | "In the Pictures" | College Road Trip, Raven-Symoné |
| 2009 | "Some Call It Magic" | Wizards of Waverly Place |

== Unreleased songs ==
Songs that have been written/recorded by Raven-Symoné, but not released on a studio album or otherwise.

- "My Friends"
- "Are You Feelin' Me?"
- "Eviction Letter"
- "Got it Girl"
- "Runaway"
- "Your Friend"
- Ain't Enough
