= Love Library =

Love Library may refer one of two university libraries in the United States of America:

- Don L. Love Memorial Library, at the University of Nebraska–Lincoln in Lincoln, Nebraska
- Malcolm A. Love Library, at San Diego State University in San Diego, California

== See also ==
- At the Love Library, a 2009 EP by Everlife
