= Bill Bloom =

American songwriter

William A. Bloom (born December 10, 1948) is an American songwriter and musician.

Bloom was a staff writer and producer for Philadelphia International Records and WMOT Records. He co-wrote and produced the album Children of Tomorrow by Frankie Smith, including the 1981 hit song "Double Dutch Bus".
