= Everlife (2007 album) =

Studio album by Everlife
- Released: February 20, 2007
- Recorded: 2002–2006
- Studio: Paramount Recording Studios (Hollywood, California); Glenwood Place Studios (Burbank, California); B. Y. Studios (Venice, California); Coney Island Studios, The Ballroom Studios and Barton: Holt Studios (Los Angeles, California); Your Place Or Mine Recording (Glendale, California); Ivy Studios (Nashville, Tennessee)
- Genre: Pop rock; power pop; pop punk; CCM
- Length: 44:07
- Label: Buena Vista
- Producer: Matthew Gerrard: Adam Watts and Andy Dodd; Bryan Todd and Michael "Smidi" Smith; Daniel Cage; Fred Mollin; Jamie Houston; Kevan Cyka and Dan Needham; Mark Hammond

Everlife chronology
Everlife (2004)	Everlife (2007)	At the Love Library (2009)

Singles from Everlife
- 1. "Look Through My Eyes" Released: 2006; 2. "Find Yourself in You" Released: 2006; 3. "I Could Get Used to This" Released: 2007; 4. "Goodbye" Released: 2007

Professional ratings
Review scores
Source	Rating
AllMusic	4/5 stars

Everlife is the third studio album by Everlife, and the first and only album on Buena Vista Records released on February 20, 2007.

Originally entitled Now or Never, it was instead the band's second consecutive eponymous album.

== Track listing ==
Standard edition
No.	Title	Writer(s)	Producer(s)	Length
1.	"Faded"	Matthew Gerrard; Robbie Nevil; Jessica Origliasso; Lisa Origliasso	Gerrard	3:41
2.	"Goodbye"	Adam Watts; Andy Dodd; Amber Hezlep; Julia Ross; Sarah Ross	Watts; Dodd	3:16
3.	"I Could Get Used to This"	Joshua Berman; J. Origliasso; L. Origliasso; William Steinberg	Bryan Todd; Michael "Smidi" Smith	3:27
4.	"Where You Are"	Daniel Cage; Hezlep; J. Ross; S. Ross	Cage	3:32
5.	"Static"	Ashley Gorley; Chris Farren	Todd; Smidi	3:27
6.	"What I Like About You" (live in studio)	Walter Palamarchuk; Jimmy Marinos; Mike Skill	Fred Mollin	3:08
7.	"Daring to Be Different"	Jamie Houston; Hezlep; J. Ross; S. Ross	Houston	3:45
8.	"Find Yourself in You"	Gerrard; Hezlep; J. Ross; S. Ross	Gerrard	3:33
9.	"Look Through My Eyes"	Phil Collins	Kevan Cyka; Dan Needham	3:10
10.	"Now or Never"	Gerrard; Hezlep; J. Ross; S. Ross	Gerrard	3:03
11.	"Real Wild Child"	Johnny Greenan; Johnny O'Keefe; Dave Owens	Mark Hammond	3:15
12.	"Go Figure"	Watts; Dodd	Dodd; Watts; Cyka (vocal)	4:08
13.	"Angels Cry"	Cyka; Needham; Hezlep; J. Ross; S. Ross	Cyka; Needham; Cage (addl. vocal)	4:02

CBA edition bonus tracks
No.	Title	Writer(s)	Producer(s)	Length
14.	"I Can Love You"	Cyka; Needham; Hezlep; J. Ross; S. Ross	Cage	3:50
15.	"Heaven Open Your Eyes"	Cyka; Needham; Hezlep; J. Ross; S. Ross	Cyka; Needham	3:27

Japan bonus tracks
No.	Title	Writer(s)	Producer(s)	Length
14.	"I Can See Clearly Now"	Johnny Nash	Cage	3:12
15.	"I'm Over It"	Cyka; Needham; Hezlep; J. Ross; S. Ross	Cyka; Needham	3:34
16.	"I Can Love You"	Cyka; Needham; Hezlep; J. Ross; S. Ross	Cage	3:50
17.	"Heaven Open Your Eyes"	Cyka; Needham; Hezlep; J. Ross; S. Ross	Cyka; Needham	3:27
18.	"Strangers Like Me"	Collins		3:31

=== Notes ===
- The album contains several covers:
  - "Faded", co-written by The Veronicas and originally recorded by Kate DeAraugo; later covered by Cascada
  - "I Could Get Used To This", by The Veronicas
  - "What I Like About You", by The Romantics
  - "Look Through My Eyes" and "Strangers Like Me", by Phil Collins for the Disney films Brother Bear and Tarzan, respectively
  - "Real Wild Child", by Johnny O'Keefe, later popularized by Iggy Pop
  - "I Can See Clearly Now", by Johnny Nash
- Several tracks were previously released on other Walt Disney Records albums:
  - "Strangers Like Me", on Disneymania 3
  - "Go Figure", on the Go Figure soundtrack
  - "I Can See Clearly Now", on That's So Raven Too!
  - "Look Through My Eyes", on Disneymania 4
  - "Real Wild Child", on The Wild soundtrack
  - "Find Yourself in You", on the first Hannah Montana soundtrack
- "Angels Cry" and "Heaven Open Your Eyes" originally appeared on the band's previous album but were re-recorded for this album.
  - "I'm Over It" appears in the recording from the previous album.
- "Find Yourself in You" was used in a TV spot for the film Penelope.

== Personnel ==
Everlife

- Amber Hezlep – vocals, guitars (6)
- Julia Ross – vocals
- Sarah Ross – vocals, guitars (6)

Musicians

- Matthew Gerrard – keyboards (1, 8, 10), guitars (1, 8, 10), bass (1, 8, 10), arrangements (1, 8, 10)
- Marco Luciani – keyboards (1)
- Andy Dodd – programming (2, 12), guitars (2, 12)
- Adam Watts – programming (2, 12), drums (2, 12)
- Michael "Smidi" Smith – programming (3, 5), arrangements (3, 5)
- Buck Johnson – keyboards (7), string arrangements (7)
- Kevan Cyka – acoustic piano (13)
- Bruce Watson – guitars (3, 5)
- Dino Meneghin – guitars (4, 14)
- Fred Mollin – guitars (6)
- Dean Parks – guitars (6)
- Jamie Houston – guitars (7), drum programming (7), live percussion (7), arrangements (7)
- Don Kirkpatrick – guitars (7)
- George Cocchini – guitars (9)
- Dan Needham – guitars (9, 13), drums (9, 13, 15), acoustic guitar (15)
- Gary Burnette – guitars (13, 15)
- David J. Carpenter – bass (2)
- Mike Mennell – bass (3, 5)
- Paul Bryan – bass (4, 14)
- Solomon Snyder – bass (6)
- Tad Wadhams – bass (7)
- Mark Hill – bass (9)
- Nic Rodriguez – bass (12)
- Joey Canaday – bass (13, 15)
- Randy Cooke – drums (1, 6)
- Graham Ward – drums (3, 5)
- Herman Matthews – drums (4, 14)
- Denny Weston Jr. – drums (7)
- Greg Critchley – drums (8, 10)
- Kevin Ricard – percussion (4, 14)
- Bryan Todd – arrangements (3, 5)
- Blake Neely – additional arrangements (4)
- Mark Hammond – arrangements (11)

=== Production ===
- Dani Markman – executive producer
- Fred Mollin – executive producer
- Matthew Gerrard – producer (1, 8, 10)
- Andy Dodd – producer (2, 12), mixing (2, 12)
- Adam Watts – producer (2, 12), mixing (2, 12)
- Michael "Smidi" Smith – producer (3, 5), engineer (3, 5)
- Bryan Todd – producer (3, 5)
- Daniel Cage – producer (4, 14), additional vocal production (13)
- Fred Mollin – producer (6)
- Jamie Houston – producer (7), engineer (7)
- Kevan Cyka – producer (9, 13, 15), vocal producer (12)
- Dan Needham – producer (9, 13, 15)
- Mark Hammond – producer (11)
- Brian Paturalski – mixing (1)
- Mark Needham – mixing (3, 5)
- Gardner Knight – engineer (4, 14)
- Mark Linett – engineer (6), mixing (6)
- Joel Soyffer – mixing (7)
- Krish Sharma – mixing (8, 10)
- Rob Chiarelli – mixing (9)
- Dave Dillbeck – recording (11), editing (11)
- Serban Ghenea – mixing (11)
- Shane D. Wilson – mixing (13, 15)
- Will Brierre – assistant engineer (3, 5)
- Joe Baldridge – additional recording (11)
- Nathan Watkins – additional editing (11)
- Stephen Marcussen – mastering (1–12, 14) at Marcussen Mastering (Hollywood, California)
- Richard Dodd – mastering (13, 15)
- Lindsey Goldstein – production coordinator (3, 5)
- Steve Gerdes – creative direction
- Tim Hawkins – album design
- Michael Gomez – cover photography
- Sheila Davis-Curtis – make-up
- Michelle Mitchell, Philip McIntyre and Johnny Wright – artist management
