= Angels Cry =

Angels Cry or Angel's Cry may refer to:

- Angels Cry (album), an album by Angra, or the title song
- "Angels Cry" (song), a song by Mariah Carey
- "Angels Cry", a song by Everlife from Everlife (2004)
- Angel's Cry, an album by Geasa
- Angel's Cry, a film by Pierre Roland
- The Angels Cry, a song written by Justin Hayward and released separately by Agnetha Fältskog and Annie Haslam in 1985
