= Huckapoo =

American girl group

- Origin: New York City, U.S.
- Genres: Pop; teen pop; bubblegum pop; dance-pop
- Years active: 2003–2008
- Past members: Brittney Segal; Brittany Lahm; Lindsay Nyman; Jordan Price; Brooke Mori

Huckapoo was an American teen pop girl group formed in late 2003 by Brian Lukow, co-creator of teen pop boy band Dream Street. The group comprises Brittney Segal ("Angel Sparks"), Brittany Lahm ("Twiggy Stardom"), Lindsay Nyman ("Joey Thunders"), Jordan Lane Price ("Groovy Tuesday"), and Brooke Mori ("PJ Bardot").

== History ==
Having managed the boy band Dream Street prior, Lukow wanted to reprise Dream Street's success and marketability through a female lens. With young females dominating the fanbase of the teen pop zeitgeist at the time, Lukow molded Huckapoo's image to the Girl Power individuality of the Spice Girls. As a result, its group members each portray an alias.

Their aliases were characters from different social groups typically found on any high school campus.

- Brittney Segal: As Angel Sparks, a biker.
- Brittany Lahm: As Twiggy Stardom, a preppy cheerleader.
- Lindsay Nyman: As Joey Thunders, a punk.
- Jordan Price: As Groovy Tuesday, a flower child hippie.
- Brooke Mori: As P.J. Bardot, a hip-hop princess.

While the group had recorded songs for live shows and promotion, they did not release an album. Instead, most of their recorded material have been featured on several Disney compilation albums including That's So Raven. Their song "Perfectly" is on the Disney original movie soundtrack, Pixel Perfect. In April 2006, Segal left the group and the band continued to perform as a quartet. In the following year, their songs were featured in the film Spy School, along with their own version of "Macho Man". By 2008, the rest of the members went their separate ways.
