= Double Dutch Bus =

1981 single by Frankie Smith

Single by Frankie Smith

from the album Children of Tomorrow
- B-side: "Double Dutch"
- Released: February 22, 1981
- Recorded: 1980
- Studio: Alpha International, Philadelphia
- Genre: Funk, old-school hip-hop
- Length: 3:29
- Label: WMOT
- Songwriters: Bill Bloom, Frankie Smith
- Producers: Bill Bloom, Frankie Smith

Music video
- "Double Dutch Bus" Official video on YouTube

"Double Dutch Bus" is a funk song by Frankie Smith from his 1981 album Children of Tomorrow, made famous for its extensive use of the "izz" infix form of slang. It was released in February 1981, although some sources indicate 1980 as the original release date. The single capitalized on the concepts of the double-decker bus and the jump rope game called Double Dutch, popular with American children since the early 1970s. The song became a foundation of hip-hop and dance music.

Co-written by Bill Bloom of WMOT Records, "Double Dutch Bus" hit number 1 for four weeks on the Billboard Best Selling Soul Singles chart.

== History ==
"Double Dutch Bus" was released in late 1980 and gained momentum on the charts in mid-1981. The song's rhythm and lyrics are based on the Double Dutch jump rope game. Such games were played by urban school children and in 1973 they were formalized into a team sport in New York City. The song lyrics follow the pattern of older skipping-rope rhymes, and they mention the TransPass used by the SEPTA bus system in Philadelphia.

In the 1970s, the Double Dutch jump rope game was growing quickly in popularity, with the Fantastic Four competition team (four high school girls from New York) winning the Double Dutch World Championship and appearing in commercials for McDonald's.

== Production and reception ==
Using the stage name Franklin Franklin, Frankie Smith wrote a song called "Double Dutch", published as a 7-inch single by Paramount Records in 1973, arranged by Caldwell McMillan Jr. and produced by Schulman Music but it did not chart. After Smith saw that the jump rope game was again rising in the media, he and co-writer Bill Bloom persuaded contacts at WMOT Records to finance an updated version; it was recorded in 1980, engineered by Gene Leone at Alpha International, Philadelphia. The song rocketed to popularity in a matter of weeks and debuted on the U.S. Billboard Hot Soul Singles chart in February, rising to the top spot by July, where it held at number one for four weeks. It also crossed over to the Billboard Hot 100, where it peaked at number 30 in the summer of 1981.

The record became only the second in history (following the 1979 Barbra Streisand/Donna Summer duet "No More Tears (Enough Is Enough)") to receive two separate standard-release Gold certifications from the RIAA: first in June 1981 for sales of the 12-inch single; and a second Gold record in September 1981 for sales of the 7-inch radio edit.

In the National Geographic documentary King of Coke: Living the High Life, Smith explains how the song was composed. He also states that WMOT Records failed to pay him his royalties and he therefore was unable to pay his taxes. An investigation was started which brought to light that WMOT Records was not only badly managed but was in fact laundering money for Larry Lavin, a.k.a. Dr. Snow, a dentist who was secretly dealing cocaine.

== Track listings ==
- U.S. 7-inch single – WMOT Records WS8 5356
1. "Double Dutch Bus" – 3:29
2. "Double Dutch" – 4:33
- U.S. 12-inch single – WMOT Records 4W8 5351
1. "Double Dutch Bus" – 5:20
2. "Double Dutch" – 4:33
- Canada 12-inch single – P.B.I. Records W12-107
1. "Double Dutch" / "Double Dutch Bus" (Special Disco Mix) – 9:00
2. "Double Dutch" – 4:33
- Canada CD maxi-single (1994) – Unidisc SP5-1683
1. "Double Dutch Bus" – 5:20
2. "Triple Dutch" – 6:01
3. "Double Dutch Bus" (Original 12" Mix) – 8:25
4. "Double Dutch Bus" (Radio Edit) – 4:18

== Chart positions ==
Chart (1981)	Peak position
Belgium (Ultratop 50)	19
Netherlands (Dutch Single Top 100)	7
U.S. Billboard Hot Soul Singles	1
U.S. Billboard Hot 100	30
U.S. Billboard Disco Top 100	51

=== Sampling ===
The song was sampled by Missy Elliott for use in the song "Gossip Folks" featuring Ludacris from her 2002 album Under Construction.

== Raven-Symoné version ==
"Double Dutch Bus"

Single by Raven-Symoné

from the album Raven-Symoné
- Released: February 9, 2008
- Recorded: 2007
- Genre: Funk, hip hop
- Length: 3:02
- Label: Hollywood
- Songwriters: Bill Bloom; Frankie Smith
- Producers: The Clutch; Bill Jabr (additional production)

Raven-Symoné singles chronology
"Backflip" (2004)	"Double Dutch Bus" (2008)	"Anti-Love Song" (2009)

"Double Dutch Bus" was covered by Raven-Symoné in 2008. The track was released to promote the film College Road Trip and is the lead single from her eponymous fourth album. The single was placed on Radio Disney on February 9, 2008 and became available for digital download through iTunes on March 4, 2008.

=== Music video ===
The music video premiered on the Disney Channel on February 18, 2008. The music video shows Raven and others dancing under a disco ball and enjoying a party bus. Images from the film College Road Trip are also seen. Cast member Donny Osmond makes a cameo appearance in the video, which was directed by Patrick Hoelck.

=== Track listing ===
CD single/digital download

1. "Double Dutch Bus" - 3:02

=== Radio and release history ===
Country	Date	Label	Format
United States	February 9, 2008	Hollywood Records	Radio Disney
United States	March 4, 2008	Hollywood Records	CD single, digital download

== See also ==
- List of number-one R&B singles of 1981 (U.S.)
