= Raven-Symoné (album) =

Studio album by Raven-Symoné
- Released: April 29, 2008
- Recorded: 2007–2008
- Genre: R&B
- Length: 45:13
- Label: Hollywood
- Producers: Raven-Symoné; the Clutch; Sean Garrett; Oak; Kwamé; Eric Hudson; the JAM; Full Scale; Clubba Langg; Great Scott; Bill Jabr

Raven-Symoné chronology
This Is My Time (2004)	Raven-Symoné (2008)	Stripped Down (2020)

Singles from Raven-Symoné
- 1. "Double Dutch Bus" Released: February 9, 2008; 2. "Anti-Love Song" Released: March 27, 2009

Professional ratings
Review scores
Source	Rating
Common Sense Media	4/5 stars
Gossip On This	2.5/3 stars

Raven-Symoné is the fourth studio album by American singer-songwriter and actress Raven-Symoné. The album was released on April 29, 2008, in the United States. It was her last album released by Hollywood Records.

== Production ==
On April 19, 2007, singer Mario was interviewed by Billboard magazine and he stated that he and his production team, Knightwritaz, had recently worked with Raven-Symoné. She also worked with producers such as The Clutch, Sean Garrett, Kwamé, Eric Hudson and The JAM. Sean Garrett is featured on two songs on the album, "What Are You Gonna Do?" and "Stupid."

Raven-Symoné told Blackfilm.com, "Raven-Symoné is a party album. There are only 2 slow songs, but it's really energetic. It's something you can put on when you are cleaning the house or you are about to come out to a party, or you need to wake up to go to school. It will be fun to perform. I go on tour soon."

== Promotion ==
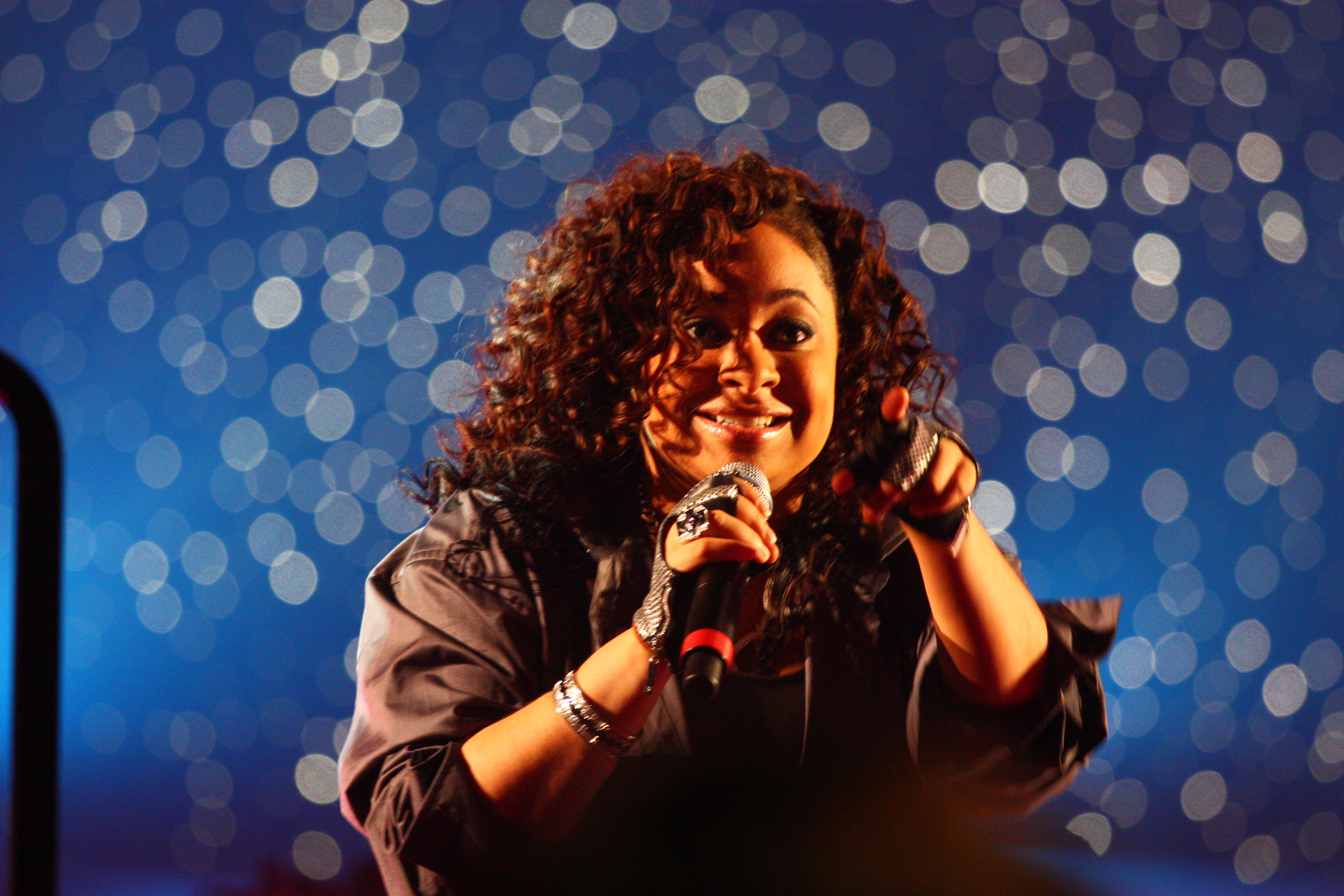
Raven performing at the Disson Skating & Gymnastics Spectacular

In the United States, accompanied by the single "Double Dutch Bus" (a promo single from Raven-Symoné's film College Road Trip).

Disney Channel did a short series "Raven-Symoné For Real" talking about Raven's new songs and videos. It showed interviews with her where she talked about the new songs and which ones were her favorites, etc. The short series did not air often, and only two episodes were ever produced.

Raven has appeared on The Today Show, Good Day New York, and other local news/morning talk shows to promote the album. Symoné also appeared at World Wrestling Entertainment's flagship Pay-Per-View event Wrestlemania XXIV to present the children from the Make-A-Wish Foundation in attendance, where her album was mentioned by the ring announcer. Hollywood Records also opened an official Myspace for Raven which had a few songs on it. It was said to be a way to be promoting the album and was supposed to have a new song every week leading up to the release of the new album.

=== Tour ===
A concert tour, The Pajama Party Tour, to promote the album was scheduled to begin in spring 2008; AEG Live cancelled the tour, citing "unforeseen circumstances". Later on, Raven-Symoné confirmed that the tour would be rescheduled and would kick off in the Summer of 2008. The tour now dubbed the "Raven-Symoné: Live Tour" kicked off in July 2008, and continued through 2009.

== Commercial performance ==
Raven-Symoné debuted at number 159 on the US Billboard 200 of week dated May 17, 2008, with first week sales of 4,400 copies (lowest debut in the chart to date); making it Raven-Symoné's second album to enter the chart in the United States.

== Track listing ==
Raven-Symoné track listing
No.	Title	Writer(s)	Producer(s)	Length
1.	"That Girl"	Chasity Nwagbara, Kwamé Holland	Kwamé	3:47
2.	"Anti-Love Song"	Frankie Storm, Mario Barrett, Warren Felder	Oak	3:41
3.	"In the Pictures"	Storm, Eric Hudson	Eric Hudson	4:07
4.	"What Are You Gonna Do?"	Sean Garrett, Walter Scott	Sean Garrett, Great Scott	3:07
5.	"Green"	Nwagbara, Holland	Kwamé	3:49
6.	"Love Me or Leave Me"	Marsha Ambrosius, Felder	Oak	3:23
7.	"In Your Skin"	Storm, Felder	Oak	3:24
8.	"Stupid"	Sean Garrett, Ray Oglesby	Sean Garrett, Clubba Langg	3:16
9.	"Girl Get It"	Sean Garrett, Ray Oglesby	Sean Garrett, Clubba Langg	3:43
10.	"Keep a Friend"	Ezekiel Lewis, Patrick Smith, Balewa Muhammad, Candice Nelson, Jordan Suecof, Darhyl Camper, Jr.	The Clutch, Full Scale	2:38
11.	"Shorts Like Me"	Sean Garrett, Elvis Williams	Sean Garrett, Blac Elvis	3:23
12.	"Hollywood Life"	Nikki Flores, Michael Mani, Jordan Omley	The JAM	3:52
13.	"Double Dutch Bus"	Frankie Smith, Bill Bloom	The Clutch, Bill Jabr	3:02

=== Thick Girls, Big Girls EP ===
An extended play of unreleased songs from the album was unexpectedly released as a free-of-charge podcast titled "Thick Girls, Big Girls – EP" on the iTunes Store on June 6, 2009. The podcast upload was eventually taken down.

No.	Title	Writer(s)	Producer(s)	Length
1.	"Face to Face"	Storm, Scott MacFarland Carter, Damon Hayes, Felder	Oak, Matrax	3:40
2.	"Next"	Storm, Carter, Hayes, Felder	Oak, Matrax	2:49
3.	"Thick Girls, Big Girls"	Sean Garrett, Ray Oglesby	Oak	3:12

== Personnel ==
Credits adopted from AllMusic.

- Vocals – Raven-Symoné
- Guitar – Curtis Hudson

=== Production ===
- Executive producer: Allison Hamamura
- Producers: The Clutch, Sean Garrett, Oak & Mario, Kwamé, Eric Hudson, The JAM, Full Scale, Clubba Langg
- Mastering: Stephen Marcussen
- Engineers: Walter R. Brooks Jr., Ralph Cacciurri, Dave Hyman, Jam, Vernon Mungo, James Murray and Miles Walker
- Mixing: Brian Stanley, John Fry, Jaycen Hoshua, Dave Hyman, Glen Marchese and Dave Pensado
- Photography: Sheryl Nields

== Charts ==
Chart performance for Raven-Symoné
Chart (2008)	Peak position
US Billboard 200	159

== Release history ==
Release history and formats for Raven-Symoné
Country	Date	Label
Canada	April 29, 2008	Universal Music
United States	April 29, 2008	Hollywood
Australia	July 26, 2008	EMI
