= List of awards and nominations received by Raven-Symoné =

Raven-Symoné awards and nominations
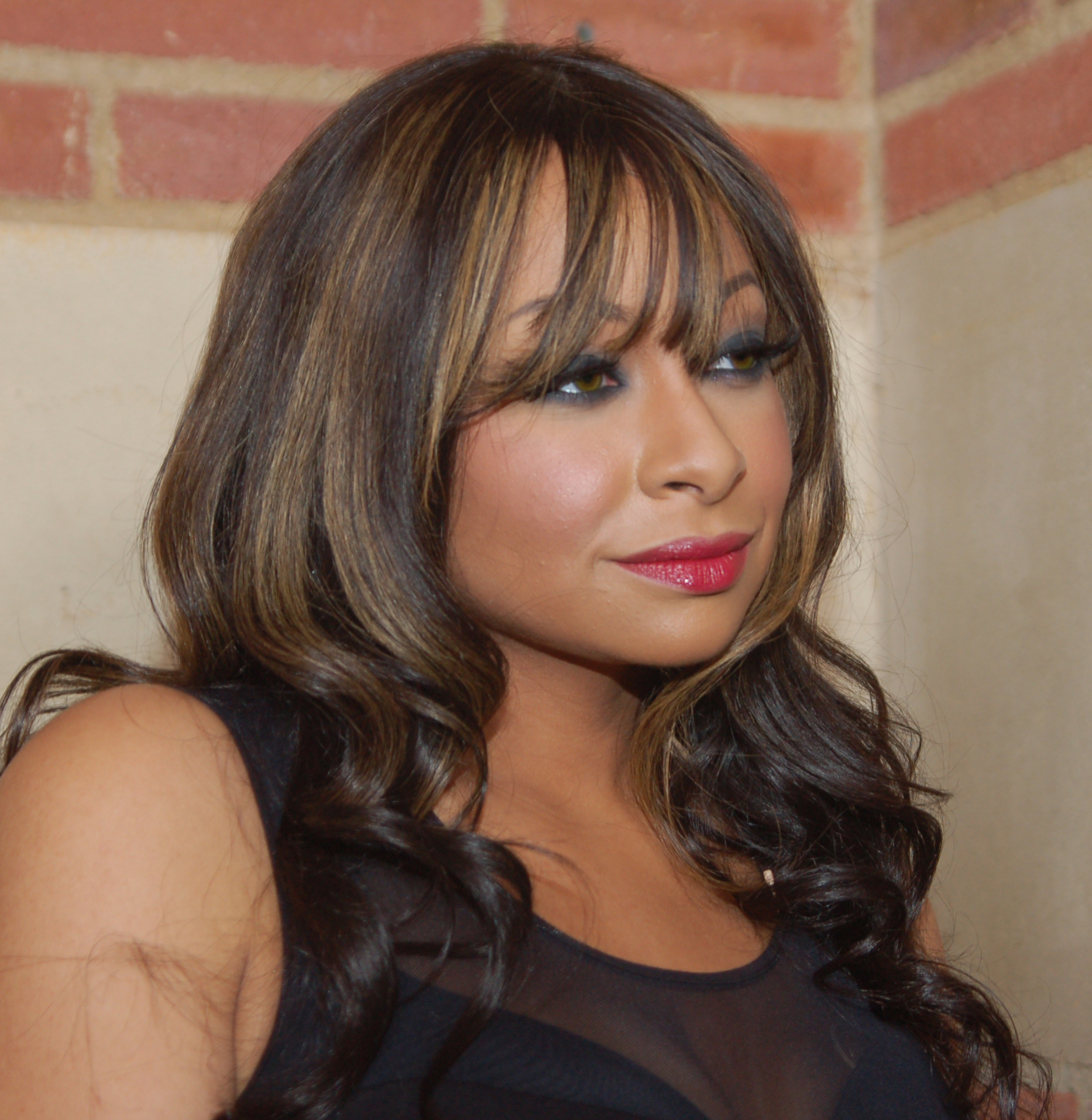
- Raven-Symoné at a performance of The Hot Chocolate Nutcracker in December 2010
Awards and nominations
Award	Wins	Nominations
BET Comedy Awards	0	3
Daytime Emmy Awards	0	3
Image Awards	5	3
Nickelodeon Kids' Choice Awards	2	4
Radio Disney Music Awards	1	1
Teen Choice Awards	0	4
Young Artist Awards	3	4

Totals (Note: Certain award groups do not simply award one winner. They acknowledge several different recipients, have runners-up, and have third place. Since this is a specific recognition and is different from losing an award, runner-up mentions are considered wins in this award tally. For simplification and to avoid errors, each award in this list has been presumed to have had a prior nomination.)
- Wins: 12
- Nominations: 27

This is a list of awards and accolades awarded to Raven-Symoné.

== BET Comedy Awards ==
Year	Nominee / work	Award	Result
2004	That's So Raven	Outstanding Lead Actress in a Comedy Series	Nominated
2005	That's So Raven	Outstanding Lead Actress in a Comedy Series	Nominated
2005	Kim Possible: So the Drama	Best Performance in an Animated Theatrical Film	Nominated

== Black Reel Awards ==
Year	Nominee / work	Award	Result
2004	The Cheetah Girls	Television: Best Actress	Nominated

== Emmy Awards ==
=== Children's and Family Emmy Awards ===
Year	Nominee / work	Award	Result
2022	Raven's Home	Outstanding Directing for a Multiple Camera Program	Nominated
2025	Raven's Home	Outstanding Lead Performer in a Preschool, Children's or Young Teen Program	Nominated

=== Daytime Emmy Awards ===
Year	Nominee / work	Award	Result
2016	The View	Outstanding Entertainment Talk Show Host (shared with Joy Behar, Candace Cameron Bure, Michelle Collins, Paula Faris, Whoopi Goldberg, Rosie Perez, and Nicolle Wallace)	Nominated
2017	The View	Outstanding Entertainment Talk Show Host (shared with Joy Behar, Jedediah Bila, Candace Cameron Bure, Paula Faris, Whoopi Goldberg, Sara Haines, and Sunny Hostin)	Nominated
2018	Raven's Home	Outstanding Performer in a Children’s, Preschool Children’s or Educational and Informational Program	Nominated

== Gracie Allen Awards ==
Year	Nominee / work	Award	Result
2005	That's So Raven	Outstanding Female Lead in a Comedy	Nominated

== Kids' Choice Awards ==
Year	Nominee / work	Award	Result
2002	Dr. Dolittle 2	Favorite Female Movie Star	Nominated
2004	That's So Raven	Favorite Television Actress	Won
2005	That's So Raven	Favorite Television Actress	Won
2006	That's So Raven	Favorite Television Actress	Nominated
2007	That's So Raven	Favorite Television Actress	Nominated
2008	That's So Raven	Favorite Television Actress	Nominated
2019	Raven's Home	Favorite Female TV Star	Nominated
2020	Raven's Home	Favorite Female TV Star	Nominated
2021	Raven's Home	Favorite Female TV Star	Nominated
2022	Raven's Home	Favorite Female TV Star (Kids)	Nominated

== NAACP Image Awards ==
Year	Nominee / work	Award	Result
1996	Hangin' with Mr. Cooper	Outstanding Youth Actor/Actress	Nominated
2002	Dr. Dolittle 2	Outstanding Youth Actor/Actress	Nominated
2004	That's So Raven	Outstanding Performance in a Youth/Children's Program (Series or Special)	Won
2005	That's So Raven	Outstanding Performance in a Youth/Children's Program (Series or Special)	Won
2006	That's So Raven	Outstanding Performance in a Youth/Children's Program (Series or Special)	Won
2007	That's So Raven	Outstanding Performance in a Youth/Children's Program (Series or Special)	Won
2008	That's So Raven	Outstanding Performance in a Youth/Children's Program (Series or Special)	Won
2008	That's So Raven	Outstanding Actress in a Comedy Series	Nominated
2018	Raven's Home	Outstanding Performance in a Youth/Children's Program (Series or Special)	Nominated

== NAMIC Vision Awards ==
Year	Nominee / work	Award	Result
2004	That's So Raven	Best Comedic Performance	Nominated
2005	That's So Raven	Best Comedic Performance	Nominated
2008	That's So Raven	Best Performance - Comedy	Nominated

== Nollywood and African Film Critics Awards ==
Year	Nominee / work	Award	Result
2015	A Girl Like Grace	Best Supporting Actress in a Foreign Film	Nominated

== Radio Disney Music Awards ==
Year	Nominee / work	Award	Result
2005	Raven-Symoné	Best Actor/Actress-Turned-Singer	Won
2006	Raven-Symoné	Favorite TV Star Who Sings	Nominated
2006	Raven-Symoné	Most Stylish Singer	Nominated

== Teen Choice Awards ==
Year	Nominee / work	Award	Result
2004	That's So Raven	Choice TV Actress: Comedy	Nominated
2005	That's So Raven	Choice TV Actress: Comedy	Nominated
2006	That's So Raven	TV - Choice Actress: Comedy	Nominated
2011	State of Georgia	Choice Summer TV Star: Female	Nominated

== TV Land Awards ==
Year	Nominee / work	Award	Result
2011	The Cosby Show	Impact Award (to cast)	Won

== Young Artist Awards ==
Year	Nominee / work	Award	Result
1990	The Cosby Show	Outstanding Performance by an Actress Under Nine Years of Age	Nominated
1991	The Cosby Show	Exceptional Performance by a Young Actress Under Nine	Won
1993	The Cosby Show	Outstanding Actress Under Ten in a Television Series	Nominated
1994	Hangin' with Mr. Cooper	Best Youth Comedienne	Nominated
2004	That's So Raven	Best Performance in a TV Series (Comedy or Drama): Leading Young Actress	Nominated
2005	Raven-Symoné	Michael Landon Award	Won
2005	That's So Raven	Outstanding Young Performers in a TV Series	Won

== Young Star Awards ==
Year	Nominee / work	Award	Result
1999	Zenon: Girl of the 21st Century	Best Performance by a Young Actress in a Mini-Series/Made for TV Film	Nominated
