= With a Child's Heart =

1966 song by Stevie Wonder also covered by Michael Jackson

"With a Child's Heart" is a song written by Sylvia Moy, Henry Cosby, and Vicki Basemore for Motown and first released by singer Stevie Wonder, on his album Up-Tight. The song was released as the B-side to the single "Nothing's Too Good for My Baby". A cover version of the song was a chart hit for Michael Jackson in 1973.

== Stevie Wonder version ==
Stevie's original version of With a Child's Heart was released in 1966, as the "B" side to his hit, "Nothing's Too Good For My Baby". Both songs were taken from his successful album, Up-Tight. Although this version completely missed the Billboard Hot 100, it was a R&B hit, reaching the Top 10 of Billboard's R&B Chart, peaking at number 8.

== Michael Jackson version ==
"With a Child's Heart"

Single by Michael Jackson

from the album Music & Me
- B-side: "Morning Glow"
- Released: May 5, 1973
- Recorded: March 1972
- Length: 3:34
- Label: Motown
- Songwriters: Sylvia Moy; Henry Cosby; Vicki Basemore
- Producers: Freddie Perren; Fonce Mizell

Michael Jackson singles chronology
"Ben" (1972)	"With a Child's Heart" (1973)	"Happy" (1973)

The song was later covered by singer Michael Jackson and released as the first single from his 1973 album Music & Me. The song peaked at number 50 on the Billboard Pop Singles chart, number 14 on the US R&B chart, and number 23 on the US adult contemporary chart. Nearly all disc pressings of the Michael Jackson single had a track called "Morning Glow", the ninth track on the album originally written by composer Stephen Schwartz. In a 2003 interview with Martin Bashir, Jackson admitted that he no longer remembered having recorded the song, and could not recall any of the lyrics.

Record World called Jackson's version a "beautiful ballad which he interprets superbly."

=== Charts ===
Chart performance for "With a Child's Heart"
Chart (1973)	Peak position
Turkey Top 20 Chart	13
US Billboard Hot 100	50
US Billboard Hot R&B/Hip-Hop Songs	14
US Cash Box Top 100	37

== Raven-Symoné version ==
"With a Child's Heart"

Single by Raven-Symoné

from the album Undeniable
- Released: February 20, 1999
- Recorded: 1998
- Length: 3:53
- Label: Crash Records
- Songwriters: Ray Blaze; Jerome Jefferson

Raven-Symoné singles chronology
"Raven Is the Flavor" (1993)	"With a Child's Heart" (1999)	"Grazing in the Grass" (2004)

"With a Child's Heart" was later covered by American singer Raven-Symoné, on her second studio album, Undeniable. It was included on an original R&B single with the same name written by Ray Blaze and Jerome Jefferson which was released in 1999. The "Ballad version" was the cover and the other versions were variations of the new song. Raven toured the United States going to various schools and malls to promote the single, and even went on a tour with *NSYNC.

Three music videos were made for the song: the first one used the "uptemp version", the second used the "ballad version", and the third used a remix. Despite the music videos and heavy promotion, the single never took off and failed to dent the charts.

=== CD single ===
1. "With a Child's Heart" (Uptempo version) – 3:53
2. "With a Child's Heart" (Ballad version) – 5:34
3. "With a Child's Heart" (Bonus Remix Uptempo version) – 3:38
4. "With a Child's Heart" (International Bonus House Mix) – 4:21
