= College Road Trip =

2008 American film directed by Roger Kumble

- Theatrical release poster
- Directed by: Roger Kumble
- Written by: Emi Mochizuki; Carrie Evans; Cinco Paul; Ken Daurio
- Produced by: Andrew Gunn
- Starring: Martin Lawrence; Raven-Symoné; Donny Osmond
- Cinematography: Theo van de Sande
- Edited by: Roger Bondelli
- Music by: Edward Shearmur
- Production companies: Walt Disney Pictures; Gunn Films
- Distributed by: Walt Disney Studios Motion Pictures
- Release date: March 7, 2008
- Running time: 83 minutes
- Country: United States
- Language: English
- Budget: $25 million
- Box office: $51.5 million

College Road Trip is a 2008 American family comedy film directed by Roger Kumble and starring Martin Lawrence, Raven-Symoné, and Donny Osmond. The film centers on college-bound teen Melanie Porter (Raven-Symoné), who goes on a road trip to different universities with her family, including her overprotective father. The film was released by Walt Disney Studios Motion Pictures in the United States on March 7, 2008. The film garnered negative reviews from critics and grossed $51.5 million against a $25 million budget.

== Plot ==
Melanie Porter, a 17-year-old college-bound girl, is preparing to graduate from high school and wants to go to Georgetown University. However, her father James Porter, the chief of police in the quiet Chicago suburb where they live, is overprotective of his family, including Melanie, and is not ready for her to leave and study so far away from home. James has other plans for Melanie; he wants her to go to Northwestern University which is only 28 minutes away from home. James also disagrees with his real estate agent wife Michelle, the family pig Albert, who continuously annoys him, and his young son Trey, who spends much time with the pig. Melanie is invited to an interview at Georgetown after a college recruiter sees her performance at a mock trial. Her two best friends, Nancy and Katie, offer to take her on their road trip to Pittsburgh, Melanie is set to go with her friends until her father surprises her with his own road trip to Washington, D.C.

On their way, Melanie reluctantly visits Northwestern to take a tour. They meet an overly optimistic father and daughter duo, Doug and Wendy, who are on their own road trip. James has planted actors at Northwestern, one screaming at Melanie after they lost an eye at Georgetown. Melanie almost falls for it until one of the actors says to her "Yeah, the chief's a pretty smart guy", since he never met James.

The Porters' car soon breaks down, and they find Trey in the trunk with Albert. They stop at a hotel (thanks to Albert's navigating), but Albert eats coffee beans and becomes hyperactive, leading to him crashing and ruining a wedding. They run into Doug and Wendy again, who offer James and Melanie a ride since James' car broke down. Later, Melanie and her father ride on a tour bus where they try to work out their differences. At one destination, Nancy and Katie show up and take Melanie to a sorority house. James, due to a misunderstanding, and the owner not letting him in to check on her, sneaks into the house. After hearing that his daughter has faith in him, he decides to leave the next morning. Unfortunately, after Melanie leaves, he gets caught, brutally tased, and arrested by the owner. James' mother comes to bail him out, scolds him for being overprotective, and opens up about her own past fears when her son went to the Army, but still believed in her son to go his own path. James and Melanie end up forgiving each other at the airport. After dropping off Trey, they skydive to make the interview at Georgetown.

Eventually, they land, but re-encounter the father of the bride at the crashed wedding, who starts chasing them in golf carts as revenge for ruining his daughter's wedding ceremony until they manage to lose him. Eventually, they succeed in making it to the interview at Georgetown just in the nick of time. However, Melanie starts to show fear, but James consoles her and encourages her to go in.

Later, Melanie is finally attending, with her parents sending her off, even meeting Doug and Wendy once again, where Wendy was being sent off to college as well.

At Thanksgiving, Melanie and Wendy return home to the Porters’ house for dinner, where the girls each introduce their friends, with James showing restrained anger at meeting Melanie's friend Tracy, who is a male. Wendy then introduces her friend Scooter, and reveals that they are getting married. Doug snaps in anger and tackles the boy, much to the shock of everyone else.

== Cast ==
- Martin Lawrence as Chief James Porter, an Army veteran and police chief of a small Illinois suburb. He is very overprotective of his family, but finally lets go of Melanie and allows her to live her life.
- Raven-Symoné as Melanie Porter, James & Michelle's daughter and a very bright young girl with aspirations to get into Georgetown.
- Donny Osmond as Doug Greenhut, an overly-energetic man who is taking his equally energetic daughter on a road trip. He stops to help James and Melanie when their car breaks down and initially freaks James out. However, in the end it is shown the families are friends as they are celebrating Thanksgiving together.
- Brenda Song as Nancy Carter, one of Melanie's friends
- Will Sasso as Deputy O'Mally, one of James' co-workers on the police force
- Eshaya Draper as Trey Porter, James & Michelle's son and Melanie's younger brother. He is very intellectually gifted beyond his age. He stows away on the trip with the family pig, Albert.
- Kym E. Whitley as Michelle Porter, James' wife and Melanie & Trey's mother
- Arnetia Walker as Grandma Porter, James' mother
- Margo Harshman as Katie, one of Melanie's friends
- Josh Meyers as Deputy Stuart, one of James' co-workers on the police force
- Michael Landes as Donny
- Lucas Grabeel as Scooter, a member of Melanie's graduating class and her intellectual rival. He behaves exactly like Doug and even gets engaged to his daughter in the end.
- Adam LeFevre as Judge
- Molly Ephraim as Wendy Greenhut, an energetic and chipper young woman who is on a college tour with her father and ends up befriending the Porters. At the end of the film she is engaged to Scooter.
- Vincent Pastore as Freddy
- Benjamin Patterson as Tracy
- Geneva Carr as Mrs. O'Mally, Deputy O'Mally's pregnant wife
- Julia Frisoli as Mrs. Greenhut, Doug's wife and Wendy's mother
- Kristian Kordula as Nick
- Joseph R. Gannascoli as Mr. Arcarra
- Kelly Coffield Park as Sorority House Mother
- Brianna Shea Russo as Ally

== Production ==
A scene for College Road Trip being filmed in Ridgefield, Connecticut

Cinco Paul and partner Ken Daurio wrote the most recent draft. The film was born out of the Disney Writers Program by Carrie Evans and Emi Mochizuki. The movie was produced by Andrew Gunn/Gunn Films and directed by Roger Kumble.

== Promotion ==
To promote the movie in the United States, Raven-Symoné appeared on WWE WrestleMania XXIV, Chelsea Lately, MTV's TRL, Live with Regis and Kelly, The View, BET's 106 & Park and The Oprah Winfrey Show. The theme song of the movie was "Double Dutch Bus", sung by Raven-Symoné. The music video for the song appeared on Disney Channel and was included in her self-titled album. The music video included scenes from the movie. Disney Channel TV spots were aired promoting the film in the United States.

The first trailer appeared alongside Mr. Magorium's Wonder Emporium and Enchanted.

The film did not receive a cinema release in Australia. Although promotions for the film aired on Disney Channel Australia, it failed to be released on August 7, 2008 as planned. The film was released direct-to-DVD instead.

== Release ==
=== Critical reception ===
The review aggregator at Rotten Tomatoes gives the film an approval rating of 13% based on 72 reviews, with an average rating of 3.3/10. The website's critical consensus reads, "Filled with shrill gags and middling slapstick, College Road Trip is woefully short on comic imagination." Metacritic gave the film a weighted average score of 34 out of 100, based on 46 critics, indicating "generally unfavorable" reviews. Audiences polled by CinemaScore gave the film an average grade of "A−" on an A+ to F scale.

The New York Times gathered positive reviews toward the leading cast's performance. 411 Mania gave it a final score of 7.5 out of 10 based on several reviews and managed to give it a positive DVD and film review. The film also received positive reviews from Blu-ray.com, Kansas City Star and several other publications including the Pittsburgh Post-Gazette. The film also received negative reviews from USA Today and San Francisco Chronicle.

=== Box office ===
In its opening weekend, the film grossed approximately $13.6 million in 2,706 theaters in the United States and Canada, ranking #2 at the box office. The movie continued on to gross $31,117,834 to finish off the month and closed with earnings above $45 million in domestic territories.

== Home media ==
The film was released on DVD and Blu-ray on July 15, 2008. Both the DVD and BD releases contain the following bonus features.

- Deleted scenes including alternate opening and ending
- "Double Dutch Bus" music video
- Audio commentary by director Roger Kumble, writers Carrie Evans and Emi Mochizuki, and stars
- Raven's Video Diary - Tag along on the set of the hot young stars from sensation Disney shows and movies
- On the Set: "Double Dutch Bus" - A behind-the-scenes look at the filming of the film's signature song
- Bloopers

College Road Trip sold 439,809 copies in the first week of release pulling in $8,030,648 of additional revenue for the franchise. It has sold a total of 1,004,834 copies since its release and made a total of $18,461,049 in DVD sales.

- Billboard Top DVD Sales: #2
- Billboard Top Video Rentals: #2

== Book ==
In May 2008, Disney Press released a book based on the movie written by Alice Alfonsi. The novel has the printed original movie poster as the cover.

== Awards and nominations ==
| Year | Award | Category | Result |
|---|---|---|---|
| 2008 | Teen Choice Award | "Choice Comedy Movie" | Nominated |
| 2008 | Golden Icon Awards/28th Golden Icon Awards | "Favourite Teen Movie" | Nominated |
| 2008 | Summer Fort Myers Beach Film Festival | "Favourite Summer Teen Flick Comedy" | Won |
| 2009 | Teen Film/TV Series International Awards | Best Actress: Lead Role on Comedy Film for Raven-Symoné | Won |
| 2009 | Teen Film/TV Series International Awards | Best Teen Film of the Year | Won |
| 2009 | Teen Film/TV Series International Awards | Best Comedy Film of the Year | Won |
