= Everlife =

American pop rock band

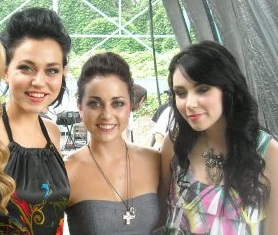

Background information
- Origin: Indiana, Pennsylvania
- Genres: Pop rock; power pop; CCM
- Years active: 2001–2013
- Labels: Independent; Tovah/Shelter; Walt Disney/Hollywood/Buena Vista; 97
- Members: Amber Hezlep (née Ross); Sarah Ross; Julia Ross
- Website: everlifeonline.com

Everlife was an American pop rock band made up of three sisters, Amber, Sarah, and Julia Ross which formed in early 2001.

== History ==
Everlife originated in Indiana, Pennsylvania. The band was formed in the winter of 1997 with Sarah on drums, Amber on guitar, and Julia on keyboard.

In 2002, Everlife and their mother, Susan, shared a song with the band members of Seventh Day Slumber. The band members of Seventh Day Slumber lent their expertise to Everlife by connecting them to music industry people in Nashville, Tennessee.

In 2003, Everlife relocated to Nashville, with their parents, where they signed a single album record deal with Independent Records, and released their debut album, Daydream: An Acoustic Album. Then in 2004, their A&R contact, Gary Chapman, guided them to secure their second record deal. They were signed with Tovah Records, in association with Crowne Music Group, and released their self-titled second album: Everlife. The song "I'm Over It" caught the attention of KMKI, AM 620, the Radio Disney Station in Dallas, Texas. Phil Guerini, an executive at Walt Disney Records, said he was impressed that Everlife has a unique sound and the girls play their own instruments.

The Buena Vista Music Group signed the sister singing sensation to Buena Vista Records and Hollywood Records. "Find Yourself in You", found prominent rotation nationwide on Radio Disney. They also sang the title song for the 2005 Disney original film, Go Figure. The Everlife album peaked at number 121 on the Billboard 200 chart.

They contributed songs to 12 Disney compilations, such as the Radio Disney Jams series and Disneymania. They were featured on four Disney film soundtracks and two Disney TV soundtracks. After leaving Buena Vista Records, they continued a strong relationship with Disney.

To celebrate Radio Disney's 10th Birthday Celebration, Disney held the "Totally 10 Birthday Concert" on July 22, 2006, where Everlife performed live, alongside Miley Cyrus, Aly & AJ, Bowling for Soup, Jesse McCartney, and the Cheetah Girls. They later opened for the Cheetah Girls' concert tour The Party's Just Begun Tour on the last few shows in 2007, and for Miley Cyrus on the last six dates of her Best of Both Worlds Tour, and the Jonas Brothers for their 2009 stop in Nashville. They have been on three tours of the Netherlands and the United Kingdom.

Everlife released their final album, At the End of Everything, in March 2013, before they officially disbanded to pursue solo careers.

== Discography ==
Albums
Daydream: An Acoustic Album
- Released: April 1, 2001
- Label: Independent Records
Everlife
- Released: August 24, 2004
- Label: Tovah, Shelter Records
Everlife
- Released: February 20, 2007
- Label: Hollywood Records, Buena Vista Records
- Chart peak:No. 121 (US)
At the End of Everything
- Released: March 15, 2013
- Label: 97 Records
- Official singles:
  - 2012: "Coming Home"
  - 2026: “Thin Ice Walking”

=== Soundtracks ===
- 2005 "Strangers Like Me" — from DisneyMania 3
- 2005 "I'm Over It" — from Radio Disney Jams, Vol. 7
- 2005 "Go Figure" — from Go Figure soundtrack
- 2005 "Strangers Like Me (Jungle Rock Remix)" — from DisneyRemixMania
- 2005 "Every Day Is Christmas" — from Radio Disney Jingle Jams
- 2006 "I Can See Clearly Now" — from That's So Raven Too!
- 2006 "Look Through My Eyes" — from DisneyMania 4
- 2006 "Real Wild Child" (feat. The Westside Girls) — from The Wild soundtrack
- 2006 "Don't Be Cruel" — Leroy & Stitch (movie only, no album was released)
- 2006 "Find Yourself in You" — from Hannah Montana soundtrack
- 2006 "I Could Get Used To This" — from Radio Disney Jams 9
- 2006 "Find Yourself in You" — from Radio Disney Jams 9
- 2007 "Reflection" — from DisneyMania 5
- 2007 "Look Through My Eyes" — from Bridge to Terabithia soundtrack
- 2007 "Find Yourself in You" - from Bring It On: In It to Win It
- 2008 "Angels Cry" — from Songs of Breakaway - Vol. 2 soundtrack

=== EP ===
- 2009 At the Love Library (Acoustic EP)
- 2010 What's Beautiful EP

=== Tours ===
- "Radio Disney Jingle Jams Tour" (2005) B5 (Head Liner), Everlife, and SAVVY (Berto Ornelas Now Knows as MANNIE B, Sarah LeMaire Now Known as Gigi, Drew Reinartz, Lauryn Story-Witt, Andrew Stern, Alan Shaw, Mariah Mcbride, and Nikki Frishber)
