= Everlife (2004 album) =

Studio album by Everlife
- Released: August 24, 2004
- Recorded: 2002–2004
- Studios: Jupiter Studios (Seattle, Washington); Oxford Sound and Pentavarit (Nashville, Tennessee)
- Genres: Christian rock; pop rock
- Labels: Tovah; Shelter
- Producers: Kevan Cyka; Dan Needham

Everlife chronology
Daydream: An Acoustic Album (2001)	Everlife (2004)	Everlife (2007)

Singles from Everlife
- 1. "Evidence"; 2. "Heaven Open Your Eyes"; 3. "I'm Over It"

Everlife is the second studio album by Everlife. It was released on August 24, 2004.

It was the band's second studio album on Tovah/Shelter Records and was distributed by Word Distribution.

== Promotion ==
Three promotional singles were released from the album: "Evidence", "Heaven Open Your Eyes", and "I'm Over It". The latter was included on the compilation Radio Disney Jams Vol. 7.

== Track listing ==
All tracks are written by Amber Ross, Sarah Ross, Julia Ross, Dan Needham, and Kevan Cyka, except where noted.

Everlife track listing
No.	Title	Writer(s)	Length
1.	"Heaven Open Your Eyes"		3:24
2.	"Take a Ride"	A. Ross; S. Ross; J. Ross; Needham; Cyka; Tony Palacios; Jon Fulton Wilkerson	3:43
3.	"I'm Over It"		3:33
4.	"Evidence"		4:08
5.	"Lead the Way"	A. Ross; S. Ross; J. Ross; Needham; Cyka; Chris Omartian	3:47
6.	"Save Me"		4:22
7.	"Even When"		3:10
8.	"Set Me Free"	A. Ross; J. Ross; S. Ross; Needham; Cyka; Linda Elias	3:09
9.	"Getting Closer"	A. Ross; S. Ross; J. Ross; Needham; Cyka; Lynn Nichols; Jadyn Maria	3:49
10.	"Angels Cry"		4:02

== Personnel ==
Everlife

- Amber Ross – vocals
- Julia Ross – vocals
- Sarah Ross – vocals

Musicians

- Dan Needham – keyboards, Wurlitzer electric piano, programming, electric guitars, acoustic guitar, hi-strung guitar, drums
- Gary Burnette – electric guitars
- Trey Hill – electric guitars
- Joey Canaday – bass
- Kevan Cyka – vocalisms
- John Schlitt – guest vocals (2)

=== Production ===
- David Epstein – executive producer
- Kevan Cyka – producer, A&R direction
- Dan Needham – producer, recording, mixing (6)
- Steve Bishir – drum recording, bass recording
- Shane D. Wilson – mixing (1–5, 7–10)
- Lee Bridges – Pro Tools editing at Sound Stage Studios (Nashville, Tennessee)
- Richard Dodd – mastering
- Michael Turner – marketing direction
- Natasha Maciuk – project coordinator
- Jacob Hubbard – administrative assistant
- Sarah Ross – production assistant
- Gary Chapman – creative director
- Annette Reischl – design, layout
- Allen Clark – photography
- Todd White for Mike Atkins Management – management
