= At the Love Library =

EP by Everlife
- Released: April 28, 2009
- Genre: Acoustic, pop rock, pop punk

Everlife chronology
Everlife (2007)	At the Love Library (2009)	At the End of Everything (2013)

At the Love Library is the debut extended play and the first acoustic extended play by Everlife. The album was released on April 28, 2009, and consists of 4 songs.

== Track listing ==
1. "Resistance"
2. "Goodbye" (Acoustic version, from the third studio album Everlife, by Everlife)
3. "Attention"
4. "Where You Are" (Acoustic version, from the third studio album Everlife, by Everlife)
