= WMOT Records =

WMOT (We Men of Talent) Records, an independent recording company in Philadelphia, produced a series of singles and albums in the "Philadelphia sound" soul tradition (see Philadelphia soul). The company was founded by Alan Rubens and Steve Bernstein in 1973.

The biggest selling record produced by WMOT was "Double Dutch Bus" by Frankie Smith, which hit number one on the Billboard soul chart (#30, pop) in 1982 and sold more than 2 million copies. Other gold hits were recorded by Major Harris with "Love Won't Let Me Wait" (#1 R&B, #5 pop, 1975) and their first signing, Blue Magic, who had a string of R&B and pop hits in the mid-70s, including "Sideshow", (#1 R&B, #8 pop), in 1974. Other WMOT artists included Count Coolout, Barbara Mason, Captain Sky, Brandi Wells, David Simmons, Funk Fusion Band, Bliss, Impact (which featured former Temptations member Damon Harris), Heaven and Earth, Sweet Thunder, and Fat Larry's Band. The label also produced "It's Good To Be The King" by actor/comedian/director Mel Brooks in 1981.

From its beginning, Atlantic Records distributed WMOT's releases, mainly on its Atco subsidiary, but in 1978, Fantasy Records took over distribution as Fantasy / WMOT Records. In 1980, it began distributing independently. During that same period, the label was distributed in certain European markets such as France, Belgium and the Netherlands by French record company Vogue.

In 1981, the label and company was sold to Michael Goldberg, Allen Cohen, and Jeff and Mark Salvarian. Two years later, Larry Lavin bought a stake in WMOT and it was his activity in the company that led to lawsuits over money laundering that brought the company down in 1984. Its back catalog was sold to CBS (now Sony Music). Later in 1985, Steve Bernstein launched Omni Records in Philadelphia with an immediate success, Jean Carn's "Closer Than Close", which was a #1 R&B hit.
