= That's So Raven Too! =

Soundtrack album by Raven-Symoné and various artists
- Released: March 7, 2006
- Genres: Pop; R&B
- Length: 49:30
- Label: Walt Disney
- Producers: Raven-Symoné; Matthew Gerrard; Marco Marinangeli; Daniel Cage; French; Dani Markman

Singles from That's So Raven Too!
- 1. "Some Call It Magic" Released: January 25, 2006; 2. "Little by Little (Remix)" Released: March 7, 2006

That's So Raven Too! is the second soundtrack album from the hit Disney Channel original series, That's So Raven. The soundtrack debuted and peaked at #44, on the Billboard 200, selling 22,600 copies in its first week. Since then, the soundtrack has sold 200,000 copies (as of 2007). The soundtrack includes the single "Some Call it Magic" by Raven-Symoné. The album also features songs from other artists such as Jesse McCartney, B5, Everlife, Anneliese van der Pol, Orlando Brown, Aretha Franklin, and Aly & AJ.

Professional ratings
Review scores
| Source | Rating |
|---|---|
| AllMusic | 3/5 stars |

== Track listing ==
| No. | Title | Writer(s) | Recording Artist(s) | Length |
|---|---|---|---|---|
| 1. | "Some Call It Magic" | Raven-Symoné; Matthew Gerrard; Robbie Nevil | Raven-Symoné | 3:09 |
| 2. | "Friends" | Raven-Symoné; Matthew Gerrard; Robbie Nevil | Raven-Symoné and Anneliese van der Pol | 3:17 |
| 3. | "Little By Little" | Raven-Symoné; Matthew Gerrard; Robbie Nevil; Orlando Brown | Raven-Symoné and Orlando Brown | 3:26 |
| 4. | "Jump In" | Raven-Symoné; Mathew Gerrard; Robbie Nevil; Jay Condiotti | Raven-Symoné | 3:52 |
| 5. | "She's No You" (Neptunes Remix) | Jesse McCartney; Matthew Gerrard; Robbie Nevil | Jesse McCartney | 3:08 |
| 6. | "Walking on Sunshine" | Kimberly Rew | Aly & AJ | 3:56 |
| 7. | "Let's Groove" | Maurice White; Wayne Vaughn | B5 | 3:36 |
| 8. | "Let's Stick Together" | Raven-Symoné; Matthew Gerrard; Robbie Nevil | Raven-Symoné, Anneliese van der Pol and Kyle Massey | 3:27 |
| 9. | "A Day in the Sun" | Matthew Gerrard; Charlie Midnight | Anneliese van der Pol | 3:31 |
| 10. | "I Can See Clearly Now" | Johnny Nash | Everlife | 3:13 |
| 11. | "Will It Go Round in Circles" | B. Preston; B. Fisher | Orlando Brown | 3:07 |
| 12. | "This Is My Time" (Remix) | Raven-Symoné; Matthew Gerrard; Robbie Nevil | Raven-Symoné | 3:42 |
| 13. | "Respect" | Otis Redding | Aretha Franklin | 2:24 |
| 14. | "Supernatural" (Too! Mix) | Matthew Gerrard; Michelle Lewis | Raven-Symoné | 2:46 |
| 15. | "Some Call It Magic" (B.F.F. Mix) | Raven-Symoné; Matthew Gerrard; Robbie Nevil | Raven-Symoné | 3:00 |

iTunes bonus tracks
| No. | Title | Writer(s) | Recording Artist(s) | Length |
|---|---|---|---|---|
| 16. | "Little By Little" (Remix) | Raven-Symoné; Matthew Gerrard; Robbie Nevil; Orlando Brown | Raven-Symoné and Orlando Brown | 3:26 |

=== Notes ===
- "Walking on Sunshine" is a cover, originally performed by Katrina and the Waves.
- "A Day in the Sun" is a cover, originally performed by Hilary Duff on her Metamorphosis album (Japanese version).
- "I Can See Clearly Now" is a cover, originally performed by Johnny Nash.
- "Will It Go Round in Circles" is a cover, originally performed by Billy Preston.
- "Let's Groove" is a cover of an Earth, Wind, And Fire song.

== Charts ==
| Chart | Peak position | Sales |
|---|---|---|
| U.S. Billboard 200 | 44 | 200,000+ (as of April 2007) |
| U.S. Billboard Top Kid Audio | 3 | 200,000+ (as of April 2007) |
| U.S. Billboard Top Soundtracks | 4 | 200,000+ (as of April 2007) |
