= That's So Raven (soundtrack) =

2004 soundtrack album by Raven-Symoné and various artists

Soundtrack album by Raven-Symoné and various artists
- Released: May 18, 2004
- Genres: Pop; R&B
- Length: 48:53
- Label: Walt Disney
- Producers: Matthew Gerrard; Christopher B. Pearman; Ray Cham; Cutfather; Def Jef; Des'ree; Andy Dodd; Dr. Luke; Mattias Gustafsson; Mark Hammond; Ashley Ingram; Dave Katz; Arif Mardin; Harvey Mason Jr.; David Paich; Marty Paich; Mike Simpson; Damon Thomas; Adam Watts; Jay Landers (exec.); Elliot Lurie (exec.)

Singles from That's So Raven
- 1. "Supernatural" Released: May 18, 2004

That's So Raven is the soundtrack album to the Disney Channel original series of the same name. The album includes songs sung by the show's star, Raven-Symoné and its theme song. The album debuted and peaked at #44 on the Billboard 200 and has been certified Gold by the RIAA for sales of 500,000 copies.

== Critical reception ==
Professional ratings
Review scores
Source	Rating
AllMusic	3/5 stars
ParentCenter	(mixed)

A mixed review by the ParentCenter Family Entertainment Guide called the album both "fun" and "predictable".

== Track listing ==
No.	Title	Writer(s)	Recording Artist(s)	Length
1.	"Supernatural"	Matthew Gerrard, Michelle Lewis	Raven-Symoné	2:58
2.	"Shine"	Ray Cham, Charlene Licera	Raven-Symoné	3:07
3.	"Beautiful Soul"	Andy Dodd, Adam Watts	Jesse McCartney	3:55
4.	"Got to Be Real"	David Foster, David Paich, Lynda Smith	Cheryl Lynn	3:49
5.	"(There's Gotta Be) More to Life"	Sabelle Breer, Kevin Kadish, Harvey Mason Jr., Damon Thomas, Lucy Woodward	Stacie Orrico	3:22
6.	"We Are Family"	Bernard Edwards, Nile Rodgers	Jump5	3:40
7.	"Superstar"	Joe Belmaati, Michael Hansen, Marchell Remeeus	Jamelia	3:35
8.	"Ultimate"	Robert Ellis Orrall, Jeff Coplan	Lindsay Lohan	3:07
9.	"You Gotta Be"	Ashley Ingram, Desirée Weekes	Des'ree	4:06
10.	"I'm Every Woman"	Nickolas Ashford, Valerie Simpson	Chaka Khan	4:08
11.	"Where You Belong"	Dana Calitri, Mattias Gustafsson, Nina Ossoff	Huckapoo	3:23
12.	"Jungle Boogie"	Ronald Bell, Kool & the Gang	Kool & the Gang	3:05
13.	"Future Is Clear"	Jimmy Harry, Elliot Lurie	Jeannie Ortega	3:00
14.	"That's So Raven! (Theme Song)"	John Coda	Raven-Symoné, Orlando Brown, Anneliese van der Pol	0:51
15.	"Supernatural" (Crystal Ball Mix)	Gerrard, Lewis	Raven-Symoné	2:49

== Charts ==
Chart	Peak position
Canadian Albums Chart	18
U.S. Billboard 200	44
U.S. Billboard Top Kid Audio	1
U.S. Billboard Top R&B/Hip-Hop Albums	54
U.S. Billboard Top Soundtracks	2

== Certifications ==
Region	Certification	Certified units/sales
United States (RIAA)	Gold	500,000^{^}
^{^} Shipments figures based on certification alone.

== Disney Karaoke Series ==
Disney Karaoke Series: That's So Raven

Compilation album (Karaoke) by Various artists
- Released: March 1, 2005 (U.S.)
- Genre: Pop
- Label: Walt Disney
- Producers: Ted Kryczko (executor), Steven Morrell (associate producer)

The Disney Karaoke Series: That's So Raven is a karaoke album featuring songs from the Disney series That's So Raven.

=== Track listing ===
1. "Supernatural"
2. "Shine"
3. "We Are Family"
4. "Ultimate"
5. "(There's Gotta Be) More to Life"
6. "Jungle Boogie"
7. "You Gotta Be"
8. "That's So Raven (Theme Song)"
9. "Supernatural"
10. "Shine" (vocal)
11. "We Are Family" (vocal)
12. "Ultimate" (vocal)
13. "(There's Gotta Be) More to Life" (vocal)
14. "Jungle Boogie" (vocal)
15. "You Gotta Be" (vocal)
16. "That's So Raven (Theme Song)" (vocal)
