= Undeniable (Raven-Symoné album) =

Studio album by Raven-Symoné
- Released: May 4, 1999
- Recorded: 1998–1999
- Genres: R&B; hip hop
- Length: 48:21
- Labels: Crash; RayBlaize
- Producers: Paul K. Walker, Rogelio "Roger" Wilson, Tony Williams

Raven-Symoné chronology
Here's to New Dreams (1993)	Undeniable (1999)	This Is My Time (2004)

Alternative cover
- From Then Until

Singles from Undeniable
- 1. "With a Child's Heart" Released: February 20, 1999

Professional ratings
Review scores
Source	Rating
Allmusic	2.5/5 stars
BET	3/5 stars

Undeniable is the second studio album by American singer Raven-Symoné. The album was released independently on May 4, 1999, and as of February 2007 has sold over 2,000 copies. On October 31, 2006, the album was reissued by TMG Records, retitled From Then Until.

== Background ==
After the lack of success with her debut, Here's to New Dreams, Raven was dropped from MCA Records in 1994. After a short break, she co-founded RayBlaize Records with her father, Christopher Pearman in 1996, and signed a deal with Crash Records in 1997. The song "Pure Love" was written by first season American Idol contestant EJay Day, and the song "I Love You" was written by Stevie Wonder. The album features the single "With a Child's Heart", also a Stevie Wonder song. The album sold over 2,000 copies.

On October 31, 2006, the album was reissued as From Then Until by TMG Records with an alternate tracklist and cover art. The reissue managed to outsell the original by a wide margin, having sold 8,000 copies by February 2007.

== Promotion ==
Raven-Symoné was an opening act for 'N Sync's first tour, the 1998-1999 'N SYNC Tour. One single was released, "With a Child's Heart", a Stevie Wonder song. It spawned three music videos, one for each version of the song.

== Track listing ==
Undeniable

1. "With a Child's Heart (Uptempo Version)" (Blaze, Jefferson) – 3:53
2. "I Can Get Down" (Blaize, Jefferson, Ray Blaze) – 4:01
3. "Hip Hoppers" (Holt, Jefferson) – 4:18
4. "Slow Down" (Jefferson) – 4:52
5. "Best Friends" (Jerome "Rome" Jefferson, Pierce La Kindra, Raven-Symoné) – 4:18
6. "People Make the World Go Round" (Thom Bell, Linda Creed) – 4:15
7. "Bounce" (Jefferson) – 4:41
8. "I Love You" (Wonder) – 4:51
9. "Lean on Me" (Blaize, Jefferson, Ray Blaze) – 4:07
10. "With a Child's Heart (Ballad Version)" (Vickie Basemore, Henry Cosby, Silvia Moore) – 5:34
11. "Pure Love" (Day, Rogers, Sawyer, Smith) – 3:31
12. "With a Child's Heart (Bonus Remix Uptempo Version)" (Blaze, Jefferson) – 3:38
13. "With a Child's Heart (International Bonus House Mix)" (Blaze, Jefferson) – 4:21

From Then Until

1. "People Make the World Go Round" – 3:48
2. "Best Friends" – 4:16
3. "Slow Down" – 4:26
4. "Hip Hoppers" – 4:04
5. "I Can Get Down" – 2:31
6. "Bounce" – 3:18
7. "With a Child's Heart" (Uptempo) – 3:54
8. "I Love You" – 4:51
9. "Lean on Me" – 2:42
10. "With a Child's Heart" (Ballad Version) – 5:34
11. "Pure Love" (International Remix) – 3:29
12. "With a Child's Heart" (International House Mix) – 1:58
13. "Big Thangz" – 1:39
14. "Incomplete" – 1:29
15. "Ear Candy" – 0:51
