= That's What Little Girls Are Made Of =

Single by Raven-Symoné

from the album Here's to New Dreams
- Released: April 15, 1993
- Recorded: 1992
- Genre: Hip-hop; R&B
- Length: 3:15
- Label: MCA
- Songwriters: Chad Elliott; Melissa Elliott
- Producers: Dr. Ceuss; Missy Elliott

Raven-Symoné singles chronology
| "That's What Little Girls Are Made Of" (1993) | "Raven Is the Flavor" (1993) |

Missy Elliott singles chronology
| "That's What Little Girls Are Made Of" (1993) | "Ooh, Ooh Baby" (1996) |

"That's What Little Girls Are Made Of" is the debut mainstream single by American actress and singer Raven-Symoné, taken from her debut album, Here's to New Dreams (1992). The single was released in April 1993 by MCA Records and is Raven-Symoné's highest chart appearance to date, peaking at numbers 68 and 73 on the US Billboard Hot 100 and Cash Box Top 100.

The song was written and produced by Missy Elliott, who performs a verse of scat singing and Jamaican-style toasting, but the music video featured a thinner, light-skinned actress lip syncing her part. On Behind the Music, Elliott reveals that she was not informed of the video shoot and later told she "didn't quite fit the image that we were looking for"—later taking her revenge with an oversized garbage-bag costume in her groundbreaking 1997 video "The Rain (Supa Dupa Fly)." Despite the setback, Elliott and Raven-Symoné have expressed respect for each other on Twitter.

== Track listing ==
- 12-inch
1. "That's What Little Girls Are Made Of" — 3:15
- Cassette
1. "That's What Little Girls Are Made Of"— 3:15
- Vinyl, 12-inch
1. "That's What Little Girls Are Made Of" (Extended Dub Remix) — 5:25
2. "That's What Little Girls Are Made Of" (Bogle Mix) — 3:52
3. "That's What Little Girls Are Made Of" (Raggamuffin Dub Semi-Instrumental) — 3:56
- CD Single, Vinyl, 12-inch, Promo
1. "That's What Little Girls Are Made Of" (Album Version) — 5:25
2. "That's What Little Girls Are Made Of" (Album Dub Version) — 3:52
3. "That's What Little Girls Are Made Of" (Dub Remix Radio Edit) — 5:28
4. "That's What Little Girls Are Made Of" (Boogie Mix) — 3:52
5. "That's What Little Girls Are Made Of" (Extended Dub Instrumental) — 5:27
6. "That's What Little Girls Are Made Of" (Raggamuffin Dub Semi-instrumental) — 3:56

== Charts ==
Weekly chart performance for "That's What Little Girls Are Made Of"
| Chart (1993) | Peak position |
|---|---|
| US Billboard Hot 100 | 68 |
| US Dance Singles Sales (Billboard) | 43 |
| US Hot R&B/Hip-Hop Songs (Billboard) | 47 |
| US Rhythmic Airplay (Billboard) | 39 |
| US Cash Box Top 100 | 73 |
