= Here's to New Dreams =

Studio album by Raven-Symoné
- Released: June 22, 1993
- Recorded: 1992–1993
- Genres: Hip hop; R&B
- Length: 40:03
- Label: MCA
- Producers: Melissa "Missy" Elliott; Chad "Dr. Seuss" Elliott; Steve Kelly; Kenny "K-Smoove" Kornegay

Raven-Symoné chronology
Here's to New Dreams (1993)	Undeniable (1999)

Singles from Here's to New Dreams
- 1. "That's What Little Girls Are Made Of" Released: April 15, 1993; 2. "Raven Is the Flavor" Released: November 2, 1993

Professional ratings
Review scores
Source	Rating
AllMusic	2/5 stars
Robert Christgau	(choice cut)

Here's to New Dreams is the debut album by the American actress and singer Raven-Symoné. It was released on June 22, 1993 by MCA Records.

== Background ==
Raven signed to MCA Records at the age of 5 (which made her the youngest artist ever signed to a label), but did not release the album until she was 7 years old. The album has sold 73,000 copies to date. According to the thank yous within the liner notes, she was signed to MCA Records by Wendy Credle and received vocal training lessons from collaborators Shyheim and Missy Elliott, who was then credited as Melissa Elliott.

=== Promotion ===
The song "That's What Little Girls Are Made Of" was the first single written/produced by Melissa "Missy" Elliott. "Raven Is the Flavor" was also released as a single.

== Track listing ==
No.	Title	Writer(s)	Length
1.	"That's What Little Girls Are Made Of" (featuring Missy Elliott)	Chad "Dr. Ceuss" Elliott; Melissa Elliott	3:22
2.	"First Day of School"	RNS; Shyheim Dionel Franklin	3:29
3.	"Hip Hop Teddybear"	Craig Jones; Kenny "K-Smoove" Kornegay	3:56
4.	"Raven Is the Flavor"	Bradley Young; Dow Brain; Peter Bazile; S.D. Franklin	3:46
5.	"Ooh Boy"	Christopher B. Pearman; Lafayette Summers	5:07
6.	"Fun Tonight"	Bradley Young; Dow Brain; Marie "Free" Wright; Peter Bazile	4:26
7.	"Betcha' Didn't Know" (featuring Missy Elliott)	Bradley Young; Dow Brain; Marie Wright; Melissa Elliott (uncredited); Peter Bazile	4:10
8.	"Raven's Lullaby"	Alim Muhammed; Christopher B. Pearman	4:08
9.	"Here's to New Dreams"	Christopher B. Pearman; Lafayette Summers	4:10
10.	"That's What Little Girls Are Made Of" (Dub Mix)	Chad "Dr. Ceuss" Elliott; Melissa Elliott	3:20

== Singles ==
=== "Raven Is the Flavor" ===
"Raven Is the Flavor" is the second single from the album.

==== Track listing ====
CD Single

1. "Onele Is the Flavor" (Main Mix)
2. "Raven Is the Flavor" (Album Version)

Vinyl, 12", Promo

1. "Raven Is the Flavor" (Main Mix)
2. "Raven Is the Flavor" (Album Version)
3. "Raven Is the Flavor" (Main Mix)
4. "Raven Is the Flavor" (Album Version)
