= Raven-Symoné =

American actress and singer (born 1985)

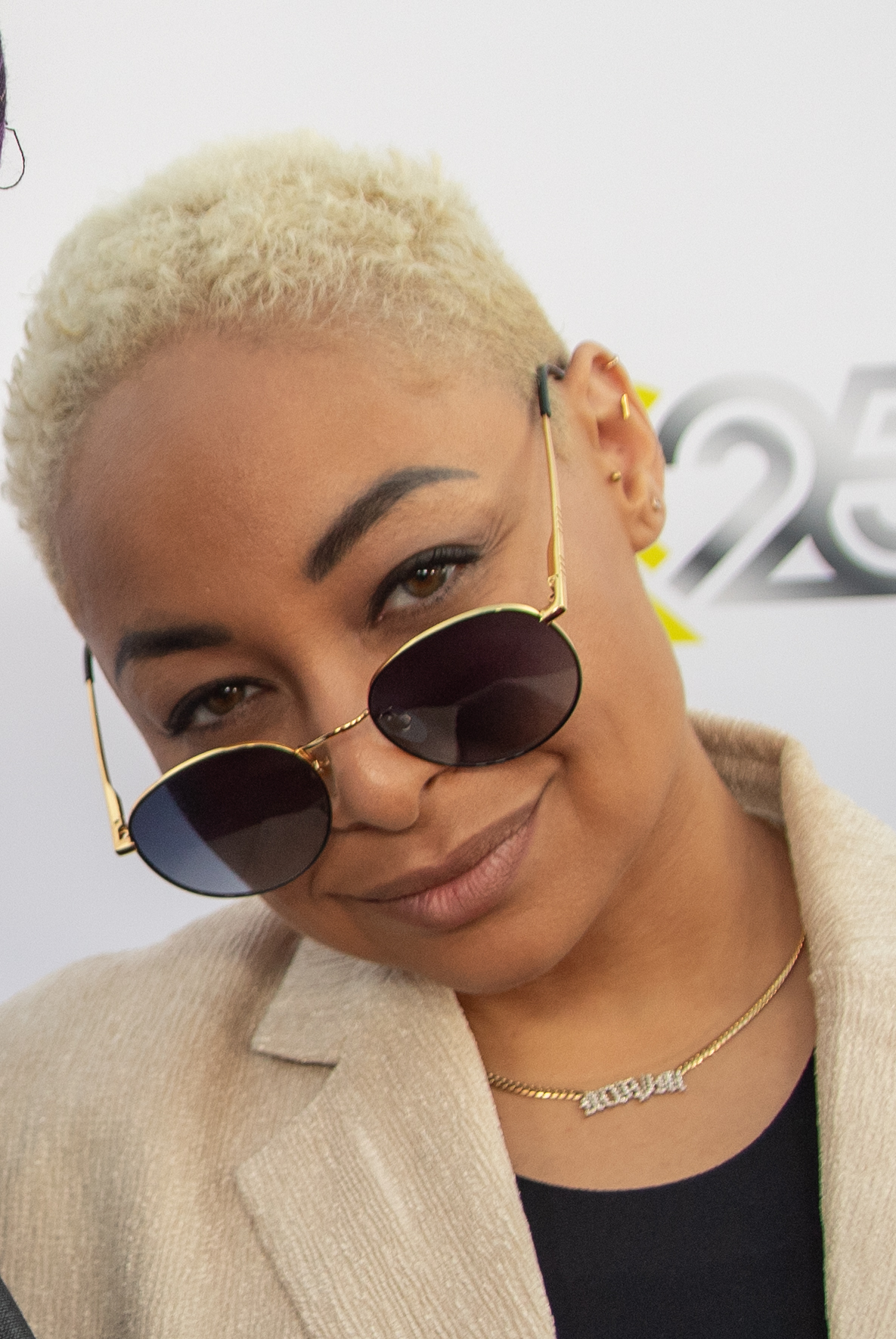
- Raven-Symoné in 2023
- Born: Raven-Symoné Christina Pearman; December 10, 1985 (age 40); Atlanta, Georgia, U.S.
- Other name: Raven
- Education: Academy of Art University (AA)
- Occupations: Actress; singer; songwriter; director; producer; television personality
- Years active: 1989–present
- Spouse: Miranda Maday (m. 2020)
- Awards: Full list
- Musical career
- Origin: Ossining, New York, U.S.
- Genres: R&B; hip hop
- Instrument: Vocals
- Labels: MCA; Walt Disney; Crash; RayBlaze; Hollywood
- Formerly of: The Cheetah Girls

Raven-Symoné (Note: Pronounced /sɪˈmoʊn/ sim-OHN or /sɪˈmoʊn(j)eɪ/ sim-OH-n(y)ay.) Christina Pearman-Maday (née Pearman; born December 10, 1985), also known as simply Raven, is an American actress, singer, and director. She has received several accolades, including five NAACP Image Awards, two Kids' Choice Awards, three Young Artist Awards, and five Emmy Award nominations. In 2012, she was included on VH1's list of "100 Greatest Child Stars of All Time".

Raven-Symoné began her career as a child actress, rising to fame as Olivia Kendall on The Cosby Show (1989–1992) and Nicole Lee on Hangin' with Mr. Cooper (1993–1997). When she was 17 years old, her fame was heightened when she landed the title role of Raven Baxter on the Disney Channel television series That's So Raven (2003–2007), for which she earned numerous awards; she reprised the role on the spin-off series Raven's Home (2017–2023), in which she also executive produced. Her film credits include Dr. Dolittle (1998), its sequel Dr. Dolittle 2 (2001), The Princess Diaries 2 (2004), College Road Trip (2008), and Mighty Oak (2020) while her television film credits include Zenon: Girl of the 21st Century (1999), its second sequel Zenon: Z3 (2004), The Cheetah Girls (2003), its sequel The Cheetah Girls 2 (2006), For One Night (2006), and Revenge of the Bridesmaids (2010). She also voiced Monique in the animated series Kim Possible (2002–2007), and Iridessa in the fantasy film franchise Tinker Bell. Symoné has also directed episodes for several series, including Raven's Home, Bunk'd, Sydney to the Max, Pretty Freekin Scary, and The Ms. Pat Show.

Raven-Symoné released her debut studio album at the age of seven, Here's to New Dreams (1993), which saw the moderate commercial success of the single "That's What Little Girls Are Made Of". She subsequently released the studio albums Undeniable (1999), This Is My Time (2004), and Raven-Symoné (2008). She also contributed vocals to several soundtracks from her Disney projects, including The Cheetah Girls (2003), That's So Raven (2004), That's So Raven Too! (2006), and The Cheetah Girls 2 (2006), several of which were certified platinum and gold. She made her Broadway debut in the musical Sister Act in 2012 and was a co-host of the ABC daytime talk show The View from 2015 to 2016, for which she earned two Emmy nominations. She hosted and executive produced the pilot of the 2021 reality show What Not to Design and hosted the 2024 revival of the game show Scrabble on The CW until she was replaced as host by Craig Ferguson in January 2026.

== Early life ==
Raven-Symoné was born on December 10, 1985, in Atlanta, Georgia, to Lydia (née Gaulden) and Christopher Pearman. She had a younger brother, Blaize, who died in November 2023. Her father Christopher died in October 2024.

As an infant, she worked for Atlanta's Young Faces Inc. modelling agency and was featured in local print advertisements. At the age of two, she worked with Ford Models in New York City and appeared in ads for Ritz crackers, Jell-O, Fisher-Price, and Cool Whip. At age three, she moved with her family to Ossining, New York, where she attended Park School.

== Career ==
=== 1989–2001: Child acting and early music releases ===
In 1989, Raven-Symoné auditioned for a role in the Bill Cosby film, Ghost Dad. At the age of three, she was considered too young for the role, but Cosby liked her so much that he found a role for her on his show, The Cosby Show, as his step-granddaughter Olivia. She made her debut in the premiere episode of the show's sixth season and remained until the series finale in 1992. She then appeared as the younger version of Halle Berry's starring character, a headstrong biracial enslaved woman, in the TV movie Alex Haley's Queen.

In 1992, Raven-Symoné began her singing career at the age of seven, when she signed with MCA Records. She spent that year and the next taking vocal lessons from Missy Elliott. Her debut album, Here's to New Dreams, was released on June 22, 1993, which spawned two singles: "That's What Little Girls Are Made Of" and "Raven Is the Flavor". "That's What Little Girls Are Made Of" reached No. 68 on the Billboard Hot 100. The album, however, was not successful, and, due to low sales, she was dropped from MCA Records in 1995. The album sold over 73,000 copies in the US.

In 1993, one year after The Cosby Show ended, Raven-Symoné landed the role of Nicole Lee, Mark's preteen cousin on the sitcom Hangin' with Mr. Cooper. She made her debut in the first episode of the show's second season and remained until the series finale in 1997. In 1994, during her time on the show Hangin' with Mr. Cooper, she had her first film role in The Little Rascals, playing Stymie's girlfriend.

In 1996, Raven-Symoné and her father founded RayBlaze Records, in which she signed a distribution deal with Crash Records for her second album Undeniable, which was released in May 1999. The album sold over 2,000 units in the US. The album yielded one single: a cover of Stevie Wonder's "With a Child's Heart". To support Undeniable, she went on tour as the opening act for Jive artist 'N Sync's "The 'N Sync Tour" in 1998/1999.

In 1998, she was cast in the Eddie Murphy comedy Dr. Dolittle, as Charisse Dolittle, the oldest daughter of Murphy's character. In 1999, she appeared in Zenon: Girl of the 21st Century as Nebula, her first production under Disney. In 2001, she reprised the role of Charisse Dolittle in Dr. Dolittle 2. In the same year, she participated in two episodes of the comedy series, My Wife and Kids as Charmaine, Claire's pregnant friend under ABC.

=== 2002–2007: That's So Raven, The Cheetah Girls, and This Is My Time ===
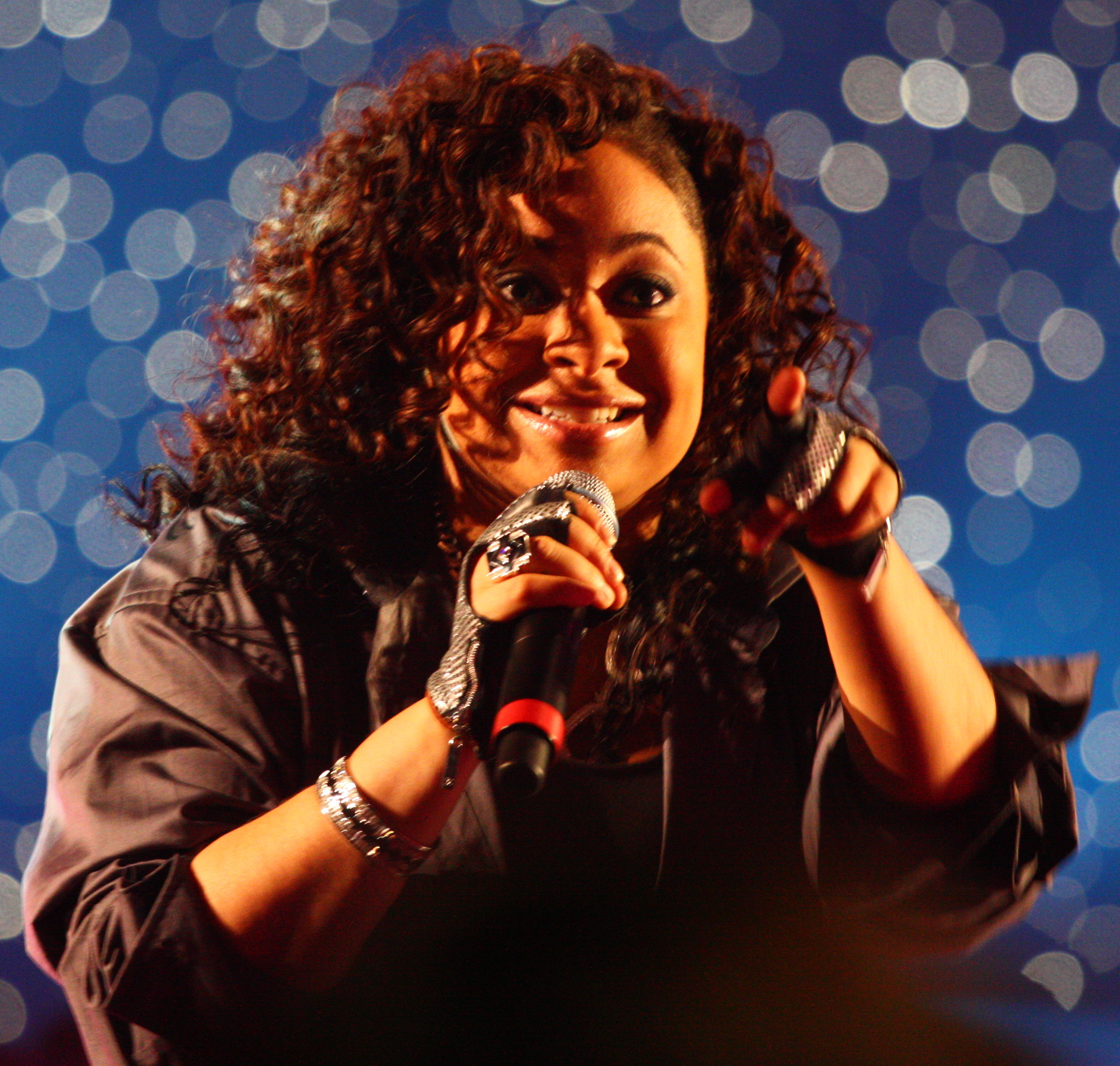
Symoné performing at the Disson Skating & Gymnastics Spectacular in 2008

In 2001, Raven-Symoné auditioned for a role on an upcoming series for the Disney Channel titled Absolutely Psychic, about a teenager with psychic abilities. During development the series was reworked to feature Raven-Symoné as the lead, and its title was changed to That’s So Raven. The series debuted on January 17, 2003, and ended on November 10, 2007 - becoming the channel's highest-rated and longest-running series at 100 episodes (until it was surpassed by Wizards of Waverly Place in October 2011). It spawned a franchise including soundtracks, dolls, episode DVDs, and video games. That's So Raven was nominated for Outstanding Children's Program during the 2005 and 2007 Emmy Awards. Merchandise for the show earned over $400 million. The show also launched the channel's first live action spin-off series, Cory in the House.

In 2002, Raven-Symoné was given the recurring voice role of Monique on Kim Possible. She also participated in the two films for the series, Kim Possible: A Sitch in Time (2003) and Kim Possible: So the Drama (2005). In 2003, she starred as lead singer Galleria Garibaldi in The Cheetah Girls, a Disney Channel Original Movie. The film was directed by Oz Scott and produced by Whitney Houston. It attracted more than 6.5 million viewers opening night, making it (at the time) Disney Channel's most-watched movie and highest-rated Disney Channel broadcast of 2003. The film soundtrack, The Cheetah Girls, debuted at No. 33 on the Billboard Top 200 and was certified Double Platinum by the RIAA for sales of 2 million copies. Following the success of the film, Disney began developing The Cheetah Girls as a real-life recording group, but Symoné opted to focus on solo projects. A TV show based on The Cheetah Girls was pitched to the ABC network, but it was never picked up as a series due to Raven-Symoné having prior commitments with That's So Raven. In 2003, she recorded the Stevie Wonder song "Superstition" as the main theme for the film The Haunted Mansion. She signed a deal with Hollywood Records, a Disney-owned label.

On September 21, 2004, she released her third studio album, This Is My Time, which included the single "Backflip". This Is My Time debuted at number 50 on the U.S. Billboard Top R&B/Hip-Hop Albums chart and at number fifty-one on the official Billboard 200. It had first week sales of 19,000 copies and was Raven-Symoné's first album to enter the charts in the United States. It has sold 235,000 copies up to February 2, 2007, according to Nielsen SoundScan. In the same year, she also recorded music for That's So Raven's first original television soundtrack. The soundtrack debuted and peaked at No. 44 on the Billboard 200 and is now certified Gold by the RIAA for sales of 500,000 copies.

On October 31, 2006, Raven-Symoné's 1999 album Undeniable was reissued as From Then Until. The album sold over 8,000 in the US. In support of her third studio album and the That's So Raven Too! soundtrack, which was the second soundtrack album from the series, Raven-Symoné embarked on her first headlining tour. The "This Is My Time Tour" kicked off on May 19, 2006, in Richmond, VA and concluded on October 21, 2006, in Columbia, SC.

In 2006, she starred in the drama For One Night. and reprised her role as Galleria in The Cheetah Girls 2. She was also an as executive producer of the film.

Symoné recorded music for That's So Raven Too!'s second original television soundtrack. The soundtrack debuted and peaked at No. 44 on the Billboard 200, selling about 200,000 copies up to April 2007, according to Nielsen SoundScan. The Cheetah Girls 2 soundtrack debuted at No. 5 on the Billboard Top 200 and is certified for Platinum sales by the RIAA for sales of 1.3 million copies.

=== 2008–2011: Raven-Symoné and State of Georgia ===
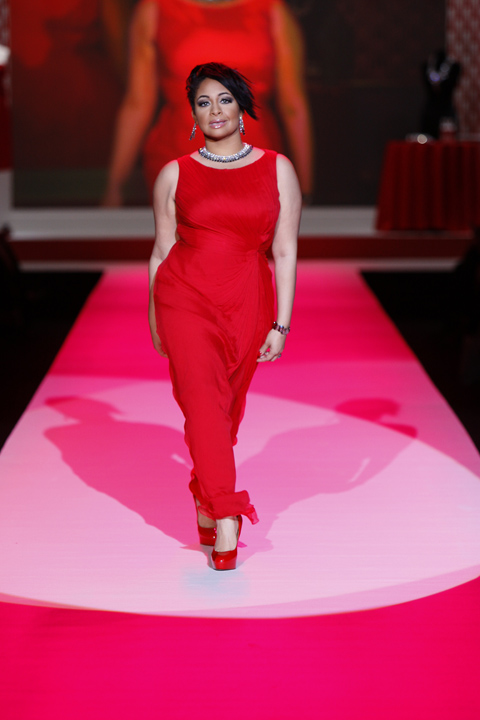
Symoné at The Heart Truth's Red Dress Collection Fashion Show in 2010

In 2008, The Cheetah Girls: One World began production. Raven-Symoné did not reprise her role as Galleria Garibaldi in the final film of The Cheetah Girls series, The Cheetah Girls: One World. While initial reports suggested that scheduling conflicts with her film College Road Trip and reported on-set tensions were to blame, Symoné later disclosed that her decision was primarily driven by feelings of being "excluded" and "ostracized" during the production of The Cheetah Girls 2. Her fourth studio album, Raven-Symoné, was released on April 29, 2008. The album debuted at No. 159 on Billboard's Top 200. The album was Raven-Symoné's final album release under Hollywood Records as she did not renew her contract with the label. To promote the album, she announced her intentions to headline her first all-arena tour, "The Pajama Party Tour," in Spring 2008, however, the tour was postponed to the summer under a new name.

In 2008, she starred as Melanie Porter in the comedy College Road Trip alongside Martin Lawrence. The movie went on to gross more than $60 million worldwide. From 2008 to 2015, she provided the voice of the character Iridessa, the light-fairy, as a part of the Disney Fairies franchise and direct-to-DVD Tinker Bell film series. She appeared in Chris Rock's 2009 documentary Good Hair. In late 2008, Raven-Symoné announced that she would return to the studio to record her next album.

In 2010, Raven-Symoné starred alongside Joanna Garcia in an ABC Family film titled Revenge of the Bridesmaids. Raven plays Abigail Scanlan while Garcia portrayed Parker, two childhood best friends who thwart to sabotage their ex friend's wedding so that true love can prevail. She also made a guest appearance on the Disney Channel Original Series Sonny with a Chance alongside Demi Lovato. She portrayed the character Amber Algoode, the president of Chad Dylan Cooper's fan club. She was a guest performer for the December 9th performance of Debbie Allen's dance-theater piece, The Hot Chocolate Nutcracker, at UCLA's Royce Hall. They would later televise the play in 2014 on BET and she would continue to perform in the play until 2019.

In 2011, Raven-Symoné starred as the main character of ABC Family's comedy State of Georgia. The series premiered in June 2011, marking this her first series in four years. The 12-episode season concluded on August 17, 2011 and ABC Family cancelled the show on September 16, 2011. Throughout 2011, Raven-Symoné had been working on her fifth studio album, but in March 2012, she confirmed that the album was canceled, saying that she "couldn't quite get it together" and that the music she had been working on "wasn't going to be something sellable."

=== 2012–present: Broadway and television focus ===
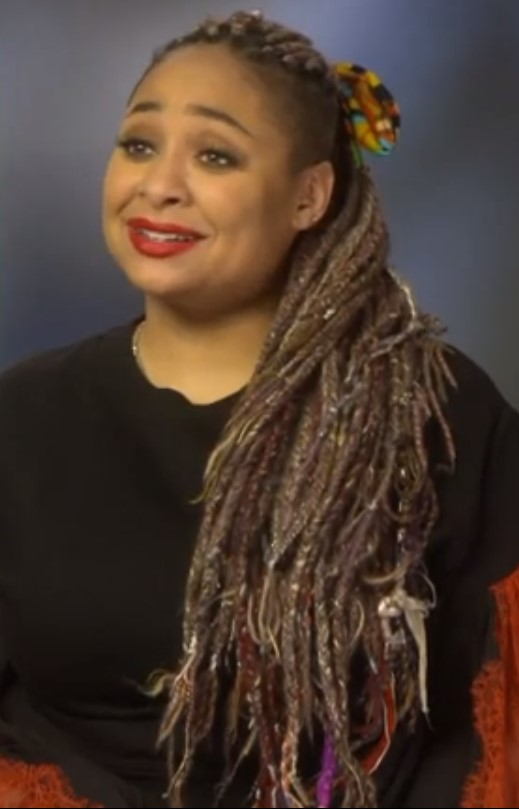
Symoné in 2019

On January 31, 2012, it was confirmed that she would appear in the Broadway musical Sister Act as Deloris van Cartier, marking her Broadway debut in a lead role. Her run started on March 27, 2012. Her contracted final performance coincided with the closure of the show on Broadway on August 26, 2012. In 2013, she filmed a cameo in See Dad Run alongside former Hangin' With Mr. Cooper co-star Mark Curry. In early 2014, she began filming Loose, an independent film co-starring Meagan Good, in Mississippi.

In February 2015, she made a guest appearance on the Fox series Empire. In May 2015, she began a recurring role as Rhonda Johnson on the ABC comedy series Black-ish; she would continue to appear in the role in the series until April 2020. In June 2015, she starred in the independent film A Girl Like Grace. Also in June 2015, Raven-Symoné joined the ABC daytime talk show The View on a permanent basis after she guest hosted the show multiple times earlier in the year. She was nominated for a Daytime Emmy Award during her run on the show from 2016 to 2017. In September 2015, she guest starred in a two part episode of the Disney Channel Original Series K.C. Undercover, portraying the character Simone Devereaux, who is the inventor of the family robot, Judy. This marked her first appearance on the channel since her guest appearance on Sonny With a Chance in 2010.

On October 27, 2016, she announced she would leave The View before the end of 2016 to focus on executive producing and starring in a That's So Raven spin-off, Raven's Home. The series premiered on July 21, 2017. For her performance, she earned a nomination for a Daytime Emmy Award. The series ran for six seasons, ending in September 2023.

In May 2016, she released two new tracks via online streaming, "Sarafina" and "Cruise Control". It was the first time in eight years she released new music since her self-titled project in 2008. On November 6, 2019, Raven competed in season two of The Masked Singer as "Black Widow". In December 2019, Raven-Symoné released the EP 33000 and in March 2020, released the single "Spacetruck" from the extended play InfraSounds under her mononym, Raven, in April 2020. In July 2020, she released the song "Serah". In May 2024, she signed an overall deal with Disney Branded Television. She was to produce the Raven's Home spinoff Alice in the Palace in 2025; a pilot was filmed but the series was not developed further. In October 2024, she became a host of the game show Scrabble on The CW.

In June 2026, it was announced she would have a guest appearance in season 2 of Adults.

== Personal life ==
In August 2013, Raven-Symoné commented on the legalization of same-sex marriage, stating that she was "excited to hear today that more states legalized gay marriage" and that it was "great to know [she] can now, should [she] wish to." In an October 2014 interview with Oprah Winfrey, she explained her rejection of labeling herself and of identifying as either African-American or gay, specifying that she was an "American" and a "human who loves humans." She was named Grand Marshal of the 2016 Montreal Pride Parade.

Raven-Symoné was in a relationship with model and actress AzMarie Livingston from 2012 to 2015. In June 2020, she married longtime girlfriend Miranda Maday. The couple have started a podcast together called Tea Time with Raven and Miranda since 2024.

In 2013, she briefly retired from acting and enrolled at Academy of Art University to pursue an associate degree in fine arts, which she completed in 2016. She came out of retirement in 2015 to be a co-host of The View. In the 2016 presidential election, she endorsed Libertarian nominee Gary Johnson.

== Filmography ==
=== Film ===
Year	Title	Role	Notes
1990	Rockin' Through the Decades	Herself	Documentary
1994	The Little Rascals	Stymie's Girlfriend	Non-speaking role
1998	Dr. Dolittle	Charisse Dolittle	
2001	Dr. Dolittle 2	Charisse Dolittle	
2004	The Princess Diaries 2: Royal Engagement	Princess Asana	
2004	Fat Albert	Danielle	Voice
2006	Everyone's Hero	Marti Brewster	Voice
2008	College Road Trip	Melanie "Mel" Porter	Also executive producer
2008	Tinker Bell	Iridessa	Voice
2009	Good Hair	Herself	Documentary
2009	Tinker Bell and the Lost Treasure	Iridessa	Voice
2010	Tinker Bell and the Great Fairy Rescue	Iridessa	Voice
2012	Secret of the Wings	Iridessa	Voice
2014	The Pirate Fairy	Iridessa	Voice
2014	Tinker Bell and the Legend of the NeverBeast	Iridessa	Voice
2015	A Girl Like Grace	Mary	
2017	Animal Crackers	Binkley	Voice
2020	Mighty Oak	Taylor Lazlo	
2024	Child Star	Herself	Documentary
2026	Stop! That! Train!	Shayna Gefilte Manischewitz	
2026	Quarter	Dr. Anderson	Post-production

=== Television ===
Year	Title	Role	Notes
1989–1992	The Cosby Show	Olivia Kendall	Main role (seasons 6–8)
1989	A Different World	Olivia Kendall	Episode: "Forever Hold Your Peace"
1990	The Earth Day Special	Olivia Kendall	Television special
1990	The Muppets at Walt Disney World	Little Girl	Television film
1990–1991	Sesame Street	Little Girl	2 episodes
1992	The Fresh Prince of Bel-Air	Claudia	Episode: "Vying for Attention"
1993	Alex Haley's Queen	Young Queen	Television miniseries
1993	Blindsided	Singer	Television film
1993–1997	Hangin' with Mr. Cooper	Nicole Lee	Main role (seasons 2–5)
1994	Kidsongs	Herself	Episode: "Katie's Little Lie"
1995–2000	Happily Ever After: Fairy Tales for Every Child	Goldilocks	Voice; episode: "Goldilocks and the Three Bears"
1995–2000	Happily Ever After: Fairy Tales for Every Child	Zoe / Olivia	Voice; episode: "The Princess and the Pauper"
1995	Bill Nye the Science Guy	Herself	Episode: "Human Transportation"
1997	Space Ghost Coast to Coast	Herself	Episode: "Piledriver"
1999	Zenon: Girl of the 21st Century	Nebula Wade	Television film
2001	My Wife and Kids	Charmaine	Episode: "Mom's Away: Part 1 & 2"
2001	The Proud Family	Angel Stephanie	Voice; episode: "Seven Days of Kwanzaa"
2002	The Cosby Show: A Look Back	Herself	Television special
2002	Weakest Link	Herself	Contestant, Season 2
2002–2007	Kim Possible	Monique	Main voice role
2003–2007	That's So Raven	Raven Baxter	Lead role; also producer (season 4)
2003	The Cheetah Girls	Galleria "Bubbles" Garibaldi	Television film
2003	Kim Possible: A Sitch in Time	Monique	Voice; television film
2003	Star Search	Herself	Episode: "The One with Star of That's So Raven, Raven-Symoné"
2004	Zenon: Z3	Nebula Wade	Television film
2004	Fillmore!	Alexandria Quarry, Maryanne Green	Voice, 2 episodes
2005	Higglytown Heroes	Playground Monitor	Voice; episode: "Meet Eubie's Cousin"
2005	Kim Possible Movie: So the Drama	Monique	Voice; television film
2005	Dear Santa	Herself	Television film
2006	For One Night	Brianna McCallister	Television film
2006	The Cheetah Girls 2	Galleria "Bubbles" Garibaldi	Television film; also co-executive producer
2006	The Suite Life of Zack & Cody	Raven Baxter	Episode: "That's So Suite Life of Hannah Montana"
2007	Cory in the House	Raven Baxter	Episode: "That's So in the House"
2007	Phenomenon	Herself	Episode: "Two"
2008	American Dad!	Katie / Wife	Voice, 2 episodes
2008, 2020	Celebrity Family Feud	Herself	2 episodes
2010	Sonny with a Chance	Amber Algoode	Episode: "That's So Sonny"
2010	Revenge of the Bridesmaids	Abigail "Abby" Scanlan	Television film
2010	Extreme Makeover: Home Edition	Herself	Episode: "Boys Hope/Girls Hope"
2010	The Mo'Nique Show	Herself	Episode: "Episode 116"
2011	Pixie Hollow Games	Iridessa	Voice; television film
2011	RuPaul's Drag U	Herself	Episode: "Looking for a New Job"
2011	State of Georgia	Georgia Chamberlain	Lead role
2011	Rocco's Dinner Party	Herself	Episode: "Bangers 'N Cash"
2011	PrankStars	Herself	Episode: "Adventures in Dogsitting"
2015–2016	The View	Herself	Co-host
2013	See Dad Run	Whitney Gibbons	Episode: "See Dad Run a Fever"
2013	Pixie Hollow Bake Off	Iridessa	Voice; television film
2014	Zoe Saldana Presents My Hero	Herself	Episode: "Raven-Symoné"
2014	Oprah: Where Are They Now?	Herself	Episode: "Raven-Symoné Opens up About Her Sexuality, Jackie Evancho, Maurice Benard"
2014	Just Keke	Herself	Episode: "How I Lost 260 Pounds"
2015	Empire	Olivia Lyon	2 episodes
2015	K.C. Undercover	Simone Devereaux	Episode: "Runaway Robot"
2015	The Real	Herself	Episode: "Raven-Symoné / Amy & Jeff Hammond"
2015–2020	Black-ish	Rhonda Johnson	Recurring role, 7 episodes
2016	RuPaul's Drag Race All Stars	Herself	Episode: "All Star Talent Show Extravaganza"
2016	Nashville	Herself	Episode: "It's Sure Gonna Hurt"
2016	The Jim Gaffigan Show	Herself	Episode: "The Trial"
2016	It Got Better	Herself	Episode: "...Featuring Raven-Symoné"
2016	Hollywood Game Night	Herself	Episode: "Oh Yes, It's Ladies Night"
2017	Master of None	Herself	Episode: "Buona Notte"
2017, 2018	Animals.	Nurse	2 episodes
2017, 2020	Celebrity Page	Herself	Guest, 2 episodes
2017–2023	Raven's Home	Raven Baxter	Lead role; also executive producer, directed 16 episodes
2018	Drunk History	Nichelle Nichols	Episode: "Game Changers"
2018–present	Big City Greens	Maria Media	Voice, 7 episodes
2019	Drop the Mic	Herself	Episode: "Ron Funches vs. Raven-Symoné / Joey Fatone vs. Joey McIntyre"
2019	Guardians of the Galaxy	Valkyrie	Voice, 2 episodes
2019	Just Roll with It	Betsy Hagg	Episode: "You Decide LIVE!"
2019	The Masked Singer	Herself (as Black Widow)	Contestant (season 2)
2019	Holidays Unwrapped: A Disney Channel Music Event	Herself	Host; television special
2019	Disney Hall of Villains	Herself	Television special
2019	Funny You Should Ask	Herself	9 episodes
2019–2021	25 Words or Less	Herself	Guest; 32 episodes
2020	The Bold Type	Alice Knight	Recurring role (season 4)
2020	Visible: Out on Television	Herself	Documentary miniseries
2020	The Disney Family Singalong	Herself	Television special
2020	Celebrity Watch Party	Herself	Main participant
2020	To Tell the Truth	Herself	Episode: "Mario Cantone, Raven-Symoné, Rita Moreno, Deon Cole"
2020	Bunk'd	Raven Baxter	Episode: "Raven About Bunk'd: Part 2"; directed "I Won't Let You Clown"
2020	Ever After with Jaleel White	Herself	Episode: "Raven-Symoné"
2020	Holiday Wars	Herself	Host
2020	Earth to Ned	Herself	Episode: "The Ned-aissance"
2020	Disney Holiday Magic Quest	Herself	Host; television special
2020–2021	Celebrity Game Face	Herself	2 episodes
2020–2021	Sydney to the Max	N/A	Directed 3 episodes
2021	What Not To Design	Herself	Host; also creator and executive producer
2022	Celebrity Wheel of Fortune	Herself	Episode: #210
2022	A Black Lady Sketch Show	Ali	Episode: "Peaches and Eggplants For Errbody"
2024	Big City Greens the Movie: Spacecation	Maria Media	Voice; television film
2024	Scrabble	Herself	Host
2024	Wizards Beyond Waverly Place	N/A	Directed "Ain't Gnome Party Like a Wizard Party"
2025	The Jason Lee Show	Herself	Season 3: Episode 7
2026	Adults	Talia	Episode: "Talia"
2026	The Ms. Pat Show	Lady Tyra	Episode: "Killin' and Dyin'"
2027	The Cheetah Girls: Next Gen	Galleria Garibaldi	Executive producer; filming

=== Stage ===
Year	Title	Role	Venue	Ref.
2012	Sister Act	Deloris Van Cartier	Broadway Theatre, Broadway	

== Discography ==
- Here's to New Dreams (1993)
- Undeniable (1999)
- This Is My Time (2004)
- Raven-Symoné (2008)

== Tours ==
- This Is My Time Tour (2006)
- Live in Concert Tour (2008–2009)

Opening act

- NSYNC in Concert (NSYNC) (1999)

== Awards and nominations ==
Symoné's accolades include five NAACP Image Awards, two Kids' Choice Awards, and three Young Artist Awards, as well as two Children's and Family Emmy Award nominations and three Daytime Emmy Award nominations.

== See also ==
- LGBT culture in New York City

== Notes ==
Media offices
Preceded by Rosie O'Donnell	The View co-host 2015–2016	Succeeded by Meghan McCain
