= This Is My Time (Raven-Symoné album) =

Studio album by Raven-Symoné
- Released: September 7, 2004
- Recorded: 2003–2004
- Genre: R&B
- Length: 48:41
- Label: Hollywood
- Producers: Raven-Symoné; Walter Afanasieff; Robbie Buchanan; Ray Cham; Def Jef; Kara DioGuardi; Matthew Gerrard; J Spark; James Joiner III; Penelope Magnet; Scott Storch; Robin Thicke; Christopher "Tricky" Stewart; Pro-Jay

Raven-Symoné chronology
Undeniable (1999)	This Is My Time (2004)	Raven-Symoné (2008)

Singles from This Is My Time
- 1. "Backflip" Released: July 28, 2004; 2. "Bump" Released: January 28, 2005

This Is My Time is the third studio album by American singer-songwriter and actress Raven-Symoné, released in the United States on September 21, 2004 by Hollywood Records. The album is her debut with the Disney-owned label and debuted at number 51 on the US Billboard 200, with 19,000 copies sold in its first week. It nevertheless became Raven-Symoné's best-selling solo album, selling 237,000 copies up to February 2, 2007 in the US, according to Nielsen SoundScan.

== Release and promotion ==
Raven-Symoné released a five-track EP with Hollywood Records on January 1, 2004 prior to the release of This Is My Time, containing "Backflip", "Bump", "Overloved", "What Is Love?", and "Mystify".

The single "Backflip" debuted on Radio Disney on July 28, 2004. Its release was accompanied by a music video directed by Sanaa Hamri. It premiered on BET's Access Granted on August 25, 2004. The video received heavy rotation on Disney Channel, BET and MTV.

Four songs from the album were incorporated into soundtracks of Walt Disney films: The Lion King 1½ with "Grazing in the Grass"; The Princess Diaries 2: Royal Engagement with the album's title track; Ice Princess with "Bump"; and Go Figure with "Life Is Beautiful".

Symoné performed "Backflip" live for the first time at Macy's Thanksgiving Day Parade on November 25, 2004. Symoné performed the song on tours, This Is My Time Tour and Raven-Symoné: Live in Concert Tour.

== Critical reception ==
Professional ratings
Review scores
Source	Rating
AllMusic	2.5/5 stars
USA Today	2/4 stars
Vibe	2.5/5 marks

Following its release, This Is My Time received generally mixed reviews. Both AllMusic and Vibe gave the album two and a half stars out of five. Vibe editor Angie Romero wrote: "Once known as little Olivia from The Cosby Show, Raven-Symoné wants to show the world she’s all grown up. To prove it, she records an album full of pop/R&B hybrids brimming with Hilary Duff–like innocence and sparkling arrangements. Yet, none of [her] composers can compensate for the teen queen’s sub-par singing, the one thing preventing her from getting her full bloom on." AllMusic critic Jason Thurston found that "Symoné here offers up music that is sweet, melodic, and definitely mature R&B, in the vein of another singer who got her start as a kid on a popular TV show – Janet Jackson."

== Commercial performance ==
This Is My Time debuted at number 50 on the US Billboard Top R&B/Hip-Hop Albums chart and at number 51 on the official Billboard 200 of week dated October 9, 2004, with moderately successful first week sales of 19,000 copies (best debut in the chart to date); making it Raven-Symoné's first album to enter the chart in the United States. The set sold 237,000 copies to date in the US, according to Nielsen SoundScan.

== Track listing ==
This Is My Time track listing
No.	Title	Writer(s)	Producer(s)	Length
1.	"Mystify"	Jay Condiotti; Matthew Gerrard; Robbie Nevil	Gerrard	3:46
2.	"Backflip"	Kara DioGuardi; Scott Storch	Storch	3:53
3.	"What Is Love?"	Joseph Belmaati; DioGuardi; Mich Hansen; Robin Carlsson	DioGuardi; J-Spark	3:46
4.	"Overloved"	Diane Warren	Walter Afanasieff	4:11
5.	"Set Me Free"	Raven-Symoné; James Gass; Robin Thicke; Sean Hurley	Pro-Jay; Thicke	3:45
6.	"Alice"	Raven-Symoné; Jeffrey Fortson; James Joiner III	Def Jef; Joiner III	3:59
7.	"Just Fly Away"	Raven-Symoné, Haskel Jackson, Ray Cham	Cham	3:33
8.	"Bump"	Condiotti, Gerrard, Nevil	Gerrard	3:28
9.	"Life Is Beautiful"	Shelly Peiken, Jeff Franzel, Eve Nelson, Maria Christensen	Penelope Magnet, Tricky "Trixster" Stewart	3:17
10.	"What's Real?"	Guy Roche, Shelly Peiken	Magnet, Trixster	3:35
11.	"Grazing in the Grass"	Harry Elston, Philemon Hou	Robbie Buchanan	3:08
12.	"Typical"	Raven-Symoné, Gerrard, Nevil	Gerrard	3:16
13.	"This Is My Time"	Raven-Symoné, Gerrard, Nevil	Gerrard	4:24
Total length:				48:41

Notes

- "What Is Love?" covers the 2003 song originally performed by Play.
- "Grazing in the Grass" covers the 1969 renderition of the song performed by The Friends of Distinction.
- "Overloved" was later covered by Paula DeAnda on her debut self-titled album.
- "This Is My Time" is featured on the soundtrack for The Princess Diaries 2: Royal Engagement.
- "Bump" appears on the soundtrack Ice Princess.

== Tour ==
Raven in Concert was the debut concert tour by Raven-Symoné in support of This Is My Time. Primarily visiting North America, the tour played nearly 40 shows at numerous music festivals and state fairs in the United States.

=== Opening acts ===
- Lil' J (August 6–13, August 16–29, September 8, September 15 and October 7, 2006)
- Jump5 (Baton Rouge, Fairlea, Agawam and Allegan)
- LaTanya Monroe (Glen Allen)
- Lil J Xavier (Arlington)
- Everlife (Arlington)
- Choo-Choo Soul (Monroe)

== Charts ==
Chart performance for This Is My Time
Chart (2004)	Peak position
Canadian Albums (Nielsen SoundScan)	74
Canadian R&B Albums (Nielsen SoundScan)	19
US Billboard 200	51
US Top R&B/Hip-Hop Albums (Billboard)	50

== Release history ==
Release history and formats for This Is My Time
Country	Date	Label
Europe	September 7, 2004	Megaphon Importservice
United Kingdom	September 14, 2004	Hollywood
Japan	September 15, 2004	Hollywood
United States	September 21, 2004	Hollywood
Canada	September 21, 2004	Hollywood/Universal Music Group
Slovakia	September 21, 2004	Hollywood/Universal Music Group
France	September 21, 2004	Hollywood/Universal Music Group
Hong Kong	October 15, 2004	Hollywood/Universal Music Group
