= Frankie Smith =

American funk musician and R&B/soul songwriter (1940–2019)

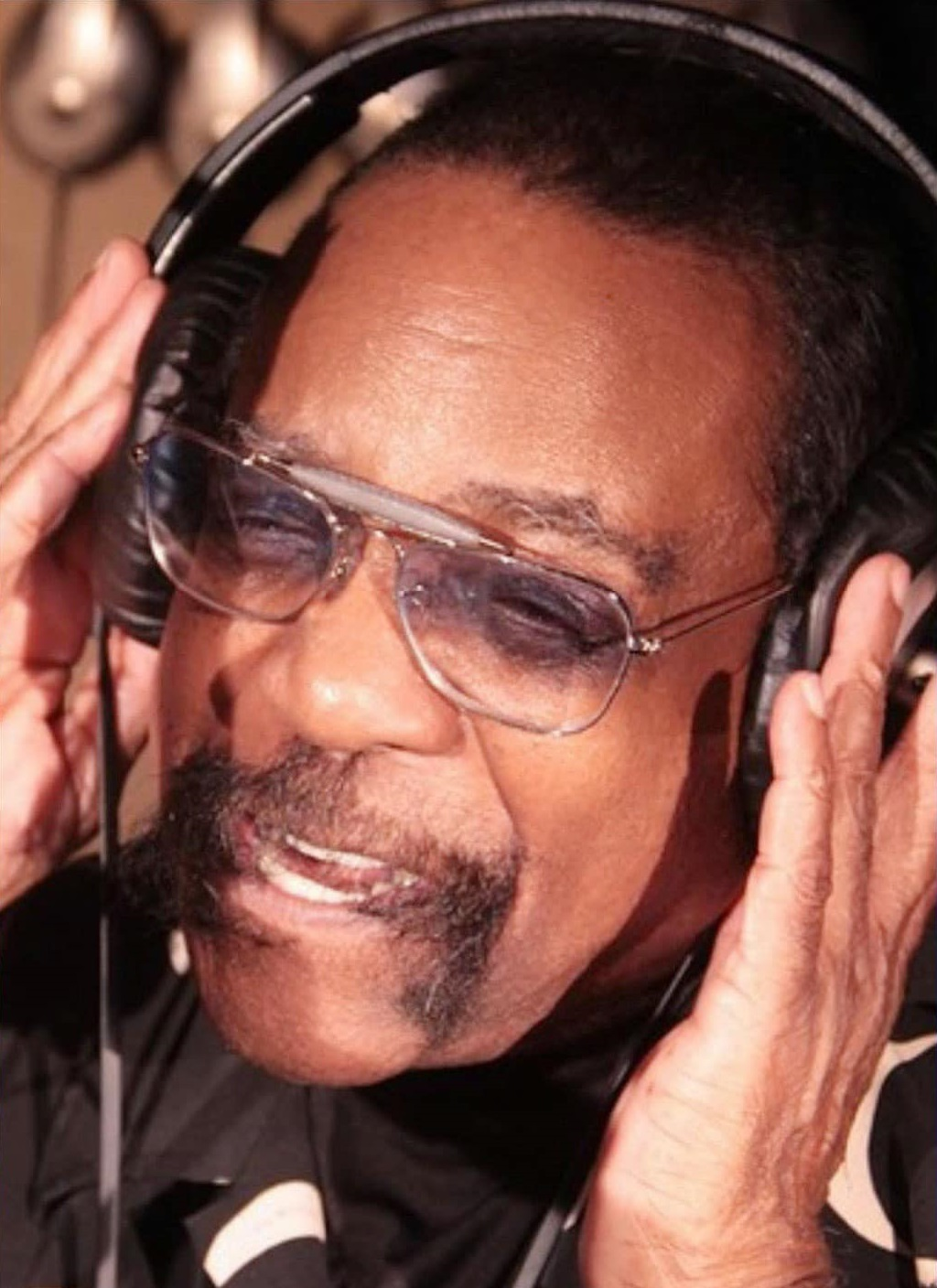

Background information
- Born: Franklyn Leon Smith; January 29, 1940; Philadelphia, Pennsylvania, U.S.A.
- Died: March 8, 2019 (aged 79) Philadelphia, Pennsylvania
- Genres: R&B, soul, funk, disco, old-school hip-hop
- Occupations: Singer, songwriter
- Instruments: Vocals, keyboards
- Years active: 1979–2019
- Labels: Paramount, WMOT, Amstate

Franklyn Leon Smith (January 29, 1940 – March 8, 2019) was an American funk musician and R&B/soul songwriter. He was best known for his 1981 hit single "Double Dutch Bus".

== Career ==
Smith went to college in Tennessee for elementary education with a minor in music. He became a writer for funk and soul artists such as the O'Jays and The Spinners. In 1972, he would record for Paramount, releasing a single called "Double Dutch" under the name Franklin Franklin, but it failed to become a hit. He was also influential in the careers of the rappers Tone Loc, Ice Cube and Snoop Dogg.

With his 1981 single "Double Dutch Bus", released by WMOT Records, Smith popularized a nonsensical form of slang (from his 1981 song "Slang Thang"), in which "iz" is placed in the middle of a word (for example, the word "place" becomes "plizace"), or the last letters of a word are replaced with "-izzle" ("sure" becomes shizzle). A type of infix, it found greater popularity later on in hip-hop and rap with its usage by Snoop Dogg.

== Death ==
Smith died in Philadelphia on March 8, 2019, at the age of 79.

== Discography ==
=== Albums ===
- 1981: Children of Tomorrow
- 2006: Frankie Smith and His World Wide Party Crew

=== Singles ===
- 1980: "Double Dutch Bus" (#30 US)
- 1980: "Double Dutch"
- 1981: "The Auction"
- 1981: "Teeny-Bopper Lady"
- 1982: "Double Dutch Bus II"
- 1982: "Yo-Yo Champ (From Mississippi)"
- 1985: "Slapp Ya Thigh"
- 1985: "Congratulations for Graduating"
