= Disneymania (series) =

2003–2010 compilation album series

Compilation album series by various artists
- Released: 2002–2013
- Recorded: 1998–2010
- Genre: Pop
- Label: Walt Disney
- Producer: Jay Landers

Disneymania is an American series of compilation albums of Disney songs covered by mainstream pop and/or Disney Channel artists singing their own rendition or version of the song. As of 2010, nine Disneymania albums (two being side-albums) have been released. The albums are no longer being produced.

== Discography ==
=== Sequential albums ===
Year	Album	Peak chart positions			Certifications (sales thresholds)
Year	Album	Billboard 200	U.S. Top Internet Albums	U.S. Top Kids Audio	Certifications (sales thresholds)
2002	Disneymania: Released: September 17, 2002	52	258	1	US: Gold
2004	Disneymania 2: Released: January 27, 2004	30	52	1	US: Gold
2005	Disneymania 3: Released: February 15, 2005	30	46	1	US: Gold
2006	Disneymania 4: Released: April 4, 2006	15	—	2	US: Gold
2007	Disneymania 5: Released: March 27, 2007	14	—	1	—
2008	Disneymania 6: Released: May 20, 2008	33	—	—	—
2010	Disneymania 7: Released: March 9, 2010	78	—	—	—

=== Other albums ===
Year	Album	Peak chart positions			Certifications (sales thresholds)
Year	Album	Billboard 200	U.S. Top Internet Albums	U.S. Top Kids Audio	Certifications (sales thresholds)
2005	Disneyremixmania: Released: September 27, 2006	146	2	—	—
2008	Princess Disneymania: Released: September 30, 2009	191	5	—	—

== Commonly used songs ==
The following is a list of songs that appear on more than one Disneymania CD.

=== A Dream Is a Wish Your Heart Makes ===
1. Daniel Bedingfield (DM 2)
2. Kimberley Locke (DM 3)
3. Disney Channel Circle of Stars (DM 4)
4. Nikki Blonsky (DM 6)

=== A Whole New World ===
1. Sweetbox (DM 1) *Bonus track
2. LMNT (DM 2)
3. Nick Lachey and Jessica Simpson (DM 3)

=== Can You Feel the Love Tonight ===
1. S Club (DM 1)
2. Sara Paxton (DM 4)
3. Elliott Yamin (DM 6)

=== Circle of Life ===
1. Ronan Keating (DM 1)
2. Disney Channel Circle of Stars (DM 2)
3. (All Star Remix) Disney Channel Circle of Stars (DRM)

=== Colors of the Wind ===
1. Ashanti feat. Lil' sis Shi Shi (DM 1)
2. Christy Carlson Romano (DM 3)
3. (Soul Sister Remix) Ashanti feat. Lil' sis Shi Shi (DRM)
4. Vanessa Hudgens (DM 5)

=== Cruella de Vil ===
1. Lalaine (DM 3)
2. (DJ Skribble Spot Remix) Lalaine (DRM)
3. Skye Sweetnam (DM 4) *Bonus track
4. Hayden Panettiere (DM 5)
5. Selena Gomez (DM 6)

=== Go the Distance ===
1. K-Ci & JoJo (DM 4) *Bonus track
2. Lucas Grabeel (DM 5)

=== Hakuna Matata ===
1. Baha Men (DM 1)
2. Debby Ryan (DM 7)

=== Hawaiian Roller Coaster Ride ===
1. Jump5 (DM 3)
2. (Mahalo Remix) Jump5 (DRM)
3. Baha Men (DM 4)

=== I Just Can't Wait to Be King ===
1. Aaron Carter (DM 1)
2. Allstar Weekend (DM 7)

=== I Wan'na Be Like You ===
1. Smash Mouth (DM 1)
2. Nikki Webster (DM 2) *Bonus track
3. (Monkey C Remix) Smash Mouth (DRM)
4. Jonas Brothers (DM 5)

=== I Won't Say (I'm in Love) ===
1. The Cheetah Girls (DM 3)
2. (Grrl Power Remix) The Cheetah Girls (DRM)

=== If I Never Knew You ===
1. The Cheetah Girls (DM 4)
2. Tiffany Thornton (DM 7)

=== It's a Small World ===
1. Baha Men (DM 2)
2. (RapMania! Mix) fan_3 (DM 3)
3. (Shorty Remix) Baha Men (DRM)

=== Kiss the Girl ===
1. No Secrets (DM 1)
2. Vitamin C (DM 3)
3. Ashley Tisdale (DM 5)
4. Colbie Caillat (DM 6)

=== Once Upon a Dream ===
1. No Secrets (DM 2)
2. Emily Osment (PDM)

=== Part of Your World ===
1. Jessica Simpson (DM 1)
2. Skye Sweetnam (DM 3)
3. (C-Girl Rock Remix) Skye Sweetnam (DRM)
4. Miley Cyrus (DM 5)
5. Anna Maria Perez de Taglé (DM 7)

=== Real Gone ===
1. Billy Ray Cyrus (DM 6)
2. Honor Society (DM 7)

=== Reflection ===
1. Christina Aguilera (DM 1)
2. (Remix) Christina Aguilera (DM 4)
3. Everlife (DM 5)
4. Keke Palmer (DM 6)

=== Some Day My Prince Will Come ===
1. Anastacia (DM 1)
2. Ashley Tisdale feat. Drew Seeley (DM 4)
3. The Cheetah Girls (DM 6)

=== Strangers Like Me ===
1. Everlife (DM 3)
2. (Jungle Rock Remix) Everlife (DRM)

=== The Bare Necessities ===
1. Bowling for Soup (DM 3)
2. (Jungle Boogie Remix) Bowling for Soup (DRM)

=== The Second Star to the Right ===
1. Jesse McCartney (DM 2)
2. (Lost Boys Remix) Jesse McCartney (DRM)
3. T-Squad (DM 5)

=== The Siamese Cat Song ===
1. Hilary & Haylie Duff (DM 2)
2. (Cat-Scratch Remix) Hilary & Haylie Duff (DRM)
3. B5 (DM 5)

=== True to Your Heart ===
1. Raven (DM 2)
2. (China Doll Remix) Raven (DRM)
3. Keke Palmer (DM 5)

=== Under the Sea ===
1. A*Teens (DM 1)
2. Raven-Symoné (DM 3)
3. (Reggae Remix) Raven-Symoné (DRM)
4. Booboo Stewart (DM 7)

=== When She Loved Me ===
1. Jordan Pruitt (DM 5)
2. Bridgit Mendler (DM 7)

=== When You Wish Upon a Star ===
1. *NSYNC (DM 1)
2. Ashley Gearing (DM 2)
3. Jesse McCartney (DM 3)
4. Kate Voegele (DM 6)

=== You'll Be in My Heart ===
1. Usher (DM 1)
2. Teddy Geiger (DM 4)
3. Drew Seeley (DM 6)

=== Zip-a-Dee-Doo-Dah ===
1. Stevie Brock (DM 2)
2. Aly & AJ (DM 3)
3. Miley Cyrus (DM 4)

== Most artist appearances ==
Artists who have appeared the most across all Disneymania albums:

- Raven-Symoné: eight songs (included three as part of "Disney Channel Circle of Stars")
- The Cheetah Girls: six songs
- Hilary Duff: five songs (included two as part of "Disney Channel Circle of Stars")
- Anneliese van der Pol: four songs (included three as part of "Disney Channel Circle of Stars")
- Baha Men: four songs
- Drew Seeley: four songs
- Everlife: four songs
- Jesse McCartney: four songs
- Jump5: four songs
- Orlando Brown: four songs (included three as part of "Disney Channel Circle of Stars")
- Ashley Tisdale: three songs (included one as part of "Disney Channel Circle of Stars")
- Christy Carlson Romano: three songs (included two as part of "Disney Channel Circle of Stars")
- Disney Channel Circle of Stars: three songs
- Kyla Pratt: three songs (as part of "Disney Channel Circle of Stars")
- Lalaine: three songs
- Skye Sweetnam: three songs
- Jessica Simpson: two songs
- Miley Cyrus: two songs

== See also ==
- Radio Disney
- We Love Disney
