= Orlando Brown (actor) =

American actor (born 1987)

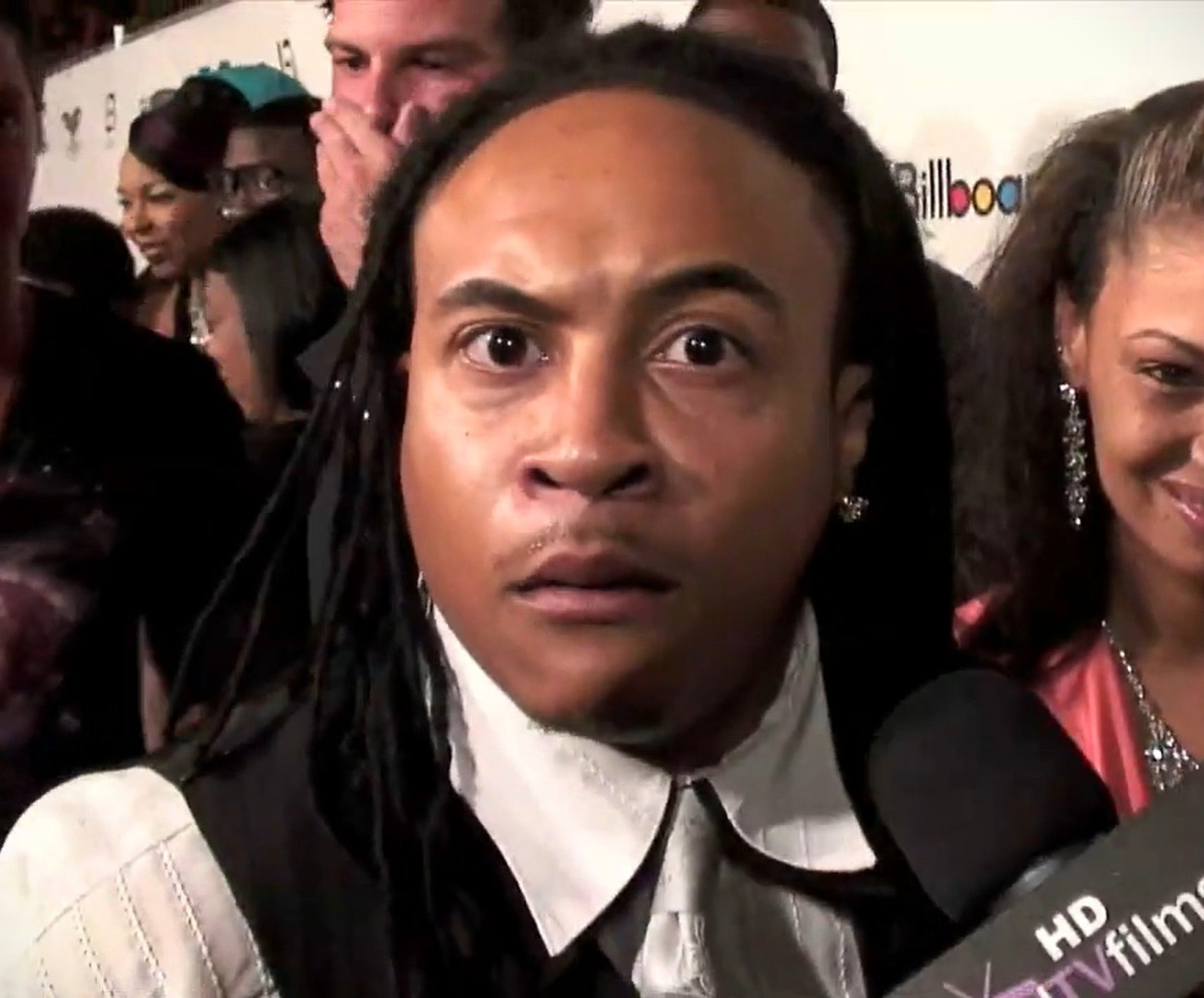
- Brown in 2009
- Born: December 4, 1987 (age 38); Los Angeles, California, U.S.
- Occupations: Actor; rapper; singer; restaurateur
- Years active: 1994–2023 (actor); 2004–present (rapper; singer)
- Spouse: Danielle Brown (m. 2020)
- Children: 4

Orlando Brown (born December 4, 1987) is an American rapper, singer, restaurateur and former actor. He is best known for his roles as Eddie Thomas on That's So Raven, Cadet Kevin "Tiger" Dunne in Major Payne, Nelson in The Jamie Foxx Show, 3J Winslow on Family Matters, and Max on Two of a Kind. He was the title protagonist on both the Waynehead (as Damey Wayne) and Fillmore! (as Cornelius Fillmore) animated series. He also voiced the character of Sticky Webb in The Proud Family. In 2023, Brown was cast in the second season of the Zeus Network reality television show Bad Boys: Texas. In 2025, he opened a restaurant called Orlando Brown's Million Dollar Fried Chicken in Phoenix, Arizona.

== Early life ==
Orlando Brown was born in 1987 in Los Angeles, California, to Tiffney Anderson and Aaron Dotson.

== Acting career ==
Brown made his acting debut in 1995 as Cadet Kevin "Tiger" Dunne in Major Payne. In 1998, he co-starred with Mary-Kate and Ashley Olsen in Two of a Kind. In 1996, he was cast as 3J Winslow in Family Matters. That same year, Brown began voice acting when he starred as a childhood version of Damon Wayans in Waynehead. For Disney he co-starred with Raven-Symoné in That's So Raven, appeared in Max Keeble's Big Move and Eddie's Million Dollar Cook-Off. In 2002, he became the voice of Cornelius Fillmore on the Disney Channel animated series, Fillmore!. After leaving Disney in 2007, Brown decided to concentrate on his music career.

== Legal issues ==
On April 10, 2007, Brown was pulled over by the police in Texas for driving without his headlights on. While searching his vehicle, they found marijuana in the side door and arrested him for marijuana possession. Brown denied that the marijuana belonged to him and stated that he had borrowed the vehicle from a friend.

On February 28, 2016, in Torrance, California, Brown was arrested and later charged with domestic battery, obstruction of justice, drug possession with intent to sell, and possession of contraband in jail, following an altercation with his then girlfriend in public. Police were called to the scene after he struck her in the parking lot of a police station and he was found by officers to be in possession of methamphetamine at the time of the incident. Brown failed to appear for a scheduled court date in relation to the charges and a warrant was issued for his arrest; he was ultimately taken into custody by police on March 18, 2016, in Barstow, California, after police were called to a private residence in response to complaints of a domestic disturbance between Brown, his girlfriend, and his girlfriend's mother and subsequently faced additional charges of domestic battery, drug possession, and resisting arrest.

Following his release from jail in Barstow, he again failed to appear for a scheduled court date and a warrant was again issued for his arrest; he fled California for Nevada and was eventually apprehended by bounty hunters. On June 5, 2016, Brown was arrested in Las Vegas by police while leaving a local hotel known for prostitution and illegal drug sale and use. He refused to cooperate with officers after they stopped his taxicab, and a subsequent search found him to be in possession of methamphetamine and a pipe, and that he had an outstanding warrant for his arrest, in relation to one of his unresolved domestic battery charges. He was charged with drug possession, possession of drug paraphernalia, and resisting arrest.

Several months later, on September 2, 2016, Brown, recently released from a medical facility where he had been hospitalized for undisclosed reasons, was arrested after breaking into Legends Restaurant & Venue, a Las Vegas establishment owned by his childhood friend Danny Boy, and attempting to change the locks. Police found Brown on the roof of the building, after security cameras showed him entering the building without permission.

In early 2016, Brown debuted to the public a new tattoo, that of his former That's So Raven co-star Raven-Symoné, on his neck. Later that year, he entered rehab, after an intervention from friends and family, but remained in the program one week, and was photographed shortly after his release walking down the street barefoot, carrying a box of wine.

On December 22, 2022, Brown was arrested in Lima, Ohio on charges of domestic violence. The charge, which was revealed to be a misdemeanor for domestic violence, involved allegedly threatening his brother with a hammer and a broken off knife blade. Jail records afterwards showed that Brown was being held in Allen County jail on no bond. In February 2023, he was released from Allen County jail.

== Business ventures ==
After becoming sober again in late 2025, Brown opened his chicken restaurant Orlando Brown's Million Dollar Fried Chicken in Phoenix, Arizona.

== Personal life ==
In 2018, Brown appeared on an episode of Dr. Phil, and made false claims, among them that he was the son of musical icon Michael Jackson, saying his full name was Orlando Brown Prince Michael Jackson Jr., and that he had four children, two of whom he had never met and whose names he did not know. He claimed the oldest of his children was between the ages of 16 and 18, meaning Brown would have been between 13 and 15 at the time of their birth. He additionally claimed he had been sober for four years. The episode aired on December 21, 2018. After his appearance on the show, Brown opened up about his struggles with addiction at a church fundraising event in 2020. Orlando's oldest three children are Maisen Brown with Ashely Ashe, Hunter Brown with Omena Alexandra, & Journee Brown with Brianna Henson. Brown has been married to Danielle Brown since the year 2020 and has a biological son as well as two stepsons, Jeremiah and Ezra.

At the time of his December 22, 2022, arrest, Brown was revealed to be homeless and living with his brother, who claimed that he took Brown into his home two weeks prior so he could avoid living in a homeless shelter.

Brown has repeatedly claimed since 2022 that he had a sexual relationship with the rapper Bow Wow. Bow Wow has denied Brown's claims while maintaining that Brown is "hilarious".

== Filmography ==
=== Film ===
Year	Title	Role	Notes
1995	Major Payne	Kevin "Tiger" Dunne	
1997	A Walton Easter	Spelling Bee finalist	
1998	Senseless	Brandon Witherspoon	
2000	Inhumane Worker	Marchel Williats	
2000	Perfect Game	Marcel Williams	
2000	The Tangerine Bear	Bear, Little Boy (voices)	
2001	Max Keeble's Big Move	Dobbs	
2003	Maniac Magee	Mars Bar Thompson	
2003	Eddie's Million Dollar Cook-Off	Frankie	
2005	Suits on the Loose	Cody	
2005	The Proud Family Movie	Sticky Webb (voice)	Television film
2012	Christmas in Compton	Tyrone	
2012	We the Party	Club DJ	Uncredited
2013	Run Ya' Pockets: A Political Economy Analysis of Crime Amongst Harlem Youths	LeTavious	College film
2015	Straight Outta Compton	Block Dude	
2015	American Bad Boy	Charles	
2022	Bloody Hands	Detective Brown	

=== Television ===
Year	Title	Role	Notes
1995	Coach	Kid	Episode: "Ten Percent of Nothing"
1996	In the House	Steven	Episode: "To Die For"
1996	The Parent 'Hood	George Washington Carver	Episode: "I'm O'Tay, You're O-Tay"
1996–1998	The Jamie Foxx Show	Nelson	4 episodes (recurring)
1996–1998	Family Matters	Jerry Jamal "3J" Jameson	21 episodes
1996–1997	Waynehead	Damey Wayne "Waynehead" (voice)	13 episodes
1996–2000	Moesha	Chuckie / James	3 episodes
1997–1999	Malcolm & Eddie	Max; Cairo	Episode: "Hoop Schemes"; Episode: "Daddio"
1997	Sister, Sister	Clayton	Episode: "Little Man Date"
1997	The Pretender	Bruno	Episode: "Back from the Dead Again"
1997	The Wayans Bros.	Charlie	Episode: "Say It Ain't So, Marlon"
1998–1999	Two of a Kind	Max	8 episodes
1998	Damon	Elvin	Episode: "The Last Cub Scout"
1999	Friends and Foes	Chris	TV
1999	Safe Harbor	Chris	10 episodes
2001	Lizzie McGuire	Travis Elliot	Episode: "Random Acts of Miranda"
2001–2005	The Proud Family	Sticky Webb (voice)	38 episodes
2002–2004	Fillmore!	Cornelius Fillmore (voice)	26 episodes
2002–2007	Express Yourself	Himself	TV
2003–2004	Clifford's Puppy Days	Evan Thomas Taylor (voice)	3 episodes
2003–2007	That's So Raven	Edward "Eddie" Thomas	Main role
2004	Start Up, Go Down, and Get Lost	Dwayne	1 episode
2004	One on One	Dwayne	Episode: "He's Not Heavy, He's My Half-Brother"
2005	Phil of the Future	Andrew "Andy" Baxley	Episode: "Team Diffy"
2007	WordGirl	Tommy (voice)	Episode: "Jerky Jerk/Becky's Birthday"
2011	The End	The Man / The Boomshadow	4 episodes
2011	Hell's Kitchen	Himself	1 episode
2023	Bad Boys: Texas	Himself	Main cast (season 2)

== Discography ==
=== Albums ===
Album	Released
Trade It All	2006

=== Soundtracks ===
Year	Song	Soundtrack
2004	"That's So Raven (theme song)" (with Raven-Symoné & Anneliese Van Der Pol)	That's So Raven
2004	"Circle of Life" (with DCCoS)	Disneymania 2
2004	"Circle of Life (Christmas version)" (with DCCoS)	Radio Disney Jingle Jams
2005	"Circle of Life (All Star Remix)" (with DCCoS)	DisneyRemixMania
2006	"Little by Little" (with Raven-Symoné)	That's So Raven Too!
2006	"Will It Go Round in Circles"	That's So Raven Too!
2006	"Little by Little (Remix)" (with Raven-Symoné; iTunes bonus track)	That's So Raven Too!
2006	"A Dream Is a Wish Your Heart Makes" (with DCCoS)	Disneymania 4
2006	"Super Cali (BoiOB mix)"	Disneymania 4
2008	"A Dream Is a Wish Your Heart Makes" (with DCCoS)	Princess DisneyMania

=== Songs ===
Year	Song	Album
2003	"That's So Raven (main song)" (w/ Raven-Symoné and Anneliese van der Pol)	That's So Raven
2004	"Circle of Life" (w/ DCCoS)	DisneyMania 2
2006	"Little by Little" (w/ Raven-Symoné)	That's So Raven Too!
2006	"Will It Go Round in Circles"	That's So Raven Too!
2006	"A Dream Is a Wish Your Heart Makes" (w/ DCCoS)	DisneyMania 4
2018	"F**k My Fame (Radio)"	"F**k My Fame (Radio)" – Single
2019	"Empire"	"Empire" – Single
2020	"Hi, I'm Famous"	"Hi, I'm Famous" – Single
2020	"Coming to America"	"Coming to America" – Single
2025	“Love to You”	“Love to You” - Single
