= Disney Princess: The Ultimate Song Collection =

Compilation album by Various Artists
- Released: September 21, 2004
- Label: Walt Disney
- Producers: Howard Ashman, Robbie Buchanan, Robert Kraft, Jay Landers, Mark Mancina, Alan Menken, Tim Rice, Stephen Schwartz

Professional ratings
Review scores
Source	Rating
Allmusic	3/5 stars

Disney Princess: The Ultimate Song Collection is a 2004 album that is a compilation of various Disney Princess songs, including the original song "If You Can Dream", that has since been featured on several other Disney compilation albums. It was released on September 21, 2004, by Walt Disney Records.

== Track listing ==
1. "If You Can Dream" - Lea Salonga, Judy Kuhn, Christie Hauser, Susan Stevens Logan, Paige O'Hara, and Jodi Benson (3:50)
2. "Part of Your World" - Jodi Benson (from The Little Mermaid) (3:14)
3. "A Whole New World" - Lea Salonga and Brad Kane (from Aladdin) (2:41)
4. "Just Around the Riverbend" - Judy Kuhn (from Pocahontas) (2:30)
5. "Colors of the Wind" - Judy Kuhn (from Pocahontas) (3:34)
6. "Someday My Prince Will Come" - Adriana Caselotti (from Snow White and the Seven Dwarfs) (1:54)
7. "So This Is Love" - Ilene Woods and Mike Douglas (from Cinderella) (1:32)
8. "A Dream Is a Wish Your Heart Makes" - Ilene Woods (from Cinderella) (4:36)
9. "Once Upon a Dream" - Mary Costa and Bill Shirley (from Sleeping Beauty) (2:46)
10. "Can You Feel the Love Tonight" - Kristle Edwards, Joseph Williams, and Sally Dworsky (from The Lion King) (2:57)
11. "Belle" - Paige O'Hara, Richard White and Chorus (from Beauty and the Beast) (5:08)
12. "Reflection" - Lea Salonga (from Mulan) (2:26)
13. "Kiss the Girl" - Samuel E. Wright (from The Little Mermaid) (2:42)
14. "If You Can Dream" - Ashley Gearing (4:01)

== Charts ==
Chart performance for Disney Princess: The Ultimate Song Collection
Chart (2004–2006)	Peak position
UK Compilation Albums (OCC)	86
US Kid Albums (Billboard)	4

== See also ==
- Walt Disney Records
