= Disneymania 7 =

Compilation album by Various artists
- Released: March 9, 2010
- Genre: Pop
- Length: 47:06
- Label: Walt Disney
- Producer: Jay Landers

Disneymania album chronology
Princess Disneymania (2008)	Disneymania 7 (2010)

Disneymania 7 is the seventh and final installment in the Disneymania series. It features a variety of contemporary performers performing Disney songs. Disneymania 7 was released on March 9, 2010.

== Track listing ==
#	Title	Performer(s)	Film	Length
1	"I Just Can't Wait to Be King"	Allstar Weekend	The Lion King	3:33
2	"Trust in Me"	Selena Gomez	The Jungle Book	3:25
3	"Real Gone"	Honor Society	Cars	3:26
4	"If I Never Knew You"	Tiffany Thornton	Pocahontas	3:00
5	"Stand Out"	Mitchel Musso	A Goofy Movie	2:57
6	"Good Enough"	KSM	The Wild	3:53
7	"Little Wonders"	Savannah Outen	Meet the Robinsons	3:32
8	"Under the Sea"	Booboo Stewart	The Little Mermaid	3:09
9	"When She Loved Me"	Bridgit Mendler	Toy Story 2	3:15
10	"Her Voice"	Drew Seeley	The Little Mermaid	3:02
11	"Bella Notte"	Ruby Summer	Lady and the Tramp	3:30
12	"Part of Your World"	Anna Maria Perez de Taglé	The Little Mermaid	3:41
13	"What I've Been Looking For"	Alyson Stoner	High School Musical	2:37
14	"Gift of a Friend"	Demi Lovato	Tinker Bell and the Lost Treasure	3:26
15	"Hakuna Matata"	Debby Ryan	The Lion King	3:20

== Singles ==
1. Demi Lovato - "Gift of a Friend" (Tinker Bell and the Lost Treasure)
2. Drew Seeley - "Her Voice" (Little Mermaid on Broadway)

== Music videos ==
1. Demi Lovato - "Gift of a Friend" (Tinker Bell and the Lost Treasure)
2. Drew Seeley - "Her Voice" (Little Mermaid on Broadway)

== Chart performance ==
Chart (2010)	Peak position
Billboard 200	78
Billboard Kids Albums	2
