= Disneymania 6 =

Album of cover vsersions of Disney song

Compilation album by Various artists
- Released: May 20, 2008
- Recorded: February 2007 – March 2008
- Genre: Pop
- Length: 52:19
- Label: Walt Disney
- Producers: Jay Landers, Bryan Todd

Disneymania album chronology
Disneymania 5 (2007)	Disneymania 6 (2008)	Princess Disneymania (2008)

Disneymania 6 is the sixth installment in the Disneymania series. It features contemporary performers' takes on classic Disney songs. It was released on May 20, 2008.

== Track listing ==
#	Title	Performer(s)	Film	Length
1	"If I Didn't Have You"	Mitchel Musso & Emily Osment	Monsters, Inc.	3:06
2	"That's How You Know"	Demi Lovato	Enchanted	3:13
3	"Some Day My Prince Will Come"	The Cheetah Girls	Snow White and the Seven Dwarfs	3:27
4	"Kiss the Girl"	Colbie Caillat	The Little Mermaid	3:17
5	"Cruella de Vil"	Selena Gomez	101 Dalmatians	3:20
6	"Real Gone"	Billy Ray Cyrus	Cars	3:32
7	"Can You Feel the Love Tonight"	Elliott Yamin	The Lion King	5:23
8	"He Lives in You"	Elijah Kelley	Rhythm of the Pride Lands	4:00
9	"You'll Be in My Heart"	Drew Seeley	Tarzan	3:36
10	"When You Wish upon a Star"	Kate Voegele	Pinocchio	2:45
11	"Reflection"	Keke Palmer	Mulan	3:39
12	"When I See an Elephant Fly"	Plain White T's	Dumbo	1:54
13	"Ever Ever After"	Jordan Pruitt	Enchanted	3:12
14	"My Strongest Suit"	Kaycee Stroh	Aida	3:49
15	"A Dream Is a Wish Your Heart Makes"	Nikki Blonsky	Cinderella	4:01

== Singles ==
1. Selena Gomez - "Cruella de Vil"
2. Demi Lovato - "That's How You Know"
3. Colbie Caillat - "Kiss the Girl"
4. Billy Ray Cyrus - "Real Gone"

== Music videos ==
1. If I Didn't Have You
2. Kiss the Girl
3. Cruella de Vil - used for the 101 Dalmatians Platinum Edition DVD
4. Real Gone
5. That's How You Know (Live at the 2008 Disney Channel Games)

== Charts ==
Chart (2008)	Peak position	Sales	Certifications
U.S. Billboard 200	33	106,000	—
