= Disneymania 3 =

Compilation album by Various artists
- Released: February 15, 2005
- Recorded: Summer 2003 – Fall 2004
- Genre: Pop
- Length: 48:33
- Label: Walt Disney
- Producer: Jay Landers

Disneymania album chronology
Disneymania 2 (2004)	Disneymania 3 (2005)	Disneyremixmania (2005)

Disneymania 3 is the third installment in the Disneymania album series presenting songs from Disney films, performed by various musical artists. The album was released on February 15, 2005, and was certified Gold soon after. It peaked at #30 on the Billboard 200, one spot behind its predecessor Disneymania 2.

== Track listing ==
#	Title	Performer(s)	Original source	Length
1	"Under the Sea"	Raven-Symoné	The Little Mermaid	3:15
2	"Hawaiian Roller Coaster Ride"	Jump5	Lilo & Stitch	3:04
3	"A Whole New World"	Nick Lachey and Jessica Simpson	Aladdin	4:11
4	"It's a Small World" (RapMania! Mix)	Fan 3	It's a Small World	3:01
5	"The Bare Necessities"	Bowling for Soup	The Jungle Book	3:38
6	"I Won't Say (I'm in Love)"	The Cheetah Girls	Hercules	3:03
7	"Zip-a-Dee-Doo-Dah"	Aly & AJ	Song of the South	2:54
8	"Kiss the Girl"	Vitamin C	The Little Mermaid	2:43
9	"Part of Your World"	Skye Sweetnam	The Little Mermaid	2:33
10	"Colors of the Wind"	Christy Carlson Romano	Pocahontas	3:58
11	"Proud of Your Boy"	Clay Aiken	Aladdin	2:19
12	"Strangers Like Me"	Everlife	Tarzan	3:32
13	"A Dream Is a Wish Your Heart Makes"	Kimberley Locke	Cinderella	4:41
14	"Cruella de Vil"	Lalaine	101 Dalmatians	2:38
15	"When You Wish Upon a Star"	Jesse McCartney	Pinocchio	3:03

== Critical reception ==
Professional ratings
Review scores
Source	Rating
Allmusic	3/5 stars

Allmusic gave the album a rating of 3 stars out of 5, writing "As with all the Disneymania comps, the quality of the performances is all over the place, ranging from highlights like Bowling for Soup's cheeky, punky take on The Jungle Book's 'Bare Necessities' to missteps like Jesse McCartney's whiny version of 'When You Wish Upon a Star'...Like the volumes that came before it, Disneymania, Vol. 3 isn't perfect, but fans of Disney's current pop stars should find at least a few enjoyable moments here."

== Singles ==
1. "Under the Sea" - Raven-Symoné
2. "A Whole New World" - Jessica Simpson & Nick Lachey - released to promote Aladdin Platinum Edition
3. "I Won't Say (I'm in Love)" - The Cheetah Girls
4. "Zip-A-Dee-Doo-Dah" - Aly & AJ
5. "Cruella De Vil" - Lalaine
6. "Hawaiian Roller Coaster Ride" - Jump5, released to promote Lilo & Stitch 2: Stitch Has a Glitch

== Music videos ==
1. "Under the Sea" - Raven-Symoné
2. "Hawaiian Roller Coaster Ride" - Jump5
3. "A Whole New World" - Jessica Simpson & Nick Lachey
4. "Part of Your World" - Skye Sweetnam
5. "Proud of Your Boy" - Clay Aiken
6. "Strangers Like Me" - Everlife

== Disneymania 3 in Concert ==
Disneymania 3 in Concert was a live event held at Disney's California Adventure on January 29 and 30, 2005. Prior to its DVD release, the concerts were broadcast on Music Choice via DirecTV in April 2005.

1. "Under the Sea" - Raven-Symoné (Originally from The Little Mermaid)

Introduction Welcome from Raven

1. "Grazin' in the Grass" - Raven-Symoné (From The Lion King 1½)

Inside the Studio with Raven on "Under the Sea"

1. "It's a Small World" - Fan 3 (Originally from the 1964 New York World's Fair/Disneyland Attraction, It's a Small World)
2. "A Dream is a Wish Your Heart Makes" - Kimberly Locke (Originally from Cinderella)
3. "8th World Wonder" - Kimberly Locke
4. "Kiss the Girl" - Vitamin C (Originally from The Little Mermaid)

Inside the Studio with Lalaine on "Cruella de Vil"

1. "Cruella de Vil" - Lalaine (Originally from 101 Dalmatians)

Inside the Studio with Skye Sweetnam on "Part of Your World"* Inside the Studio with Christy Carlson Romano on "Colors of the Wind"

1. "Colors of the Wind" - Christy Carlson Romano (Originally from Pocahontas)
2. "Strangers Like Me" - Everlife (Originally from Tarzan)
3. "Dive In" - Christy Carlson Romano

Inside the Studio with Aly & AJ on "Zip-a-Dee-Doo-Dah"

1. "Zip-A-Dee-Doo-Dah" - Aly & AJ (Originally from Song of the South)*

Inside the Studio with The Cheetah Girls on "I Won't Say (I'm in Love)"

1. "I Won't Say (I'm in Love)" - The Cheetah Girls (Originally from Hercules)
- Notice that Skye Sweetnam and Aly & AJ never actually take the stage.
- Lalaine also performed her single "I'm Not Your Girl", but the performance was omitted from the DVD release.

== Chart positions ==
Album	Chart Position		
Album	Billboard 200	Top Internet Albums	Top Kids Audio
Disneymania 3	#30	#46	#1
