= Disneymania 5 =

Compilation album by various artists
- Released: March 27, 2007
- Genre: Pop
- Length: 53:18
- Label: Walt Disney
- Producers: Jay Landers; Matthew Wilder

Disneymania albums chronology
Disneymania 4 (2006)	Disneymania 5 (2007)	Disneymania 6 (2008)

Disneymania 5 is the fifth installment in the Disneymania series, released on March 27, 2007. The album features four of the stars from High School Musical: Vanessa Hudgens, Lucas Grabeel, Ashley Tisdale, Corbin Bleu and from High School Musical: The Concert, Drew Seeley among others. The album debuted on the Billboard 200 at 14.

== Track listing ==
#	Title	Performer(s)	Film	Length
1	"Part of Your World"	Miley Cyrus	The Little Mermaid	2:34
2	"Two Worlds"	Corbin Bleu	Tarzan	3:35
3	"So This Is Love"	The Cheetah Girls	Cinderella	3:39
4	"I Wan'na Be Like You"	Jonas Brothers	The Jungle Book	2:47
5	"When She Loved Me"	Jordan Pruitt	Toy Story 2	3:19
6	"Kiss the Girl"	Ashley Tisdale	The Little Mermaid	3:24
7	"The Second Star to the Right"	T-Squad	Peter Pan	2:51
8	"Cruella de Vil"	Hayden Panettiere	101 Dalmatians	3:18
9	"Colors of the Wind"	Vanessa Hudgens	Pocahontas	3:58
10	"Go the Distance"	Lucas Grabeel	Hercules	3:51
11	"The Siamese Cat Song"	B5	Lady and the Tramp	3:07
12	"Reflection"	Everlife	Mulan	3:42
13	"Let's Get Together"	The Go-Go's	The Parent Trap	2:36
14	"True to Your Heart"	Keke Palmer	Mulan	3:25
15	"Find Yourself"	Drew Seeley	Cars	3:21

== Critical reception ==
Professional ratings
Review scores
Source	Rating
Tommy2.net	3/4 stars

Allmusic said "Popular music stars belt out Disney songs in their signature styles on this extremely danceable disc. Five cast members from High School Musical add to the fun with "Two Worlds", "Colors of the Wind", "Kiss the Girl", "Go the Distance" and "Find Yourself", while B5 provides an exciting rendition of the "Siamese Cat Song." Fifteen tracks are included in total."

== Charts ==
Disneymania 5 is the highest charting album of the series, peaking at number 14, one position above Disneymania 4. However, it had the second lowest first week sales (behind Disneyremixmania).

Chart (2007)	Peak position
U.S. Billboard 200	14
U.S. Top Kids Audio	1

== Singles ==
1. "Kiss the Girl" - Ashley Tisdale - released to promote The Little Mermaid Special edition
2. "So This Is Love" - The Cheetah Girls
3. "The Second Star to the Right" - T-Squad - released to promote Peter Pan Platinum edition
4. "Colors of the Wind" - Vanessa Hudgens
5. "I Wanna Be Like You" - Jonas Brothers - released to promote The Jungle Book Platinum edition
6. "Go the Distance" - Lucas Grabeel

== Music videos ==
1. "Kiss The Girl" - Ashley Tisdale
2. "So This is Love" - The Cheetah Girls
3. "The Second Star To The Right" - T-Squad
4. "I Wanna Be Like You" - Jonas Brothers
