= Disneymania 2 =

Compilation album by Various artists
- Released: January 27, 2004
- Genre: Pop
- Length: 48:29
- Label: Walt Disney
- Producer: Jay Landers

Disneymania album chronology
Disneymania (2002)	Disneymania 2 (2004)	Disneymania 3 (2005)

Disneymania 2 is the second installment in the Disneymania album series. The album features classic songs primarily from Disney films performed by various contemporary musical artists. Much like its predecessor, Disneymania, Disneymania 2 was commercially successful, peaking at number 29 on the Billboard 200 and being certified Gold in November 2005.

== Background ==
To promote the compilation, a promotional video of "True To Your Heart" performed by Raven-Symoné was produced. A number of songs on the album were previously released to promote DVD re-releases of Disney films and had music videos produced. These songs include "Circle of Life" by Disney Channel Circle of Stars, "Anytime You Need a Friend" by The Beu Sisters, "Once Upon (Another) Dream" by No Secrets, and "I Wan'na Be Like You" by Nikki Webster.

== Critical reception ==
Allmusic gave the album a rating of 3 out of 5 stars, writing "While many Disney classics were already given this treatment on the first Disneymania, this trip back to the well isn't entirely dry; for every uninspired cover like Jump5's "Welcome," there are fun reinterpretations like the Baha Men's "It's a Small World" and the Beu Sisters' "He's a Tramp." Not surprisingly, the oldest, best-known Disney songs hold up the best after their teen pop makeovers: even though it's saddled with an overwrought techno arrangement". The site concluded "While it's an uneven album and not as strong as its predecessor, Disneymania, Vol. 2 still has enough entertaining moments to make it worth a listen."

Professional ratings
Review scores
Source	Rating
Allmusic	3/5 stars

== Track listing ==
#	Title	Performer(s)	Original source	Length
1	"Welcome"	Jump5	Brother Bear	3:15
2	"True to Your Heart"	Raven	Mulan	3:45
3	"It's a Small World"	Baha Men	It's a Small World	2:44
4	"He's a Tramp"	The Beu Sisters	Lady and the Tramp	2:56
5	"Zip-a-Dee-Doo-Dah"	Stevie Brock	Song of the South	3:30
6	"The Siamese Cat Song"	Hilary Duff & Haylie Duff	Lady and the Tramp	3:50
7	"Circle of Life"	Disney Channel Circle of Stars	The Lion King	4:10
8	"A Whole New World"	LMNT	Aladdin	4:05
9	"Once Upon (Another) Dream"	No Secrets	Sleeping Beauty	3:30
10	"Anytime You Need a Friend"	The Beu Sisters	Home on the Range	3:20
11	"The Second Star to the Right"	Jesse McCartney	Peter Pan	3:02
12	"When You Wish Upon a Star"	Ashley Gearing	Pinocchio	3:57
13	"A Dream Is a Wish Your Heart Makes"	Daniel Bedingfield	Cinderella	3:40
14	"Baroque Hoedown"	They Might Be Giants	Main Street Electrical Parade	2:45
15	"I Wan'na Be Like You" ^{^}	Nikki Webster	The Jungle Book	2:49

- ^{^} Bonus Australian Track

== Charts ==
Chart (2007)	Peak position
U.S. Billboard 200	29
U.S. Top Internet Albums	52
U.S. Top Kids Audio	1

== Certifications ==
Certifications for "Disneymania 2"
Region	Certification	Certified units/sales
United States (RIAA)	Gold	500,000^{^}
^{^} Shipments figures based on certification alone.

== Disneymania in Concert ==
- "True To Your Heart" - Raven-Symoné
- Welcome from Raven
- "The Second Star To The Right" - Jesse McCartney
- Backstage Interview with Jesse McCartney
- "Beautiful Soul" - Jesse McCartney
- "Anytime You Need A Friend" Music Video - The Beu Sisters
- "He's A Tramp" - The Beu Sisters
- Backstage Interviews with The Beu Sisters
- "Anytime You Need A Friend" - The Beu Sisters (From Home on the Range)
- Ashanti and Lil Sis Shi Shi's Colors of the Wind music video
- "Best Day of My Life" - Jesse McCartney
- "Shine" - Raven-Symoné (from "That's So Raven")
- Studio Interview with Stevie Brock
- "Zip-A-Dee-Doo-Dah" - Stevie Brock
- Circle of Life - Disney Channel Circle of Stars music video
- "All for Love" - Stevie Brock
- Backstage Interview with Stevie Brock
- "Supernatural" - Raven-Symoné

Note that Ashanti and Lil' Sis Shi Shi and Disney Channel Circle of Stars never take the stage.
