= Disneymania =

Compilation album by Various artists
- Released: September 17, 2002
- Recorded: 1998–2002
- Genre: Pop
- Length: 52:47
- Label: Walt Disney
- Producer: Jay Landers

Disneymania album chronology
Disneymania (2002)	Disneymania 2 (2004)

Disneymania is the first album in the Disneymania series featuring various musical artists performing classic Disney songs. The original album, released on September 17, 2002, featured contemporary Disney classics. It peaked at number 29 on the Billboard 200 and was certified gold by the RIAA in February 2003. Singles released from the album were "I Wanna Be Like You" by Smash Mouth and "Beauty and the Beast" by Jump5. The album also includes "Reflection" by Christina Aguilera, which was released as a single years prior in 1998.

== Track listing ==
#	Title	Performer(s)	Film	Length
1	"Someday My Prince Will Come"	Anastacia	Snow White and the Seven Dwarfs	3:45
2	"Under the Sea"	A*Teens	The Little Mermaid	3:25
3	"You'll Be in My Heart"	Usher	Tarzan	4:12
4	"When You Wish Upon a Star"	N'Sync	Pinocchio	2:22
5	"Colors of the Wind"	Ashanti & Lil' Sis Shi Shi	Pocahontas	3:46
6	"I Wan'na Be Like You"	Smash Mouth	The Jungle Book	3:17
7	"Part of Your World"	Jessica Simpson	The Little Mermaid	3:28
8	"I Just Can't Wait to Be King"	Aaron Carter	The Lion King	3:26
9	"Can You Feel the Love Tonight"	S Club	The Lion King	4:11
10	"Hakuna Matata"	Baha Men	The Lion King	3:43
11	"The Tiki Tiki Tiki Room"	Hilary Duff	The Enchanted Tiki Room	2:44
12	"Beauty and the Beast"	Jump5	Beauty and the Beast	3:28
13	"Kiss the Girl"	No Secrets	The Little Mermaid	3:14
14	"Reflection"	Christina Aguilera	Mulan	3:34
15	"Circle of Life"	Ronan Keating	The Lion King	4:43
16	"A Whole New World" ^{1}	Sweetbox	Aladdin	3:22

- ^{1} bonus Japanese track

== Critical reception ==
AllMusic gave the album a rating of 3 out of 5 stars, noting "some of pop's biggest names have been handed over music from numerous Disney flicks (with most of the emphasis being on '80s and '90s fare), and then asked to give them totally new makeovers". It described the interpretations as "infusing a light trip-hop beat", "bouncy", "beeping electronics", "soulful", "pumping in beats", "a cappella", "'Footloose'-like spin, "understated", and "measured".

== Charts ==
=== Weekly charts ===
Chart (2007)	Peak position
U.S. Billboard 200	29
U.S. Top Kids Audio	1

== Certifications ==
Certifications for "Disneymania"
Region	Certification	Certified units/sales
United States (RIAA)	Gold	500,000^{^}
^{^} Shipments figures based on certification alone.
