= Disneymania 4 =

DisneyMania 4

Compilation album by Various artists
- Released: April 4, 2006
- Genre: Pop
- Length: 50:10
- Label: Walt Disney
- Producers: Jay Landers; Dani Markman; Andrew Lane

Disneymania album chronology
Disneyremixmania (2005)	DisneyMania 4 (2006)	Disneymania 5 (2007)

Disneymania 4 is the fourth in the Disneymania series. This is the second Disneymania album with the Disney Channel Circle of Stars (though the album just calls them "Disney Channel Stars"), with a few additions, such as Dylan and Cole Sprouse, from The Suite Life of Zack & Cody. Other artists include Jonas Brothers, Teddy Geiger, and B5. The album became the second highest-peaking album in the series (behind Disneymania 5 which debuted and peaked at #14), peaking at #15 on the Billboard 200 and was certified Gold by the RIAA. To date, the album has sold over 717,000 copies, according to HITS Daily Double.

== Track listing ==
#	Title	Performer(s)	Film	Length
1	"A Dream Is a Wish Your Heart Makes"	Disney Channel Stars	Cinderella	3:46
2	"Zip-a-Dee-Doo-Dah"	Miley Cyrus	Song of the South	3:06
3	"If I Never Knew You"	The Cheetah Girls	Pocahontas	3:16
4	"Who's Afraid of the Big Bad Wolf?"	B5	Three Little Pigs	3:32
5	"Reflection" (Remix)	Christina Aguilera	Mulan	3:15
6	"I'll Try"	Jesse McCartney	Return to Never Land	3:51
7	"Look Through My Eyes"	Everlife	Brother Bear	3:11
8	"Candle on the Water"	Anneliese van der Pol	Pete's Dragon	3:08
9	"You'll Be in My Heart"	Teddy Geiger	Tarzan	4:15
10	"Yo Ho (A Pirate's Life for Me)"	Jonas Brothers	Pirates of the Caribbean	2:04
11	"Someday My Prince Will Come (feat. Drew Seeley)"	Ashley Tisdale	Snow White and the Seven Dwarfs	3:31
12	"Bahama Roller Coaster Ride"	Baha Men	Lilo & Stitch	3:30
13	"Can You Feel the Love Tonight"	Sara Paxton	The Lion King	3:40
14	"Super Cali (BoiOB Mix)"	Orlando Brown	Mary Poppins	3:32
15	"Monkey's Uncle"	Devo 2.0	The Monkey's Uncle	2:24
16	"Cruella de Vil" ^{1}	Skye Sweetnam	101 Dalmatians	2:55
17	"Go the Distance" ^{2}	K-Ci & JoJo	Hercules	4:10

- ^{1} Target Exclusive bonus track
- ^{2} Target Exclusive bonus track

== Critical reception ==
Allmusic wrote "If you and your kids want to hear some of the most memorable songs from Disney films, both classic and contemporary, done up in a modern teen-pop style, try Disneymania 4. For instance, Cinderella never sounded so danceable as on the winsome Ashley Tisdale's club-friendly "Someday My Prince Will Come," and the rock redux of "Zip-A-Dee-Doo-Dah" by Miley Cyrus will inspire many a double take. For parents with fond memories of cinematic classics, or for tweens with a crush on Teddy Geiger or the Cheetah Girls, here's the disc to bridge the generation gap."

== Charts ==
Chart (2007)	Peak position
U.S. Billboard 200	15
U.S. Top Kids Audio	2

== Singles ==
*NOTE: None of these songs were officially released as singles for the album, but as singles for the artists.

1. "A Dream Is a Wish Your Heart Makes" — Disney Channel Circle of Stars - released to promote Cinderella Platinum Edition
2. "Who's Afraid of the Big Bad Wolf" — B5
3. "If I Never Knew You" — The Cheetah Girls
4. "Super Cali (BoiOB Version)" — Orlando Brown

== Music videos ==
1. "A Dream Is a Wish Your Heart Makes" — Disney Channel Circle of Stars
2. "If I Never Knew You" — The Cheetah Girls
3. "Who's Afraid of the Big Bad Wolf" — B5
