= Toy Story 2 (soundtrack) =

Toy Story 2: An Original Walt Disney Records Soundtrack

Soundtrack album by Randy Newman
- Released: November 9, 1999
- Recorded: 1998–1999
- Genre: Film score
- Length: 47:06
- Label: Walt Disney

Randy Newman chronology
Pleasantville (1998)	Toy Story 2 (1999)	Meet the Parents (2000)

Singles from Toy Story 2: An Original Walt Disney Records Soundtrack
- 1. "Woody's Roundup" Released: November 24, 1999; 2. "You've Got a Friend in Me" Released: November 24, 1999

Professional ratings
Review scores
Source	Rating
AllMusic	3/5 stars
Empire	3/5 stars
Filmtracks.com	3/5 stars

Toy Story 2: An Original Walt Disney Records Soundtrack is the soundtrack album to the 1999 Disney/Pixar film Toy Story 2. The score for the film is composed and conducted by Randy Newman, who previously composed and conducted for its predecessor, Toy Story. It was released by Walt Disney Records on November 9, 1999. Although out of print in the U.S., the CD is available in the U.S. as an import and all but one song is available digitally.

The album features two original songs written for the film – "When She Loved Me" (the main song in the film) and "Woody's Roundup" along with Newman's score. The song from the first film "You've Got a Friend in Me", was also reused.

The music received several nominations at prominent award ceremonies, including Academy, Golden Globe, Satellite and Saturn award nominations. It won the Annie Award for Outstanding Achievement for Music in a Feature Production for Newman, and the song "When She Loved Me" won the Grammy Award for Best Song Written for a Motion Picture, Television or Other Visual Media. In addition to the awards, the track was also considered for the nomination for AFI's 100 Years...100 Songs in 2004, by the American Film Institute.

== Songs ==
Randy Newman wrote two new songs for Toy Story 2 as well as the complete original score. "When She Loved Me" is performed by Newman, along with Sarah McLachlan as the singing voice of Jessie. The track is used in the flashback montage in which Jessie experiences being loved, forgotten, then abandoned by her owner, Emily. "When She Loved Me" received praise from critics, who found the song moving and heartbreaking, praising Newman's songwriting and McLachlan's vocal performance. It earned a reputation as one of the saddest sequences in both Pixar and Disney films, as well as one of the saddest film songs ever written. The song was nominated at the Academy Awards in 2000 for Best Original Song, but the award went to Phil Collins for "You'll Be in My Heart" from another Disney animated film, Tarzan. It also lost the Golden Globe Award for Best Original Song to Collins for the same track.

Another song "Woody's Roundup" is performed by Newman and Riders in the Sky. It is the theme song for the Woody's Roundup television show, while also being used in the end-credit music. The film carried over one song from Toy Story, "You've Got a Friend in Me," sung at two different points during the film by Tom Hanks as Woody and Robert Goulet, the singing voice of Wheezy.

== Track listing ==
All tracks are written by Randy Newman.

Toy Story 2: An Original Walt Disney Records Soundtrack track listing
No.	Title	Performer(s)	Length
1.	"Woody's Roundup"	Randy Newman; Riders in the Sky (vocals)	1:53
2.	"When She Loved Me"	Newman; Sarah McLachlan (vocals)	3:05
3.	"You've Got a Friend in Me"	Newman; Robert Goulet (vocals)	2:56
4.	"Zurg's Planet"	Newman	3:39
5.	"Wheezy and the Yard Sale"	Newman	3:11
6.	"Woody's Been Stolen"	Newman	1:28
7.	"Chicken Man"	Newman	1:17
8.	"Woody's Dream"	Newman	3:55
9.	"Jessie and the Roundup Gang"	Newman	1:24
10.	"Woody's a Star"	Newman	1:28
11.	"Let's Save Woody"	Newman	2:07
12.	"Off to the Museum"	Newman	1:29
13.	"Talk to Jessie"	Newman	0:43
14.	"The Cleaner"	Newman	1:50
15.	"Al's Toy Barn"	Newman	4:00
16.	"Emperor Zurg Vs. Buzz"	Newman	2:41
17.	"Use Your Head"	Newman	4:18
18.	"Jessie's in Trouble"	Newman	2:14
19.	"Ride Like the Wind"	Newman	1:29
20.	"You've Got a Friend in Me" (Instrumental Version)	Newman; Tom Scott (saxophone)	2:59
Total length:			47:06

== Chart positions ==
Chart (1999)	Peak position
US Billboard 200	111

== Accolades ==
Year	Award	Category	Recipients	Result
2000	Academy Awards	Best Original Song	Randy Newman (for "When She Loved Me")	Nominated
2000	Saturn Awards	Best Music	Randy Newman	Nominated
2000	Annie Awards	Outstanding Individual Achievement for Music in an Animated Feature Production	Randy Newman	Won
2000	Golden Globe Awards	Best Original Song	Randy Newman (for "When She Loved Me")	Nominated
2000	Motion Picture Sound Editors	Best Sound Editing, Music – Animation	Bruno Coon & Lisa Jaime	Nominated
2000	Satellite Awards	Best Original Song	Sarah McLachlan (for "When She Loved Me")	Won
2001	Grammy Awards	Best Song Written for a Motion Picture, Television or Other Visual Media	Randy Newman (for "When She Loved Me")	Won
2001	Grammy Awards	Best Score Soundtrack Album for a Motion Picture, Television or Other Visual Media	Randy Newman	Nominated
2001	Grammy Awards	Best Country Performance by a Duo or Group with Vocal	Riders in the Sky (for "Woody's Roundup")	Nominated

== Bibliography ==
- Price, David (2008). The Pixar Touch. New York: Alfred A. Knopf. ISBN 978-0-307-26575-3.
