= Disney Channel Circle of Stars =

Music group covering Disney songs

- Origin: Disney/Walt Disney, U.S.
- Genres: Pop cover
- Years active: 2003–2005; 2014
- Label: Walt Disney
- Past members: Raven-Symoné; Hilary Duff; Anneliese van der Pol; Orlando Brown; Christy Carlson Romano; Kyla Pratt; Tahj Mowry; Adrienne Bailon; A. J. Trauth; Ashley Tisdale; Brenda Song; Dylan Sprouse; Cole Sprouse; Ricky Ullman; Amy Bruckner; Alyson Michalka; Olivia Holt; Kelli Berglund; Jake Short; Bradley Steven Perry; Kevin Chamberlin; Tyrel Jackson Williams; Sabrina Carpenter; Peyton List; Grace Phipps; Sarah Gilman; Dylan Riley Snyder; Jordan Fisher; Joey Bragg; Tenzing Norgay Trainor; Karan Brar; Austin North; Skai Jackson; Rowan Blanchard; Leo Howard; Blake Michael; Piper Curda; Leigh-Allyn Baker; Peyton Clark

Disney Channel Circle of Stars are a music group created by Disney Channel/The Walt Disney Company, that makes cover versions of Disney's songs. They recorded "Circle of Life" in 2003 and "A Dream Is a Wish Your Heart Makes" in 2005. A group of actors and actresses who have appeared in Disney Channel television series and original movies, including Hilary Duff, Raven-Symoné, Orlando Brown, Anneliese van der Pol, and Kyla Pratt, were all part of the original line-up. One or the other of these songs appeared on Disneymania 2, Disneymania 4, DisneyRemixMania, The Lion King Special Edition, and Cinderella Platinum Edition DVD.

== Members ==
Members of 2003

- Hilary Duff
- Raven-Symoné
- Anneliese van der Pol
- Orlando Brown
- Christy Carlson Romano
- Kyla Pratt
- Tahj Mowry
- A. J. Trauth

Members of 2005

- Raven-Symoné
- Anneliese van der Pol
- Orlando Brown
- Ashley Tisdale
- Dylan Sprouse
- Cole Sprouse
- Brenda Song
- Raviv Ullman
- Amy Bruckner
- Aly & AJ

Members of 2014

- Sabrina Carpenter
- Olivia Holt
- Kelli Berglund
- Jake Short
- Bradley Steven Perry
- Kevin Chamberlin
- Tyrel Jackson Williams
- Austin North
- Peyton List
- Grace Phipps
- Dylan Riley Snyder
- Jordan Fisher
- Joey Bragg
- Tenzing Norgay Trainor
- Karan Brar
- Skai Jackson
- Rowan Blanchard
- Peyton Clark
- Leo Howard
- Blake Michael
- Sarah Gilman
- Piper Curda
- Leigh-Allyn Baker

== Discography ==
=== Circle of Life ===
The lineup for "Circle of Life" included:

Star	Disney Appearances
Raven-Symoné	That's So Raven, Kim Possible, The Cheetah Girls, The Cheetah Girls 2, Zenon: Girl of the 21st Century & Zenon: Z3, Tinker Bell, Raven's Home, Big City Greens
Orlando Brown	That's So Raven, Eddie's Million Dollar Cook-Off, Fillmore! & The Proud Family, The Proud Family Movie
Hilary Duff	Lizzie McGuire, The Lizzie McGuire Movie & Cadet Kelly
Christy Carlson Romano	Even Stevens, The Even Stevens Movie, Kim Possible & Cadet Kelly
Tahj Mowry	Smart Guy, Hounded, The Poof Point & Kim Possible
Kyla Pratt	The Proud Family, The Proud Family Movie
A. J. Trauth	Even Stevens, The Even Stevens Movie & You Wish!
Anneliese van der Pol	That's So Raven, Shake It Up, Raven's Home

The song appeared on the following albums:

- 2004: DisneyMania 2
- 2004: Radio Disney Jingle Jams
- 2005: DisneyRemixMania

=== A Dream Is a Wish Your Heart Makes ===
The lineup for "A Dream Is a Wish Your Heart Makes" included:

Star	Disney Appearances
Raven-Symoné	That's So Raven, Kim Possible, The Cheetah Girls, The Cheetah Girls 2, Zenon: Girl of the 21st Century & Zenon: Z3, Tinker Bell, Raven's Home, Big City Greens
Orlando Brown	That's So Raven, Eddie's Million Dollar Cook-Off, Fillmore!, The Proud Family & The Proud Family Movie
Amy Bruckner	Phil of the Future & American Dragon: Jake Long
Alyson Michalka	Phil of the Future, Now You See It... & Cow Belles
Kyla Pratt	The Proud Family & The Proud Family Movie
Brenda Song	The Ultimate Christmas Present, Get A Clue, That's So Raven, Phil of the Future, Stuck in the Suburbs & The Suite Life of Zack & Cody, The Suite Life on Deck, Amphibia, Wendy Wu: Homecoming Warrior
Cole Sprouse	The Suite Life of Zack & Cody, The Suite Life on Deck, The Suite Life Movie
Dylan Sprouse	The Suite Life of Zack & Cody, The Suite Life on Deck, The Suite Life Movie
Ashley Tisdale	The Suite Life of Zack & Cody, High School Musical, High School Musical 2, High School Musical 3, Sharpay's Fabulous Adventure, Phineas and Ferb
Ricky Ullman	Phil of the Future & Pixel Perfect
Anneliese van der Pol	That's So Raven, Shake It Up, & Raven's Home

The song appeared on the following albums:

- 2005: Radio Disney Jingle Jams
- 2006: Disneymania 4
- 2008: Princess DisneyMania

=== Do You Want to Build a Snowman? ===
On July 20, 2014, a cover version of "Do You Want to Build a Snowman?" from Frozen featuring current members of Disney Circle of Stars was released.

The lineup for "Do You Want to Build a Snowman?" included:

Star	Disney Appearances
Olivia Holt	Kickin' It, Girl vs. Monster & I Didn't Do It
Kelli Berglund	Kickin' It, Lab Rats, Lab Rats: Elite Force & How to Build a Better Boy
Jake Short	A.N.T. Farm & Mighty Med, Lab Rats: Elite Force
Bradley Steven Perry	Good Luck Charlie, Good Luck Charlie, It's Christmas!, Mighty Med, Pants on Fire & Sharpay's Fabulous Adventure, Lab Rats: Elite Force
Peyton Clark	I Didn't Do It
Sarah Gilman	I Didn't Do It
Austin North	I Didn't Do It
Leigh-Allyn Baker	Good Luck Charlie, Good Luck Charlie, It's Christmas!, The 7D & Bad Hair Day, Hannah Montana
Kevin Chamberlin	Jessie & Teen Beach Movie
Tyrel Jackson Williams	Lab Rats & Pants on Fire
Sabrina Carpenter	Austin & Ally, Girl Meets World & Adventures in Babysitting
Rowan Blanchard	Girl Meets World, Best Friends Whenever & Invisible Sister
Peyton List	Jessie, Austin & Ally, I Didn't Do It & Bunk'd
Skai Jackson	Jessie, Austin & Ally, I Didn't Do It & Bunk'd
Karan Brar	Jessie, Bunk'd & Invisible Sister
Grace Phipps	Teen Beach Movie
Jordan Fisher	Teen Beach Movie & Liv and Maddie
Dylan Riley Snyder	Kickin' It
Leo Howard	Kickin' It
Joey Bragg	Liv and Maddie
Tenzing Norgay Trainor	Liv and Maddie
Blake Michael	Lemonade Mouth & Dog with a Blog
Piper Curda	A.N.T. Farm, Liv and Maddie, I Didn't Do It, Teen Beach 2 & Raven's Home
