= If You Can Dream =

2004 song

Song by Susan Stevens Logan, Christie Houser, Jodi Benson, Paige O'Hara, Judy Kuhn and Lea Salonga
- Released: September 21, 2004
- Genre: Pop
- Length: 4:01
- Label: Walt Disney
- Songwriters: Robbie Buchanan; Jay Landers
- Producers: Robbie Buchanan; Jay Landers

"If You Can Dream" is the first song that was originally written and recorded specifically for the Disney Princess media franchise. It was written, produced, and arranged by Robbie Buchanan and Jay Landers. It was first released on the album Disney Princess: The Ultimate Song Collection.

The song is sung from the point of view of the first eight official Disney Princesses. It has been featured on several Disney music CDs, and its music video was present on nearly every Disney Princess DVD, as either an extra or a Sing-Along and was shown several times on Disney Channel.

The song has been covered by country singer Ashley Gearing, and a shorter altered version performed by a different set of singers was featured in the Disney on Ice show Princess Wishes as the show finale from 2006 to 2018. More recently, it serves as the exit song to Disneyland Paris' nighttime show Disney Illuminations.

== Singers ==
- Susan Stevens Logan as Snow White and Cinderella
- Christie Houser as Aurora
- Jodi Benson as Ariel
- Paige O'Hara as Belle
- Judy Kuhn as Pocahontas
- Lea Salonga as Jasmine and Mulan

== Song details ==
One of the most notable aspects of the song is that all but three of the princesses's original voice actresses reprise their singing roles. Adriana Caselotti, Ilene Woods, and Mary Costa do not reprise their roles as Snow White, Cinderella, and Aurora. Lea Salonga, who provided the singing voice of both Jasmine and Mulan reprised both roles in this song.

Each princess sings lyrics that reference their own story. For example, one of Cinderella's lines is "One day the slipper fits, then you see the love in his eyes," one of Belle's lines is "So the story goes, never die the rose...," Pocahontas' primary line being "The colors of the wind will lead my heart right back to you..." and one of Jasmine's lines being "There's a whole new world waiting there for us".

In the Princess Wishes Disney on Ice show, the line "The colors of the wind will lead my heart right back to you," is changed to "The music of the wind will lead my heart right back to you," since Pocahontas is absent from the show. The show also changes the lines from "So the story goes/Never die the rose" to "Once upon a dream/Wish and it will seem". While these lines were originally sung by Belle, the altered ones were given to Aurora in order for her to have a solo part.

Orchestral arrangements for the song were provided by Alan Silvestri's frequent collaborator, William Ross.

== Music video ==
The music video for the song consists of footage arranged in a montage from the films the featured girls are originally from including Snow White and the Seven Dwarfs, Cinderella, Sleeping Beauty, The Little Mermaid, Beauty and the Beast, Aladdin, Pocahontas and Mulan. The footage was edited by Industrial Light & Magic in an attempt to make the princesses mouth movements lipsync with their respective song vocals.

Fan videos were also made in 2021 and 2023 and was uploaded on YouTube featuring footages from live action films that featured the princesses portrayed by Elle Fanning (Aurora in the 2014 film Maleficent and its sequel Maleficent: Mistress of Evil released in 2019), Lily James (Cinderella in the 2015 remake), Emma Watson (Belle in 2017 remake), Naomi Scott (Jasmine in the 2019 remake of Aladdin), Liu Yifei (Mulan in the 2020 remake), and Halle Bailey (Ariel in the 2023 remake). Only Snow White and Pocahontas did not appear as the live action film for Snow White was released in 2025 portrayed by Rachel Zegler, while there are no plans for a live action remake of the latter.
