= Princess Disneymania =

Compilation album by Various artists
- Released: September 30, 2008
- Recorded: 1998–2008
- Genre: Pop
- Length: 47:15
- Label: Walt Disney

Disneymania album chronology
Disneymania 6 (2008)	Princess Disneymania (2008)	Disneymania 7 (2010)

Princess Disneymania is Disney's first compilation album in the Disneymania series. It was released on September 30, 2008. The album features various artists renditions of classic songs originally from the Disney Princess films.

Emily Osment's cover of "Once Upon a Dream", is the only previously unreleased song on the compilation, the song was also used to promote Sleeping Beauty's Platinum Edition DVD release, which was released the following month. Kari Kimmel, Amy Adams, and Sierra Boggess' contributions on the compilation were all taken from their respective soundtrack albums Ella Enchanted, Enchanted, and The Little Mermaid: Original Broadway Cast Recording, all the other songs on the compilation were previously released on a Disneymania album and are mainly sung by female artists. The album, like its predecessors, received mixed reviews from music critics. Some praised its collection of beloved Disney songs performed by popular artists, while others dismissed it as unoriginal and criticized its over-reliance on previously released material.

The album became the lowest-peaking of the series, peaking at #191 on the Billboard 200.

== Track listing ==
#	Title	Performer(s)	Film	Length
1	"Once Upon a Dream"	Emily Osment	Sleeping Beauty	3:32
2	"That's How You Know"	Demi Lovato	Enchanted	3:12
3	"Some Day My Prince Will Come"	Ashley Tisdale	Snow White and the Seven Dwarfs	3:30
4	"Colors of the Wind"	Vanessa Hudgens	Pocahontas	3:58
5	"Reflection"	Christina Aguilera	Mulan	3:33
6	"So This Is Love"	The Cheetah Girls	Cinderella	3:40
7	"Kiss the Girl"	Colbie Caillat	The Little Mermaid	3:16
8	"It's Not Just Make Believe"	Kari Kimmel	Ella Enchanted	3:06
9	"Under the Sea"	Raven-Symoné	The Little Mermaid	3:15
10	"Ever Ever After"	Jordan Pruitt	Enchanted	3:12
11	"True to Your Heart"	Keke Palmer	Mulan	3:22
12	"Happy Working Song"	Amy Adams	Enchanted	2:09
13	"Part of Your World"	Sierra Boggess	The Little Mermaid: Musical	3:23
14	"A Dream Is a Wish Your Heart Makes"	Disney Channel Stars	Cinderella	3:46

== Critical reception ==
"Princess Disneymania" received mixed reviews from music critics. Allmusic said "This collection features an assortment of beloved songs from classic Disney tales of love and enchantment performed by the biggest names in pop music. Standouts include former Mouseketeer Christina Aguilera’s career-making ballad, "Reflection," from MULAN; Raven-Symone delivering an almost brassy take on the always uplifting "Under the Sea" from THE LITTLE MERMAID; and delightful Oscar-nominated actress Amy Adams's sprightly take on a "Happy Working Song" from ENCHANTED."

== Charts ==
Chart (2008)	Peak position
U.S. Billboard 200	191
U.S. Top Compilation Albums	5
U.S. Top Kids Audio	5
