= When She Loved Me =

Song by Sarah McLachlan

from the album Toy Story 2: An Original Walt Disney Records Soundtrack
- Released: November 24, 1999
- Recorded: 1999
- Studio: The Warehouse Studio (Vancouver, British Columbia)
- Genre: Pop
- Length: 3:05
- Label: Walt Disney
- Songwriter: Randy Newman
- Producers: Newman; McLachlan

"When She Loved Me" is a song written by American musician Randy Newman and recorded by Canadian singer Sarah McLachlan for Pixar's animated film Toy Story 2 (1999). The song is sung from the perspective of character Jessie, a toy cowgirl, as she reveals her backstory by reflecting upon her defunct relationship with her original owner, Emily, who outgrew her. Heard in the film during a flashback sequence, the filmmakers decided to incorporate a song into the montage during which Jessie details her backstory to Woody after multiple attempts to show the character relaying her experience verbally proved unsuccessful.

Newman initially felt that the song was inappropriate, doubting that young children would be interested in it; he changed his mind after screen tests showed promising results. The song was offered to McLachlan after Newman and the filmmakers agreed that the ballad was more appropriate for a female artist. Despite some hesitation from her management, McLachlan greatly enjoyed the ballad and agreed to record it upon hearing Newman's demo, finding herself drawn towards its melancholy nature. Musically, "When She Loved Me" is an emotional pop ballad backed by simple piano accompaniment. Various interpretations of the song's lyrics and themes have been offered; while written primarily about the pain felt upon losing a platonic friend, "When She Loved Me" has also been interpreted as a love song, while some music journalists consider the track to be a metaphor for children inevitably growing up and becoming independent from their parents.

"When She Loved Me" has garnered critical acclaim from film and music critics, who found the song to be both moving and heartbreaking, praising Newman's songwriting and McLachlan's vocal performance. "When She Loved Me" won a Grammy Award for Best Song Written for a Motion Picture, Television or Other Visual Media. The song was nominated for Golden Globe and Academy Awards for Best Original Song. "When She Loved Me" has since earned a reputation as one of the saddest sequences in both Pixar and Disney films, as well as one of the saddest film songs ever written. The song has been covered by several artists, including Steve Tyrell, Bridgit Mendler and the musical group Steps.

== Writing and recording ==
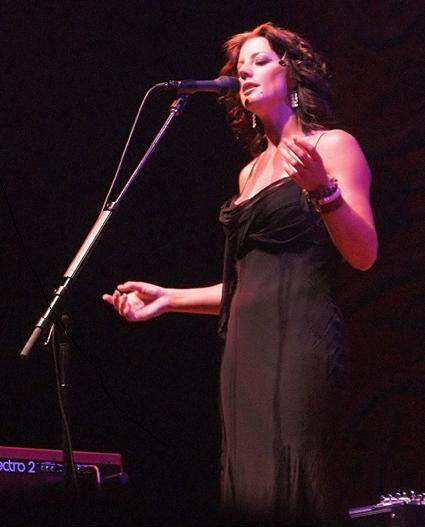
Pixar hired Canadian singer Sarah McLachlan to record "When She Loved Me" for Toy Story 2.

Beginning with Toy Story (1995), director John Lasseter had long decided Pixar films would not be musicals, but agreed that musician Randy Newman would write original songs for certain story moments, most of which Newman would sing himself. Toy Story 2's filmmakers originally struggled to have Jessie, a toy cowgirl, simply convey her backstory with dialogue, eventually reworking her thoughts into a song called "When She Loved Me". Pixar tasked Newman with writing a song expressing Jessie's disappointment in her former owner as the latter grows up, with the songwriter only knowing the song's required length and gender. Lasseter described the addition of Jessie's song as the most significant change the film underwent during production. Newman initially doubted a song about being loved versus unloved would work in a children's film, and Disney had expressed concerns about losing audience interest during slow songs in the past. At a Toy Story 2 test screening, Newman was surprised to find that even the youngest children appeared to remain attentive during the song, despite its slow tempo and mature, emotional themes. Newman confirmed that the song was not the first time Pixar had proved him wrong, and admitted to being proudest of the work he did on "When She Loved Me" for the film.

Alongside "Woody's Roundup", "When She Loved Me" was one of two songs Newman wrote for Toy Story 2. Originally called "Jessie's Song", Newman's demo was shorter than the final version, with slightly different lyrics. He considers "When She Loved Me" to be among his favorite film compositions and one of the best songs he has written for a movie, and found it easier than writing for his own studio albums because of Disney's clear vision and instructions. Lasseter also allowed him a lot of freedom with the song. Although Newman maintains that the song is almost exclusively about the relationship between a doll and her estranged owner, he admitted that some of his own experiences were incorporated. Unlike the songs he had written for Toy Story, Newman does not sing "When She Loved Me" himself because Pixar wanted a female singer, and enlisted Canadian singer Sarah McLachlan to provide Jessie's off-screen singing voice in lieu of her voice actress Joan Cusack. Newman likened writing for McLachlan's voice as opposed to himself to "writing for a different instrument", describing hers as "a voice that can hold notes" compared to his own.

McLachlan's manager warned her that she might not like "When She Loved Me" when they received it, and she claims her manager described it as "kind of weird". McLachlan ultimately immediately cried upon hearing it for the first time, saying Newman's demo reminded her of Jim Henson's original performance of "Bein' Green" as Kermit the Frog. McLachlan felt confident that mothers would be incredibly moved by the song regardless of how children reacted. McLachlan found the recording process different than what she had grown accustomed to owing to the number of people involved in an animated film. Newman and McLachlan recorded approximately 17 takes of the song before finally deciding upon a few with which they were satisfied. They produced the song together, with Newman arranging and orchestrating. They completed it within a few days. Both Newman's piano accompaniment and McLachlan's vocals were recorded by producer Greg Reely at The Warehouse Studio in Vancouver, British Columbia. The singer described the song as a favorite of hers and considers the project a highlight of her career.

Actors Tom Hanks and Tim Allen, the voices of Woody and Buzz Lightyear, respectively, were moved to tears upon watching "When She Loved Me" for the first time.

== Context and use in Toy Story 2 ==
Serving as a "haunting soundtrack to Jessie's tale of abandonment", "When She Loved Me" is Toy Story 2's main song, and plays over a montage showing of Jessie and her former owner Emily. Heard approximately midway through the film, the song is sung in-character and off-screen by Jessie during a flashback in which she recalls the moment she is abandoned by Emily, reflecting upon their once-loving relationship and the good times they shared until Jessie is gradually outgrown and ultimately donated to charity in a cardboard box. The montage was animated by Tasha Wedeen. According to co-director Ash Brannon, the scene is "an example of perfect animation casting". In addition to the sequel having more female animators than Toy Story, Brannon found it helpful that a woman animated Jessie, believing no one could have done it better than Wedeen. Specific lighting effects and filters were used throughout the sequence to complement its mood, including sun-kissed lighting.

Earlier in the film, Woody is stolen from a yard sale by Al McWhiggin, a toy collector, in order to complete his collection of vintage Woody's Roundup toys. A Japanese toy museum is willing to purchase Woody and the rest of the retired Woody's Roundup cast for a lucrative sum, each of whom have become collector's items since the show's cancellation. Most of the toys long to travel to the museum in order to avoid spending their remaining lives in storage, but Woody is hesitant, and the museum will only accept the toys as a complete set. Jessie is particularly adamant that it would be best to relocate to the museum. While Woody explains that he is eager to return home to his rightful owner Andy, preferring to be loved while risking damage and abandonment as opposed to being immortalized in a museum, Jessie finally reveals that she herself once had an owner much like Andy by whom she was treasured, before ultimately being discarded. Before the song begins, Woody tells Jessie about his relationship with Andy, which prompts her to share her own embittered experience with Emily, the only person she had ever truly cared about. Seated on a window sill, Jessie perfectly interprets Woody's feelings for Andy: "when [Andy] plays with you it's like, even though you're not moving, you feel like you're alive, 'cos that's how he sees you", Describing Emily as her "whole world", Jessie proceeds to explain to Woody both the joys and tragedies associated with being loved by a child, having once been Emily's favorite toy before her interests change as she grows older, turning towards music and makeup instead, and increasingly neglecting Jessie in the process, including forgetting her underneath her bed. Emily's cowgirl-themed possessions are gradually replaced with makeup and music albums. Before the scene ends, it offers Jessie (and audiences) a moment of false hope by showing the doll being rediscovered, retrieved from underneath Emily's bed and held as though she is about to be played with once again, only to be placed inside a cardboard box and left on the side of a road to be donated to charity. Jessie believes all toys eventually "outlive their usefulness"; to her, the idea of relocating to Japan "means that she will provide pleasure again and have some purpose in life." Sky TV described the scene as "Jessie's wistful trip down Memory Lane". The song also develops Jessie and Woody's relationship; Jessie finds the courage to tell Woody her story, explaining her apprehension towards the idea of having an owner, while Woody becomes a compassionate listener by learning about how she had become a collectible in the first place. Jessie's sadness is used "as the anchor to keep Woody in place", making him torn between which decision to make upon listening to Jessie's story. Later in the film, Jessie must make a choice of her own to either forsake immortality in favor of being loved by a child once again. BBC Online summarized the song's use in the film as "girl meets toy, girl loves toy, girl grows up, toy is left out for recycling."

Slant Magazine's Aaron Cutler identified "When She Loved Me" as one of the "few moments of melancholia" in an otherwise lighthearted film. Tim Greiving of NPR said the song underscores a montage about "losing the most important person in the world to you". For The Ringer, the same writer said "When She Loved Me" mirrors how Toy Story's creators had matured and slowed down in tandem with the films. Describing the song as "a fundamental Disney moment", Lasseter himself explained, "It's like Walt [Disney] once said, for every laugh there should be a tear and for every tear a laugh." During this song, the audience learns about the origins of Jessie's "deep abandonment issues". Paste contributor Tim Grierson expressed that the toy "isn't just singing ... she's expressing a very human fear of abandonment that's backed up by decades of [Randy] Newman's previous scarred protagonists." On the Track: A Guide to Contemporary Film Scoring author Fred Karlin agreed that the song "gives Jessie's statement not only a specific emotionality, but also a universal one." Daly described "When She Loved Me" as the "weepiest moment" in the Toy Story trilogy, while Michael Mallory of the Los Angeles Times believes that both the song "encompasses the film's key message". Contributors to the book Toy Story: How Pixar Reinvented the Animated Feature found "When She Loved Me" to be the "tragic inverse" of the series' theme song "You've Got a Friend in Me" due to its melancholy tone and outlook. Set nearly in the center of the original Toy Story trilogy, GamesRadar+ contributor Simon Kinnear identified the scene as the point where the series transitions "from a tale of childhood imagination to a mature reflection on growing up". Tim Grierson of Cracked said it underlines the franchise's "acknowledgement that time marches on, kids grow up, and relationships change". The Nashville Scene opined that although "The scene is shot from a toy's point of view ... the primal fear it expresses—of fading from a child's memory as he or she grows older—is only too parental." Similar, Consequence of Sound contributor Allison Shoemaker wrote "The sequence manages to convey not only the ache of being left behind by someone you love, but the inevitable tragedy of growing up (and getting old). We all leave our childish things behind."

== Music and lyrics ==
"When She Loved Me" is a pop song with light country influences that lasts a duration of three minutes and five seconds. Written in the key of F major, "When She Loved Me" is performed "tenderly" and "very freely" at a tempo of 75 beats per minute. A piano ballad, the song uses simple background accompaniment. Its melody has been described as "sad" and "aching". Sean Daly of the Tampa Bay Times described the ballad as a song that "captures the beauty of growing up and, for parents, the beauty of letting go". Newman himself described the song as a "slow ... and sort of grown-up emotional" track about the difference between feeling loved and unloved. CD Universe compared the ballad to the works of composer Aaron Copland and singer Fats Domino. According to Ellen A. Kim of Hollywood.com, "When She Loved Me" is a simple, somber song that McLachlan performs with "aching wistfulness". Similarly, Mary Colurso of AL.com called the track a "wistful ballad". BBC Online observed that, unlike Newman's previous film compositions that use tempo to convey emotion, Newman instead enlists McLachlan "to sing the eternal ache of being abandoned". Ben Pobjie, a writer for Medium, observed that the singer's "silken Canadian pipes turn a desperately sad song into a real wrist-slitter," comparing it to Newman's own "I Will Go Sailing No More" from the first film. According to Brad Green of Urban Cinefile, the ballad is a lament about "platonic, unconditional and enchantingly innocent love", themes he believes are seldom explored in mainstream pop music. According to Ellen Hunt of The Guardian, "When She Loved Me" most closely resembles Newman's own work outside of Pixar.

The term "heartbreaking" is often used to describe the song; Arkansas Online deemed the track "bittersweet". Described as "a heart-wrenching lament about being left behind", the song's lyrics begin, "When somebody loved me, ev'rything was beautiful", followed by "Every hour spent together lives within my heart". McLachlan movingly sings the line "I was left alone. Still I waited for the day when she'd say I will always love you". Despite having been written about "that fragile bond between child and favorite toy", the song's lyrics are open to universal interpretations. Richard Walters, editor of the book The Singer's Musical Theatre Anthology - Teen's Edition: Tenor, believes that the song "takes on a different meaning" in the event that it is separated from the plot of the film and performed by a male vocalist. Thomas S. Hischak, author of The Disney Song Encyclopedia, wrote that "When she Loved Me" is a "heart-tugging torch song" about losing a friend as opposed to losing a romantic interest. However, Hischak said that the "simple but moving" song can also be interpreted as a love song out of context. On the Track: A Guide to Contemporary Film Scoring author Fred Karlin agreed that the ballad "works in the most general way to express emotions anyone can relate to", despite originally being a personal statement by one of the film's main characters. J.W. Pepper & Son described the ballad as a "tender love song". Film critic Peter Bradshaw, writing for The Irish Times, wrote that he only "realised that the song is a parable for the parents' fear of abandonment by their children who won't want to play with them when they grow up" after becoming a father himself.

== Reception and accolades ==
"When She Loved Me" has garnered widespread acclaim from music and film critics. Animation film critic Michael Mallory said "only the stoniest of viewers will remain unaffected" by the song, and found "there are Oscar winners out there who would be hard-challenged to match the performance in that scene". Film critic Peter Bradshaw reviewed the ballad as "a tear-jerker" that emotionally rivals the imprisonment of Dumbo's mom in Disney's animated film Dumbo (1941). Mark Caro, writing for the Chicago Tribune, warned audiences who hear "When She Loved Me" for the first time that they "may embarrass themselves fighting back tears". Several other film critics praised the quality of the song in their respective reviews. A writer for the Nashville Scene dubbed the scene the "most affecting" in the Toy Story franchise. P. Nelson Reinsch of PopMatters said the scene "starts out saccharine but becomes truly beautiful in its kitschy truth regarding the inexorable passage of childhood".

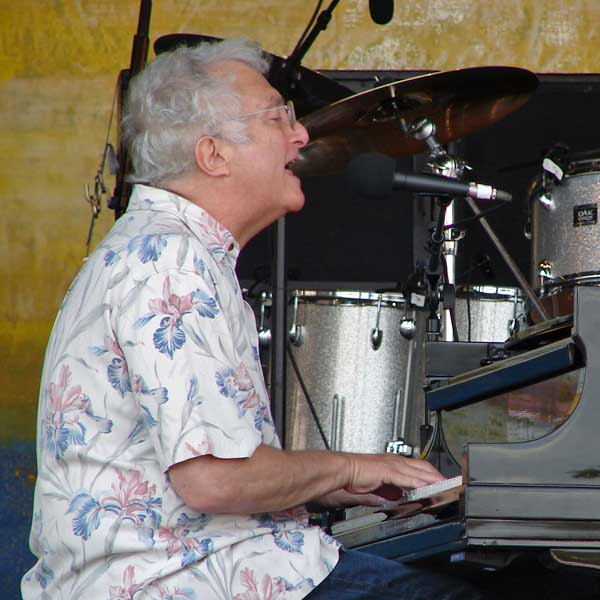
Randy Newman earned his 13th Academy Award nomination for writing "When She Loved Me".

Newman's songwriting and McLachlan's performance were both praised. While Steve Persall of the St. Petersburg Times crowned it "one of Randy Newman's finest love songs", ASCAP considers "When She Loved Me" to be among his most "outstanding" film contributions. In a retrospective analysis of Newman's music, Paste's Tim Grierson believes that, despite sounding "mawkish" at times, the elements of "piercing emotion" the musician incorporates into his film scores prevents "When She Loved Me" from "drift[ing] into pure sap". Jim Lane of News Review called McLachlan's voice "sublime", in addition to naming the track "the most heartbreaking song ever composed for a motion picture". Reviewing the film's special edition re-release in 2006, IGN's Todd Gilchrist said he struggles to identify "other moments in movie history that evoke the same kind of involuntary but completely deserved tears as" "When She Loved Me", describing it as a "bittersweet combination of ebullient love and palpable loneliness". The critic also appreciated Disney's decision to have McLachlan record it over Newman.

In November 1999, The Courier-Journal contributor Judith Egerton predicted that the song would be nominated for an Academy Award. In 2000, "When She Loved Me" was nominated for an Academy Award for Best Original Song at the 72nd Academy Awards, becoming Newman's 13th nomination in the category, and his second Academy Award-nominated song from the Toy Story franchise. The song's nomination was considered unusual at the time because Toy Story 2 is not a musical, unlike most animated films that had received Best Original Song nominations before it. Most critics were expecting Newman to finally win his first Academy Award for "When She Loved Me". LGBT magazine The Advocate joked that the song was "the first Oscar-nominated girl-girl love song", referring to Jessie and Emily's platonic relationship. Ultimately, the song lost to Phil Collins' "You'll Be in My Heart" from Disney's animated film Tarzan (1999). "When She Loved Me" had been nominated for a Golden Globe Award for Best Original Song, which it also lost to "You'll Be in My Heart". "When She Loved Me" went on to win the Grammy Award for Best Song Written for a Motion Picture, Television or Other Visual Media at the 43rd Grammy Awards in 2001. The song also won the Golden Satellite Award for Best Original Song at the 4th Golden Satellite Awards in 2000. GamesRadar+ ranked "When She Loved Me" the sixth greatest Pixar moment.

Tim Grierson of Mel Magazine called "When She Loved Me" "an all-time great tearjerker". The Guardian's Dorian Lynskey believes the song has "made more people cry than any other song [Newman has] written". Similarly, Sam Adams, a critic for The A. V. Club, joked that "There are two kinds of people: People who weep during the 'When She Loved Me' montage, and people who lie about it". Singer-songwriter Elvis Costello identified "When She Loved Me" as a song that continues to make him cry whenever he hears it. The Guardian's Elle Hunt ranked "When She Loved Me" Newman's 16th best song.

== Live performances and cover versions ==
McLachlan and Newman performed "When She Loved Me" live at the 72nd Academy Awards in March 2000, where it had been nominated for the Academy Award for Best Original Song. The song has since been covered by several artists, many of whom tend to adjust the song's interpretation into that of a love song during their own renditions. Mexican pop duo Sentidos Opuestos covered the song in Spanish, entitled "Cuando Ella Me Amaba" for the film and was later released on their fifth album Movimiento Perpetuo (2000). Actor and singer Michael Crawford recorded the song for The Disney Album (2001). Newman himself recorded an abridged, instrumental version of "When She Loved Me" on piano for his album The Randy Newman Songbook, Vol. 1 (2003). PopMatters' Chris Ingalls called Newman's decision to include an instrumental version of the ballad on the album "a smart move" that "allows the listener to hear the sad, aching melody unadorned." The Seattle Weekly wrote that Newman's "spare piano treatment carries this midlevel weeper to a state of grace". In 2006, musician Steve Tyrell recorded the song for his cover album The Disney Standards, which Christopher Loudon of JazzTimes described as a "gorgeously reflective" rendition. Actress and singer Kerry Butler covered "When She Loved Me" for her Disney-themed album Faith, Trust and Pixie Dust (2008), one of the more contemporary-sounding selections on the album of Disney songs.

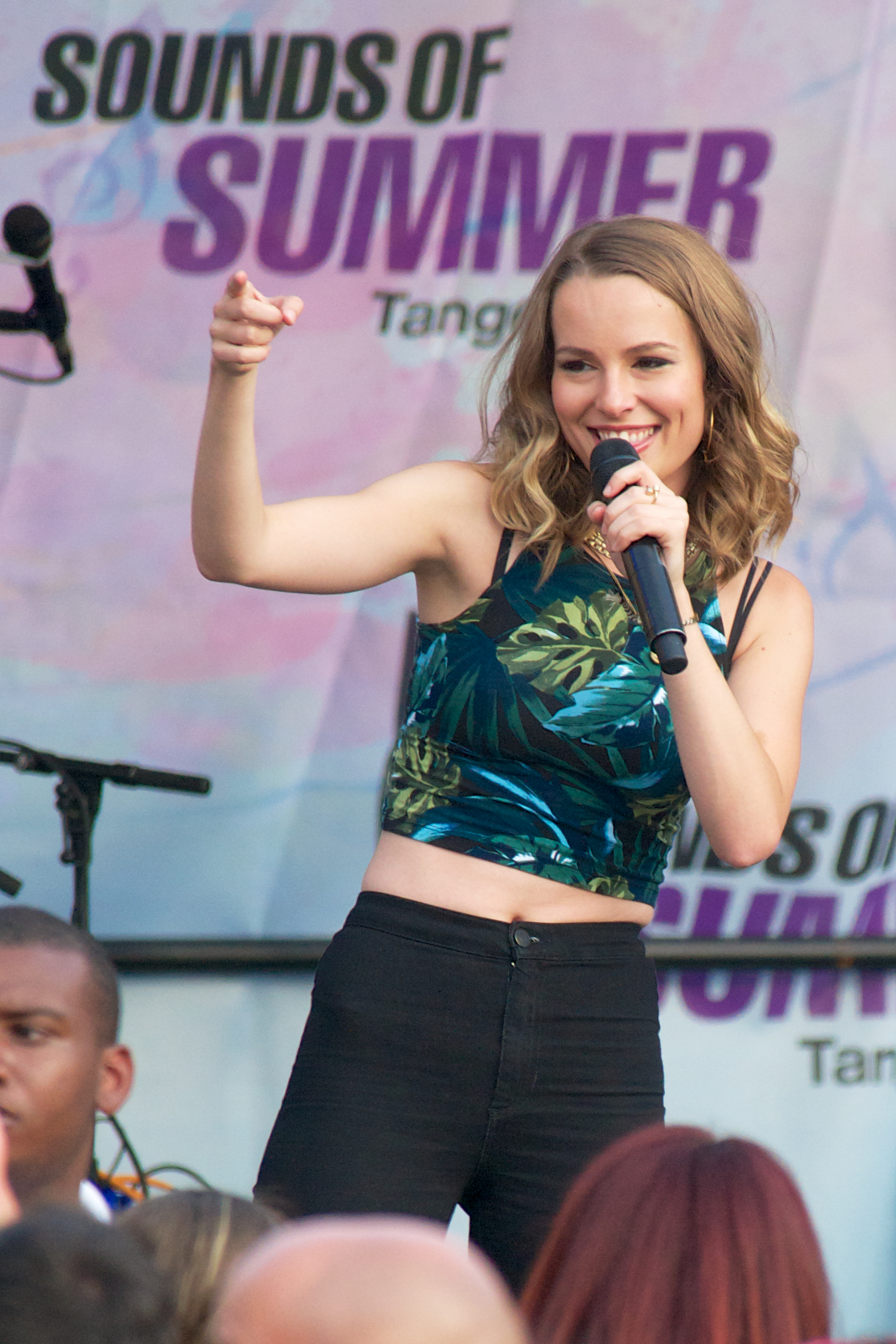
Actress and recording artist Bridgit Mendler covered "When She Loved Me" for Disneymania 7 (2010), to positive reviews.

American singer Jordan Pruitt covered the song for the compilation album Disneymania 5 (2007). Actress and singer Bridgit Mendler covered the song for the compilation album Disneymania 7 (2010), to which Walt Disney Records had personality invited her to contribute. Although Mendler was allowed to choose the song she wanted to record, Disney recommended that she cover "When She Loved Me", which she found very beautiful and agreed to record immediately upon listening to it. Although the artist had heard the song before, she did not remember much about it or its film until re-listening to the track in its entirety. Her first professional recording independent from an acting project, Mendler opted to offer a more upbeat interpretation of the ballad by incorporating guitars into its arrangement while respecting McLachlan's original. To help her replicate the power and emotion of the song and its scene, the producers dimmed the lights during Mendler's recording session. The cover was released shortly before Toy Story 3. Jill Sheets, a writer for the teen magazine Relate Magazine, praised Mendler's vocal performance and called her rendition "stunning". British pop group Steps recorded a cover of "When She Loved Me" for their Christmas album Light Up the World (2012). While Jeremy Williams-Chalmers of The Yorkshire Times praised the "unquestionable dexterity" of the three female singers' vocals, he found that the track "hardly fits with either the group's signature sound or the album's implicit Christmas joviality." Singer Jane Monheit recorded "When She Loved Me" for her album The Heart of the Matter (2013).

Stage actress and singer Samantha Barks covered the ballad on her self-titled debut studio album in 2016, renaming it "When He Loved Me". She promoted it with live performances at Feinstein's/54 Below in support of the album, with Suzanna Bowling of the Times Square Chronicles writing that her "emotions poured forth" with her rendition. Mexican pop group Belanova released a cover of the Spanish version in 2016, for the compilation album We Love Disney (Latino). Describing their rendition as "more heartbreaking" than the original, AXS contributor Lucas Villa observed that the group's "signature electro-pop sound" has been replaced with more acoustic instruments to emphasize front woman Denisse Guerrero's voice, which Villa felt "beautifully reflects the pain and pining in Jessie's sad story", concluding, "The emotion translates well with Belanova's haunting rendition." The song was covered by Japanese-Canadian band Monkey Majik in 2017 for the Japanese Disney cover compilation, "Thank You Disney". In 2019, contestant Walker Burroughs performed "When She Loved Me" live on a Disney-themed episode of the reality television competition American Idol, accompanying himself on piano. The performance was well received by all three judges, with Katy Perry saying "You really transported me into a different time and place" and Lionel Richie calling it "as close to a perfect performance that I can ever think of." Billboard's Robbie Daw dubbed it "the first perfect performance of the night." Burroughs ultimately advanced to the top eight of the competition following his performance.

The King's Singers covered the song using an arrangement by Philip Lawson. It was released in 2019 and featured on their album Love Songs. On their 2020 album The Corner of Broadway and Main Street, Volume 2, a cappella ensemble Voctave performs an arrangement with singer Liz Callaway as a guest soloist.

== Impact and legacy ==
The song has become a fan-favorite, according to Jacob Uitti of American Songwriter. NewNowNext ranked "When She Loved Me" the second greatest song of McLachlan's career, crediting its Academy Award nomination to her "heartfelt interpretation". The song's sad tone has frequently drawn comparisons to McLachlan's television commercials for the American Society for the Prevention of Cruelty to Animals (ASPCA). Ranking "When She Loved Me" first on their "Definitive Ranking of the Saddest Pixar Moments", CollegeHumor's Willie Muse joked that McLachlan used "When She Loved Me" to make listeners cry "long before she was singing background vocals for images of dogs being abused". Uproxx identified "When She Loved Me" as one of Pixar's "Moments ... Guaranteed To Make You Weep", about which author Josh Kurp wrote embodies "the thought and mindfulness ... put into Toy Story 2", calling it "almost as sad as Sarah McLachlan's ASPCA commercial." Ranking the montage the 7th of "17 Disney Moments That Never Fail to Make You Sob", Jenna Mullins of E! News also likened the scene to the singer's ASPCA commercials. Similarly, John Boone of Entertainment Tonight, while ranking "When She Loved Me" Pixar's fourth most tear-jerking moment, joked, "Between this and those adoption commercials, WHAT is your problem, Sarah McLachlan?! Do you WANT us to cry?" Consequence of Sound's Allison Shoemaker believes the ballad is among Pixar's "most potent" scenes "that punches you in the gut", calling it one of Newman's "biggest heartbreakers" before jokingly concluding, "Sarah McLachlan's vocal performance does all the things you remember from those awful animal abuse commercials."

"When She Loved Me" is considered to be one of the most tearful moments in Disney and Pixar's films. HelloGiggles contributor Stephanie Ashe included "When She Loved Me" among "The most emotional moments" from the Toy Story franchise. Digital Spy ranked the song the 10th most heartbreaking Pixar moment. In a retrospective review for The Irish Times, Bradshaw dubbed the song "the single most devastatingly sad moment in any kids' film". Including it among 10 "film soundtrack moments that'll have you crying in your popcorn", BBC Online called the ballad "the most heartbreaking story in the world" while writing that McLachlan's performance "left a generation of children looking to their parents and asking: 'Mummy, why are you sad?'" In 2015, Paste ranked "When She Loved Me" the 27th "Saddest Songs of All Time", with contributor Bonnie Stiernberg writing, "Everyone always talks about how Toy Story 3 destroyed them emotionally ... but the Toy Story scene that consistently breaks me up is the one from Toy Story 2 when Sarah McLachlan sings this Randy Newman song about a toy getting abandoned by her owner as she grows up." HuffPost credits the song with establishing "the foundation for the emotionally tough territory that Pixar would continue to mine in its subsequent efforts." Sky TV wrote that "When She Loved Me" "tugs heart-strings on a level not reached again until" Pixar's Up (2009). In a review of Toy Story 3 (2010), Matt Goldberg of Collider felt that the sequel was slightly inferior to Toy Story 2 due to lacking "a moment of melancholy" like "When She Loved Me".

== Awards and nominations ==
| Award | Category | Result |
|---|---|---|
| Academy Awards | Best Original Song | Nominated |
| Golden Globe Awards | Best Original Song | Nominated |
| Grammy Awards | Best Song Written for a Motion Picture, Television or Other Visual Media | Won |
| Satellite Awards | Best Original Song | Won |
