= Disneyremixmania =

Remix album by Various artists
- Released: September 27, 2005
- Genre: Pop; dance-pop; electropop
- Length: 48:22
- Label: Walt Disney
- Producer: Jay Landers; Dani Markman; Marco Marinangeli

Disneymania album chronology
| Disneymania 3 (2005) | Disneyremixmania (2005) | Disneymania 4 (2006) |

Disneyremixmania is the first remix album in the Disneymania series. It comprises fourteen songs from the past three volumes remixed to create dance versions of Disney songs. Additionally, the "Disneyremixmania Mega Mix" contains three Disneymania 3 songs mashed into a medley by DJ Skribble. The album peaked at #146 on the Billboard 200, making it the lowest charting album in the series until Princess Disneymania which peaked at #191 on the Billboard 200. Also, it was the first album in the series to not be certified Gold. It has sold about 50,000 copies in the US which is the second lowest for a Disneymania album, ahead of only Princess Disneymania, which has sold only 9,000 copies in the US.

== Track listing ==
| # | Title | Performer(s) | Original source | Length |
|---|---|---|---|---|
| 1 | "The 2nd Star to the Right" (Lost Boys Remix) | Jesse McCartney | Peter Pan | 2:49 |
| 2 | "I Won't Say (I'm in Love)" (Grrl Power Remix) | The Cheetah Girls | Hercules | 2:55 |
| 3 | "Under the Sea" (Reggae Remix) | Raven-Symoné | The Little Mermaid | 2:58 |
| 4 | "Hawaiian Roller Coaster Ride" (Mahalo Remix) | Jump5 | Lilo and Stitch | 3:15 |
| 5 | "It's a Small World" (Shorty Remix) | Baha Men | It's a Small World | 2:58 |
| 6 | "I Wan'na Be Like You" (Monkey C Remix) | Smash Mouth | The Jungle Book | 3:23 |
| 7 | "The Siamese Cat Song" (Cat-Scratch Remix) | Hilary Duff & Haylie Duff | Lady and the Tramp | 2:59 |
| 8 | "Colors of the Wind" (Soul Sister Remix) | Ashanti & Lil' sis Shi Shi | Pocahontas | 3:52 |
| 9 | "Circle of Life" (All Star Remix) | Disney Channel Circle of Stars | The Lion King | 3:58 |
| 10 | "The Bare Necessities" (Jungle Boogie Remix) | Bowling for Soup | The Jungle Book | 3:20 |
| 11 | "Part of Your World" (C-Girl Rock Remix) | Skye Sweetnam | The Little Mermaid | 2:54 |
| 12 | "True to Your Heart" (China Doll Remix) | Raven-Symoné | Mulan | 3:41 |
| 13 | "Strangers Like Me" (Jungle Rock Remix) | Everlife | Tarzan | 3:38 |
| 14 | "Cruella De Vil" (DJ Skribble Spot Remix) | Lalaine | 101 Dalmatians | 2:28 |
| 15 | "DJ Skribble Megamix (Under the Sea/I Won't Say (I'm in Love)/Cruella De Vil)" | Raven-Symoné, The Cheetah Girls & Lalaine | The Little Mermaid / Hercules / 101 Dalmatians | 3:07 |

== Chart positions ==
=== Weekly charts ===
| Chart (2005) | Peak position |
|---|---|
| US Billboard 200 | 146 |
| US Top Dance Albums (Billboard) | 2 |
| US Heatseekers Albums (Billboard) | 3 |

=== Year-end charts ===
| Chart (2005) | Position |
|---|---|
| US Top Dance/Electronic Albums (Billboard) | 18 |
| Chart (2006) | Position |
| US Top Dance/Electronic Albums (Billboard) | 8 |

== Singles ==
1. "Under the Sea (Reggae Mix)" Raven-Symoné

== Videos ==
1. "DJ Skribble Megamix"- Raven-Symoné, The Cheetah Girls, Lalaine
2. "Under the Sea" - Raven-Symoné
