= Ashley Gearing =

American singer-songwriter

- Born: May 15, 1991 (age 34)
- Origin: Springfield, Massachusetts, U.S.
- Genres: Country
- Occupation: Singer
- Instrument: Vocals
- Years active: 2003-present
- Labels: Lyric Street; Curb
- Website: https://ashley-gearing.com/

Ashley Gearing is an American country music artist. She has charted four singles on the Billboard Hot Country Songs charts.

== Biography ==
Ashley Gearing was born in Springfield, Massachusetts.

Ashley Gearing made her chart debut in 2003 with the song "Can You Hear Me When I Talk to You?", which peaked at No. 36 on the U.S. Billboard Hot Country Singles & Tracks charts. At the time of its release, the song made Gearing the youngest female artist to enter that chart, at twelve years and one month. This beat a record set by Brenda Lee in 1957. The song was issued as a single on Lyric Street Records. The song is about a child who loses her father at an early age.

At the age of twelve, Gearing sang "When You Wish Upon a Star" on Disneymania 2 and "If You Can Dream" which was certified gold by the RIAA on Disney Princess: The Ultimate Song Collection.

Her first full-length album, Maybe It's Time, was released on the independent label in 2006. This album included the single "I Found It in You". In 2007, she signed with major label Curb Records, charting again with the single "Out the Window" in mid-2008. A second Curb single, "What You Think About Us," was given a release of July 2010.

== Discography ==
=== Studio albums ===
Title	Album details
Maybe It's Time	Release date: 2006; Label: Indie/Squeeze Records

=== EPs ===
Title	Album details
Ashley Gearing	Release date: 2015; Label: Curb

=== Singles ===
Year	Single	Peak positions	Album
Year	Single	US Country	Album
2003	"Can You Hear Me When I Talk to You?"	36	—N/a
2003	"Ribbons of Love"	—	—N/a
2005	"I Found It in You"	—	Maybe It's Time
2008	"Out the Window"	55	—N/a
2010	"What You Think About Us"	58	—N/a
2011	"Five More Minutes"	57	—N/a
2011	"Me, My Heart and I"	—	—N/a
2014	"Boomerang"	—	—N/a
2015	"Train Track"	—	Ashley Gearing — EP
2016	"Love Can Go to Hell"	—	Ashley Gearing — EP
"—" denotes releases that did not chart

=== Guest singles ===
Year	Single	Artist
2013	"I Wanna Wake Up with You"	Tyler Dean

=== Music videos ===
Year	Video	Director
2003	"Can You Hear Me When I Talk to You?"	
2003	"Ribbons of Love"	
2010	"What You Think About Us"	Eric Welch
