= Someday My Prince Will Come =

1937 song by Adriana Caselotti

Song by Adriana Caselotti

from the album Snow White and the Seven Dwarfs
- Recorded: 1937
- Genre: Soundtrack
- Length: 1:53
- Label: Walt Disney
- Composer: Frank Churchill
- Lyricist: Larry Morey

"Someday My Prince Will Come" is a song from Walt Disney's 1937 animated movie Snow White and the Seven Dwarfs. It was written by Larry Morey (lyrics) & Frank Churchill (music), and performed by Adriana Caselotti (Snow White's voice in the movie). It was also featured in the 1979 stage adaptation of the 1937 animated musical movie. In AFI's 100 Years...100 Songs, it was ranked the 19th greatest film song of all time. The song is heard instrumentally in Jeff Morrow's underscore for the 2025 live-action remake of the original film due to the changes made to the plot.

== Production ==
=== Conception ===
Adriana Caselotti was cast in the 1937 film Snow White and the Seven Dwarfs after interrupting a phone conversation her father – a voice coach – was having on the phone with a talent scout. The scout was casting the upcoming film and noted that a previous candidate had sounded like a 30-year-old, so was let go; Caselotti picked up the extension and recommended herself. Only 18 at the time, Disney thought she sounded like a 14-year-old, which is what he wanted, and he offered her the part. She worked on the film for a nominal fee for three years while the film was in production.

=== Composition ===
Meanwhile, Frank Churchill was chosen as the film's composer, who was instructed by Walt Disney to write something "quaint" in order to "appeal more than the hot stuff". The song sees Caselotti perform with "piercing top notes" and "mushy vibrato". The chord structure that underpins the melody has an atypical quality, that led it to become popular within jazz circles. The song is typically played in the key of B-flat major.

=== Context ===
This song first appears 57:40 into the movie, when Princess Snow White sings a bedtime song about how the prince she met at the castle will someday return for her. Later in the film, Snow White sings a reprise while making a pie and a more formal version with a chorus is heard when the prince and Snow White leave for his castle at the film's end.

== Release ==
=== Aftermath ===
After the film's release, the song became popular outside the context of the narrative as a jazz standard. One of the first performances was within the Theresienstadt ghetto in 1943, played by a band known as the Ghetto Swingers. After World War II, it was performed by Lois Butler as the theme song in Mickey, a teen-girl film released in 1948. It was performed by jazz musicians such as Dave Brubeck, who included it on his 1957 album Dave Digs Disney. Another popular recording came from Miles Davis in 1961, who named his album after the song.

=== Critical reception ===
The Financial Times wrote that the song "spelt out the tantalising promise of love and nurture".

=== Legacy ===
The American Film Institute listed this song at No. 19 on their list of the 100 greatest songs in movie history. Following "When You Wish Upon a Star" from Pinocchio at No. 7, this is the second-highest ranked song from a Disney movie out of five, with the other three being "Supercalifragilisticexpialidocious" from Mary Poppins at No. 36, "Beauty and the Beast" from Beauty and the Beast at No. 62 and "Hakuna Matata" from The Lion King at No. 99. The song was then briefly sung on the 1971 sitcom All in the Family by Edith Bunker in the episode "Archie's Weighty Problem". In June 2026, CBS News included the song in its list of the 250 essential American songs of the past 250 years.

== Selected covers ==
=== Jazz covers ===
- Dave Brubeck – Dave Digs Disney (1957)
- Bill Evans – Portrait in Jazz (1960)
- Miles Davis – Someday My Prince Will Come (1961)
- Grant Green – Born to Be Blue (1985)
- Joey DeFrancesco – Reboppin' (1992)
- Wynton Kelly – Someday My Prince Will Come (1961)
- The Three Sounds – Anita O'Day & the Three Sounds (1962)
- Oscar Peterson and Milt Jackson – Reunion Blues (1971)
- Herbie Hancock – The Piano (1978)
- Chick Corea – Akoustic Band (1989)
- Enrico Pieranunzi – Live in Paris (2001)
- Keith Jarrett – Up for It (2002)
- Stanley Clarke – Jazz in the Garden (2009)
- Melody Gardot – Bye Bye Blackbird EP (2009)
- James Morrison – Snappy Too (2012)

=== Pop covers ===
- Patricia Paay – Patricia Zingt (1966)
- Mireille Mathieu and Peter Alexander – Peter Alexander präsentiert Walt Disney's Welt (1976, in German)
- Sinéad O'Connor and Andy Rourke – Stay Awake (Various Interpretations of Music from Vintage Disney Films) (1988)
- Barbra Streisand – Snow White and the Seven Dwarfs: Platinum Edition DVD/VHS (2001)
- Ayumi Hamasaki – (2002) Never for sale, the song was used by Disney in a promotional video for the re-release of Snow White and the Seven Dwarfs in Japan.
- Anastacia – Disneymania (2002) and Freak of Nature (Deluxe) (2002)
- Ashley Tisdale and Drew Seeley – Disneymania 4 (2006)
- The Cheetah Girls – Disneymania 6 (2008)
- Tiffany Thornton – Snow White and the Seven Dwarfs: Diamond Edition DVD/Blu-ray (2009)

== See also ==
- List of 1930s jazz standards
