= Once Upon a Dream (Sleeping Beauty song) =

Song by Mary Costa and Bill Shirley

Song by Mary Costa and Bill Shirley

from the album Sleeping Beauty
- Published: Walt Disney Music Company
- Released: January 29, 1959
- Recorded: 1958
- Genre: Soundtrack
- Label: Walt Disney
- Songwriters: Pyotr Ilyich Tchaikovsky; Jack Lawrence; Sammy Fain
- Producer: George Bruns

Scene
- "An Unusual Prince/Once Upon a Dream (From 'Sleeping Beauty')" from DisneyMusicVEVO on YouTube

"Once Upon a Dream" is a song written for the 1959 animated musical fantasy film Sleeping Beauty produced by Walt Disney. Its lyrics were written by Jack Lawrence and Sammy Fain while the music is adapted by George Bruns. The song's melody is based on the "Grande valse villageoise" (nicknamed "The Garland Waltz"), from the 1890 ballet The Sleeping Beauty by Pyotr Ilyich Tchaikovsky.

"Once Upon a Dream" serves as the film's main theme, and as the love theme of Princess Aurora and Prince Phillip. It is performed in the film by a chorus as an overture and third-reprise finale, as well by Mary Costa and Bill Shirley, who voiced the roles of Aurora and Phillip, respectively.

== Certifications ==
Region	Certification	Certified units/sales
United States (RIAA)	Gold	500,000^{‡}
^{‡} Sales+streaming figures based on certification alone.

== Notable covers ==
American girl group No Secrets recorded the song "Once Upon (Another) Dream", whose chorus is based on "Once Upon a Dream", in 2003 for the two-disc DVD release of Sleeping Beauty. The song was then included in the 2004 compilation album Disneymania 2.

"Once Upon a Dream" was covered by Emily Osment in October 2008 for the Platinum Edition release of the film. Osment's rendition was included in the 2008 compilation album Princess Disneymania.

Seth MacFarlane covered the song for his 2020 show tunes album Great Songs from Stage & Screen.

=== Lana Del Rey version ===
"Once Upon a Dream"

Single by Lana Del Rey

from the album Maleficent
- Released: January 26, 2014
- Recorded: 2013
- Genre: Orchestral pop
- Length: 3:23
- Label: Walt Disney
- Songwriters: Jack Lawrence; Sammy Fain
- Producer: Dan Heath

Lana Del Rey singles chronology
"Young and Beautiful" (2013)	"Once Upon a Dream" (2014)	"West Coast" (2014)

Licensed audio
- "Once Upon a Dream" on YouTube

"Once Upon a Dream" was covered by American singer and songwriter Lana Del Rey for the dark fantasy film Maleficent (2014), which serves as a re-imagining of the original 1959 film. The song was released on January 26, 2014; it was made available as a free digital download during its first week of availability by the Google Play Store. On February 4, the digital download was made available for purchase.

==== Critical reception ====
The cover received generally positive reception. Forbes called the cover "moody and low-key" while Stereogum described it as "swoony" and "spaced-out". Hypable said the cover was "much darker" than the original and pointed out the "slight radio effect" over Del Rey's and called her performance of the song "haunting": Spin said of the song snippet from the trailer: "Smoky vocals, a bewitching come-hither delivery, and delicate piano turn the 1959 fairytale song into a haunting lullaby." Complex remarked that Del Rey's cover had a "somber and sinister" feel in comparison to the original.

==== Charts ====
Chart (2014)	Peak position
Australia (ARIA)	96
France (SNEP)	122
Ireland (IRMA)	71
UK Singles (OCC)	60
US Bubbling Under Hot 100 (Billboard)	5

==== Certifications ====
Region	Certification	Certified units/sales
Australia (ARIA)	Gold	35,000^{‡}
United Kingdom (BPI)	Silver	200,000^{‡}
United States (RIAA)	Platinum	1,000,000^{‡}
^{‡} Sales+streaming figures based on certification alone.
