= Drew Seeley =

Canadian actor and singer (born 1982)

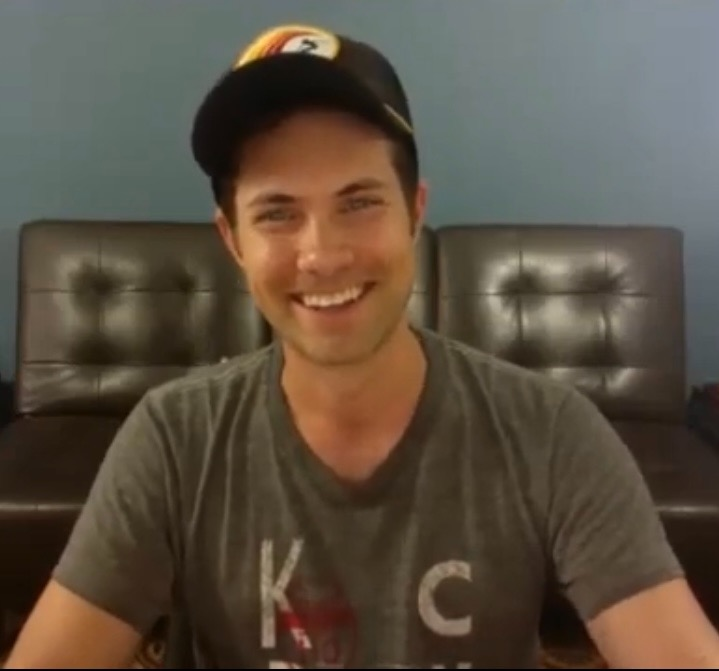
- Seeley in November 2020
- Born: Andrew Michael Edgar Seeley; April 30, 1982 (age 44); Ottawa, Ontario, Canada
- Occupations: Actor; singer; dancer
- Years active: 1999–present
- Spouse: Amy Paffrath (m. 2013)
- Children: 1
- Musical career
- Genres: Dance-pop; R&B
- Labels: TweenPower Entertainment; Drewzilla

Andrew Michael Edgar Seeley (born April 30, 1982) is a Canadian actor, singer and dancer. He has recorded many songs for the Walt Disney Company. He danced as a child in Ontario until he was a preteen and then moved to Florida.

== Early and personal life ==
Andrew Michael Edgar Seeley grew up in Toronto and fell in love with performing. He was once part of a boy band called Nu Ground. He was cast in Hal Prince's revival of Show Boat and stayed with the production for a year. In 2005, Seeley started working with Ray Cham, an established producer, and together they wrote "Get'cha Head in the Game", a song that was a nominee in the Creative Arts Primetime Emmy for Best Original Music and Lyrics.

Seeley is married to actress/comedian Amy Paffrath. The couple has one child, a daughter, who was born in 2019. That same year, Seeley received U.S. citizenship.

== Career ==
=== 2004–2010: Breakthrough films and debut album ===
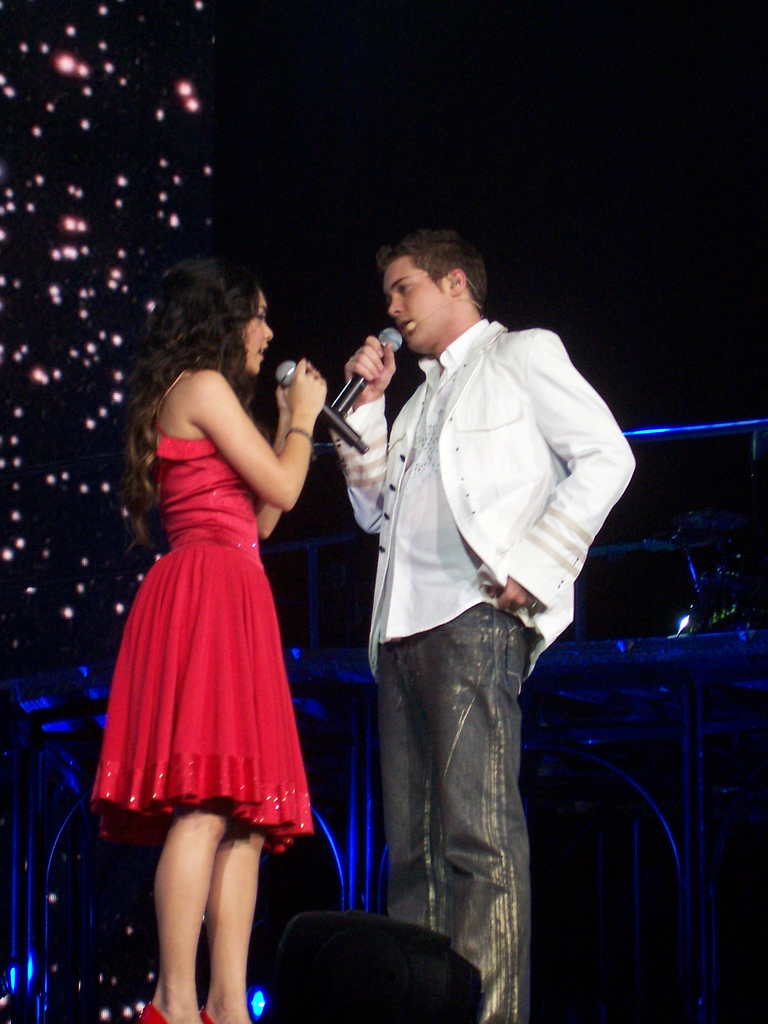
Seeley performing with Vanessa Hudgens

In 2004, Seeley acted as the singing part of Jordan Cahill in the Disney Channel Original Movie Stuck in the Suburbs. He auditioned for the role of Jordan Cahill, but lost the part to Taran Killam. He appeared in the movie as a hotel employee.

In 2005, Seeley began working with producer Ray Cham and together they wrote "Get'cha Head in the Game" for Disney's quadruple platinum High School Musical soundtrack. This garnered them an Emmy nomination for Best Original Music and Lyrics. Seeley was partially the singing voice for Troy Bolton in the first High School Musical film; he was the sole vocalist for some tracks while others were blended with Zac Efron's voice in post-production. In addition, Seeley replaced Efron (who had a scheduling conflict with the shooting of the 2007 film adaptation of the Broadway musical Hairspray) on the North America and Latin America tours of High School Musical: The Concert.

Seeley's working relationship with Disney continued and he can be heard as a featured artist on several Disney soundtracks/compilation albums including Disneymania 5, Disneymania 6, Disney Channel Holiday, Radio Disney Jams, Vol. 9, and Byou. Seeley's duet with Spanish-born Mexican singer Belinda "Dance with Me", from the platinum Cheetah Girls 2 soundtrack was highly promoted by Disney. Seeley also appeared in Belinda's music video for "Ni Freud ni tu mamá". He also made a guest appearance on the 2008 Chipmunks CD Undeniable, singing an updated take on "Shake Your Groove Thing" with Alvin and the gang. Seeley appeared in the Hallmark Channel Movie Claire opposite Valerie Bertinelli, and in the film Fly Kidz, for which he co-wrote and produced the soundtrack. He also wrote and performed music for the Disney Channel Original Movie Jump In! starring Corbin Bleu and Keke Palmer.

Seeley starred opposite Selena Gomez and Jane Lynch in Another Cinderella Story, playing the pop star Joey Parker. He wrote and performed four songs in the film, and shot music videos for both versions of his hit song, "New Classic".

In the summer of 2009 he starred as Prince Eric in the Disney Broadway Musical The Little Mermaid, and had a leading role in the horror movie The Shortcut. In June 2010, Seeley starred in the Hallmark Channel television movie Freshman Father.

=== 2011–present: The Resolution, films, television, and live performances ===
Seeley's album The Resolution was released on April 5, 2011. In support of the album, he went on a national tour where he performed his own original music. He also sang a song for the Disney Channel original series Shake It Up. A duet with Adam Hicks, "Dance for Life," premiered in the episode "Vatalihoosit It Up", backed by a routine performed by dance crew the Jabbawockeez. "Dance for Life" was featured on the soundtrack for the show, Shake It Up: Break It Down. Seeley's song "It's Always Been You" was used as the theme of Crown for Christmas, a 2011 Hallmark Channel movie.

On June 12, 2011, Seeley was reported to have joined the CW's hit teen drama series 90210, but Entertainment Weekly later reported that he dropped the role due to a conflict with his schedule. In March 2012, I Kissed a Vampire was released, in which Seeley stars alongside Lucas Grabeel and Adrian Slade. In June 2012, he co-starred in the Lifetime movie Talhotblond, playing young "Tommy". Seeley has also released music videos for his song "Beautiful" and "Into The Fire". Seeley recorded a song for the third Shake It Up soundtrack Shake It Up: I Love Dance, called "I Do". It featured on Walmart-exclusive editions as a bonus track. The song was also featured in the Shake It Up season 3 episode, "I Do It Up".

In 2013, Seeley began filming his role in Elixir, which was renamed Lovestruck: The Musical on ABC Family. Seeley played the role of "Young Ryan". He played opposite Chelsea Kane (Young Harper), Jane Seymour (Harper), Sara Paxton (Mirabella), Tom Wopat (Ryan), and Alexander DiPersia (Marco). He is featured singing his rendition of Usher's "DJ Got Us Fallin’ in Love". In conjunction with the new movie, Seeley co-wrote and performed "Here & Now," the theme song to ABC Family's spring promotional campaign. The song was featured on Seeley's dance-pop EP released in April 2013. In 2014, Seeley performed as "Bob Gaudio" in Jersey Boys for the US tour.

In 2022, he recorded “Fire” for the doll-based webseries Rainbow High.

Seeley has actively participated in benefit concerts organized by Hold On Til Dawn, a nonprofit initiative supporting the American Foundation for Suicide Prevention (AFSP).

On September 23, 2023, Seeley performed at the second Hold On Til Dawn benefit concert held at Arts at the Armory in Somerville, Massachusetts. The event featured a lineup including Alexz Johnson, Grace Kinstler, Jared Moore, and local artist Johnny, with all proceeds directed to the AFSP.

He returned for the third benefit concert on January 26, 2025, at The Abbey in Orlando, Florida. This concert marked the reunion of pop duo MKTO (Malcolm Kelley and Tony Oller) after over five years, alongside performances by Seeley and Johnny.

On July 10, 2026, Seeley performed during the Bop to the Top tour along with other Disney stars from the era including Alyson Stoner and Adam Hicks.

== Filmography ==
=== Film ===
Year	Title	Role	Notes
1999	Camp Tanglefoot: It All Adds Up	Tommy	
2005	Complete Guide to Guys	Stearns	
2006	Christopher Brennan Saves the World	Tom Hartwell	Short film
2006	The Modern Unicorn's Guide to Love and Magic	Matt	Short film
2008	Another Cinderella Story	Joey Parker	Direct-to-video
2009	The Shortcut	Derek	
2012	The Madame	Partier	Short film
2012	I Kissed a Vampire	Trey Sylvania	
2012	Pitch Perfect	Male Voice No. 5	
2013	Get the Girl Back	Sonny	Short film
2014	LA Bound: 7 Things Nobody Tells You About Moving to LA	Parking Guy 1	Short film
2014	Second Time Around	Sean	Short film
2015	Yellow Day	The Good Man	
2016	Union Bound	Confederate Sharpshooter	
2016	Chalk It Up	Todd	
2016	Do Over	Sean King	
2019	Write Before Christmas	Jax	
2021	Christmas Movie Magic	Brad Westdale	

=== Television ===
Year	Title	Role	Notes
2000	Guiding Light	Andrew	3 episodes; as Andrew Seeley
2002	Dawson's Creek	Male	Episode: "The Importance of Not Being Too Earnest"; as Andrew Seeley
2003–2004	One Tree Hill	Johnny "Vegas" Norris	Episodes: "Crash Into You", "You Gotta Go There to Come Back"; as Andrew Seeley
2004	Stuck in the Suburbs	Front Desk Clerk	Television film; as Andrew Seeley
2005	Locusts	Willy	Television film; as Andrew Seeley
2005	Campus Confidential	Logan	Television film; as Andrew Seeley
2006	High School Musical	singing voice of Troy Bolton	Television film
2007	Claire	Bobby Mills	Television film
2008	The Suite Life of Zack & Cody	David/Jeffery	Episode: "Romancing the Phone"
2010	Freshman Father	John Patton	Television film
2010	The Closer	Boyd Martin	Episode: "Jump the Gun"
2010–2011	Glory Daze	Jason Wilson	Main role
2012	Tallhotblond	Tommy	Television film
2013	Lovestruck: The Musical	Ryan Hutton/Angus	Television film
2013	Non-Stop	Ronnie	Television film
2018	Lethal Admirer	Lloyd	Television film; also known as A Friend's Obsession
2018	He Knows Your Every Move	Jack Newsom	Television film
2018	A Christmas for the Books	Ted Dinrise	Television film
2019	Robot Chicken	Various voices	Episode: "Garfield Stockman in: A Voice Like Wet Ham"
2021	My Boss' Wedding	Michael	Hallmark Movie
2022	The Rookie	Francis Bloomfield	Episode : "Backstabbers"

=== Web ===
Year	Title	Role	Notes
2009	I Kissed a Vampire	Trey Sylvania	Main role
2012	Trend This!	Himself	Episode: "The Dance"
2013	The Flip Side	Andy	2 episodes
2013	Minute Motivations	Andy	Episode: "Holiday Special"
2014	The Interrogationists	Jason Vance	Episode: "The Husband"
2014	His & Hers	Jason	Episode: "All Your Friends Are Men"
2014	CoffeeHouse	Brandon Sherwood	Episode: "Pilot"

== Stage ==
Year	Title	Role	Notes
2009	The Little Mermaid	Prince Eric	Broadway
2011	Celebrity Improv Mashup	Various	Stand-up comedy
2014–2017	Jersey Boys	Bob Gaudio	Broadway & US Tour
2022	Kinky Boots	Ensemble	Hollywood Bowl

== Discography ==
Studio albums

- ~DS~ (2006)
- The Resolution (2011)
- Downtime (2018)
- What's My Name (2026)

== Awards and nominations ==
Year	Award ceremony	Category/Work	Nominee(s)	Result
2006	Creative Arts Primetime Emmys	Outstanding Original Music and Lyrics for "Get'cha Head in the Game" from High School Musical	Ray Cham, Greg Cham and Drew Seeley	Nominated
