= A Dream Is a Wish Your Heart Makes =

Disney song in the movie Cinderella

Single by Ilene Woods

from the album Cinderella (1950 film soundtrack)
- Released: 1950
- Recorded: 1949
- Genre: Soundtrack
- Length: 3:50
- Songwriters: Mack David; Al Hoffman; Jerry Livingston

"A Dream Is a Wish Your Heart Makes" is a song written and composed by Mack David, Al Hoffman and Jerry Livingston for the Walt Disney film Cinderella (1950). In the song, Cinderella (voiced by Ilene Woods) encourages her animal friends never to stop dreaming, and that theme continues throughout the entire story. The song was inspired by Franz Liszt’s Transcendental Etude No. 9 (Ricordanza). This song was also performed by Lily James for the soundtrack of the live-action version of Cinderella in 2015. In April 2020, Demi Lovato and Michael Bublé performed the song for The Disney Family Singalong on ABC. The song was also featured in the 2022 Disney+/Disney Channel original film Sneakerella, sung by Chosen Jacobs and Lexi Underwood.

== "Dreams" as a recurring Disney theme ==
Thematically, the lyrics recall the sentiments expressed in "When You Wish Upon a Star" from Pinocchio (1940). In equating a dream with a wish, the song establishes that Cinderella is using the word "dream" in the metaphorical sense of desires that can, as the lyric promises, "come true." "When You Wish Upon A Star" makes this same promise, as does other Disney material, such as the fireworks show Remember... Dreams Come True and related promotions. The literal meaning of the word, as something that happens "when you're fast asleep", reappears in another Disney song, "Once Upon a Dream" from Sleeping Beauty (1959).

== Release ==
The original version appears on a CD of the original soundtrack, as well as several compilations. Ilene Woods with Harold Mooney and his Orchestra recorded the song in Hollywood on October 26, 1949. It was released by RCA Victor Records as catalog number 31-0014B (in USA) and by EMI on the His Master's Voice label as catalog numbers B 9971, SG 272, HM 2753, JK 2679, SAB 7 and EA 3914.

The song has also been used as part of the opening titles of several iterations of the Walt Disney anthology television series, notably in the medley for The Wonderful World of Disney (1969–1979) and in The Magical World of Disney (1988).

== Certifications ==
Region	Certification	Certified units/sales
United States (RIAA)	Platinum	1,000,000^{‡}
^{‡} Sales+streaming figures based on certification alone.

== Circle of Stars version ==
"A Dream Is a Wish Your Heart Makes"

Single by Disney Channel Circle of Stars

from the album DisneyMania 4
- Released: November 22, 2005
- Recorded: February 12–20, 2005
- Genre: Dance-pop
- Length: 3:45 (single version); 3:39 (radio edit)
- Label: Walt Disney
- Songwriters: Mack David; Al Hoffman; Jerry Livingston

Disney Channel Circle of Stars singles chronology
"Circle of Life" (2003)	"A Dream Is a Wish Your Heart Makes" (2005)	"Do You Want to Build a Snowman?" (2014)

The song was re-recorded by the Disney Channel Circle of Stars, a group of actors and actresses who have appeared in Disney Channel television series and original movies. The line-up was significantly different from that of their re-recording of "Circle Of Life" in 2003. This version was used in commercials for Disney on Ice from 2006 to 2010, and to launch the inflight music aboard international flights via Cebu Pacific airlines in December 2010.

=== Track listing ===
Digital track listing

1. "A Dream Is a Wish Your Heart Makes" (Single Version) – 3:55
2. "A Dream Is a Wish Your Heart Makes" (Christmas Version) – 3:45

=== Official versions ===
- "A Dream Is a Wish Your Heart Makes" (Single Version) – 3:55
- "A Dream Is a Wish Your Heart Makes" (Radio Edit) – 3:39
- "A Dream Is a Wish Your Heart Makes" (Christmas Version) – 3:45
- "A Dream Is a Wish Your Heart Makes" (Cut Live Version) – 1:21
