= Circle of Life =

Song from Disney's 1994 animated film The Lion King

Song by Carmen Twillie and Lebo M

from the album The Lion King: Original Motion Picture Soundtrack
- Released: 31 May 1994
- Length: 3:59
- Label: Walt Disney; Hollywood; Mercury
- Composers: Elton John; Hans Zimmer
- Lyricist: Tim Rice
- Producer: Chris Thomas

Music video
- "Circle of Life" on YouTube

"Circle of Life"
- European variant of the standard artwork

Single by Elton John

from the album The Lion King: Original Motion Picture Soundtrack
- B-side: "I Just Can't Wait to Be King"; "This Land"
- Released: August 1994
- Length: 4:51
- Label: Walt Disney; Hollywood; Mercury
- Composers: Elton John; Hans Zimmer
- Lyricist: Tim Rice
- Producer: Chris Thomas

Elton John singles chronology
"Can You Feel the Love Tonight" (1994)	"Circle of Life" (1994)	"Believe" (1995)

Music video
- "Circle of Life" on YouTube

"Circle of Life" (Note: The Hal Leonard Corporation publishes the song by the fuller title of "Circle of Life (with Nants'Ingonyama)". It appears on The Legacy Collection reissue and the soundtrack of the 2019 remake as "Circle of Life / Nants' Ingonyama".) is a song from Disney's 1994 animated feature film The Lion King. Composed by musician Elton John and composer Hans Zimmer, with lyrics by Tim Rice, the song was performed by Carmen Twillie (the deep female lead vocals) and Lebo M (opening vocals in Zulu) as the film's opening song. In an interview, Rice said he was amazed at the speed with which John composed: "I gave him the lyrics at the beginning of the session at about two in the afternoon. By half-past three, he'd finished writing and recording a stunning demo." John sang a pop version (with alternative lyrics) of the song with the London Community Gospel Choir, which was included in the film's soundtrack and made into a music video.

"Circle of Life" was nominated for the Academy Award for Best Original Song in 1994, along with two other songs from The Lion King: "Hakuna Matata" and "Can You Feel the Love Tonight", the latter of which won the award. "Circle of Life" was also nominated for the Grammy Award for Song of the Year. The song reached No. 11 on the UK Singles Chart and No. 18 and 25 on the US Billboard Hot 100 and Cash Box Top 100. It is featured frequently in attractions based on The Lion King, such as Disney theme parks and parades. Michael Crawford sang it as part of a medley for The Disney Album in 2001.

== Song opening ==
The song is well known for its opening line, sung by South African composer Lebo M in Zulu. While no official transcription of the movie version exists, the Zulu version of the lyrics from the musical/stage production (by Hal Leonard, 1997) is known as follows:

Nants ingonyama bagithi baba.
Sithi uhhmm ingonyama.
Nants ingonyama bagithi baba.
Sithi uhhmm ingonyama.
Ingonyama.
Siyo Nqoba.
Ingonyama nengw' enamabala.

Which translates to English as:

Here comes the lion, father.
Oh yes it's a lion.
Here comes the lion, father.
Oh yes it's a lion.
It's a lion.
We're going to conquer.
A lion and a leopard come to this open place.

The version sung in the film by Lebo M uses the variant 'ngwenyama rather than ingonyama as in the stage production, a term also used as an honorific for "king" (e.g. the King of Eswatini in Swazi).

== Critical reception ==
Upon the release, Larry Flick from Billboard magazine named the song "a second sugar-coated confection from the soundtrack to The Lion King. John flexes his distinctive voice to fine effect over a melodramatic instrumental that suits the grand, larger-than-life quality of the movie. Power ballad's fate as a swift and sizable hit is assured." Troy J. Augusto from Cash Box wrote, "Elton's unique, radio-friendly voice and the song's powerful, dramatic production (courtesy of Chris Thomas) mean broad, immediate success as the film continues its amazing run at the box office." In his weekly UK chart commentary, James Masterton commented, "Sad to relate though it is another rather unimpressive Elton John ballad, unable to stand comparison with much of his classic output and is worryingly close in places to 'The One' – arguably the last single of any value he put out." Alan Jones from Music Week noted, "Elton is in philosophical mood here and has a slightly continental flavour. Publicity for The Lion King movie from which the single is taken should push it into the Top 20." Leesa Daniels from Smash Hits gave "Circle of Life" a score of four out of five, writing, "He has managed to create a beautiful song, that, once you've seen the film, will reduce you to a big blubbering buffoon. The song is grand, majestic and deeply touching..."

== Music video ==
The accompanying music video for "Circle of Life" was directed by US film composer, producer and film director Richard Baskin, but shot half in black-and-white. The clips of the film were shown. The film's voice actors such as James Earl Jones and the choir were added in the video along a real cub and a female art designer. It was made available on YouTube in November 2017, and had generated more than 22 million views as of May 2025.

== Live performances ==
As one of his favorite songs from The Lion King, John began to perform "Circle of Life" in some of his concerts, shows and performances for nearly 20 years including a 2012 performance at The Colosseum at Caesars Palace in Las Vegas, Nevada during his The Million Dollar Piano residency, which was released as a home media in 2014.

== Personnel ==
- Elton John – piano, lead vocals
- Davey Johnstone – guitar
- Chuck Sabo – strings, drums
- Phil Spalding – bass
- Guy Babylon – keyboards

== Theatrical version ==
=== Act I ===
In the theatrical adaptation, the opening sequence is noticeably different from the opening of the film. For example, the song is sung by Rafiki instead of an off-screen female narrator.

With the sun rising over the Pride Lands, Rafiki commences the start of the production by singing the opening chant of the song and summoning the animals of the Pride Lands for the presentation of baby Simba. As the first two verses of the musical number end, a representation of Pride Rock appears on stage carrying its two reigning rulers, Sarabi cradling the small puppet representing her son in her arms with Mufasa alongside her. As the choir chants excitedly in the background, Rafiki accompanies the monarch and his consort to the top of Pride Rock to bless the cub before raising him high in the air, singing joyfully alongside the chorus as the gathered animals bow before their new prince.

=== Act II ===
At the end of Act II, Simba's friends and family acknowledge him as the rightful king after Scar's defeat. Rafiki crowns Simba with the mantle of kingship after his victory and Simba ascends Pride Rock. There he gives a mighty roar which echoes across the whole kingdom, and the animals come back to the Pride Lands to recognise and salute Simba as the rightful king. The musical ends as Rafiki presents Simba and Nala's newborn cub (Fluffy) to all of the animals, followed by a blackout that finishes Act II and leads to the curtain call at the end of the performance.

The assembly of animals that appear are slightly different from the start of the first act. There are no wildebeests nor adult elephants, only two zebras instead of three, nine gazelles instead of twelve, and half of the bird performers instead of four. Only the baby elephant, the rhino, the giraffes, three cranes, the cheetah, and the birds appear as poles on cranes as kites.

== Charts ==
=== Weekly charts ===
Weekly chart performance for Elton John version
Chart (1994–1995)	Peak position
Australia (ARIA)	60
Austria (Ö3 Austria Top 40)	30
Belgium (Ultratop 50 Flanders)	5
Canada Retail Singles (The Record)	7
Canada Top Singles (RPM)	3
Canada Adult Contemporary (RPM)	1
Europe (Eurochart Hot 100)	14
Europe (European AC Radio)	3
Europe (European Hit Radio)	13
Germany (GfK)	10
Iceland (Íslenski Listinn Topp 40)	5
Ireland (IRMA)	9
Israel (Israeli Singles Chart)	24
Netherlands (Dutch Top 40)	5
Netherlands (Single Top 100)	7
Netherland Airplay (Music & Media)	3 (Note: Music & Media's Holland airplay chart was introduced on the issue of 4 February 1995, replacing an airplay that was for all Dutch-language areas, including the Flanders region of Belgium. "Circle of Life" was number three on its first week, after being a chart-topper on the previous chart.)
New Zealand (Recorded Music NZ)	13
Scottish Singles Sales (Official Charts)	7
Sweden (Sverigetopplistan)	3
Switzerland (Schweizer Hitparade)	2
UK Singles (Official Charts)	11
UK Airplay (Music Week)	6
Uruguay (UPI)	3
US Billboard Hot 100	18
US Adult Contemporary (Billboard)	2
US Pop Airplay (Billboard)	26
US Cash Box Top 100	25

=== Year-end charts ===
1994 year-end chart performance for Elton John version
Chart (1994)	Position
Brazil (Mais Tocadas)	64
Canada Top Singles (RPM)	32
Canada Adult Contemporary (RPM)	20
Iceland (Íslenski Listinn Topp 40)	77
Sweden (Topplistan)	42
UK Singles (OCC)	73
US Adult Contemporary (Billboard)	40

1995 year-end chart performance for Elton John version
Chart (1995)	Position
Germany (Media Control)	79
Netherlands (Dutch Top 40)	56
Sweden (Topplistan)	64
Switzerland (Schweizer Hitparade)	48

== Certifications ==
=== Carmen Twillie version ===
Certifications for "Circle of Life", Carmen Twillie version
Region	Certification	Certified units/sales
United Kingdom (BPI)	Platinum	600,000^{‡}
United States (RIAA)	Platinum	1,000,000^{‡}
^{‡} Sales+streaming figures based on certification alone.

=== Elton John version ===
Certifications for "Circle of Life", Elton John version
Region	Certification	Certified units/sales
Germany (BVMI)	Gold	250,000^{^}
New Zealand (RMNZ)	Gold	15,000^{‡}
United Kingdom (BPI)	Gold	400,000^{‡}
United States (RIAA)	Gold	500,000^{‡}
^{^} Shipments figures based on certification alone.^{‡} Sales+streaming figures based on certification alone.

== Release history ==
Release dates and formats for "Circle of Life"
Region	Date	Format(s)	Label(s)	Ref.
United States	August 1994	Commercial	Walt Disney; Hollywood	
United Kingdom	26 September 1994	CD; cassette	Mercury	
Japan	15 October 1994	Mini-CD	Rocket	
Australia	7 November 1994	CD; cassette	Mercury	

== Cover versions and usage in media ==
=== Foreign adaptations ===
"Circle of Life" was adapted into other languages for the international versions of The Lion King. These adaptations include:

- "En verden af liv" in Danish, adapted by Jesper Kjær and performed by Lise Dandanell
- "De kringloop van het leven" in Dutch, adapted by Jan Derk Beck and performed by Barbara Dex
- "L'Histoire de la vie" in French, adapted by Luc Aulivier and Claude Rigal-Ansous and performed by Debbie Davis
- "Der ewige Kreis" in German, adapted by Frank Lenart and performed by Jocelyn B. Smith
- "Il cerchio della vita" in Italian, adapted by Michele Centonze and performed by Ivana Spagna
- "Sākuru obu Raifu" (サークル・オブ・ライフ) in Japanese, performed by Yukari Miyazono
- "Ciclo sem fim" in Portuguese, adapted by Alfredo Marco and Eliana Estevão and performed by Ana Paulino
- "Ciclo sin fin" or "El ciclo de la vida" in Spanish, adapted by Omar Canals, Javier Pontón and Miguel Ángel Poveda and performed by Táta Vega
- "En värld full av liv" in Swedish, adapted by Monica Forsberg and performed by Meta Roos
- "Shēng Shēng Bù Xī" (生生不息) in Mandarin, adapted by 樓恩奇(Lóu Ēn-Qí), performed by 陳世娟(Chén Shì-Juān).

=== Other versions ===
The song was featured in Disney's 2019 photorealistic computer-animated remake of The Lion King and was used in the first trailer of the film, a near shot-for-shot remake of the opening of the original animated film. This new version of the song was performed by Brown Lindiwe Mkhize, the actress who performed as Rafiki in the stage adaptation of the movie in London from 2005 to 2018. However, the new version also retains the original Zulu opening vocals by Lebo M from the 1994 film.

G4 recorded a cover version of the song for their self titled debut album, which they had performed previously during series 1 of the British X Factor.

In 2017, American boyband 98° recorded a cover version of the song to help promote a re-release of The Lion King on Blu-ray as part of the Disney Signature Collection. The single was released as a digital download on 22 September 2017.

The song was remixed by Mat Zo which was released in the album Dconstructed on 22 April 2014.

At the 2011 White House Correspondents' Association Dinner, President Barack Obama jokingly claimed he was going to show his "long-form birth video", spoofing Barack Obama citizenship conspiracy theories that alleged he was born outside of the United States, rather than in his actual birthplace of Honolulu, Hawaii. The opening chant was played from the film showing Simba being lifted to the skies.

In 2015, the song was including in a Lion King songs medley performed by YouTuber and singer Georgia Merry.

New York Mets outfielder Yoenis Cespedes started using the song as his walk-up music during the 2016 Major League Baseball season.
