= The Best of Michael Jackson =

Greatest hits album by Michael Jackson
- Released: August 28, 1975
- Recorded: June 1971 – December 1974
- Length: 36:31
- Label: Motown
- Producer: Berry Gordy; Hal Davis; Mel Larson; Jerry Marcellino; The Corporation; Brian Holland; Sam Brown III; Bob Gaudio

Michael Jackson chronology
Forever, Michael (1975)	The Best of Michael Jackson (1975)	Off the Wall (1979)

Professional ratings
Review scores
Source	Rating
AllMusic	4/5 stars
Christgau's Record Guide	B−

The Best of Michael Jackson is the first greatest hits compilation by American singer Michael Jackson. It was released by Motown on August 28, 1975. The album peaked at number 44 on the Billboard Top Soul Albums chart.

== Track listing ==
No.	Title	Writer(s)	Length
1.	"Got to Be There"	Elliot Willensky	3:26
2.	"Ben"	Walter Scharf; Don Black	2:45
3.	"With a Child's Heart"	Sylvia Moy; Vicky Basemore; Henry Cosby	3:33
4.	"Happy (Love Theme from Lady Sings the Blues)"	Michel Legrand; Smokey Robinson	3:23
5.	"One Day In Your Life"	Sam Brown III; Renee Armand	4:16
6.	"I Wanna Be Where You Are"	Leon Ware; Arthur Ross	3:01
7.	"Rockin' Robin"	Leon René	2:34
8.	"We're Almost There"	Brian Holland; Edward Holland Jr.	3:45
9.	"Morning Glow"	Stephen Schwartz	3:36
10.	"Music and Me"	Jerry Marcellino; Mel Larson; Don Fenceton; Mike Cannon	2:37

Tracks 1, 6, 7 from Got to Be There. Track 2 from Ben. Tracks 3, 4, 9, 10 from Music & Me. Tracks 5, 8 from Forever, Michael.

== Charts ==
=== Weekly charts ===
Chart (1975)	Peak position
Dutch Albums (Album Top 100)	3
UK Albums (OCC)	11
US Billboard 200	156
US Top R&B/Hip-Hop Albums (Billboard)	44
US Cashbox Top Albums	93

=== Year-end charts ===
Chart (1981)	Position
Dutch Albums (Album Top 100)	95
