= The Michael Jackson Mix =

Compilation album by Michael Jackson
- Released: 1987
- Recorded: July 1969 – December 1974: 1984 (overdubbing on "Love Mix 2" tracks 3 & 5; "Dance Mix 1" track 7; "Dance Mix 2" tracks 2 & 3)
- Genre: Pop; R&B; funk; rock
- Label: Stylus Music

Michael Jackson chronology
The Original Soul of Michael Jackson (1987)	The Michael Jackson Mix (1987)	Dangerous (1991)

Professional ratings
Review scores
Source	Rating
AllMusic	3/5 stars

The Michael Jackson Mix is a compilation album by American singer and recording artist Michael Jackson, released in 1987. Available as a double LP, double cassette and double CD, the album contains 40 songs from Jackson's Motown career―solo and with The Jackson 5―edited together in four separate megamixes: "Love Mix 1" and "Love Mix 2" on the first LP, cassette and CD, and "Dance Mix 1" and "Dance Mix 2" on the second LP, cassette and CD.

== Track listing ==
=== "Love Mix 1" ===
(LP & cassette side one; CD one – 23:06)

1. "Ben" (Don Black, Walter Scharf)
2. "Ain't No Sunshine" (Bill Withers)
3. "One Day in Your Life" (Sam Brown III, Renée Armand)
4. "Never Can Say Goodbye" (Clifton Davis)
5. "Got to Be There" (Hal Davis, The Corporation, Willie Hutch)
6. "Happy (Love Theme from 'Lady Sings the Blues')" (Michel Legrand, Smokey Robinson)
7. "I'll Be There" (Berry Gordy, Bob West, Willie Hutch, Hal Davis)
8. "We're Almost There" (Brian Holland, Edward Holland Jr.)
9. "People Make the World Go Round" (Thom Bell, Linda Creed)

=== "Love Mix 2" ===
(LP & cassette side two; CD one – 20:15)

1. "Who's Lovin' You" (Smokey Robinson, Berry Gordy)
2. "I Was Made to Love Her" (Stevie Wonder, Lula Mae Hardaway, Henry Cosby, Sylvia Moy)
3. "You've Really Got a Hold on Me" (Smokey Robinson)
4. "Music and Me" (Jerry Marcellino, Mel Larson, Don Fenceton, Mike Cannon)
5. "Call on Me" (Fonce Mizell, Larry Mizell)
6. "Lonely Teardrops" (Gordy, Roquel "Billy" Davis, Gwendolyn Gordy)
7. "You've Got a Friend" (Carole King)
8. "Girl Don't Take Your Love from Me" (Willie Hutch)
9. "We've Got a Good Thing Going" (The Corporation)
10. "I'll Come Home to You" (Freddie Perren, Christine Yarian)

=== "Dance Mix 1" ===
(LP & cassette side three; CD two – 21:10)

1. "ABC" (The Corporation)
2. "I Want You Back" (The Corporation)
3. "Get It Together" (Hal Davis, Norman Whitfield)
4. "The Boogie Man" (Deke Richards)
5. "Just a Little Bit of You" (Brian Holland, Edward Holland Jr.)
6. "The Love You Save" (The Corporation)
7. "Farewell My Summer Love" (Keni St. Lewis)
8. "Love Is Here and Now You're Gone" (Holland, Lamont Dozier)
9. "Hallelujah Day" (Freddie Perren, Christine Yarian)
10. "Skywriter" (Mel Larson, Jerry Marcellino)
11. "Lookin' Through the Windows" (The Corporation, Davis)

=== "Dance Mix 2" ===
(LP & cassette side four; CD two – 21:02)

1. "Sugar Daddy" (The Corporation)
2. "Don't Let It Get You Down" (Jerry Marcellino, Mel Larson, Deke Richards)
3. "Girl You're So Together" (Keni St. Lewis)
4. "Mama's Pearl" (The Corporation)
5. "My Girl" (Smokey Robinson, Ronald White)
6. "Dancing Machine" (Hal Davis, Don Fletcher, Dean Parks)
7. "Shoo-Be-Doo-Be-Doo-Da-Day" (Stevie Wonder, Sylvia Moy, Henry Cosby)
8. "Doctor My Eyes" (Jackson Browne, Richard Sanford Orshoff)
9. "Rockin' Robin" (Leon René)
10. "Little Bitty Pretty One (Bobby Day)

== UK 7" promo ==
=== "Dance Mix 1" – Promo Edit ===
(Side A – 3:18)

1. "ABC"
2. "I Want You Back"
3. "Get It Together"
4. "The Boogie Man"

=== "Love Mix 1" – Promo Edit ===
(Side B – 3:56)

1. "Ben"
2. "Ain't No Sunshine"
3. "One Day in Your Life"

== Personnel ==
- DMC – compilation
- Dakeyne – DJ mix (megamix)
- Ceri Berry – liner notes

== Charts ==
Chart (1988)	Peak position
European Top 100 Albums (Music & Media)	81
UK Albums Chart	27

== Certifications ==
Region	Certification	Certified units/sales
United Kingdom (BPI)	Platinum	300,000^{^}
^{^} Shipments figures based on certification alone.
