= E.T. the Extra-Terrestrial (album) =

1982 audiobook and soundtrack album

Soundtrack album by John Williams / Michael Jackson
- Released: November 15, 1982
- Recorded: 1982
- Genre: Soundtrack
- Length: 39:31
- Label: MCA
- Producer: Quincy Jones

John Williams chronology
Raiders of the Lost Ark (1981)	E.T. the Extra-Terrestrial (1982)	Return of the Jedi (1983)

Michael Jackson chronology
One Day in Your Life (1981)	E.T. the Extra-Terrestrial (1982)	Thriller (1982)

E.T. the Extra-Terrestrial is an audiobook and soundtrack companion album for the 1982 film directed by Steven Spielberg. Composed by John Williams, the album was narrated by recording artist Michael Jackson, produced by Quincy Jones, and distributed by MCA Records. The audiobook was produced by Williams and Jackson working with Rod Temperton, Freddy DeMann, and Bruce Swedien.

The E.T. the Extra-Terrestrial audiobook was released by MCA on November 15, 1982 – the same month as Jackson's acclaimed sixth studio album Thriller – despite conditions given by Epic Records, Jackson's record label, that it should not be released until after Thriller. As a result, Epic took legal action against MCA which forced the album's withdrawal. During its curtailed release, E.T. the Extra-Terrestrial reached number 37 on the Billboard 200 and number 82 on the UK Albums Chart. It was well-received critically and won Jackson a Grammy Award for Best Recording for Children.

== Background ==
In June 1982, the Steven Spielberg-directed science fiction feature film E.T. the Extra-Terrestrial was released to cinemas. Created by Spielberg's Amblin Entertainment and distributed by Universal Pictures (then a subsidiary of MCA Inc.), it starred Henry Thomas, Dee Wallace, Robert MacNaughton, Drew Barrymore and Peter Coyote. The film tells the story of Elliott, a boy who befriends a good-natured extraterrestrial he calls E.T., who is stranded on Earth. Upon its release, the film became a blockbuster and surpassed Star Wars to become the highest-grossing film released to that point. It was critically acclaimed, and the American Film Institute ranks it as the third greatest science fiction film ever produced in the United States.

Prior to the recording of the E.T. the Extra-Terrestrial album, Jackson released four solo studio albums with Motown Records between 1972 and 1975 (Got to Be There, Ben, Music & Me and Forever, Michael), and several with his brothers as part of The Jackson 5/Jacksons between 1969 and 1981. In 1975, he and his brothers (except Jermaine) moved to Epic Records and in 1979, Michael released his fifth solo album, Off the Wall, to critical and commercial success.

== Production ==
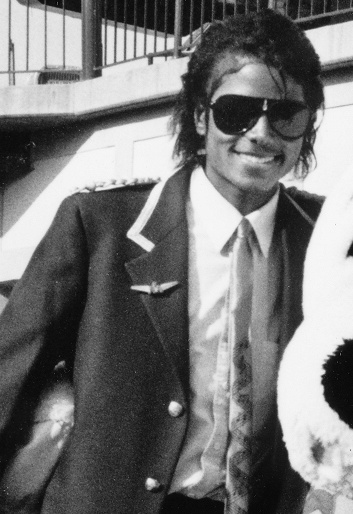
Michael Jackson (pictured in 1984)

Jackson began work on the audiobook E.T. the Extra-Terrestrial in June 1982 – about two months after he began recording his sixth studio album Thriller. Quincy Jones served as the producer for both projects, in addition to working as the narrative writer for the audiobook. During the recording of the narration, Jackson became so upset when E.T. died in the story that he wept. Jones and Spielberg both felt that trying to record the part again would not change the pop star's emotional reaction and decided to leave Jackson's crying in the finished recording. Jackson biographer Lisa D. Campbell wrote that Jones had learned this during the recording of "She's Out of My Life" (from the Off the Wall album), where the singer also broke down in tears. Speaking about the character, Jackson commented the following:

"He's in a strange place and wants to be accepted – which is a situation that I have found myself in many times when travelling from city to city all over the world. He's most comfortable with children, and I have a great love for kids. He gives love and wants love in return, which is me. And he has that super power which lets him lift off and fly whenever he wants to get away from things on Earth, and I can identify with that. He and I are alike in many ways."

Several of the contributors to the E.T. the Extra-Terrestrial storybook album had worked with Jackson in the past. Rod Temperton, who had written several songs featured on Off the Wall and Thriller, wrote the music for "Someone in the Dark". Freddy DeMann and Ron Weisner, former managers of the Jacksons, served as the production coordinators for the album. Bruce Swedien engineered E.T. the Extra-Terrestrial, a task he had performed on Off the Wall and Thriller and would go on to perform for the next albums of Jackson. Dick Zimmerman photographed Jackson for the Thriller album cover, before again capturing the singer for the accompanying poster to the E.T. the Extra-Terrestrial album.

Once the recording and engineering aspects of production had been completed, MCA Records (the distributor of the album) pressed more than a million copies of the audiobook. In 1982 a journalist for Billboard wrote that it was one of the "most ambitious" projects MCA Records had taken on to date.

== Content ==
The E.T. the Extra-Terrestrial album package contains a storybook, which allows listeners to read along with Jackson as he narrates the tale of E.T. and the alien's visit to planet Earth. The book contains a photograph of E.T. placing his hands on Jackson's shoulders, while one of the extraterrestrial's fingers glows. This picture is included in the album package as a 22 inches (56 cm) × 22 inches (56 cm) full-color poster. The 20-page storybook include stills from the movie and the lyrics to the song "Someone in the Dark" (written by Alan and Marilyn Bergman), which Jackson sings on the audiobook. The recording, on a 12-inch vinyl LP, features original music by John Williams, integrated sound effects from the movie, as well as the voice of E.T. in the background.

== Release and legal issues ==
Epic Records allowed Jackson to record the album on two conditions:

1. MCA Records was not to release E.T. the Extra-Terrestrial until after Christmas 1982. (This was to avoid the audiobook's competing with Jackson's new album, Thriller.)
2. The song "Someone in the Dark" was not to be released as a single.

MCA Records breached both conditions, releasing the storybook in November 1982 and giving 7-inch promo copies of "Someone in the Dark" to radio stations. After Epic lodged a $2 million lawsuit, MCA Records was forced to withdraw the album and prohibited from releasing "Someone in the Dark" as a single. Epic executives had felt that MCA was misleading members of the public into believing the then-recently released single "The Girl Is Mine" was featured on the storybook album. The plaintiffs further requested that MCA Records be banned from working with Jackson in the future and that any other media owned by MCA featuring the singer be prohibited from release.

As a result of the legal restrictions that prohibited the public release of "Someone in the Dark" as a single, the promo copies which were made have since become one of the singer's rarest and most sought-after records. By the time the court order was issued against MCA, more than 450,000 copies were already sold in the United States. According to John Branca in the Thriller 40 documentary, Jackson was upset at Walter Yetnikoff, then-president of Epic Records, for making the decision to sue MCA and Universal. Yetnikoff asked what he should do to resolve the situation, and upon Branca's suggestion, granted Jackson the ownership all of his masters starting from Off the Wall. The song's opening version was later included on the 2001 special edition of Thriller, as well as Thriller 25 and the box set Michael Jackson: The Ultimate Collection.

== Reception ==
E.T. the Extra-Terrestrial reached number 82 on the UK Albums Chart, which was considered high for a storybook album. The audiobook won Jackson a Grammy Award in 1984 (Note: In order to be eligible for a Grammy Award at the 1984 ceremony, nominated records had to be released between October 1, 1982, and September 30, 1983.) for Best Recording for Children. Jackson won a record eight Grammys from twelve nominations, the singer said that of all the awards he had received that night, he was "most proud of this one".

E.T. the Extra-Terrestrial was also well-received critically. Charles L. Sanders of Ebony magazine described it as an "extraordinary album". Mark Bego of the Toledo Blade asserted that the song "Someone in the Dark" was "one of the most beautiful ballads" Jackson had ever recorded. He further commented that the amalgamation of Jones's production, dialogue from the film, Jackson's "effective and emotional" reading of the narrative and the audiobook's "grand soaring orchestration" made the E.T. the Extra-Terrestrial album "[elicit] as many tears as the movie does". A writer for Billboard described the audiobook as being "lavishly packaged, lovingly produced" and worth its high asking price. A journalist for the Lexington Herald-Leader concluded that it was a "delightful" storybook album.

== Track listing ==
All tracks are written by John Williams, except where noted.

Side one
No.	Title	Writer(s)	Artist	Length
1.	"Someone in the Dark" (Opening Version) (recorded June 1982)	Alan Bergman; Marilyn Bergman; Rod Temperton	Michael Jackson	4:54
2.	"Landing"			3:24
3.	"Alone"			3:50
4.	"Discovery"			2:13
5.	"School"			2:26
Total length:				16:47

Side two
No.	Title	Writer(s)	Artist	Length
1.	"Home"			2:17
2.	"Intrusion"			3:39
3.	"E.T. Phone Home"			3:01
4.	"Chase"			3:18
5.	"Good-Bye"			4:45
6.	"Someone in the Dark" (Closing Version) (recorded June 1982)	A. Bergman; M. Bergman; Temperton	Michael Jackson	2:54
Total length:				19:54

== Personnel ==
- Michael Jackson – narration, vocals
- Quincy Jones – producer (for Quincy Jones Productions), narrative
- John Williams – original music for E.T. composer, conductor
- William Kotzwinkle – narrative
- Steven Spielberg – narrative, executive producer
- Peggy Lipton – narrative
- Alan Bergman – lyrics to "Someone in the Dark"
- Marilyn Bergman – lyrics to "Someone in the Dark"
- Rod Temperton – music to "Someone in the Dark"
- Jeremy Lubbock – arranger, conductor
- Craig Huxley – synthesizer solo
- Kathy "Leen" Carey – album concept
- Kathleen Kennedy – executive producer
- Kate Barker – assistant to executive producers
- Freddy DeMann – production coordinator
- Ron Weisner – production coordinator
- Bruce Cannon – editor
- Pam Crocetti – production assistant
- Madeline Randolph – production assistant
- Corinne Alicia – production assistant
- Bonnie Sachs – production assistant
- Charles L. Campbell – supervising sound editor
- David A. Pettijohn – sound effects editor
- Louis Edemann – sound effects editor
- Richard C. Franklin Jr. – sound effects editor
- Samuel C. Crutcher – sound effects editor
- Buzz Knudson – re-recording mixer
- Robert Glass – re-recording mixer
- Don Digirolamo – re-recording mixer
- Bruce Swedien – storybook album engineer
- Matt Forger – assistant engineer
- Nancy Cushing-Jones – project coordinator
- Michael Brock – designer
- Bruce McBroom – photographer
- Terry Chostner – photographer
- Dick Zimmerman – photographer for poster
- Drew Struzan – cover illustration
- George Osaki – art direction

== Charts ==
Weekly charts for E.T. the Extra-Terrestrial
Charts (1982–1983)	Peak position
Dutch Albums (Album Top 100)	23
German Albums (Offizielle Top 100)	30
Swedish Albums (Sverigetopplistan)	36
UK Albums (Official Charts Company)	82
US Billboard Top LPs & Tape	37
US Cashbox Top Albums	35
