= 18 Greatest Hits (Michael Jackson and the Jackson 5 album) =

Greatest hits album by Michael Jackson and the Jackson 5
- Released: July 1, 1983
- Recorded: July 1969 – December 1974
- Length: 59:37
- Label: Motown; Telstar

Michael Jackson chronology
Thriller (1982)	18 Greatest Hits (1983)	Farewell My Summer Love (1984)

The Jackson 5/The Jacksons chronology
The Jacksons Live! (1981)	18 Greatest Hits (1983)	Victory (1984)

Singles from 18 Greatest Hits
- 1. "Happy" Released: 1983

18 Greatest Hits is a greatest hits album by American singer Michael Jackson and his former family band the Jackson 5. It spent three weeks at the top of the charts in the United Kingdom after its release on July 1, 1983 by Motown and Telstar Records. Featuring 18 songs released between 1969 and 1975, it became Michael's second number one on the UK Albums Chart, right behind Thriller (1982), as well as the Jackson 5's first and only chart-topper there. The album shares cover artwork with the single for "Happy", which was released in Europe to promote it.

== Track listing ==
Tracks 2, 4, 6, 8, 12, 13, 14, 16, 17 and 18 are performed by the Jackson 5.

1. "One Day in Your Life" (from Forever, Michael)
2. "Lookin' Through the Windows" (from Lookin' Through the Windows)
3. "Got to Be There" (from Got to Be There)
4. "Doctor My Eyes" (from Lookin' Through the Windows)
5. "Ben" (from Ben)
6. "ABC" (from ABC)
7. "We're Almost There" (from Forever, Michael)
8. "Skywriter" (from Skywriter)
9. "Rockin' Robin" (from Got to Be There)
10. "Happy" (from Music & Me)
11. "Ain't No Sunshine" (from Got to Be There)
12. "I'll Be There" (from Third Album)
13. "I Want You Back" (from Diana Ross Presents The Jackson 5)
14. "The Love You Save" (from ABC)
15. "We've Got a Good Thing Going" (from Ben)
16. "Mama's Pearl" (from Third Album)
17. "Never Can Say Goodbye" (from Maybe Tomorrow)
18. "Hallelujah Day" (from Skywriter)

== Charts ==
Chart performance of 18 Greatest Hits
Chart (1983)	Peak position
Austrian Albums (Ö3 Austria)	53
Dutch Albums (Album Top 100)	23
New Zealand Albums (RMNZ)	22
UK Albums (OCC)	1

== Certifications ==
Region	Certification	Certified units/sales
United Kingdom (BPI)	Platinum	300,000^{^}
^{^} Shipments figures based on certification alone.

== See also ==
- List of UK Albums Chart number ones of the 1980s
