= Music & Me (disambiguation) =

Music & Me is a 1973 album by American singer Michael Jackson.

Music & Me or Music and Me may also refer to:

- "Music and Me" (Michael Jackson song), 1973
- Music & Me (Nate Dogg album), 2001
- Music and Me (Sarah Geronimo album), 2009
- Music & Me (SIRPAUL album), 2010
