= The Original Soul of Michael Jackson =

Remix album by Michael Jackson
- Released: October 1987
- Recorded: September 1969 – March 1975: 1984–87 (overdubbing, remixing)
- Length: 39:11
- Label: Motown
- Producer: Hal Davis

Michael Jackson chronology
Bad (1987)	The Original Soul of Michael Jackson (1987)	The Michael Jackson Mix (1987)

Singles from The Original Soul of Michael Jackson
- 1. "Twenty-Five Miles" Released: October 1987

Professional ratings
Review scores
Source	Rating
Christgau's Record Guide	B+

The Original Soul of Michael Jackson is a remix album by American singer Michael Jackson. It features songs recorded early in his career mainly during the 1970s and remixed in 1987 before its release that year by Motown.

== Release ==
While the album claims that it "contains music never before released", the only new song available was a re-dubbed cover of Edwin Starr's 1970 hit "Twenty-Five Miles", sung by the Jackson Five and solely credited to Michael. The original recording of the song was included on the 2009 set Hello World: The Motown Solo Collection. Some songs were newly edited on the album, with a newly dubbed version of "Dancing Machine". "Ain't No Sunshine" also had slightly different vocals and a modern drum machine was added to "Twenty-Five Miles". "Melodie" was planned for a single in an effort to promote the record in the US, but was scrapped for a promo-only single "Twenty-Five Miles"/"Up On The Housetop".

== Critical reception ==
Reviewing in Christgau's Record Guide: The '80s (1990), Robert Christgau wrote, "Once you get past the slipshod cynicism of Motown's catalogue exploitation, you have to admit that this mostly remixed, sometimes synthed-up mishmash has its charms and even uses—that in fact it's superior to the 'real' 1975 best-of the label long ago deleted. I love the previously unreleased 'Twenty-Five Miles' and the preteen-sings-the-blues 'Doggin' Around,' could live without the two J5 non hits, and will no doubt pull this down when I want to remember 'Dancing Machine' and 'Rockin' Robin.'"

== Track listing ==
No.	Title	Writer(s)	Album	Length
1.	"Twenty-Five Miles" (1987 remix)	Johnny Bristol, Harvey Fuqua, Edwin Starr	New release	3:27
2.	"Dancing Machine" (1987 remix)	Hal Davis, Don Fletcher, Dean Parks	G.I.T.: Get It Together and Dancing Machine	3:50
3.	"It's Too Late to Change the Time" (1987 remix)	Pam Sawyer, Leon Ware	G.I.T.: Get It Together	3:49
4.	"Melodie" (edited version)	Mel Larson, Jerry Marcellino, Deke Richards	Farewell My Summer Love	3:18
5.	"Ain't No Sunshine" (1987 remix)	Bill Withers	Got to Be There	3:05
6.	"Got to Be There"	Elliot Willensky	Got to Be There	3:22
7.	"Doggin' Around" (edited version)	Jackie Wilson	Music & Me	2:19
8.	"Rockin' Robin"	Leon Rene	Got to Be There	2:30
9.	"If I Don't Love You This Way" (1987 remix)	Pam Sawyer, Leon Ware	Dancing Machine	3:24
10.	"You've Got a Friend" (1987 remix)	Carole King	Got to Be There	4:36
11.	"Forever Came Today" (edited alternative version)	Lamont Dozier, Brian Holland, Edward Holland Jr.	Moving Violation	5:54
Total length:				39:11
