= Michael Jackson's Journey from Motown to Off the Wall =

2016 American documentary film

- Film poster
- Directed by: Spike Lee
- Produced by: Spike Lee; John Branca; John McClain
- Starring: Michael Jackson
- Cinematography: Kerwin DeVonish
- Edited by: Ryan Denmark; Barry Alexander Brown
- Production companies: 40 Acres and a Mule Filmworks; Sony Legacy; Optimum Productions
- Distributed by: Showtime
- Release dates: January 24, 2016 (2016 Sundance Film Festival); February 5, 2016 (Showtime)
- Running time: 110 minutes
- Country: United States
- Language: English

Michael Jackson's Journey from Motown to Off the Wall is a 2016 documentary film co-produced and directed by Spike Lee, chronicling the rise of pop star Michael Jackson through the creation of his landmark solo album, Off the Wall (1979). It is the second Michael Jackson-focused documentary Lee has made, after Bad 25 (2012). The film premiered on January 24, 2016, at the 2016 Sundance Film Festival.

== Premise ==
The documentary goes over archived footage of Jackson and stars other celebrities. The film also documents the rise of Jackson's career.

== Cast ==
- Michael Jackson (archival footage)
- Jackie Jackson
- Marlon Jackson
- Joe Jackson
- Katherine Jackson
- Pharrell Williams
- Questlove
- John Legend
- The Weeknd
- Carole Bayer Sager
- John Branca
- Kobe Bryant
- Misty Copeland
- Lee Daniels
- Suzanne De Passe
- David Foster
- Berry Gordy
- Gladys Knight
- L.A. Reid
- Smokey Robinson
- Mark Ronson
- Rod Temperton
- Stevie Wonder
- Joseph Vogel
- Lemon Andersen
- David Byrne
- Rob Cohen
- Bobby Colomby
- Barry Michael Cooper
- Gamble & Huff
- Siedah Garrett
- Susaye Greene
- Rodney Jerkins
- Quincy Jones
- John Leguizamo
- Greg Phillinganes
- Fatima Robinson
- DJ Spinna
- Esperanza Spalding
- Valerie Simpson
- Joel Schumacher
- Bruce Swedien
- Verdine White
- Walter Yetnikoff
- Larry Carlton

== Release ==
Michael Jackson's Journey from Motown to Off the Wall premiered at the Sundance Film Festival at Park City, Utah on January 24, 2016. It was shown on the American television network Showtime on February 5. The film was released along with a reissue of the original Off the Wall album on February 26.
