= One Day in Your Life =

One Day in Your Life may refer to:

- One Day in Your Life (album), an album by Michael Jackson
- "One Day in Your Life" (Michael Jackson song)
- "One Day in Your Life" (Anastacia song)
- "One Day in Your Life" (54-40 song)

== See also ==
- "One Day of Your Life"
