= One Day in Your Life (album) =

Compilation album by Michael Jackson
- Released: March 25, 1981
- Recorded: May 1973 – December 1974 (North American version); July 1971 – December 1974 (UK version)
- Length: 33:58
- Label: Motown

Michael Jackson chronology
Off the Wall (1979)	One Day in Your Life (1981)	E.T. the Extra-Terrestrial (1982)

Singles from One Day in Your Life
- 1. "One Day in Your Life" Released: March 20, 1981; 2. "We're Almost There" Released: July 20, 1981 (UK)

Professional ratings
Review scores
Source	Rating
AllMusic	3/5 stars

One Day in Your Life is a compilation released by Michael Jackson's former record label Motown Records, consisting of both solo and Jackson 5 tracks recorded with Motown, and released on March 25, 1981. It was the first Jackson album released in the 1980s. Most of the tracks are from Jackson's fourth studio album, Forever, Michael (1975). The other songs were taken from Jackson 5 releases to pad the album's running time. Motown later admitted that the album was just a quick cash grab generated from the success of Jackson's Off the Wall (1979).

The compilation's title track, which had already been released on Forever, Michael in 1975, was released as a single and became a worldwide hit, especially in the United Kingdom, where it became Jackson's first number-one hit as a solo artist.

== Track listing ==
=== US release ===
No.	Title	Writer(s)	Length
1.	"One Day in Your Life" (from Forever, Michael, 1975)	Sam Brown III; Renée Armand	4:12
2.	"Don't Say Goodbye Again" (from G.I.T.: Get It Together, 1973)	Pam Sawyer; Leon Ware	3:22
3.	"You're My Best Friend, My Love" (from Joyful Jukebox Music, 1976)	Brown; Christine Yarian	3:23
4.	"Take Me Back" (from Forever, Michael)	Eddie Holland; Brian Holland	3:22
5.	"We've Got Forever" (from Forever, Michael)	Elliot Willensky	3:09
6.	"It's Too Late to Change the Time" (from G.I.T.: Get It Together)	Sawyer; Ware	3:53
7.	"You Are There" (from Forever, Michael)	Brown; Randy Meitzenheimer; Yarian	3:20
8.	"Dear Michael" (from Forever, Michael)	Hal Davis; Willensky	2:33
9.	"I'll Come Home to You" (from Forever, Michael)	Freddie Perren; Yarian	3:00
10.	"Make Tonight All Mine" (from Joyful Jukebox Music)	Perren; Yarian	3:18
Total length:			32:20

=== UK release ===
No.	Title	Writer(s)	Length
1.	"One Day in Your Life" (from Forever, Michael, 1975)	Sam Brown III; Renée Armand	4:12
2.	"We're Almost There" (from Forever, Michael)	Eddie Holland; Brian Holland	3:42
3.	"You're My Best Friend, My Love" (from Joyful Jukebox Music, 1976)	Brown; Christine Yarian	3:23
4.	"Don't Say Goodbye Again" (from G.I.T.: Get It Together, 1973)	Pam Sawyer; Leon Ware	3:22
5.	"Take Me Back" (from Forever, Michael)	Eddie Holland; Brian Holland	3:22
6.	"It's Too Late to Change the Time" (from G.I.T.: Get It Together)	Sawyer; Ware	3:53
7.	"We've Got a Good Thing Going" (from Ben, 1972)	The Corporation	2:59
8.	"You Are There" (from Forever, Michael)	Brown; Randy Meitzenheimer; Yarian	3:20
9.	"Doggin' Around" (from Music & Me, 1973)	Lena Agree	2:52
10.	"Dear Michael" (from Forever, Michael)	Hal Davis; Elliot Willensky	2:33
11.	"Girl Don't Take Your Love From Me" (from Got to Be There, 1972)	Willie Hutch	3:46
12.	"I'll Come Home to You" (from Forever, Michael)	Freddie Perren; Yarian	3:00
Total length:			40:11

== Charts ==
=== Weekly charts ===
Chart (1981)	Peak position
UK Albums (OCC)	29
US Billboard Top LPs & Tape	144
US Cashbox Top Albums	133
