= Joseph Vogel =

Joseph Vogel can refer to:

- Joseph Vogel (author), American author, scholar and popular culture critic
- Joseph Vogel (executive) (1895–1969), American film studio executive
- Joe Vogel (basketball) (born 1973), American / Lebanese basketball player
- Joe Vogel (politician) (born 1997), American politician in the Maryland House of Delegates
