= Twenty-Five Miles =

1969 single by Edwin Starr

"Twenty Five Miles"
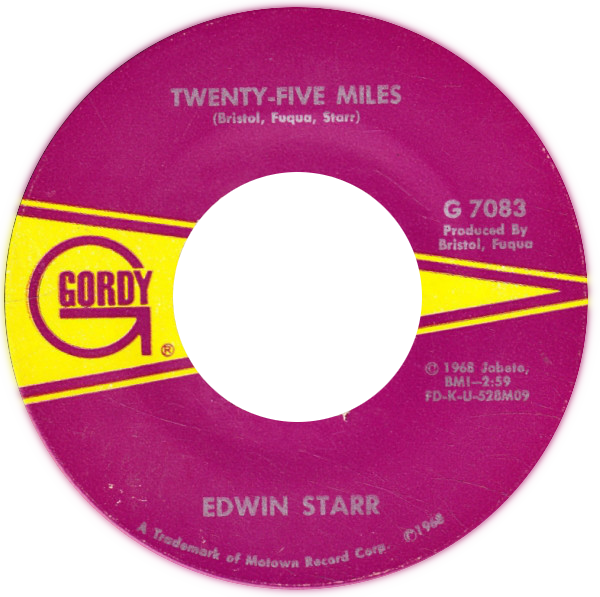
- Side-A label of US vinyl single

Single by Edwin Starr

from the album 25 Miles
- B-side: "Love Is My Destination"
- Released: January 2, 1969
- Recorded: 1968
- Genre: R&B; soul
- Length: 3:17
- Label: Gordy
- Songwriters: Bert Berns; Jerry Wexler; Edwin Starr; Johnny Bristol; Harvey Fuqua
- Producers: Johnny Bristol; Harvey Fuqua

Edwin Starr singles chronology
"Grits Ain't Grocery" (1968)	"Twenty Five Miles" (1969)	"Oh How Happy" (1969)

"Twenty-Five Miles" is a song written by Johnny Bristol, Harvey Fuqua, and Edwin Starr for Starr's second album, 25 Miles (1969). The song was considered sufficiently similar to "32 Miles out of Waycross" by Hoagy Lands (also recorded as "Mojo Mama" by both Wilson Pickett and Don Varner), written by Bert Berns and Jerry Wexler, that Berns and Wexler were eventually given co-writing credits. Essentially the same "counting down the miles" concept had appeared earlier in the lyrics of Mark W. Mcintyre and William Olofson's song "Tucumcari", recorded by Jimmie F. Rodgers in 1959.

It was Starr's first success following his move from Ric-Tic Records to Motown (as Motown bought out Ric-Tic and all its artists). The song was a huge hit in the US, making the top ten on both the Pop chart (#6) and R&B chart (#6), #8 in Canada, and peaked at #36 on the UK Singles Chart. "Twenty-Five Miles" proved to be Starr's second-biggest US hit, ranking below his signature song (and #1 smash) "War". His pair of 1979 disco singles would later outdo the song's performance on the UK charts, as "Contact" and "H.A.P.P.Y. Radio" were both UK top ten hits.

Starr's version was popular on the UK's Northern soul scene.

In 1989, Starr was seen on stage in an appearance of the Cookie Crew's mimed performance on Top of the Pops, the BBC chart show in the UK, with him miming repeatedly to the lyric "I got to keep on" which was sampled from "Twenty-Five Miles" in the No. 17 hit "Got to Keep On" of April that year.

== In popular culture ==
A shortened remix of this version was used as the theme song for NFL Network's coverage of the 2011 NFL scouting combine. The song was used by Visa in their 2016 global Olympic campaign film.

The song also shares strong similarities to the theme song for As it Happens, "Curried Soul" by Moe Koffman, which dates from 1968.

Edwin Starr's version appeared in the 1987 film Adventures in Babysitting and in the 2016 Visa Commercial "Carpool - Road to Rio with Team USA Athletes".

The song was featured playing after the opening scene of Bad Times at the El Royale, when it transitions to 1969.

== Michael Jackson version ==
"Twenty-Five Miles"

Single by Michael Jackson

from the album The Original Soul of Michael Jackson
- B-side: "Up on the Housetop"
- Released: October 1987
- Label: Motown
- Songwriters: Bert Berns; Jerry Wexler; Edwin Starr; Johnny Bristol; Harvey Fuqua
- Producer: Hal Davis

Michael Jackson singles chronology
"Bad" (1987)	"Twenty-Five Miles" (1987)	"The Way You Make Me Feel" (1987)

The Jackson 5 recorded a cover version of "Twenty-Five Miles" in 1969, but it was not heard until its inclusion on the Motown compilation album, The Original Soul of Michael Jackson, in 1987, with Michael Jackson being given sole performer credit for the track. It was not the original recording, however, as it included drum machine overdubs; the original featured a hard-driving drum track by Uriel Jones, one of the Funk Brothers.

Jackson's version of "Twenty-Five Miles" was released as a single in the US to promote The Original Soul of Michael Jackson. The single was backed by the Christmas song "Up on the Housetop". The original recording of the song was included on the 2009 set, Hello World: The Motown Solo Collection.

== Other versions ==
In 1969, Clarence Reid released a cover of "Twenty Five Miles" on his 1969 ATCO release Dancin' With Nobody But You Babe.

In 1969, Patrick Samson realized a cover in Italian language titled "Basta" (That's enough) for his album Crimson and clover (Soli si muore) (Carosello Records, PLP 325) published in Italy and Canada.

In 1971, Melba Moore featured "Twenty Five Miles" in a medley with the song "Walk a Mile in My Shoes" on her album Look What You're Doing to the Man.
