= Man in the Music: The Creative Life and Work of Michael Jackson =

- First edition
- Author: Joseph Vogel
- Language: English
- Genre: Biography, non-fiction
- Publisher: Sterling Publishing
- Publication date: 2011
- Publication place: United States
- Media type: Print (hardcover)
- ISBN: 9781402779381

Man in the Music: The Creative Life and Work of Michael Jackson is a non-fiction book written by Joseph Vogel, published in June 2011 by the Sterling Publishing.

== Reception ==
Man in the Music: The Creative Life and Work of Michael Jackson, was described by the Associated Press as "a fascinating read and really a must have for any fan of Jackson." Filmmaker Spike Lee characterized it as having "brilliantly cracked the DNA, the code, the artistry of Michael Joseph Jackson."
