= SIRPAUL =

American musician

- Born: Paul Cucinello; January 5, 1976 (age 50); Port Jefferson, New York, United States
- Genres: Pop, Electronica
- Occupation: Singer-Songwriter-Producer
- Instruments: Vocals, keyboards
- Years active: 1998–present
- Label: Controversial Records (1998–present)
- Website: www.sirpaul.com/

SIRPAUL (born Paul Cucinello, January 5, 1976) is an American music producer, singer/songwriter, and performer based in New York, New York. SIRPAUL described his music as "Next Generation New Wave Electro-Folk, combining acoustic and electric guitars with old school Hip-Hop and ElectroBeats."

== Biography ==
=== Early life ===
SIRPAUL was born in Port Jefferson, New York, to Joanne and Albert Cucinello. They had five children; Brendan, Lisa, Christine and Cherylyn. Both Joanne and Albert were musicians. "My father was a drummer and he played on The Ed Sullivan Show once with his band and my mother and her sister were a singing duo called Judy & Jo. They signed to Capitol Records when they were teenagers and they had put out some records. One of them was an answer song to Elvis Presley's "Good Luck Charm" called "Don't Wanna Be Your Good Luck Charm". Their songs were GREAT!"

Growing up musical household, SIRPAUL and his siblings, were encouraged toward music. Aged 12 SIRPAUL played the keyboard his parents had bought, writing and making music with his sister, Cherylyn. Growing up, SIRPAUL was surrounded by the music of his siblings. "They each had artists they listened to the most: Madonna, Prince, Stevie Nicks, George Michael, and Van Halen. You can hear all of those elements in my music...But I was OBSESSED with Cyndi Lauper. My entire room was wallpapered with images of her. I had every single piece of memorabilia that was available and I would sit in my room and listen to She's So Unusual over and over and over! I really felt like she was the only person in the world that I could relate to at the time because she looked crazy and I did too!"

By 16, SIRPAUL and Cherylyn put together a freestyle/techno group called Double Exposure and made their first demo tape. The group was offered a contract from a company in Japan, but turned it down as they felt it was not what they were looking for.

=== Recording career ===
In 1998, SIRPAUL moved from Port Jefferson to New York City to pursue his dreams. He also recorded his eponymous first album, SIRPAUL, now out of print. The album was recorded in his room, and remixed it himself. He released his first single, I Disagree. Shortly thereafter, SIRPAUL showed up at the club Twirl in Chelsea with single in hand, and soon DJ Alex Lauterstein was spinning the song in the club, and SIRPAUL was making a name for himself with a sound inspired by the New Wave music of the 1980s, with a Euro-flavor. His first performance of I Disagree was at El Flamingo, on West 21st Street between 10th and 11th Avenues in Chelsea, following a performance of The Donkey Show. He had two backup dancers for that performance: Andreas Anastasis and Teresa Napolitano.

In 2000, he wrote and recorded "Sexual.Human.Being." an album that first introduced acoustic guitars and old-school hip hop sampling into his overall sound. The album artwork was created as a collaboration between Andreas Anastasis (Creative Director), Karina Sonowski (Logo, Icon, Graphic Design & Digital), Christopher Kassowski (photographer) and SIRPAUL (Executive Producer). The photographs displayed SIRPAUL nude, draped in white satin sheets, in a Christ-like pose on a bed. The imagery was to represent religious sacrifice, magic, and self-empowerment. The album was never released. "I loved that album so much. It was so personal to me, but I found myself with limited funds at the time and, without the ability to distribute the album properly, I felt it was pointless for me to release it. The people I gave it to saw huge growth in my songwriting and singing ability but I still felt I could do better. I wanted my next statement to make more of a bold statement. I know it will be a limited edition release one day...for die hard fans." The song "Clarity (The Center of Insanity)" was the only club single and was playing regularly at the NYC hot spot of the moment Cheetah, primarily by DJ Merritt. SIRPAUL performed "Clarity" there and continued to perform at Cheetah throughout the earlier part of his career.

In Spring 2003, he released the EP Thrust, as well as the single of the same name. The video for Thrust was a safe-sex PSA that stirred up some controversy by showing every possible configuration of couples in erotic situations using condoms as a sexy accessory. The video did not pass standards and was not cleared for air although there was nothing more graphic in it than same sex kissing and very clever editing. That summer, he released the album Robotika, which was an experiment in electronic "sound manipulation." No real instruments were used and Robotika became more of an alter ego for SIRPAUL, under which some of his more experimental remixes and production are categorized. Next SIRPAUL found himself writing and recording much more in the Pop vein. The result was the album Switch, released in the Spring of 2004. The sound and style more mainstream Pop, with Middle Eastern and R&B influences. SIRPAUL set out on a tour to support the album, which included a highly touted show in Paris, France, at the Le Red Light for a party called Paris Rouge with DJ Alex Lauterstein and sold-out shows in NYC at the legendary Club Fez and The Cutting Room. He was also named one of the Top Emerging Artists by the Gay City News.

Dismantle was released in 2006, with a moody sound incorporating some rock instrumentation, as well as Techno and Breakbeat elements. "I think Dismantle was just about taking yourself apart and examining every single aspect of your person and the way you love both yourself and other people differently sometimes. I was just creating and that's what came out." The only video off Dismantle was for the song "Addicted" (Directed by Andreas Anastasis.) The following year, SIRPAUL was approached by French producers Human Body to write and record vocals for an electropop dance song. "I heard the song and fell in love with it immediately. I wrote the lyrics while I was out dancing at Mr. Black in NYC and immediately recorded the vocals and remixed it myself. The song was called Do U and was featured the following year on the "Do U" Remix EP, headlined by the song Do U. The song went into heavy rotation in the clubs and for many NYC DJs, and a super polished music video followed. That video (Directed by Andreas Anastasis) went into heavy rotation on MTV/LOGO and eventually was named one of the Top 10 videos of 2008. The popularity lead to strong sales on iTunes and the song being chosen to be the theme for Logo's 2008 NewNowNext Awards.

Late in 2008, he released Objectified, SIRPAUL's return to his dancefloor roots. Objectified was built off of the song "Do U" and had a strong, masculine, electronic feel. "The running theme in all of my work is always the concept of Technology vs. Nature. I just think these two forces are constantly battling to dominate one another." Videos for the title song and 'Killer' made quite the splash on LOGO, while the video for 'Swinger' made an impact online, censorship issues kept the video from airing on TV. "You can only bleep out so many words from a song before the entire impact is lost. The video was supposed to be an LGBT take on a stereotypical hip-hop video. I truly believe that if it were a heterosexual rap video it would've been played in heavy rotation."

SIRPAUL's music was licensed by noted design house Giorgio Armani for various campaigns, including their Giorgio Armani Show Online website.

On June 1, 2010, SIRPAUL released Music & Me. For this album, SIRPAUL adopted the "Not Equal" symbol as his icon. The concept was developed with childhood friend, longtime collaborator, and renowned lifestyle designer Anthony Passarelli. The album release coincided with a sold-out CD Release Show at the Triad Theater in Manhattan and an appearance on the Red Carpet at the 2010 Logo NewNowNext Awards in Los Angeles. When asked about the album, he said "I feel like this album is like a shattered mirror image of me. All these songs are fragments that reflect different aspects of my personality and I always bare my soul through my music." Music & Me scored positive reviews, including favorable comparisons to Lady Gaga from That's My Jam Radio and references to George Michael, Fischerspooner and Nine Inch Nails from ElectroQueer. Plans are in the works to extend the tour and the first scheduled music video to be produced will be for the lead single Music & Me. The video for "Colors" (a combination live concert/previous work montage video Directed by Andreas Anastasis) is said to be released in 2011.

=== Music producer ===
SIRPAUL is the President/CEO and co-founder of Controversial Records, has written over 350 songs and has remixed others for artists like Britney Spears, La Roux, Sacha Sacket and The Inertia Kiss.

== Discography ==
=== Albums ===
Release date	Title	Record label
1998	SIRPAUL	Controversial Records
2000	Sexual.Human.Being – Unreleased	Controversial Records
June 10, 2003	Robotika	Controversial Records
April 4, 2004	Switch	Controversial Records
October 24, 2006	Dismantle	Controversial Records
November 4, 2008	Objectified	Controversial Records
January 6, 2009	Objectified (Deluxe Version)	Controversial Records
June 1, 2010	Music & Me	Controversial Records

=== EPs and remixes ===
Release date	Title	Record label
May 28, 2003	Thrust EP	Controversial Records
July 6, 2006	The MuthaF***in' Remixes	Controversial Records
October 5, 2007	Do U Remix EP	Controversial Records
March 10, 2009	Objectified: The Remixes	Controversial Records
September 19, 2009	Swinger Remix EP	Controversial Records
October 1, 2009	Swinger: The Alex Lauterstein Dream Project	Controversial Records
October 5, 2009	Where The Wild Things Are	Controversial Records
March 10, 2010	Killer Remix	Controversial Records
May 24, 2010	Music & Me Remix EP	Controversial Records
