= Off the Wall =

1979 studio album by Michael Jackson

- Original 1979 cover

Studio album by Michael Jackson
- Released: August 10, 1979
- Recorded: December 4, 1978 – June 3, 1979
- Studios: Allen Zentz (Hollywood, California); Westlake (Los Angeles, California); Cherokee (Hollywood, California)
- Genres: Disco; funk; pop; R&B
- Length: 42:24
- Labels: Epic; CBS
- Producers: Quincy Jones; Jackson (co.)

Michael Jackson chronology
The Best of Michael Jackson (1975)	Off the Wall (1979)	One Day in Your Life (1981)

Singles from Off the Wall
- 1. "Don't Stop 'Til You Get Enough" Released: July 10, 1979; 2. "Rock with You" Released: October 9, 1979; 3. "Off the Wall" Released: November 16, 1979; 4. "She's Out of My Life" Released: April 1, 1980; 5. "Girlfriend" Released: July 4, 1980 (UK only)

Alternate cover
- Special Edition 2001 cover; remained in prints/distribution until 2016

Off the Wall is the fifth studio album by the American singer Michael Jackson, released on August 10, 1979, by Epic Records. It was Jackson's first album released through Epic Records, and the first produced by Quincy Jones, whom he previously collaborated with while working on the 1978 film The Wiz. Off the Wall was crafted from disco, pop, funk, R&B, soft rock and Broadway ballads. Its lyrical themes include escapism, liberty, hedonism and romance. The album features songwriting contributions from Stevie Wonder, Paul McCartney, Rod Temperton, Tom Bahler, and David Foster, alongside three tracks penned by Jackson himself.

Before recording his next album, Jackson desired to create a record showcasing creative freedom and individualism for the first time. Off the Wall was widely branded as a reintroduction for him. It became Jackson's highest charting on the Billboard Top LPs & Tape chart, staying in the Top 10 for over 8 months. It was also number 1 on the Top Black Albums chart for 16 weeks and was the best-selling album of 1980 in the US. The album has retrospectively been hailed as a landmark release of the disco era.

Five singles were released from Off the Wall, two of which were Billboard Hot 100 number-one singles: "Don't Stop 'Til You Get Enough" and "Rock with You". Another two, "Off the Wall" and "She's Out of My Life", were Top 10 hits; this made Jackson the first solo artist to have four Top 10 hits on the Hot 100 from one album. The album was controversially nominated for just two Grammy Awards, with Jackson winning Best R&B Vocal Performance, Male, for "Don't Stop 'Til You Get Enough". It won Favorite Soul/R&B Album at both the 1980 and 1981 American Music Awards.

Off the Wall received widespread critical acclaim, with it being credited as a significant departure from Jackson's previous work for Motown and hailed as a major breakthrough for him. It has sold over 20 million copies worldwide, making it one of the best-selling albums of all time. In 2025, it was certified diamond by the Recording Industry Association of America. The album continues to be lauded as one of the greatest albums in popular music, with many critics praising it as Jackson's magnum opus. In 2008, it was inducted into the Grammy Hall of Fame.

== Background ==
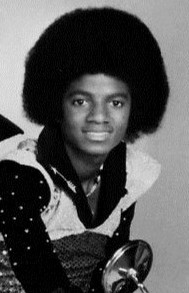
Jackson in 1977

Between 1972 and 1975, Michael Jackson released a total of four solo studio albums with Motown: Got to Be There, Ben, Music & Me, and Forever, Michael. These were released as part of the Jackson 5 franchise, and produced successful singles such as "Got to Be There", "Ben" and a remake of Bobby Day's "Rockin' Robin". The Jackson 5's sales, however, began declining in 1973, and the band members chafed under Motown's strict refusal to allow them creative control or input. Although the group scored several top 40 hits, including the top five disco single "Dancing Machine" and the top 20 hit "I Am Love", the Jackson 5 (minus Jermaine Jackson) left Motown in 1975. The Jackson 5 signed a new contract with CBS Records in June 1975, first joining the Philadelphia International Records division and then Epic Records. As a result of legal proceedings, the group was renamed the Jacksons. After the name change, the band continued to tour internationally, releasing five more studio albums between 1976 and 1984: their self-titled eleventh album, Goin' Places, Destiny, Triumph, and Victory, as well as a live concert album in 1981. During that period, Michael was not only the lead singer, but also the chief songwriter for the group, writing or co-writing such hits as "Shake Your Body (Down to the Ground)", "This Place Hotel" and "Can You Feel It".

In 1978, Jackson starred as Scarecrow in the film musical The Wiz. The musical scores were arranged by Quincy Jones, who formed a partnership with Jackson during the film's production and agreed to produce the singer's solo album Off the Wall. Jackson was dedicated to the role, and watched videotapes of gazelles, cheetahs and panthers in order to learn graceful movements for his part in the movie. Jones recalled working with Jackson as one of his favorite experiences from The Wiz, and spoke of Jackson's dedication to his role, comparing his acting style to Sammy Davis Jr. Critics panned The Wiz upon its October 1978 release, but Jackson's performance as the Scarecrow was one of the only positively reviewed elements of the film, with critics noting that Jackson possessed "genuine acting talent" and "provided the only genuinely memorable moments." Of the results of the film, Jackson stated: "I don't think it could have been any better, I really don't". In 1980, Jackson stated that his time working on The Wiz was "my greatest experience so far...I'll never forget that".

Attention was paid to the album cover, which shows Jackson smiling, wearing a tuxedo and trademark socks. John Branca, Jackson's manager stated, "The tuxedo was the overall plan for the Off the Wall project and package. The tuxedo was our idea, the socks were Michael'". While Off the Wall was a reintroduction for Jackson, the album was released shortly after the infamous Disco Demolition Night, which increased the growing backlash against disco music's domination of the charts.

== Production ==
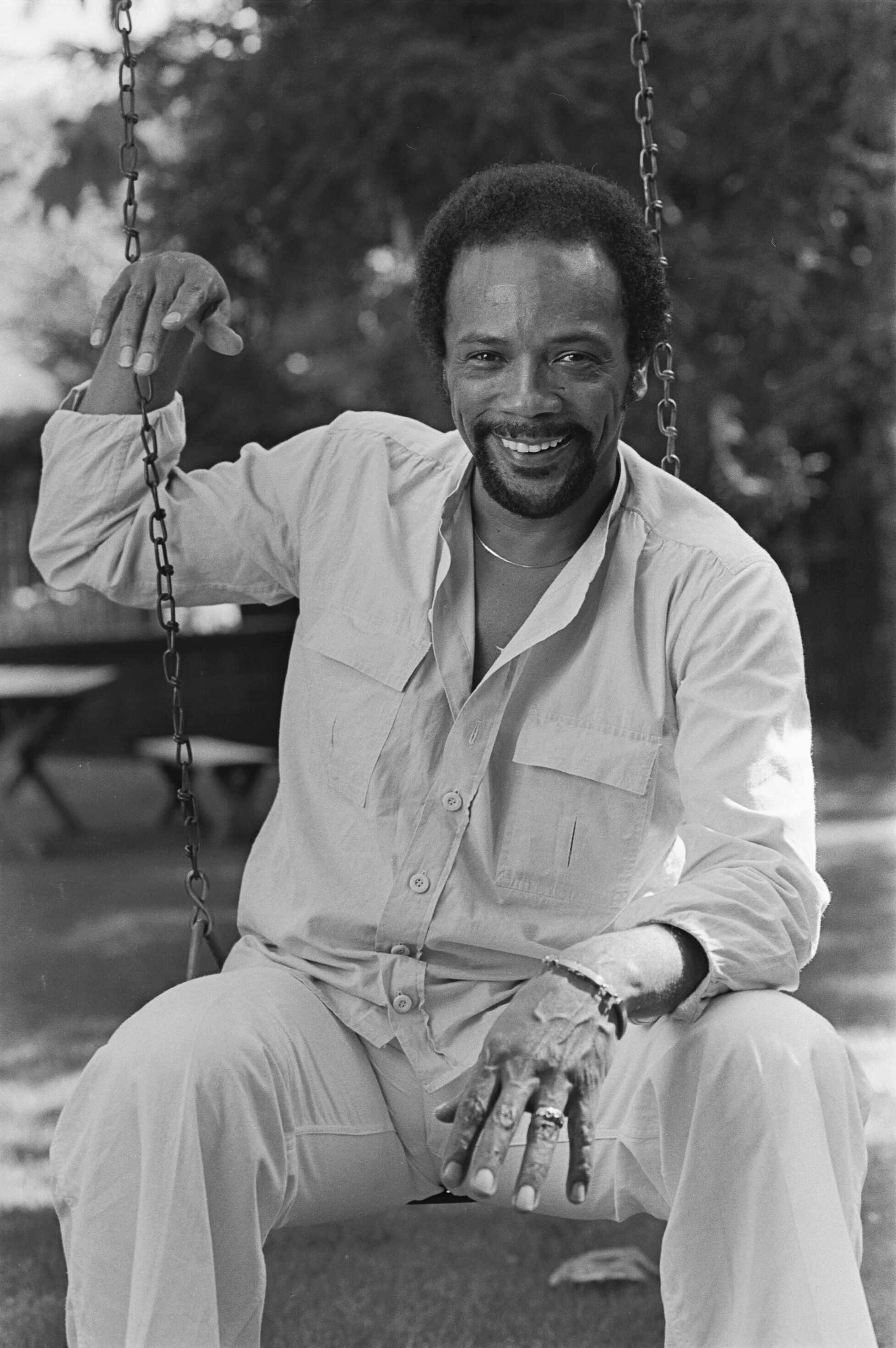
Quincy Jones (pictured in 1980) produced Off the Wall. This was the first of three successful collaborations with Jackson.

When Jackson began the Off the Wall project he was not sure what he wanted as the final result; however, he did not want another record that sounded like the Jacksons, but rather he wanted more creative freedom, something he had not been allowed on prior albums. Jackson's father Joseph also approved of the project and allowed him to record it on the condition that it did not interfere with group business. Despite his brothers' desire to work with him, Jackson wanted to make the album independently of his family. Nevertheless, his brother Randy still contributed percussion to "Don't Stop 'Til You Get Enough".

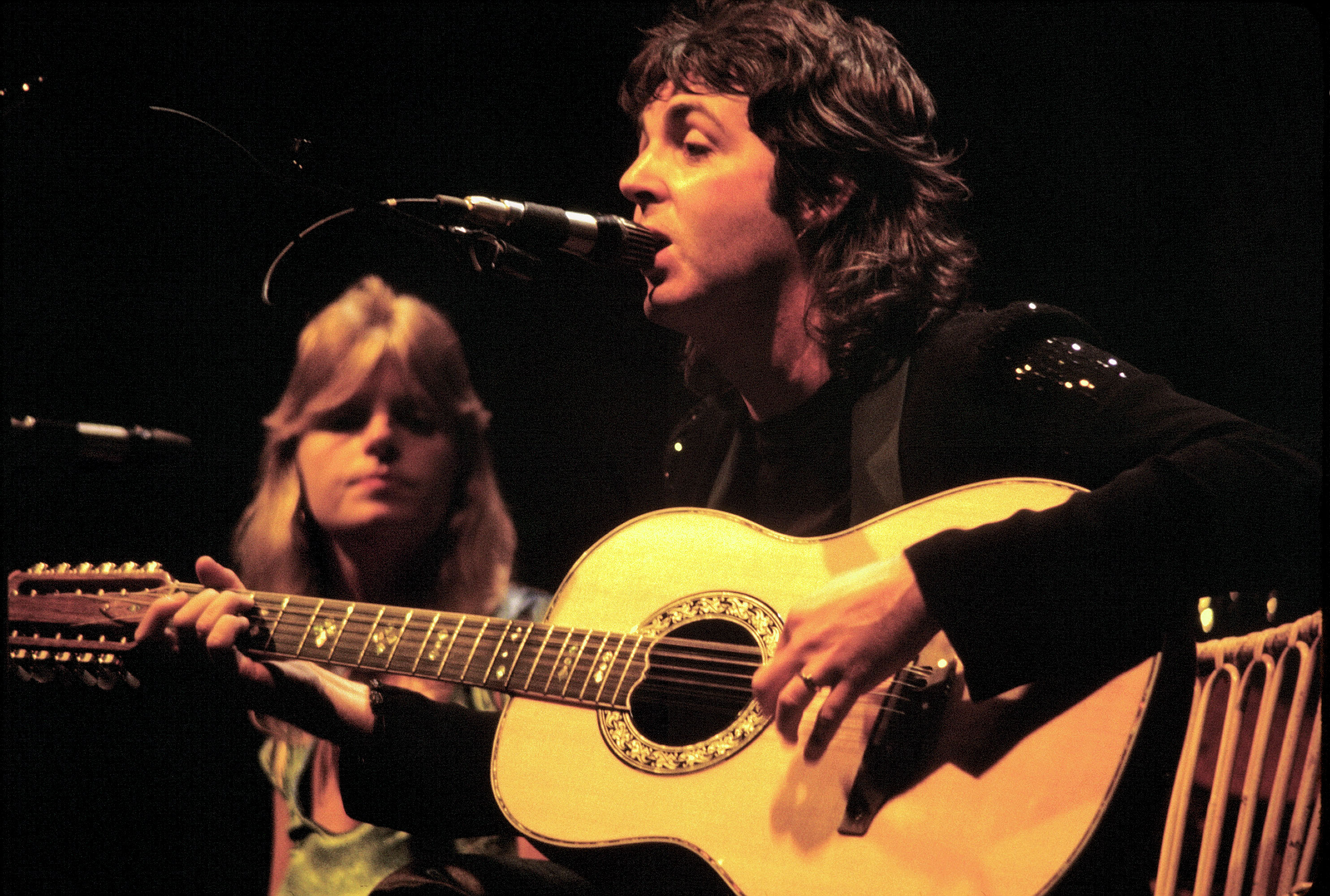
"Girlfriend" is a cover of the 1978 original by English rock band Wings, written by Paul McCartney.

Jones produced Off the Wall, with co-production credit given to Jackson on the songs he wrote for the album. Songwriters included Jackson, Heatwave's Rod Temperton, Stevie Wonder and Paul McCartney. All sessions took place at Los Angeles County-based recording studios, with recording taking place between December 4, 1978, and June 3, 1979. The majority of the album was recorded in December 1978. "Get on the Floor" was recorded in April 1979, with the remaining songs "Girlfriend", "I Can't Help It" and "Burn This Disco Out" in May-June 1979. Rhythm tracks and vocals were recorded at Allen Zentz Recording, the horn section's contributions took place at Westlake Audio, and string instrumentation was recorded at Cherokee Studios in West Hollywood. Following the initial sessions, audio mixing was handled by Grammy-winning engineer Bruce Swedien at Westlake Audio, after which the original tapes went to the A&M Recording Studio, also located in L.A., for mastering. Swedien would later mix the recording sessions for Jackson's next album and his most well-known work, 1982's Thriller. Jones recalled that, at first, he found Jackson to be very introverted, shy and non-assertive.

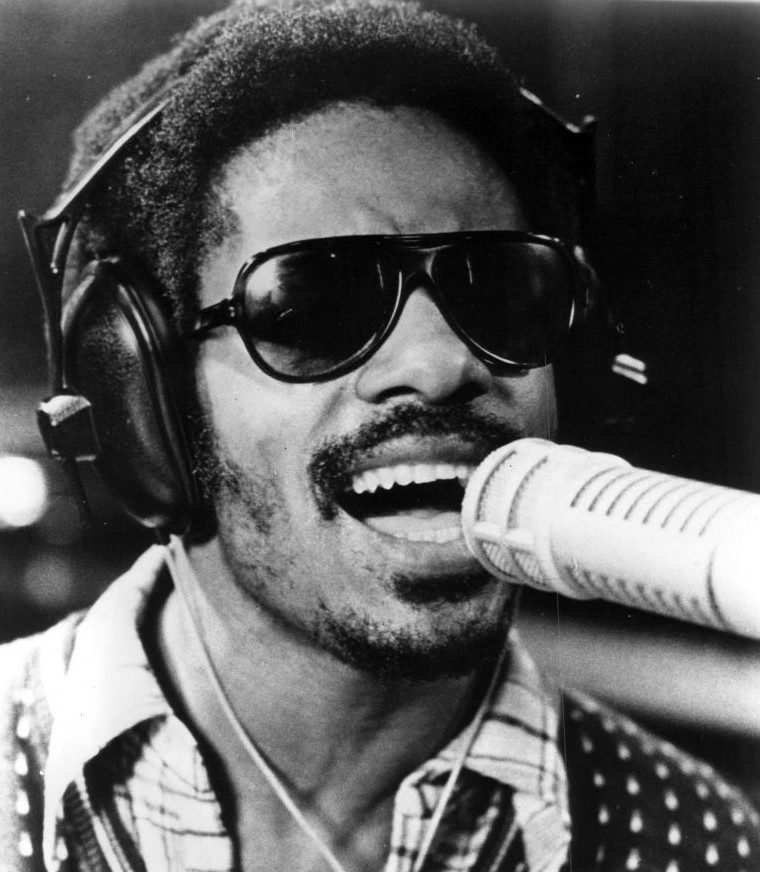
Stevie Wonder co-wrote "I Can't Help It" with Susaye Greene.

"She's Out of My Life" had been written for Jones by Tom Bahler three years earlier. Jackson heard and enjoyed it, and Jones allowed him to use it on the record. Jones called in Heatwave's keyboardist Rod Temperton to write three songs. The intention was for Jackson and Jones to select one of his songs, but Jackson, liking them all, included all of them in the final cut. Jackson stayed up all night to learn the lyrics to these songs instead of singing from a sheet. He finished the vocals to these three Temperton songs in two recording sessions. Temperton took a different approach to his songwriting after spending some time researching the background to Jackson's music style. Temperton mixed his traditional harmony segments with the idea of adding shorter note melodies to suit Jackson's aggressive style. Jackson wrote "Don't Stop 'Til You Get Enough" after humming a melody in his kitchen. After listening to hundreds of songs, Jackson and Jones decided upon a batch to record. In hindsight, Jones believed they took a lot of risks in the production of Off the Wall and the final choice of album tracks.

== Music and vocals ==
Music critics Stephen Thomas Erlewine and Stephen Holden of AllMusic observed that Off the Wall was crafted from R&B, funk, disco-pop, soul, soft rock, and Broadway ballads. Prominent examples include the ballad "She's Out of My Life", the funk tune "Workin' Day and Night", and the disco song "Get on the Floor". "I Can't Help It" is a jazz piece. Quincy Jones in his autobiography compares Jackson to other jazz singers, noting that Jackson "has some of the same qualities as the great jazz singers I'd worked with: Ella, Sinatra, Sassy, Aretha, Ray Charles, Dinah. Each of them had that purity, that strong signature sound and that open wound that pushed them to greatness." "She's Out of My Life" is a melodic pop ballad. The end of the former song showed an "emotional" Jackson crying as the track concluded. Of the song, rhythm and blues writer Nelson George proclaimed, "[It] became a Jackson signature similar to the way "My Way" served Frank Sinatra. The vulnerability, verging on fragility that would become embedded in Michael's persona found, perhaps, its richest expression in this wistful ballad". "Rock with You" is a romantic, mid-tempo song. The album's songs have a tempo ranging from 66 beats per minute on "She's Out of My Life", to 128 on "Workin' Day and Night".

With the arrival of Off the Wall in the late 1970s, Jackson's abilities as a vocalist were well regarded; Erlewine described him as a "blindingly gifted vocalist". At the time, Rolling Stone compared his vocals to the "breathless, dreamy stutter" of Stevie Wonder. Their analysis was also that "Jackson's feathery-timbered tenor is extraordinarily beautiful. It slides smoothly into a startling falsetto that's used very daringly". Writer, journalist and biographer J. Randy Taraborrelli expressed the opinion that Jackson sings with "sexy falsetto" vocals in "Don't Stop 'Til You Get Enough". Taraborrelli also stated, "Fans and industry peers alike were left with their mouths agape when Off the Wall was issued to the public. Fans proclaimed that they hadn't heard him sing with such joy and abandon since the early Jackson 5 days".

== Release and commercial reception ==
Off the Wall was released on August 10, 1979. It peaked at number three on the Billboard Top LPs & Tape chart and number one on the Billboard R&B Albums chart, staying at number one on the latter chart for 16 weeks. It remained in the top 10 of the Top LPs & Tape chart for nearly 9 months. It sold three million copies in the United States before the end of 1979, while the Jacksons were still on tour. According to Rolling Stone and The National Leader, it was the best-selling album of 1980 in the US. The album's success led to the start of a nine-year partnership between Jackson and Jones; their next collaboration would be Thriller, which is the best-selling album of all time. By the time Thriller was released in 1982, Off the Wall had sold seven million copies worldwide.By 1995, the album hit 6 million in US and 11 million worldwide. In 2025, the Recording Industry Association of America certified the album diamond for sales of 10 million copies in the US. Globally, its sales stand at over 20 million copies worldwide. It has also gained Platinum certifications in eleven other countries.

On October 16, 2001, a special edition reissue of Off the Wall was released by Sony Records to promote his upcoming album Invincible, with the album cover using the original back cover instead (only showcasing the bottom half of his legs). It was re-released again on February 26, 2016, in its original album cover. The material found strong praise from critics more than 20 years after the original release. On January 7, 2016, Sony Music and The Estate of Michael Jackson announced that Off the Wall would be reissued and packaged with a new documentary directed by Spike Lee titled Michael Jackson's Journey from Motown to Off the Wall. The reissue and documentary were both released on February 26, 2016.

== Singles ==
"Don't Stop 'Til You Get Enough" was released on July 10, 1979, under Epic Records which was Jackson's first solo single not released under Motown Records. The song topped the Billboard Hot 100 on October 10, making it Jackson's first solo number one single since "Ben", seven years prior.

"Rock with You" also reached number one on the Billboard Hot 100, becoming Jackson's third number-one single of his career and it also reached the top spot on R&B charts. It spent four consecutive weeks at number one starting January 19, 1980, and was the fourth-biggest single of 1980.

In February, the album's title track was released as a single, and went to number 10 on the Billboard Hot 100 chart and became a top 10 hit in four countries. "She's Out of My Life" was released after that, also reaching number 10 on the Billboard Hot 100 chart in June. The song was also one of Jackson's slowest songs, with a tempo of 66 beats per minute. Off the Wall became the first album by a solo artist to generate four US top 10 hits.

== Critical reception ==
Professional ratings
Review scores
Source	Rating
Christgau's Record Guide	A
Melody Maker	5/5 stars
Record Mirror	4/5 stars
Rolling Stone	5/5 stars
Sounds	4.5/5 stars

Off the Wall received widespread critical acclaim and was hailed as a major artistic breakthrough for Jackson. In a review of the album, Rolling Stone magazine contributor Stephen Holden praised Jackson's maturity and transition from his early Motown material, stating that the album "represents discofied post-Motown glamour at its classiest." Holden went on to compare Jackson to Stevie Wonder, another Motown performer who began recording at a young age and gained critical acclaim for his transition. Dennis Hunt of Los Angeles Times called Off the Wall "one of the year’s best R&B albums" and particularly praises the influence of Jones' production on Jackson.

Retrospective ratings
Review scores
Source	Rating
AllMusic	5/5 stars
Blender	5/5 stars
Encyclopedia of Popular Music	5/5 stars
Entertainment Weekly	A−
MusicHound Rock	5/5 stars
Pitchfork	10/10
Q	5/5 stars
The Rolling Stone Album Guide	4.5/5 stars
Tom Hull – on the Web	A
Uncut	5/5 stars

Bill William lauded Off the Wall in Kingsport Times, declaring the album as "the finest example we have heard of the sheer power and potency" of Jackson as a soloist up to that point. In a review for Melody Maker, Phil McNeill expressed the opinion that in Off the Wall Jackson sounded comfortable, confident and in control. He believed "Don't Stop 'Til You Get Enough" had a "classy" introduction and that it was the best song on the album. He also praised "Rock with You", describing it as "masterful". McNeill concurred with a colleague that Jackson was "probably the best singer in the world right now in terms of style and technique".

Several critics particularly noted the improvement in Jackson's vocal ability. In The Village Voice, critic Robert Christgau credited Jackson and Jones with "fashion[ing] the dance groove of the year" and stated that "Michael's vocabulary of grunts, squeals, hiccups, moans, and asides is a vivid reminder that he's grown up." Giving the album a favorable review in Smash Hits, David Hepworth said that Jackson "sings like an angel". Hepworth also wrote for Sounds, sharing the view that Off the Wall is a "gem" and highlighting "She’s Out Of My Life" as a "hauntingly beautiful ballad". Record Mirror writer, Paul Sexton, was praiseful of album's slower songs, such as "She's Out of My Life" and "I Can't Help It". Pat Stevens of Evening Post praised the album for illustrating Jackson's "flexibility".

=== Awards ===
Off the Wall was ranked amongst the best albums of the year in both 1979 and 1980 in its respective Pazz & Jop polls by The Village Voice. In 1980, Jackson won the Grammy Award for Best Male R&B Vocal Performance for “Don’t Stop ‘Til You Get Enough”. In the same year, Jackson won three awards at the American Music Awards: Favorite Soul/R&B Album, Favorite Male Soul/R&B Artist and Favorite Soul/R&B Single for "Don't Stop 'til You Get Enough". In the following year, Off the Wall won Favorite Soul/R&B Album again and Jackson won Favorite Soul/R&B Male Artist.

Despite its commercial and critical success, Jackson felt Off the Wall should have made a much bigger impact, and was determined to exceed expectations with his next release. In particular, Jackson was disappointed that he had only won a single Grammy Award at the 1980 Grammy Awards. The album also did not get nominated for Album of the Year, which was viewed as a surprise. Jackson stated that "[i]t was totally unfair that it didn't get Record of the Year [sic], and it can never happen again."

=== Rankings ===
In 2003, Off the Wall was ranked number 68 on Rolling Stone's list of The 500 Greatest Albums of All Time, maintaining the ranking in a 2012 revised list until the current revision of 2020 which has been ranked at number 36. In Blender's 100 Greatest American Albums of All Time list, it was ranked number 13. The album was included in the 1001 Albums You Must Hear Before You Die. In Colin Larkin's third edition of the All Time Top 1000 Albums (2000), it was ranked at number 235. It was also ranked number seven in the Soul/R&B – All Time Top 50 albums. The National Association of Recording Merchandisers (NARM), in conjunction with the Rock and Roll Hall of Fame, ranked the album at number 80 of the Definitive 200 Albums of All Time. In 2008, Off the Wall was inducted into the Grammy Hall of Fame. It was ranked number 56 in The Guardian's list of the 100 Best Albums Ever. Additionally, The Guardian's list of the 50 Key Events in the History of Pop Music ranked 'Michael Jackson starts work on Off the Wall' at number 23. The album was ranked at number 85 on Consequence of Sound's list of The 100 Greatest Albums of All Time. In 2015, Billboard ranked Off the Wall at number 149 on its list of the Greatest of All Time Billboard 200 Albums. It was also ranked third in their list of the Greatest of All Time Top R&B/Hip-Hop Albums, out of 100 albums. Uncut ranked Off the Wall at number 46 on its list of the 200 Greatest Albums Of All Time. In 2019, The Independent included it in its list of The 40 Best Albums to Listen to Before You Die. In 2025, Spin ranked it as Jackson's best album.

=== Accolades ===
Organization	Country	Accolade	Year	Ref.
Grammy Awards	United States	Grammy Hall of Fame	2008	
American Music Awards	United States	Favorite Soul/R&B Album	1980	
American Music Awards	United States	Favorite Soul/R&B Album	1981	
Billboard Music Awards	United States	Top Black Album	1980	
Billboard	United States	Greatest of All Time Billboard 200 Albums (Ranked #149)	2015	
National Association of Recording Merchandisers (NARM) / Rock and Roll Hall of Fame	United States	Definitive 200 Albums of All Time (Ranked #80)	2007	
Quintessence Editions	United Kingdom	1001 Albums You Must Hear Before You Die	2003	
Rolling Stone	United States	500 Greatest Albums of All Time (Ranked #68)	2012	
Rolling Stone	United States	500 Greatest Albums of All Time (Ranked #36)	2020	

== Legacy and influence ==
=== Impact ===
"...the album that established him (Jackson) as an artist of astonishing talent and a bright star in his own right. This was a visionary album, a record that found a way to break disco wide open into a new world where the beat was undeniable."

— Stephen Thomas Erlewine, AllMusic

Off the Wall is widely considered by critics and publications to be one of the greatest albums of all time. Although it was not as commercially successful as Bad and Dangerous, the album is often debated by critics between itself and Thriller as Jackson's best. According to some music journalists, it epitomized the peak of the disco era, being part of a group of landmark disco albums including Donna Summer's Bad Girls (1979) and Bee Gees' Saturday Night Fever (1977).

James Wilson-Taylor of PopBuzz believed that the album influenced artists including the Weeknd, Justin Bieber and Beyoncé. The Weeknd cited it as a major influence on his artistry, saying, "I found my falsetto, because of Off the Wall [and] "Don't Stop 'Til You Get Enough"...I always use Michael [Jackson] as, first and foremost, a vocal inspiration, and Off the Wall was definitely the one that made me feel like I could sing." Britni Danielle of Ebony highlighted Chris Brown's "Fine China" for being a "surprisingly lush and infectious tune reminiscent of Jackson's Off the Wall ['vibe']". Regarding the comparison to Jackson's Off the Wall 'vibe', Brown himself stated "I really wanted to kind of bring that essence of music back with that single." Writing for Pitchfork, Ryan Dombal said that the influence of "I Can't Help It" on Pharrell Williams's "off-kilter funk cannot be overstated".

During Sean Combs' acceptance speech for the Recording Academy's Salute to Industry Icon award at the Clive Davis' Pre-Grammy Gala, where he expressed his disappointment towards the Grammy Awards due to the lack of big award wins for Black artists, Combs' spoke on Thriller being Jackson's "revenge" for "not being nominated [enough] for Off the Wall". Combs' also dedicated his award to Off the Wall. A writer of PR Newswire credits the album for "smashing the ceiling on record sales for black artists [and] ushering in an exciting new era of R&B-to-pop crossover airplay, chart, marketing and sales trends not seen before in modern pop music."

According to the same writer,

Off the Wall transcended music and entertainment altogether [to Black America]. The success of the album marked a level of national and international achievement that conjured pride in a culture that as late as the end of the 1970s was still fighting for the kind of social acceptance that Jackson's album received. Because of Off the Wall's indelible influence, 21st century artists as disparate as Beyonce, Pharrell, Kendrick Lamar and The Weeknd all have a blueprint they turned to for creating their superstardom.

=== Reappraisal ===
Retrospective reviews have continued to praise Off the Wall for its appeal in the 21st century. Blender gave the record a full five star review stating that it was, "A blockbuster party LP that looked beyond funk to the future of dance music, and beyond soul ballads to the future of heart-tuggers—in fact, beyond R&B to color-blind pop. Hence, the forgivable Wings cover". AllMusic gave the record a five star review, praising the record's disco-tinged funk and mainstream pop blend, along with Jackson's songwriting and Jones' crafty production. The publication believed, "[Off the Wall] is an enormously fresh record, one that remains vibrant and giddily exciting years after its release".

A writer for Rolling Stone wrote "the unstoppable dance tracks on Off the Wall – sculpted by Jackson and producer Quincy Jones – remain more or less perfect examples of why disco didn't suck. 'Don't Stop 'Til You Get Enough', 'Rock With You' and 'Burn This Disco Out' still get the party started today." David O'Donnell, writing for the BBC, described Off the Wall as "one of the finest pop albums ever made" and showcasing Jackson as a "gifted and versatile vocalist, comfortable performing on ballads as well as upbeat disco tracks." According to O'Donnell, "many critics believe as an album it has not been bettered by any of Michael Jackson's subsequent output." Tom Ewing of The Guardian regarded Off the Wall as superior to Thriller: "... we can say with more certainty that Thriller will keep its position as the highest-selling LP ever – but it's Off the Wall that critics routinely hail as Jackson's masterpiece." and also wrote "... with [Off the Wall] Jackson and his mentor Jones made pop's great coming-of-age album." In August 2018, on the occasion of what would have been Jackson's 60th birthday, Entertainment Weekly reevaluated the album, giving it a score of A−, saying that the album was Jackson's first musical statement as an adult, that it was "a featherweight rapture of disco-flecked R&B" containing dance-floor favorites and some lesser songs. Wilson-Taylor also claimed that Off the Wall is "arguably, the greatest pop album of all time" and credited it for being the pathway of Jackson becoming a "genuine musical phenomenon".

Nelson George wrote of Jackson and his music, "the argument for his greatness in the recording studio begins with his arrangements of 'Don't Stop 'Til You Get Enough'. The layers of percussion and the stacks of backing vocals, both artfully choreographed to create drama and ecstasy on the dance floor, still rock parties in the 21st century". A writer for Rolling Stone credited the album for "inventing modern pop as we know it". Ryan Burleson of Consequence of Sound wrote that the album "almost immediately affirmed" Jackson as the "preeminent pop talent of his day" and praised Off the Wall as an "instant classic that married the prevailing sounds of the funk, soul, and disco-inflected 70s with an innovative zeal" that has rarely been replicated since. Burleson also called it a "masterpiece" and a "groundbreaking pop record for the masses that continues to be transformative even today." Blender wrote "[Off the Wall] was the first suggestion that disco need not be tacky" and that the album's "immaculately produced, pre-Thriller tracks are now too familiar to shock, but in 1979, they were revolutionary." With regards to the album, the magazine also wrote "perfection is timeless."

== Track listing ==
Side one
No.	Title	Writer(s)	Length
1.	"Don't Stop 'Til You Get Enough"	Michael Jackson	6:05
2.	"Rock with You"	Rod Temperton	3:40
3.	"Workin' Day and Night"	Jackson	5:14
4.	"Get on the Floor"	Jackson; Louis Johnson	4:50
Total length:			19:49

Side two
No.	Title	Writer(s)	Length
1.	"Off the Wall"	Temperton	4:06
2.	"Girlfriend"	Paul McCartney	3:04
3.	"She's Out of My Life"	Tom Bahler	3:38
4.	"I Can't Help It"	Stevie Wonder; Susaye Greene	4:30
5.	"It's the Falling in Love" (featuring Patti Austin)	Carole Bayer Sager; David Foster	3:48
6.	"Burn This Disco Out"	Temperton	3:42
Total length:			22:48 42:37

Notes

- The original LP, cassette pressings and some early CD issues pressed in Japan contain the original mixes of "Rock with You" and "Get on the Floor".
- Every song on the album is available either as A or B sides of single releases both in 7- or 12-inch format. Seven of the songs out of ten saw US release either as A or B sides and the UK had the remaining three songs available also as A or B sides of singles. As of 2000 the singles are available in both 7- and 12-inch formats and few different mixes, even though some releases have been more targeted to a UK/Europe audience. The original album mix of the title track is not available as a single, and the original mix was kept for future reissues of the album. Unlike the two songs mentioned in the upper note, the single mix did not replace the title track on all future reissues.
- "Don't Stop 'Til You Get Enough", "I Can't Help It", and a live version of "Workin' Day and Night" appear in the biopic, Michael.

== Personnel ==
Personnel as listed in the album's booklet.

- Michael Jackson – lead vocals (all tracks), background vocals (1–6, 9, 10), co-producer (1, 3, 4), percussion (1, 3), vocal arrangements (1, 3, 4, 6), rhythm and percussion arrangements (1, 3)
- Patti Austin – lead and backing vocals (track 9)
- Tom Bahler – rhythm arrangement (track 6), vocal arrangement (9)
- Michael Boddicker – synthesizer (track 2), programming (5, 8)
- Larry Carlton – guitar (track 7)
- Paulinho Da Costa – percussion (tracks 1, 3–5, 8, 10)
- George Duke – synthesizer and synthesizer programming (tracks 5, 6)
- David Foster – synthesizer (tracks 6, 9), rhythm arrangement (9)
- Jim Gilstrap – background vocals (tracks 1, 4)
- Gary Grant – trumpet (tracks 1–6, 8–10)
- Richard Heath – percussion (track 1)
- Marlo Henderson – guitar (tracks 1, 2, 5, 6, 9, 10)
- Jerry Hey – horn arrangements, trumpet, and flugelhorn (tracks 1–6, 8–10)
- Kim Hutchcroft – baritone saxophone, tenor saxophone, and flute (tracks 1–6, 8–10)
- Randy Jackson – percussion (track 1)
- Mortonette Jenkins – background vocals (tracks 1, 4)
- Augie Johnson – background vocals (tracks 1, 4)
- Louis Johnson – bass guitar (tracks 1, 3–10), rhythm arrangement (4)
- Quincy Jones – producer (all tracks), rhythm arrangements (4, 6, 9), vocal arrangements (6, 9)
- Johnny Mandel – strings arrangement (tracks 7, 8)
- Paulette McWilliams – background vocals (tracks 1, 4)
- Greg Phillinganes – Rhodes piano (tracks 1, 3, 5–10), synthesizer (1, 2, 5, 8), clavinet (4), rhythm arrangements (1, 3, 6, 8)
- Steve Porcaro – synthesizer programming (tracks 6, 9)
- Bill Reichenbach Jr. – trombone (tracks 1–6, 8–10)
- John Robinson – drums (tracks 1–6, 8–10), percussion (3)
- Bruce Swedien – recording engineer and audio mixer (all tracks)
- Rod Temperton – rhythm and vocal arrangements (tracks 2, 5, 10)
- Phil Upchurch – guitar (track 3)
- Gerald Vinci – concertmaster (tracks 1, 2, 4, 7, 8)
- Bobby Watson – bass guitar (track 2)
- Wah Wah Watson – guitar (tracks 4, 6, 9)
- David Williams – guitar (tracks 1–3, 5, 10)
- Larry Williams – tenor saxophone, alto saxophone, and flute (tracks 1–6, 8–10), alto saxophone solo (6)
- Zedrick Williams – background vocals (tracks 1, 4)
- Hawk Wolinski – Fender Rhodes (track 2)
- Stevie Wonder – rhythm arrangement (track 8)
- Ben Wright – strings arrangements (tracks 1, 2, 4)

== Charts ==
=== Weekly charts ===
Initial chart performance for Off the Wall
Chart (1979–82)	Peak position
Australian Albums (Kent Music Report)	1
Canada Top Albums/CDs (RPM)	4
Dutch Albums (Album Top 100)	8
Finnish Albums (Suomen virallinen lista)	9
French Albums (SNEP)	27
German Albums (Offizielle Top 100)	25
New Zealand Albums (RMNZ)	2
Norwegian Albums (VG-lista)	4
Swedish Albums (Sverigetopplistan)	26
UK Albums (Official Charts)	5
US Billboard 200	3
US Billboard Top Black Albums	1
US Cashbox Top Albums	2

Post-1980s chart performance for Off the Wall
Chart (2003–2026)	Peak position
Australian Albums (ARIA)	17
Belgian Albums (Ultratop Flanders)	22
Belgian Albums (Ultratop Wallonia)	8
Canadian Albums (Billboard)	74
Croatian International Albums (HDU)	31
Czech Albums (ČNS IFPI)	39
Danish Albums (Hitlisten)	34
Dutch CombiAlbum (MegaCharts)	54
Dutch Midprice Albums (MegaCharts)	3
Dutch Vinyl Albums (MegaCharts)	21
Finnish Albums (Suomen virallinen lista)	50
French Albums (SNEP)	27
German Albums (Offizielle Top 100)	37
Greek Albums (IFPI)	2
Hungarian Albums (MAHASZ)	25
Italian Albums (FIMI)	9
Japanese Hot Albums (Billboard Japan)	21
Lithuanian Albums (AGATA)	31
Polish Albums (ZPAV)	28
Portuguese Albums (AFP)	30
Spanish Albums (Promusicae)	11
Swiss Albums (Schweizer Hitparade)	27
UK Albums (Official Charts)	3

=== Year-end charts ===
1979 year-end chart performance for Off the Wall
Chart (1979)	Position
US Billboard Top Black Albums	49

1980 year-end chart performance for Off the Wall
Chart (1980)	Position
Australian Albums (Kent Music Report)	6
Canada Top Albums/CDs (RPM)	10
New Zealand Albums (RMNZ)	7
UK Albums (OCC)	7
US Billboard Top LPs & Tape	3
US Billboard Top Black Albums	1

== Certifications and sales ==
Certifications and sales for Off the Wall
Region	Certification	Certified units/sales
Australia (ARIA)	5× Platinum	350,000^{^}
Canada (Music Canada)	Platinum	300,000
Denmark (IFPI Danmark)	Platinum	20,000^{‡}
France (SNEP)	Platinum	1,000,000
Hong Kong (IFPI Hong Kong)	Gold	10,000^{*}
Italy (FIMI) sales since 2009	Platinum	50,000^{‡}
Japan	—	500,000
Netherlands (NVPI)	Platinum	100,000^{^}
New Zealand (RMNZ)	6× Platinum	90,000^{^}
Taiwan sales as of 2009	—	80,000
United Kingdom (BPI)	6× Platinum	1,800,000^{^}
United States (RIAA)	Diamond	10,000,000^{‡}
Summaries
Europe (IFPI) re released edition	Platinum	1,000,000^{*}
Worldwide	—	20,000,000
^{*} Sales figures based on certification alone.^{^} Shipments figures based on certification alone.^{‡} Sales+streaming figures based on certification alone.

== Release history ==
Release dates and formats for Off the Wall
Region	Date	Edition(s)	Format(s)	Label(s)	Ref.
United States	August 10, 1979	Standard	LP; Cassette	Epic	
United Kingdom	September 8, 1979	Standard	LP; Cassette	Epic	
United States	October 16, 2001	Special Edition (re-issue)^{[a]}	CD	Epic; Legacy; Sony	
Various	February 26, 2016	Re-issue^{[b]}	CD + DVD/Blu-ray	MJJ; Epic; Legacy	
Various	January 17, 2025	Audiophile Edition^{[c]}	Hybrid SACD; LP	Mobile Fidelity Sound Lab; Epic	

Notes

- ^{^[a]} part of a re-issue promotion of solo albums released under Epic.
- ^{^[b]} featuring a documentary Michael Jackson‘s Journey from Motown to Off the Wall directed by Spike Lee.
- ^{^[c]} sourced from the original master tapes.
