= Joseph Vogel (author) =

American music journalist

- Born: Provo, Utah, United States
- Occupation: Author
- Website: www.joevogel.net

Joseph Vogel is an American author, scholar, and entrepreneur. He is the author of several books, including Man in the Music: The Creative Life and Work of Michael Jackson and This Thing Called Life: Prince, Race, Sex, Religion, and Music, and the founder of the outdoor brand, Timpanogos Hiking Co.

== Career ==
Vogel writes about music, literature, film and popular culture. His critically acclaimed 2011 book, Man in the Music: The Creative Life and Work of Michael Jackson, was described by the Associated Press as "a fascinating read and really a must have for any fan of Jackson." Filmmaker Spike Lee characterized it as having "brilliantly cracked the DNA, the code, the artistry of Michael Joseph Jackson." Vogel's work has been featured in The Atlantic, The Huffington Post, and PopMatters. In 2013, he was ranked #15 by Sonifly in a list of "Most Influential Music Journalists in Social Media."

Vogel has published several books, including This Thing Called Life: Prince, Race, Sex, Religion, and Music, James Baldwin and the 1980s: Witnessing the Reagan Era and The Obama Movement. He has appeared in several documentaries, including Spike Lee's Bad 25 (film) and Michael Jackson's Journey from Motown to Off the Wall. Vogel received his PhD from the University of Rochester, and was associate professor and Chair of the English Department at Merrimack College in Massachusetts. In 2022, he founded Timpanogos Hiking Co., an outdoor brand based in Utah. He is currently CEO of Timpanogos Hiking Co.

== Biography ==
Vogel made national headlines in 2004 when, as Student Vice President of Academics at Utah Valley University, he invited film maker Michael Moore to speak on campus. The invitation incited an uproar amongst the predominantly conservative Utah County community. Vogel subsequently wrote a book about the experience entitled Free Speech 101; the book became a 2007 Independent Publisher Book Award Finalist. An award-winning documentary, This Divided State (in which Vogel appears), also recounts the story of Michael Moore's controversial visit to Utah Valley.

== Published works ==
- Vogel, Joseph (2018). This Thing Called Life: Prince, Race, Sex, Religion, and Music. New York: Bloomsbury Academic. ISBN 978-1501333972.
- Vogel, Joseph (2018). James Baldwin and the 1980s: Witnessing the Reagan Era. Illinois: University of Illinois Press. ISBN 978-0252083365.
- Vogel, Joseph (2012). Michael Jackson and the Reinvention of Pop. New York: Baldwin Books. ISBN 978-1977682901.
- Vogel, Joseph (2011). Earth Song - Michael Jackson and the Art of Compassion. New York: BlakeVision Books. ISBN 978-1976106477.
- Vogel, Joseph (2011). Man in the Music - The Creative Life and Work of Michael Jackson. New York: Sterling Publishing. ISBN 978-1402779381.
- Vogel, Joseph (2007). The Obama Movement - Why Barack Obama Speaks to America's Youth. Lincoln, Nebraska: iUniverse, Inc. ISBN 978-0595467037.
- Vogel, Joseph (2006). Free Speech 101- The Utah Valley Uproar Over Michael Moore. Silverton, Idaho: Windriver Publishing. ISBN 1886249318.
