= Music & Me (SIRPAUL album) =

Studio album by SIRPAUL
- Released: June 1, 2010
- Recorded: January 1–30, 2010
- Genre: R&B, pop, electronica
- Length: 51:27
- Label: Controversial Records
- Producer: SIRPAUL

SIRPAUL chronology
| Objectified (2008) | Music & Me (2010) |

Singles from Music & Me
- 1. "Music & Me" Released: May 24, 2010

Professional ratings
Review scores
| Source | Rating |
|---|---|
| That's My Jam Radio | (not rated) |

Music & Me is a studio album by American singer SIRPAUL, recorded and released in 2010. The artist wrote, produced and recorded all the songs on the album. The album contains pop music, with influences of R&B, electronica, and dance. On Logo's NewNowNext program (featuring the artist with interview clips as well as his videos), SIRPAUL described his music as "Next Generation New Wave Electro-Folk, combining acoustic and electric guitars with old school Hip-Hop and ElectroBeats."

== Track listing ==
| No. | Title | Writer(s) | Length |
|---|---|---|---|
| 1. | "Don't Stop (Break the Beat)" | SIRPAUL | 4:41 |
| 2. | "Give It Up" | SIRPAUL | 4:04 |
| 3. | "Music & Me" | SIRPAUL | 4:45 |
| 4. | "Deal With The Devil" | SIRPAUL | 3:38 |
| 5. | "Colors" | SIRPAUL | 4:50 |
| 6. | "Love Taboo" | SIRPAUL | 4:00 |
| 7. | "U" | SIRPAUL | 5:08 |
| 8. | "Press Rewind" | SIRPAUL | 3:53 |
| 9. | "Loser Lover" | SIRPAUL | 3:34 |
| 10. | "Digital World" | SIRPAUL | 4:20 |
| 11. | "Mistaken" | SIRPAUL | 4:08 |
| 12. | "Shine" | SIRPAUL | 4:31 |
