= Forever, Michael =

Studio album by Michael Jackson
- Released: January 16, 1975
- Recorded: December 1973; October–December 1974
- Studio: Motown Recording Studios (Hollywood, Los Angeles)
- Genres: Soul; Philadelphia soul
- Length: 33:36
- Label: Motown
- Producers: Sam Brown III; Hal Davis; Brian Holland; Fonce Mizell; Freddie Perren

Michael Jackson chronology
Music & Me (1973)	Forever, Michael (1975)	The Best of Michael Jackson (1975)

Singles from Forever, Michael
- 1. "We're Almost There" Released: February 6, 1975; 2. "Just a Little Bit of You" Released: April 29, 1975; 3. "One Day in Your Life" Released: 1975 (UK)

Forever, Michael is the fourth studio album by American singer Michael Jackson, and his final one released by Motown Records, on January 16, 1975. The album is credited as having songs with funk and soul material. Eddie Holland, Brian Holland, Hal Davis, Freddie Perren, and Sam Brown III served as producers on Forever, Michael. It is the final album before Jackson's solo breakthrough with his next album, Off the Wall (1979), and has sold one million copies worldwide.

The album charted only in the United States, hitting number 101 on the Billboard 200 and number 10 on the Top Soul Albums chart. Unlike Jackson's previous studio albums, the album was not commercially successful worldwide, and it failed to chart outside of the US. However, it was generally well-received by contemporary music critics. As part of promotion for the album, three singles were released, all of which were moderate commercial successes on the US Billboard Hot 100 and other music charts worldwide.

In 1981, Motown released the compilation album One Day in Your Life, named after the third track from Forever, Michael. "One Day in Your Life" was released as a single and reached number one in the United Kingdom and several other countries. The album was reissued in 2009 after Jackson's death as part of the three-disc compilation album Hello World: The Motown Solo Collection.

== Background ==
The album was Jackson's fourth as a solo artist and would end up being his final album released with Motown. Following the release of their tenth album, Moving Violation, the Jackson 5 left for CBS Records except for Jermaine, who would remain with Motown until 1983. This album displayed a change in musical style for the then-16-year-old Michael Jackson, who adopted a smoother soul sound that he would continue to develop on his later solo albums for Epic Records, the label he would record on for the rest of his life. The album is also credited as having songs with funk elements.

Although his voice was already showing signs of changing on his previous album Music & Me two years earlier, this was also the first album to feature Jackson as a tenor rather than a boy soprano. Most of the tracks were recorded in 1974, and the album was originally set to be released that year but because of demand from the Jackson 5's huge hit "Dancing Machine", production on Jackson's album was delayed until the hype from that song died down. In 1975, Motown launched a joint promotional campaign with Forever, Michael and Moving Violation.

== Promotion ==
The album helped return Jackson to the top 40, aided by the singles "We're Almost There" and "Just a Little Bit of You", both written by the Holland Brothers (Eddie and Brian) of Holland–Dozier–Holland. In 1981, Motown released the compilation album One Day in Your Life to capitalize on the success of Jackson's Off the Wall on Epic. It included most of the tracks from Forever, Michael, and the title track went to number one in the UK and several other countries.

In 1984, the song "Dear Michael" was covered by Kim Fields.

== Critical reception ==
Professional ratings
Review scores
Source	Rating
AllMusic	3/5 stars
Entertainment Weekly	B−
Tom Hull	B+
The Village Voice	A−

Forever, Michael was generally well-received by music critics. Tom Hull described it as "transitional as you'd expect from the 16-year-old artist" and gave the album a B+ rating, while Robert Christgau from The Village Voice gave it an A−. Christgau found that

at 16, Michael's voice combines autonomy and helpless innocence in effective proportions. He also gets production help from Brian Holland (who begins one side like Barry White and the other like the Ohio Players) and a few romantic ballads (sure hit: "One Day in Your Life") that are as credible on their own terms as the rockers.

In a retrospective review, AllMusic editor William Ruhlmann called Forever, Michael a "more mature effort for the 16-year-old singer but lacked the contemporary dance style that had given Jackson and his brothers a career rebirth with 'Dancing Machine' the year before". While "Jackson sang appealingly, the arrangements were noticeably similar to many older Motown charts, and there was little here to hint that, four years hence, on his next solo album, Off the Wall, Jackson would emerge as a major star." Leah Greenblatt from Entertainment Weekly remarked that the album's "comparatively adult soul sound confirms he was ready to move on from his days as Gordy's bubblegum boy wonder. Still, the fairly standard midtempo grooves do little to foreshadow the sonic revelations that were soon to come."

== Track listing ==
Side one
No.	Title	Writer(s)	Producer(s)	Length
1.	"We're Almost There"	Eddie Holland; Brian Holland	B. Holland	3:41
2.	"Take Me Back"	E. Holland; B. Holland	B. Holland	3:29
3.	"One Day in Your Life"	Sam Brown III; Renée Armand	Brown	4:15
4.	"Cinderella Stay Awhile"	Mack David; Michael Burnett Sutton	Davis	3:11
5.	"We've Got Forever"	David; Elliot Willensky	Davis	3:12

Side two
No.	Title	Writer(s)	Producer(s)	Length
6.	"Just a Little Bit of You"	E. Holland; B. Holland	B. Holland	3:14
7.	"You Are There"	Brown; Randy Meitzenheimer; Christine Yarian	B. Holland	3:23
8.	"Dapper Dan"	Hal Davis; Royce Esters; Don Fletcher	Davis	3:08
9.	"Dear Michael"	Davis; Willensky	Davis	2:37
10.	"I'll Come Home to You"	Freddie Perren; Yarian	Fonce Mizell; Perren	3:05

== Personnel ==
Adapted from AllMusic.

- Michael Jackson – lead vocals
- David Blumberg – arranger
- Jim Britt – photography
- Hal Davis – producer
- L.T. Horn – engineer, mixing
- Eddy Manson – arranger, producer
- Freddie Perren – arranger, producer
- Sam Brown III – arranger, producer
- Russ Terrana – mixing
- Arthur G. Wright – arranger

== Charts ==
Weekly chart performance for Forever, Michael
Chart (1975)	Peak position
US Billboard 200	101
US Top R&B/Hip-Hop Albums (Billboard)	10
US Cashbox Top Albums	96

== Sales ==
Sales for Forever, Michael
Region	Certification	Certified units/sales
United States	—	100,000
