= Bad 25 (film) =

2012 documentary film by Spike Lee

- Film poster
- Directed by: Spike Lee
- Produced by: Spike Lee
- Starring: Michael Jackson
- Cinematography: Kerwin DeVonish
- Edited by: Barry Alexander Brown
- Production company: Optimum Productions
- Distributed by: Sony Music Entertainment
- Release date: August 31, 2012; (69th Venice International Film Festival)
- Running time: 123 minutes
- Country: United States
- Language: English

Bad 25 is a 2012 documentary film about the 25th anniversary of Michael Jackson's 1987 album Bad. The film was directed by Spike Lee who previously directed Jackson in the music video for "They Don't Care About Us", as well as directing the posthumous music video for the song "This Is It". A 25th anniversary edition reissue of the Bad album was also released on September 18, 2012, sharing the same name as the film.

The film was first screened at the 69th Venice International Film Festival on August 31, 2012 and was shown for a limited time in New York and Los Angeles theaters on October 19, 2012. The film made its television premiere on German television channel VOX on October 20, 2012 and in the United Kingdom on BBC2 on December 1, 2012. A 90-minute edited version of the film, running for 64 minutes without commercials, premiered in North America on ABC on November 22, 2012. The film was released on Blu-ray and DVD on July 2, 2013. The film is also available on the iTunes Store.

== Plot ==
The film includes behind the scenes clips of the recording session of Jackson's seventh studio album, Bad. It also features various people that had worked with Jackson during the Bad era (1986–1989) talking about the production of the album and the tour, acting or starring in some of Jackson's Bad singles and music videos including Sheryl Crow who was the duet partner with Jackson on the Bad World Tour for "I Just Can't Stop Loving You", Siedah Garrett, the original duet artist, talks about her experience with Jackson and many others. There are also interviews with influenced entertainers and artists.

== Cast ==
- Michael Jackson (archive footage)
- Glen Ballard
- Justin Bieber
- Rubén Blades
- Jim Blashfield
- John Branca
- Miko C. Brando
- Questlove
- Chris Brown
- Ollie E. Brown
- Mariah Carey
- Colin Chilvers
- Andraé Crouch
- Sheryl Crow
- Jeffrey Daniel
- Matt Forger
- Siedah Garrett
- Nelson George
- CeeLo Green
- Andre Harrell
- Jerry Hey
- Jermaine Jackson (archive footage)
- Quincy Jones (archive footage)
- Jerry Kramer
- Karen Langford
- Vincent Paterson
- Greg Phillinganes
- Richard Price
- Joe Pytka
- L.A. Reid
- Seth Riggs
- John Robinson
- Thelma Schoonmaker
- Martin Scorsese
- Danyel Smith
- Larry Stessel
- Steve Stevens
- Bruce Swedien
- Tatiana Thumbtzen
- Will Vinton
- Joseph Vogel
- Kanye West
- Stevie Wonder
- Walter Yetnikoff
- Whitney Houston (archive footage)

== Home media ==
The film was released on Blu-ray and DVD on July 2, 2013. It can only be purchased through the store on Michael Jackson's official website. The documentary is also available on Apple TV.
