= Just a Little Bit of You =

Single by Michael Jackson

from the album Forever, Michael
- B-side: "Dear Michael"
- Released: April 29, 1975
- Recorded: October 1974
- Genre: Soul
- Length: 3:15
- Label: Motown
- Songwriters: Eddie Holland; Brian Holland
- Producer: Brian Holland

Michael Jackson singles chronology
"We're Almost There" (1975)	"Just a Little Bit of You" (1975)	"One Day in Your Life" (1975)

"Just a Little Bit of You" is a song from the 1975 Michael Jackson album titled Forever, Michael. The album was Jackson's fourth and was released when he was 16 years old. Produced by Brian Holland, "Just a Little Bit of You" became Jackson's biggest solo hit in three years reaching number 23 on the US Pop Singles chart and number 4 on the Soul Singles chart. It was also the last Motown single released while Jackson was still signed to the label.

== Personnel ==
- Produced by Brian Holland
- Lead and background vocals by Michael Jackson
- Arrangement by James Anthony Carmichael

== Charts ==
Chart performance for "Just a Little Bit of You"
Chart (1975)	Peak position
Canada RPM Top Singles	43
US Billboard Hot 100	23
US Billboard Hot Soul Singles	4
