= Morning Glow =

Single by Michael Jackson

from the album Music & Me
- B-side: "My Girl"
- Released: July 27, 1973
- Recorded: December 1972 – January 1973
- Length: 3:36
- Label: Motown
- Songwriter: Stephen Schwartz
- Producer: Bob Gaudio

Michael Jackson singles chronology
"Happy" (1973)	"Morning Glow" (1973)	"Music and Me" (1973)

"Morning Glow" is a 1973 single released by Michael Jackson on the Motown label and written by Stephen Schwartz. It was the singer's second single release from the album Music & Me. The song was not released as a single in the US. Meanwhile, it was released in United Kingdom (Note: "Morning Glow" did not enter the UK Top 50, but peaked at No.5 in the Breakers Chart at 18 August 1973.), Ireland, Panama and Australia where it reached number 98. "Morning Glow" is a song from the musical Pippin.

== Charts ==
Chart performance for "Morning Glow"
Chart (1973)	Peak position
Australian ARIA Singles Chart	98
UK Singles Chart	55

== Credits ==
- Lead and background vocals by Michael Jackson
