= Happy (Bobby Darin song) =

1972 Single by Bobby Darin

"Happy", also known as "Happy (Love Theme From Lady Sings the Blues)", is a song written by Michel Legrand and Smokey Robinson and first recorded by Bobby Darin. The song was first released as a single by Bobby Darin on November 23, 1972, peaking #67 on the Billboard Hot 100, it was his last single to hit the chart. The song was included on his posthumous Motown LP Darin: 1936–1973.

A version of the song by Michael Jackson was featured on Jackson's 1973 album Music & Me. Robinson also recorded a version of the song, included on Robinson's 1975 album A Quiet Storm.

== Background ==
According to Robinson, the song was inspired by a melody from the film Lady Sings the Blues, which was originally composed by Michel Legrand. He explained, "I was looking at the movie one day, and I was listening to that melody, and I thought it was just such a beautiful melody, until I wanted to write some words for that melody, which I did, and I went and I sang them for Berry Gordy, and he was really upset because I didn't write them before he finished the movie so they could've been in the movie."

== Michael Jackson recording ==
"Happy"
- 1973 Australian single

Single by Michael Jackson

from the album Music & Me
- B-side: "In Our Small Way" (original release); "We're Almost There" (1983 re-release)
- Released: July 10, 1973 (original release); 1983 (re-release)
- Recorded: August 1972
- Genre: R&B; soul
- Length: 3:22
- Label: Motown
- Songwriters: Michel Legrand; Smokey Robinson
- Producer: Hal Davis

Michael Jackson singles chronology
"With a Child's Heart" (1973)	"Happy" (1973)	"Morning Glow" (1973)

Alternative cover
- 1983 UK re-release

Michael Jackson recorded the song for the Motown label in August 1972. The song featured on Jackson's album Music & Me on April 13, 1973. Its full title is "Happy (Love Theme from Lady Sings the Blues)", although Jackson's version was not featured in the film. There was an instrumental version used; however, it was not featured on the soundtrack for Lady Sings the Blues. Michael Jackson's single was first released in Australia on July 10, 1973, backed by "In Our Small Way" (from the album Got to Be There).

Jackson continued to perform the track in concert as late as 1977, citing it as one of his favorite songs.

In 1983, the song was released as a single in the UK to promote Motown's 18 Greatest Hits compilation album, on which the song was included. The album and single share cover artwork. Upon its release, "Happy" (credited to Michael Jackson plus The Jackson 5) peaked at #52 on the British pop chart.

== Charts ==
Chart performance for "Happy"
Chart (1973)	Peak position
Australia (Kent Music Report)	31
UK Singles (OCC)	52

== Bibliography ==
- Halstead, Craig and Chris Cadman (2003). Michael Jackson: The Solo Years. Authors OnLine. ISBN 0-7552-0091-8
- George, Nelson (2004). Michael Jackson: The Ultimate Collection booklet. Sony BMG.
