= One Day in Your Life (Michael Jackson song) =

- Side A of the 1975 UK single

Single by Michael Jackson

from the album Forever, Michael and One Day in Your Life
- B-side: "Dapper Dan"
- Released: 1975 (UK; original release) March 20, 1981 (US); April 21, 1981 (UK; re-release)
- Recorded: December 1974
- Genre: Pop; soul; R&B
- Length: 4:15
- Label: Motown
- Songwriters: Sam Brown III; Renée Armand
- Producer: Sam Brown III

Michael Jackson singles chronology
| "Just a Little Bit of You" (1975) | "One Day in Your Life" (1975) | "Ease On down the Road" (1978) |

Alternative cover
- 1981 UK reissue

"One Day in Your Life" is a song recorded by American singer Michael Jackson for his 1975 album, Forever, Michael. Written by Sam Brown III and Renée Armand, it was originally issued as a single in the UK in 1975 on Tamla Motown and later released in the US on March 20, 1981 as a single from the compilation album One Day in Your Life due to the commercial interest that generated from the sales of Jackson's hit 1979 album Off the Wall, despite the fact that Jackson had released that album on Epic Records instead of Motown.

While a modest US hit, it was a bigger hit in the UK, where it became Jackson's first solo recording to hit No. 1 on the UK Singles Chart. It was number one in the UK for two weeks in June and July 1981. It also topped the Irish Singles Chart, and also featured strongly on the South African singles charts. It went on to become the sixth best-selling single of 1981 in the UK. Robert Christgau called this song a romantic ballad that is as credible on its "own terms as the rockers." Five years prior, a cover version by Johnny Mathis for his Feelings album charted in the U.S. and Canada.

Record World said that "Plush strings cushion Michael's heavenly vocals."

== Charts ==
=== 1975 original release ===
| Chart (1976) | Peak position |
|---|---|
| Canada RPM Adult Contemporary | 46 |
| US Billboard Adult Contemporary | 36 |

=== 1981 re-release ===
==== Weekly charts ====
| Chart (1981–1982) | Peak position |
|---|---|
| Australia (Kent Music Report) | 9 |
| Belgium (Ultratop 50 Flanders) | 1 |
| Ireland (IRMA) | 1 |
| Netherlands (Dutch Top 40) | 1 |
| Netherlands (Single Top 100) | 2 |
| South Africa (Springbok) | 1 |
| UK Singles (Official Charts) | 1 |
| US Billboard Hot 100 | 55 |
| US Hot R&B/Hip-Hop Songs (Billboard) | 42 |
| US Adult Contemporary (Billboard) | 37 |

| Chart (2009) | Peak position |
|---|---|
| UK Singles (OCC) | 94 |

==== Year-end charts ====
| Chart (1981) | Position |
|---|---|
| Belgium (Ultratop Flanders) | 2 |
| Netherlands (Dutch Top 40) | 6 |
| Netherlands (Single Top 100) | 27 |

| Chart (1982) | Position |
|---|---|
| Australia (Kent Music Report) | 53 |

== Certifications ==
Michael Jackson version
| Region | Certification | Certified units/sales |
|---|---|---|
| United Kingdom (BPI) | Gold | 790,000 |
