= Music and Me (Michael Jackson song) =

Single by Michael Jackson

from the album Music & Me
- B-side: "Johnny Raven"
- Released: October 1973
- Recorded: March 1972
- Length: 2:38
- Label: Motown
- Songwriters: Jerry Marcellino; Mel Larson; Don Fenceton; Mike Cannon
- Producers: Mel Larson; Jerry Marcellino

Michael Jackson singles chronology
"Morning Glow" (1973)	"Music and Me" (1973)	"We're Almost There" (1975)

"Music and Me" is a 1973 single released by American singer Michael Jackson on the Motown label. It was the singer's second single release from his album of the same name. It reached number 29 in the Netherlands and number 49 in Turkey.

== Charts ==
Chart performance for "Music and Me"
Chart (1973)	Peak position
Netherlands (Single Top 100)	29
Turkey Singles Chart	49

== Other versions ==
- Brazilian countertenor, pop and jazz singer Edson Cordeiro covered the song on his 1999 album Disco Clubbing 2 – Mestre de Cerimônia.
- Regine Velasquez covered this song on her 1999 album R2K.
