= We're Almost There =

- 1975 US release

Single by Michael Jackson

from the album Forever, Michael
- B-side: "Take Me Back"
- Released: February 6, 1975 (original release); July 20, 1981 (re-release)
- Recorded: December 1974
- Length: 3:42
- Label: Motown
- Songwriters: Brian Holland; Edward Holland, Jr.
- Producer: Brian Holland

Michael Jackson singles chronology
"Music and Me" (1973)	"We're Almost There" (1975)	"Just a Little Bit of You" (1975)

Alternative cover
- 1981 re-release

"We're Almost There" is a 1975 song released as a single by American singer Michael Jackson, the first release from his final Motown album, Forever, Michael. It was also released as the second single in Europe from the 1981 compilation One Day in Your Life.

== Background ==
As Jackson's voice changed from a boy soprano to a tenor, Motown found it difficult to find material to suit the 16-year-old Jackson, who had sung in a higher voice for most of the duration of his Motown tenure, particularly between 1969 and 1972. With the return of the Holland brothers Brian and Edward, Motown had the duo write a collection of songs to fit Jackson's age.

== Reception ==
Cash Box said that "sweet strings soar high above a polished production as Michael Jackson's sugary vocal slides sexily along." Record World said that "it's the youthful Jackson's first single in almost two years, but well worth the wait."

== Personnel ==
- Lead and backing vocals by Michael Jackson
- Produced by Brian Holland

== Charts ==
The duo composed this song and the modest hit, "Just a Little Bit of You", which became a top forty hit after this single was released. Performing more modestly, the song eventually peaked at number 54 on the pop chart while hitting number 7 on the R&B chart. These two singles would end up being the last that Jackson would release as an active Motown artist, although the label continued to release Jackson singles up through 1984. The song was released as the second single from the 1981 compilation One Day in Your Life in the UK, France and Germany and reached number 46 in the UK following the chart-topping title track.

Weekly chart performance for "We're Almost There"
Chart (1975-1981)	Peak position
UK Singles (OCC)	46
US Billboard Hot 100	54
US Hot R&B/Hip-Hop Songs (Billboard)	7

2009 weekly chart performance for "We're Almost There"
Chart (2009)	Peak position
Italy (FIMI)	9

== Samples and covers ==
- The song was covered by Alicia Keys and featured on the bonus disc of the 'Empire Edition' of her 2009 album, The Element of Freedom.
- The song was later sampled on the 2010 hip-hop release "Our Dreams" on the Wu-Massacre album and on the 2009 hip-hop release "Almost There" on the Poindexter mixtape by Donald Glover.
