= John Branca =

American attorney (born 1950)

- Born: John Gregory Branca; December 11, 1950 (age 75); Bronxville, New York, US
- Education: Occidental College (BA); University of California, Los Angeles (JD)
- Occupation: Entertainment attorney
- Years active: 1975–present
- Children: 3
- Parents: John R. Branca (father); Barbara Werle (mother)

John Gregory Branca (born December 11, 1950) is an American entertainment attorney and manager who specializes in representing rock and roll acts. He has been the sole executor of the estate of Michael Jackson since 2009. He also serves as Chairman of The Michael Jackson Company. Branca has represented over 30 Rock and Roll Hall of Fame inductees including the Rolling Stones, Aerosmith, Bee Gees, The Beach Boys, and the Doors. Other recent representation includes Mike Curb, Curb Records, the Estate of Dean Martin, and Barry Gibb Bee Gees catalog. Non-music representation has included Mike Tyson, Richard Pryor and Eddie Murphy.

== Background ==
Branca was born in Bronxville, New York to Barbara May Theresa Werle (1928–2013), an entertainer and dancer who appeared on The Ed Sullivan Show and in several Elvis Presley films, and John Ralph Branca (1924–2010), an Air Force veteran, high school teacher and baseball coach who also held administrative positions for the city of Mount Vernon's recreational programs. The elder Branca was appointed Commissioner of the New York State Athletic Commission by Governor Mario Cuomo in 1983.

When Branca was 4, his parents split up, with his mother moving to Los Angeles for her career and Branca remaining in New York with his father until the age of 11. Branca is the nephew of Major League Baseball player Ralph Branca (1926–2016), starting pitcher for the Brooklyn Dodgers who played in the 1947 World Series. Ralph was close friends with teammate Jackie Robinson and is portrayed by Hamish Linklater in the film 42, a biopic about Robinson's life .

While in New York with his father, Branca was immersed in the game of baseball; however, upon his move to Los Angeles to live with his mother, Branca developed a passion for the guitar. By the age of 13, Branca had started a rock band, The Other Half, and by 16, his band Pasternak Progress secured an independent record deal and occasionally opened for the Doors at LA's Hullabaloo Club. Focused on being a musician, Branca was eventually expelled from boarding school. His mother's ultimatum to "get a job or go to college" convinced Branca to obtain his GED and to enroll in Los Angeles City College as a music major. Ahead of his junior year, he transferred to Occidental College and graduated cum laude with a degree in political science. Branca then attended UCLA School of Law, serving as editor-in-chief of one of the law reviews, and received his J.D. degree in 1975.

While working as an estate planner at the firm of Kindel & Anderson, Branca came across a Time profile of Elton John, which mentioned entertainment lawyers. Branca realized that this field of law was his true calling. One of Branca's early clients was Priscilla Presley.

In 2019, he was named "World's #1 Music Attorney" by Marquis Who's Who.

== Career highlights ==
=== Michael Jackson ===
Michael Jackson hired Branca as his attorney during a period when Frank DiLeo was serving as Jackson's manager.

Branca helped Jackson purchase ATV Music Publishing in 1985 for $47,500,000 (which held the copyrights to the Beatles' and Little Richard's songs). Within a few years, the catalog was worth more than $400,000,000. In 1990, Jackson terminated Branca's services due to perceived proximity to Walter Yetnikoff, the CEO of CBS Records, and a consultant to Sony Corp. Jackson also expressed concerns about Branca's representation of other artists such as the Rolling Stones and Aerosmith. Additionally, Branca requested a 5 percent interest in the Beatles catalog. Three years later, Jackson sought Branca's advice on merging his ATV catalog with Sony, resulting in Branca rejoining Jackson's team in exchange for a 5% share of the ATV catalog. In 1995, Branca proposed a merger of Sony's music publishing operations and ATV, resulting in Jackson becoming a significant owner of a larger company and receiving $150 million from Sony. Branca received 5 percent of this, amounting to $7.5 million.

In 2003, Jackson fired Branca based on a private investigation on behalf of him suggesting the flow of funds from Jackson through Sony Music CEO Tommy Mottola and Branca into offshore accounts in the Caribbean. In 2006, Jackson and Branca's relationship deteriorated further, leading Branca to resign due to conflicts between Jackson and Sony over Branca's 5 percent stake, which complicated Michael's financial situation. As part of the settlement, Branca sold back his stake for a substantial sum. Branca reached out to Randy Phillips expressing interest in rejoining Jackson's team shortly after Jackson concluded the press conference for This Is It in early March 2009. Frank DiLeo, Jackson's manager, acted as an intermediary between Branca and Jackson at the request of Randy Phillips. Branca was rehired by Jackson on June 17, 2009, eight days before the singer's death.

In the Michael Jackson probate case, Branca produced Jackson's final will and testament, which designated Branca as executor. The Jackson family filed a preemptive probate action in the Los Angeles Superior Court, based on the allegation that Jackson died "intestate", without a valid will. Branca filed the will in Los Angeles on July 1, 2009, and was appointed co-executor. After initially contesting the appointment of Branca and John McClain as executors of Michael's will, his mother Katherine withdrew her objections on November 10, 2009. According to the Associated Press, her attorney, Adam Streisand, said "Mrs. Jackson felt it was time legal fighting ended and that her actions were in the best interest of Michael's children." In an interview published in December 2010 she was quoted by the Los Angeles Times as saying that Branca and McClain are doing "a very good job" managing the estate.

Projects for the estate that Branca initiated include the concert film Michael Jackson's This Is It, of which Branca served as executive producer, and which is listed in the Guinness Book of World Records as the highest-grossing documentary film at the global box office; Cirque du Soleil's Immortal which toured from 2011 to 2014 and closed as the eighth-highest-grossing tour of all time; a second, permanent "Cirque" show, Michael Jackson: One at Mandalay Bay in Las Vegas, which opened in June 2013 and of which he is also a producer; a bestselling Ubisoft video game; a Spike Lee documentary, Bad 25, of which Branca also served as producer; the 2014 number one hit album Xscape; and the "Slave to the Rhythm" "holographic" Jackson performance featured at the Billboard Music Awards, the first of its kind. Additionally, Branca and the estate brought in Tony Award-winning director/choreographer Christopher Wheeldon and two-time Pulitzer Prize winner Lynn Nottage to create MJ the Musical, which opened in February 2022, and a 2026 feature film about Jackson's career produced by Bohemian Rhapsody (2018) producer Graham King which Branca hopes will become "the largest grossing, most acclaimed biopic in the history of Hollywood". Following its release, the Jackson biopic, directed by Antoine Fuqua, became the highest-grossing musical biopic in history, with global box office receipts exceeding $1 billion.In July, 2026, the 12th Annual National Film Awards UK awarded Jaafar Jackson its Outstanding Performance and Best Newcomer awards, and the Best Producer award to Graham King, John Branca, Prince Jackson and John McClain. In the film, Branca was portrayed by actor Miles Teller.

In 2019, following the release of Leaving Neverland which focuses on two men, Wade Robson and James Safechuck, who allege they were sexually abused as children by the singer, Branca and the rest of the estate condemned it as a "tabloid character assassination". The issues had caused them to file a $100 million lawsuit against HBO, petitioning the court to compel their arbitrate cooperation regarding the film's broadcast. As Jackson is dead, HBO cannot be sued for defamation. Instead, the estate claimed HBO had violated a 1992 agreement never to disparage Jackson's public image, stipulated in the terms for broadcasting his concert film Live in Bucharest: The Dangerous Tour. Eventually, the estate sued HBO for violating a non-disparagement clause in a 1992 contract by agreeing to run the documentary. The suit sought to compel HBO to litigate the issue in a public arbitration process and claimed that the estate could be awarded $100 million or more in damages. The suit accused HBO of fabricating lies with a financial motive. HBO did not stop the airing of the documentary on March 3. On September 19, Judge George Wu tentatively denied HBO's motion to dismiss the estate's lawsuit. Branca said HBO has been trying to suppress the other side of the story. "I've never seen a media organization fight so hard to keep a secret," Branca said. On the following day, Judge Wu gave a final ruling to deny HBO's motion to dismiss the case, granting the Jackson estate's motion to compel arbitration. On October 21, 2019, HBO filed a Notice of Appeal to the United States Court of Appeals for the Ninth Circuit seeking appellate review of the District Court's order, granting the Jackson estate's Motion to Compel Arbitration. The Ninth Circuit eventually affirmed the District Court's order in favor of the Jackson estate.

At the time of Jackson's death, the artist was reportedly $500 million in debt. By 2026, the estate had generated approximately $3 billion in assets.

CBS' 60 Minutes called it "The most remarkable and financial resurrection in pop culture history."

Michael Jackson estate co-executor John McClain died in May 2026, thus making Branca the sole executor to Jackson's estate.

=== Artist representation ===
In 1991, Branca put together what's considered rock's first mega-deal, a four-album deal for Aerosmith with Sony, estimated to be worth $50 million.

In 2005, Branca brokered a ground-breaking 360 deal between Korn and EMI, which made EMI a partner in all of Korn's operations. EMI earned a stake in all of Korn's touring and merchandise, instead of only handling the band's CDs, which has typically been the record company's role. A few months later, Branca, with his partner David Lande, expanded the circle to include concert promoter Live Nation. The duo has since put together Live Nation 360 deals for Shakira and Nickelback.

=== Music publishing ===
In 1985, Branca facilitated one of the most famous music publishing deals in history, the purchase of ATV Music Publishing for Michael Jackson.

In 2008, changes in the tax law that allowed songwriters to pay a smaller capital gains tax instead of a larger income tax prompted Branca to advise some of his clients that this was the perfect time to sell their music publishing catalogs, thereby establishing new precedents in valuation. Ensuing sales included: Kurt Cobain and Nirvana copyrights; Steven Tyler's Aerosmith publishing catalog of 160 songs to Primary Wave Music Publishing for $50 million; Julian Lennon's share of The Beatles' royalties, and the catalog of the legendary song-writing team of Leiber & Stoller to Sony/ATV, which created a new yardstick by which the worth of catalogs was measured. He also sold Berry Gordy's Jobete Music to EMI, which changed the method and standard by which catalogs were valued.

In 2009, Branca beat out Wall Street investment banking houses to represent the Rodgers & Hammerstein Organization and sold their catalog for an excess of $200 million, despite predictions by The Wall Street Journal and others that the catalog wouldn't fetch more than $150 million.

He also represented Sony Corporation of America in the $2.2 Billion acquisition of EMI Music Publishing and EMI and Sony/ATV in the sale of the Virgin Music catalog, making it the world's largest music publishing company.

In addition, Branca helped songwriters such as Don Henley of Eagles regain copyrights of their songs, or to help them secure royalties that they've lost, as he did with John Fogerty of Creedence Clearwater Revival.

== Personal life ==
At Branca's first wedding, Michael Jackson was best man and Little Richard served as minister. He has a daughter from his first marriage and two sons from his second marriage with Linda Branca. In 2019, Branca married for the third time to model and actress Jenna Hurt, but divorced in 2024. In 2025, Branca married Kristina Tuckute in Los Angeles.

== Public service ==
Branca helped Buddy Arnold form the Musicians Assistance Program, which later merged with MusiCares, which provides help to members of the music industry who need treatment for drug and alcohol addiction, as well as assistance for other financial, medical and personal crises. He currently serves as Chair Emeritus of MusiCares. For his support, the Grammy Foundation honored him with its 2012 Service Award. Additionally, he is on the Board of the Grammy Museum, the Board of Trustees of Occidental College and on the executive committee of UCLA's Pauley Pavilion Renovation Campaign Committee. Branca is a member of the Advisory Council for the Barack Obama Scholars Program at Occidental College.

Through his work on behalf of Jackson's Estate Branca has become outspoken advocate of protecting the deceased from defamation. At a June 2019, UCLA Law School panel titled “Truth Be Told? Documentary Films Today,” Branca stated: “The purpose of the First Amendment is supposedly getting at the truth, but the lack of defamation protection for an individual no longer living isn’t helpful in that regard. If copyright protection is life plus 75 years, there’s no reason a defamation suit shouldn’t be life plus 20, 30 or even 40 years.”

Branca is a Distinguished Alumni of Los Angeles City College. He also co-founded Club 42, an integrated youth baseball league honoring Jackie Robinson, a teammate and friend of Branca's uncle, Ralph, on the Brooklyn Dodgers, and Branca serves as a director of the Jackie Robinson Foundation.

In 2020, Branca was named to the Inaugural Board of Advisors for the Dean of the Herb Alpert School of Music at UCLA.

In 2024, New York University unveiled the 4,400-square-foot Branca Family Baseball Training Center funded by Branca. In an interview Branca said the on-campus facility was a tribute to his uncle Ralph, a member of the school's athletic Hall of Fame, and his father, who attended NYU on the GI Bill after World War II. Before the facility was built, NYU players, including Branca's youngest son Dylan, one of the team's pitchers, had to travel as far away as Brooklyn or Staten Island to practice. Dylan graduated from NYU in 2026.

In June 2024, Branca donated $5 million to Occidental College to establish the John Branca Institute for Music.
