= Sam Brown III =

American musician

Sam Brown III, usually known by his first and last name without the generational appellation, is an American songwriter, record producer, arranger and composer working in Los Angeles. He also hosts and produces radio programs about the business of entertainment and music on Los Angeles–based radio station KPFK FM.

== Advice programs and columns (Radio and Print) ==
- "Samm Brown's For the Record" weekly 1-hour radio program on KPFK FM, North Hollywood, California.

Archived...

- "Learn the Craft of Songwriting" in the Tolucan Times, a Toluca Lake, California newspaper.
