= Music & Me =

- Original 1973 cover (The 1990s CD release uses a different front.)

Studio album by Michael Jackson
- Released: April 13, 1973
- Recorded: March 1972 – January 1973
- Genres: Pop; R&B
- Length: 32:09
- Label: Motown
- Producers: Berry Gordy (exec.); Hal Davis; Freddie Perren; Fonce Mizell; Mel Larson; Jerry Marcellino; Bob Gaudio

Michael Jackson chronology
Ben (1972)	Music & Me (1973)	Forever, Michael (1975)

Singles from Music & Me
- 1. "With a Child's Heart" Released: May 5, 1973; 2. "Happy" Released: July 10, 1973; 3. "Morning Glow" Released: July 27, 1973; 4. "Music and Me" Released: October 1973; 5. "Doggin' Around" Released: 1974 (Netherlands); 6. "Too Young" Released: 1974 (Mexico and Venezuela)

Alternative cover
- Music & Me compilation cover

Music & Me is the third studio album by American singer Michael Jackson. It was released on April 13, 1973, by Motown. It was arranged by Dave Blumberg, Freddie Perren, Gene Page, and James Anthony Carmichael, and remains Jackson's lowest-selling album. In 2009, the album was reissued as part of the three-disc compilation Hello World: The Motown Solo Collection.

== Background ==
The album was released during a difficult period for Jackson, who was 14 years old at the time, as he had been experiencing vocal changes and facing a changing music landscape. Having been influenced by fellow Motown label mates Marvin Gaye and Stevie Wonder, Jackson wanted to include his own compositions and play instruments on the album, but Motown refused to allow this. Jackson would later express his frustrations about this to his father, Joe Jackson, who would later work to terminate Michael's and his brothers' contract with Motown, and negotiate lucrative contracts for them with Epic Records.

== Promotion ==
Since Jackson was on a world tour with his brothers as a member of The Jackson 5 (which ran from March 1973 to December 1975), promotion on this album was limited. The Stevie Wonder cover, "With a Child's Heart", was released as a single in the United States, where it reached number 14 on Billboard's Hot R&B/Hip-Hop Songs chart and number 50 on the Billboard Hot 100. Two additional songs, "Music and Me" and "Morning Glow," were released as singles in the United Kingdom, but failed to chart. Another track, "Too Young", was released as a single in Italy, while the track "Happy" was issued as a single in Australia and "Doggin' Around" received a limited-release single in the Netherlands. Ten years after this album's release, "Happy" was released as a single in the UK to promote Motown's 18 Greatest Hits compilation album.

== CD rerelease ==
Music & Me received some changes when Motown Records released it on compact disc in the 1990s, which occurred only outside of the U.S. A separate compilation with a similar title rerelease contained all tracks from the 1973 version (with the exception of "Doggin' Around"), with several more tracks from Jackson's other albums. The original CD also features different text and a darker shade of green.

== Critical reception ==
Professional ratings
Review scores
Source	Rating
AllMusic	3/5 stars
Entertainment Weekly	B
Village Voice	(B−)

The album received favorable reviews from music critics. However, Ron Wynn of AllMusic wrote that the album's songs "were undistinguished" and that "Jackson sounded tentative and uninterested vocally". He also wrote that "the production and arrangements were routine at best, sometimes inferior." In his review of the album for The Village Voice, Robert Christgau wrote that "Michael isn't the black Donny Osmond" since he has "a sense of natural rhythm, but he's a singer, not a marionette" but he ended saying that "if [Jackson is] a real interpreter" he does not "understand where the interpretations are coming from". Leah Greenblatt from Entertainment Weekly gave the album a B rating and noted: "On the cusp of a deepening, more adult voice, Jackson begins transitioning into grown-up material, including the contemplative title song, a grab bag of subdued show tunes, and a devastatingly fragile cover of Stevie Wonder's "With a Child's Heart"."

== Track listing ==
Side A
No.	Title	Writer(s)	Length
1.	"With a Child's Heart"	Sylvia Moy; Henry Cosby; Vicki Basemore	3:34
2.	"Up Again"	Freddie Perren; Christine Yarian	2:47
3.	"All the Things You Are"	Oscar Hammerstein II; Jerome Kern	2:55
4.	"Happy" (Love theme from Lady Sings the Blues)	Michel Legrand; Smokey Robinson	3:19
5.	"Too Young"	Sidney Lippman; Sylvia Dee	3:37

Side B
No.	Title	Writer(s)	Length
6.	"Doggin' Around"	Lena Agree	2:52
7.	"Euphoria"	Leon Ware; Jacqueline Hilliard	3:31
8.	"Morning Glow"	Stephen Schwartz	2:48
9.	"Johnny Raven"	Billy Page	3:36
10.	"Music and Me"	Jerry Marcellino; Mel Larson; Don Fenceton; Mike Cannon	2:35

Notes

- Johnny Raven was moved to Track 7 in later releases.

Music & Me CD rerelease track listing (compilation)
No.	Title	Writer(s)	Length
1.	"Rockin' Robin"	Jimmie Thomas	2:30
2.	"Johnny Raven"	Billy Page	3:31
3.	"Shoo-Be-Doo-Be-Doo-Da-Day"	Moy; Cosby; Stevie Wonder	3:19
4.	"Happy" (Love theme from Lady Sings the Blues)	Legrand; Robinson	3:19
5.	"Too Young"	Lippman; Dee	3:37
6.	"Up Again"	Perren; Yarian	2:47
7.	"With a Child's Heart"	Moy; Cosby; Basemore	3:34
8.	"Ain't No Sunshine"	Bill Withers	4:09
9.	"Euphoria"	Ware; Hilliard	2:48
10.	"Morning Glow"	Schwartz	3:36
11.	"Music and Me"	Marcellino; Larson; Fenceton; Cannon	2:35
12.	"All the Things You Are, Are Mine"	Hammerstein; Kern	2:55
13.	"Cinderella Stay Awhile"	Mack David; Michael Burnett Sutton	3:11
14.	"We've Got Forever"	David; Elliot Willensky	3:12
Total length:			45:12

== Charts ==
Weekly chart performance for Music & Me
Chart (1973)	Peak position
French Albums (SNEP)	108
US Billboard 200	92
US Top R&B/Hip-Hop Albums (Billboard)	24
US Cashbox Top Albums	38

== Sales ==
Sales for Music & Me
Region	Certification	Certified units/sales
United States	—	80,000
