= 24th Young Artist Awards =

2003 US media awards ceremony

- Official program
- Awarded for: Achievement in 2002 in film and television
- Date: March 29, 2003
- Site: Sportsmen's Lodge; Studio City, California
- Hosted by: America Ferrera and Sean Marquette

The 24th Young Artist Awards ceremony, presented by the Young Artist Association, honored excellence of young performers under the age of 21 in the fields of film, television, theater, music, and radio for the year 2002, and took place on March 29, 2003 at the Sportsmen's Lodge in Studio City, California.

Established in 1978 by long-standing Hollywood Foreign Press Association member, Maureen Dragone, the Young Artist Association was the first organization to establish an awards ceremony specifically set to recognize and award the contributions of performers under the age of 21 in the fields of film, television, theater and music.

== Categories ==
★ Bold indicates the winner in each category.

== Best Performance in a Feature Film ==
=== Best Performance in a Feature Film - Leading Young Actor ===
★ Tyler Hoechlin - Road to Perdition - DreamWorks/20th Century Fox

- Jamie Bell - Nicholas Nickleby - MGM/UA
- Rory Culkin - Signs - Buena Vista
- Nicholas Hoult - About A Boy - Universal/Studio Canal
- Lil' Bow Wow - Like Mike - 20th Century Fox
- Matthew O'Leary - Frailty - Lions Gate
- Mark Rendall - Touching Wild Horses - Animal Tales Productions

=== Best Performance in a Feature Film - Leading Young Actress ===
★ Alexa Vega - Spy Kids 2: The Island of Lost Dreams - Buena Vista

- Amanda Bynes - Big Fat Liar - Universal Pictures
- America Ferrera - Real Women Have Curves - Newmarket Films/HBO Films
- Kristen Stewart - Panic Room - Columbia Pictures
- Evan Rachel Wood - Little Secrets - Columbia Tristar/Samuel Goldwyn

=== Best Performance in a Feature Film - Supporting Young Actor ===
★ Marc Donato - White Oleander - Warner Brothers

- Liam Aiken - Road To Perdition - DreamWorks/20th Century Fox
- Emile Hirsch - The Emperor's Club - Universal Pictures
- Eric Lloyd - The Santa Clause 2 - Walt Disney Pictures
- Daniel Logan - Star Wars: Episode II – Attack of the Clones - 20th Century Fox
- Andrew Sandler - Minority Report - 20th Century Fox
- Dylan Smith - One Hour Photo - Fox Searchlight Pictures

=== Best Performance in a Feature Film - Supporting Young Actress ===
★ Eva Amurri - The Banger Sisters - Fox Searchlight Pictures

- Agnes Bruckner - Murder By Numbers - Warner Brothers
- Chea Courtney - Dragonfly - HBO Films
- Everlyn Sampi - Rabbit-Proof Fence - Miramax
- Erin Sanders - Never Never - Independent

=== Best Performance in a Feature Film - Young Actor Age Ten or Younger ===
★ Tyler Patrick Jones - Red Dragon - Universal Pictures

- Angus T. Jones - The Rookie - Walt Disney Pictures
- Dominic Scott Kay - Minority Report - 20th Century Fox
- Malcolm David Kelley - Antwone Fisher - Fox Searchlight Pictures
- Trung Hieu Nguyen - Green Dragon - Columbia Tristar

=== Best Performance in a Feature Film - Young Actress Age Ten or Younger ===
★ Caitlin EJ Meyer - Little Secrets - Columbia Tristar/Samuel Goldwyn

- Abigail Breslin - Signs - Buena Vista
- Emily Osment - Spy Kids 2: The Island of Lost Dreams - Buena Vista
- Tianna Sansbury - Rabbit-Proof Fence - Miramax
- Sophie Vavasseur - Evelyn - MGM/UA

== Best Performance in a TV Movie, Miniseries or Special ==
=== Best Performance In a TV Movie, Miniseries or Special - Leading Young Actor ===
★ Jeremy Sumpter - Just A Dream - Showtime

- Jon Foster - Murder in Greenwich - USA Network
- Jake Goldsbie - The Red Sneakers - Showtime
- Tyler Hynes - Tagged: The Jonathan Wamback Story - CTV
- Max Morrow - The Christmas Shoes - CBS
- Josh Zuckerman - I Was A Teenage Faust - Showtime

=== Best Performance in a TV Movie, Miniseries or Special - Leading Young Actress ===
★ Clara Bryant - Tru Confessions - Disney Channel

- Kimberly J. Brown - My Sister's Keeper - CBS
- Dakota Fanning - Taken - Sci-Fi Channel
- Jodelle Micah Ferland - The Christmas Child - CMT
- Maggie Grace - Murder in Greenwich - USA Network
- Sabrina Wiener - Gotta Kick It Up! - Disney Channel

=== Best Performance in a TV Movie, Miniseries or Special - Supporting Young Actor ===
★ Ryan Merriman - Taken - Sci-Fi Channel

- Brandon Hammond - Our America - Showtime
- Daniel Magder - Mom's On Strike - ABC
- Sean Marquette - Hidden Hills - NBC
- Roderick Pannell - Our America - Showtime
- Anton Yelchin - Taken - Sci-Fi Channel

=== Best Performance in a TV Movie, Miniseries or Special - Supporting Young Actress ===
★ Hallee Hirsh - My Sister's Keeper - CBS

- Jenna Boyd - Mary Christmas - PAX
- Holliston Coleman - Miss Lettie and Me - TNT
- Lindsay Felton - Anna's Dream - PAX
- Hannah Lochner - The Interrogation of Michael Crowe - Court TV

== Best Performance in a TV Series ==
=== Best Performance in A TV Series (Comedy or Drama) - Leading Young Actor ===
★ Gregory Smith - Everwood - WB

- Jake Epstein - Degrassi: The Next Generation - CTV
- Jonathan Malen - Screech Owls - YTV
- Frankie Muniz - Malcolm in the Middle - Fox TV
- Pablo Santos - Greetings from Tucson - WB
- Martin Spanjers - 8 Simple Rules - ABC
- Kyle Sullivan - All That - Nickelodeon

=== Best Performance in a TV Series (Comedy or Drama) - Leading Young Actress ===
★ Masiela Lusha - The George Lopez Show - ABC

- Kaley Cuoco - 8 Simple Rules - ABC
- Lisa Foiles - All That - Nickelodeon
- Christel Khalil - The Young and the Restless - CBS
- Renee Olstead - Still Standing - CBS
- Scarlett Pomers - Reba - WB
- Shadia Simmons - Strange Days at Blake Holsey High - NBC

=== Best Performance in a TV Series (Comedy or Drama) - Supporting Young Actor ===
★ Steven Anthony Lawrence - Even Stevens - Disney Channel

- Taylor Abrahamse - Doc - PAX
- Justin Berfield - Malcolm in the Middle - Fox TV
- Hector Escalante - American Family - PBS
- Mitch Holleman - Reba - WB
- Aaron Meeks - Soul Food - Showtime
- Max Morrow - Monk - ABC
- Jake Thomas - Lizzie McGuire - Disney Channel

=== Best Performance in a TV Series (Comedy or Drama) - Supporting Young Actress ===
★ Emily Hart - Sabrina the Teenage Witch - WB

- Katie Boland - The Zack Files - Fox Family
- Nicole Dicker - Screech Owls - YTV
- Lauren Frost - Even Stevens - Disney Channel
- Sara Paxton - Greetings from Tucson - WB
- Gigi Sumpter - Strong Medicine - Lifetime
- Emma Taylor-Isherwood - Strange Days at Blake Holsey High - NBC

=== Best Performance in a TV Series (Comedy or Drama) - Young Actor Age Ten or Younger ===
★ Dylan Cash - General Hospital - ABC

- Patrick Allen Dorn - The Bold and the Beautiful - CBS
- Luis Armand Garcia - The George Lopez Show - ABC
- Demetrius Joyette - Doc - PAX TV
- Austin Majors - N.Y.P.D. Blue - ABC
- Charlie Stewart - Life with Bonnie - ABC

=== Best Performance in a TV Series (Comedy or Drama) - Young Actress Age Ten or Younger ===
★ Sasha Pieterse - Family Affair - WB

- Kristen Alderson - One Life to Live - ABC
- Taylor Atelian - According to Jim - ABC
- Vivien Cardone - Everwood - WB
- Dee Dee Davis - The Bernie Mac Show - FOX
- Karle Warren - Judging Amy - CBS

=== Best Performance in a TV Drama Series - Guest Starring Young Actor ===
★ Alex Black - Charmed - WB

- Seth Adkins - CSI: Miami - CBS
- Raja Fenske - CSI: Miami - CBS
- Jason Fuchs - Law & Order: Special Victims Unit - NBC
- David Henrie - Without a Trace - CBS
- Myles Jeffrey - Touched by an Angel - CBS
- Cody McMains - Everwood - WB
- Kyle Saunders - Adventure Inc. - WB

=== Best Performance in a TV Drama Series - Guest Starring Young Actress ===
★ Sara Paxton - CSI: Crime Scene Investigation - CBS

- Ashley Edner - Judging Amy CBS
- Jamie Lauren - The Practice - ABC
- Joy Lauren - The Division - Lifetime
- Barbara Mamabolo - The Zack Files - Fox Family
- Melissa Mitchell - New Unsolved Mysteries - Lifetime
- Kay Panabaker - ER - NBC

=== Best Performance in a TV Comedy Series - Guest Starring Young Actor ===
★ Christopher Massey - The Parkers - UPN

- Robert Clark - Strange Days at Blake Holsey High - NBC
- Bobby Edner - Do Over - WB
- Steven Anthony Lawrence - Frasier - NBC
- Miles Marisco - Malcolm in the Middle - FOX

=== Best Performance in a TV Comedy Series - Guest Starring Young Actress ===
★ Amy Castle - Lizzie McGuire - Disney Channel

- Chelsea Brummer - What I Like About You - WB
- Lauren Storm - Malcolm in the Middle - FOX
- Marina Malota - My Wife and Kids - ABC
- Brenda Song - The Bernie Mac Show - FOX

=== Best Performance in a TV Comedy or Drama Series - Guest Starring Young Actor Age Ten or Younger ===
★ Gavin Fink - The X-Files - FOX

- Brett Buford - Everybody Loves Raymond - CBS
- Tyler Patrick Jones - Judging Amy - CBS
- Bobby Preston - Family Law - CBS

=== Best Performance in a TV Comedy or Drama Series - Guest Starring Young Actress Age Ten or Younger ===
★ Jessica Sara - My Wife and Kids - ABC

- Alexandra Hart Gilliams - Sabrina the Teenage Witch - WB
- Samantha Goldstein - Charmed - WB
- Alexandra Lee - Scrubs - NBC
- Abigail Mavity - Haunted - UPN
- Liliana Mumy - My Wife and Kids - ABC

=== Best Ensemble in a TV Series (Comedy or Drama) ===
★ Malcolm in the Middle - Fox

Frankie Muniz, Justin Berfield, Erik Per Sullivan, Kyle Sullivan, Craig Lamar Traylor

- American Dreams - NBC

Ethan Dampf, Vanessa Lengies, Sarah Ramos, Brittany Snow

- Degrassi: The Next Generation - CTV/Epitome Pictures

Sarah Barrable-Tishauer, Daniel Clark, Lauren Collins, Ryan Cooley, Jake Epstein, Stacey Farber, Jake Goldsbie, Aubrey Graham, Shane Kippel, Andrea Lewis, Miriam McDonald, Melissa McIntyre, Adamo Ruggiero, Christina Schmidt, Cassie Steele

- Family Affair - WB

Caitlin Wachs, Jimmy "Jax" Pinchak, Sasha Pieterse

- Lizzie McGuire - Disney Channel

Hilary Duff, Lalaine, Jake Thomas, Adam Lamberg

- My Wife and Kids - ABC

Parker McKenna Posey, Jennifer Nicole Freeman, George O. Gore II

== Best Performance in a Voice-Over Role ==
=== Best Performance in a Voice-Over Role ===
★ Thomas Dekker - The Land Before Time IX: Journey to Big Water - Universal

- Spencer Breslin - Return to Never Land - Disney
- Haley Joel Osment - The Hunchback of Notre Dame II - Disney
- Shawn Pyfrom - Stanley - Disney

=== Best Performance in a Voice-Over Role - Age Ten or Younger ===
★ Daveigh Chase - Lilo & Stitch - Disney

- Austin Majors - Treasure Planet - Disney
- Andrew McDonough - Return to Never Land - Disney

== Best Performance in a Commercial ==
=== Best Performance in a Commercial ===
★ Christian Roberts - 7 Up

- Cayden Boyd - McDonald's
- Dylan Cash - Fujifilm
- Jillian Clare - Children's Tylenol
- Jenna Morrison - Hallmark Permanent Wave

== Best Family Entertainment ==
=== Best Family Television Movie or Special ===
★ My Sister's Keeper - CBS

- The Christmas Shoes CBS
- Gotta Kick It Up! - Disney Channel
- Just a Dream - Showtime
- Miss Lettie and Me - TNT
- The Red Sneakers - Showtime

=== Best Family Television Series (Comedy or Drama) ===
★ The George Lopez Show - ABC

- The Bernie Mac Show - FOX
- Everwood - WB
- Family Affair - WB
- Lizzie McGuire - Disney Channel
- My Wife and Kids - ABC

=== Best Family Feature Film - Animation ===
★ Spirit: Stallion of the Cimarron - DreamWorks

- Ice Age - 20th Century Fox
- Lilo & Stitch - Walt Disney
- The Princess and the Pea - Visiplex Family Entertainment
- Spirited Away - Walt Disney
- The Wild Thornberrys Movie - Paramount Pictures

=== Best Family Feature Film - Comedy ===
★ The Crocodile Hunter: Collision Course - MGM/UA

- Big Fat Liar - Universal
- Like Mike - 20th Century Fox
- Little Secrets - Columbia Tristar/Samuel Goldwyn
- Maid in Manhattan - Columbia
- My Big Fat Greek Wedding - IFC Films

=== Best Family Feature Film - Drama ===
★ The Lord of the Rings: The Two Towers - New Line Cinema

- Antwone Fisher - Fox Searchlight
- The Emperor's Club - Universal
- Evelyn - MGM/UA
- Nicholas Nickleby - MGM/UA
- The Rookie - Walt Disney

=== Best Family Feature Film - Fantasy ===
★ Star Trek: Nemesis - Paramount

- Signs - Buena Vista
- Spider-Man - Columbia Tristar
- Spy Kids 2: The Island of Lost Dreams - Miramax
- Star Wars: Episode II – Attack of the Clones - 20th Century Fox
- Stuart Little 2 - Sony Pictures Entertainment

== Special awards ==
=== Best Young Performers in International Film ===
★ Yoo Seung-ho - The Way Home - Paramount Classics (South Korea)
★ Natalie Bjork - Alla älskar Alice (Everyone Loves Alice) - Nordisk Films (Sweden)

=== Best Young Ensemble in International Film ===
★ Kamchatka - Patagonik Film Group - Tomas Fonzi, Matias Del Pozo, Milton De La Canal (Argentina)

=== Best International Film ===
★ Zmeg (The Kite) – (Russia)

=== Best Young International Performer ===
★ Declan Galbraith - Declan - Xenex Music Group/Liberty EMI Records UK (United Kingdom)

=== Best Young Performers in a Theatre Production ===
★ Adam Wylie - For his role as "Jack" in the 2002 Broadway production of Into The Woods.
★ Tierra Abbott - For her role as the blind Helen Keller in the Curtis Theater of Brea, California production of The Miracle Worker.

=== Best Young Performer in a Radio Advertisement ===
★ Mackenzie Hannigan - For his portrayal of "Bobby Saunders", the "Get Smart" spokes-kid for "Smart & Final".

=== Young Artist Foundation Scholarship Award ===
★ Joseph Aaron

=== Former Child Star Life Achievement Award ===
★ Danny Bonaduce - For his role as "Danny Partridge" in the TV series The Partridge Family (1970–1974).
