= 22nd Young Artist Awards =

2001 US media awards ceremony

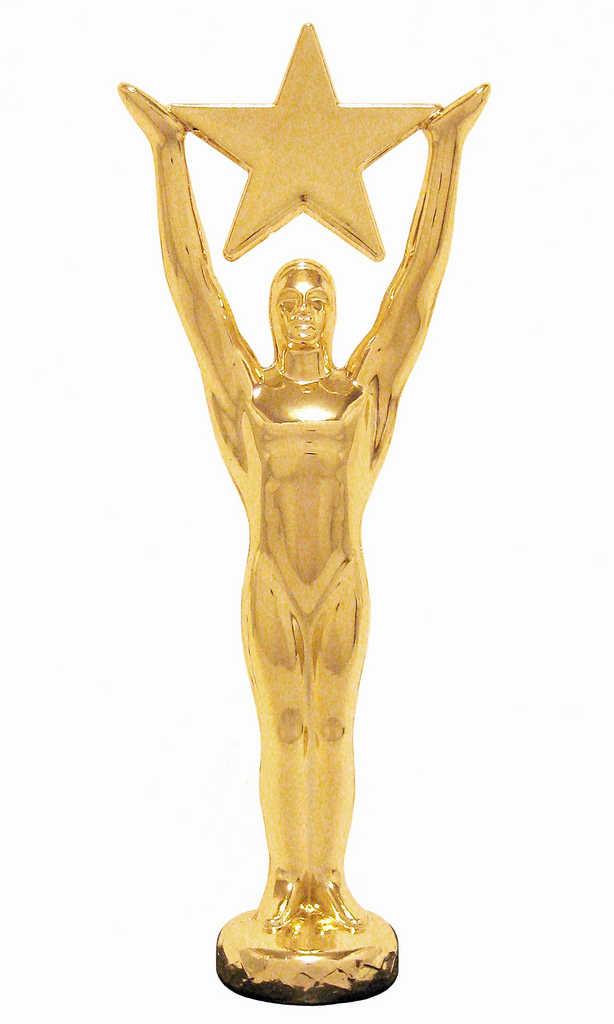
- Awarded for: Achievement in 2000 in film and television
- Date: April 1, 2001
- Site: Sportsmen's Lodge; Studio City, California
- Hosted by: Josh Keaton; Ryan Merriman; Kimberly Cullum; Cody McMains; Kaitlin Cullum; Adam Nicholson

The 22nd Young Artist Awards ceremony, presented by the Young Artist Association, honored excellence of young performers under the age of 21 in the fields of film and television for the year 2000, and took place on April 1, 2001, at the Sportsmen's Lodge in Studio City, California.

The announcer for the evening was William H. Bassett. The hosts for the evening were Josh Keaton, Ryan Merriman, Kimberly Cullum, Cody McMains, Kaitlin Cullum and Adam Nicholson.

Established in 1978 by long-standing Hollywood Foreign Press Association member, Maureen Dragone, the Young Artist Association was the first organization to establish an awards ceremony specifically set to recognize and award the contributions of performers under the age of 21 in the fields of film, television, theater and music.

== Categories ==
★ Bold indicates the winner in each category.

== Best Performance in a Feature Film ==
=== Best Performance in a Feature Film: Leading Young Actor ===
★ Rob Brown – Finding Forrester – Columbia Pictures

- Kevin Zegers – MVP: Most Valuable Primate – Keystone Family Pictures
- Haley Joel Osment – Pay It Forward – Warner Bros
- Ryan Merriman – Just Looking – Sony Pictures Classics
- Patrick Fugit – Almost Famous – DreamWorks SKG

=== Best Performance in a Feature Film: Leading Young Actress ===
★ Elizabeth Huett – Social Misfits – Our Way Productions

- Mara Wilson – Thomas and the Magic Railroad – Destination Films
- Jamie Renee Smith – MVP: Most Valuable Primate – Keystone Family Pictures
- Natalie Portman – Where the Heart Is – 20th Century Fox
- Kirsten Dunst – Bring It On – Universal

=== Best Performance in a Feature Film: Supporting Young Actor ===
★ Rory Culkin – You Can Count on Me – Paramount Classics

- Rollo Weeks – The Little Vampire – New Line
- J. Michael Moncrief – The Legend of Bagger Vance – DreamWorks SKG
- Spencer Treat Clark – Gladiator – Universal
- Lucas Black – All the Pretty Horses – Miramax

=== Best Performance in a Feature Film: Supporting Young Actress ===
★ Hayden Panettiere – Remember the Titans – Disney

- Caitlin Wachs – My Dog Skip – Warner Bros
- Ashley Johnson – What Women Want – Paramount
- Clara Bryant – The Lost Lover – Studio Canal Plus
- Thora Birch – Dungeons & Dragons – New Line Cinema

=== Best Performance in a Feature Film: Young Actor Age Ten or Under ===
★ Spencer Breslin – Disney's The Kid – Walt Disney

- Jake Thomas – The Cell – New Line Cinema
- Connor Matheus – Snow Day – Paramount
- Jonathan Lipnicki – The Little Vampire – New Line Cinema

=== Best Performance in a Feature Film: Young Actress Age Ten or Under ===
★ Makenzie Vega – The Family Man – Universal

- Taylor Momsen – Dr. Seuss' How the Grinch Stole Christmas – Universal
- Hallie Kate Eisenberg – Beautiful – Destination Films
- Holliston Coleman – Bless the Child – Paramount

== Best Performance in a TV Movie ==
=== Best Performance in a TV Movie (Drama): Leading Young Actor ===
★ Michael Schiffman – Finding Buck McHenry – Showtime

- Frankie Muniz – Miracle in Lane 2 – Disney Channel
- Jonathan Malen – Possessed – Showtime
- Aaron Meeks – A Storm in Summer – Showtime
- Bobby Edner – The Trial of Old Drum – Animal Planet
- Seth Adkins – When Andrew Came Home – Lifetime

=== Best Performance in a TV Movie (Drama): Leading Young Actress ===
★ Shadia Simmons – The Color of Friendship – Disney Channel

- Madeline Zima – The Sandy Bottom Orchestra – Showtime
- Alexa Vega – Run the Wild Fields – Showtime
- Kimberlee Peterson – Secret Cutting – USA Network
- Lindsey Haun – The Color of Friendship – Disney Channel
- Camilla Belle – Rip Girls – Disney Channel

=== Best Performance in a TV Movie (Drama): Supporting Young Actor ===
★ Patrick Levis – Miracle in Lane 2 – Disney Channel

- Kyle Schmid – The Sandy Bottom Orchestra – Showtime
- Addison Ridge – Frankie and Hazel – Showtime
- Cameron Finley – One True Love – CBS
- Vincent Berry – Baby – TNT

=== Best Performance in a TV Movie (Drama): Supporting Young Actress ===
★ Tamara Hope – The Sandy Bottom Orchestra – Showtime

- Ingrid Uribe – Frankie and Hazel – Showtime
- Courtney Peldon – The Princess and the Barrio Boy – Showtime
- Julia McIlvaine – The Lost Child – CBS/Hallmark
- Stacie Hess – Rip Girls – Disney Channel

=== Best Performance in a TV Movie (Comedy): Leading Young Actor ===
★ Andrew Lawrence – The Other Me – Disney Channel

- Bill Switzer – Mail to the Chief – Disney Channel
- Robert Ri'chard – Alley Cats Strike – Disney Channel
- Matthew O'Leary – Mom's Got a Date with a Vampire – Disney Channel
- Taylor Handley – Phantom of the Megaplex – Disney Channel

=== Best Performance in a TV Movie (Comedy): Leading Young Actress ===
★ Hallee Hirsh – The Ultimate Christmas Present – Disney Channel

- Laura Vandervoort – Mom's Got a Date with a Vampire – Disney Channel
- Tia & Tamera Mowry – Seventeen Again – Showtime
- Vanessa Lengies – Ratz – Showtime
- Kimberly J. Brown – Quints – Disney Channel

=== Best Performance in a TV Movie (Comedy): Supporting Young Actor ===
★ Tyler Hynes – The Other Me – Disney Channel

- Tahj Mowry – Seventeen Again – Showtime
- Max Morrow – Santa Who? – ABC/Wonderful World of Disney
- Jake Epstein – Quints – Disney Channel

=== Best Performance in a TV Movie (Comedy): Supporting Young Actress ===
★ Brenda Song – The Ultimate Christmas Present – Disney Channel

- Caitlin Wachs – Phantom of the Megaplex – Disney Channel
- Caroline Elliot – Ratz – Showtime
- Kaitlin Cullum – Growing Up Brady – NBC

=== Best Performance in a TV Movie (Comedy or Drama): Young Actor Age 10 or Under ===
★ Myles Jeffrey – Mom's Got a Date with a Vampire – Disney Channel

- Matt Weinberg – The Last Dance – CBS
- Sam Smith – Oliver Twist – PBS
- Jacob Smith – Phantom of the Megaplex – Disney Channel
- Stephen Joffe – The Wishing Tree – Showtime
- Spencer Breslin – The Ultimate Christmas Present – Disney Channel

=== Best Performance in a TV Movie (Comedy or Drama): Young Actress Age 10 or Under ===
★ Jodelle Ferland – Mermaid – Showtime

- Kaleigh Nevin – The Wishing Tree – Showtime
- Hallie Kate Eisenberg – The Miracle Worker – CBS/Wonderful World of Disney
- Arreale Davis – Up, Up and Away – Disney Channel
- Channing Carson – The Last Dance – CBS
- Charlotte Arnold – Custody of the Heart – Lifetime

== Best Performance in a TV Series ==
=== Best Performance in a TV Drama Series: Leading Young Actor ===
★ Robert Clark – The Zack Files – Fox Family

- Lee Thompson Young – The Famous Jett Jackson – Disney Channel
- Arjay Smith – The Journey of Allen Strange – Nickelodeon
- Jeremy Foley – Caitlin's Way – Nickelodeon

=== Best Performance in a TV Drama Series: Leading Young Actress ===
★ Alexis Bledel – Gilmore Girls – Warner Bros

- Lindsay Felton – Caitlin's Way – Nickelodeon
- Jessica Alba – Dark Angel – Fox

=== Best Performance in a TV Drama Series: Supporting Young Actor ===
★ Miko Hughes – Roswell – WB Network

- Robert Iler – The Sopranos – HBO
- Dan Byrd – Any Day Now – Lifetime
- Ryan Sommers Baum – The Famous Jett Jackson – Disney Channel
- Tony Barriere – Any Day Now – Lifetime
- Michael Angarano – Cover Me – USA Network Series

=== Best Performance in a TV Drama Series: Supporting Young Actress ===
★ Michelle Trachtenberg – Buffy the Vampire Slayer – WB

- Jamie-Lynn Sigler – The Sopranos – HBO
- Shari Dyon Perry – Any Day Now – Lifetime
- Mae Middleton – Any Day Now – Lifetime
- Olivia Friedman – Any Day Now – Lifetime
- Kerry Duff – The Famous Jett Jackson – Disney Channel

=== Best Performance in a TV Drama Series: Guest Starring Young Actor ===
★ Michal Suchanek – Mysterious Ways – PAX

- Andrew Sandler – Profiler – NBC
- Shawn Pyfrom – Touched By An Angel – CBS
- J.B. Gaynor – Family Law – CBS
- Andrew Ducote – Early Edition – Family Channel
- Trevor Blumas – Twice In a Lifetime – PAX

=== Best Performance in a TV Drama Series: Guest Starring Young Actress ===
★ Brooke Anne Smith – 7th Heaven – WB

- Ashley Michelle Tisdale – Boston Public – FOX
- Jamie Lauren – 7th Heaven – WB
- Elisabeth Moss – The West Wing – NBC
- Rachel David – Charmed – FOX

=== Best Performance in a TV Comedy Series: Leading Young Actor ===
★ Frankie Muniz – Malcolm in the Middle – Fox

- Robert Ri'chard – Cousin Skeeter – Nickelodeon
- Shia LaBeouf – Even Stevens – Disney

=== Best Performance in a TV Comedy Series: Leading Young Actress ===
★ Christy Carlson Romano – Even Stevens – Disney

- Mila Kunis – That '70s Show – Fox
- Amanda Bynes – The Amanda Show – Nickelodeon

=== Best Performance in a TV Comedy Series: Supporting Young Actor ===
★ Craig Lamar Traylor – Malcolm in the Middle – FOX

- Martin Spanjers – Daddio – NBC
- Dee Jay Daniels – The Hughleys – UPN
- John Francis Daley – The Geena Davis Show – ABC

=== Best Performance in a TV Comedy Series: Supporting Young Actress ===
★ Cristina Kernan – Daddio – NBC

- Brianne Prather – The Jersey – Disney Channel
- Ashley Monique Clark – The Hughleys – UPN

=== Best Performance in a TV Comedy Series: Guest Starring Young Performer ===
★ Joey Zimmerman – Becker – CBS

- Jenna Rose Morrison – The Amanda Show – Nickelodeon
- Miles Marisco – The Jersey – Disney Channel
- Ty Hodges – Even Stevens – Disney Channel
- Ashley Edner – Malcolm in the Middle – FOX

=== Best Performance in a TV Series (Comedy or Drama): Young Actor Age Ten or Under ===
★ Alvin Alvarez – The Brothers Garcia – Nickelodeon

- Erik Per Sullivan – Malcolm in the Middle – FOX
- Mitch Holleman – Daddio – NBC

=== Best Performance in a TV Series (Comedy or Drama): Young Actress Age Ten or Under ===
★ Karle Warren – Judging Amy – CBS

- Makenzie Vega – The Geena Davis Show – ABC
- Madylin Sweeten – Everybody Loves Raymond – CBS

== Best Performance in a Daytime TV Series ==
=== Best Performance in a Daytime TV Series: Young Actor ===
★ Jesse McCartney – All My Children – ABC

- Justin Torkildsen – The Bold and the Beautiful – CBS
- Logan O'Brien – General Hospital – ABC
- Billy Kay – Guiding Light – CBS
- Penn Badgley – The Young and the Restless – NBC

=== Best Performance in a Daytime TV Series: Young Actress ===
★ Brittany Snow – Guiding Light – CBS

- Mary Elizabeth Winstead – Passions – NBC
- Kirsten Storms – Days of Our Lives – NBC
- Jennifer Finnigan – The Bold and the Beautiful – CBS
- Ashley Lyn Cafagna – The Bold and the Beautiful – CBS

== Best Performance in a Voice-Over ==
=== Best Performance in a Voice-Over (TV / Film / Video): Young Actor ===
★ Thomas Dekker – An American Tail: The Mystery of the Night Monster – Universal Pictures Home Video

- Spencer Klein – Hey Arnold! – Nickelodeon
- Marc Donato – Animal Shelf – Fox Family
- Rickey D'Shon Collins – Recess – ABC
- Joseph Ashton – Rocket Power – Nickelodeon

=== Best Performance in a Voice-Over (TV / Film / Video): Young Actress ===
★ Emily Hart – Sabrina: The Animated Series – UPN

- Francesca Marie Smith – Hey Arnold! – Nickelodeon
- Olivia Hack – Hey Arnold! – ABC
- Kristin Fairlie – Little Bear – Nickelodeon
- Tanya Donato – Sailor Moon – Cartoon Network

== Best Ensemble Performance ==
=== Best Ensemble in a TV Series (Drama or Comedy) ===
★ Once and Again – ABC

Evan Rachel Wood, Julia Whelan and Meredith Deane

- So Weird – Disney Channel

Eric Lively, Erik von Detten, Patrick Levis and Alexz Johnson

- Malcolm in the Middle – Fox

Frankie Muniz, Justin Berfield, Erik Per Sullivan, Craig Lamar Traylor and Christopher Masterson

- The Jersey – Disney Channel

Michael Galeota, Courtnee Draper, Theo Greenly and Jermaine Williams

- The Brothers Garcia – Nickelodeon

Alvin Alvarez, Bobby Gonzalez, Jeffrey Licon and Vaneza Leza Pitynski

=== Best Ensemble in a TV Movie ===
★ Finding Buck McHenry – Showtime

Michael Schiffman, Megan Bower, Duane McLaughlin, Marcello Meleca

- The Other Me – Disney Channel

Andrew Lawrence, Brenden Jefferson, Tyler Hynes, Sarah Gadon, Alison Pill

=== Best Ensemble in a Feature Film ===
★ My Dog Skip – Warner Bros

Frankie Muniz, Cody Linley, Bradley Coryell, Daylan Honeycutt, Caitlin Wachs

- The Patriot – Columbia Pictures

Gregory Smith, Trevor Morgan, Skye McCole Bartusiak, Logan Lerman, Bryan Chafin, Mika Boorem

== Best Family Entertainment ==
=== Best Family TV Movie / Pilot / Mini-series: Cable ===
★ A Storm in Summer – Showtime

- The Wishing Tree – Showtime
- Seventeen Again – Showtime
- Run the Wild Fields – Showtime
- Mom's Got a Date with a Vampire – Disney Channel
- Miracle in Lane 2 – Disney Channel
- The Color of Friendship – Disney Channel

=== Best Family TV Movie / Pilot / Mini-series: Network ===
★ Papa's Angels – CBS

- Yesterday's Children – CBS
- To Brave Alaska – ABC
- Second Honeymoon – CBS
- Santa Who? – ABC
- The Growing Pains Movie – ABC
- Cupid & Cate – CBS/Hallmark
- Baby – TNT

=== Best Educational TV Show or Series ===
★ Walking with Dinosaurs – Discovery Channel

- Nature – PBS
- Lon Chaney: A Thousand Faces – TCM
- Founding Fathers – History Channel
- The Children of the Charbannes – HBO
- Awesome Pawsome – Animal Planet

=== Best Family TV Drama Series ===
★ Gilmore Girls – WB

- Touched by an Angel – CBS
- 7th Heaven – WB
- Mysterious Ways – NBC
- Judging Amy – CBS
- The Famous Jett Jackson – Disney Channel

=== Best Family TV Comedy Series ===
★ The Brothers Garcia – Nickelodeon

- The Jersey – Disney Channel
- The Hughleys – UPN
- Everybody Loves Raymond – CBS
- Even Stevens – Disney Channel
- Ed – NBC

=== Best Animated TV Series ===
★ Sabrina: The Animated Series – ABC

- Sheep in the Big City – Cartoon Network
- Rolie Polie Olie – Disney Channel
- Blue's Clues – Nickelodeon
- Bear in the Big Blue House – Disney Channel
- Angela Anaconda – Family Channel

=== Best Family Feature Film – Drama ===
★ My Dog Skip – Warner Bros

- Remember the Titans – Disney
- Finding Forrester – Columbia Pictures
- Family Tree – Warner Vision
- The Family Man – Universal

=== Best Family Feature Film – Comedy ===
★ Dr. Seuss' How the Grinch Stole Christmas – Universal

- Snow Day – Paramount
- Return to Me – MGM
- The Flintstones in Viva Rock Vegas – Universal
- Disney's The Kid – Walt Disney

=== Best Family Feature Film – Animation ===
★ Chicken Run – DreamWorks

- Rugrats in Paris: The Movie – Paramount
- The Emperor's New Groove – Walt Disney
- Dinosaur – Buena Vista
- Blue's Big Musical Movie – Paramount

== Special awards ==
=== Best Young Actor in an International Film ===
★ Jamie Bell – Billy Elliot (United Kingdom) – Produced by Working Title Films, distributed by Universal Focus

=== Best Young Actress in an International Film ===
★ Zhang Ziyi – Crouching Tiger, Hidden Dragon (China) – Distributed by Sony Pictures Classics

=== Best International Family Film ===
★ Billy Elliot – Produced by Working Title Films, distributed by Universal Focus

=== Best Short Foreign Film ===
★ Sanzhyra – Russian Kinoglaz Company – Producer: Yevgeniya Tirdatova

=== Outstanding Young International Performer ===
★ Michael Junior (Belgium) – PBS Special: Michael Junior – CD: Dreamland

=== Outstanding Young Female Entertainer ===
★ Lauren Frost – Barbra Streisand concert – Madison Square Garden

=== Outstanding Young Performer in Live Theater ===
★ Tiffany Solano

=== Former Child Star Life Achievement Award ===
★ Jay Underwood – The Boy Who Could Fly

=== Former Child Star Life Achievement Award ===
★ Charlene Tilton – Dallas

=== Outstanding Young Performers in a National Commercial Featuring Youth ===
★ Daniel Smorgon (Actor) – Bank of America
★ Sam Schwarz (Voice Over) – Bank of America – Produced by Bozell Advertising, New York

=== Outstanding Young Actress in a National Television Commercial ===
★ Steffani Brass – Disney Cruise Line

=== Outstanding Achievement in an International Commercial Featuring Youth ===
★ Nes Bitton (Israel) Diver/Actor – 'Diver' – Cheltenham & Gloucester, UK
★ Nimrod Mashiach (Israel) Diver/Actor – 'Diver' – Cheltenham & Gloucester, UK – Produced by Saatchi & Saatchi, London
