= Rip Girls =

2000 Disney Channel Original Movie

- Promotional advertisement
- Written by: Jeanne Rosenberg
- Directed by: Joyce Chopra
- Starring: Camilla Belle; Dwier Brown
- Music by: Phil Marshall
- Country of origin: United States
- Original language: English

Production
- Producer: Steve McGlothen
- Cinematography: David Eggby
- Editor: Paul LaMastra
- Running time: 87 minutes

Original release
- Network: Disney Channel
- Release: April 22, 2000

Rip Girls is a 2000 family drama Disney Channel Original Movie (DCOM), directed by Joyce Chopra and starring Camilla Belle as a teenage girl named Sydney. The film's plot follows Sydney, her father and his wife, stepmom Elizabeth, who come to an island on Hawaii, where they find a closer relationship to each other while struggling with ideas of changes to the island. During her time on the island, Sydney makes new friends and learns the truth about her deceased mother. The film premiered on Disney Channel on April 22, 2000.

== Plot ==
Sydney Miller is a 13-year-old girl who was born in Hawaii and moved away at a young age after the death of her mother, whom she barely remembers. From her great-aunt, Sydney inherits a derelict Hawaiian plantation that had been used through five generations. Sydney, her father Ben, and her stepmother Elizabeth leave their residence in Chicago to visit the plantation, known as Makai. When the Millers arrive, they meet attorney Bo Kauihou, who informs them that Sydney will inherit the plantation if she stays there for two weeks. Bo attempts to dissuade Sydney's parents from selling the plantation, stating that the ground is still fertile enough for use as farm land, although Ben is hesitant as he and Elizabeth have no farm experience. Although Bo wants to preserve the plantation, he informs the Millers that there have been inquiries about purchasing the property.

At the plantation, Sydney finds an old photograph of her mother and learns that she used to surf. The next day, Sydney finds a surfboard with the word "Naniloa" inscribed on it in a nearby abandoned barn, then befriends a girl named Gia, who enjoys surfing. That night, Sydney tells her parents that she wants to spend time with Gia at a beach on the following day. Ben is apprehensive about Sydney going to the beach alone, but allows her to do so when she promises to just take pictures, without going near the water. While Ben, Elizabeth, and Bo meet with realtors, Sydney arrives at the beach with the Naniloa surfboard. Sydney is introduced to Gia's friends, including Kona, a boy who is an artist and skateboarder. Sydney confesses that she does not know how to surf, so Gia teaches her.

Later, Bo and the Millers meet with the realtors to discuss a company's plans to construct a resort on the plantation property. Sydney is disappointed that the plans do not include the preservation of the plantation buildings, which were built in 1912; the realtors suggest that the main plantation house could be converted into a restaurant. They also tell Sydney that everything is negotiable after she expresses disappointment at the company's plan to make the nearby beach available to hotel guests only.

While surfing, Sydney is swept off her surfboard and rescued by Kona. Sydney gets a cut on her face and later awakens in a beach house belonging to Gia's mother, Malia, who has bandaged her cut. Malia tells Sydney that the Naniloa surfboard belonged to Sydney's mother, who was nicknamed Naniloa. Malia also says that she was friends with Sydney's mother. Malia is surprised to learn that Ben never mentioned the friendship. Malia then takes Sydney to a lagoon to observe its beauty; Malia tells her that it is a place where whales gather annually. Malia brings Sydney back to the plantation, and Ben becomes upset at Malia, believing that she encouraged Sydney to surf. When Malia questions Ben's decision to withhold information from Sydney regarding her mother, he argues that he was trying to keep Sydney away from Hawaii and surfing in order to protect her, an idea with which Malia disagrees.

The next day, Sydney learns from Gia that her mother had died in an accident. Sydney says her father has never discussed her mother's death and she has never asked him about it. Sydney has Kona and Gia take her to Kaala Loa, a vacant plantation, where she discovers her mother's old bedroom. The Millers receive a new monetary offer for Makai, and Sydney is left to choose whether to accept it. That night, a party is held at Kaala Loa, where Sydney and Kona share a kiss. While observing the whales, Sydney learns from Malia that her mother died while surfing. Though iniatially upset with her mother for not being around and with Ben for keeping the truth from her, Sydney reconciles with her dad, who encourages her to do the right thing.

Gia's friends ignore Sydney after a newspaper article states that the plantation and beach will be sold to the company, even though she has not yet made a decision. When Sydney tells Gia that the company has promised to preserve the lagoon for the whales, Gia tells her that the animals will no longer arrive with tourists around. Gia admits that initially, she only befriended Sydney so she could convince her to keep the plantation and beach, but claims that their friendship has become genuine, which Sydney does not believe. They argue, and Sydney decides to sell the property. When Sydney is ready to sign the paperwork, however, she notices Gia's friends outside and decides not to sell, choosing instead to live at Makai. Sydney returns to the beach to tell Gia the good news, but sees her surfboard floating alone in the tide and realizes Gia is caught in a rip current. Sydney rescues Gia and the two girls reconcile.

== Cast ==
- Camilla Belle as Sydney Miller
- Dwier Brown as Ben Miller
- Stacie Hess as Gia
- Brian Stark as Kona
- Jeanne Mori as Malia
- Lauren Sinclair as Elizabeth Miller
- Keone Young as Bo
- Kanoa Chung as Kai
- Meleana White as Mele
- Joy Magelssen as Lanea
- Varoa Tiki as Hawaiian Grandmother
- Rory Togo as Willie
- Albert Belz as James
- Jane Hall as Arlene

== Production ==
Rip Girls was filmed in Queensland, Australia.

== Reception ==
Mike Hughes of Gannett News Service considered Rip Girls a "first-rate film using unknown actors," writing, "Many of the Disney Channel movies tend to be brightly empty. This one, however, offers both a pretty exterior and a solid core." Tim Ryan of the Honolulu Star-Bulletin considered the film to be unrealistic. In June 2011, Stephan Lee of Entertainment Weekly wrote "it's a lot simpler than I remembered, and the performances are charmingly unpolished, but it's still one of my favorites." In 2012, Tara Aquino of Complex ranked the film at number 12 on the magazine's list of the 25 best Disney Channel Original Movies.

In December 2015, Jonathon Dornbush of Entertainment Weekly ranked Rip Girls at number 29 on a list of the top 30 Disney Channel Original Movies, writing that it feels like a "lesser combination" of earlier DCOMs Brink! and Johnny Tsunami: "The movie has its moments, with a young Camilla Belle at the center, but it ends up as a forgettable though still enjoyable mishmash of the DCOM sports genre without staking a claim for itself." In May 2016, Aubrey Page of Collider ranked each DCOM released up to that point. Page ranked Rip Girls at number 54 and wrote, "This one is certainly less than the sum of its parts, but it has a pretty solid teeny-bopper beach playlist that still holds up today."

== Awards ==
In 2001, Camilla Belle and Stacie Hess received nominations at the 22nd Young Artist Awards, for Best Performance in a TV Movie (Drama), Leading Young Actress and Supporting Young Actress, respectively.
