= Center of the Universe (TV series) =

- Genre: Sitcom
- Created by: Nat Bernstein; Mitchel Katlin
- Starring: John Goodman; Jean Smart; Spencer Breslin; Olympia Dukakis
- Composer: Rick Marotta
- Country of origin: United States
- Original language: English
- No. of seasons: 1
- No. of episodes: 15 (5 unaired)

Production
- Executive producers: Nat Bernstein; Mitchel Katlin; Eric Tannenbaum; Kim Tannenbaum; Alan Kirschenbaum; Andy Ackerman; John Goodman
- Producer: Bari Halle
- Running time: 30 minutes
- Production companies: Katlin/Bernstein Productions; The Tannenbaum Company; CBS Productions; Warner Bros. Television

Original release
- Network: CBS
- Release: October 27, 2004 – January 19, 2005

Center of the Universe is an American sitcom television series created by Nat Bernstein and Mitchel Katlin, that aired on CBS from October 27, 2004 until January 19, 2005. The show was cancelled after 10 episodes aired. It was set in downtown Tulsa, Oklahoma.

John Goodman starred as John Barnett, a good-natured and successful operator of a security company. Spencer Breslin plays his nutty, nerdy 12-year-old son. The series involved the dependency of his entire family (except his wife, but including his parents) on John for everything—money, jobs, housing, and personal guidance in every decision.

Tagline: "The world doesn't revolve around John...but his family does."

A total of 15 episodes were produced.

== Cast ==
- John Goodman as John Barnett
- Jean Smart as Kate Barnett
- Spencer Breslin as Miles Barnett
- Olympia Dukakis as Marge Barnett
- Diedrich Bader as Tommy Barnett
- Melinda McGraw as Lily Barnett
- Ed Asner as Art Barnett

== Episodes ==
No.	Title	Directed by	Written by	Original release date	Prod. code	Viewers (millions)
1	"Pilot"	Andy Ackerman	Mitchel Katlin & Nat Bernstein	October 27, 2004	475260	6.8
2	"The Lake House"	Terry Hughes	Bruce Rasmussen	November 3, 2004	2T5503	6.3
3	"Alarmed and Dangerous"	Mark Cendrowski	Eric Zicklin	November 10, 2004	2T5508	7.1
4	"Good Parent, Bad Parent"	Terry Hughes	Bruce Rasmussen	November 24, 2004	2T5509	5.3
5	"Art's Heart"	Andy Ackerman	Brett Baer & Dave Finkel	December 1, 2004	2T5505	6.5
6	"And the Silver Metal Goes to..."	Mark Cendrowski	Bruce Rasmussen & Eric Zicklin	December 8, 2004	2T5511	5.7
7	"Lily's Boyfriend"	Mark Cendrowski	Alan Kirschenbaum	December 15, 2004	2T5507	9.2
8	"The Work of Art"	Andy Ackerman	Eric Zicklin	January 5, 2005	2T5502	6.1
9	"If You Love Something Leave It Alone"	Andy Ackerman	Bruce Rasmussen	January 12, 2005	2T5501	5.9
10	"The New Neighbors"	Terry Hughes	Story by : Shira Zeltzer; Teleplay by : Billy Van Zandt & Jane Milmore	January 19, 2005	2T5513	6.2
11	"It's the Principal of the Thing"	Mark Cendrowski	Shira Zeltzer	Unaired	2T5504	N/A
12	"Oh, Brother, What the Hell Were You Thinking?"	Chris Brougham	Mitchel Katlin & Nat Bernstein	Unaired	2T5506	N/A
13	"The Break In"	Barnet Kellman	Brett Baer & Dave Finkel	Unaired	2T5510	N/A
14	"Marathon Woman"	Mark Cendrowski	Story by : Alan Kirschenbaum; Teleplay by : Nat Bernstein & Mitchel Katlin	Unaired	2T5512	N/A
15	"Independence Day"	Mark Cendrowski	Bruce Rasmussen & Eric Zicklin	Unaired	2T5514	N/A
