= Harold (film) =

2008 American comedy film directed by T. Sean Shannon

- Theatrical release poster
- Directed by: T. Sean Shannon
- Written by: Greg Fields; T. Sean Shannon
- Produced by: Cuba Gooding Jr.; Morris S. Levy
- Starring: Spencer Breslin; Nikki Blonsky; Ally Sheedy; Cuba Gooding Jr.
- Cinematography: Christopher LaVasseur
- Edited by: Colleen Sharp
- Production companies: Blue Star Pictures; City Lights Pictures; M.E.G.A. Films
- Distributed by: City Lights Pictures
- Release date: July 11, 2008
- Running time: 105 minutes
- Country: United States
- Language: English
- Budget: $3.5 million
- Box office: $13,229

Harold is a 2008 American comedy film co-written by Greg Fields and T. Sean Shannon, starring Spencer Breslin in the title role, Cuba Gooding Jr., Nikki Blonsky, Ally Sheedy and Stella Maeve. It is Shannon's first full-length feature film and is partially adapted from his earlier short film, which itself was adapted from one of his Saturday Night Live sketches. It was also released six years after the death of Greg Fields.

Harold was filmed in August 2007 in and around Great Neck, Long Island, New York, and received a limited release on July 11, 2008, in Los Angeles, Miami, and New York City.

== Plot ==
Harold Clemens is a 16-year-old boy with early male pattern baldness. He copes all right in his hometown of Douglas, until his mom, Maureen, announces that the family is moving to a new house in Fredericksburg due to a promotion at her job.

When he arrives in his new house, Harold is met by an elderly neighbor, Maude, who assumes Harold is older because of his baldness and flirts with him. Harold starts at his new school, and because he initially wears a hat, he is seemingly accepted, especially by a girl, Evelyn, whom he briefly flirts with. When the teacher notices him wearing a hat, he is forced to take it off, revealing that he is bald. Instantly he is ostracized by the other students, including Evelyn, and especially the school bullies—including the ringleader, Brad Denison.

Harold sees that some of the students ride go-karts to school, including Brad, and he asks his mother for one for his birthday; however, he instead receives a battery—powered riding cart like the kind that elderly people ride.

Harold's older sister, Shelley, has started high school in the new town as an immensely popular and flirty cheerleader. She meets a boy named Patrick and they start dating, which leads to Patrick assuming that Harold is Shelley's father. Harold initially uses this to prank Patrick, but Shelley reveals the truth. At first Patrick and his friends are mad, but Harold makes up for it by buying the boys some beer.

Harold is bullied relentlessly by students. One of the few nice people is Cromer Styles, the school janitor. Harold decides to go back to his old home, where everyone liked him. He only makes it as far as a strip bar. Harold thinks that because he looks older, he may pass for legal age, but Cromer is there and takes Harold home.

Harold (Spencer Breslin)

Patrick and his buddies ask Harold to get them some beer for a party. Harold agrees, but only if they allow him to join them at the party. He buys the beer, but while chatting with the boys at the party he is arrested and locked up. Cromer bails him out and drops Harold off at home.

Patrick apologizes to Shelley for what happened and woos her by saying he is falling in love with her, but he secretly has a bet with his friends about whether he can get Shelley to have sex with him before the school dance. Patrick threatens to take another girl to the motel room he's booked if she doesn't go with him. Harold finds Shelley crying, and she tells him the truth. Harold decides to get revenge. Shelley tells Patrick she has decided to go with him to the motel; they arrive there at night with Harold and Cromer waiting in the shadows. While Patrick is off to get sodas for them, Cromer helps Shelley out a back window, and when Patrick returns, the lights are off, and he has no idea that they have replaced Shelley with Maude. Patrick ends up having sex with her, then runs out screaming when she turns on the lights and reveals herself.

Brad and his crew write Harold a fake note from Evelyn, asking him out to the dance, and then they humiliate him when he shows up. Harold walks out in a funk and snaps at Rhonda, a classmate who genuinely likes him, when she tries to talk to him.

There is a go-kart race coming up, and Cromer decides that Harold should enter. The bullies have also entered. Brad, close to winning, puts a dent in Harold's cart to slow him. Rhonda, seeing this, bashes Brad's cart, causing him to crash. Harold pulls ahead of most of the contestants except for Brad's friends. A lady from the crowd, who happens to be a stripper at the bar Harold went to, shows her breasts to the bullies in order to distract them, enabling Harold to win the race and the respect of the school. Harold receives a trophy, the coach congratulates him, and one of Brad's friends apologizes to him.

Maude meets one of the men cheering Harold on, who turns out to be Reedy, one of the regulars at the strip bar, and the two become enamored with each other. Harold says hi to a few neighbors along the way to Rhonda's house, where he greets her to take her out for a walk.

== Cast ==
- Spencer Breslin as Harold Clemens
- Cuba Gooding Jr. as Cromer Styles
- Nikki Blonsky as Rhonda Baxter
- Ally Sheedy as Maureen Clemens
- Stella Maeve as Shelly Clemens
- Suzanne Shepherd as Maude Sellers
- Fred Willard as Dr. Richard Pratt
- Rachel Dratch as Ms. Norris
- Chris Parnell as Coach Vanderpool
- Elizabeth Gillies as Evelyn Taylor
- Dave Attell as Barker
- Daniel Farcher (credited as Dan "Dietz" Farcher) as Brad Denison
- Wass Stevens as Buck
- Derek Nelson as Mason
- Robert Gorrie as Patrick
- Dylan Snyder as Dylan
- Alan Aisenberg as Malcolm
- Paul Thornton as Mr. Kahane
- Angel Sing as Chang
- Colin Quinn as Reedy
- Nicky Katt as Police Officer #1
- Lathan Mckay as Officer Shannon
- Nicola Peltz as Becki

== Reception ==
Harold received negative reviews from critics. On Rotten Tomatoes, it holds an approval rating of 31% based on 16 reviews, with an average rating of 4.1/10. On Metacritic, the film has a weighted average score of 10%, based on reviews from five critics, indicating "overwhelming dislike".

Robert Abele from the Los Angeles Times criticized Shannon for following the "three-minute-idea mind-set" of Saturday Night Live when directing his script that's filled with humorless high school ridicule, "fogey-dom signposts", and elderly women gags, calling the film "a disingenuous, one-note underdog portrait." Nathan Lee, writing for The New York Times, called the film a "cinematic black hole" for heavily relying on its "single, repetitive, aggressively tedious joke" about a teenager being mocked for his physical and mental geriatric features, saying that: "Harold is the type of one-note dead zone ideally suited for a bathroom break while sitting home on a Saturday night, alone and semidrunk, in front of the television. At feature length it's enough to make you tear your hair out."
