= Disney's The Kid =

2000 film directed by Jon Turteltaub

The Kid
- Theatrical release poster
- Directed by: Jon Turteltaub
- Written by: Audrey Wells
- Produced by: Hunt Lowry; Christina Steinberg; Jon Turteltaub
- Starring: Bruce Willis; Spencer Breslin; Emily Mortimer; Lily Tomlin; Chi McBride
- Cinematography: Peter Menzies Jr.
- Edited by: Peter Honess; David Rennie
- Music by: Marc Shaiman
- Production companies: Walt Disney Pictures; Junction Entertainment
- Distributed by: Buena Vista Pictures Distribution
- Release date: July 7, 2000
- Running time: 104 minutes
- Country: United States
- Language: English
- Budget: $65 million
- Box office: $110.3 million

The Kid (also known as Disney's The Kid) is a 2000 American fantasy comedy-drama film, directed by Jon Turteltaub and written by Audrey Wells. The film follows a 40-year-old image consultant (Bruce Willis) who is mysteriously confronted by an eight-year-old version of himself (Spencer Breslin); Emily Mortimer, Lily Tomlin, Chi McBride, and Jean Smart also star.

The film was released in the United States by Buena Vista Pictures Distribution on July 7, 2000. It received mixed reviews from critics and grossed $110.3 million against its $65 million budget.

== Plot ==
Days from turning 40, Russ Duritz is a successful but unsympathetic image consultant in Los Angeles and has a strained relationship with his father. Returning home one day he finds a toy plane on his porch and a strange boy indoors, whom he chases through the streets.

After seeing the boy enter a diner, Russ finds no sign of him inside. Thinking he is hallucinating, he visits a psychiatrist, but finds the same boy on his couch eating popcorn and watching cartoons when he returns home. The boy says his name is Rusty and that he was just searching for his toy plane.

Seeing a resemblance, Russ compares memories and birthmarks and realizes Rusty is actually himself as a kid. After questioning Russ, Rusty tells him, "I grow up to be a loser." Rusty dreams of owning a dog named Chester and flying planes, but Russ gave up on those dreams.

Russ's co-worker Amy thinks that Russ and Rusty are father and son and accuses him of being a dead-beat dad. Rusty assures her he is not his son and implores Russ to tell her the truth, but he thinks she'd never believe them. Amy realizes the truth while watching the two argue, as they are nearly identical.

In response to Rusty's questions about how he became Russ, he tells him about his scholarship to UCLA and working for six years to get a master's degree and change himself to who he is. Rusty understands Russ's job as an image consultant to be training people to pretend to be somebody else.

Russ cancels his appointments and spends the day with Rusty, trying to figure out what from the past needs to be fixed to get him back home. Driving through a tunnel, Russ recalls a fight he lost with some bullies who were abusing a three-legged dog. They emerge from the tunnel into Rusty's eighth birthday in 1968.

Russ helps Rusty win the fight and save the dog’s life, but realizes that the fight itself was only the first half of the ordeal. Rusty's loving but terminally ill mother is called to take him home early, where his father angrily berates him for causing his mother more stress, convinced he was trying to kill her faster with the stunt he pulled. Rusty breaks down crying in an attempt to tell his dad that he found the screw he lost, but his father refuses to listen and harshly tells him to stop crying and grow up, making Russ realize why he is the way he is today. Tearfully, Russ assures Rusty that he was not responsible for his mother's death, and that his father's outburst was simply because he was scared about the prospect of raising him alone.

When they return to the present time, they celebrate their birthday at the diner and drink milkshakes, but realize their efforts to change the outcome of the day have failed, as their father's outburst left Rusty emotionally scarred in both cases. When a dog named Chester greets Rusty, they find that his owner is an older version of them who owns planes and has a family with Amy.

Now knowing that Rusty's appearance was meant to change his own ways rather than Rusty's, Russ arranges to see his father to reconcile with him, and, with a puppy, visits Amy, who invites him into her home.

== Cast ==
- Bruce Willis as Russell Morley "Russ" Duritz
  - Spencer Breslin as young Rusty Duritz
- Emily Mortimer as Amy
- Lily Tomlin as Janet
- Jean Smart as Deidre Lefever
- Daniel von Bargen as Sam Duritz (Russ's estranged father)
- Chi McBride as Kenny
- Dana Ivey as Dr. Suzanne Alexander
- Stanley Anderson as Bob Riley
- Reiley McClendon as Mark
- Steve Tom as Bruce, the Lawyer
- Juanita Moore as Kenny's Grandmother
- Larry King as himself
- Jeri Ryan as herself
- Nick Chinlund as himself
- Esther Scott as Clarissa
- Matthew Perry (uncredited) as Mr. Vivian
- Melissa McCarthy as Skyway Diner Waitress
- Elizabeth Arlen as Gloria Duritz (Russ's deceased mother)

== Production ==
The screenplay for The Kid was written by Audrey Wells, who originally had plans to direct with Jon Turteltaub as a producer. However, Turteltaub fell in love with the story and decided to direct. He had Bruce Willis in mind to play Russ, saying "Bruce is perfect for the part because he has this movie star thing of being incredibly likable on screen, which really works well when you have a guy who's playing a jerk."

The Kid was part of a three-picture deal that Willis cut with Disney to compensate them for the dissolution of 1997's Broadway Brawler.

== Reception ==
=== Box office ===
Disney's The Kid opened at #4 at the North American box office, making $12,687,726 in its opening weekend, behind The Patriot, The Perfect Storm, and Scary Movie. The film eventually ended its run by grossing $69,691,949 in North America and $40,625,631 elsewhere, thus bringing its worldwide total to $110,317,580, against a $65 million budget.

=== Critical response ===
Upon its release, the film received mixed reviews from critics. On the review aggregator website Rotten Tomatoes, 49% of 99 critics' reviews are positive, with an average rating of 5.3/10. The website's consensus reads: "Critics find The Kid to be too sweet and the movie's message to be annoyingly simplistic." Metacritic, which uses a weighted average, assigned the film a score of 45 out of 100, based on 32 critics, indicating "mixed or average" reviews. Audiences polled by CinemaScore gave the film an average grade of "A−" on an A+ to F scale.

Film critic Roger Ebert of the Chicago Sun-Times gave the movie 3 stars out of 4, observing that "Disney's The Kid is warm-hearted and effective, a sweet little parable that involves a man and a boy who help each other become a better boy, and a better man. It's a sweet film, unexpectedly involving, and shows again that Willis, so easily identified with action movies, is gifted in the areas of comedy and pathos: This is a cornball plot, and he lends it credibility just by being in it." Film critic A. O. Scott, writing for The New York Times, observed: "Mr. Willis stands by while a child swipes a movie out of his open palm...Spencer Breslin, Russ is tubby, cute-but-annoying almost-8-year-old self."

More critical reviews cited the film's approach, which they described as too sentimental in tone. The San Francisco Examiner's Welsey Morris called the film a "dishonest baby boomer melodrama of inner-selfness and increased sensitivity for yuppie dads", noting that it "wields its Middle America values and moralistic flogging of idiosyncratic lifestyle choices like a flipped bird", though he commented Breslin is "more charming than the film deserves". Todd McCarthy of Variety wrote "director Jon Turteltaub's insistence upon hammering every point home with giant closeups and relentless musical underlining makes this insufferably cloying and sickly sweet for anyone with the least intolerance to 'find the inner child' saccharinity".

== Accolades ==
Association	Category	Nominee	Result	Ref.
Saturn Awards	Best Performance by a Younger Actor	Spencer Breslin	Nominated	
Young Artist Awards	Best Performance in a Feature Film – Young Actor Age Ten or Under	Spencer Breslin	Won	
Young Artist Awards	Best Family Feature Film – Comedy	Spencer Breslin	Nominated	
YoungStar Awards	Best Young Actor in a Comedy Film	Spencer Breslin	Nominated	
