= Camilla Belle =

American actress (born 1986)

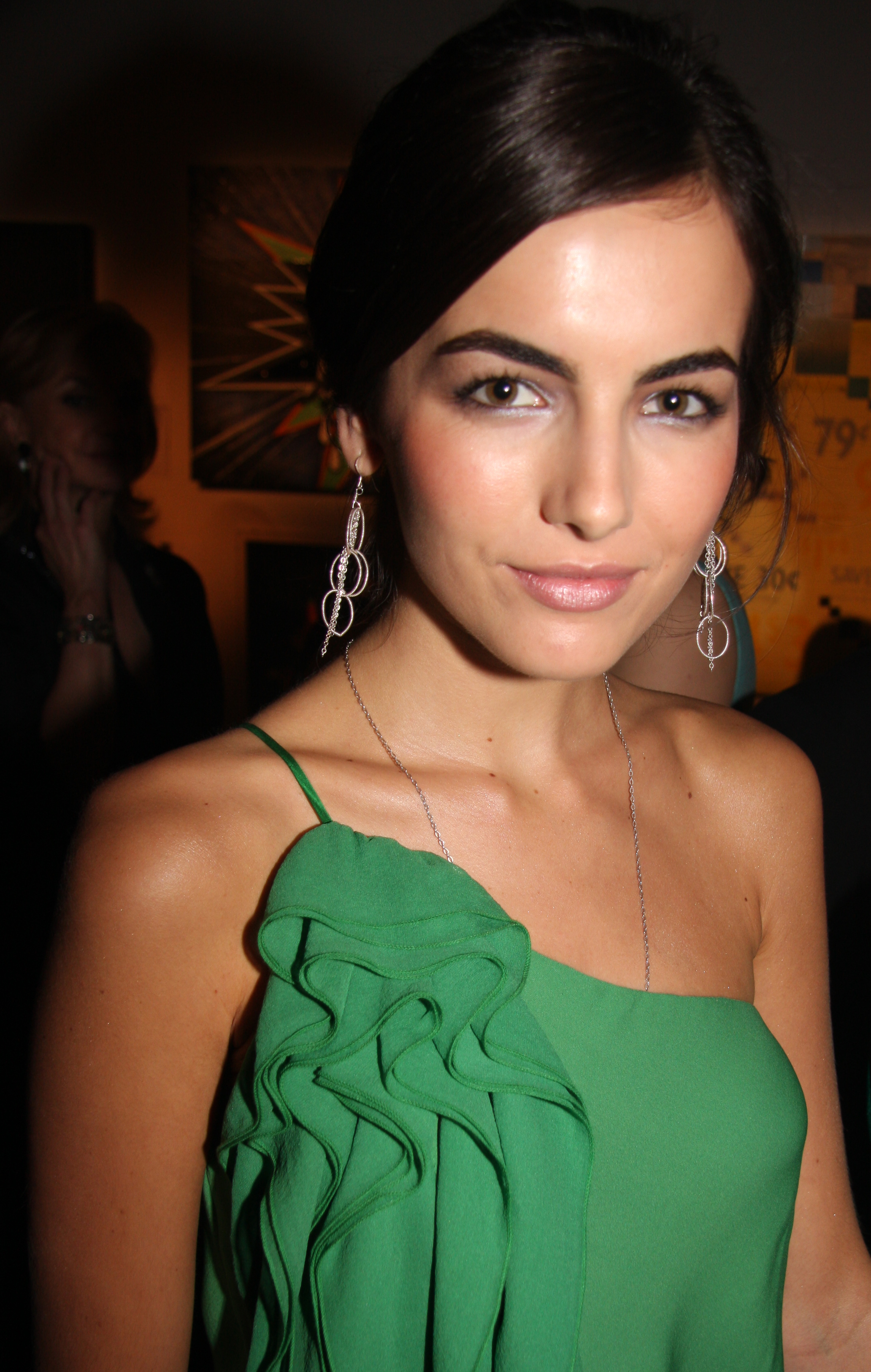
- Belle in 2009
- Born: Camilla Belle Routh; October 2, 1986 (age 40); Los Angeles, California, U.S.
- Occupation: Actress
- Years active: 1992–present

Camilla Belle Routh (born October 2, 1986) is an American actress. Born and raised in Los Angeles, California, Belle began her acting career with appearances in television commercials before landing her first lead role in NBC's thriller, Trapped Beneath the Earth in 1992. She has since appeared in a variety of films and television shows, including A Little Princess (1995), The Lost World: Jurassic Park (1997), Practical Magic (1998), Rip Girls (2000) and 10,000 BC (2008). Belle has also been recognized for her work in independent films such as The Quiet (2005) and The Mad Whale (2017).

In addition to her acting career, Belle has been the face of Vera Wang's "Princess" fragrance and has appeared in advertisements for brands such as Nespresso and Cotton. She is also known for her fashion choices, having been featured on the cover of fashion magazines and being the recipient of Young Hollywood Style Icon award at the 2011 Young Hollywood Awards. Belle's personal life, including her relationships and her bilingual upbringing in English and Portuguese, has also garnered media attention.

== Early life ==
Belle was born on October 2, 1986. Her mother, Deborah Cristina Gould, is Brazilian.

She attended Marlborough School, an all-girl high school in Los Angeles. She grew up speaking English and Portuguese. During her childhood, she frequently visited her mother's family in Brazil. She was raised in her mother's devout Roman Catholic faith.

== Career ==
Belle began her career as a child actor appearing in television commercials for brands such as Cabbage Patch Kids, Campbell's Soup, Public Broadcasting System and Eli Lilly Pharmaceutical. At age five, Belle landed her first lead role in a film, the NBC thriller film Trouble Shooter: Trapped Beneath the Earth (1993). In 1995, she appeared in A Little Princess based on the novel of the same name. In the science fiction film The Lost World: Jurassic Park (1997), she played Cathy Bowman, a young wealthy British girl attacked by a pack of Compsognathus. In 1998, she played Aubrey Shepard on the Focus on the Family radio drama Adventures in Odyssey. Following a turn as Steven Seagal's daughter in The Patriot (1998), she earned a 1999 Young Artist Award nomination for her portrayal of Sandra Bullock's character as a girl in Practical Magic (1998), as well as another nomination the same year for her guest appearance on the television series Walker: Texas Ranger.

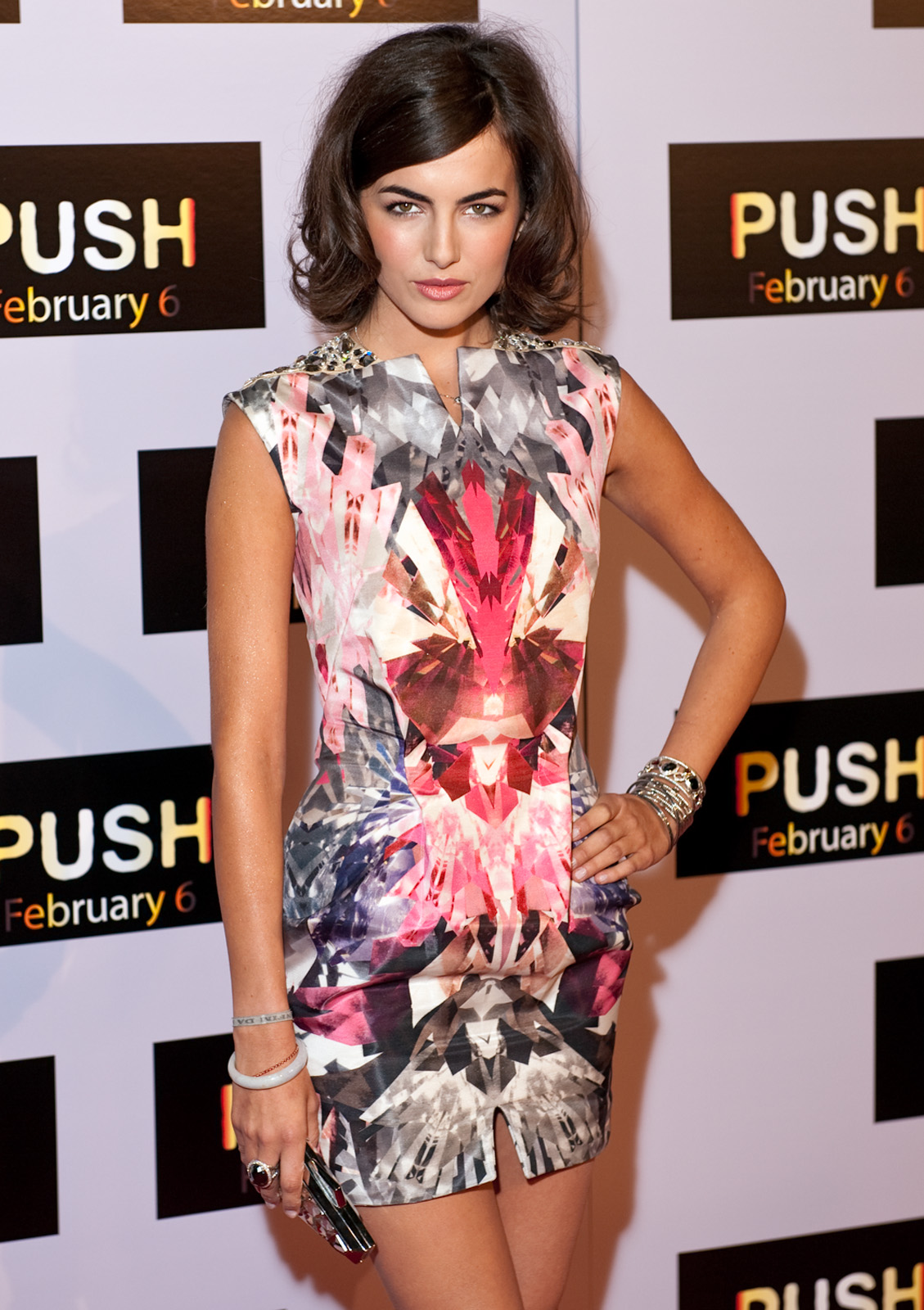
Belle at the premiere of Push in Los Angeles in January 2009

She received her third and fourth Young Artist Award nominations respectively for the television film Replacing Dad (1999) and for her first lead role, in the Disney Channel television film Rip Girls (2000). Belle played the lead role in the television film Back to the Secret Garden (2001), then took a break from acting before returning with a role in the independent film The Quiet (2005). SFStation wrote that "performance-wise The Quiet belongs to Camilla Belle and Elisha Cuthbert". In 2006, she signed a multi-year contract to become the face of Vera Wang's "Princess" fragrance, appearing in print advertisements and television commercials. Her contract ended in July 2009.

She portrayed the lead role of sixteen-year-old Jill Johnson in the remake of When a Stranger Calls (2006). Belle plays a babysitter who receives threatening phone calls from an unidentified stranger. The film grossed $67.1 million at the worldwide box office. In 2007, she appeared in coffee brand Nespresso's television commercial alongside actor George Clooney. She then played a lead role in the Roland Emmerich-directed action-adventure film 10,000 BC (2008) that grossed $269 million at the worldwide box office.

In April 2012, Belle signed on to appear in Cotton Incorporated's "The Fabric of My Life" campaign with actress Emmy Rossum. Belle's advertisement was inspired by her hometown, Los Angeles and she also sang in it. In November 2016, Belle appeared as a guest judge on Bravo's television series Project Runway, in the episode "A Power Trip". She played Isabel Wallace in the drama-thriller film The Mad Whale (2017), a student project produced by James Franco's Elysium Bandini Studios and the USC School of Cinematic Arts. In 2022, she portrayed Pearl Serrano on the third season of NBC‘s crime drama series Law & Order: Organized Crime and played Agnes in the Netflix original film Carter (2022).

Belle starred as Carina in Fox's streaming platform Tubi's original romantic comedy film 10 Truths About Love (2022), which anchored the platform's Valentine's Day programming event. On September 9, 2023, the film was released by Great American Family channel and renamed as Love Can Surprise You. She appeared as the female lead in Ben Barnes' music video for the song "Beloved", released on November 1, 2024.

== Public image ==
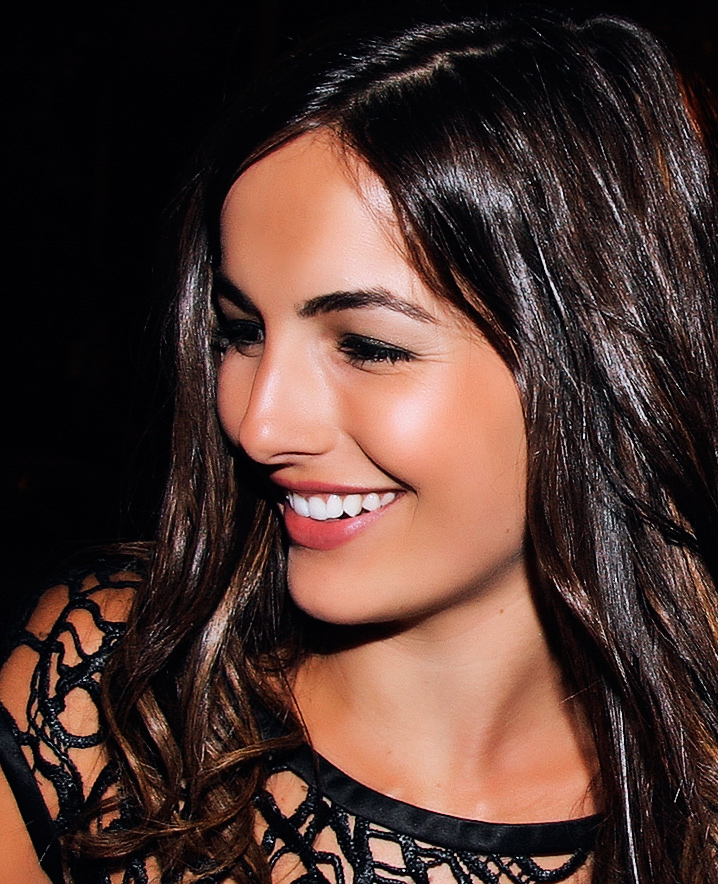
Belle at the 2010 Toronto International Film Festival.

Belle's appearance and fashion choices have been a subject of media attention. Fashion magazines she has appeared on the cover of include Teen Vogue, Elle, Harper's Bazaar, Tatler, Ocean Drive, Glamour, Nylon, Vanidades, Lucky, ES Magazine and Genlux. She has been a guest star at New York Fashion Week, among other fashion events. She has also been a runway model for Alberta Ferretti and The Heart Truth's Red Dress Collection.

Her style has been praised by Cosmopolitan, InStyle and People magazines. In 2007, People magazine named her "Fashionista of the Week" during Mercedes-Benz Fall Fashion Week in New York City. People wrote that Belle "managed to look appropriate and fashion-forward at every event she went to this week, including Max Azria, Oscar de la Renta and Miss Sixty". As of 2017, Belle had never worked with a professional stylist, crediting her mother as her stylist instead. In her fashion choices, Belle and her mother are inspired by Elizabeth Taylor and Old Hollywood. She received the Young Hollywood Style Icon award at the Young Hollywood Awards in May 2011.

== Personal life ==
Belle dated singer Joe Jonas from September 2008 to July 2009. They met during filming the Jonas Brothers music video "Lovebug" in which she appears as the lead actress. Belle briefly dated American football player Tim Tebow from October to December 2012.

== Filmography ==
=== Film ===
Year	Title	Role	Notes	Ref.
1995	A Little Princess	Jane		
1996	Poison Ivy II: Lily	Daphna Falk	Direct-to-video film	
1997	The Lost World: Jurassic Park	Cathy Bowman		
1998	Practical Magic	Young Sally Owens		
1998	The Patriot	Holly McClaren	Direct-to-video film	
1999	Secret of the Andes	Diana Willings		
2001	The Invisible Circus	Phoebe O'Connor (ages 10–12)		
2005	The Ballad of Jack and Rose	Rose Slavin		
2005	The Chumscrubber	Crystal Falls		
2005	The Quiet	Dot		
2006	When a Stranger Calls	Jill Johnson		
2007	The Trap	Hermia	Short film	
2008	10,000 BC	Evolet		
2009	Push	Kira Hollis • Hollis		
2009	Adrift	Ângela	À Deriva (Brazilian title)	
2010	Father of Invention	Claire Elizabeth (née Axle)		
2010	Dirty Dancing 3: Capoeira Nights	Baby	Short film	
2011	From Prada to Nada	Nora Dominguez-Ferris		
2011	Breakaway	Melissa Winters	Speedy Singhs (Hindi title)	
2012	Open Road	Angie		
2012	Lovelocked	Cyd	Short film	
2013	Zero Hour	Paula	Short film	
2014	Cavemen	Tess		
2014	Amapola	Ama		
2014	Bald	Linda	Short film	
2015	Diablo	Alexsandra		
2016	The American Side	Emily Chase		
2016	Sundown	Gaby / Jessica		
2017	The Mad Whale	Isabel Wallace		
2022	10 Truths About Love	Carina Franklin	Tubi original film; also known as Love Can Surprise You	
2022	Carter	Agnes	Netflix original film	

=== Television ===
Year	Title	Role	Notes	Ref.
1993	Empty Cradle	Sally	Television film (ABC)	
1993	Trouble Shooters: Trapped Beneath the Earth	Jennifer Gates	Television film (NBC)	
1994	Deconstructing Sarah	Young Elizabeth	Television film (USA Network)	
1995	Annie: A Royal Adventure!	Molly	Television film (ABC)	
1996	Marshal Law	Boot Coleman	Television film (Showtime)	
1998	Walker, Texas Ranger	Cindy Morgan	Episode: "Code of the West"	
1999	Replacing Dad	Mandy	Television film (CBS)	
2000	The Wild Thornberrys	Calf	Voice role; Episode: "Where the Gauchos Roam"	
2000	Rip Girls	Sydney Miller	Television film (Disney Channel)	
2001	Back to the Secret Garden	Elizabeth "Lizzy" Buscana	Television film (Hallmark Channel)	
2016	Project Runway	Herself	Guest judge; Episode: "A Power Trip"	
2018–2019	Mickey and the Roadster Racers	Almanda De Quack	Voice role; 2 episodes	
2019	Dollface	Melyssa	Episodes: "History Buff" & "Bridesmaid"	
2022	Law & Order: Organized Crime	Pearl Serrano	Recurring role; 6 episodes (season 3)	

=== Music videos ===
Year	Title	Artist(s)	Role
1993	"This Christmas"	Gloria Estefan	
2008	"Lovebug"	Jonas Brothers	
2011	"Shera di Kaum"	Akshay Kumar featuring Ludacris	
2011	"Ne Aaja Veh"	Vinay Virmani	
2013	"Heart Attack"	Enrique Iglesias	Love interest
2024	"Beloved"	Ben Barnes	Female lead

=== Other credits ===
Year	Title	Notes
2016	Looking at the Stars	Executive producer
2021	Phobias	Writer and director (segment Hoplophobia)

== Awards and nominations ==
List of awards and nominations
Year	Award	Category	Work	Result
1999	Young Artist Award	Best Performance in a TV Drama Series – Guest Starring Young Actress	Walker, Texas Ranger	Nominated
1999	Young Artist Award	Best Performance in a Feature Film – Supporting Young Actress	Practical Magic	Nominated
2000	Young Artist Award	Best Performance in a TV Movie or Pilot – Supporting Young Actress	Replacing Dad	Nominated
2001	Young Artist Award	Best Performance in a TV Movie (Drama) – Leading Young Actress	Rip Girls	Nominated
2005	Gotham Awards	Breakthrough Actor	The Ballad of Jack and Rose	Nominated
2011	Young Hollywood Awards	Young Hollywood Style Icon		Won
2017	Art of Elysium Gala	The Art of Elysium's Spirit of Elysium Award		Won
