= The Mad Whale =

- Film poster
- Directed by: Sonia A. Guggenheim; David Breschel; Jenna Cavelle; Luke Haskard; Ariel Heller; Adam Linzey; Matt McClung; Uttera Singh; Andrew Wood
- Written by: Michael Alan Herman; Colleen O'Halloran; Paul Rufus Jones; Max Newman; Megan Seely; Ryan Koehn; Kelly Austin Davis; Sara Silkin; Nikolaj Wejp-Olsen
- Produced by: James Franco; Austin Kolodney; Vince Jolivette; Brandon Somerhalder
- Starring: Camilla Belle; Dominic Rains; Summer Phoenix; James Franco
- Cinematography: Guan Xi
- Edited by: Takashi Uchida
- Music by: Layla Minoui
- Production company: Elysium Bandini Studios
- Distributed by: Front Row Filmed Entertainment
- Release date: October 19, 2017 (Heartland Film Festival)
- Running time: 99 minutes
- Country: United States
- Language: English

The Mad Whale is a 2017 American drama-thriller film directed by 9 different directors, which was produced by James Franco's Elysium Bandini Studios and the USC School of Cinematic Arts. The film stars Camilla Belle, Dominic Rains, Summer Phoenix and James Franco. The film was premiered on 19 October 2017 at the Heartland Film Festival.

== Cast ==
- Camilla Belle as Isabel Wallace
- Dominic Rains as Dr. Benjamin Calhoun
- Summer Phoenix as Beatrice Price
- James Franco as Edward Fry
- Michael Weston as Tobias
- Carmen Argenziano as Dr. Withers
- Nicole Starrett as Nurse Phoebe Stokes
- Kai Lennox as The Chairman
- Alan Bagh as John / Orderly
- Vince Jolivette as Board Member
- Lori Jean Wilson as Dierdre

== Reception ==
Shown at the Heartland Film Festival, and Newport Beach Film Festival, a student-critic from Ball State University gave the film a positive review.
