= The Ultimate Christmas Present =

2000 American TV film

- Promotional advertisement
- Written by: Michael Hitchcock
- Story by: Hallie Einhorn; Michael Hitchcock
- Directed by: Greg Beeman
- Starring: Hallee Hirsh; Spencer Breslin; Hallie Todd; Brenda Song; John Salley; Susan Ruttan; Greg Kean; Bill Fagerbakke; Peter Scolari
- Theme music composer: Phil Marshall
- Country of origin: United States
- Original language: English

Production
- Producer: Harvey Frand
- Cinematography: Christopher Faloona; Kark Herrmann
- Editor: Terry Stokes
- Running time: 80 minutes
- Production company: Once Upon a Time

Original release
- Network: Disney Channel
- Release: December 1, 2000

The Ultimate Christmas Present is a 2000 American Christmas fantasy comedy film released as a Disney Channel Original Movie and starring Brenda Song and Hallee Hirsh. It premiered December 1, 2000 on Disney Channel as part of their Christmas season.

== Plot ==
Two young girls, Allison Rachel "Allie" Thompson (age 13) (Hallee Hirsh) and Samantha Elizabeth "Sam" Kwan (age 13) (Brenda Song) are two best friends living in Los Angeles. The two have an essay due at school the last day before Christmas vacation, but Allie does not have hers even started yet. On a bike ride through the woods, they find a weather machine at a shack and take it to Allie's home. After learning of its controls, Allie convinces Sam they use it to make it snow in Los Angeles to start Christmas vacation a day early and to avoid having to turn in her essay.

It turns out that the weather machine belongs to Santa Claus (John B. Lowe) and he informs Mrs. Claus about this. To help Santa Claus, she sends two elves, Crumpet (John Salley) and Sparky (Bill Fagerbakke).

A weather man named Edwin Hadley (Peter Scolari) tries to figure out what's causing the strange weather and track it down to keep himself from getting fired by his boss Mr. Martino (Jason Schombing). Mr. Martino expects Edwin to get down to the bottom of the sudden snow appearances.

When Sparky and Crumpet catch up to Santa Claus, they find a footprint of a type of girl shoes that are only made in California. Santa and the elves set off to interrogate each girl on the naughty list that wears those type of shoes.

Soon, the snowstorm gets so large that it spreads to San Francisco and Allie's dad, Steve gets snowed in at the airport and may not make it home in time for Christmas. Allie tries to turn it off, but overnight it turns itself back on and it creates a blizzard. They are unable to make it do anything now. Sam shares sad stories with Allie about how her dad would spend Christmas, while Allie is sad about her dad missing Christmas.

The blizzard creates a traffic jam Edwin finds himself stuck in as he tracks the weather phenomenon to Allie's house. He steals a man's snowmobile to bypass it.

When the power goes out due to the storm, Allie and Sam head to Allie's shed to get flashlights. They then encounter Santa, Crumpet, and Sparky who identify Allie as the next person on their naughty list while her best friend Sam is a positive overachiever and good role model in school. When they doubt his identity, Santa Claus tells the girls all about their secrets and the weather machine.

Edwin arrives at Allie's house and manages to gain entry. He finds the weather machine and announces his plans to be the best weather man in history and gain more publicity on television attempts. During his escape, he sees the man he stole the snowmobile from and crashes into a chocolate making factory where he falls into a chocolate vat. The group follow his trail into the chocolate factory. Sparky follows him up into the rafters where he falls into a box of cotton candy. The group then reclaims the weather machine from him.

At Santa's shack, he works to find the problem in the weather machine. With Sam and Allie's help, they manage to fix the weather machine by fitting the right batteries and stop the weather. Santa then tells Edwin that there is another type of job for him.

Crumpet and Sparky pick up Steve just in time for Christmas morning. Meanwhile, Edwin gets a job in the Antarctic teaching scientists about the weather.

== Cast ==
- Hallee Hirsh as Allison Rachel "Allie" Thompson
- Spencer Breslin as Joey Thompson, Allie's younger brother
- Hallie Todd as Michelle Thompson, Allie's mother
- Brenda Song as Samantha Elizabeth "Sam" Kwan, Allie's best friend
- John Salley as Crumpet the Elf
- Susan Ruttan as Mrs. Claus
- Greg Kean as Steve Thompson, Allie's father
- Bill Fagerbakke as Sparky the Elf
- Peter Scolari as Edwin Hadley, the weatherman of the Action New 3 News
- John B. Lowe as Santa Claus
- Jason Schombing as Mr. Martino, Edwin's boss
- Tiffany Desrosiers as Tina

== Accolades ==
Spencer Breslin was Joey in the movie, and garnered a 2000 Young Artist Award nomination for Best Performance in a TV Movie (Comedy or Drama) Young Actor Age 10 or Under.

== See also ==
- List of Christmas films
- Santa Claus in film
