= Spencer Breslin =

American actor (born 1992)

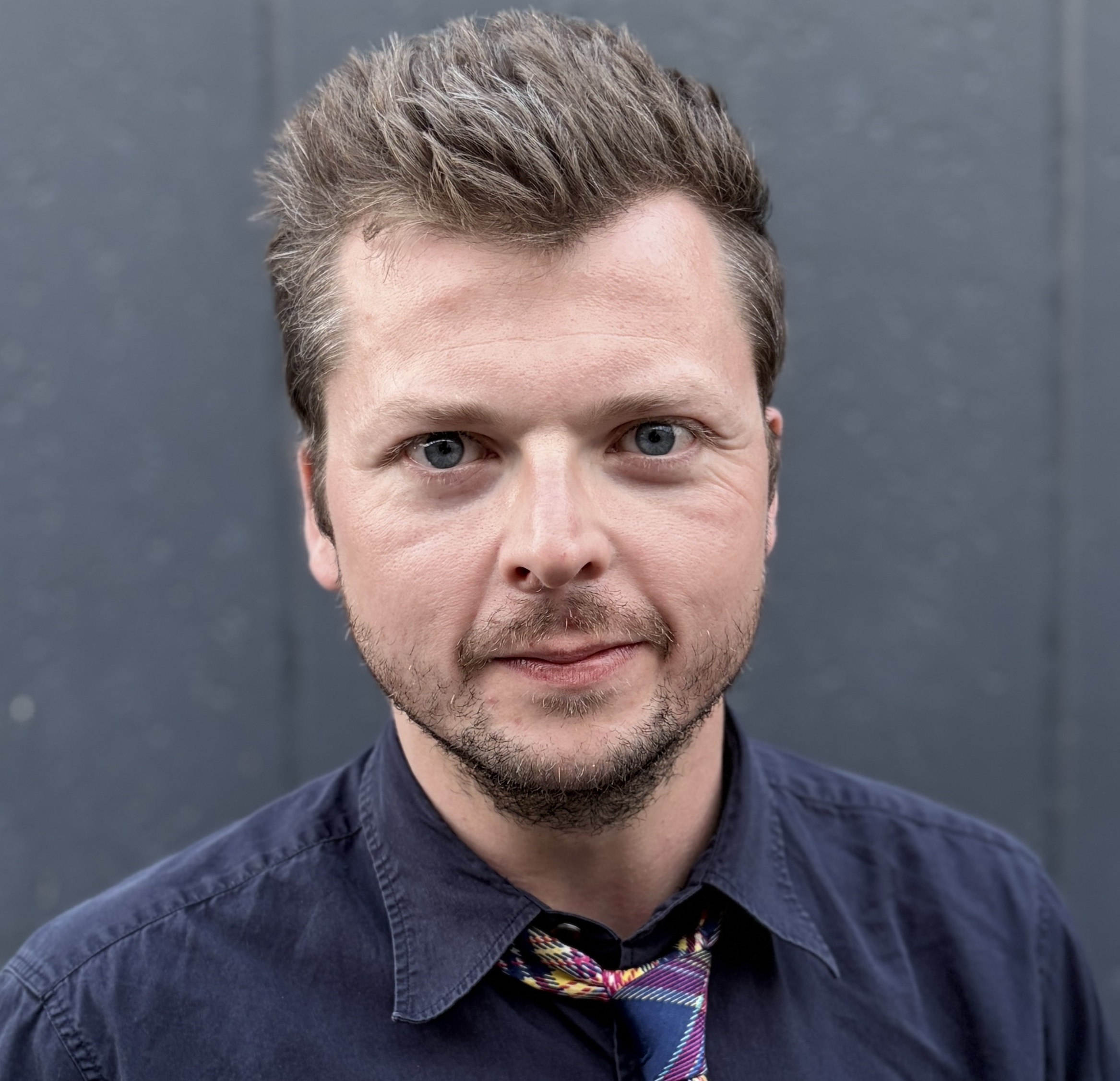
- Breslin in 2026
- Born: May 18, 1992 (age 34); New York City, U.S.
- Occupation: Actor
- Years active: 1997–present
- Spouse: Grace Tame (m. 2017; div. 2021)
- Relatives: Abigail Breslin (sister)

Spencer Breslin (born May 18, 1992) is an American actor and songwriter. His film roles include Disney's The Kid, The Santa Clause 2, The Santa Clause 3: The Escape Clause, The Cat in the Hat, Raising Helen, The Princess Diaries 2: Royal Engagement, The Shaggy Dog, and Harold. He has also appeared on the television shows Teamo Supremo, Stephen King's Storm of the Century, and Law & Order.

As of 2016, Breslin has been writing songs for and playing in his band, Broken Machine. He also co-hosts the Spencer & Lara's Vomitorium podcast.

== Early life ==
Breslin was born in New York City, New York, to Michael Breslin, a telecommunications consultant of Irish and Austrian-Jewish heritage, and Kim Breslin (née Walsh), a talent manager of predominantly Irish and English heritage. He has two siblings: older brother Ryan (b. 1985) and younger sister Abigail (b. 1996), who are both actors. They were raised on the Lower East Side, where they were homeschooled by their mother.

== Acting career ==
=== Early career (1997–2004) ===
Breslin was discovered by a talent scout at a New York City playground at the age of three and went on to star in more than 50 commercials for McDonald's, Life cereal, Pampers, and other products. He made his TV debut at age four and was a series regular in the first season of ABC's 1997 sitcom Soul Man, in which he played the youngest child of Dan Aykroyd's character. He later guest-starred in several shows, including Law & Order, before appearing in Stephen King's Storm of the Century in 1999.

At eight years old, Breslin starred in the 2000 fantasy comedy-drama film Disney's The Kid as Rusty alongside Bruce Willis, who played the adult version of the same character, Russ.

For that role, Breslin won the 2000 Young Artist Award for Best Performance in a Feature Film by a Young Actor Age Ten or Under at the 22nd Young Artist Awards presented by the Young Artist Association. He was also nominated for the 2001 Saturn Award for Best Performance by a Younger Actor, awarded by the Academy of Science Fiction, Fantasy and Horror Films, and the 2000 Young Star Award for Best Young Actor in a Comedy Film, presented by The Hollywood Reporter.

He played a little boy in the 2000 comedy film Meet the Parents. Later that year, he played Joey in the Disney Channel Original Movie The Ultimate Christmas Present, and was nominated for the 2000 Young Artist Award for Best Performance in a TV Movie (Comedy or Drama) Young Actor Age 10 or Under.

A young Breslin played Curtis the Elf in the 2002 Christmas comedy-fantasy film The Santa Clause 2, the first of four films in which he co-starred alongside Tim Allen. He also appeared in the 2002 TV movie Mom's on Strike; and as a pesky younger brother in the 2003 film You Wish!.

Breslin was nominated for a 2003 Young Artist Award for Best Performance in a Voice-Over Role at the 24th Young Artist Awards for his work in 2002's Return to Neverland voicing the role of Cubby the lost boy. That same year, he also played the voice of Captain Crandall/Cap in the Disney animated television series Teamo Supremo.

In 2003, Breslin starred alongside Dakota Fanning and Mike Myers in the 2003 fantasy comedy film The Cat in the Hat as Conrad, the older brother of Fanning's character. The film was critically panned and grossed $134 million worldwide.

Breslin played on-screen siblings with his real-life younger sister Abigail Breslin in the 2004 comedy drama Raising Helen, starring Kate Hudson as their aunt and guardian. The two siblings worked together again in the 2004 romantic comedy The Princess Diaries 2: Royal Engagement, in which Breslin at the age of 12 played a prince and Abigail made a cameo as a girl at an orphanage. The film made $134.8 million at the worldwide box office. In 2004, Breslin was a regular on the short-lived CBS sitcom Center of the Universe starring John Goodman. He appeared in the Wonderfalls episode "Lovesick Ass".

Also in 2004, Breslin was asked to read alongside Alyson Stoner, Dylan and Cole Sprouse, and Hailey Anne Nelson when Dr. Seuss won his Star on the Hollywood Walk of Fame.

=== Mid-career (2005–2009) ===
In 2006, Breslin reprised his role as Curtis the Elf in The Santa Clause 3: The Escape Clause. He also appeared in the superhero action-adventure comedy Zoom and the comedy The Shaggy Dog that same year.

Breslin went on to star as the titular character in the 2007 comedy Harold, about a teen who starts prematurely balding at an early age. He also appeared as Josh in M. Night Shyamalan's doomsday thriller The Happening.

=== Later career (2010–present) ===
Breslin lent his voice as Anthony to the 2010 animated 3-D educational sci-fi adventure film Quantum Quest: A Cassini Space Odyssey. In 2010, MTV listed Breslin as one of "The 17 Coolest 17 Year-Olds from Around the World".

Breslin appeared as Max in the 2011 film Born to Race. He then played Jason in the 2012 romantic comedy drama Stuck in Love. Breslin appeared alongside Abigail as Cousin Derek in the 2012 crime drama Perfect Sisters. Breslin also began to work in other aspects of film making, serving as an executive producer on the animated Really Bad Movie! in 2013, as well as writing and directing his own short films.

Breslin starred as Isaac in the 2016 horror film Some Kind of Hate, which starred Grace Phipps and Sierra McCormick and played at the Stanley Film Festival, the Fantasia International Film Festival, and Fright Fest.

In July 2016, Breslin began co-hosting the Spencer & Lara's Vomitorium weekly podcast, dedicated to "complaining about the unbearable, insufferable, and aggravating." Only three episodes aired, the last on August 13 of that year. The website was offline within a year.

== Music ==
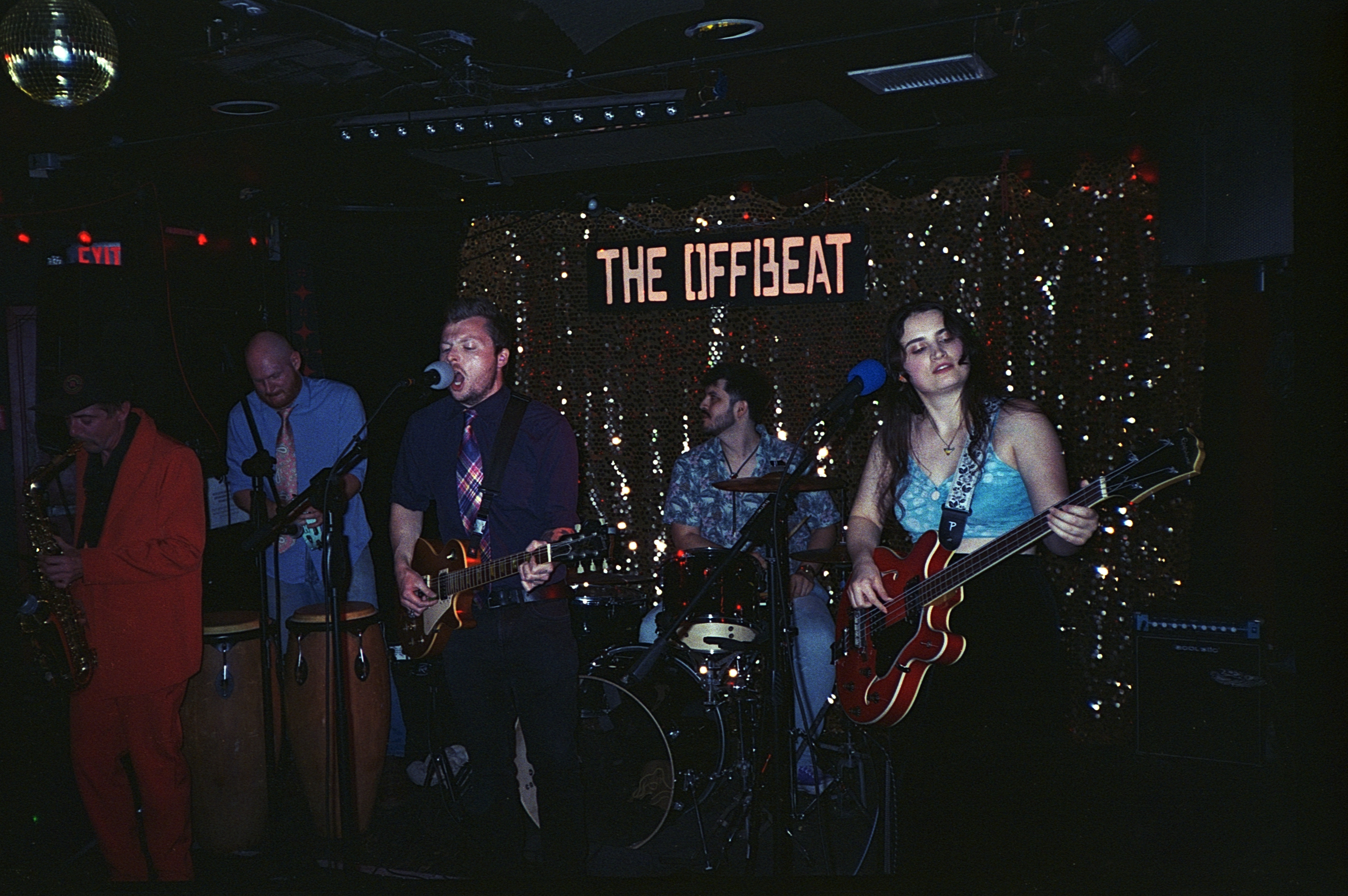
Breslin (center) performing with his band in April 2026

Breslin finished recording his folk-indie debut album Labor Day in October 2009; the album was released in August 2012. It was recorded by Ladybug Transistor's Gary Olson and produced by James William Hindle.

Breslin has founded his own record label, Acadian Recording Company.

As of July 2016, he was playing in his rock 'n roll, indie folk band; Broken Machine. Breslin writes all of his own music.

== Personal life ==
Breslin married Australian activist Grace Tame in 2017; they divorced in 2021 after four years of marriage.

== Awards and nominations ==
Breslin won the 2000 Young Artist Award for Best Performance in a Feature Film by a Young Actor Age Ten or Under. He was also nominated for the 2000 Young Artist Award for Best Performance in a TV Movie (Comedy or Drama) - Young Actor Age 10 or Under, the 2000 YoungStar Award for Best Young Actor in a Comedy Film, the 2001 Saturn Award for Best Performance by a Younger Actor, the 2003 Young Artist Award as Best Performance in a Voice-Over Role, and the 2007 Young Artist Award for Best Performance in a Feature Film by a Young Ensemble Cast.

=== List of awards ===
Award	Year	Category	Result	Role
Young Artist Awards	2000	Best Performance in a TV Movie (Comedy or Drama); Young Actor Age 10 or Under	Nominated	Joey in The Ultimate Christmas Present
The Saturn Awards	2001	Best Performance by a Younger Actor	Nominated	Rusty Duritz in Disney's The Kid
Young Artist Awards	2001	Best Performance in a Feature Film - Young Actor Age Ten or Under	Won	Rusty Duritz in Disney's The Kid
Young Artist Awards	2001	Best Performance in a TV Movie (Comedy or Drama) - Young Actor Age Ten or Under	Nominated	Joey Thompson in The Ultimate Christmas Present
Stinkers Bad Movie Awards	2003	The Spencer Breslin Award (for Worst Performance by a Child in a Feature Role)	Won	Conrad Walden in The Cat in the Hat
Young Artist Awards	2003	2003 Young Artist Award as Best Performance in a Voice-Over Role	Nominated	Cubby in Return to Neverland
Stinkers Bad Movie Awards	2006	The Spencer Breslin Award (for Worst Performance by a Child in a Feature Role)	Won	Curtis the Elf in The Santa Clause 3: The Escape Clause, Josh in The Shaggy Dog, and Tucker Williams/Mega Boy in Zoom
Young Artist Awards	2007	Best Young Ensemble in a Feature Film	Nominated	Curtis the Elf in Santa Clause 3: The Escape Clause

== Discography ==
=== Labor Day ===
Labor Day

Studio album by Spencer Breslin
- Released: August 14, 2012
- Recorded: October 2008 – October 2009, Marlborough Farms, Brooklyn
- Genre: Folk rock
- Length: 35:40
- Language: English
- Label: Acadian Recording Co.
- Producer: James William Hindle

Labor Day is Breslin's debut album, released under his own label, Acadian Recording Co., on August 14, 2012.

Written and composed by 16-year-old Breslin, Labor Day was recorded by Gary Olson — known for his engineering work for acts such as Cold Cave, Jens Lekman, and The Essex Green — over three, week-long sessions in Brooklyn from 2008 to 2009. The album was produced by James William Hindle, whose own music has been featured in The O.C., One Tree Hill, and other shows. Musicians featured include, among others, Kevin Barker (Joanna Newsom, Vetiver, and Antony and the Johnsons), Isobel Knowles (Architecture in Helsinki), Kyle Forester (Crystal Stilts), and Eric Farber (Ladybug Transistor). The record also features a spoken word cameo by actor Jesse Eisenberg (The Social Network, The Squid and the Whale).

==== Track listing ====
All tracks are written by Spencer Breslin, except where noted.

No.	Title	Length
1.	"Winter Coat"	3:36
2.	"Bobby of Saratoga"	1:50
3.	"A German in New York" (Breslin, James William Hindle)	4:10
4.	"The Rapture"	2:41
5.	"Rejection Speaks"	4:27
6.	"Opal"	0:55
7.	"The Hammer"	2:40
8.	"Linen Shirt"	2:25
9.	"The Patient" (featuring Jesse Eisenberg)	1:08
10.	"Labor Day"	8:15
11.	"Midwest"	3:22

== Filmography ==
Year	Film	Role	Notes
1997	Soul Man	Fred Weber	3 episodes
1998	Law & Order	Nicholas Waring	TV show; Episode: "Cherished"
1999	Trinity	Little Kid	TV show; Episode: "Patron Saint of Impossible Causes"
1999	Stephen King: Storm of the Century	Donny "The Little Boy" Beals	
2000	Meet the Parents	Little Boy	
2000	Disney's The Kid	Rusty Duritz	
2000	Kenny the Shark	Matt	TV special (live action)
2000	The Ultimate Christmas Present	Joey Thompson	Television film
2001	Robertson's Greatest Hits	Spencer Robertson	Television film
2001	Kate Brasher	Simon Traylor	TV series; Episode: "Simon"
2002	Teamo Supremo	Crandall	Voice
2002	Return to Neverland	Cubby	Voice
2002	Mom's on Strike	Sam Harris	Television film
2002	The Santa Clause 2	Curtis the Elf	
2002–05	Express Yourself	Himself	Interstitial series
2003	You Wish!	Stevie Lansing / Terrence Russell McCormack	Television film
2003	The Cat in the Hat	Conrad Walden	
2004	Raising Helen	Henry Davis	
2004	The Princess Diaries 2: Royal Engagement	Prince Jacques	
2004	Center of the Universe	Miles Barnett	TV series
2004	Wonderfalls	Peter Johnson	Episode: "Lovesick Ass"
2006	Ozzie	Justin Morton	Filmed in 2004, released in 2006
2006	The Shaggy Dog	Josh Douglas	
2006	Zoom	Tucker Williams / Mega-Boy	
2006	The Santa Clause 3: The Escape Clause	Curtis the Elf	
2008	The Happening	Josh	
2008	Harold	Harold Clemens	
2009	Bless this Mess	Doug	Television film
2009	Bones	Clinton Gilmore	Episode: "The Salt in the Wounds"
2010	Quantum Quest: A Cassini Space Odyssey	Anthony	Voice
2011	Born to Race	Max	
2012	Stuck in Love	Jason	
2013	Really Bad Movie!	—N/a	Executive Producer
2014	Perfect Sisters	Cousin Derek	
2015	Some Kind of Hate	Isaac	
2015	Sunshine Becomes You	Alex's Driver	
2016	F**kin' Actors	Spencer	Episode: "The Rush Call"
2018	External Forces	Spencer	Short film
2019	Wickenberg	Joe Davidson Realtor	Short film
2022	Murder, Anyone?	Blain	
2024	Darkness of Man	Chris	
2024	Don't Say It	Mikey	
