= Return to Never Land =

2002 film by Robin Budd

- Theatrical release poster
- Directed by: Robin Budd
- Screenplay by: Temple Mathews
- Based on: When Wendy Grew Up by J. M. Barrie
- Produced by: Christopher Chase; Michelle Pappalardo-Robinson; Dan Rounds
- Starring: Harriet Owen; Blayne Weaver; Corey Burton; Jeff Bennett; Kath Soucie; Andrew McDonough
- Edited by: Anthony F. Rocco
- Music by: Joel McNeely
- Production company: Walt Disney Television Animation (Note: Animation services provided by Walt Disney Animation Australia and Disney MovieToons.)
- Distributed by: Buena Vista Pictures Distribution (Note: Distributed under the Walt Disney Pictures banner.)
- Release dates: February 10, 2002 (El Capitan Theatre); February 15, 2002 (United States)
- Running time: 72 minutes
- Country: United States
- Language: English
- Budget: $20 million
- Box office: $115.1 million

Return to Never Land (also known as Peter Pan: Return to Never Land) is a 2002 American animated adventure fantasy film produced by Walt Disney Television Animation. A sequel to Walt Disney Feature Animation's 1953 film Peter Pan, the film is based on the 1908 play When Wendy Grew Up by J.M. Barrie. It follows Wendy's daughter, Jane, who is mistakenly abducted and brought to Neverland and must learn to believe in order to return home. The film stars the voices of Harriet Owen, Blayne Weaver, Corey Burton, Jeff Bennett, Kath Soucie, Spencer Breslin, and Bradley Pierce.

Return to Never Land premiered at the El Capitan Theatre in Los Angeles, California on February 10, 2002, and was released in the United States in February 15, by Buena Vista Pictures Distribution. Despite receiving mixed reviews from critics, it was a box-office success like its predecessor, grossing $115 million against a $20 million budget.

== Plot ==
Many years after her trip to Neverland, an adult Wendy Darling, who maintains her belief and knowledge of Peter Pan, Tinker Bell and Neverland, is married to a soldier named Edward, and becomes a mother, having two children, Jane and Danny. With World War II raging, Edward leaves his family to fight in the war, leaving Wendy to take care of the children. Jane becomes cynical and, unlike her younger brother, refuses to believe in stories about Peter, Tink and Neverland.

A few years later, on Danny's fourth birthday, Wendy is informed that the children are scheduled for evacuation to the country the following morning. Jane refuses to go and has an argument with her mother and brother. Later that night, Peter's arch-nemesis, Captain Hook, and his pirate crew arrive on his pixie-dust enchanted ship. Mistaking her for Wendy, they abduct her and take her to Neverland and plan to feed her to an octopus to lure Peter into a trap. However, Peter and Tink rescue Jane, and Hook escapes from the disgruntled octopus, taking over the role of the Crocodile, returning to the ship.

After Peter learns that Jane is Wendy's daughter, he takes her to his hideout to be the mother of the Lost Boys as Wendy once was, but Jane refuses. She tries to leave the island by means of a raft, but it sinks, and Peter tells her that the only way to get home is by flying. The following day, the boys fail to teach Jane about flying. Annoyed by their unruly behavior, Jane loses her temper and declares that she does not believe in Neverland, particularly fairies. Her disbelief causes Tink to lose her strength and the fairy's light begins to fade.

Hook, overhearing Jane's longing to return home, plans to use this to his advantage. That night, Hook promises to bring Jane home if she can find the treasure that Peter and the Lost Boys stole, giving her a whistle to signal him when she finds it. Jane asks Peter and the boys to play a game of "treasure hunt", and they teach Jane how to act like a Lost Boy, hoping to get her to believe in fairies and save Tink's life. Jane finds the treasure but changes her mind, discarding the whistle. The boys make her a "Lost Girl", before Tootles finds and blows the whistle, inadvertently alerting the pirates, who capture Peter and the Lost Boys. After Hook lets her go as thanks for "helping" him, Jane tries to convince Peter that it was a misunderstanding, but he accuses her of being a traitor and reveals that her disbelief in fairies is causing Tink's light to fade.

Horrified by her selfish deed, Jane runs back to the hideout to find Tink's lifeless body. Jane is heartbroken, believing her to be dead, but her newfound belief in fairies revives her. They head to the ship and see Hook forcing Peter to walk the plank. With Tink's help, Jane learns to fly. As Peter uses the anchor to sink the ship, the pirates, riding on a rowboat, are chased away by the octopus. After saying goodbye to the boys, Peter escorts Jane back home, where she reconciles with Wendy and Danny. Peter and Tink meet with Wendy again, then fly back to Neverland as Edward returns home and reunites with his family.

== Voice cast ==
- Harriet Owen as Jane Darling, Wendy and Edward's daughter, and Danny's older sister who refuses to believe in stories, but changes her mind with Peter's help. Lianne Hughes served as the supervising animator for Jane.
  - Owen also voices young Wendy Darling.
- Blayne Weaver as Peter Pan, the leader of the Lost Boys, Jane's new friend, Tinker Bell's best friend, and Wendy's former playmate who protects Neverland and its inhabitants. Pieter Lommerse and Andrew Collins served as the supervising animators for Peter Pan.
- Corey Burton as Captain Hook, a pirate captain and Peter Pan's arch-nemesis. Bob Baxter served as the supervising animator for Captain Hook.
- Jeff Bennett as Mr. Smee, Captain Hook's clumsy and innocent first mate and right-hand man.
- Kath Soucie as Wendy Darling, Jane and Danny's mother, Michael and John's older sister, Edward's wife, and Peter's former playmate. Ryan O'Loughlin served as the supervising animator for Wendy. Kathryn Beaumont, who voiced Wendy in the original film, recorded dialogue for the sequel, but Soucie replaced her as Beaumont's voice had aged.
- Andrew McDonough as Daniel, nicknamed Danny, Wendy and Edward's son and Jane's younger brother who believes in his mother's stories of Peter Pan.
- Roger Rees as Edward, a surviving soldier, Wendy's husband, and Jane and Danny's father. Rees would later serve as co-playwright for another Peter Pan project, the stage adaptation of Peter and the Starcatcher.
- The Lost Boys, Peter's best friends:
  - Quinn Beswick as Slightly, a lost boy in a fox costume and Peter's second-in-command.
  - Spencer Breslin as Cubby, a lost boy in a bear costume.
  - Bradley Pierce as Nibs, a lost boy in a rabbit costume.
  - Aaron Spann as the Twins, the lost boys in raccoon costumes.
  - Tootles, a mute lost boy in a skunk costume.
- Frank Welker as Octopus, who seeks to consume Captain Hook and eventually Smee and Hook's Pirate crew, similar to the Crocodile in the original film.
  - Welker also voices Nana II is a military dog and wearing a Brodie helmet during World War I and World War II.
- Clive Revill as Narrator.

== Production ==
The project began as Peter and Jane, a sequel to Peter Pan and intended as the first theatrical release from Disney Animation Canada, who worked on the project until the fall of 1999, when the studio was shut down. Now intended as a direct-to-video release, production on Peter and Jane was moved to Walt Disney Animation Australia and Walt Disney Animation Japan.

In March 2001, Disney announced that the film would revert to a theatrical release due to positive reception from company execs. Cornerstone Animation was then contracted to do animation direction.

Due to the controversy of the first film, the Native Americans are completely absent in the sequel, but it does show their teepees and totem poles in one scene. Also, following these changes, the mermaids are given brassieres since their appearances in the first film were considered sexualized.

A video game based on the film, titled Peter Pan: Adventures in Never Land was released by Sony Computer Entertainment for the PlayStation and Disney Interactive for Windows. An abridged version for the Game Boy Advance was also released the same year.

== Soundtrack ==
Peter Pan in Disney's Return to Never Land

Soundtrack album by Various artists
- Released: February 5, 2002
- Length: 54:06
- Label: Walt Disney
- Producers: Joel McNeely; John Flansburgh

Several original songs were written for the film: "I'll Try" (written and performed by Jonatha Brooke, which is put into three different versions. A short version; sung at the beginning of the film, a reprise; heard towards the film's climax, and a full version; which is used in the end credits), "Here We Go Another Plan" (written by Randy Rogel and performed by Jeff Bennett), and "So to Be One of Us"/"Now that You're One of Us" (written by They Might Be Giants).

The song "Second Star to the Right" from the original film is covered by Jonatha Brooke. The soundtrack also includes a cover of "Do You Believe in Magic?" by BBMak, which also plays over the end credits.

The end title version of "I'll Try" was produced by Stewart Levine.

The score for the film was composed by Joel McNeely.

=== Track listing ===
No.	Title	Performer(s)	Length
1.	"Do You Believe in Magic?"	BBMak	3:00
2.	"Main Title (Score)"	Joel McNeely	2:08
3.	"The Second Star to the Right"	Jonatha Brooke	1:57
4.	"The Tale of Pan (Score)"	Joel McNeely	1:44
5.	"I'll Try"	Jonatha Brooke	4:07
6.	"Jane Is Kidnapped (Score)"	Joel McNeely	3:35
7.	"A Childhood Lost (Score)"	Joel McNeely	2:35
8.	"Here We Go Another Plan"	Jeff Bennett	0:24
9.	"Summoning the Octopus/Pan Saves Jane (Score)"	Joel McNeely	2:41
10.	"Flight Through Never Land (Score)"	Joel McNeely	2:42
11.	"So to Be One of Us"	Blayne Weaver, Harriet Owen, Spencer Breslin, Bradley Pierce, Aaron Spann, The Lost Boys Chorus: Jonnie Hall, D.J. Harper, Nils Montan, Bobbi Page, Wally Wingert, Lauren Wood	1:27
12.	"Meet the Lost Boys (Score)"	Joel McNeely	1:14
13.	"Now that You're One of Us"	Blayne Weaver, Harriet Owen, Spencer Breslin, Bradley Pierce, Aaron Spann, The Lost Boys Chorus: Jonnie Hall, D.J. Harper, Nils Montan, Bobbi Page, Wally Wingert, Lauren Wood	0:38
14.	"Longing for Home (Score)"	Joel McNeely	2:15
15.	"Hook and the Lost Boys (Score)"	Joel McNeely	3:24
16.	"Hook Deceives Jane (Score)"	Joel McNeely	2:56
17.	"Jane Finds the Treasure (Score)"	Joel McNeely	1:59
18.	"Pan Is Captured (Score)"	Joel McNeely	2:17
19.	"I'll Try (Reprise)"	Jonatha Brooke	1:08
20.	"Jane Saves Tink and Pan (Score)"	Joel McNeely	3:29
21.	"Jane Can Fly (Score)"	Joel McNeely	2:36
22.	"Flying Home (Score)"	Joel McNeely	3:29
23.	"Reunion (Score)"	Joel McNeely	2:21

- Note: Track 5 is the full version of “I’ll Try” produced by Stewart Levine. The short version heard in the beginning of the film was not included on the soundtrack.

== Reception ==
=== Box office ===
The film opened at the third position at the box office behind Crossroads and John Q with $11.9 million. Return to Never Land grossed $48.4 million domestically and $66.7 million overseas, for a worldwide gross of $115.1 million, against a production budget of $20 million. It was before DVD sales, which had been the initially planned market for the film.

=== Critical response ===
On review aggregator website Rotten Tomatoes, the film has an approval rating of 46% based on 96 reviews, and an average rating of 5.5/10. The site's critical consensus reads, "With its forgettable songs and lackluster story, this new Pan will surely entertain kids, but will feel more like a retread to adults." On Metacritic, the film has a weighted average score of 49 out of 100, based on 26 critics, indicating "mixed or average reviews". Audiences polled by CinemaScore gave the film an average grade of "A" on an A+ to F scale.

Film critic Roger Ebert gave the film three stars out of four and praised the vocal performances of Burton and Weaver, especially Burton's, though he expressed surprise the movie's songs were not sung by the voice actors. Peter Bradshaw of The Guardian published a negative review by calling the film a "completely uninspired cartoon sequel", dismissing it as a very dull retread of the original film. Nell Minow of Common Sense Media gave the film two stars out of five, saying remarks that it was "pleasant but forgettable sequel to Disney classic."

=== Accolades ===
Breslin was nominated for a 2003 Young Artist Award as Best Performance in a Voice-Over Role at the 24th Young Artist Awards.

== Home media ==
Return to Never Land was released on VHS and DVD on August 20, 2002, and it took in only lukewarm sales. In November 2007, the film was released in a "Pixie-Powered Edition" and was also released in a Peter Pan trilogy, along with the Peter Pan Platinum Edition and Tinker Bell in December 2008.

The film was released on Blu-ray in August 2013, after the first Blu-ray release of Peter Pan. It was reprinted on Blu-ray in June 2018 as a Disney Movie Club Exclusive.

== Video game ==
A tie-in video game, Disney's Peter Pan: Return to Never Land, was released on Game Boy Advance in 2002.
