= Pablo Santos (actor) =

Mexican actor (1987–2006)

- Born: Pablo Alberto Santos Williams; 9 January 1987; Monterrey, Mexico
- Died: 15 September 2006 (aged 19); Toluca, Mexico
- Other name: Pabs
- Occupation: Actor
- Years active: 2000–2006

Pablo Santos (9 January 1987 – 15 September 2006) was a Mexican actor.

== Career ==
Santos was born in Monterrey, Nuevo León. At the age of 12 he moved with his family to Los Angeles, California. He began an acting career and starred as the son of a Mexican-Irish-American family portrayed in Greetings from Tucson, which ran on the WB network from 2002 to 2003.

After the series ended, he appeared in the 2004 film Party Animalz. He also appeared in television shows such as Law & Order: Special Victims Unit and Boston Public.

== Death ==
Santos died on 15 September 2006 in a plane crash at Toluca International Airport in Toluca, west of Mexico City. He was flying as a passenger, seated on the floor with no restraints, in a chartered plane (a Piper PA-46 Malibu) flown by a commercial pilot, from Monterrey to Acapulco with five friends to celebrate Mexican Independence Day when the plane crashed over a mile (1.6 km) short of the runway while the pilot was attempting an emergency landing at an intermediate airport in Toluca due to low fuel levels. Another passenger, Martel Fernández, was declared brain-dead the following day; his life support was terminated. All others on board were hospitalized for minor injuries. The aircraft was certified to carry six persons, including the pilot, and there were six seats in the plane, yet there were seven people on board.

== Filmography ==
- 2006: Gettin' Some Jail Time
- 2006: Walkout
- 2005: Sea of Dreams
- 2005: Shackles
- 2004: Party Animalz
- 2003: Boston Public: Episode 1 "Chapter Sixty Seven" (TV series)
- 2003: The Proud Family (TV series)
- 2002: Law & Order: Special Victims Unit: Episode "Angels" (TV series)
- 2002: Greetings from Tucson (TV series)
- 2002: Cojones
- 2002: Jeremiah: Episode "Red Kiss" (TV series)
- 2002: American Family : Episode "Crash Boom Love" Parts 1 & 2 (TV series)
- 2002: The Shield: Episode "Journey of Dreams" (TV series)
- 2001: Alias: Episode "Doppelgänger" (TV series)
- 2000: The Weeping Woman of the River
- 2000: Resurrection Boulevard: Episode "Comenzando de Nuevo" (TV series)
