= Greetings from Tucson =

American sitcom (2002–2003)

- Also known as: Just Like You; This Time
- Genre: Sitcom
- Created by: Peter Murrieta
- Starring: Julio Oscar Mechoso; Rebecca Creskoff; Jacob Vargas; Pablo Santos; Aimee Garcia; Sara Paxton; Lupe Ontiveros; Bobby Chavez
- Composer: Los Lobos
- Country of origin: United States
- Original language: English
- No. of seasons: 1
- No. of episodes: 22

Production
- Executive producers: Peter Murrieta; Rob LaZebnik; Howard Klein; David Miner
- Camera setup: Multi-camera
- Running time: 21 minutes
- Production companies: Bang.; 3 Arts Entertainment; Big Ticket Television

Original release
- Network: The WB
- Release: September 20, 2002 – May 9, 2003

Greetings from Tucson is an American sitcom television series created by Peter Murrieta, which aired on The WB from September 20, 2002 to May 9, 2003. The series was executive produced by Rob LaZebnik, Peter Murrieta, Howard Klein and David Miner.

Though reviews were mixed, critics applauded the abilities of the mostly-Latino cast, calling the show "a welcome addition to TV's largely white landscape," and compared its premise to I Love Lucy, The Jeffersons and the thought-provoking 1970s comedies of Norman Lear.

== Overview ==
Greetings from Tucson focused on the Tiant family, through the eyes of 15-year-old son David. His father Joaquin was a proud, pragmatic Mexican-American; mother Elizabeth is a feisty, no-nonsense white woman of Irish descent; and older sister Maria is a popular cheerleader. Also around were Joaquin's irresponsible brother Ernesto; Ernesto's son Daniel; Joaquin's mother Magdalena; and David's friend and new neighbor Sarah Tobin.

The series begins six months after Joaquin's promotion at the local copper mine enabled him to move the family to a better neighborhood. Based on the life of series creator Peter Murrieta, the series attempted to examine the themes of cultural identity, family and class. The family's former neighborhood was mentioned to be an impoverished area, where the family home had bars on the windows and was subject to frequent police helicopter flyovers. Stereotypes of Mexican-American culture are lampooned in the series, and used self-deprecatingly.

The show's title was meant to imitate the caption of a postcard, and the title sequence displayed the cast and credits on a series of postcards. The same visual device was used to transition between scenes. The exterior shot of the daughter's apartment building is a photograph of a real Tucson apartment complex, Casa Royale. The show's theme song was performed by Los Lobos.

== Cast ==
=== Main ===
- Julio Oscar Mechoso as Joaquin Tiant, David's father
- Rebecca Creskoff as Elizabeth Tiant, David's mother
- Jacob Vargas as Ernesto Tiant, David's paternal uncle
- Pablo Santos as David Tiant
- Aimee Garcia as Maria Tiant, David's older sister
- Sara Paxton as Sarah Tobin, David's neighbor
- Lupe Ontiveros as Magdalena Tiant, David's paternal grandmother
- Bobby Chavez as Daniel Tiant, David's paternal cousin

=== Recurring ===
- Molly Hagan as Karen Tobin, Sarah's mother
- James Widdoes as Don Tobin, Sarah's father

=== Notable Guest Stars ===
- J.C. Chasez as Jay Dugray
- Carmen Electra as Rosa
- Teri Garr as Helen
- Willie Garson as Mr. Gargan
- Ana Ortiz as Angela
- Martin Mull as Tom
- Joe Regalbuto as Mr. Klein
- Brian Scolaro as Larry Janetti
- Vince Neil as himself

== Episodes ==
No.	Title	Directed by	Written by	Original release date	Prod. code
1	"Pilot"	James Widdoes	Peter Murrieta	September 20, 2002	62031-001
2	"My Two Padres"	Michael Lessac	Michael Begler	September 27, 2002	62031-002
3	"Driving"	James Widdoes	Peter Murrieta & Rob LaZebnik	October 4, 2002	62031-003
4	"Work Ethic"	Michael Lessac	Vince Cheung & Ben Montanio	October 11, 2002	62031-004
5	"Popularity"	Michael Lessac	Richard Goodman	October 18, 2002	62031-005
6	"Spiteful Dating"	Joe Regalbuto	Theresa Mulligan	November 1, 2002	62031-006
7	"Working Mothers of America"	Michael Lessac	Rob LaZebnik & Peter Murrieta	November 8, 2002	62031-007
8	"Strike"	Joe Regalbuto	Vince Cheung & Ben Montanio	November 22, 2002	62031-008
9	"Christmas"	Mark Cendrowski	Erica Rothschild	December 13, 2002	62031-010
10	"Ball and Chain"	Joe Regalbuto	Michael Begler	January 10, 2003	62031-009
11	"A Brand New Car"	Dana De Vally Piazza	Rob LaZebnik & Peter Murrieta	January 17, 2003	62031-011
12	"Counseling"	Joe Regalbuto	Robert Aguilar Jr.	January 24, 2003	62031-012
13	"Family Honor"	Joe Regalbuto	Peter Murrieta	January 31, 2003	62031-013
14	"Maria's Boyfriend"	Joe Regalbuto	Jenna Jolovitz	February 7, 2003	62031-014
15	"Student Council"	Joe Regalbuto	Theresa Mulligan	February 14, 2003	62031-015
16	"Coffee"	Joe Regalbuto	Michael Begler	February 21, 2003	62031-016
17	"The Breakup"	Joe Regalbuto	Vince Cheung & Ben Montanio	April 4, 2003	62031-017
18	"Home Sweet Home"	Joe Regalbuto	Dan Tobin	April 11, 2003	62031-018
19	"My Friend Mom"	Joe Regalbuto	Richard Goodman	April 18, 2003	62031-019
20	"The First Time"	Joe Regalbuto	Theresa Mulligan & Erica Rothschild	April 25, 2003	62031-020
21	"Sibling Rivalry"	Tony Plana	Robert Aguilar Jr.	May 2, 2003	62031-021
22	"Eegee's vs. Hardee's"	Jonathan Schmock	Jenna Jolovitz	May 9, 2003	62031-022
