= Mom's on Strike =

2002 television film directed by James Keach

- Starring: Faith Ford; Tim Matheson; Sarah Gadon; Daniel Magder; Sonja Smits; Spencer Breslin; Florence Henderson
- Original language: English

Production
- Production company: Once Upon a Time Films

Original release
- Network: ABC Family
- Release: March 17, 2002

Mom's on Strike is a television film starring Faith Ford and Tim Matheson. It premiered on ABC Family in March 17, 2002. It was directed by James Keach and written by Nancey Silvers. It is a remake and expansion of a 1984 episode of ABC Afterschool Special also titled "Mom's on Strike".

== Plot ==
When an overworked housewife goes on strike to persuade the rest of her family to share in household chores, she becomes a national celebrity.

== Cast ==
- Faith Ford as Pam Harris
- Tim Matheson as Alan Harris, Pam's husband
- Spencer Breslin as Sam Harris, Pam & Alan's second son
- Florence Henderson as Betty
- Sarah Gadon as Jessica Harris, Pam & Alan's daughter
- Daniel Magder as A.J. Harris, Pam & Alan's first son
- Sonja Smits as First Lady
