= Hallee Hirsh =

American actress (born 1987 or 1988)

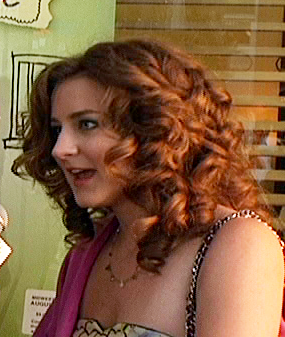
- Hirsh in 2009
- Born: Hallee Leah Hirsh; December 16, 1987 (age 38); Omaha, Nebraska, U.S.
- Education: UCLA
- Occupation: Actress
- Years active: 1993–present
- Spouse: Ryan Martin (m. 2013)
- Children: 2

Hallee Leah Hirsh (born December 16, 1987) is an American actress known for her roles as Mattie Grace Johnson on JAG, Daley in the children's series Flight 29 Down, and as the adolescent and young adult Rachel Greene on ER.

== Early life ==
Hirsh began acting when she was three, with her older brother Greg.

Hirsh and her family moved frequently, first to Pensacola, Florida, where Hirsh landed her first role after her first audition in Orlando for Disney's Big Red Boat cruise line. When she was four, her mother was transferred to Long Island. Hirsh began taking the train into Manhattan after school to audition almost daily, landing roles such as Annabel Fox in You've Got Mail.

After her agent, Abby Bluestone, moved to Los Angeles, 11-year-old Hirsh and her family followed. Her mother was stationed in Monterey, California during this time. Hirsh lived with her father in the Oakwood Toluca Hills apartment complex, alongside other notable child stars such as Hilary Duff, a time which she has referred to as "an important part of her life". She graduated magna cum laude from UCLA in 2011, majoring in anthropology and minoring in Chinese.

== Career ==
Hirsh first portrayed Rachel Greene in the eighth season (2001–02) of ER in a storyline where a now teenage and rebellious Rachel leaves her mother in St. Louis to be with her father, Mark Greene; the character returns to St. Louis when Mark dies that season. Hirsh later reprised her role in 2004 in the season 10 episode "Midnight", visiting her stepmother Dr. Elizabeth Corday. In the ER series finale, aired April 2, 2009, titled "And in the End", Hirsh's character returned as a candidate interviewing for medical school, bringing the Greene family history full circle.

Following her one main season on ER, Hirsh appeared in the recurring role of Matilda "Mattie" Grace Johnson, for 17 episodes (2003–05) on the television series JAG. Hirsh next starred in the Discovery Kids Channel teen series, Flight 29 Down.

Hirsh was nominated for Best Comedic Actress in a Feature Film at the 2009 Method Fest film festival for her work in 16 to Life and won Best Actress for same role and film at both the 2010 Tunis International Film Festival and the 2010 Alaska International Film Festival.

Hirsh has not been active in film or television since 2014, with one subsequent credit in the film Chasing The Rain in 2020.

== Personal life ==
Hirsh married Ryan Martin in 2013 and they have two sons, born in May 2014 and December 2018. At the end of 2014, the family relocated from Los Angeles to Asheville, North Carolina, where they operate Hole Doughnuts, a doughnut shop which received recognition from Bon Appétit magazine for "Dessert of the Year" in 2016.

== Filmography ==
=== Film ===
Year	Title	Role	Notes
1997	Lolita	Little Girl in Bunny Suit	
1997	Norville and Trudy	Bobbie Kockenlocker	
1998	One True Thing	Ellen Gulden (age 8)	
1998	You've Got Mail	Annabel Fox	
2000	Spring Forward	Hope	
2000	Joe Gould's Secret	Nora Mitchell	
2002	Manna from Heaven	Young Theresa	
2004	Speak	Rachel Bruin	
2005	Happy Endings	Mamie Toll (age 17)	
2006	Wild Hearts	Madison Hart	
2008	Fading of the Cries	Sarah	
2009	Make the Yuletide Gay	Abby Mancuso	
2009	16 to Life	Kate	
2013	Bad Behavior	Zoe	
2014	Infiltrators	Micki Thorne	
2020	Chasing the Rain	Vanessa	

=== Television ===
Year	Title	Role	Notes
1993	Late Night with Conan O'Brien	Various	"1.11"
1993–1995	Loving	Heather Rose Forbes	TV series Unknown episodes
1994	Saturday Night Live	Caroline Giuliani / Little Girl	"Nancy Kerrigan/Aretha Franklin"
1996	All My Children		1 episode
1996	As the World Turns	Annie Hasbrook	TV series Unknown episodes
1997	What the Deaf Man Heard	Young Tallasse	TV film
1998	Saint Maybe	Young Agatha	TV film
1998	Carson's Vertical Suburbia	Penelope	TV film
1998	Law & Order	Gillian Lanetti	"Grief"
1999	Law & Order	Jenny Brandt	"Killerz"
1999	LateLine	Jennifer Karp	"Kids 'N' Guns"
1999	The Snooker Report	Shanna Levine	TV series
2000	Malcolm in the Middle	Jessica	"Traffic Jam"
2000	The Ultimate Christmas Present	Allison "Allie" Rachel Thompson	TV film
2000	Judging Amy	Jodi Larson Pruitt	"Shaken, Not Stirred", "Dog Days"
2001	Family Law	Katie Pollack	"Obligations"
2001	Taking Back Our Town	Catherine Melancon	TV film
2001	The Gene Pool	Dina Fineman	TV film
2001–2009	ER	Rachel Greene	Recurring role
2002	My Sister's Keeper	Young Judy Chapman	TV film
2002	The American Embassy	Liv Faulkner	"Pilot"
2002	The Young and the Restless	Abby	1 episode
2002	The Guardian	Andrea Caffey	"The Innocent"
2003–2005	JAG	Mattie Grace Johnson	Recurring role
2004	Six Feet Under	Kaitlin Stolte	"Parallel Play"
2004	Will & Grace	Olivia Walker	"Christmas Break"
2005	Nip/Tuck	Madison Berg	"Madison Berg"
2005–2007	Flight 29 Down	Daley Marin	Main role
2006	Grey's Anatomy	Claire	"Deterioration of the Fight or Flight Response", "Losing My Religion"
2006	Wild Hearts	Madison	TV film
2006	Without a Trace	Malia Norton	"All for One"
2007	Boston Legal	Michelle Cabot-Levinson	"Selling Sickness"
2007	Flight 29 Down: The Hotel Tango	Daley Marin	TV film
2007	Cold Case	Tina Quinn (1998)	"That Woman"
2008	Ghost Whisperer	Amy Benton	"Home But Not Alone"
2008	Saving Grace	Sophie Ward	"It's a Fierce, White-Hot, Mighty Love"
2008	90210	Hannah Zuckerman-Vasquez	"We're Not in Kansas Anymore"
2009	Criminal Minds	Carol	"Cradle to Grave"
2009	Private Practice	Melissa	"The Hard Part"
2011	SAM: A Puppy, Toothbrush & Frying Pan	Pretty Lady	Video short
2012–2014	Sloppy Tacos	Berri	Recurring role
2013	Hidden Away	Amy	TV film
