= Sportsmen's Lodge =

Hotel located in Los Angeles, California

Coordinates: 34°08′44″N 118°24′45″W

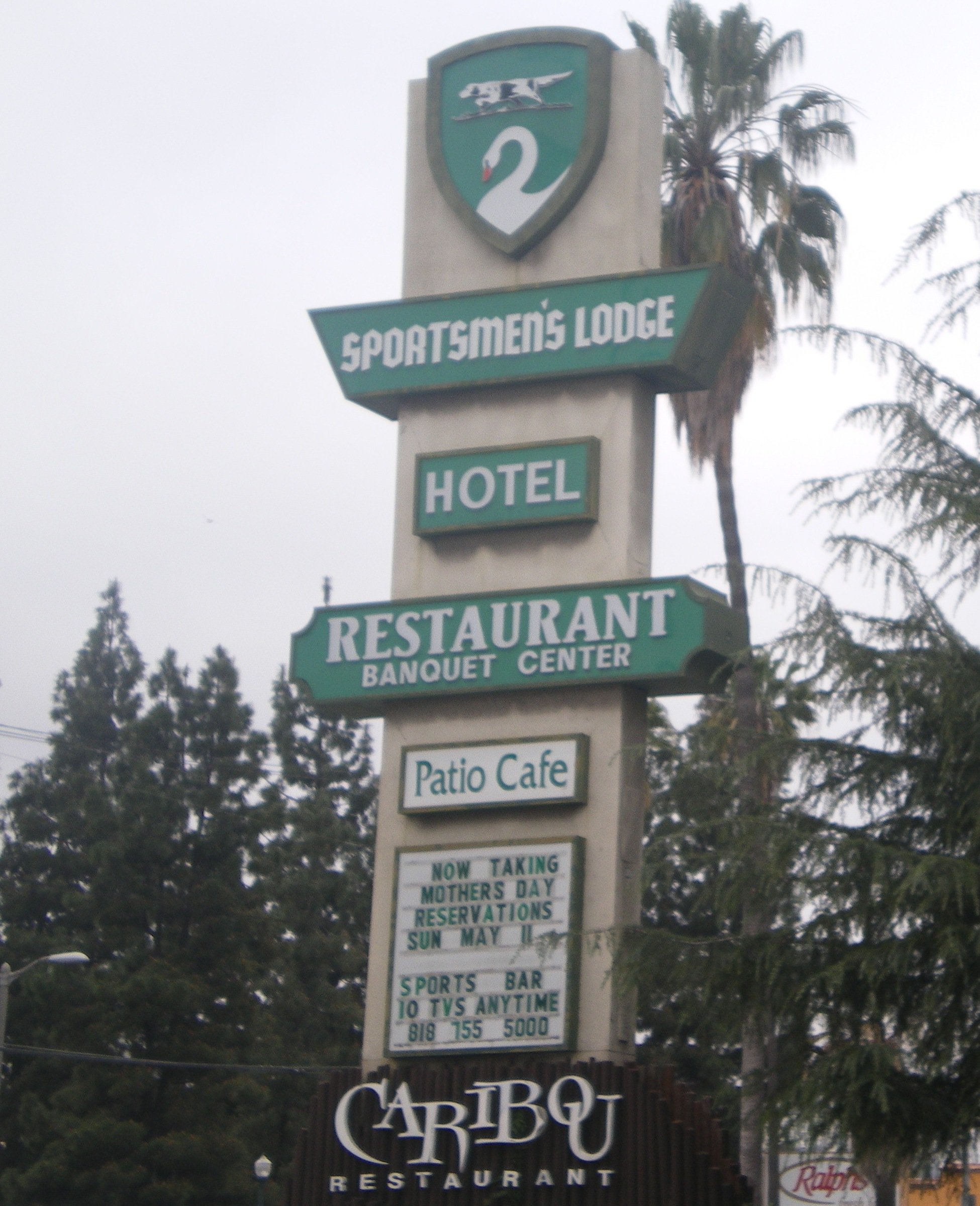

General information
- Location: 12825 Ventura Blvd, Studio City, California, U.S.
- Opened: c. 1880s 1945 (as Sportsmen's Lodge)
- Closed: July 24, 2020; 6 years ago
- Owner: Midwood Investment & Development

Technical details
- Floor count: 5

The Sportsmen's Lodge is a hotel located on Ventura Boulevard in Studio City, Los Angeles, California. Operating under various names (including "Hollywood Trout Farms") since the 1880s, the Sportsmen's Lodge is a San Fernando Valley landmark and long remained a popular spot for celebrations, dinners and public events. Located in the heart of the Valley's studio district, the Sportsmen's Lodge was a popular gathering spot for cast and crew in old Hollywood, including Clark Gable, Bette Davis, John Wayne, Gary Cooper, Ava Gardner, Humphrey Bogart, Lauren Bacall, Spencer Tracy and Katharine Hepburn.

== Early days ==
The original Sportsmen's Lodge opened in the 1880s before the movie business existed and before Studio City had its name. A history of Studio City published by the Studio City Sun describes the Lodge as an "enduring symbol of lost rural Valley life." The Sun notes that the site has had many owners since the 1880s but was "always a geographic crossroads for travelers because of its proximity to the river, the canyons, and watering holes created by a natural artesian spring." In the days before freeways were built across the Valley, "all traffic passed along Ventura Boulevard’s two dirt lanes in the sparsely populated Valley, and 'when people were starting to take road trips, this was an oasis at the end of the road.'"

In the first half of the 20th century, the Sportsmen's Lodge was known for its trout-fishing lake where families came to catch and eat their own dinners, cooked courtesy of the lodge's restaurant. In the 1910s, the Lodge was called "Hollywood Trout Farms" and was described as "a ramshackle collection of huts." The ponds were augmented with man-made lakes in the 1920s, and fish were grown and delivered from as far as Las Vegas and San Luis Obispo. From the late 1930s until the end of World War II, it was known as "Trout Lakes".

== Hollywood hangout ==
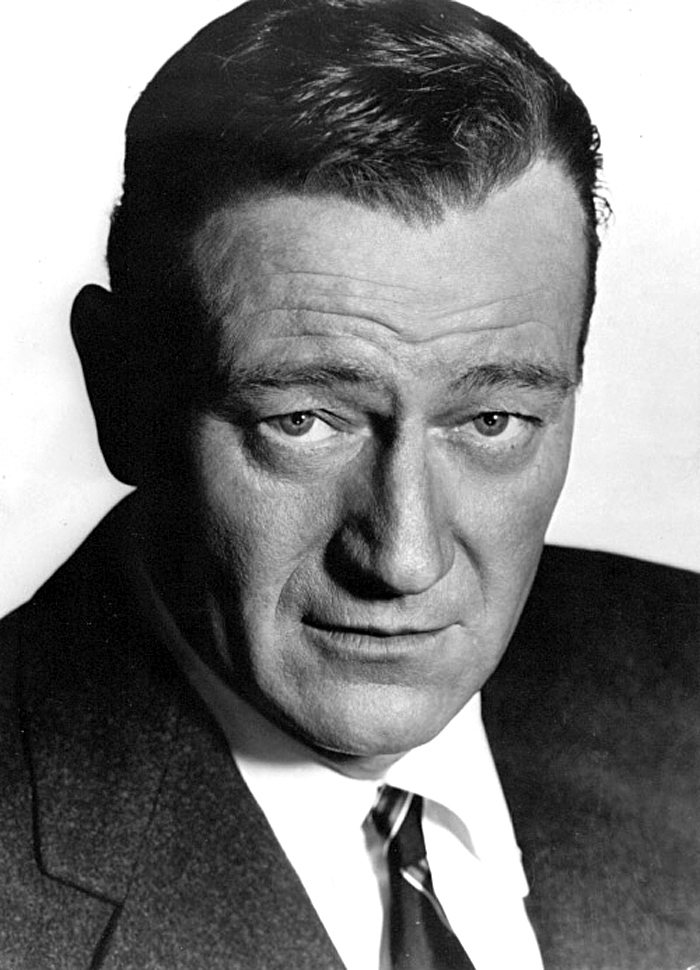
John Wayne taught his kids to fish at the Lodge's trout ponds

The Sportsmen's Lodge became the place to hang out for cast and crew members working at the nearby Republic Studios. The heart of Republic Studios was its B-westerns, and many western-film leads, including John Wayne, Gene Autry, Rex Allen, and Roy Rogers, became stars at Republic. Movie posters signed by Hollywood cowboys who stayed there still hang on the walls of the Lodge's coffee shop. Some of Hollywood's silver screen cowboys long gathered at the Sportsmen's Lodge for the annual Golden Boot and Silver Spur Awards.

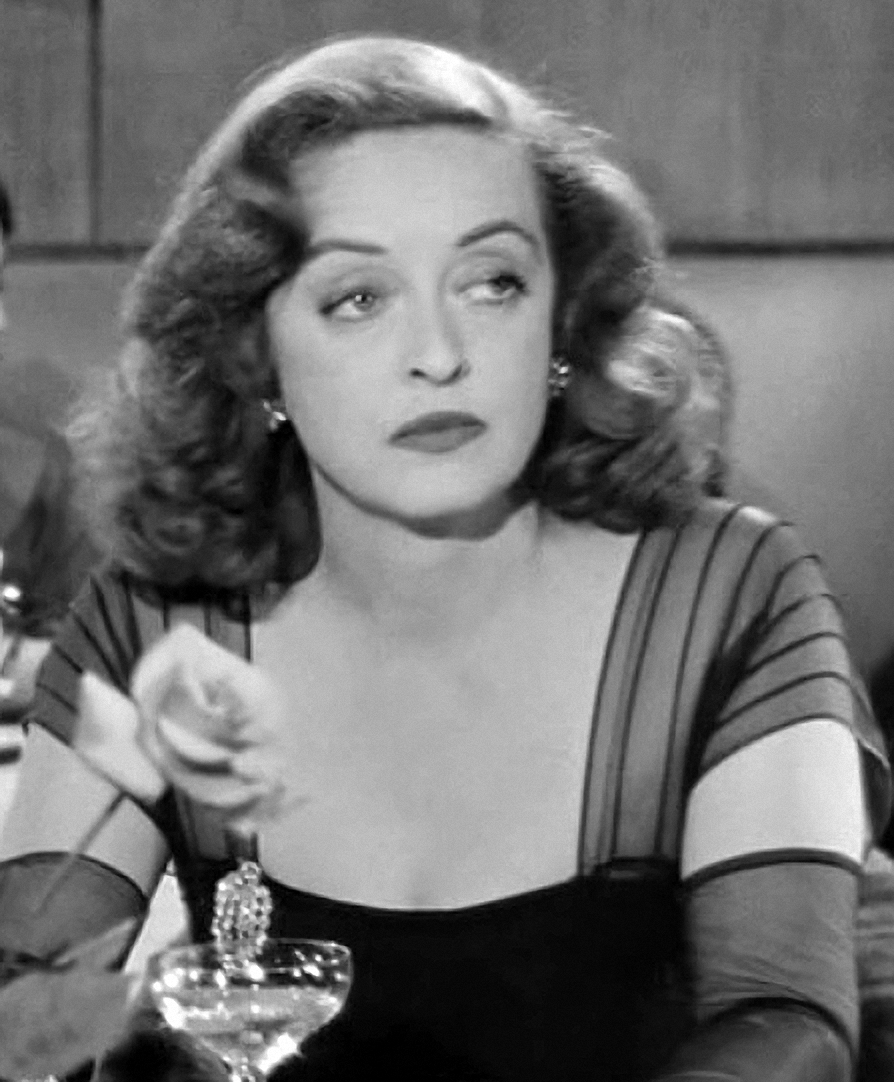
Bette Davis baited hooks with liverwurst and drank martinis at the Lodge

In 1945, the property was renamed the Sportsmen's Lodge, and a formal restaurant and cocktail lounge were added. Guests were given rods and bait to catch their fish and make dinner. Clark Gable, Humphrey Bogart, Bette Davis and John Wayne are reported to have taught their kids how to fish at the Lodge's trout ponds. According to one account, the Lodge's trout ponds "drew luminaries such as Tallulah Bankhead, Lena Horne, Bette Davis, and Joan Blondell, who baited hooks with liverwurst and drank martinis as waiters served dinner on white tablecloths. When celebrities such as Clark Gable frequented the Lodge, rates were $9 for a single room and $25 for a suite.

A small pier adjacent to the restaurant catered to celebrities who worked in nearby studios. The pier was said to be Clark Gable's favorite fishing spot, and Humphrey Bogart and Lauren Bacall were regulars.

Syndicated entertainment columnist Ron Miller wrote that the "venerable" Sportsmen's Lodge was his favorite Valley hangout. Miller wrote about the old days at the Lodge when character actor Jack Elam had a luxury suite on the top floor while working on the movie "Easy Street". Miller recalled that Elam was a drinking man and "mornings were not his best time." On one occasion, Elam walked into the Lodge's coffee shop with a bewildered look on his face. "He'd forgotten where he'd parked his car the night before because he'd had a snootful. I remember him telling the waitresses he was pretty sure it was parked, 'Somewhere in the valley.'" According to Miller, one "well-seasoned" waitress coddled Elam through breakfast and assured him: "That's all right, Darlin'. We'll help you find it after breakfast. Now you'd better eat something, Jack."

As the San Fernando Valley grew in the years after World War II, the urban sprawl sprung up around the Sportsmen's Lodge and its trout fishing lakes. In 1962, the modern Sportsmen's Lodge Hotel was built adjacent to the original lodge. When the hotel was built, the lakes became home to a family of swans and some of the Valley's first fine dining establishments, frequented by legendary Hollywood stars.

According to the Studio City Sun, the Los Angeles Health Department ended the era of fishing at the Lodge when the 1971 San Fernando earthquake diverted the natural spring.

== Connections to the entertainment business ==
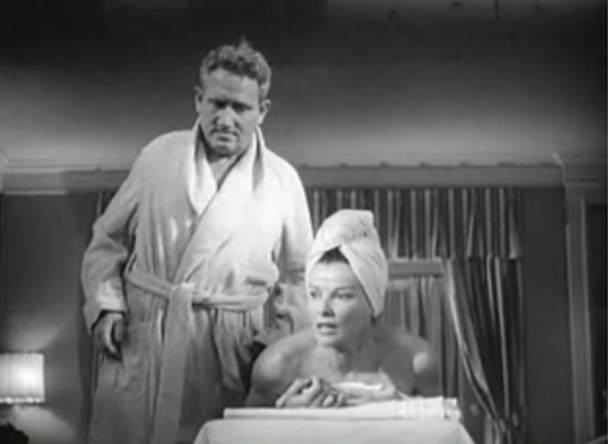
Spencer Tracy and Katharine Hepburn were frequent guests at the Lodge

The Sportsmen's Lodge had a long history of celebrity guests. In a 2007 article on "Where the A-listers lay low," Newscorp described the Sportsmen's Lodge as "a pleasant and unpretentious establishment." General manager Steve Scheck noted, "There are always some stars who need to stay at the most expensive, fanciest places, but others just want to be comfortable, relaxed and feel at home." Spencer Tracy and Katharine Hepburn were visitors, and former Beach Boy Brian Wilson reportedly liked to lounge by the Olympic pool. Other celebrities known to have stayed or hung out at the Sportsmen's Lodge include Marlon Brando, Doris Day, Gene Autry, Tim McGraw, David Lee Roth, Billy Bob Thornton, Randy Travis, and Trisha Yearwood.

For several years, noted salsa promoter Albert Torres operated a salsa club at the Sportsmen's Lodge that was frequented by celebrities including Vanessa L. Williams and Randa Haines.

== Later years and closure ==
The Sportsmen's Lodge remained a popular location for events, dining and lodging. Motion pictures and TV shows were occasionally shot around the waterfalls, lagoons, lily ponds, swans and gazebos, and recording stars and their entire road crews would regularly stay. One writer noted of the Lodge: "It's unexpected, finding a mountain chalet bar complete with massive stone fireplace, antique wooden snow-skis, log-beamed ceilings, and moose antlers here in the midst of strip malls and suburbia. But this is Hollywood's back yard, why not enjoy a hunting lodge right off Ventura Boulevard?"

According to Los Angeles City Search, the hotel "isn't nearly as fun as it once was, [but] it's still a peaceful place with lots of character." The hotel underwent renovations, a process that one writer said "robbed it of some of its goofy charm." Nevertheless, the spacious rooms overlooking an Olympic-size heated pool in the courtyard, the old-fashioned Patio Cafe and neighboring Caribou restaurant and Muddy Moose Bar remained popular. LosAngeles.com said, "This contemporary Los Angeles hotel sits on 8 acres (32,000 m^{2}) of gorgeous landscaped grounds, featuring waterfalls, California native plants and beautiful wildlife, including swans and other waterbirds. Tons of celebrities ... and top execs in the entertainment industry have frequented this luxurious Studio City hotel."

The Sportsmen's Lodge closed to the public in early 2020 as a result of the COVID-19 pandemic. It was used to shelter unhoused residents with the state's Project Roomkey project until July 24, 2020, when it permanently closed.

== Efforts to secure historical site designation ==
In the early 2000s, efforts were taken to secure protected historical status for the Sportsmen's Lodge. In 2002, the Studio City Residents Association, backed by the Los Angeles Conservancy, submitted an application to designate the Lodge's banquet center as a Historic-Cultural Monument. The Conservancy featured the Sportsmen's Lodge as one of just a handful of docent-led stops on its driving tours of the San Fernando Valley—an event that attracted 1,000 tour-goers and won national media attention.

The Cultural Heritage Commission approved the historic designation and sent it on to the Los Angeles City Council. However, the proposal was opposed by City Councilman Jack Weiss, who said that "he does not know anyone who considers Sportsmens Lodge to be significant." The Conservancy responded to Weiss by noting that the Sportsmen's Lodge, "while not an architectural wonder, has long been considered a site that epitomizes the story of the San Fernando Valley itself -- as a site whose evolving uses, from rural to urban, mirrored the Valley's growth; as a roadside attraction to the Valley's vibrant automobile culture; as one of the Valley's earliest and most significant 'fine dining' locations; and as a site that has reflected this community's unique connection to the entertainment industry." Efforts to obtain some protected status for the Lodge are ongoing.

== Redevelopment plans ==
In 2021, Midwood Investment and Development, the owners of Sportsmen's Lodge, announced plans to demolish the hotel and build a 520 unit apartment complex in its place with additional retail to complement the Shops at Sportsmen's Lodge.

== External sources ==
- Official website
