= Disappear Fear discography =

- Studio albums: 10
- Live albums: 3
- Compilation albums: 1
- Video albums: 2

The discography of Disappear Fear (stylized as disappear fear), a Baltimore, Maryland-based indie folk band consists of ten studio albums, three live albums, one compilation album and two video albums. Their discography spans over a thirty-year career (1987–present).

== Overview ==
Disappear Fear was formed in 1987 by sisters, Sonia Rutstein (SONiA) and Cindy Frank (CiNDY). Their first album (Echo My Call) was released under their own Disappear Records label in 1988. Their latest album (Get Your Phil) was released in 2011. This discography is inclusive as to the bands following incarnations: Disappear Fear, Sonia (Rutstein's solo career) and Sonia & Disappear Fear.

== Albums ==
=== Studio albums ===
Disappear Fear

Year	Album details
1988	Echo My Call: Released: October 30, 1988; Label: Disappear Records; Formats: CD, CS, LP
1990	Deep Soul Diver: Released: October 18, 1990; Reissued: April 18, 1995; Label: Disappear Records, Rounder/Philo Records (reissue); Formats: CD, CS, LP
1994	Disappear Fear: Released: June 13, 1994; Label: Rounder/Philo Records; Formats: CD, CS
1996	Seed in the Sahara: Released: June 18, 1996; Label: Rounder/Philo Records; Formats: CD, CS
2011	Get Your Phil: Released: July 4, 2011; Phil Ochs tribute album; Label: Disappear Records; Formats: CD

Sonia

Year	Album details
1998	Almost Chocolate: Released: January 13, 1998; Label: Rounder/Philo Records; Formats: CD, CS
1999	Me, Too: Released: September 7, 1999; Label: Disappear Records; Formats: CD, CS
2004	No Bomb Is Smart: Released: April 25, 2004; Label: Disappear Records; Formats: CD

Sonia & Disappear Fear

Year	Album details
2007	Tango: Released: October 2, 2007; Label: Disappear Records; Formats: CD
2010	Blood, Bones & Baltimore: Released: March 9, 2010; Label: Disappear Records; Formats: CD

SONiA disappear fear

Year	Album details
2019	By My Silence: Released: January 15, 2019; Label: Disappear Records; Formats: CD

=== Live albums ===
Disappear Fear

Year	Album details
1994	Live at the Bottom Line: Released: July 26, 1994; Reissued: May 16, 1995; Labels: Disappear Records, Rounder/Philo Records (reissue); Formats: CD, CS

Sonia

Year	Album details
2001	Live at the Down Home: Released: August 14, 2001; Label: Winthrop Records; Formats: CD

Sonia & Disappear Fear

Year	Album details
2005	DF 05 Live: Released: October 18, 2005; 1st overall album as Sonia & Disappear Fear; Label: Disappear Records; Formats: CD

SONiA disappear fear

Year	Album details
2016	LiVE at MAXiMAL: Released: April 7, 2016; Label: Disappear Records; Formats: CD

=== Compilations ===
Sonia & Disappear Fear

Year	Album details
2009	Splash: Released: January 16, 2009; Retrospective album spanning all prior band incarnations; Labels: Disappear Records, Rounder/Philo Records; Formats: CD

=== Videos ===
Sonia

Year	Video details
2005	Happy Birthday Sonia: A Film of a Musical Journey: Director: Harry Keates; Released: February 18, 2005; Format: DVD
2011	Who I Am: Directors: Matthew Perry, John Densmore, Heinz Habert; Released: March 1, 2011; Format: DVD
