= The New Batman Adventures =

American animated superhero TV series (1997–1999)

- Genre: Superhero; Action; Adventure; Mystery; Thriller
- Created by: Paul Dini; Bruce Timm; Alan Burnett
- Based on: Batman by: Bob Kane; Bill Finger (uncredited)
- Written by: Stan Berkowitz; Alan Burnett; Paul Dini; Rich Fogel
- Directed by: Andrea Romano (voice director)
- Voices of: Kevin Conroy; Tara Strong; Mathew Valencia; Loren Lester; Efrem Zimbalist Jr.; Bob Hastings; Robert Costanzo; Mark Hamill; Arleen Sorkin
- Composers: Shirley Walker; Lolita Ritmanis; Michael McCuistion; Kristopher Carter
- Country of origin: United States
- Original language: English
- No. of seasons: 1
- No. of episodes: 24

Production
- Executive producer: Jean MacCurdy
- Producers: Alan Burnett; Paul Dini; Bruce Timm
- Running time: 22 minutes
- Production companies: Warner Bros. Family Entertainment; Warner Bros. Television Animation

Original release
- Network: Kids' WB
- Release: September 13, 1997 – January 16, 1999

Related
- Batman: The Animated Series; Batman Beyond; Gotham Girls; DC Animated Universe television series

The New Batman Adventures (often shortened as TNBA) is an American animated superhero television series based on the DC Comics superhero Batman, which aired on Kids' WB from September 13, 1997, to January 16, 1999. Produced by Warner Bros. Television Animation, it is a continuation of Batman: The Animated Series (1992–1995), serving as the series' third and final season and the third series in the DC Animated Universe. It was followed by Batman Beyond (1999–2001). The series was revamped from BTAS, replacing its art style with streamlined designs to allow for more consistent animation and maintain similarity with the simultaneously running Superman: The Animated Series (1996–2000), with episodes airing on Kids' WB under the title The New Batman/Superman Adventures.

Stories in this series tend to give more focus to Batman's supporting characters, which include fellow crimefighters Robin, Nightwing and Batgirl, among others. The series additionally features guest characters such as Supergirl, Etrigan the Demon and The Creeper, characters who would later appear with Batman in Justice League and Justice League Unlimited. The 2001 video game Batman: Vengeance and its 2003 follow-up Batman: Rise of Sin Tzu are based on this series.

== Overview ==
The New Batman Adventures premiered on Kids' WB two years after Batman: The Animated Series ended its original run on Fox Kids. While working on Superman: The Animated Series, the network approached the creative team asking them if they could do more episodes of Batman, which would air alongside Superman. To freshen the look of the new show, the art style was revamped from Batman: The Animated Series for more consistent and fluid animation, as well as to keep similarity with Superman: The Animated Series. The show also had a significant change in focus from the original series, with episodes focusing less on Batman and more on the many characters that inhabited Gotham City.

== Production ==
Promotional logo

Batman was given a sleeker, brawnier appearance with an overall darker costume: the yellow ellipse surrounding the bat emblem on his chest and the blue highlights of his cape and cowl were both removed and his utility belt has pouches instead of capsules and is now light brown instead of yellow, which resembles his appearance in Batman: Year One. His gadgets and vehicles were given a sleeker, redesigned look with a dark color scheme. Bruce Wayne's appearance was also changed from the previous series: his hair was brushed back to highlight his face, with blue eyes instead of black, and his regular business suit was changed from brown to black. Kevin Conroy's voice for Batman became more stern, as well as less distinguishable from his voice for Bruce than in the original series. The writers made an effort to keep Batman's dialogue terse and grim to heighten the contrast between him and the lighthearted supporting cast; this also highlighted his character change from the original series.

Batgirl's costume was changed to a look similar to her original outfit from her comic debut in Detective Comics #359 and in her appearance in the Silver Age of comics, which is now a black bodysuit with yellow gloves and boots, but keeps her blue cape and cowl and yellow bat-symbol and utility belt. Her father Commissioner Gordon's appearance was also altered, with a more slender build and a flat-top hairstyle. Producer Paul Dini said that Batgirl would appear in every episode of the new series because "Kenner wants to do a line of toys, we're taking advantage of the publicity from her being in Batman & Robin, and we just love Batgirl". In addition, Melissa Gilbert was recast with Tara Strong (credited under her maiden name Tara Charendoff) as the voice of Batgirl, as the creative team wanted a younger-sounding voice. While Batgirl did not appear in every episode, she did appear more often than Batman's other partners in the series. She also was Batman's main partner in the series rather than Robin, which differs the series from most Batman television series and in the comics (as Robin is usually Batman's main partner). Unlike the Animated Series, in this iteration Batgirl is from the outset now aware of Batman, Robin and Nightwing’s identities, and they of hers. A flashback sequence in Episode 18, "Old Wounds", explains how this came about.

Tim Drake was introduced as the new Robin in the episode "Sins of the Father". However, Dini remarked that "the Tim Drake origin in the comics as written now didn't work for us with him having a father and living so close to Wayne Manor. It seemed to work fine in the comics, but we needed our own little family unit of Batman, Robin, Batgirl and occasionally Nightwing – and Alfred of course". For these reasons, the production team came up with their own origin for Tim Drake, though they later realized this new origin was extremely similar to Jason Todd. Dini and Timm later revealed that the new Robin was always intended to have Jason's origin story and characteristics of both Jason and Tim. The decision to implement some of Todd's characteristics on Drake came up after Timm and Dini decided to not adapt the violent "Batman: A Death in the Family" comic book storyline for the show. Batman made a new suit which is similar to the first one worn by Dick Grayson and identical to Tim Drake's original Robin costume from the comics, but the color scheme was simplified to red, black and yellow, eliminating green entirely. The costume retained the familiar red short-sleeved shirt, as well as the black cape with yellow inner lining. New elements included black sleeves, gloves, trunks and boots with red leggings. The familiar domino mask had also changed, giving the new Robin a more wide-eyed, innocent look. The color scheme would later appear as Tim Drake's Robin costume in the post-Infinite Crisis comics, while the original costume worn by Dick Grayson was seen in the episodes "Old Wounds" and "Over the Edge".

Dick Grayson, having abandoned his Robin persona as a result of a falling out with Batman, adopted the identity of Nightwing. Grayson's build became sleeker, with broader shoulders, showcasing his emergence as a mature hero in his own right. The short spiky hair that Grayson wore as Robin had grown longer, styled to flow down the back of the neck. In his civilian guise, he wore it in a ponytail. As Nightwing, he wore a V-shaped mask and an all-black unitard with light blue hawk emblem that borrowed some elements of the comics version from the 1990s. The costume also featured collapsible wings under the arms that allowed Nightwing to glide for short distances.

The designs of most of the villains from Batman's rogues' gallery were also redesigned, some more so than others. The Joker was redesigned to have white eyes with black sclera and a purple and green suit. However, this was not well-received by fans, and this led to him being redesigned again for Batman Beyond: Return of the Joker (2000), Static Shock (2002) and Justice League (2002–04), where his appearance was a mix of his look from the original series and this one.

Catwoman's redesign now sported an all-black bodysuit (similar to her appearance from Batman Returns) and her hair is changed from blonde and shoulder-length to short and black while keeping her green eyes, matching her appearance in the comics. The Penguin's redesign resembled his appearance from the Golden Age and Silver Age comics instead of having the animal-like appearance from Batman Returns. The Riddler's redesign now sported a green bodysuit with a question mark in the center and his domino mask and red hair are removed, while his bowler hat is retained. The Scarecrow was redesigned to have long black hair, a zombie-like face, and a dark preacher-like outfit. Henry Polic II was recast with Jeffrey Combs as the voice of the Scarecrow. Mr. Freeze now has a dark suit, no goggles, and red eyes with black sclera. Poison Ivy's appearance also changed, her skin tone is chalk white and her costume is now black with leaf-green highlights. Bane's redesign outfit is completely black with silver accents and his mask no longer has red lenses. Killer Croc received a major redesign with a more reptilian appearance, with Brooks Gardner replacing Aron Kincaid in the role.

Harley Quinn, Two-Face, Clayface, Alfred Pennyworth, and Harvey Bullock were among the few characters who did not receive any drastic change in appearance or color alterations. Harley Quinn is also the only villain aside from the Joker who appeared in six or more episodes. Ra's al Ghul and his daughter Talia also did not receive any drastic re-designs, although their only appearance during this time was in the episode "The Demon Reborn" from Superman: The Animated Series.

Koko Enterprise Co., LTD., TMS-Kyokuchi Corporation, and Dong Yang Animation Co., LTD contributed some of the animation for this series.

The Kids' WB censors were much more flexible with episode content than the Fox Kids censors were with Batman: The Animated Series. Producer Bruce Timm recounted that "when we were at Fox, after every single storyboard, we would get five single-spaced pages of notes on things we couldn't do. On the WB, we usually get maybe two paragraphs of stuff we can't do. At Fox, they were really picky, not just about things you couldn't do, but just in terms of content and story. They had a million opinions about what we should be doing. Nobody bothers us like that at the WB".

== Cast ==
=== Protagonists ===
| Actor | Role |
|---|---|
| Kevin Conroy | Bruce Wayne / Batman |
| Tara Strong | Barbara Gordon / Batgirl (credited as Tara Charendoff) |
| Mathew Valencia | Tim Drake / Robin |
| Loren Lester | Dick Grayson / Nightwing |
| Efrem Zimbalist Jr. | Alfred Pennyworth |
| Bob Hastings | Commissioner James Gordon |
| Robert Costanzo | Detective Harvey Bullock |

=== Supporting protagonists ===
| Actor | Role |
|---|---|
| Jeff Bennett | Jack Ryder / The Creeper |
| Liane Schirmer | Renee Montoya |
| Mel Winkler | Lucius Fox |
| Lloyd Bochner | Mayor Hamilton Hill |
| Marilu Henner | Veronica Vreeland |
| Suzanne Stone | Joan Leland |
| Billy Zane | Jason Blood / Etrigan the Demon |
| Nicholle Tom | Kara In-Ze / Kara Kent / Supergirl |

=== Antagonists ===
| Actor | Role |
|---|---|
| Mark Hamill | The Joker |
| Arleen Sorkin | Dr. Harleen Quinzel / Harley Quinn |
| Paul Williams | Oswald Chesterfield Cobblepot / The Penguin |
| Richard Moll | Harvey Dent / Two-Face |
| Adrienne Barbeau | Selina Kyle / Catwoman |
| Diane Pershing | Dr. Pamela Isley / Poison Ivy |
| Jeffrey Combs | Dr. Jonathan Crane / The Scarecrow |
| John Glover | Edward Nygma / The Riddler |
| Michael Ansara | Dr. Victor Fries / Mr. Freeze |
| Brooks Gardner | Waylon Jones / Killer Croc |
| Roddy McDowall | Dr. Jervis Tetch / The Mad Hatter |
| Ron Perlman | Matt Hagen / Clayface |
| George Dzundza | Arnold Wesker / The Ventriloquist |
| Mark Rolston | Garfield Lynns / Firefly |

=== Supporting antagonists ===
| Actor | Role |
|---|---|
| Peter Breck | Farmer Brown |
| Charity James | Roxanne Sutton / Roxy Rocket |
| Laraine Newman | Mary Dahl / Baby Doll |
| Lori Petty | Leslie Willis / Livewire |
| Stephen Wolfe Smith | Klarion the Witch Boy |
| Henry Silva | Bane |
| Sela Ward | Page Monroe / Calendar Girl |

== Episodes ==
| No. | Title | Directed by | Written by | Original release date |
|---|---|---|---|---|
| 1 | "Holiday Knights" | Dan Riba | Paul Dini | September 13, 1997 |
Three holiday-themed vignettes: 1) On December 22, Harley Quinn and Poison Ivy are staying in a hotel when they become depressed over their financial situation. They decide to brainwash Bruce Wayne to gain access to his money, kidnapping him as he is leaving a party. Harley and Ivy go on a shopping spree using Bruce's money. However, Ivy's mind control wears off as Bruce is leaving the store. Bruce accidentally falls off a ledge, with Harley and Ivy believing him to have died. Shortly afterward, Bruce resurfaces as Batman and stops Harley and Ivy.; 2) On December 24, Barbara Gordon is shopping to get a gift for her father while Harvey Bullock and Renee Montoya are there investigating a shoplifting criminal, with Bullock posing as a mall Santa. Barbara discovers that the culprit is Clayface, who has duplicated himself and is posing as several children. As Batgirl, Barbara works with Montoya and Bullock to stop Clayface.; 3) On December 31, the Joker hijacks a broadcast of a football game to announce that he has decided not to kill anyone in the following year. However, he plans to kill several people before the night's end with a sonic bomb. After Batman and Robin stop him, the former meets with Gordon to celebrate the new year.; Notes: Based on the comic The Batman Adventures Holiday Special (February 1995) by Paul Dini and Bruce Timm.; This episode takes place after the episodes "Sins of the Father" and "Growing Pains", which introduces Tim Drake and brings Clayface back after his apparent death in "Mudslide".
| 2 | "Sins of the Father" | Curt Geda | Rich Fogel | September 20, 1997 |
After his father Steven fled from Two-Face and died in Metropolis, Tim Drake is forced to scavenge on the streets to survive and comes into conflict with the police. Eventually, he is kidnapped by Two-Face and his men, but Batman arrives to rescue him. After Batman is wounded in the battle, Tim is forced to pilot the Batboat to get him to safety and discovers his identity after looking around his house, becoming Robin to help him stop Two-Face after learning that his father was trying to stop a terrorist attack before fleeing.
| 3 | "Cold Comfort" | Dan Riba | Hilary J. Bader | October 11, 1997 |
Having become distraught after his revived wife Nora remarried (after waiting extensively for him), Mr. Freeze begins destroying valuable objects to make others feel the same as him. Batman and Batgirl then fight to stop him from detonating a bomb over Gotham to blanket it in ice, during which the bomb falls into the water and Freeze is presumed dead in the resulting explosion.
| 4 | "Never Fear" | Kenji Hachizaki | Stan Berkowitz | November 1, 1997 |
After stopping a man who had been dangerously swinging around Gotham, Batman learns that the Scarecrow has created a variant of fear gas that eliminates fear, making those exposed to it reckless and violent. While investigating, Batman is captured and sprayed with the gas, forcing Robin to restrain him in the Batwing and face Scarecrow alone. Eventually, he stops him from releasing the gas on a train and retrieves an antidote for Batman.
| 5 | "You Scratch My Back" | Butch Lukic | Hilary J. Bader | November 15, 1997 |
While combating a Latin American smuggling ring led by Enrique El Gaucho, Nightwing gets assistance from Catwoman despite the objections of Batgirl, who believes her to be untrustworthy. Catwoman eventually betrays Nightwing to obtain the valuable Cat's Eye Diamond, but he chooses to rescue her after a fuel tanker explodes as they are fighting.
| 6 | "Double Talk" | Curt Geda | Robert Goodman | November 22, 1997 |
Arnold Wesker, the former Ventriloquist, is rehabilitated after spending time in Arkham Asylum and is employed at Wayne Enterprises. However, he is haunted by his past and manipulated by his former gang members, who make him believe that his dummy Scarface is alive and capable of independent movement. Eventually, Batman helps Wesker overcome their influence, after which he destroys Scarface with an industrial grinder.
| 7 | "Joker's Millions" | Dan Riba | Paul Dini | February 21, 1998 |
Following the death of crime boss Edward Barlowe, the Joker is selected to receive his $250 million will. With his money, he recruits a team of lawyers to erase his criminal records and replace Harley with a new hench-girl. However, he eventually learns that most of the money is counterfeit and is ultimately defeated and arrested. Note: Based on the comic book story of the same name from Detective Comics #180 (February 1952) by writer David Vern Reed and artist Dick Sprang.
| 8 | "Growing Pains" | Atsuko Tanaka | Story by : Paul Dini and Robert Goodman; Teleplay by : Robert Goodman | February 28, 1998 |
Robin rescues a mysterious girl from being attacked by a street gang and names her Annie. She explains that she lacks memories of her past and is running from a man who claims to be her father. The two eventually learn that she is a part of Clayface that he separated from himself to scout Gotham. However, he no longer has use for her and seeks to re-absorb her. Robin tries to save Annie, but she chooses to sacrifice herself to save him. An infuriated Robin then attacks Clayface with solvent, causing an explosion that knocks him out.
| 9 | "Mean Seasons" | Hiroyuki Aoyama | Story by : Rich Fogel; Teleplay by : Hilary J. Bader | April 25, 1998 |
A mysterious masked criminal dubbed "Calendar Girl" attacks youth-oriented events on specific dates and kidnaps the businesspeople behind them. Eventually, Batman and Batgirl discover that she is Page Monroe, a former model and spokesperson who retired after turning 30 and being subjected to ageism. They manage to defeat her and rescue her captives, but she has a mental breakdown after Harvey Bullock removes her mask, no longer able to see her beauty. Note: Loosely based on the comic-book story "Who Dies for the Manikin?" from Detective Comics #506 (September 1981) and "Dressed to Die!" from Detective Comics #507 (October 1981) by writer Gerry Conway and artist Don Newton. The antagonist Miranda, or Manikin in the comic books, had her name changed to "Calendar Girl" in the animated series along with adopting an obsession with holidays. Taken from another Batman villain named Calendar Man.
| 10 | "The Demon Within" | Atsuko Tanaka | Story by : Rusti Bjornhöel; Teleplay by : Stan Berkowitz | May 9, 1998 |
While attending an auction, Bruce and Tim reunite with Jason Blood, an old friend of Bruce. Klarion the Witch Boy, who is also in attendance, steals a magic branding iron which was up for auction. Using the iron, Klarion separates Blood from Etrigan the Demon, who Merlin had bonded him to centuries prior, and takes control of Etrigan. Without Merlin's curse to sustain his youth, Blood begins to rapidly age, forcing Tim to take care of him while Batman races to retrieve the iron. After Batman retrieves the iron, Etrigan breaks free of Klarion's control and helps defeat Klarion, then imprisons him in a crystal ball. Note: This episode was the final performance of actor Stephen Wolfe Smith (Klarion), who died in 2000.
| 11 | "Over the Edge" | Yuichiro Yano | Paul Dini | May 23, 1998 |
After Barbara is killed during a fight with the Scarecrow, Gordon is distraught and works with the GCPD to hunt Batman down, believing him to be responsible. Deducing Batman's secret identity, they raid Wayne Manor and arrest Alfred and Nightwing, forcing Batman to go on the run and leave Tim behind. During Barbara's funeral, Bane attacks Batman before killing him and Gordon. It is then revealed that the events were an extended hallucination Barbara had after being exposed to Scarecrow's fear gas, with her being hospitalized before eventually recovering.
| 12 | "Torch Song" | Curt Geda | Rich Fogel | June 13, 1998 |
Bruce and his date, Shannon, go to a concert by Cassidy. Before the show, Cassidy confronts her former lover, pyrotechnician Garfield Lynns, whom she no longer wants to be with. This leads him to become the villain Firefly to seek revenge against her. He attempts to destroy Gotham with a special incendiary gel he developed before Batman stops him. Later, Cassidy's agent plans to capitalize on her experience, not realizing that she has developed pyrophobia.
| 13 | "Love Is a Croc" | Butch Lukic | Steve Gerber | July 11, 1998 |
Following her previous encounter with Batman, Mary Dahl has been largely rehabilitated and become a motel attendant. However, she is treated rudely by its guests, who recognize her criminal past. As she sees a broadcast of Killer Croc's trial, she realizes that they are both outcasts from society and chooses to break him out of prison. However, she eventually realizes that he has been manipulating her and attempts to destroy Gotham in her rage before Batman stops her.
| 14 | "The Ultimate Thrill" | Dan Riba | Hilary J. Bader | September 14, 1998 |
Batman encounters Roxy Rocket, a thief and former stuntwoman obsessed with danger and thrills. She is working with the Penguin, but he is worried that she will damage his reputation as a legitimate businessman and attempts to kill her. She escapes and enters a chase with Batman before he defeats her.
| 15 | "Cult of the Cat" | Butch Lukic | Story by : Paul Dini and Stan Berkowitz; Teleplay by : Stan Berkowitz | September 18, 1998 |
After stealing a cat statue from an ancient cat-worshipping cult led by Thomas Blake, Catwoman is hunted by its members and works with Batman to evade them. However, she is eventually captured by the cult and decides to join them. They sentence Batman to battle a giant tiger, during which Catwoman has a change of heart and helps Batman defeat and tame it to stop the cult's members.
| 16 | "Critters" | Dan Riba | Story by : Steve Gerber; Teleplay by : Joe R. Lansdale | September 19, 1998 |
During an agricultural expo, farmer Enoch Brown demonstrates genetically-engineered animals he created in an attempt to address world hunger before being imprisoned in Arkham Asylum after one of his cows attacks the audience. One year later, he and his daughter Emmylou work to attack Gotham with their animals and eventually lock Batman, Robin, Batgirl, and Harvey Bullock in a missile containing an army of mantises. However, they escape and damage the missile, causing it to detonate mid-flight.
| 17 | "Animal Act" | Curt Geda | Hilary J. Bader | September 26, 1998 |
As Haly's Circus is visiting Gotham, Batman and Nightwing discover that its animals are committing robberies, displaying unusually high intelligence and dexterity. They suspect animal trainer Miranda Kane to be responsible, but eventually learn that the culprit is the Mad Hatter, who had disguised himself as a clown and remotely controlled the animals to steal for him. The two eventually confront and defeat him, after which Tim is assigned to work with Miranda for a week to learn more about the circus.
| 18 | "Old Wounds" | Curt Geda | Rich Fogel | October 3, 1998 |
While on patrol, Robin encounters Nightwing and asks him how he and Batman grew apart. Flashbacks reveal that Bruce became estranged from Dick after becoming too busy with crimefighting to be with him. After a fight with the Joker, Dick accuses Batman of manipulating his loved ones and chooses to leave him and become Nightwing. In the present, after learning that Bruce helped rehabilitate former criminal Connor and got him a job at Wayne Enterprises, Dick considers reconciling with him.
| 19 | "Legends of the Dark Knight" | Dan Riba | Story by : Robert Goodman and Bruce Timm; Teleplay by : Robert Goodman | October 10, 1998 |
Late at night, three children – Matt, Nick, and Carrie – read a report on a mysterious arsonist and tell each other their perceptions of Batman. In these stories, Batman and Robin respectively fight the Joker, who seeks to steal valuable instruments and music sheets, and a gang of thugs dubbed the Mutants. As the three head home, they are attacked by Firefly before Batman rescues them. Note: Loosely based on "The Batman Nobody Knows!" from Batman #250 (July 1973) by Frank Robbins and Dick Giordano and "Stories" from Batman: Legends of the Dark Knight #94 (March 1997) by Michael T. Gilbert. The first story is based from Detective Comics #91 (July 1944) and World's Finest Comics #48 (August 1950), while the second story is a direct adaptation of The Dark Knight Returns (June–December 1986) by Frank Miller.
| 20 | "Girls' Night Out" | Curt Geda | Hilary J. Bader | October 17, 1998 |
While being transported to Gotham to undergo experimental treatment and return to her human form, Livewire escapes and allies with Harley Quinn and Poison Ivy. Meanwhile, Supergirl is house-sitting for Superman while he is out of town. Disappointed by having no crime to fight, she eagerly works with Batgirl to stop the villainous trio. During their confrontation, Ivy and Livewire incapacitate each other after the latter accidentally ignites the former's plants and she knocks Livewire out with a blast of water while trying to extinguish them.
| 21 | "Chemistry" | Butch Lukic | Stan Berkowitz | October 24, 1998 |
Bruce attends the wedding of Veronica Vreeland and her husband Michael and falls in love with fellow attendee Susan Maguire, planning to marry her and retire. However, as they prepare to go on a honeymoon yacht cruise, Bruce learns that Michael, Susan, and several other people are humanoid plant creatures created by Poison Ivy to steal their spouses' money. In the ensuing fight, Ivy is presumed dead and Susan is killed when the yacht sinks. However, Bruce no longer cares for her and throws away his wedding ring.
| 22 | "Judgment Day" | Curt Geda | Rich Fogel and Alan Burnett | October 31, 1998 |
The Judge, a violent court-themed vigilante, appears in Gotham and attacks several villains, being endorsed by councilman J. Carroll Corcoran. Two-Face kidnaps and attempts to kill Corcoran, but Batman arrives to rescue him. Eventually, Batman discovers that the Judge and Two-Face are the same person, with the former being a second alternate personality created by Harvey in an attempt to do good, and manages to defeat him.
| 23 | "Beware the Creeper" | Dan Riba | Story by : Rich Fogel; Teleplay by : Steve Gerber | November 7, 1998 |
Jack Ryder is reporting on the anniversary of the accident at Ace Chemicals that created the Joker, which Bruce Wayne watches from home. Ryder is attacked by the Joker, exposed to Joker venom, then thrown into a vat of chemicals. The combination of chemicals and Joker venom transforms Ryder into the Creeper, a yellow-skinned madman. Creeper attempts to get revenge on the Joker, but is thwarted by Batman, who creates a skin patch to return him to his human form. However, Ryder doubts the patch's effectiveness and secretly removes it. Notes The Creeper (vol. 2) comic series (October 2006 – March 2007) incorporated some of the storyline of this episode to the newly revised original story. Prior to 2006, Creeper had no association with the Joker except for being confused for him in Joker #3 (October 1975).
| 24 | "Mad Love" | Butch Lukic | Story by : Paul Dini and Bruce Timm; Teleplay by : Paul Dini | January 16, 1999 |
While planning better ways to kill Batman, the Joker rejects Harley, leading her to leave him. As she laments her life, flashbacks reveal that she was originally a psychiatrist at Arkham Asylum before the Joker manipulated her into joining him by claiming to have an abusive childhood. Harley then attempts to kill Batman by having him be eaten alive by piranhas before being defeated and imprisoned in Arkham. Harley is about to give up on the Joker, but relents after seeing that he sent her a card. Note: Adaptation of the Eisner Award-winning 1994 comic book of the same name by Paul Dini and Bruce Timm.

=== Crossovers ===
==== Superman: The Animated Series ====
| No. | Title | Directed by | Written by | Original release date |
|---|---|---|---|---|
| 29 | "World's Finest" | Toshihiko Masuda | Alan Burnett, Paul Dini and Rich Fogel; Story by : Alan Burnett and Paul Dini | October 4, 1997 |
| 30 | "World's Finest" | Toshihiko Masuda | Steve Gerber; Story by : Alan Burnett and Paul Dini | October 4, 1997 |
| 31 | "World's Finest" | Toshihiko Masuda | Stan Berkowitz; Story by : Alan Burnett and Paul Dini | October 4, 1997 |
Batman and Superman team up to take on their respective archenemies, the Joker and Lex Luthor.
| 43 | "Knight Time" | Curt Geda | Robert Goodman | October 10, 1998 |
Superman comes to Gotham to fill in for Batman, who has mysteriously disappeared.
| 52 | "The Demon Reborn" | Dan Riba | Rich Fogel | September 18, 1999 |
Ra's al Ghul needs Superman's strength to fully heal, so Batman steps in to stop him.

==== Static Shock ====
| No. | Title | Directed by | Written by | Original release date |
|---|---|---|---|---|
| 14 | "The Big Leagues" | Dave Chlystek | Len Uhley | January 26, 2002 |
Static works with Batman and Robin to stop the Joker and his gang of bang babies.
| 25 | "Hard as Nails" | Kirk Tingblad (animation) | Paul Dini | January 25, 2003 |
Static reteams with Batman to help a girl whose powers are being used by Harley Quinn and Poison Ivy to steal shipments of gold.
| 40 | "Future Shock" | Vic Dal Chele | Stan Berkowitz | January 17, 2004 |
After assisting Batman and Robin with a mission to stop Timecode, Static is accidentally sent 40 years into the future, where he has to help the Batman of that era, Terry McGinnis, save a captured superhero: Static's future self.

== Home media ==
DVD box set of The New Batman Adventures

On December 6, 2005, The New Batman Adventures was released on DVD by Warner Home Video (via DC Entertainment and Warner Bros. Family Entertainment) under the title of Batman: The Animated Series - Volume Four (from The New Batman Adventures) to coincide with the previous three-volume DVD sets of Batman: The Animated Series. The series was released a second time on November 4, 2008, as part of a DVD release entitled Batman: The Complete Animated Series, which contained the episodes of all four volumes that were released in 2004/2005. The series has also been released for online media distribution services such as iTunes and Google Play specifically as "Season/Volume 4" of the complete animated series when the original two-season animated series was broken out differently into three seasons. The series was released on Blu-ray as part of Batman: The Complete Animated Series in the fall of 2018.

It is subsumed as Season 3 of the original series when it debuted on HBO Max on January 1, 2021.

== Feature films ==
- Batman: Mystery of the Batwoman (2003), a direct-to-video release

== Video games ==
- Batman: Vengeance, published by Ubisoft for the Game Boy Advance, PlayStation 2, GameCube, and Xbox consoles as well as Microsoft Windows; featuring the Joker, Harley Quinn, Mr. Freeze, and Poison Ivy as antagonists
- Batman: Rise of Sin Tzu, the sequel to Batman: Vengeance, featuring original villain Sin Tzu
- Batman: Chaos in Gotham, a platforming action video game for the Game Boy Color
- Batman: Gotham City Racer, a racing game for the PlayStation

== Books ==
Capstone publishes children's chapter books containing illustrations with character designs from The New Batman Adventures.

== Awards and nominations ==
| Award | Year | Category | Nominee(s) | Result | Ref. |
|---|---|---|---|---|---|
| Annie Awards | 1999 | Outstanding Achievement in an Animated Television Program | | Nominated | |
| Annie Awards | 1999 | Outstanding Individual Achievement for Production Design in an Animated Television Production | Glen Murakami (for "Legends of the Dark Knight") | Won | |
| Annie Awards | 2000 | Outstanding Individual Achievement for Voice Acting by a Male Performer in an Animated Television Production | David Warner | Nominated | |
| Daytime Emmy Awards | 1998 | Outstanding Special Class Animated Program | Jean MacCurdy, Alan Burnett, Paul Dini, Bruce Timm, Hilary Bader, Stan Berkowitz, Rich Fogel, Steve Gerber, Bob Goodman, Hiroyuki Aoyama, Curt Geda, Kenji Hachizaki, Butch Lukic, Toshihiko Masuda, Dan Riba, Andrea Romano, and Yûichirô Yano | Won (Note: Shared with Superman: The Animated Series.) | |
| Daytime Emmy Awards | 1998 | Outstanding Music Direction and Composition | Shirley Walker | Nominated | |
| Daytime Emmy Awards | 1998 | Outstanding Sound Editing – Special Class | Robert Hargreaves, John Hegedes, George Brooks, Gregory Beaumont, Kelly Ann Foley, and Diane Griffen | Nominated | |
| Daytime Emmy Awards | 1999 | Outstanding Special Class Animated Program | Jean MacCurdy, Alan Burnett, Paul Dini, Glen Murakami, Bruce Timm, Hilary Bader, Stan Berkowitz, Rich Fogel, Bob Goodman, Hiroyuki Aoyama, Curt Geda, Kenji Hachizaki, Butch Lukic, Toshihiko Masuda, Dan Riba, Andrea Romano, and Yûichirô Yano | Nominated | |
| Daytime Emmy Awards | 1999 | Outstanding Music Direction and Composition | Michael McCuistion (for "Judgment Day") | Nominated | |
| Daytime Emmy Awards | 1999 | Outstanding Music Direction and Composition | Shirley Walker (for "Legends of the Dark Knight") | Nominated | |
| Daytime Emmy Awards | 1999 | Outstanding Sound Mixing – Special Class | Tom Maydeck, Robert Hargreaves, Patrick Rodman, and John Hegedes | Won (Note: Shared with Superman: The Animated Series.) | |
| Daytime Emmy Awards | 2000 | Outstanding Children's Animated Program | Jean MacCurdy, Alan Burnett, Paul Dini, Glen Murakami, Bruce Timm, Hilary Bader, Stan Berkowitz, Rich Fogel, Bob Goodman, Curt Geda, Butch Lukic, Dan Riba, Andrea Romano, and Shin'ichi Tsuji | Nominated | |
| Daytime Emmy Awards | 2000 | Outstanding Sound Editing – Special Class | Robert Hargreaves, George Brooks, Gregory Beaumont, Mark Keatts, John Hegedes, Linda Di Franco, Kelly Ann Foley, and Diane Griffen | Nominated | |
| Golden Reel Awards | 1998 | Best Sound Editing – Television Animated Series | | Nominated | |
| Golden Reel Awards | 1998 | Best Sound Editing – Television Animated Specials | Robert Hargreaves, Mark Keatts, Gregory Beaumont, George Brooks, John Hegedes, and Kelly Ann Foley | Won (Note: Tied with The Simpsons for "Treehouse of Horror VIII".) | |
| Young Artist Awards | 1998 | Best Performance in a Voice-Over in a Feature Film or TV – Young Actor | Mathew Valencia | Nominated | |

== See also ==
- Chase Me, a short silent film released as a bonus feature on the DVD of Batman: Mystery of the Batwoman
- Gotham Girls, Warner Bros' official series of Flash animations using many of the characters from the television series
