= Bluth =

Bluth is a surname of Germanic origin. In some instances, the surname is derived from the German word "Blut," meaning blood.

== Surname origins ==
One of the earliest documented families surnamed Bluth originated in the Hanseatic League city of Stralsund in Pomerania along the southern coast of the Baltic Sea, in what is today the German state or "Land" of Mecklenburg-Vorpommern in eastern Germany. Some members of this family were active in the Protestant Reformation and served as Lutheran pastors for many generations in what is present-day Germany. Another branch of this Bluth family migrated from Pomerania to Sweden in the 18th century. Four generations later, members of this branch converted to the Church of Jesus Christ of Latter-day Saints (LDS Church) and emigrated to Utah. Today, descendants of these Swedish Bluth immigrant ancestors are found throughout the United States and in parts of Mexico.

Other American Bluths arriving from Europe were often Jewish. Still others emigrants, whether or not Jewish, many have dropped their surname prefix, e.g., Rosenbluth, etc.

Variations of the Pomeranian surname Bluth include Bloth, Bluth, de Bloot, etc. The Low German variant "Bloth" was restored by a German branch of the Pomeranian Bluth family following World War II.

== People ==
- Avi Bluth (born 1974), Israeli brigadier general
- Christoph Hartmut Bluth, Scholar of International Studies
- Don Bluth (1937–living), American animator and film producer
- Gayle Bluth (1925–2013), Mexican basketball player
- Hermann Bluth, German architect
- Karl Theodor Bluth (1892–1964), German psychiatrist and writer
- Toby Bluth (1940–2013), American children's story author and illustrator
- Jonathan Bluth (1989–living), American singer and songwriter

== Entertainment ==
- Michael Bluth, TV series character of Arrested Development
- See also list of Arrested Development characters

== See also ==
- Don Bluth Productions
- Sullivan Bluth Studios
