= Joseph Ashton (actor) =

American actor (born 1986)

- Born: Joseph Ashton Valencia; November 18, 1986 (age 40); Cherokee, California, U.S.
- Education: University of La Verne
- Occupation: Actor
- Years active: 1994–2004
- Children: 2
- Relatives: Mathew Valencia (brother)

Joseph Ashton Valencia (born November 18, 1986) is an American former child actor. He is best known for his role as Oswald "Otto" Rocket in Nickelodeon's animated series Rocket Power.

== Early life ==
Ashton was born on November 18, 1986, in Cherokee, California. His parents reportedly have Cherokee descent. He is the younger brother of actor Mathew Valencia.

== Career ==
Ashton begin his acting career in 1994, he first appeared before the camera as an infant in a national McDonald's commercial. He had a regular role on the CBS drama L.A. Doctors. His guest-starring roles on television series include ER, Dr. Quinn Medicine Woman, Walker, Texas Ranger, Martial Law, Cracker and Smart Guy. He appeared in Asylum as Young Tordone on HBO, and the NBC mini series Blind Faith.

Ashton's film debut was in the 1994 remake of The Little Rascals. He notably starred in the title role of the 1997 film, The Education of Little Tree, a well-reviewed low-budget film about a 1930s-era boy discovering his Native American heritage. He earned a Young Artist Award for Best Performance In A Feature Film for the movie. Roger Ebert, in his review said "Ashton, as Little Tree, is another of those young actors who is fresh and natural on camera; I believed in his character." The Boston Phoenix lauded him as "adorable and energetic."

Ashton starred as 'Sonny', in Slappy and the Stinkers and won a Young Artist Award for Best Young Ensemble Performance in a feature film. He also appeared in the 2003 remake of Where the Red Fern Grows, playing the main character, Billy Coleman.

Ashton was also the voice of Otto Rocket in Nickelodeon's animated series Rocket Power from 1999 to 2004. He reprised his role as the voice of Otto Rocket in the television movie Rocket Power: Race Across New Zealand for Nickelodeon and in the video games. Ashton has lent his voice to other animated projects including Hey Arnold, Whatever Happened to... Robot Jones? and the animated films Babes in Toyland and Tarzan.

Ashton has also teamed up with EndlessEntertainment Co., and even produced his own films.

== Personal life ==
He is a graduate of the University of La Verne, where he majored in TV and radio broadcasting.

== Filmography ==
=== Film ===
Year	Title	Role	Notes
1994	The Little Rascals	Rascal	
1997	The Education of Little Tree	Little Tree	Young Artist Award
1997	Babes in Toyland	Jack (voice)	
1998	Slappy and the Stinkers	Sonny	Young Artist Award
1999	Tarzan	Ape Boy (voice)	
1999	Fallout	Ethan McCord	
2003	Where the Red Fern Grows	Billy Coleman	

=== Television ===
Year	Title	Role	Notes
1996	Dr. Quinn Medicine Woman	Looks For The Sun	Episode: "Hearts and Minds"
1997	Walker, Texas Ranger	Nicholas Matacio	Episode: "A Father's Image"
1997	Smart Guy	Eldin	Episode: "Pilot"
1997	Asylum	Young Nicholas Tordone	HBO film
1998	Cracker: Mind Over Murder	Jamie Ramos	Episode: "If" (part 1 and 2)
1998–1999	L.A. Doctors	Nick Newman	9 episodes
1998–2002	Hey Arnold!	Iggy (voice)	2 episodes
1999	Martial Law	Sean Nolan	Episode: "Substitutes"
1999–2004	Rocket Power	Oswald "Otto" Rocket (voice)	Main role
2001	ER	Jeremy Norris	Episode: "If I Should Fall From Grace"
2002	Rocket Power: Race Across New Zealand	Otto Rocket (voice)	Television film
2004	Rocket Power: Island of the Menehune	Otto Rocket (voice)	Television film

=== Video games ===
Year	Title	Role	Notes
1999	Mugen	Additional voices	Archive recordings
2001	Rocket Power: Team Rocket Rescue	Oswald "Otto" Rocket	
2001	Nicktoons Nick Tunes	Oswald "Otto" Rocket	
2002	Nickelodeon Party Blast	Oswald "Otto" Rocket	
2002	Rocket Power: Beach Bandits	Oswald "Otto" Rocket	
2004	Nicktoons Movin'	Oswald "Otto" Rocket	
