= Jason Stanford =

Jason Stanford may refer to:

- Jason Stanford (baseball) (born 1977), Major League Baseball pitcher
- Jason Stanford (actor) (born 1953), American actor
- Jason Stanford (consultant) (born 1970), communications director for Austin mayor Steve Adler
- Jason Gray-Stanford (born 1970), Canadian actor
