= 20th Youth in Film Awards =

1999 US media awards ceremony

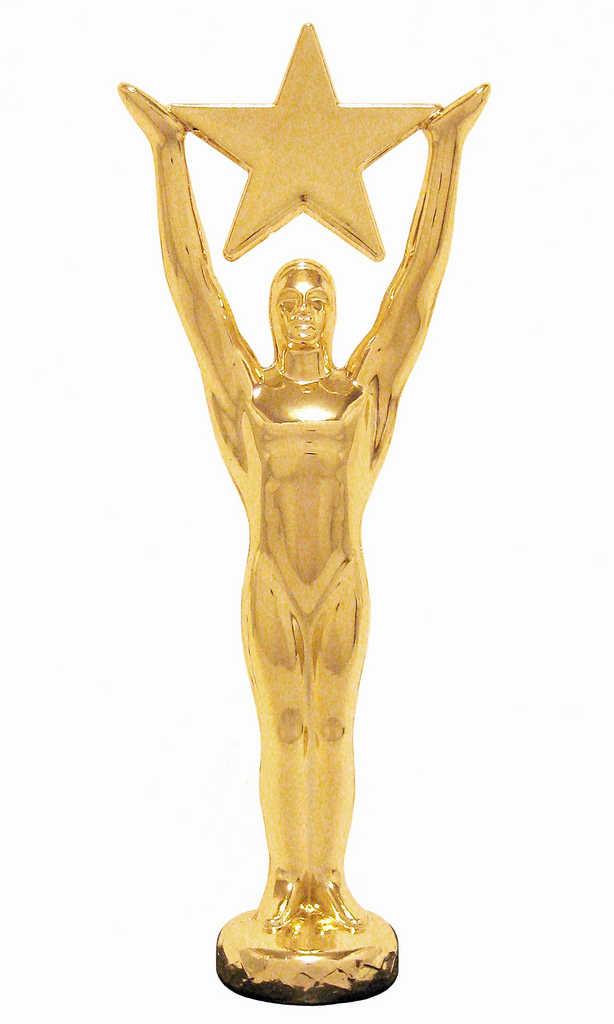
- Awarded for: Achievement in the 1997—1998 season
- Date: March 6, 1999
- Site: Sportsmen's Lodge; Studio City, California
- Hosted by: Jena Malone; R.J. Arnett; Roland Thomson; Justin Thomsom; Selwyn Ward; Tracy Lynn Cruz

The 20th Youth in Film Awards ceremony (now known as the Young Artist Awards), presented by the Youth in Film Association, honored outstanding youth performers under the age of 21 in the fields of film and television for the 1997–1998 season, and took place on March 6, 1999, at the Sportsmen's Lodge in Studio City, California. The hosts for the ceremony that evening were Jena Malone, R.J. Arnett, Roland Thomson, Justin Thomsom, Selwyn Ward and Tracy Lynn Cruz.

Established in 1978 by long-standing Hollywood Foreign Press Association member, Maureen Dragone, the Youth in Film Association was the first organization to establish an awards ceremony specifically set to recognize and award the contributions of performers under the age of 21 in the fields of film, television, theater and music.

== Categories ==
★ Bold indicates the winner in each category.

== Best Young Performer in a Feature Film ==
=== Best Performance in a Feature Film: Leading Young Actor ===
★ Miko Hughes – Mercury Rising – Universal as Simon Lynch

- Michael Caloz – Little Men – Warner Bros. as Nat Blake
- Joseph Cross – Wide Awake – Miramax as Joshua Beal
- Kieran Culkin – The Mighty – Miramax as Kevin Dillon/Freak
- Kyle Gibson – True Friends – 2nd Generation Films as Young Joey
- Joseph Mazzello – Simon Birch – Hollywood Pictures as Joe Wenteworth
- Eamonn Owens – The Butcher Boy – Warner Bros. as Francie Brady
- Ian Michael Smith – Simon Birch – Hollywood Pictures as Simon Birch
- Gregory Smith – Small Soldiers – DreamWorks as Alan Abernathy
- Kevin Zegers – Air Bud: Golden Receiver – Keystone Entertainment as Josh Framm

=== Best Performance in a Feature Film: Leading Young Actress ===
★ (tie) Lindsay Lohan – The Parent Trap – Walt Disney Pictures as Hallie Parker/Annie James
★ (tie) Jena Malone – Stepmom – Columbia Pictures as Anna Harrison

- Kirsten Dunst – Small Soldiers – DreamWorks as Christy Fimple
- Jennifer Love Hewitt – Can't Hardly Wait – Columbia Pictures as Amanda Beckett
- Scarlett Johansson – The Horse Whisperer – Touchstone Pictures as Grace MacLean
- Emily Lipoma – Frog and Wombat – Pigtail Productions as Jane 'Wombat' Walker
- Leelee Sobieski – A Soldier's Daughter Never Cries – October Films as Charlotte Anne "Channe" Willis
- Katie Stuart – Frog and Wombat – Pigtail Productions as Allison 'Frog' Parker

=== Best Performance in a Feature Film: Supporting Young Actor ===
★ Michael Welch – Star Trek: Insurrection – Paramount as Artim

- Joseph Gordon-Levitt – Halloween H20: 20 Years Later – Miramax as Jimmy Howell
- Michael Cambridge – True Friends – 2nd Generation Films
- Kristian De La Osa – Madeline – Tristar as Pepito
- Edward Furlong – American History X – New Line Cinema as Danny Vinyard
- Mason Gamble – Rushmore – Touchstone Pictures as Dirk Calloway
- Jack Johnson – Lost in Space – New Line Cinema as Will Robinson
- Cody Lightning – Smoke Signals – Miramax as Young Victor Joseph
- Miles Marsico – Rhapsody in Bloom – Becker Films as Randy Bloom

=== Best Performance in a Feature Film: Supporting Young Actress ===
★ Brigid Tierney – Affliction – Lions Gate Films as Jill Whitehouse

- Camilla Belle – Practical Magic – Warner Bros. as Young Sally Owens
- Lacey Chabert – Lost in Space – New Line Cinema as Penny Robinson
- Auriol Evans – Hilary and Jackie – October Films as Young Jackie
- Keeley Flanders – Hilary and Jackie – October Films as Young Hilary
- Kyla Pratt – Dr. Dolittle – 20th Century Fox as Maya Dolittle
- Michelle Williams – Halloween H20: 20 Years Later – Miramax as Molly Cartwell
- Evan Rachel Wood – Practical Magic – Warner Bros. as Kylie Owens

=== Best Performance in a Feature Film: Young Actor Age Ten or Under ===
★ Liam Aiken – Stepmom – Columbia Pictures as Ben Harrison

- Cameron Finley – Hope Floats – 20th Century Fox as Travis
- Jason Fuchs – Mafia! – Touchstone as Vincenzo Cortino as Boy
- Darrell Johnston – Dancing at Lughnasa – Sony as Michael Mundy
- Robby Seager – Splitsville – Cineville Productions as Billy

=== Best Performance in a Feature Film: Young Actress Age Ten or Under ===
★ Mae Whitman – Hope Floats – 20th Century Fox as Bernice Pruitt

- Rachel Chamberlain – Faith – Alynne Entertainment
- Alana De Roma – Amy – Cascade Films as Amy Enker
- Hallie Kate Eisenberg – Paulie – DreamWorks as Young Marie Allweather
- Kulani Hassen – Down in the Delta – Miramax as Tracy Sinclair
- Hatty Jones – Madeline – Tristar as Madeline

== Best Young Performer in a TV Movie, Pilot or Mini-Series ==
=== Best Performance in a TV Movie / Pilot / Mini-Series: Leading Young Actor ===
★ Ryan Merriman – Everything That Rises – TNT as Nathan Clay

- Zachery Ty Bryan - Principal Takes a Holiday – ABC as John Scaduto
- Carlo Alban – Thicker Than Blood – TNT as Lee Cortez
- Brendan Ryan Barrett – Logan's War: Bound by Honor – ABC as Logan Fallon (Age 10)
- Trevor Blumas – Stranger in Town – Showtime as Aaron
- Jordan Kiziuk – The Island on Bird Street – Showtime as Alex

=== Best Performance in a TV Movie / Pilot / Mini-Series: Leading Young Actress ===
★ Dominique Swain – Lolita – Showtime as Dolores "Lolita" Haze

- Kimberly J. Brown – Halloweentown – Disney Channel as Marnie Piper
- Kristin Fairlie – The Sweetest Gift – Showtime as Kate Martin
- Kashmir Jones – World Upon Her Shoulder – Lifetime
- Brittany Murphy – David and Lisa – ABC as Lisa

=== Best Performance in a TV Movie / Pilot / Mini-Series: Supporting Young Actor ===
★ Courtland Mead – Emma's Wish – NBC as Danny Bookman

- Cody Jones – Running Wild – Showtime as Nicholas Robinson
- Eric Lloyd – Chameleon – UPN as Ghen
- Shawn Pyfrom – A Wing and a Prayer – USA Network as Justin
- Kenny Vadas – Galileo: On the Shoulders of Giants – Family Channel as Prince Cosimo
- Daniel Williams – Always Outnumbered – HBO as Darryl

=== Best Performance in a TV Movie / Pilot / Mini-Series: Supporting Young Actress ===
★ Haylie Duff – Addams Family Reunion – HBO as Gina Adams

- Courtney Red-Horse Mohl – Naturally Native – Independent Feature / Project West as Vickie Lewis Bighawk's daughter
- Brooke Nevin – Running Wild – Showtime as Angela Robinson

== Best Young Performer in a Television Series ==
=== Best Performance in a TV Drama or Comedy Series: Leading Young Actor ===
★ Zachery Ty Bryan – Home Improvement – ABC

- Thomas Dekker – Honey, I Shrunk the Kids – Disney
- David Lago – Hollywood Safari – Animal Planet Channel
- Robert Ri'chard – Cousin Skeeter – Nickelodeon
- Taran Noah Smith – Home Improvement – ABC
- Shawn Toovey – Dr. Quinn, Medicine Woman – CBS
- Lee Thompson Young – The Famous Jett Jackson – The Disney Channel

=== Best Performance in a TV Drama or Comedy Series: Leading Young Actress ===
★ Lacey Chabert – Party of Five – FOX

- Sarah Michelle Gellar – Buffy the Vampire Slayer – FOX
- Brandy Norwood – Moesha – UPN
- Larisa Oleynik – The Secret World of Alex Mack – Nickelodeon

=== Best Performance in a TV Drama Series: Supporting Young Actor ===
★ Ryan Merriman – The Pretender – NBC

- Joseph Ashton – L.A. Doctors – CBS
- Corey Sevier – Little Men – PAX
- Myles Jeffrey – Early Edition – CBS
- Trevor Morgan – ER – NBC
- Shane Sweet – The Journey of Allen Strange – Nickelodeon
- Oren Williams – Chicago Hope – CBS

=== Best Performance in a TV Drama Series: Supporting Young Actress ===
★ Scarlett Pomers – Star Trek: Voyager – UPN

- Erica & Vanessa Jimenez-Alvarado – L.A. Doctors – CBS
- Mae Middleton – Any Day Now – Lifetime
- Sarah Rayne – Legacy – UPN
- Shari Dyon Perry – Any Day Now – Lifetime
- Brittany Tiplady – Millennium – FOX
- Caitlin Wachs – Profiler – CBS

=== Best Performance in a TV Comedy Series: Supporting Young Actor ===
★ Eric Lloyd – Jesse – NBC

- Justin Berfield – Unhappily Ever After – UPN
- Justin Cooper – Brother's Keeper – ABC
- Dee Jay Daniels – The Hughleys – ABC
- Trevor Einhorn – Brother's Keeper – ABC
- Maestro Harrell – Guys Like Us – UPN
- Deon Richmond – Sister, Sister – WB
- Jeffrey Schoeny – Oh Baby – Lifetime

=== Best Performance in a TV Comedy Series: Supporting Young Actress ===
★ Ashley Monique Clark – The Hughleys – ABC

- Kaitlin Cullum – Grace Under Fire – ABC
- Brittany & Brianna McConnell – Maggie Winters – CBS
- Courtney Mun – Guys Like Us – UPN
- Natasha Slayton – Brother's Keeper – ABC
- Madylin Sweeten – Everybody Loves Raymond – CBS
- Karle Warren – DiResta – UPN

=== Best Performance in a TV Drama Series: Guest Starring Young Actor ===
★ Seth Adkins – The Pretender – NBC

- Jeremy Foley – Touched by an Angel – CBS
- Craig Hauer – 7th Heaven – WB
- Zack Hopkins – Promised Land – CBS
- Nathan Lawrence – Touched by an Angel – CBS
- Joey Pardon – High Incident – ABC
- Billie Thomas – The Practice – ABC

=== Best Performance in a TV Drama Series: Guest Starring Young Actress ===
★ Chaz Monet – Any Day Now – Lifetime

- Camilla Belle – Walker, Texas Ranger – CBS
- Kimberly Cullum – Nothing Sacred – ABC
- Olivia Marisco – Hyperion Bay – WB
- Ashley Peldon – The Pretender – ABC
- Nicholle Tom – Welcome to Paradox – Sci-Fi Channel
- Danielle Wiener – Beverly Hills, 90210 – FOX

=== Best Performance in a TV Comedy Series: Guest Starring Young Actor ===
★ (tie) Robert Bailey Jr. – Becker – CBS
★ (tie) Bobby Brewer – Suddenly Susan – NBC
★ (tie) Bobby Edner – Step By Step – CBS
★ (tie) Sam Gifaldi – Suddenly Susan – NBC
★ (tie) Jarrett Lennon – Boy Meets World – ABC

=== Best Performance in a TV Comedy Series: Guest Starring Young Actress ===
★ (tie) Anna Chlumsky – Cupid – ABC
★ (tie) Ashley & Lindsey Trefger – Home Improvement – ABC

- Courtney Peldon – Home Improvement – ABC
- Caitlin Wachs – To Have & to Hold – CBS

== Best Young Performer in a TV Daytime Series ==
=== Best Performance in a Daytime Serial: Young Performer ===
★ Adrienne Frantz – The Bold and the Beautiful – CBS

- Kimberly J. Brown – Guiding Light – CBS
- Ashley Monique Clark – Sunset Beach – NBC
- Camryn Grimes – The Young and the Restless – CBS
- Steven Hartman – The Young and the Restless – CBS
- Jonathan Jackson – General Hospital – ABC
- Logan O'Brien – General Hospital – ABC
- Carly Schroeder – Port Charles – CBS

== Best Young Performer Age 10 or Under ==
=== Best Performance in a TV Movie / Pilot / Mini-Series / Series: Young Actor Age Ten or Under ===
★ (tie) Paul Robert Langdon – The Spiral Staircase – CBS
★ (tie) Connor Matheus – The Hughleys – ABC

- Brent Meyer – The Sweetest Gift – Showtime
- Lowell Raven – Naturally Native – Independent Feature / Project West
- Jacob Smith – Party of Five – FOX

=== Best Performance in a TV Movie / Pilot / Mini-Series / Series: Young Actress Age Ten or Under ===
★ Chaz Monet – Ruby Bridges – ABC

- Hilary Duff – Casper Meets Wendy – FOX Channel
- Britt McKillip – In the Dog House – Showtime
- Carly McKillip – Stranger in Town – Showtime
- Dara Perlmutter – Scandalous Me: The Jacqueline Susann Story – USA

== Best Young Performer in a Voice-Over ==
=== Best Performance in a Voice-Over in a Feature or TV: Best Young Actor ===
★ Courtland Mead – Recess – ABC

- Jonathan Taylor Thomas – The Adventures of Pinocchio – New Line Cinema
- Miko Hughes – The Rugrats Movie – Paramount
- Myles Jeffrey – Babe: Pig in the City – Universal
- Mathew Valencia – The New Batman/Superman Adventures – WB
- Phillip Van Dyke – Hey Arnold! – Nickelodeon
- Michael Yarmush – Arthur – PBS

=== Best Performance in a Voice-Over in a Feature or TV: Best Young Actress ===
★ Aria Noelle Curzon – The Prince of Egypt – DreamWorks

- Ashley Johnson – Recess – ABC
- Julia McIlvaine – KaBlam! – Nickelodeon
- Hayden Panettiere – A Bug's Life – Walt Disney
- Sabrina Wiener – The Wild Thornberrys – Nickelodeon

== Best Young Ensemble Performance ==
=== Best Performance in a Feature Film: Young Ensemble ===
★ Slappy and the Stinkers – Columbia

Joseph Ashton, Gary LeRoi Gray, Travis Tedford, Carl Michael Lindner, Scarlett Pomers

- 3 Ninjas: High Noon at Mega Mountain – Tristar

Mathew Botuchis, Michael J. O'Laskey II, J.P. Roeske II

- The Borrowers – Polygram

Bradley Pierce, Hugh Laurie, Mark Williams, Flora Newbigin

=== Best Performance in a TV Movie / Pilot / Made-for-Video: Young Ensemble ===
★ The Sweetest Gift – Showtime

Kristin Fairlie, Dylon Provencher, Marc Donato

- Ruby Bridges – ABC

Chaz Monet, Kiara Tucker, Whitney Tucker, Christopher Stokes

- The Echo of Thunder – CBS

Lauren Hewett, Emily Jane Browning, Chelsea Yates, Ben Hanson

- Bus 9 – Nickelodeon

Jessica DiCicco, Keith Franklin, Peter Tombaki, Julianne Michelle

=== Best Performance in a TV Series: Young Ensemble ===
★ Promised Land – CBS

Austin O'Brien, Eddie Karr, Sarah Schaub

- 7th Heaven – WB

Beverley Mitchell, Barry Watson, Jessica Biel, David Gallagher, Mackenzie Rosman

- That '70s Show – FOX

Topher Grace, Laura Prepon, Mila Kunis, Wilmer Valderrama, Danny Masterson, Ashton Kutcher

- Hiller and Diller – ABC

Kyle Sabihy, Faryn Einhorn, Jillian Berard, Jonathan Osser

== Best Family Entertainment ==
=== Best Family TV Movie / Pilot / Mini-Series ===
★ Sabrina Goes to Rome – ABC

- The Sweetest Gift – Showtime
- In the Dog House – Showtime
- The Echo of Thunder – CBS
- Nicholas' Gift – CBS
- Merlin – NBC
- Everything that Rises – TNT

=== Best Family TV Drama Series ===
★ Promised Land – CBS

- Touched by an Angel – CBS
- 7th Heaven – Warner Bros.
- The Journey of Allen Strange – Nickelodeon
- Little Men – PAX

=== Best Family TV Comedy Series ===
★ The Hughleys – ABC

- Sabrina, the Teenage Witch – ABC
- Two of a Kind – ABC
- Smart Guy – Warner Bros.
- Flipper: The New Adventures – PAX

=== Best Educational TV Show or Series ===
★ From the Earth to the Moon – HBO

- Wishbone – PBS
- Bear in the Big Blue House – Disney Channel
- Blue's Clues – Nickelodeon
- Wild About Animals – ABC

=== Best Family Feature Film: Animated ===
★ The Prince of Egypt – DreamWorks

- A Bug's Life – Walt Disney Pictures
- Babe: Pig in the City – Universal
- Mulan – Walt Disney Pictures
- Rudolph the Red-Nosed Reindeer: The Movie – Goodtimes Entertainment
- The Rugrats Movie – Paramount

=== Best Family Feature Film: Comedy ===
★ The Mask of Zorro – Tristar

- The Borrowers – Polygram
- The Parent Trap – Walt Disney Pictures
- Madeline – Tristar
- Paulie – DreamWorks
- Patch Adams – Universal

=== Best Family Feature Film: Drama ===
★ Stepmom – Columbia

- The Mighty – Miramax
- Wide Awake – Miramax
- Simon Birch – Hollywood Pictures
- The Truman Show – Paramount
- Star Trek: Insurrection – Paramount
- Lost in Space – New Line Cinema

== Special awards ==
=== The Jackie Coogan Award ===
==== Outstanding Contribution to Youth Through Motion Pictures ====
★ Miramax Films – For having brought to the American audience so many outstanding domestic and foreign films featuring young performers. Their precedent lives on with the Italian film: Life Is Beautiful – starring the young Giorgio Cantarini.

=== The Michael Landon Award ===
==== Outstanding Contribution to Youth Through Television ====
★ CBS Television Network – For its family value shows, with particular mention of Touched by an Angel.

=== The Former Child Star Lifetime Achievement Awards ===
★ Drew Barrymore
★ Johnny Whitaker

=== The Outstanding Young Performer in a Television Commercial Award ===
★ Gary LeRoi Gray – For "I.H.O.P."

=== The Community Service Award ===
★ Julianne Michelle – For her achievements in raising funds for charities.
