= Where the Red Fern Grows (2003 film) =

- Film poster
- Directed by: Lyman Dayton; Sam Pillsbury
- Screenplay by: Doug C. Stewart; Eleanor Lamb; Lyman Dayton; Sam Pillsbury
- Based on: Where the Red Fern Grows by Wilson Rawls
- Produced by: David Alexanian; George Dayton; William J. Immerman; Shelley Monson; Bob Yari
- Starring: Joseph Ashton; Dave Matthews; Renee Faia; Mac Davis; Kris Kristofferson; Ned Beatty; Dabney Coleman
- Cinematography: James Jansen
- Edited by: Paul Trejo
- Music by: Jeff Cardoni
- Production companies: Crusader Entertainment; Elixir Films; Bob Yari Productions
- Distributed by: Walt Disney Home Entertainment
- Release dates: May 3, 2003 (Tribeca); December 21, 2004 (United States)
- Running time: 86 minutes
- Country: United States
- Language: English

Where the Red Fern Grows is a 2003 American drama adventure film directed by Lyman Dayton and Sam Pillsbury and starring Joseph Ashton, Dave Matthews, Ned Beatty and Dabney Coleman. Based on the children's book of the same name by Wilson Rawls and a remake of the 1974 film of the same name, it follows the story of Billy Colman who buys and trains two Redbone Coonhound hunting dogs to hunt raccoons in the Ozarks.

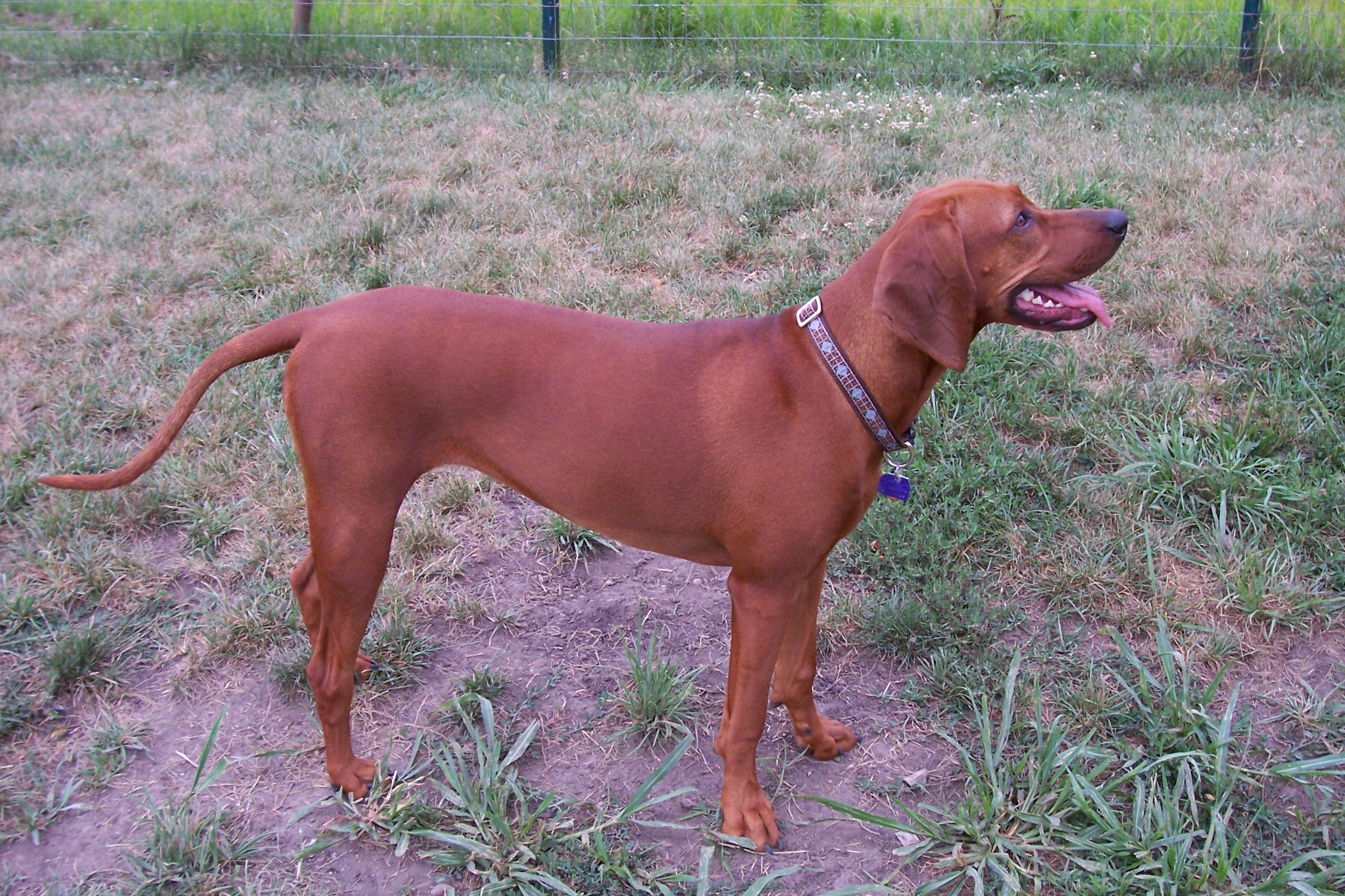
A Redbone Coonhound

== Plot ==
A middle-aged man named Billy Coleman rescues a beagle from stray dogs. He takes care of it, having a flashback to when he was ten years old and living in the Ozarks with his parents and two younger sisters.

Billy wants a pair of hunting dogs, but his parents can't afford them. He tells his grandfather that he believes that God does not want him to have dogs. His grandfather replies that he has to meet God halfway. After coming across an article in a sportsman magazine offering a pair of Redbone Coonhounds, he earns the money himself by working for two years. He reveals the money to his grandfather, having kept it a secret from his family, fearing his father would use it for a long-needed mule. Inspired by his hard work, his grandfather promises him his dogs.

Weeks later, Billy learns that the dogs were delivered to Tahlequah, not to his grandfather's store. His grandfather assures him that he can get a ride in a week. His impatience and concern for his dogs' wellbeing drive him to sneak out the following night to walk to Tahlequah.

Billy reaches Tahlequah the following morning and gets his dogs from the depot. When he returns home the next day, everyone is thrilled with his new dogs, whom he has named Old Dan and Little Ann. He trains them to be hunting dogs. On his first night hunt, they chase a raccoon up a large sycamore tree. Though he is discouraged, he promises to cut it down. It takes him over a day, and he runs out of strength before finishing the job. After asking God for help, the wind blows it down, allowing Old Dan and Little Ann to finish the hunt.

Billy, Old Dan, and Little Ann become a hunting legend in the Ozarks, bringing in countless raccoon hides. While at his grandfather's store, his rivals, Rubin and Rainie Pritchard, challenge him to a bet to hunt and chase the "ghost coon", which seemingly disappears every time a dog trees it. Billy stays true to his morals and refuses. After goading him, however, his grandfather is provoked to accept.

The boys and dogs hunt after the ghost coon, which seemingly disappears after being treed. However, Billy investigates a nearby shed and finds it hidden in the roof. Rubin and Rainie's dog, Old Blue, breaks free from the boys' bondage and pursues them. He gets into a scuffle with Old Dan, who overpowers him. As Billy climbs down to deescalate the fight, Rubin attempts to kill Old Dan with his axe. As Billy arrives, Rubin trips and falls on it. Rainie runs off to get help. Billy sees that Rubin is already dead. Ridden with guilt, he vows that he is done hunting.

Billy's grandfather persuades him to enter Old Dan and Little Ann in a championship raccoon hunt in the Ozarks. He decides to accept, agreeing with his grandfather that they deserve to prove their worth. At the hunt, Billy, along with his father and grandfather, reunite with the sheriff from Tahlequah, who is collecting for the hunt's prize money and gold cup. During the hunt a thunderstorm strikes. Billy's grandfather injures his leg after falling down a hill. Billy wins the hunt, and presents the prize money to his mother, and they can finally afford to move from the Ozarks to Tulsa, something she always wanted for them.

During a hunting night, Old Dan and Little Ann are attacked by a mountain lion. Billy scares it off with his axe. Little Ann survives, but Old Dan is mortally wounded. The entire family mourns for the loss of him. A few days later, Billy later finds Little Ann dead at Old Dan's grave, having died of sadness and starvation. His father says that they served their purpose as an answer to his mother's prayers for the move.

As the family packs for the move, Billy visits Old Dan and Little Ann's graves one last time. He sees that a red fern has grown between them. As they move, adult Billy narrates his desire to return to the Ozarks, "where the red fern grows".

== Cast ==
- Joseph Ashton as Billy Coleman
- Dave Matthews as Will Coleman
- Renee Faia as Jenny Coleman
- Mac Davis as Hod Bellington
- Kris Kristofferson as Older Billy Coleman
- Ned Beatty as Sheriff Abe McConnell
- Dabney Coleman as Grandpa

== Reception ==
Common Sense Media rated the film 3 out of 5 stars.
