= Bristol Bay Productions =

American film company

- Type: Private
- Founded: 2000; 26 years ago
- Headquarters: Beverly Hills, California, U.S.
- Parent: Walden Media

Bristol Bay Productions is a film company (the sister company of Walden Media), which produces films based on the books and lives of famous and influential people. It was established in May 2000 as Crusader Entertainment as a joint venture between Howard Baldwin and Karen Baldwin, and Anschutz Entertainment Group, and was renamed as Bristol Bay Productions in 2004.

== History ==
In May 2000, Howard Baldwin and Karen Bladwin formed a company, Crusader Entertainment, which in January 2001, had a first-look deal with Paramount Pictures to distribute its output. In 2002, the company had formed Epiphany Films to develop independent films with spiritual themes. In 2004, the company was renamed to Bristol Bay Productions.

In 2004, the Baldwins had left the company to start its own production company, Baldwin Entertainment Group. In 2006, the company had signed a first-look deal with 20th Century Fox. In 2008, it was consolidated and folded into Walden Media after its film executives of Anschutz Entertainment Group had been laid off.

== Filmography ==
=== Released films ===
==== As Crusader Entertainment ====
- Joshua (2002) (co-production with Epiphany Films LLC and Feelmax)
- Children on Their Birthdays (2002) (co-production with Frantic Redhead Productions and Salem Productions)
- Swimming Upstream (2003) (co-production with Pacific Film & Television Commission)
- Where the Red Fern Grows (2003) (co-production with Elixir Films, Bob Yari Productions, MysticArt Pictures, WTRFG, LLC, Doty-Dayton Production, and Persik Productions)
- Danny Deckchair (2003) (co-production with Macquarie Film Corporation, Cobalt Media Group, and City Productions Pty. Ltd.)
- A Sound of Thunder (2005) (co-production with Warner Bros. Pictures, Franchise Pictures, Baldwin Entertainment Group, Apollo Media, Dante Entertainment, Etic Films, Forge and QI Quality International)

==== As Bristol Bay Productions ====
- Ray (2004, co-production with Universal Pictures)
- Sahara (2005, co-production with Paramount Pictures)
- The Game of Their Lives (2005, co-production with IFC Films)
- Amazing Grace (2007, co-production with Roadside Attractions)
- The Great Buck Howard (2008, co-production with Magnolia Pictures, Walden Media and Playtone)
