= The Story of Santa Claus =

- Genre: Christmas; Comedy; Adventure; Musical
- Written by: Rachel Koretsky; Steven Whitestone
- Directed by: Toby Bluth
- Starring: Ed Asner; Betty White; Tim Curry
- Country of origin: United States
- Original language: English

Production
- Executive producers: Arnold Shapiro; Phil Roman
- Producer: Carol Corwin
- Running time: 47 minutes
- Production companies: Arnold Shapiro Productions; Film Roman; CBS Productions; CBS Broadcast International

Original release
- Network: CBS
- Release: December 7, 1996

The Story of Santa Claus is an American Christmas animated television special directed by Toby Bluth. It features the voices of Ed Asner, Betty White, and Tim Curry. It premiered on December 7, 1996 on CBS.

The special presents an origin story for Santa Claus, who is depicted as a man named Nicholas Claus who wishes to give every child in the world a gift for Christmas. The elves of the North Pole become obligated to grant his wish, facing great obstacles.

== Plot ==
The story opens in "Europe, a long time ago". Nicholas Claus, nicknamed "Santa" by his wife Gretchen, is a toymaker who wishes he could give a toy to every child in the world. It's explained that Nicholas grew up in the Angel's Island Orphanage, where he taught himself to make toys for the other children. However, Nicholas is now in debt because he gives away more toys than he sells. The Clauses are subsequently evicted by their greedy landlord, Mr. Minch, who subsequently forces Mrs. Claus to surrender her wedding ring as "payment".

Now penniless, Nicholas and Gretchen decide to take their remaining toys to the children at the Angel's Island Orphanage. However, their ship is caught up in a storm and they are miraculously transported to the North Pole. There they meet the elves, including wizardly elf Nostros, his son Clement, and the know-it-all elf girl Aurora. When Nicholas saves Clement's life, Nostros is forced to grant him a wish. Nicholas wishes that he could deliver toys to all the children in the world on Christmas. Nostros declares that this is impossible and trying to fulfill it will doom the elves by destroying their magic. However, the wish can't be taken back because it is now "etched among the stars".

Nicholas and Gretchen manage to recruit almost all the elves to help them. Soon they have built a toy factory and gotten to work. Nostros watches from afar, scoffing at their attempt to do the impossible and forbidding Clement from involving himself. Clement sneaks out to help anyway. On the big day, Aurora realizes Nicholas will have to be accompanied by a magical expert on his trip. She goes to Nostros, but he refuses. After thinking about it for a while, he changes his mind and goes to the toy factory to help Nicholas.

As their voyage around the world ends, Nicholas insists they make a stop at the Angel's Island Orphanage. He gives a young boy a knife so that he may whittle toys for the others as Nicholas once did. Once they return to the North Pole, Nostros and the other elves vote to bestow "honorary elfhood" upon the Clauses, making them immortal. Nicholas declares that they shall do this again every year forever and the elves cheer.

== Voice cast ==
- Ed Asner (speaking) and Jim Cummings (singing) as Santa Claus
- Betty White as Gretchen Claus
- Tim Curry as Nostros
- Miko Hughes as Clement
- Kathryn Zaremba as Aurora
- Jim Cummings as Mr. Minch

== Songs ==
- "To Give Every Child in the World a Toy" (performed by Jim Cummings)
- "We're Gonna Pull It Off" (performed by Jim Cummings, Miko Hughes, Kathryn Zaremba and Tim Curry)
- "Clement's Song" (performed by Jim Cummings and Miko Hughes)
- "Santa's Ride" (performed by Jim Cummings, Miko Hughes, and Kathryn Zaremba)

== Production ==
Phil Roman produced the special based on a teleplay by Steven Whitestone and Rachel Koretsky. Marie Maxwell and John Thomas wrote the songs.

Tim Curry was working in more voice acting in 1996, also voicing characters in Jumanji and Adventures from the Book of Virtues that year. Jim Cummings was well known for his voice work, and went on to make other Christmas specials such as Beauty and the Beast: The Enchanted Christmas and The Life & Adventures of Santa Claus.

== Broadcast and release ==
The special was first broadcast on December 7, 1996, on CBS. The special was broadcast annually on CBS until 2021. It was released on VHS by 20th Century Fox Home Entertainment in 1999 and also later released on a DVD recordable format DVD by CBS Home Entertainment in 2019 too. In 2020 the special was briefly added to CBS' streaming service, CBS All Access, now known as Paramount+, but did not transfer to the new platform during that time. As of December 2023 it is only legally available to view online via purchase from Amazon.com. It returned to MeTV Toons on December 6th, 2025, as part of their "Tis The Season for Toons" holiday-themed programming block.

== Reception ==
John Leonard, writing for New York, called the special "somewhat less animated" than the 1996 live action special Mrs. Santa Claus.
