= Babes in Toyland (1997 film) =

1997 American animated film by Charles Grosvenor, Toby Bluth and Paul Sabella

- Home video release poster
- Directed by: Charles Grosvenor; Toby Bluth; Paul Sabella
- Screenplay by: John Loy
- Based on: Babes in Toyland by Victor Herbert and Glen MacDonough
- Produced by: Paul Sabella; Jonathan Dern; Kelly Ward; Mark Young
- Starring: Lacey Chabert; Joseph Ashton; Raphael Sbarge; Cathy Cavadini; Charles Nelson Reilly; Susan Silo; James Belushi; Bronson Pinchot; Christopher Plummer; Lindsay Schnebly
- Music by: Mark Watters
- Production company: Metro-Goldwyn-Mayer Animation
- Distributed by: MGM/UA Home Video
- Release date: October 14, 1997
- Running time: 74 minutes
- Country: United States
- Language: English

Babes in Toyland is a 1997 American Christmas animated musical-comedy fantasy adventure film based on the 1903 operetta. Directed by Charles Grosvenor, Toby Bluth and Paul Sabella, the film stars the voices of Joseph Ashton, Lacey Chabert, Raphael Sbarge, Cathy Cavadini, Charles Nelson Reilly, Jim Belushi, Bronson Pinchot and Christopher Plummer. It was released direct-to-video by MGM/UA Home Video under their MGM/UA Family Entertainment label on October 14, 1997, in the United States.

== Plot ==
It's three days before Christmas Eve, as the conductor aboard the Toyland Express, Humpty Dumpty, meets two orphaned siblings, Jill and Jack, who are traveling from an orphanage and on their way to Toyland. After meeting Tom Piper and Mary, who runs her late father's toy factory, they go to live with their uncle, the evil Barnaby Crookedman, who despises toys, laughter, and fun and keeps Jack and Jill locked up in the tower of his mansion. He has plans to shut down the toy factory, and earlier shot down Tom's hot air balloon as he was flying over the Goblin Forest in an attempt to get him eaten by goblins (and is quite shocked to see him alive).

Jack and Jill sneak out and go to the Toy Factory, which has received a big order from Santa Claus requesting a thousand giant toy soldiers. Just as Jack and Jill offer to help, Barnaby abducts them and locks them back in the tower as punishment for escaping. Shortly afterward, he hires two crooks named Gonzargo and Rodrigo to sabotage the toy factory.

Jack and Jill sneak out and go to the toy factory again, where Gonzargo and Rodrigo, disguised as sheep, drop a monkey wrench into the gears of the factory's primary machine, but Jack manages to remove it before the machine can explode from pressure build-up. Jack and Jill immediately suspect Gonzargo and Rodrigo, though believing them to be sheep, and chase after them, resulting in Rodrigo and Gonzargo being knocked into a well by a ram and Jack and Jill, respectively, get knocked down by an empty pail and fall down the hill again.

Barnaby captures Jack and Jill again and has Gonzargo and Rodrigo take them to the Goblin Forest to keep them from interfering with their evil plan. There, they meet the mysterious Goblin King who tries to eat Gonzargo and Rodrigo after he first ate Jill's stuffed toy dog, Woofy. Mr. Dumpty informs Tom and Mary, who go to the forest to rescue them. As the goblins are weak against light, they use a flashlight to fight them off and escape. Barnaby knocks Mr. Dumpty over a bridge (while giving a mockery saying of the nursery rhyme which bears the egg's name) for the key to the factory and tries to enter it, but is stopped by Tom, Mary, Jack, Jill, Gonzargo, and Rodrigo, and is forced to retreat.

As Tom and Mary finish the Toy Factory's order and fall in love, Barnaby leads the goblins to Toyland, where they invade, setting fire to the buildings and roasting Gonzargo and Rodrigo on a rotisserie spit. Tom activates the toy soldiers, who soundly defeat the goblins and put out the fire, saving all of Toyland (including Gonzargo and Rodrigo). Barnaby insults the Goblin King, who tries to kill him, but Jack, Jill, and all the toy soldiers shine lights on the Goblin King, destroying him. Barnaby calls him a "pathetic ogre", and the other goblins chase him out of Toyland (though his fate is left unclear after his exile).

Christmas finally arrives; Jack and Jill (who received a new Woofy dog toy) have been adopted by Tom and Mary who have become their new parents, while Tom has repaired Mr. Dumpty with stainless steel, to make him unbreakable. Santa magically shrinks the toy soldiers down to the size of action figures and loads them into his bag. He notices Barnaby's cat, Scat, who is now homeless after Barnaby was chased away by the goblins. He picks her up and pets her. Jill asks Santa to keep Scat with which he lets her keep her, with Scat having new owners, Santa continues on his journey as Mr. Dumpty rides back into the sky with his friend the moon.

== Cast ==
- Lacey Chabert as Jill, Jack's older sister
- Joseph Ashton as Jack, Jill's protective younger brother
- Raphael Sbarge as Tom Piper
- Cathy Cavadini as Mary
- Charles Nelson Reilly as Mr. Humpty Dumpty
- Susan Silo as Scat, Barnaby's tattered orange cat
- Jim Belushi as Gonzargo, Rodrigo's pudgy dim-witted sidekick and one of the two pirate crooks hired by Barnaby to destroy the toy factory. He wears a sailor uniform.
- Bronson Pinchot as Rodrigo, an Italian-accented criminal pirate who was hired by Barnaby alongside his sidekick Gonzargo to destroy the toy factory. He has a hook prosthesis as a replacement for his right hand that was chopped off by his former pirate boss, Black Eye.
- Christopher Plummer as Barnaby Crookedman, the cruel estranged uncle/legal guardian of Jill and Jack and the main antagonist.
- Lindsay Schnebly as Goblin King
- Beth Anderson / Amick Byram / Susan Boyd / Jon Joyce as additional singing voices (uncredited)
- Randy Crenshaw / Kevin Dorsey / Gary Falcone as Singing candles (uncredited)

== Musical numbers ==
1. "Toyland" – Mr. Dumpty
2. "Mr. Dumpty's Toyland / The Aerial Ballet" – Mr. Dumpty
3. "Dream" – Jill, Jack, Mary and Tom
4. "The Factory Song" – Tom, Mary and Company
5. "A Crooked Man" – Barnaby
6. "The Worst Is Yet to Come" – Gonzargo, Rodrigo and Goblin King
7. "It's You" – Tom and Mary
8. "Toyland" (Reprise) – Mr. Dumpty

== Release ==
Originally intended for theatrical release, MGM/UA Home Video issued Babes in Toyland direct-to-video on October 14, 1997.

== Reception ==
TV Guide rated it 3/5 stars and called it "fine entertainment for its intended audience". In criticizing its old source material as irrelevant to modern audiences, Bill Gibron of DVD Verdict described it as "a waste of time and talent".

== See also ==
- List of Christmas films
