= Christoph Hartmut Bluth =

Scholar of international relations

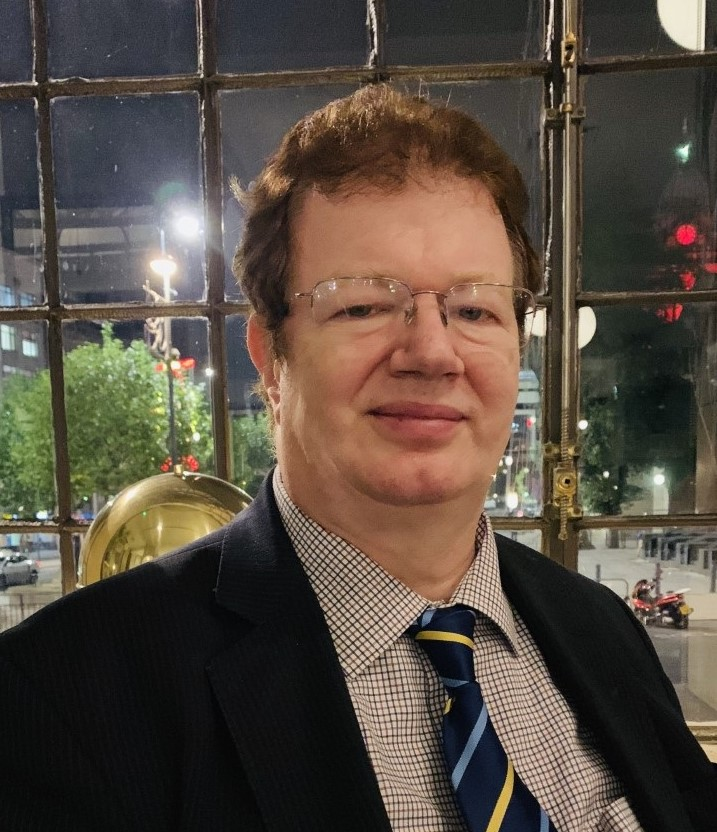
Christoph Bluth

Christoph Hartmut Bluth FRHistS is a professor of international relations and security at the University of Bradford.

== Family and education ==
Christoph Bluth was born in Frankfurt and grew up in North Rhine-Westphalia. He is the son of Winfried Bluth who was an evangelical Christian and a publishing consultant. He studied at Trinity College Dublin, where he completed a BA in mathematics (1980) and an MPhil in ecumenical theology (1984). His master's thesis, Just War Theory and the Falklands/Malvinas Conflict, was supervised by Bill McSweeney; its conclusions were published in the Journal of Peace Research. At King's College London, he conducted research for his PhD thesis on "Soviet Strategic Arms Policy under Khrushchev" under the supervision of Lawrence Freedman at the Department of War Studies.

== Career ==
At the age of 18, Bluth published his first book, Der Ursprung des Lebens ("The origin of life"), a creationist critique of evolutionary theory. After he completed his undergraduate studies he worked as the representative from Northern Ireland for the Student Christian Movement.

Bluth's work has focussed on the role of nuclear weapons and the risks of nuclear proliferation in global security. His early work studied the Soviet Union. Subsequently, he worked on US-Russian cooperation on nuclear security and safety in the context of the Nunn-Lugar programme on co-operative denuclearization.

Bluth's recent work on nuclear proliferation has been controversial for his view that nuclear proliferation is rare and that the spread of nuclear weapons has been less critical to international security than is often claimed. He states that his work in peace studies has been dedicated to education and research in international security studies, with the purpose of providing insights that contribute to the understanding of the risks of nuclear war and paths towards removing nuclear weapons from international relations in the future.

== Publications ==
- Bluth, Christoph (1992). Soviet Strategic Arms Policy before SALT. Cambridge University Press. ISBN 978-0-521-40372-6. OCLC 23584478.
- Bluth, Christoph (2000). The Nuclear Challenge: US-Russian Strategic Relations after the Cold War. London: Routledge. ISBN 1-315-19432-5. OCLC 1003953605.
- Bluth, Christoph (2000). Germany and the Future of European Security. St. Martin's Press. ISBN 1-4039-0522-3. OCLC 52275481.
- Bluth, Christoph (31 October 2002). The Two Germanies and Military Security in Europe. Palgrave Macmillan. doi:10.1057/9780230288003. ISBN 978-0-230-28800-3. S2CID 153183160.
- Crisis on the Korean Peninsula, Dulles Va, Potomac Books 2011
- US Foreign Policy in the Caucasus and Central Asia: Politics, Energy and Security (I.B. Tauris 2014)
- Security, Culture and Human Rights in South Asia and the Middle East, Global Research Publications 2019
