= DF 05 Live =

Live album by Sonia & Disappear Fear
- Released: 18 October 2005
- Recorded: April 11–July 9, 2005
- Genre: Indie Folk, Americana
- Length: 72:26
- Language: English
- Label: Disappear Records
- Producer: Sonia Rutstein

Sonia & Disappear Fear chronology
No Bomb Is Smart (2004)	DF 05 Live (2005)	Tango (2007)

DF 05 Live (stylized as DF 05 LiVE) is the first live album and first overall album by American folk band Sonia & Disappear Fear. The album was released on October 18, 2005 by Sonia Rutstein's own Disappear Records label. The songs on the album span across Sonia's solo career as well as the earlier incarnation of her band, Disappear Fear.

== Track listing ==
All tracks are written by Sonia Rutstein, unless otherwise noted.

No.	Title	Writer(s)	Length
1.	"The Other Man"		5:20
2.	"Is There Anybody Here?"	Phil Ochs	3:40
3.	"B.Y.O.G." (Bring Your Own God)		4:41
4.	"Ride This Ride"		3:00
5.	"Be the One"		4:32
6.	"Washington Work Song"		5:05
7.	"No Bomb Is Smart" (Intro)		0:59
8.	"No Bomb Is Smart"		3:56
9.	"Won't Let Go" (Intro)		0:37
10.	"Won't Let Go"		3:26
11.	"Rio's Home"		4:43
12.	"Fix My Life"		4:53
13.	"Opinion #33"		5:12
14.	"Obviously"		3:26
15.	"Biggest Baddest Heart"		3:17
16.	"Fallin'"		4:04
17.	"Me, Too"		5:01
18.	"Sexual Telepathy"		3:37
19.	"Dalis" (Intro)		0:21
20.	"Play the Music"		5:56
Total length:			77:26

== Personnel ==
Sonia & Disappear Fear

- Laura Cerulli - percussionist, backing vocals
- Angela L. Edge - bass, trumpet
- Sonia Rutstein (SONiA) - lead vocals, guitar, piano, harmonica
