= Blood, Bones & Baltimore =

Studio album by Sonia & Disappear Fear
- Released: 9 March 2010
- Recorded: November 11–12, 2009 @ The Deep End Studio; Baltimore, MD
- Genre: Blues; Americana
- Length: 35:22
- Language: English
- Label: Disappear Records
- Producer: Sonia Rutstein, Tony Correlli

Sonia & Disappear Fear chronology
Splash (2009)	Blood, Bones & Baltimore (2010)	Get Your Phil (2011)

Blood, Bones & Baltimore is the second studio album by American folk band Sonia & Disappear Fear also known as the "Disappear Fear Orchestra" on this album. It was released on March 9, 2010 by Sonia's own Disappear Records label. The album was recorded on November 11 and 12, 2009. The majority of which was mixed on December 16 and 17, 2009 at The Deep End Studio located in Baltimore, MD.

== Track listing ==
All tracks are written by Sonia Rutstein, unless otherwise noted.

No.	Title	Writer(s)	Length
1.	"Honey Money"		2:39
2.	"Biggest Baddest Heart"		5:02
3.	"Gimme the Keys"		3:39
4.	"Don't Make Me Wrong"		3:02
5.	"Pack of Newport"		3:10
6.	"Don't Waste My Crime"		3:32
7.	"You Got Me"		3:48
8.	"Who I Am (Say Amen)"		3:58
9.	"Call Me Sonia"		2:54
10.	"Worried Man Blues"	Woody Guthrie	3:18
Total length:			35:22

== Personnel ==
Sonia & Disappear Fear

- Sonia Rutstein (SONiA) - lead vocals, guitar, harmonica
- Howard Markman - lead guitar, vocals on "Biggest Baddest Heart"
- Laura Cerulli - drums, vocals on "Pack of Newport" and "Biggest Baddest Heart", backing vocals
- Helen Hausmann - violin, backing vocals
- Michael Bowie - upright bass
- Seth Kibel - tenor sax, baritone sax, flute, clarinet
- Cindy Frank (CiNDY) - vocals on "Who I Am (Say Amen)"
- Dylan Visvikis - backing vocals on "Who I Am (Say Amen)", piano on "Don't Make Me Wrong"
- Tony Correlli - piano on "Don't Waste My Crime", engineer
