= Disappear Fear =

US musical group

- Also known as: Sonia, Sonia & Disappear Fear, Disappear Fear Orchestra
- Origin: Baltimore, Maryland, United States
- Genres: Indie folk, Indie pop, Americana, Latin American, Blues, World
- Years active: 1987–present
- Labels: Disappear Records, Rounder/Philo Records
- Members: Sonia Rutstein (SONiA),
- Past members: Michael Bowie; Laura Cerulli; Don Conoscenti; Debbie Flood; Susan Charnley; Issac Tabor; Helen Hausman; Seth Kibel; Brian Simms; Marc Lawrence; Howard Markman; Christopher Sellman; Dylan Visvikis; Glenn Workman; Cindy Frank
- Website: www.soniadf.com

Disappear Fear (stylized as disappear fear) is an American indie pop/indie folk/Americana/world beat band formed in Baltimore, Maryland, in 1987.

== Biography ==
Disappear Fear is a songwriter, a band, a visual artist named Sonia Rutstein. Sonia hails from Baltimore, Maryland in the USA. Sonia has received many awards, including the Coin of Honor from the US Army for her humanitarian efforts, and the GLAAD award for Best Album. Sonia has shared the stage with many of her heroes, including Bruce Springsteen (Light of Day, Jan 2014) and Pete Seeger (Clearwater). When asked about her sound, Sonia reports: “I would say I think my voice is somewhere between Patti Smith and Perry Como; and my guitar style has a Gypsy Kings/Richie Havens flavor. The songs are mine but you can hear some Beatles and Springsteen. It's really all about the energy—like a bird jumping off a window ledge. It's in that split second of trust and light and talent and God."

The original band, formed in 1987, consisted of sisters Sonia Rutstein a.k.a. SONiA and Cindy Frank a.k.a. CiNDY, and expanded the following year to include guitarist Howard Markman. Their lyrics often addressed love, life, Baltimore, LGBT rights, and progressive political issues. The pair released six albums as a duo. (According to the band's official website bio, more than a half million copies of Disappear Fear records have been sold through 2009.) In 1994, after self-releasing their music via their own Disappear Records label, the band was signed to Rounder/Philo Records. Two years later, Cindy stopped performing regularly with the band in order to focus on her growing family. Cindy's teen son Dylan Visvikis has shared his talents on vocals and piano. From about 1996 through 2004, Sonia started a solo career that took her across the nation and around the globe. She released four LPs under her own name and established herself in the world of LGBT, Lilith Fair, and alt-folk artists. Rutstein has participated either alone or with the band in events including the March on Washington for Lesbian, Gay and Bi Equal Rights and Liberation and the Concert for Peace at the Lincoln Memorial in Washington, DC with Peter, Paul and Mary (March 2003). Her performing destinations have taken her as far away as Jerusalem (where she toured bomb shelters), Fiji, and Australia's Sydney Opera House. The newest Disappear Fear recording is 2013's Broken Film, an album steeped in folk, pop and Americana sounds. Playing on the album are Sonia (songwriter, lead vocals, acoustic guitar, harmonica, piano), Elaine Romanelli (background vocals and organ), Don Conoscenti (electric guitar), Don Kerce (Bass), Dylan Visvikis (background vocals, piano), Helen Hausmann (violins, spoons), Jeff Gilkinson (cello), Laura Cerulli (percussion vocals), and Mike Poole (piano). Recorded in Nashville at the Brown Cow, from this CD was borne a successful 18-city tour with the full disappear fear band. SONiA's latest solo album is By My Silence. Released in late 2018, it reflects her mostly positive experience touring in Europe, but also, after being re-routed on her tour by right-wing nationalist marches, renews her commitment to sing out against antisemitism. Opening the album is A Voice for Nudem Durak, in support of a young woman jailed in Turkey on a 19.5 years sentence for singing in her native Kurdish language.

Rutstein's 2006 Middle East tour led to the founding of Guitars for Peace, a non-profit foundation that delivers instruments to children in impoverished or war-torn nations.

== Soundtrack appearances ==
Sonia's songs are featured in the teen movie Frog and Wombat and in the independent film Wave Babes. Sonia also scored the entire soundtrack for Dave Marshall's documentary film Autumn's Harvest. Released for first time in 2018 on Terror Vision Records was Sonia's score for Igor and the Lunatics, a 1985 horror film. Most of the soundtrack was recorded with her band at the time, Exhibit A. The musical "small house no secrets" (composer Sonia Rutstein) was presented in March 2019 in Baltimore. The songs were available on the CD "small house no secrets – composer´s cut" by SONiA disappear fear

== Awards and nominations ==
Rutstein won the award for Best Female Artist of the Year in 1999 for Almost Chocolate and her Me, Too won for Best Acoustic Album in 2001. The band's eponymous album won the Gay and Lesbian Alliance Against Defamation Media Award for Best Album in 1994. Both No Bomb Is Smart and Tango garnered multiple Grammy Award nominations for Rutstein in the pop and folk categories. In 2002, the Santa Cruz Guitar Company created its "SONiA" model guitar in Rutstein's honor.

== Discography ==
=== Disappear Fear ===
- Echo My Call (1988)
- Deep Soul Diver (1990)
- Disappear Fear (1994)
- Live at the Bottom Line (1994)
- Seed in the Sahara (1996)
- Get Your Phil (2011)
- Broken Film (2013)

=== SONiA ===
- Almost Chocolate (1998)
- Me, Too (1999)
- Live at the Down Home (2001)
- No Bomb Is Smart (2004)

=== SONiA & Disappear Fear ===
- DF 05 Live (2005)
- Tango (2007)
- Splash (2009)
- Blood, Bones & Baltimore (2010)

=== SONiA disappear fear ===
- SONiA disappear fear – LiVE at MAXiMAL (2016), solo DoCD recorded in Rodgau, Germany
- By My Silence (2019)
- small house no secrets – composer´s cut (2019)
- "Two Eggs Over Easy" Single EP, from Almost Chocolate, 1998.

== Band members ==
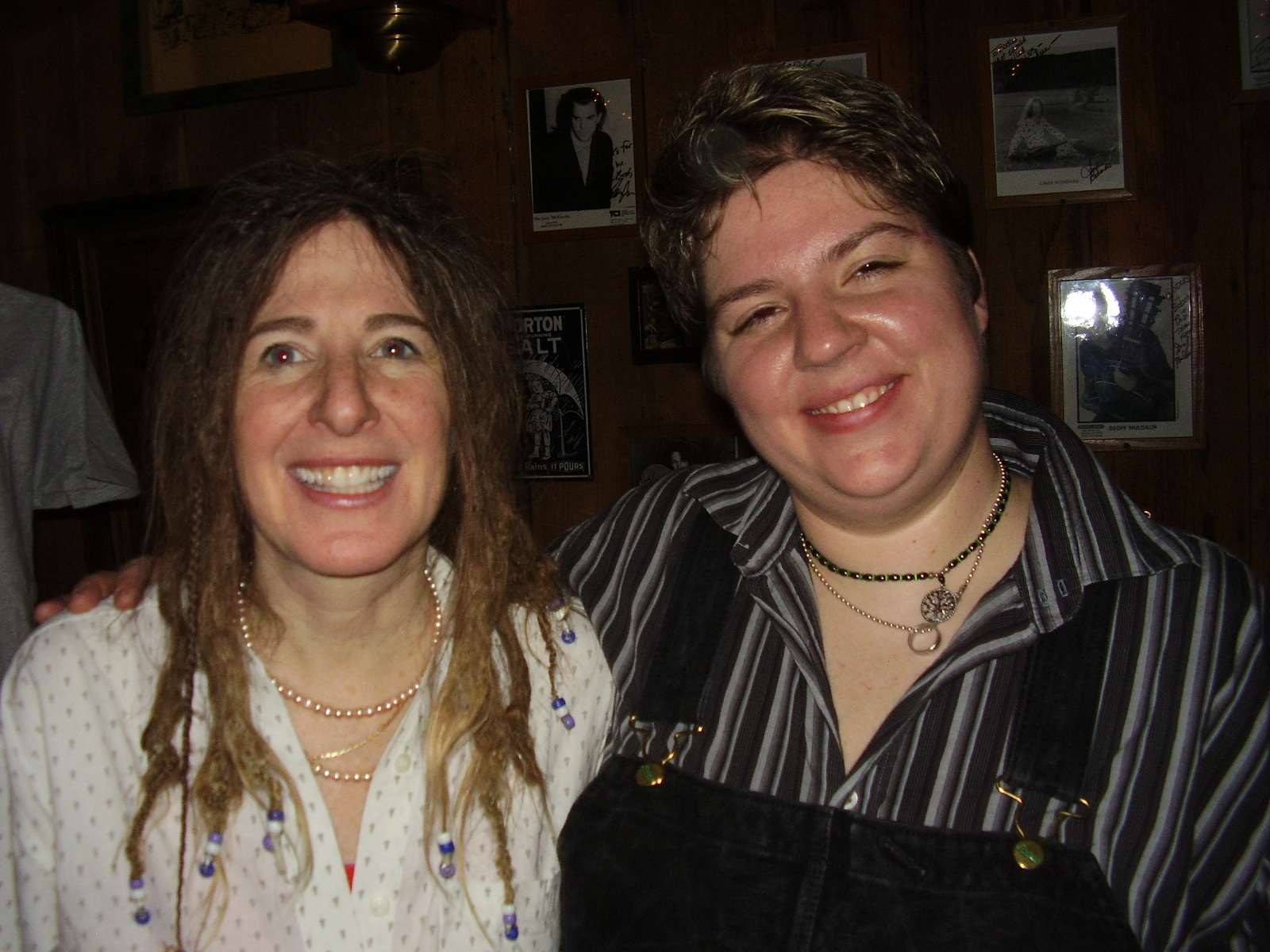
Sonia Rutstein and Laura Cerulli in 2007.

=== Current members ===
Disappear Fear

- Sonia Rutstein (SONiA) – lead vocals, guitar, piano, harmonica (1987–present)

Additional musicians

- Christopher Sellman – bass (1993–1997, 2019)
- Howard Markman – lead, vocals (1988–present)
- Ezell Jones – drums
- Tony Correlli – piano/sound engineer (2010–present)
- Don Conoscenti – lead guitar (2013–present)
- Isaac Tabor – bass, guitar (2013–present)
- Helen Hausmann – violin (2004–present)
- Laura Cerulli – drums/percussion (2005–2013)
- Dylan Visvikis – piano, backing vocals (2010–present)

=== Past members ===
- Michael Bowie – upright bass (2010)
- John Grant – guitar, bass, loops (1987–2007)
- Debbie Flood (drums)
- Susan Charnley (bass)
- Seth Kibel – tenor sax, baritone sax, clarinet, flute (2010)
- Brian Simms – keyboards, accordion, backing vocals (1993–1997)
- Marc Lawrence – drums (1993–1997)
- Dominic Vigliotti – bass
- Cindy Frank (CiNDY) (1987–2019)
- Glenn Workman – keyboards (2008)
