= List of Martial Law episodes =

Complete series DVD cover.

Martial Law is an American crime drama starring Sammo Hung. It premiered on CBS on September 26, 1998 and ended on May 13, 2000, with a total of 44 episodes over the course of 2 seasons.

== Series overview ==
Season	Episodes	Originally released	
Season	Episodes	First released	Last released
1	22	September 26, 1998	May 8, 1999
2	22	September 25, 1999	May 13, 2000

== Episodes ==
=== Season 1 (1998–1999) ===
No. overall	No. in season	Title	Directed by	Written by	Original release date	Viewers (millions)
1	1	"Shanghai Express"	Stanley Tong	Carlton Cuse	September 26, 1998	12.35
Sammo is sent to the United States as part of a cop exchange program, when he tries to find one of his Chinese colleagues who has disappeared while infiltrating an international ring of car thieves.
2	2	"Diamond Fever"	Rick Wallace	Rick Husky	October 3, 1998	11.49
Sammo discovers diamond smuggling done by the Chinese kingpin he came to the US to help capture.
3	3	"Dead Ringers"	Whitney Ransick	Carlton Cuse & Alfred Gough & Miles Millar	October 10, 1998	10.91
Sammo and the unit investigate when competitors in an internet based fighting competition start dying in the ring.
4	4	"Funny Money"	Deran Sarafian	Pam Veasey	October 17, 1998	9.96
Sammo and his partners track a counterfeiting ring.
5	5	"Cop Out"	Whitney Ransick	Alfred Gough & Miles Millar	October 24, 1998	11.45
The unit investigates a group of vigilante cops taking the law into their own hands.: The end of Tammy Lauren's final appearance as Det. Dana Doyle.
6	6	"Extreme Measures"	David Carson	Story by : Josh Appelbaum & André Nemec; Teleplay by : Josh Appelbaum & André Nemec & Carlton Cuse	October 31, 1998	11.20
Sammo and his partners try to locate a missing ex-cop-turned-armored truck guard held captive by a white supremacist group armed with major weapons.
7	7	"Trackdown"	Greg Beeman	Rick Husky	November 7, 1998	11.34
A DA is murdered in a string of burglaries that seem to be tied to a corrupt lawyer.
8	8	"Take Out"	John T. Kretchmer	Patty Lin	November 14, 1998	11.30
A restaurant owner who is a friend of Sammo's is attacked for refusing to sell to a big businessman. Sammo tries to open an account at the local bank.: Shannon Lee, daughter of Martial Arts film star Bruce Lee, plays a role in this episode as Sammo's goddaughter Vanessa.
9	9	"How Sammo Got His Groove Back"	Larry Shaw	Russel Friend & Garrett Lerner	November 21, 1998	11.14
Sammo and the others investigate when an up-and-coming rapper (Ginuwine) is shot by an assassin. They team up with Terrell Parker, the rapper's uncle and an LAPD press lieutenant, and uncover a bootlegging operation involving the rapper's ex-manager.: Arsenio Hall makes his first appearance as Lt. Terrell Parker.
10	10	"Bad Seed"	Jesús Salvador Treviño	Brian Fuld	December 12, 1998	11.26
Sammo and Terrell try to track down Winship's niece who is involved with a robbery gang of delinquents. Louis and Grace investigate a homicide that at first glance seems to be the work of the same gang.
11	11	"Lock-Up"	John Patterson	Kevin Murphy	December 19, 1998	11.61
Sammo and Terrell go undercover in prison to flush out inmates and corrupts guards involved in a gun-smuggling operation.
12	12	"Painted Faces"	Whitney Ransick	Alfred Gough & Miles Millar	January 9, 1999	11.82
A nemesis of Sammo's returns to the United States.
13	13	"Substitutes"	DJ Caruso	Patty Lin	January 23, 1999	12.24
A legendary drug dealer has come to Los Angeles, looking for his ex-wife and son.: Arsenio Hall is upgraded to the main cast.
14	14	"Wildlife"	Whitney Ransick	Russel Friend & Garrett Lerner	February 6, 1999	10.85
Sammo and his partners try to catch an illegal animal trading and hunting ring.
15	15	"Breakout"	Deran Sarafian	Randy Feldman	February 13, 1999	12.15
A prisoner escapes from jail and looks for the money that he and his partners stole 5 years earlier.
16	16	"Captive Hearts"	Michael Lange	Del Shores	February 20, 1999	11.69
Sammo and Terrell is after a ring of sweatshop criminals who might be selling their workers' babies.
17	17	"Trifecta"	Greg Beeman	Pam Veasey & Mark Haskell Smith	February 27, 1999	11.51
A former partner of Terrell's is found murdered.
18	18	"Big Trouble"	Jack Clements	Alfred Gough & Miles Millar	March 20, 1999	10.81
A supermarket owned by Terrell's parents is being threatened by corrupt truckers.
19	19	"Nitro Man"	Greg Beeman	Russel Friend & Garrett Lerner	March 27, 1999	8.49
Melanie ends up as a hostage and is kidnapped when her bank is robbed.
20	20	"Red Storm"	Greg Yaitanes	Mark Verheiden	April 24, 1999	10.36
Sammo tries to stop a gang of terrorists at the airport.
21	21	"Requiem: Part 1"	Greg Beeman	Pam Veasey & Del Shores	May 1, 1999	10.36
A Chinese criminal is back in America with his daughter and tries to set up a drug deal to finance his criminal activity.
22	22	"End Game: Part 2"	Michael Lange	Jim Kramer & Mark Haskell Smith	May 8, 1999	10.69
The unit is told that they could be shut down if they do not catch Lee Hei and his daughter.

=== Season 2 (1999–2000) ===
No. overall	No. in season	Title	Directed by	Written by	Original release date	Viewers (millions)
23	1	"Sammo Blammo"	Joe Napolitano	Lee Goldberg & William Rabkin	September 25, 1999	11.11
Sammo is kidnapped by a thief and has a very complex bomb attached to his chest.
24	2	"Thieves Among Thieves"	Oley Sassone	Lisa Klink	October 2, 1999	10.23
Sammo and Terrell goes undercover to catch some jewel thieves.
25	3	"This Shogun for Hire"	Stanley Tong	J. Larry Carroll & David Bennett Caren	October 9, 1999	11.31
A Japanese assassin is hired by a drug dealer to kill a public official.
26	4	"24 Hours"	Bruce Seth Green	Gene F. O'Neill & Noreen Tobin	October 16, 1999	11.03
A prisoner has been given permission to attend his sisters funeral and Sammo and Terrell has been given the assignment of "babysitting" him.
27	5	"Ninety Million Reasons to Die"	Stanley Tong	Jacquelyn Blain	October 23, 1999	10.11
Sammo is kidnapped after 6 million dollars has been mysteriously deposited in his bank account.
28	6	"My Man Sammo"	Ron Satlof	Jacquelyn Blain	October 30, 1999	10.76
Sammo and Terrell arrest some arms dealers, accidentally messing up an Interpol operation.
29	7	"Friendly Skies"	Bruce Seth Green	Lisa Klink	November 6, 1999	9.27
Grace and Terrell are on a flight escorting prisoners to a maximum security prison. A guard pulls a gun and forces them to release the prisoners.
30	8	"Call of the Wild"	Max Tash	David Bennett Carren & J. Larry Carroll	November 13, 1999	9.32
A mild mannered man kills a man in an office. Sammo catches up to him, but he matches Sammo's martial arts skills. His wife says that he did not even know martial arts.
31	9	"Blue Flu"	Oley Sassone	Gene O'Neill & Noreen Tobin	November 20, 1999	10.21
The whole police station is under quarantine after someone releases a virus.
32	10	"Sammo Claus"	Max Tash	Lisa Klink	December 18, 1999	10.00
Robbers dressed as Santa Claus rob a toy store.
33	11	"No Quarter"	Ron Satlof	Paul Bernbaum (Story)	January 8, 2000	8.88
A gang war erupts in LA over a mobster's plan to bring a pro-football team to Los Angeles. If that was not bad enough, Sammo, Terrell, and Amy are demoted by a corrupt councilman to keep them out of his way, who is actually attempting to gain control of this football team for himself and is pulling a scam with parking meters to make enough money to do so.
34	12	"Scorpio Rising"	Bruce Seth Green	Michael Gleason	January 15, 2000	11.47
A crime organization known as Scorpio are threatening various executives of global companies.
35	13	"No Fare"	Chuck Bowman	Paul Bernbaum	January 22, 2000	11.67
Sammo goes stir crazy when he is told to take a week off and offers to drive his neighbors cab. The rest of the team are looking for a jewel thief and a killer off a marine biologist.
36	14	"Dog Day Afternoon"	Bruce Seth Green	Jacquelyn Blain	February 5, 2000	8.41
Sammo looks after a dog after his owner is killed.
37	15	"Deathfist Five: MCU"	Terrence O'Hara	Lisa Klink	February 12, 2000	9.43
An action star wants to follow Sammo and Terrell to make his next movie more authentic. Someone has set fire to the house of a judge.
38	16	"Honor Among Strangers (Part 1)"	Christian I. Nyby II	J. Larry Carroll & David Bennett Carren	February 19, 2000	11.38
A former military group, led by a white supremacist named Cliff Eagleton, rob a bank with automatic weapons and body armor which Lt. P.K. Barret confirms to the Major Crimes Unit that the army was supposed to have scrapped. Grace and Terrell go undercover at a nearby military base to track down the stolen weapons and find who among their personnel is involved with Eagleton. Sammo meets a Texas Ranger named Cordell Walker who has come to Los Angeles to catch Eagleton for the murder of another Texas Ranger, and they soon find that Eagleton intends to use stolen stinger missiles to target foreign businesses in Los Angeles, which gets worse when Barret herself is murdered by Eagleton during one of their raids to stop him. Part 2 of this episode, "The Day of Cleansing", concluded on Walker, Texas Ranger.
39	17	"Freefall"	Oley Sassone	Lee Goldberg & William Rabkin	February 26, 2000	11.44
Spy satellites come crashing down in downtown L.A.
40	18	"The Thrill Is Gone"	Chuck Bowman	Michael Gleason	March 11, 2000	9.54
A designer drug called Thrill hits the streets of Los Angeles.
41	19	"Heartless"	Ron Satlof	David Ehrman	April 22, 2000	9.84
The daughter of the governor is in the hospital waiting for a heart transplant. The heart she is waiting for is stolen when an ambulance is attacked.
42	20	"In the Dark"	Max Tash	David Ehrman	April 29, 2000	8.71
The international crime organization Scorpio tries to rescue a member who is in prison.
43	21	"Final Conflict (Part 1)"	Oley Sassone	Paul Bernbaum	May 6, 2000	9.35
The MCU discover that Scorpio has a personal grudge against Sammo. Scorpio kidnaps Amy and her fiancee and buries them alive in a limo, injures Terrell, and kidnaps Grace.
44	22	"Final Conflict (Part 2)"	Oley Sassone	Lee Goldberg & William Rabkin	May 13, 2000	8.94
Scorpio plans to make a randomly picked plane crash.

== See also ==
- "Play It Again, Sammo", a crossover with Early Edition
- "The Day of Cleansing", a crossover with Walker, Texas Ranger
