= Batman Beyond: Return of the Joker =

2000 superhero film by Curt Geda

- Promotional poster, with the original intended release date of October 31, 2000
- Directed by: Curt Geda
- Screenplay by: Paul Dini
- Story by: Paul Dini; Glen Murakami; Bruce Timm
- Based on: DC Comics characters
- Produced by: Alan Burnett; Paul Dini; Bruce Timm; Glen Murakami
- Starring: Will Friedle; Kevin Conroy; Mark Hamill; Angie Harmon; Melissa Joan Hart
- Edited by: Joe Gall
- Music by: Kristopher Carter
- Production companies: Warner Bros. Family Entertainment; Warner Bros. Animation
- Distributed by: Warner Home Video
- Release dates: December 12, 2000 (Unrated initially released version); April 23, 2002 (PG-13-rated original version)
- Running time: 75 minutes (Unrated initially released version); 78 minutes (PG-13-rated original version)
- Country: United States
- Language: English

Batman Beyond: Return of the Joker (also known as Batman of the Future: Return of the Joker in some territories) is a 2000 American direct-to-video animated superhero film produced by Warner Bros. Family Entertainment and Warner Bros. Animation and distributed by Warner Home Video. It is the third film in the DC Animated Universe and is based on the animated series Batman Beyond, taking place after its third & final season. The film features the original Batman, Bruce Wayne (Kevin Conroy), and his successor, Terry McGinnis (Will Friedle), as they try to unravel the mysterious seeming return of the former's archenemy, the Joker (Mark Hamill).

The film was heavily edited and censored following the 1999 Columbine High School massacre and WB's objection to its content, causing its release to be delayed from Halloween 2000 to December 12, 2000. Subsequently, the PG-13-rated "Original, Uncut Version" was released on DVD on April 23, 2002.

== Plot ==
A new faction of the Jokerz gang—consisting of Bonk, Woof, Ghoul, Chucko, and the Dee-Dee twins—attempts to steal high-tech electronic equipment but is intercepted by Batman (Terry McGinnis), protégé of the original Batman, Bruce Wayne. The gang reports to their leader, the Joker—presumed dead for four decades (Note: The death of the Joker took place at some point after the events of the Justice League Unlimited series finale, "Destroyer", within the timeline of the DC Animated Universe.)—who shoots Bonk to intimidate the surviving members.

Later, the Jokerz disrupt a press conference celebrating Bruce's return to Wayne Enterprises to steal equipment. During the raid, the Joker reveals himself to Bruce, mocking his stupefaction and implying that he knows Bruce was Batman. After fending off the attack, Terry demands information from Bruce and Police Commissioner Barbara Gordon, the former Batgirl, but neither gives him the answers he seeks. Not wanting Terry to face the Joker, Bruce orders him to return the Batsuit. Terry argues that being Batman makes him a personal exemplar, but Bruce rebukes him, comparing him to his former mentees. Later, the Jokerz ambush Terry and nearly kill his girlfriend, Dana Tan. Meanwhile, the Joker poisons Bruce and his Great Dane, Ace, verifying that he knows all of their secrets.

After Terry saves Bruce's life with an antidote, Barbara finally explains the Joker's disappearance: After Nightwing (Dick Grayson) had left Gotham City for Blüdhaven, (Note: As depicted in the Justice League Unlimited episode "Grudge Match") the Joker and Harley Quinn kidnapped Tim Drake, then Robin and took him to the abandoned Arkham Asylum, where they tortured and drugged him for three weeks. After the Joker learned Batman's secret identity, he warped Tim into his teenage facsimile, scheming for Robin to kill Batman. After Batman and Batgirl found Tim, a battle ensued, during which Tim briefly came to his senses and killed the Joker instead, while Harley fell down a ravine and was presumed dead. They buried the Joker beneath the asylum, and only Barbara's father and predecessor, James Gordon, knew of the incident. Over the next year, Tim recovered with help from Bruce's family friend Leslie Thompkins, but was forced to retire from superheroics by the latter, and severed ties with him, leaving to make it on his own.

As Batman, Terry visits Tim, now a successful telecommunications engineer with a family, who voices bitterness towards his past but denies involvement in the Joker's return. Terry's next suspect is Jordan Pryce, a Wayne Enterprises executive who hates Bruce for ruining his chance to take over the company. He finds that Pryce isn't the Joker but conspired with him to kill Bruce. When a directed-energy weapon strikes Pryce's yacht, Terry rescues him before turning him over to the police. In the Batcave, after realizing the Joker only destroyed the Robin costume, Terry recalls Tim's grudge against his old persona and deduces he must be involved. Cross-referencing Tim's telecom expertise with the Jokerz' thefts, Terry and Bruce discover that their stolen equipment can assemble an uplink-jammer that seizes control of a laser-armed military satellite.

When Terry goes to face Tim at his workplace, he triggers a trap set by the Joker, who leads him to an abandoned candy factory. Subduing the Jokerz with Ace's help, Terry confronts Tim, who subdues Terry by disabling his Batsuit and then transforms into the Joker as Bruce watches in horror from the Batcave through Terry's Batsuit. The Joker reveals that he encoded himself into an advanced, stolen (Note: The Justice League Unlimited episode "Epilogue" revealed that the Joker stole technology from Project Cadmus, implying it happened during the Justice League episode "Wild Cards.") DNA microarray hidden behind Tim’s ear—a contingency plan in case he didn't survive his final battle with Batman. This biotechnology allows him to survive death by taking over Tim's body permanently. Since his return, the Joker has plotted a devastating victory over Batman. He aims to use the satellite to kill Bruce and Terry's loved ones before decimating Gotham City. Leveraging Bruce's insight that the Joker is driven by vanity, Terry taunts the villain during their battle, forcing him to drop his guard and play by Terry's rules. The enraged Joker uses his grenades to blast Terry down from the rafters, pins him down to deliver the killing blow. Terry seizes the opportunity to press the Joker's own lethal joy buzzer against the biochip, destroying the Joker's digitized code. He and Ace rescue an unconscious Tim just as the lair detonates with the uplink-jammer.

Following the Jokerz' arrests, Barbara hides Tim's complicity to protect him while the Joker is declared dead. The Dee-Dee twins are bailed out of jail by their grandmother, elderly, reformed Harley Quinn, who survived the fall. While Tim recovers in the hospital, Bruce finally makes amends with him and Barbara. Together, they validate Terry's worthiness of the Batman legacy, acknowledging his courage against the Joker.

== Voice cast ==
- Will Friedle as Terry McGinnis / Batman
- Kevin Conroy as Bruce Wayne / Batman
- Angie Harmon as Commissioner Barbara Gordon
  - Tara Strong as Young Barbara Gordon / Batgirl
- Dean Stockwell as Tim Drake
  - Mathew Valencia as Young Tim Drake / Robin
  - Andrea Romano as Joker Jr. / J.J (credited as "Laughing Boy")
- Mark Hamill as Joker and Jordan Pryce
- Arleen Sorkin as Harleen Quinzel / Harley Quinn and Amy
- Melissa Joan Hart as Delia and Deidre Dennis / Dee Dee
- Michael Rosenbaum as Stewart Carter Winthrop III / Ghoul
- Don Harvey as Charles Buntz / Chucko
- Henry Rollins as Benjamin Knox / Bonk
- Frank Welker as Woof and Ace the Bat-Hound
- Lauren Tom as Dana Tan
- Rachael Leigh Cook as Chelsea Cunningham
- Teri Garr as Mary McGinnis
- Ryan O'Donohue as Matthew "Matt" McGinnis
- Vernee Watson-Johnson as Ms. Joyce Carr
- Mary Scheer as Mrs. Drake
- Jason Stanford as a Gangster

== Production ==
The Joker's death in the PG-13 "theatrical" version of the film (top) compared to his death in the unrated television version (bottom)

The film was initially put into production after the cancellation of Boyd Kirkland's Batman: Arkham, the intended sequel to Batman & Mr. Freeze: SubZero. When Bruce Timm and Glen Murakami were given the greenlight to produce a Batman Beyond feature-length film, they decided to use the extra time to answer questions pertaining to the time period between Beyond and Batman: The Animated Series.

The animation was outsourced to TMS Entertainment in Japan. It is also the first Batman direct-to-video animated film to use digital ink and paint.

Dwayne McDuffie, writer for the DCAU series Static Shock, Justice League and Justice League Unlimited, stated that the events of the flashback sequence in the film take place at the end of the present-day timeline of the DCAU, following the end of Justice League Unlimited but prior to the start of Batman Beyond.

== Release ==
Return of the Joker was originally set for release on Halloween 2000, but following the backlash against violence in children's media that resulted from the Columbine High School massacre in 1999, and general apprehension by the higher-ups at WB over the film's content, the creative team was forced to make edits that delayed its release to December 12, 2000.

The most dramatic change was the method of the Joker's death. In the original version of the film, he is impaled by a flag shot out of a handgun by Tim Drake, while in the alternate version of the film that was initially released, he is electrocuted after becoming tangled in water tubing. Similarly, the uncensored version has Bonk being killed in the same manner as the Joker, while in the censored version, Joker instead blasts him with Joker Venom gas, leaving him catatonic. Nearly two years after the film's initial release, and following online petitions, Warner Home Video released the uncut and unaltered version of Return of the Joker.

While the alternate version released in 2000 was not rated, the PG-13-rated original version was the first animated Batman film to receive a PG-13 rating from the Motion Picture Association (then-named the Motion Picture Association of America), as well as the only PG-13-rated film to be released under Warner Bros' now-defunct Warner Bros Family Entertainment label. The film also aired in an edited format on August 9, 2002 on Cartoon Network's Toonami block.

The PG-13-rated original version was released on Blu-ray on April 5, 2011.

The alternate version became available on HBO Max internationally.

== Marketing ==
A comic adaptation of the film was released in February 2001, drawn by Craig Rousseau. The page depicting the Joker's death had to be redone in accordance with the edits made to the film. A tie-in video game was released in 2000 for Game Boy Color, PlayStation, and Nintendo 64. Scholastic released a novelization of the film, written by Michael Teitelbaum, on October 1, 2000.

== Music ==
Batman Beyond: Return of the Joker Soundtrack

Soundtrack album by Various artists
- Released: October 17, 2000
- Genre: Rock
- Length: 38:13
- Label: Rhino Records

Professional ratings
Review scores
Source	Rating
AllMusic	3/5 stars

Released on October 17, 2000, the soundtrack to Batman Beyond: Return of the Joker contains music composed and conducted by Kristopher Carter, as well as two tracks of music featured in the direct-to-video film.

All tracks are written by Kristopher Carter.

No.	Title	Performers	Length
1.	"Batman Beyond: Return of the Joker (Main Title)"	Kristopher Carter	02:10
2.	"Industrial Heist"	Kristopher Carter	03:48
3.	"Meet the Joker"	Kristopher Carter	02:47
4.	"Joker Crashes Bruce's Party"	Kristopher Carter	01:19
5.	"Terry Relieved of Duty"	Kristopher Carter	01:54
6.	"Nightclub Fight / Terry Rescues Bruce"	Kristopher Carter	04:39
7.	"A Trap for Tim"	Kristopher Carter	01:26
8.	"Joker Family Portrait"	Kristopher Carter	02:05
9.	"Arkham Mayhem"	Kristopher Carter	03:31
10.	"Batman Defeats the Jokerz"	Kristopher Carter	01:36
11.	"Joker Meets His End (Again)"	Kristopher Carter	04:21
12.	"Healing Old Wounds"	Kristopher Carter	02:03
13.	"Crash (The Humble Brothers Remix)"	Mephisto Odyssey (feat. Static-X)	03:26
14.	"Batman Beyond: Return of the Joker (End Title)"	Kenny Wayne Shepherd	03:02
Total length:			38:13

== Critical reception ==
On the review aggregator website Rotten Tomatoes, 100% of 10 critics' reviews are positive, with an average rating of 8/10. The website's consensus reads: "This feature length entry in the Batman Beyond mythos sends off the Mark Hamill-voiced Joker in thrilling fashion, hitting the same caped crusading peaks of the original series."

Nisha Gopalan of Entertainment Weekly praised the original version of the film, in particular how it "sheds light on the dark, obsessive relationship between the villain and his vigilante counterpart." Gerry Shamray of Sun Newspapers said that Return of the Joker "would have made a great live-action Batman movie." Ryan Cracknell of Apollo Guide called the film "an animated masterpiece."

Peter Canavese of Groucho Reviews called it an "energetic and unsettling Batman adventure," adding that it "provides a memorable showcase for Hamill's celebrated take on the Joker, and allows both McGinnis and Wayne to see action and face emotional challenges." Michael Stailey of DVD Verdict gave the original version a score of 92 out of 100, calling it "a taut, high-impact film" and "a must-buy to Bat-fans and animation lovers alike."

Garth Franklin of Dark Horizons had a mixed response when reviewing the original version, saying that "the script is pretty solid, the animation superb, and the voice performances all work well," but added that "the Terry character's personal scenes aren't anywhere near as engaging [as the scenes featuring the Joker or Bruce Wayne], and the investigative subplot doesn't work as well as it should." Jeremy Conrad of IGN gave the 2002 DVD release of the original version a score of 9 out of 10 for the movie itself, 6 out of 10 each for video and audio, and 8 out of 10 for extras, adding up to an overall score of 7 out of 10.

=== Accolades ===
Award	Category	Subject	Result	Ref.
Annie Award	Best Animated Home Entertainment Production		Won	
Annie Award	Directing in a Feature Production	Curt Geda	Nominated	
Annie Award	Writing in a Feature Production	Paul Dini, Glen Murakami, and Bruce Timm	Nominated	
Annie Award	Voice Acting in a Feature Production	Mark Hamill	Nominated	
DVD Exclusive Award	Best Animated Character Performance	Mark Hamill	Won	
