= Splash (Sonia & Disappear Fear album) =

Compilation album by Sonia & Disappear Fear
- Released: 16 January 2009
- Recorded: 1994–2008
- Genre: Indie folk, indie pop, Americana, Latin American, world
- Length: 42:22
- Language: English, Spanish, Hebrew, Arabic
- Label: Disappear Records; Rounder/Philo Records
- Producer: Danny Bernini; John Grant; Craig Krampf; Sonia Rutstein

Sonia & Disappear Fear chronology
Tango (2007)	Splash (2009)	Blood, Bones & Baltimore (2010)

Splash is a retrospective album by the American folk band Sonia & Disappear Fear, released on January 16, 2009 by Sonia's own Disappear Records label and Rounder/Philo Records. The album is composed of songs from Sonia's solo career as well as the earlier incarnation of her band, simply known as Disappear Fear.

== Track listing ==
All songs performed by Sonia & Disappear Fear, unless otherwise noted.

All tracks are written by Sonia Rutstein, unless otherwise noted.

No.	Title	Writer(s)	Artist	Length
1.	"Porque Estamos Aqui" ("Because We're Here") (from Tango)			4:44
2.	"Mica Moca" ("Who Is Greater") (from Tango)			3:19
3.	"Shorashim" ("Roots") (from Tango)			3:33
4.	"Who's So Scared" (from Disappear Fear)	Countee Cullen & Rutstein	Disappear Fear	6:51
5.	"2 Eggs Over Easy" (from Almost Chocolate)		Sonia	4:12
6.	"Won't Let Go" (from No Bomb Is Smart)		Sonia	3:13
7.	"Play the Music" (from Disappear Fear)		Disappear Fear	5:58
8.	"Obviously" (from No Bomb Is Smart)		Sonia	3:52
9.	"The Other Man" (from No Bomb Is Smart)		Sonia	4:33
10.	"Love Names Me"	Blake Althen & Rutstein		1:12
11.	"By My Silence"	Martin Niemöller, Ellen Bukstel & Nick Annis		2:55
Total length:				42:22

Track info

- Track 4 is based on a verse by Harlem Renaissance poet Countee Cullen.
- Tracks 10 & 11 are previously unreleased songs.
- Track 11 is based on the poem by Pastor Martin Niemöller written during the Holocaust.

== Personnel ==
Sonia & Disappear Fear

- Sonia Rutstein (SONiA) - lead vocals, guitar, piano, harmonica
- Cindy Frank (CiNDY) - vocals
- Howard Markman - guitar
- Laura Cerulli - percussionist, backing vocals
- John Grant - electric guitar, acoustic guitar, bass, programming
- Christopher Sellman - bass
