= Frog and Wombat =

1998 film

- Directed by: Laurie Agard
- Written by: Laurie Agard
- Produced by: Laurie Agard; Nina Diamond
- Starring: Emily Lipoma; Katie Stuart; Ronny Cox; Lindsay Wagner
- Cinematography: Ray Preziosi
- Edited by: Laurel Ladevich; Chris Ross Leong; Sam Longoria
- Music by: Greg Edmonson; Sonia Rutstein
- Production company: Pigtail Productions
- Distributed by: Eagle Entertainment; Showcase Entertainment
- Release date: December 18, 1998
- Running time: 105 minutes
- Country: United States
- Language: English

Frog and Wombat is a 1998 independent children's film written and directed by Laurie Agard, about two 12-year-old girls named Jane and Allison who investigate a murder in their hometown, which they believe was committed by the middle school principal. Their investigations become more and more involved, to the point where they sneak into the principal's car and hide in it to reach his house. As they get closer to discovering the truth, he kidnaps Allison. But before he can take her to a mental hospital while outrunning Jane in a golf cart, she bashes his car and causes it to collide with a tree by coming to her rescue. The principal is arrested, taken to the police station by the police officers, and imprisoned in a county jail for kidnapping Allison.

The title derives from the nicknames the girls use over a walkie-talkie, as they refer to themselves and each other as "Frog" and "Wombat".

== Cast ==
- Emily Lipoma as Jane 'Wombat' Walker
- Katie Stuart as Allison 'Frog' Parker
- Ronny Cox as Principal Larry Struble
- Lindsay Wagner as Sydney Parker
