= Jason Stanford (actor) =

American actor (born 1954)

Jason Stanford (born 14 April 1954 in the United States) is an American actor.

Stanford started his career in 1977 while playing in The Love Boat. In the 1980s, he began starring on popular television series like Dallas and Hunter.

In the 1990s, Stanford started making dubbing voices, such as the movie Highlander III: The Sorcerer and in 2000 the actor became committed to dubbing, performing such parts as the voice of Jerry in Totally Spies and that of Bugs Bunny in Baby Looney Tunes.

In 2007, Stanford returned to live action with the famous role of Brooks Chambers in the series Hitman, Despite her Killer. In 2008, however, he returned to doubling in Cloudy with a Chance of Meatballs.

== Filmography ==
- 1977: The Love Boat - Season 1
- 1978: The Love Boat - Season 2
- 1979: Eight Is Enough - Season 4
- 1981: Eight Is Enough - Season 5
- 1983: The A-Team - Season 2
- 1984: Dallas - Season 8
- 1985: The Fall Guy - Season 5
- 1988: Hunter - Season 5
- 1990: Roseanne - Season 3
- 1992: Murder, She Wrote - Season 9
- 1994: Friends - Season 1
- 1995: JAG - Season 1
- 1995: Highlander III: The Sorcerer by Andrew Morahan
- 1997-1998: Homicide: Life on the Street - Seasons 6 & 7
- 1997: Pokémon, I Choose You! (TV)
- 1999: Beverly Hills 90210 - Season 10
- 2000: Batman Beyond: Return of the Joker by Curt Geda
- 2001-2006: Totally Spies! - Seasons 1–5
- 2002-2005: Baby Looney Tunes - Seasons 1 & 2
- 2002: Kim Possible - Season 1
- 2007-2008: Hitman, despite her killer - Season 1 & 2
- 2009: Cloudy with a Chance of Meatballs by Phil Lord and Chris Miller
- 2010: Toy Story 3 by Lee Unkrich
