= Get Your Phil =

Studio album by Disappear Fear
- Released: 4 July 2011
- Genre: Folk, Americana
- Length: language = English
- Label: Disappear Records
- Producer: John Jacob

Disappear Fear chronology
Blood, Bones & Baltimore (2010)	Get Your Phil (2011)

Get Your Phil is the sixth studio album released by Disappear Fear. This release marks the return of the harmonizing vocals of sisters: Sonia Rutstein (SONiA) and Cindy Frank (CiNDY); which have not been featured since the group's 1996 album, Seed in the Sahara. The album has been described as, "100% made in America, folk music." All tracks are songs written by Phil Ochs, except for "Because the Night" which was penned by Patti Smith and Bruce Springsteen. The album was released on July 4, 2011. Cindy said of the release date, "We think a new anti-war album released on Independence Day is a great idea and we hope that Phil would be proud." The majority of the instrumentation on the album is done by Sonia. She plays the acoustic guitar, piano and harmonica. The album was engineered and produced by Grammy nominee, John Jacob.

== Track listing ==
All tracks are written by Phil Ochs, unless otherwise noted.

No.	Title	Writer(s)	Length
1.	"Power and the Glory"		2:46
2.	"Changes"		3:43
3.	"I've Had Her/Because the Night" (*Patti Smith Group cover)	Patti Smith & Bruce Springsteen	7:36
4.	"There but for Fortune"		2:59
5.	"I Ain't Marching Anymore"		2:32
6.	"No More Songs"		3:08
7.	"Outside of a Small Circle of Friends"		4:09
8.	"Is There Anybody Here?"		3:50
9.	"Draft Dodger Rag"		2:32
10.	"When I'm Gone"		4:30
Total length:			37:45

== Personnel ==
Disappear Fear

- Sonia Rutstein (SONiA) – vocals, acoustic guitar, piano, harmonica
- Cindy Frank (CiNDY) – vocals

=== Additional personnel ===
- Tony Correlli – piano, engineer
