= Martial Law (TV series) =

American crime drama comedy television series (1998–2000)

- Genre: Action; Crime; Comedy
- Created by: Carlton Cuse
- Starring: Sammo Hung; Arsenio Hall; Kelly Hu; Louis Mandylor; Tom Wright; Gretchen Egolf; Tammy Lauren
- Country of origin: United States
- Original language: English
- No. of seasons: 2
- No. of episodes: 44 (list of episodes)

Production
- Executive producers: Carlton Cuse; Andre Morgan; Stanley Tong; Lee Goldberg; William Rabkin; Al Ruddy
- Producers: Pam Veasey; Jack Clements; Jacquelyn Blain; Barry Steinberg
- Running time: 42–45 minutes
- Production companies: Carlton Cuse Productions; Ruddy Morgan Productions; 20th Century Fox Television; CBS Productions

Original release
- Network: CBS
- Release: September 26, 1998 – May 13, 2000

Martial Law is an American crime action comedy television series created by Carlton Cuse that was produced by Carlton Cuse Productions, Ruddy Morgan Productions, 20th Century Fox Television and CBS Productions that aired on CBS from September 26, 1998, to May 13, 2000. The title character, Sammo Law (Sammo Hung), is a Chinese law officer and martial arts expert who comes to Los Angeles in search of a colleague and remains in the United States.

The show was a surprise hit, making Hung the only East Asian headlining a primetime network series in the United States. At the time, Hung was not fluent in English and worried about the audience's ability to understand him. In many scenes, Hung does not speak at all, making Martial Law one of the few American television series to feature little dialogue from the lead character. The show lasted two seasons, before being cancelled due to high production costs and Hung being unhappy with the writing of season two.

== Plot ==
The basic storyline is that Sammo Law (Sammo Hung), a well-respected Chinese cop, is transferred to America. As he works for the Los Angeles Police Department, fighting crime in Los Angeles, he is met with a clash in culture. He is also the mentor of Grace "Pei Pei" Chen (Kelly Hu), an undercover officer. When American techniques do not work, Sammo employs some Chinese cop work to get the job done.

=== Season one ===
Sammo is sent by the Chinese government to apprehend an old nemesis, Lee Hei (Tzi Ma). He finds out that his disciple, Pei Pei, had infiltrated Lee Hei's criminal empire. His goal is to capture Lee Hei and end his criminal organization. This plot line was unresolved and season one ended in a cliffhanger, although season two's premiere has Sammo alluding to Lee Hei's death (by way of accusing a one-shot villain of trying to avenge it). He is assisted in this by Grace (who joins the LAPD alongside him), Det. Louis Malone (Louis Mandylor) and Lt. Benjamin Winship (Tom Wright). Det. Dana Dixon (Tammy Lauren) is initially part of the team, but leaves after only five episodes; she is explained to have moved to another police force to be closer to her family. Halfway through the season, Lt. Terrell Parker (Arsenio Hall) joins the team and becomes Sammo's official partner.

=== Season two ===
Following the events of the previous season finale, and prior to the second-season premiere, Winship retires and Louis transfers to the NYPD, while Law decides to stay in Los Angeles and is now partnered with Grace. The department also gets a new captain, Amy Dylan, who thinks that the Chinese way of police work is not the best way of handling things. In addition, revelations are made of a secret society whose members include Law's long-lost son. While Law decided to return to China in the last episode, a line of dialogue leaves open the possibility of a follow-up.

== Episodes ==
Season	Episodes	Originally released	
Season	Episodes	First released	Last released
1	22	September 26, 1998	May 8, 1999
2	22	September 25, 1999	May 13, 2000

"Honor Among Strangers" is part one of a crossover with Walker, Texas Ranger, wherein Sammo teams up with Cordell Walker to apprehend a hate-mongering former military officer who later escapes Walker's custody in the Walker, Texas Ranger episode "The Day of Cleansing" to which he summons Sammo to Dallas to help catch him again.

== Cast ==
- Sammo Hung as Detective-Captain Sammo Law
- Arsenio Hall as Detective-Lieutenant Terrell Parker
- Kelly Hu as Detective Grace "Pei Pei" Chen
- Tammy Lauren as Detective Dana Doyle (season 1 – first five episodes)
- Louis Mandylor as Detective Louis Malone (season 1)
- Tom Wright as Lieutenant Benjamin Winship (season 1)
- Gretchen Egolf as Captain Amy Dylan (season 2)

== Production ==
CBS series poster

=== Season one ===
The creator, Carlton Cuse, was aware that CBS was in need of a show that would attract young male viewers to its Saturday-night schedule. Stanley Tong suggested a cop show based on Police Story 3: Super Cop, a movie that he directed and in which Jackie Chan starred. Jackie Chan was contacted by Tong, but declined (Chan was set to appear in episode five "Cop Out", strolling into the background of one scene, but the bit was cut from the final version).

Shannon Lee also was guest cast as Vanessa Feng in episode eight, "Take Out".

Tong then approached Sammo Hung, a good friend and occasional co-star of Chan's. Still eager to fill the 9 pm program slot, CBS agreed very quickly and production began on the series. After the first six episodes had aired, they knew it was a hit. The production, however, was not without complications, as Hung was used to the control over filming he had in Hong Kong and was not fluent in English. Hung was not delighted to be filming in early mornings and late night that American television productions require.

=== Season two ===
New executive producers Lee Goldberg and William Rabkin took the helm at the beginning of the second season due to runaway production costs. They more or less pretended that the first season did not exist, retaining only the basic concept of a fish-out-of-water detective. Cast members Louis Mandylor and Tom Wright were dropped. Gretchen Egolf was brought in to play the unit's new leader, Amy Dylan, from the beginning of season two. Additionally, Parker's past in public relations was scrapped. The first season's cliffhanger ending (plus the dropping of Mandylor and Wright's characters) was explained away with a few throwaway lines.

Law made crossover appearances on episodes of Early Edition and Walker, Texas Ranger, the former preceding it and the latter following it in its Saturday time slot. Chuck Norris's Walker, Texas Ranger character, Cordell Walker, also made an appearance as part of the two-part Martial Law/Walker, Texas Ranger crossover.

=== Cancellation ===
After season two, CBS offered Sammo Hung a third season, but Hung said he would not do it without a final say on scripts, claiming that the new screenwriter CBS assigned to the show for season two made him nothing but a fighting machine. An article in the magazine Black Belt mentions that due to the $2 million cost of production per episode, the show was cancelled.

== Broadcast ==
In the UK and Ireland, the show used to air on Five from 1998 to 2005, then on ITV4 showing replays of the episodes from 2005 to 2007 and then on Bravo from 2009 to 2011. In France, Martial Law (Le Flic de Shanghaï) can be seen on M6 and W9. It was previously broadcast on Britain's Channel 5 at 8 pm on Sundays, scoring high ratings in 98, Australia's Seven Network in 1998, on ATV in Hung's native Hong Kong, on TV4 in Sweden and on TV3, Sky1, and Channel 4 in New Zealand. It was previously broadcast on Dubai-based MBC 2, but can now be seen on MBC Action. In Germany, the series was broadcast on VOX. In Brazil, the series can be seen on Rede Bandeirantes since November 2007 as Um Policial da Pesada ("A heavy-set cop"). In Colombia, the series was broadcast on RCN Television. In Hungary, the series aired on RTL Klub as A harc törvénye ("The rules of engagement").

Also in Indonesia, from 2000 to 2002 it was aired on Indosiar every Monday night.

== Home media ==
=== VCD ===
Release date	Release title	Country	Publisher	Format	Language	Subtitles	Notes	Ref
1 January 2000	Martial Law: Shanghai Express	Hong Kong	Deltamac (HK)	NTSC	English	Traditional Chinese	1 VCD	
15 April 2005	Martial Law: Diamond Fever	Hong Kong	Deltamac (HK)	NTSC	English	Traditional Chinese	1 VCD	
15 April 2005	Martial Law: Dead Ringers	Hong Kong	Deltamac (HK)	NTSC	English	Traditional Chinese	1 VCD	
15 April 2005	Martial Law: Funny Money	Hong Kong	Deltamac (HK)	NTSC	English	Traditional Chinese	1 VCD	
15 April 2005	Martial Law: Extreme Mesures	Hong Kong	Deltamac (HK)	NTSC	English	Traditional Chinese	1 VCD	
15 April 2005	Martial Law: Trackdown	Hong Kong	Deltamac (HK)	NTSC	English	Traditional Chinese	1 VCD	
15 April 2005	Martial Law: Take Out	Hong Kong	Deltamac (HK)	NTSC	English	Traditional Chinese	1 VCD	
15 April 2005	Martial Law: Lock-Up	Hong Kong	Deltamac (HK)	NTSC	English	Traditional Chinese	1 VCD	
15 April 2005	Martial Law: Substitutes	Hong Kong	Deltamac (HK)	NTSC	English	Traditional Chinese	1 VCD	
15 April 2005	Martial Law: Trifecta	Hong Kong	Deltamac (HK)	NTSC	English	Traditional Chinese	1 VCD	
15 April 2005	Martial Law Collection	Hong Kong	Deltamac (HK)	NTSC	English	Traditional Chinese	10 VCD's	

=== DVD ===
For many years, fans had petitioned for the show to be released onto DVD.

On May 4, 2015, it was announced that Visual Entertainment had acquired the rights to the series and will be releasing the complete series on DVD for the first time in the early spring of 2016 in the United States and Canada. According to Visual Entertainment the Boxset was released on August 30, 2016 and also includes the crossover episodes from the shows Early Edition and Walker, Texas Ranger.

Release date	Release title	Discs	Region	Notes	Ref
30 August 2016	Martial Law - The Complete Collection	10	1 NTSC	Includes the crossover episodes from the shows Early Edition and Walker, Texas Ranger.	

== Ratings ==
Season		U.S. ratings	Network	Rank
1	1998–1999	11.00 million	CBS	#57
2	1999–2000	10.08 million	CBS	#59

The show aired on Saturday nights throughout its run.
