= Bill McSweeney =

Bill McSweeney is a senior research fellow in international peace studies at the Trinity College Dublin, Ireland. Within academia he is considered the leading critic of the Copenhagen School of security studies.

== Select publications ==
- McSweeney, B. (1999) Security, Identity and Interests: A Sociology of International Relations, Cambridge: Cambridge University Press
