= Tango (Sonia & Disappear Fear album) =

Studio album by Sonia & Disappear Fear
- Released: 2 October 2007
- Genres: World, Latin American
- Length: 40:51
- Languages: Spanish, Hebrew, Arabic, English
- Label: Disappear Records
- Producers: John Grant; Sonia Rutstein

Sonia & Disappear Fear chronology
DF 05 Live (2005)	Tango (2007)	Splash (2009)

Tango is the first studio album by the American folk band Sonia & Disappear Fear, released on October 2, 2007 by Sonia's own Disappear Records label. The majority of the tracks are sung in Spanish, with a few sung in Hebrew, Arabic and English. Five of the tracks are translated versions of older songs: "Fallin'", "Be the One", "Sexual Telepathy", "Because We're Here" and "Millions of Rope".

== Track listing ==
All tracks are written by Sonia Rutstein.

No.	Title	Length
1.	"Telepatia Sexual" ("Sexual Telepathy")	3:23
2.	"La Tormenta Santa" ("The Holy Storm")	2:50
3.	"Mica Moca" ("Who Is Greater")	3:15
4.	"Porque Estamos Aqui" ("Because We're Here")	4:37
5.	"Shorashim" ("Roots")	3:21
6.	"Millones de Cuerdas" ("Millions of Rope")	2:54
7.	"Un Medio de un Pulso" ("In the Middle of the Beat")	2:16
8.	"Metzotzim Anaquim" ("Big Giant Planes")	2:55
9.	"Cayendo" ("Fallin'")	3:29
10.	"Te Quiero" ("I Want You")	3:48
11.	"Se Tu Aquella" ("Be the One")	4:31
12.	"Tango (Li Annaka)"	3:19
13.	"Big Giant Planes"	2:53
Total length:		40:51

== Personnel ==
Sonia & Disappear Fear

- Sonia Rutstein (SONiA) – lead vocals, guitar
- Laura Cerulli – percussionist, drums, backing vocals
- John Grant – electric guitar, acoustic guitar, bass, programming
- Christopher Sellman – bass

=== Additional personnel ===
- Rabbi Elizabeth Bolton – vocals
- Helen Hausmann – violin
- Jared Denhard – tin whistle, flute
- Brian Simms – piano
