= Toby Bluth =

American painter

- Born: Frederick L. Bluth; July 11, 1940; Texas, United States
- Died: October 31, 2013 (aged 73); Los Angeles, California, U.S.
- Occupations: Painter, animator, background artist, production designer, theater director, film director
- Years active: 1977–2013
- Relatives: Don Bluth (brother)

Frederick L. "Toby" Bluth (July 11, 1940 – October 31, 2013) was an American illustrator who worked on many Disney films and others as animator, background artist, and production designer. He had a long career writing and illustrating children's books, as well as performing and directing, nearly one hundred musicals, both on Broadway and off. His artwork is prominently displayed at most of the Disney theme parks around the world. He was the younger brother of Don Bluth, whom he collaborated with on both theater and animation.

== Style ==
Gustaf Tenggren was a big inspiration throughout Bluth's career. When asked how he approached each of his watercolor masterpieces, Toby described his intent as

Creating the moment that you think you saw ... How one remembers a film is often different from the actual film itself.

In addition to his work on Disney films, Bluth created a large portfolio of erotic gay art, as well as commissioned illustrations for gay businesses and publications like The Advocate.

== Death ==
He died on October 31, 2013, in Los Angeles, California, following a stroke. He was survived by his long-time partner, Jack Griffith, and his older brother Don Bluth.

== Filmography ==
Film	Year	Credit
Mickey, Donald, Goofy: The Three Musketeers	2004	Art director
The Tigger Movie	2000	Additional background artist / Stylist
Babes in Toyland	1997	Director / Lyricist / Background designer / Character designer
The Story of Santa Claus	1996	Director
Alvin and the Chipmunks	1983	Character designer / Production designer
The Smurfs	1981	Background stylist
A Chipmunk Christmas	1981	Production designer
Banjo the Woodpile Cat	1979	Writer (uncredited)

== Books written and illustrated by Toby Bluth ==
- Bluth, Toby; Barnhart, Philo (1995). Disney's Cinderella. Dreams come true. Mouse Works. ISBN 978-1-57082-242-1. OCLC 32815908 – via Internet Archive.
- Bluth, Toby (1994). Disney's Dopey Loses the Diamonds. Mouse Works. ISBN 978-1-57082-150-9. OCLC 35086264.
- Bluth, Toby (1994). Disney's Snow White's Escape. Mouse Works. ISBN 978-1-57082-153-0. OCLC 32320556.
- Bluth, Toby; Bluth, Brad (1985). Tenderfoot. Chicago: Childrens Press. ISBN 978-0-516-09166-2. OCLC 12998647.
- Bluth, Brad; Bluth, Toby (1983). Siegfried's Silent Night. Milwaukee, Wis.: Ideals Pub. Co. ISBN 978-0-8249-8059-7. OCLC 10188627.
