= Mathew Valencia =

American actor

- Born: December 12, 1983 (age 42); Fontana, California, U.S.
- Occupation: Actor
- Years active: 1994–2002
- Relatives: Joseph Ashton (brother)

Mathew Valencia (born December 12, 1983) is an American former actor.

== Career ==
Valencia is best known as the voice of Tim Drake in media set in the DC Animated Universe, including The New Batman Adventures (1997-1999), Superman: The Animated Series (1998), and Batman Beyond: Return of the Joker (2000).

== Filmography ==
=== Film ===
Year	Title	Role	Notes
1994	Deep Down	Boy	
1995	Tom and Huck	Taverner	
1996	Lawnmower Man 2: Beyond Cyberspace	Homeless Kid	
2000	Batman Beyond: Return of the Joker	Tim Drake / Robin	Voice, direct-to-video

=== Television ===
Year	Title	Role	Notes
1994	Midnight Runaround	Kid #1	Television film
1996	The Bold and the Beautiful	Patrick	1 episode
1997–1998	The New Batman Adventures	Tim Drake / Robin (voice)	12 episodes
1998	Superman: The Animated Series	Tim Drake / Robin (voice)	Episode: "Knight Time"
2002	As Told by Ginger	Joaquin Cortez (voice)	Episode: "Love with a Proper Transfer Student"
