= 25th Young Artist Awards =

2004 US media awards ceremony

- Official program
- Awarded for: Achievement in 2003 in film and television
- Date: May 8, 2004
- Site: Sportsmen's Lodge; Studio City, Los Angeles, California
- Hosted by: Miranda Cosgrove

The 25th Young Artist Awards ceremony, presented by the Young Artist Association, honored excellence of young performers under the age of 21 in the fields of film and television for the year 2003, and took place on May 8, 2004 at the Sportsmen's Lodge in Studio City, Los Angeles, California.

Established in 1978 by long-standing Hollywood Foreign Press Association member, Maureen Dragone, the Young Artist Association was the first organization to establish an awards ceremony specifically set to recognize and award the contributions of performers under the age of 21 in the fields of film, television, theater and music.

== Categories ==
★ Bold indicates the winner in each category.

== Best Performance in a Feature Film ==
=== Best Performance in a Feature Film - Leading Young Actor ===
★ Jeremy Sumpter - Peter Pan - Universal Pictures

- Liam Aiken - Good Boy! - Jim Henson Productions
- David Henrie - Arizona Summer - Westpark Productions
- Shia LaBeouf - Holes - Walt Disney Pictures
- Frankie Muniz - Agent Cody Banks - MGM
- Haley Joel Osment - Secondhand Lions - New Line Cinema

=== Best Performance in a Feature Film - Leading Young Actress ===
★ Jenna Boyd - The Missing - Revolution Studios

- Dakota Fanning - The Cat in the Hat - Universal Pictures
- Rachel Hurd-Wood - Peter Pan - Universal Pictures
- Lindsay Lohan - Freaky Friday - Walt Disney Pictures
- Evan Rachel Wood - Thirteen - Fox Searchlight Pictures

=== Best Performance in a Feature Film - Supporting Young Actor ===
★ Scott Terra - Dickie Roberts: Former Child Star - Paramount Pictures

- Marc John Jefferies - The Haunted Mansion - Walt Disney Pictures
- Aaron Taylor-Johnson - Shanghai Knights - Buena Vista Pictures
- Harry Newell - Peter Pan - Universal Pictures
- Noah Poletiek - Holes - Walt Disney Pictures
- Thomas Sangster - Love Actually - Universal Pictures
- Khleo Thomas - Holes - Walt Disney Pictures

=== Best Performance in a Feature Film - Supporting Young Actress ===
★ Aree Davis - The Haunted Mansion - Walt Disney Pictures

- Jenna Boyd - Dickie Roberts: Former Child Star - Paramount Pictures
- Carsen Gray - Peter Pan - Universal Pictures
- Olivia Marsico - Hotel Lobby - Triskelion, Inc.
- Melissa Mitchell - Anger Management - Revolution Studios
- Kristen Stewart - Cold Creek Manor - Touchstone Pictures

=== Best Performance in a Feature Film - Young Actor Age Ten or Younger ===
★ Forrest Landis - Cheaper by the Dozen - 20th Century Fox

- Jimmy Bennett - Daddy Day Care - Revolution Studios
- Lorenzo James Henrie - Arizona Summer - Westpark Productions
- Ryan Malgarini - Freaky Friday - Buena Vista Pictures
- Mitchel Musso and Marc Musso - Secondhand Lions - New Line Cinema

=== Best Performance in a Feature Film - Young Actress Age Ten or Younger ===
★ Emma Bolger - In America - Hell's Kitchen Films

- Jillian Clare - Quigley - Quigley Productions
- Hailey Anne Nelson - Big Fish - Columbia Pictures
- Jennifer Stone - Secondhand Lions - New Line Cinema
- Alyson Stoner - Cheaper by the Dozen - 20th Century Fox

=== Best Performance in a Feature Film - Young Ensemble Cast ===
★ Cheaper by the Dozen

Hilary Duff, Brent Kinsman, Shane Kinsman, Forrest Landis, Steven Anthony Lawrence, Liliana Mumy, Kevin Schmidt, Jacob Smith, Alyson Stoner, Blake Woodruff and Morgan York

- Daddy Day Care

Felix Archille, Shane Baumel, Jimmy Bennett, Max Burkholder, Connor Carmody, Elle Fanning, Cesar Flores, Khamani Griffin, Bridgette Ho, Hailey Noelle Johnson, Kennedy McCullogh, Alyssa Shafer and Arthur Young

- Spy Kids 3-D: Game Over

Bobby Edner, Courtney Jines, Matt O'Leary, Emily Osment, Ryan Pinkston, Daryl Sabara, Alexa Vega and Robert Vito

- School of Rock

Aleisha Allen, Rebecca Brown, Kevin Alexander Clark, Miranda Cosgrove, Joey Gaydos, Caitlin Hale, Maryam Hassan and Robert Tsai

== Best Performance in a Short Film ==
=== Best Performance in a Short Film ===
★ Caitlin E. J. Meyer - A Pioneer Miracle - Independent

- Devon Alan - It's Better to Be Wanted for Murder Than Not to Be Wanted at All - Fox Searchlab
- Houston McCrillis - Stop That Cycle - Independent
- Darian Weiss - Little Ricky - Independent

== Best Performance in a TV Movie, Miniseries or Special ==
=== Best Performance in a TV Movie, Miniseries or Special - Leading Young Actor ===
★ (tie) Logan Lerman - A Painted House - Hallmark Hall of Fame
★ (tie) Calum Worthy - National Lampoon's Thanksgiving Family Reunion - FOX

- Josh Hutcherson - Wilder Days - TNT
- Eddy Martin - The Maldonado Miracle - Showtime
- Jake D. Smith - Air Bud: Spikes Back - Ruff Productions
- Dylan Wagner - The Last Cowboy - Hallmark Channel

=== Best Performance in a TV Movie, Miniseries or Special - Leading Young Actress ===
★ Katie Boland - Salem Witch Trials - CBS

- Amber Marshall - The Elizabeth Smart Story - CBS
- Brittany Robertson - The Ghost Club - Artist View Entertainment
- Cassie Steele - Full Court Miracle - Disney
- Sofia Vassilieva - Eloise at Christmastime - ABC

=== Best Performance in a TV Movie, Miniseries or Special - Supporting Young Actor ===
★ Jamie Johnston - More Than Meets the Eye: The Joan Brock Story - Lifetime

- Jacob Kraemer - The Elizabeth Smart Story - CBS
- Steven Anthony Lawrence - The Even Stevens Movie - Disney Channel
- Cameron Monaghan - The Music Man - ABC
- David Sazant - Full Court Miracle - Disney

=== Best Performance in a TV Movie, Miniseries or Special - Supporting Young Actress ===
★ Emmy Clarke - My House in Umbria - HBO

- Ashley Edner - Monster Makers - Hallmark Channel
- Margo Harshman - The Even Stevens Movie - Disney Channel
- Hannah Lochner - The Elizabeth Smart Story - CBS

== Best Performance in a TV Series ==
=== Best Performance in a TV Series (Comedy or Drama) - Leading Young Actor ===
★ Martin Spanjers - 8 Simple Rules for Dating My Teenage Daughter - ABC

- Jake Epstein - Degrassi: The Next Generation - CTV
- David Henrie - The Pitts - FOX
- Kyle Massey - That's So Raven - Disney Channel
- Charlie Stewart - Life with Bonnie - ABC
- Jeremy Suarez - The Bernie Mac Show - FOX

=== Best Performance in a TV Series (Comedy or Drama) - Leading Young Actress ===
★ Masiela Lusha - The George Lopez Show - ABC

- Amanda Bynes - What I Like About You - WB
- Christel Khalil - The Young and the Restless - ABC
- Scarlett Pomers - Reba - WB
- Shadia Simmons - Strange Days at Blake Holsey High - NBC/CTV
- Raven-Symoné - That's So Raven - Disney Channel

=== Best Performance in a TV Series (Comedy or Drama) - Supporting Young Actor ===
★ Michael Welch - Joan of Arcadia - CBS

- Griffin Frazen - Grounded for Life - WB
- Christopher Gerse - Days of Our Lives - NBC
- Aaron Meeks - Soul Food - Showtime
- Tyler Posey - Doc - PAX
- Jake Thomas - Lizzie McGuire - Disney Channel

=== Best Performance in a TV Series (Comedy or Drama) - Supporting Young Actress ===
★ Mackenzie Rosman - 7th Heaven - WB

- Margo Harshman - Even Stevens - Disney Channel
- Vanessa Lengies - American Dreams - NBC
- Brittany Snow - American Dreams - NBC
- Emily VanCamp - Everwood - WB
- Karle Warren - Judging Amy - CBS

=== Best Performance in a TV Series (Comedy or Drama) - Young Actor Age Ten or Younger ===
★ Angus T. Jones - Two and a Half Men - CBS

- Dylan Cash - General Hospital - ABC
- Ethan Dampf - American Dreams - NBC
- Noah Gray-Cabey - My Wife and Kids - ABC
- Austin Majors - NYPD Blue - ABC
- Bobby Preston - Dragnet - ABC
- Bobb'e J. Thompson - The Tracy Morgan Show - NBC

=== Best Performance in a TV Series (Comedy or Drama) - Young Actress Age Ten or Younger ===
★ Dee Dee Davis - The Bernie Mac Show - FOX

- Taylor Atelian - According to Jim - ABC
- Billi Bruno - According to Jim - ABC
- Vivian Cardone - Everwood - WB
- Macey Cruthird - Hope & Faith - ABC
- Sarah Ramos - American Dreams - NBC
- Alex Steele - Degrassi: The Next Generation - CTV

=== Best Performance in a TV Series - Guest Starring Young Actor ===
★ Thomas Dekker - Boston Public - FOX

- Marc Donato - Doc - PAX
- Alex Edwards - E.R. - NBC
- Miko Hughes - Boston Public - FOX
- Joseph Marresse - Doc - PAX
- Miles Marsico - Judging Amy - CBS

=== Best Performance in a TV Series - Guest Starring Young Actress ===
★ Danielle Panabaker - The Guardian - CBS

- Aria Noelle Curzon - Without a Trace - CBS
- Hallie Kate Eisenberg - Presidio Med - CBS
- Jodelle Ferland - Smallville - WB
- Sara Paxton - CSI: Miami - CBS
- Aria Wallace - That '70s Show - FOX

=== Best Performance in a TV Series - Recurring Young Actor ===
★ Oliver Davis - E.R. - NBC

- Patrick Allen Dorn - The Bold and the Beautiful - CBS
- David Rendall - Radio Free Roscoe - CTV
- Evan Saucedo - I'm With Her - ABC
- Darian Weiss - Days of Our Lives - NBC
- Crawford Wilson - Judging Amy - CBS

=== Best Performance in a TV Series - Recurring Young Actress ===
★ Jillian Clare - Days of Our Lives - NBC

- Kaitlin Cullum - 8 Simple Rules for Dating My Teenage Daughter - ABC
- Hallee Hirsh - JAG - CBS
- Erin Sanders - Carnivàle - HBO
- Scout Taylor-Compton - Gilmore Girls - WB
- Brittney Wilson - Romeo - Nickelodeon

=== Most Popular Mom & Dad in a Television Series ===
★ Julie Kavner & Dan Castellaneta - The Simpsons - FOX

- Gail O'Grady & Tom Verica - American Dreams - NBC
- Jane Kaczmarek & Bryan Cranston - Malcolm in the Middle - FOX
- Jami Gertz & Mark Addy - Still Standing - CBS
- Constance Marie & George Lopez - The George Lopez Show - ABC
- Jean Louisa Kelly & Anthony Clark - Yes, Dear - CBS

=== Best Young Adult Performer in a Teenage Role ===
★ Josh Keaton - The Even Stevens Movie - Disney

- Talia Schlanger - Strange Days at Blake Holsey High - NBC/CTV
- Kaley Cuoco - 8 Simple Rules for Dating My Teenage Daughter - ABC
- Patrick Flueger - Twelve Mile Road - CBS
- Christy Carlson Romano - The Even Stevens Movie - Disney
- Gregory Smith - Everwood - WB
- Amber Tamblyn - Joan of Arcadia - CBS

== Best Performance in a Voice-Over Role ==
=== Best Performance in a Voice-Over Role - Young Actor ===
★ Alexander Gould - Finding Nemo - Walt Disney/Pixar

- Harrison Chad - Dora the Explorer - Nickelodeon
- Eric Grucza - The Young Black Stallion - Walt Disney Pictures
- Haley Joel Osment - The Jungle Book 2 - Walt Disney Pictures
- Jeremy Suarez - Brother Bear - Walt Disney Pictures

=== Best Performance in a Voice-Over Role - Young Actress ===
★ Erica Beck - Finding Nemo - Walt Disney/Pixar

- Tajja Isen - The Berenstain Bears - PBS/CTV
- Masiela Lusha - Clifford's Puppy Days - PBS

== Best Performance in a Commercial ==
=== Best Performance in a Commercial ===
★ Mackenzie Hannigan - Smart & Final

- Jake Cherry - Vlasic Pickles
- Nolan Johnson - Toaster Strudel
- Kaitlyn Maggio - Hallmark Cards
- Frankie Ryan Manriquez - Maytag
- Kay Panabaker - Youth Anti-Smoking PSA

== Best Family Entertainment ==
=== Best Family Television Movie or Special ===
★ The Maldonado Miracle - Showtime

- The Last Cowboy - Hallmark Channel
- My House in Umbria - HBO
- A Painted House - Hallmark Hall of Fame
- Wilder Days - TNT

=== Best Family Television Series (Comedy or Drama) ===
★ Degrassi: The Next Generation - CTV

- American Dreams - NBC
- The Bernie Mac Show - FOX
- Joan of Arcadia - CBS
- Life with Bonnie - ABC
- The Simpsons - FOX
- Two and a Half Men - CBS

=== Best International Feature Film ===
★ Whale Rider - New Zealand

- Blizzard - Canada
- I'm Not Scared - Italy
- Osama - Afghanistan
- Valentín - Argentina

=== Best Family Feature Film - Animation ===
★ Finding Nemo - Walt Disney/Pixar

- Brother Bear - Walt Disney Pictures
- The Triplets of Belleville (Les Triplettes de Belleville) - Sony Pictures Classics

=== Best Family Feature Film - Comedy or Musical ===
★ School of Rock - Paramount Pictures

- Agent Cody Banks - MGM
- Big Fish - Columbia/Sony Pictures
- Good Boy! - MGM/Jim Henson Prods.
- A Mighty Wind - WB/Castle Rock Ent.
- Pirates of the Caribbean: The Curse of the Black Pearl - Walt Disney Pictures

=== Best Family Feature Film - Drama ===
★ (tie) The Lord of the Rings: The Return of the King - New Line Cinema
★ (tie) Peter Pan - Universal/Columbia/Revolution

- Holes - Walt Disney Pictures
- In America - Hell's Kitchen Films
- Master and Commander: The Far Side of the World - 20th Century Fox/Miramax/Universal
- Seabiscuit - Universal/DreamWorks

== Special awards ==
=== Best International Performance by a Young Actor ===
★ Max Pirkis - Master and Commander: The Far Side of the World (England)

=== Best International Performance by a Young Actress ===
★ Keisha Castle-Hughes - Whale Rider (New Zealand)

=== Outstanding Young Rock Musician ===
★ Nick Sterling - Nick Sterling Band (Arizona)

=== Best Family Foreign Film ===
★ Shantytown Blues (Russia)

=== Michael Landon Award ===
==== Contribution to Youth ====
★ Casey Morris - Guitars for Life

=== Jackie Coogan Award ===
==== Contribution to Youth ====
★ Peter Jackson - Lord of the Rings

=== Young Artist Awards Scholarship Recipient ===
★ Jose Francisco Romas Phifer

=== Social Relations of Knowledge Institute Award ===
★ Bill Nye the Science Guy - PBS
