= List of Even Stevens episodes =

The following is a list of episodes for the Disney Channel Original Series, Even Stevens. The series ran from June 17, 2000, to June 2, 2003 with 65 episodes produced spanning 3 seasons.

== Series overview ==
Season	Episodes	Originally released	
Season	Episodes	First released	Last released
1	21	June 17, 2000	February 23, 2001
2	22	June 15, 2001	February 15, 2002
3	22	February 22, 2002	June 2, 2003
TV film		June 13, 2003	

== Episodes ==
=== Season 1 (2000–01) ===
No. overall	No. in season	Title	Directed by	Written by	Original release date	Prod. code
1	1	"Swap.com"	Paul Hoen	Ehrich Van Lowe	June 17, 2000	102
Louis trades a date with Ren to Ernie Morton for a trading card. Meanwhile, Ren needs volunteer time to be the #1 student. Taking advantage of this, Louis tells Ren that Ernie is part of an adopt-a-friend program to get her to spend time with him.
2	2	"Stevens Genes"	Sean McNamara	Ehrich Van Lowe	June 24, 2000	101
Louis gets interested in making a successful name for himself along with the others in his family. He is convinced that he can run as fast as his athletic brother Donnie, because Larry tricks Coach Tugnut that Louis is fast enough to fill the available spot, but Ren discovers that this is a plot by Larry to embarrass the Stevens family.
3	3	"Take My Sister... Please"	Paul Hoen	Lore Kimbrough	July 1, 2000	103
Louis dreams of entering the school talent show. However, with no more slots available, he tries to convince Ren to share her slot with him.
4	4	"What'll Idol Do?"	Allison Liddi	Terry Maloney Haley & Mindy Morgenstern	July 8, 2000	104
Ren is overjoyed that June Marie is going to be her "pre-high school mentor." She excitedly sings her praises to everyone in the family, but Louis is only interested in finding his missing tape of a favorite Saturday Night Live episode. He gets some surveillance equipment from Tom and begins spying on family members to find out who taped over his show. While doing this he finds out that June Marie is only using Ren in an effort to make a play for their brother Donnie. Louis tells Ren, but she is reluctant to believe him.
5	5	"All About Yvette"	Allison Liddi	Terry Maloney Haley & Mindy Morgenstern	July 15, 2000	106
Ren becomes jealous of her best friend Charlotte's former best friend Yvette.
6	6	"Louis in the Middle"	Jonathan Winfrey	Mark Fink	July 22, 2000	105
In the cafeteria one day Louis saves the school's sort-of celebrity Blake Thompson (who's made a couple of TV commercials) from choking. Blake is grateful and takes a liking to Louis, inviting him to join his "in" crowd. Louis takes to his new status right away, putting a strain on his old friendships with Twitty and Tawny. But as soon as Blake sees that Louis is gaining some popularity himself, he drops him like a hot potato. Meanwhile, Ren is being given a hard time in her job as school policy monitor by Larry Beale, who heckles her when she speaks at lunch and fills her suggestion box with mean-spirited suggestions. Ren feels like she's "lost her mojo" when it comes to handling Larry and is going to quit her policy monitor position, but she gets some encouragement from Louis-and unexpectedly, from Larry, too.
7	7	"Foodzilla"	Peter Baldwin	Marc Warren	August 26, 2000	107
Ren is starting a school news station. Louis, wanting his fifteen minutes in fame, gives an accusing interview of the cafeteria lady, giving her the nickname "Foodzilla".
8	8	"Family Picnic"	Mark Rosman	Matt Dearborn	September 2, 2000	108
Louis discovers how competitive his father is at a picnic competition, and he feels he needs to win at any costs.
9	9	"Scrub Day"	Neal Israel	Dennis Rinsler	September 23, 2000	109
The eighth graders prepare for "Scrub Day" to prank the seventh-grade class. However, Louis becomes most-wanted scrub when he stands up to them. Donnie has to do a history report on someone famous.
10	10	"Easy Way"	Sean McNamara	Tom Burkhard	September 30, 2000	110
Louis, not enthusiastic of doing actual volunteer work, agrees to sleep in a bed for 48 hours to earn money for charity, not knowing what he might miss.
11	11	"Secrets and Spies"	Peter Baldwin	Sarah Jane Cunningham & Suzie Villandry	October 7, 2000	111
Louis discovers a hidden side to Ren: performing karaoke at a sushi restaurant in costume as "Isis." He then tries to make her confess this secret.
12	12	"Deep Chocolate"	Savage Steve Holland	Jessica Simpson	November 3, 2000	112
Louis and Twitty compete against each other at a school chocolate-selling competition, which threatens their friendship.
13	13	"After Hours"	Steve Dubin	Matt Dearborn & Todd Elliasson	November 17, 2000	113
Louis unplugs Ren's alarm clock, which starts a chain reaction that lands her in detention at the worst possible time: the day she needs to set up the school's anniversary display.
14	14	"Battle of the Bands"	Savage Steve Holland	Marc Warren	November 24, 2000	115
Louis puts together a band to play at a party. To get the gig, he needs a lead singer. Ren wants to go to the party to ask out a new crush, so she auditions for Louis' band. The bandmates, who approve of Ren's singing, shun Louis when he becomes angry with Ren joining the band, provoking him to start another band.
15	15	"Heck of a Hanukkah"	Neal Israel	Dennis Rinsler	December 1, 2000	118
Louis thinks his family would be better off if he weren't born and if instead they had someone perfect like the rest of the family, so his great-great-great-great-grandmother shows him a world where this is so.
16	16	"Luscious Lou"	Mark Rosman	Tom Burkhard	December 15, 2000	116
Louis needs to join a sports team, so he gets put into wrestling by Coach Tugnut. However, he's forced into a "lose-lose" situation when his opponent turns out to be a girl. Meanwhile, Ren attempts to retaliate at Louis for his pranks.
17	17	"Get a Job"	Jonathan Winfrey	Sarah Jane Cunningham & Suzie Villandry	January 5, 2001	117
Louis wants a sludgie machine, but needs to make money quickly. To this end, he finds an unusual get-rich-quick scheme: a dog-sitting service.
18	18	"Movie Madness"	Peter Baldwin	Sarah Jane Cunningham & Suzie Villandry	January 26, 2001	119
Louis decides to make a movie but ends up putting the success of his film over the safety of and his concern for his friends.
19	19	"Strictly Ballroom"	Matt Dearborn	Matt Dearborn	February 2, 2001	120
When Tawny goes to Zach's party, Louis has to go as well, but he does not know how to dance, so he seeks to learn how. Meanwhile, Ren decides to talk to her crush, Bobby Deaver, at the same party.
20	20	"Almost Perfect"	Sean McNamara	Tom Burkhard & Matt Dearborn	February 9, 2001	121
Ren reflects on everyone's expectations that she be perfect when she gets a "C" in woodshop. Meanwhile, Louis gets assigned a janitor's closet as a temporary locker, which he decks out as his own retreat.
21	21	"A Weak First Week"	David Steinberg	Matt Dearborn	February 23, 2001	114
Louis and Ren are stuck on a carnival ride. To keep the repairwoman interested in fixing the ride, they recount their first days at Lawrence Junior High.

=== Season 2 (2001–02) ===
No. overall	No. in season	Title	Directed by	Written by	Original release date	Prod. code
22	1	"Starstruck"	Jonathan Winfrey	Marc Warren	June 15, 2001	213
Ruby becomes obsessed with BBMak when they come to Sacramento and are giving away a chance to meet them as a radio contest prize. Louis becomes superstitious when he finds a "lucky" penny.
23	2	"Shutterbugged"	Peter Baldwin	Marc Warren	June 22, 2001	202
After Principal Wexler refuses to let Ren retake her school picture, she decides to stand up to him with support from Eileen, who was a student activist in her youth. Louis's room turns into a disaster, and Donnie attempts to take him in.
24	3	"Duck Soup"	Sean McNamara	David Brookwell & Sean McNamara	June 29, 2001	203
Louis' desire to save a duck from becoming dinner may ruin Eileen's chance to get her bill supported by the lieutenant governor.
25	4	"Quest for Coolness"	Donna Pescow	Dennis Rinsler	July 6, 2001	201
To be cool, Louis and Twitty search for a pair of trendy sneakers, despite the fact that they're sold out everywhere in the city. Eventually, they confront a culprit seeking to take their money for the sneakers. Meanwhile, Ren must put together the school newspaper despite her staff being busy with Ruby's fashion show.
26	5	"Secret World of Girls"	Fred Savage	Tom Burkhard	July 20, 2001	214
Ren hosts a slumber party, but Louis plans to sell tickets to watch the party in order to buy a suit of armor. Louis and Twitty soon realize a younger boy has been spying on them. They catch him and demand to know what he wants, but he admits that he's new to town and only wants to make friends. When they are on the verge of turning him away, Louis takes kindly to the boy's nerve, and nicknames him "Beans", ultimately using him in his slumber party spying scheme. Note: The first appearance of Beans.
27	6	"Broadcast Blues"	KC Lynn De Stefano	Sarah Jane Cunningham & Suzie Villandry	July 27, 2001	215
Ren is participating in a student news competition run by her idol, reporter Cynthia Mills. Louis, wishing to meet his idol, Zippy Winds, devises a plot to guarantee Ren's victory. Meanwhile, Donnie attempts to shed his unintelligent image.
28	7	"Thin Ice"	Jonathan Winfrey	Sarah Jane Cunningham & Suzie Villandry	August 3, 2001	204
Ren plans to go skating with Bobby Deaver, even though her parents want her at dinner with old friends who have just come back to Sacramento. Meanwhile, Louis begins prank calling.
29	8	"Head Games"	Peter Baldwin	Tom Burkhard	August 24, 2001	205
Louis ruins Twitty's chances at being a school baseball star. Meanwhile, Ren tries against all odds to sit next to Bobby Deaver on the bus.
30	9	"Love and Basketball"	John Tracy	Edward C. Evans	August 31, 2001	206
Louis coaches Donnie's basketball team. Meanwhile, Ren attempts to get Bobby to kiss her.
31	10	"Devil Mountain"	Matt Dearborn	Matt Dearborn	September 7, 2001	207
Two things keep thwarting Ren's effort to be with Bobby Deaver: Steve chaperoning a bird-watching school field trip to Devil Mountain, and an amorous student named Mandy "Always Gets Her Man" Sanchez who wants to make Bobby her next conquest. Meanwhile, Louis and Twitty get in a fight with Tom when his pizza oven breaks down.
32	11	"Wild Child"	Paul Hoen	Dennis Rinsler	September 28, 2001	209
Louis goes berserk during one of his mother's campaign commercials when he's forced to wear a juvenile short pants suit. Meanwhile, Donnie teaches Nelson a "lethal" martial art.
33	12	"Easy Crier"	Marc Warren	Barbie Feldman	October 5, 2001	208
Louis takes advantage of his friendship with Lenny "the Lifter" Cranepool, a physically intimidating student, to protect himself from being bullied, only to find out that Lenny easily cries under pressure. Meanwhile, Ren and Nelson petition for the cancellation of dodgeball at gym.
34	13	"A Very Scary Story"	Sean McNamara	David Brookwell & Sean McNamara	October 19, 2001	222
Louis plans on pulling a big Halloween prank, at the same time as certain strange goings on, are occurring. Every time a student leaves a room, where they take a supposed "eye examination", they leave with dark pairs of sunglasses, follow all the school rules, and a sudden craving for milk. When Louis asks his friends to take off their glasses, it reveals that they have no eyes. Louis sneaks into the "examination room" where it turns out that Principal Wexler, and Coach Tugnut as his Igor assistant, are using a hypnotic ray to control the minds of the students, and make them obey school rules, at the same time taking away their eyes. Louis tries to warn his family, but everyone, except Ren, falls victim. Louis finally finds Ren, and tries to escape, with her, when it is revealed that it was Ren's plan all along. She gives Louis a bag, full of the victims' eyes, the same prank that Louis was going to play on her. She then uses a machine that transforms the appearance of all the hypnotized people, along with Wexler and Tugnut, into beings with her likeness. When she forces Louis into the machine, wearing his penguin costume, it turns him into a penguin/Louis/Ren hybrid. It is then revealed that this is all a story, that Louis is telling his neighbor, Beans. Beans then runs away, when Ren walks in, with cartons, of milk. When asked if anything thing is wrong, Louis denies it, then loudly drinks his milk, the same way all the hypnotized people in his story drank milk.
35	14	"Sadie Hawkins Day"	Gregory Hobson	Sarah Jane Cunningham & Suzie Villandry	November 2, 2001	212
A turnaround dance causes trouble for Ren and Louis as they attempt to get last-minute dates.
36	15	"Sibling Rivalry"	KC Lynn De Stefano	Story by : Marc Warren; Teleplay by : Sarah Jane Cunningham & Suzie Villandry	November 3, 2001 (ABC); November 16, 2001 (Disney Channel)	210
Ren and Louis show their animosity on a local reality game show. Meanwhile, Donnie asks Nelson to help him talk to his French-speaking date Sandrine (Danica McKellar). Note: This episode first aired on November 3, 2001 as a part of ABC's "One Saturday Morning" lineup, almost two weeks before its scheduled November 16 premiere on Disney Channel.
37	16	"Wombat Wuv"	Donna Pescow	Tom Burkhard	November 30, 2001	211
Ren becomes a cheerleader and Louis becomes the school mascot to get closer to the beautiful new cheerleading coach.
38	17	"Uncle Chuck"	Ken Ceizler	Dennis Rinsler	December 21, 2001	217
Uncle Chuck (Richard Kind) visits and gives Louis new ideas that get him into enormous trouble, while also butting heads with Steve. Meanwhile, Ren and Nelson's cooking class project turns out to be too big for them to handle while dealing with Ms. Lynch (Mindy Sterling), their very strict home economics teacher.
39	18	"The Thomas Gribalski Affair"	Paul Hoen	Scott Frazee & Brooke Kaiser	December 28, 2001	218
Louis grows jealous when feels that Tom is replacing his role in the Stevens family. Meanwhile, Ren must demonstrate bicycle safety in a school program despite never having learned to ride a bike.
40	19	"Ren-Gate"	Neal Israel	Matt Dearborn	January 4, 2002	219
Louis surprises everyone when he does a good job as a hall monitor. However, he ends up discovering a secret about Ren, and vows to blow the whistle on her.
41	20	"Tight End in Traction"	Philip Charles MacKenzie	Matt Dearborn	January 11, 2002	216
When Louis's prank for revenge on Donnie ends up severely injuring him, it may ruin Donnie's chance at a college scholarship.
42	21	"Influenza: The Musical"	Sean McNamara	Marc Warren	January 25, 2002	220
Ren contracts influenza but is unwilling to forfeit her perfect attendance record. Once at school, everyone, including herself, starts singing and dancing in musical numbers. Following Principal Wexler's "Morning Announcements", Louis gives his all to avoiding Coach Tugnut's physical endurance test ("I Always Find a Way"). Meanwhile, Ruby and Neslon are concerned that Ren is unprepared for a major school project ("What's the Matter with Ren?"). When the computers in the computer lab crash, both Ren and Louis panic, while Steve and Eileen find out that Ren isn't home ("Sixth Period"). At gym class, Louis rallies his fellow students to overpower Tugnut ("Master(s) of the Gym"). Finally, Ren sings about going to the Moon in 1969 ("We Went to the Moon (in 1969)") to compensate for her lack of a full report and ultimately gets an F, which Larry encourages the other students to celebrate ("Ren Got an F!"). She screams and suddenly wakes up in bed again, feeling better and realizing the events of the day were a dream. When the family sings about her missing her perfect attendance record ("There'll Be No Award (You Missed a Day of School)"), Ren screams and wakes up again, realizing this was a dream, too. She screams a third time when Louis sings about bringing her soup, leaving him confused. Note: This episode was reaired at Midnight on Wednesday, April 17, 2013 as part of Disney Replay celebrating Disney Channel's 30th anniversary.
43	22	"Gutter Queen"	Dennis Rinsler	Story by : Matt Dearborn; Teleplay by : Sarah Jane Cunningham & Suzie Villandry	February 15, 2002	221
Ren's mother, Eileen, signs herself and Ren up for a mother-daughter bowling tournament. Also, Louis hires a British butler named Chives (Daniel Faltus) for a week after winning a contest.

=== Season 3 (2002–03) ===
No. overall	No. in season	Title	Directed by	Written by	Original release date	Prod. code
44	1	"The Kiss"	Matt Dearborn	Matt Dearborn	February 22, 2002	304
Ren is heading the production of a historical play she penned, starring Tom and Tawny. Louis and Tawny accidentally kiss, they confess their longtime feelings for each other, and start a relationship. While things are going well for Louis and Tawny; multiple people tell Ren that her play is boring. Ren rewrites the play to include a kiss between Tom and Tawny, causing Louis to get jealous and sabotage the play, which humiliates Tawny in the process. Louis and Tawny end the relationship as friends, but, after stepping away, Louis turns back and kisses Tawny, leaving her bewildered.
45	2	"Where in the World Is Pookie Stevens?"	David Brookwell	Sarah Jane Cunningham & Suzie Villandry	March 1, 2002	303
Louis holds a garage sale to earn money for a drum set, unintentionally selling Ren's stuffed animal Mr. Pookie. Upon making enough money for the drum set, he finds the missing toy and is moved to buy it instead as original Mr. Pookies are no longer in production. His parents reward his generosity by buying him a drum set, which he plays poorly.
46	3	"My Best Friend's Girlfriend"	KC Lynn De Stefano	Marc Warren	March 22, 2002	306
Louis gets jealous when Twitty would rather hang out with his new girlfriend than him. Donnie becomes competitive when Ren beats him at a rock climbing contest.
47	4	"Your Toast"	Sean McNamara	Dennis Rinsler	April 19, 2002	301
Ren gets a job at the local food court, dealing with Mr. Squirelli (Jason Marsden), her very strict boss. She then gets Ruby accidentally fired, causing an overall rift at the establishment. Meanwhile, a celebrity drummer offers to teach Louis how to play drums but starts by giving him practice stage atmosphere experience. Absent: Nick Spano as Donnie Stevens
48	5	"Band on the Roof"	Gregory Hobson	Tom Burkhard	May 3, 2002	305
In a "rockumentary" filmed by Tom, the Twitty-Stevens Connection slowly dissolves when Ren objects to Louis' plan to perform on the school roof.
49	6	"Little Mr. Sacktown"	Neal Israel	Marc Warren	May 10, 2002	302
Louis signs up Beans for a beauty pageant but abandons him.
50	7	"Raiders of the Lost Sausage"	Fred Savage	Scott Frazee & Brooke Kaiser	May 31, 2002	307
Steve is growing tired of Louis's get-rich-quick schemes but then discovers that Louis already has plans to find buried treasure underneath the Stevens' house in a parody of the Indiana Jones franchise. Ren and Larry Beale are tied together for five days when their rivalry gets uncontrollable.
51	8	"Close Encounters of the Beans Kind"	KC Lynn De Stefano	Steve Slavkin	June 14, 2002	314
After watching a TV show, Louis and Twitty notice that Beans exhibits many traits that lead them to believe Beans may be an extraterrestrial.
52	9	"Short Story"	Peter Baldwin	Sarah Jane Cunningham & Suzie Villandry	June 21, 2002	308
After an incident at another junior high, several students temporarily transfer in. Among them are a short kid that Ren agrees to go to a dance with, and Loomis, a Louis look-alike who gets Louis into trouble.
53	10	"Hutch Boy"	Savage Steve Holland	Tom Burkhard	July 5, 2002	309
When Louis is bullied, Tom stands up for him by demonstrating his impressive martial arts skills, so Louis seeks help from Tom, who encourages the unteachable Louis to find his inner strength outside of martial arts. Meanwhile, through a hair bleaching accident, Ren's personality changes in accordance with her newly blonde hair.
54	11	"Hardly Famous"	Gregory Hobson	Sarah Jane Cunningham & Suzie Villandry	August 9, 2002	311
When a famous star comes to host auditions for the school SACCY, Ren and Eileen are starstruck. However, when Louis faces the possibility that Tawny may transfer to SACCY, he considers his feelings for her.
55	12	"The King Sloppy"	Richard Wafer	Tom Burkhard	August 16, 2002	313
Ren is assigned to guide a royal exchange student. Louis and Twitty hatch a plan to eat a King Sloppy, the world's biggest hamburger, with the lady Ren is guiding emerging victorious when she visits the same restaurant.
56	13	"Boy on a Rock"	Marc Warren	Marc Warren	August 30, 2002	315
When Twitty's ex shows interest in Louis, he has to decide whether or not to go out with her. Meanwhile, Steve volunteers at Lawrence and risks embarrassing Ren and Louis.
57	14	"Dirty Work"	Donna Pescow	Matt Dearborn	September 6, 2002	310
Ren becomes uncomfortable doing Principal Wexler's dirty work, and becomes Coach Tugnut's assistant. Meanwhile, Louis starts a lumberjack club, in which he and his friends indulge themselves in pancakes before a threat to dissolve the club motivates them to take on a real lumberjack project.
58	15	"The Big Splash"	Paul Germain	Matt Dearborn	September 9, 2002	320
Louis must decide whether to remain a class clown when Steve tells him that he can't go through life being a prankster. Ren goes too far in her attempts to win "Best Smile" in the yearbook.
59	16	"Beans on the Brain"	Dennis Rinsler	Dennis Rinsler	September 16, 2002	317
Louis ditches Beans for a date with Beans' cousin and he grows a guilty conscience. Donnie gives up football.
60	17	"Snow Job"	Jonathan Winfrey	Dennis Rinsler	September 23, 2002	312
Louis thinks he will fail his algebra exam, so he ask for help from Tawny, who dramatically improves her amateur math skills in one afternoon. Meanwhile, when Ren accidentally injures Lawrence's champion pole-vaulter, she must take her place and learn pole vaulting before the track meet. Later, a seemingly sarcastic remark from Artie Ryans about his becoming King of Norway turns out to be literally true, as Louis and Ren witness his coronation during a breaking news broadcast. Guest Star: Phyllis Diller
61	18	"Stevens Manor"	David Grace	Tom Burkhard & Matt Dearborn	October 28, 2002	316
With his parents gone for their anniversary, Louis turns the house into a bed and breakfast to earn money for a ski trip, hiring his friends as the staff. Ren and Ruby fight about Ruby's boyfriend at a sleepover. Absent: Nick Spano as Donnie Stevens
62	19	"Model Principal"	Grant Heslov	Danny Warren & Josh Lynn	November 29, 2002	319
Louis has a plan to get Principal Wexler to leave Lawrence Junior High: he gets him a job as a model. Unfortunately, his replacement, while initially friendly, misinterprets a message from Ren and grows mad with power, becoming more than Louis and the entire student body of Lawrence can handle.
63	20	"Surf's Up"	Paul Hoen	Sarah Jane Cunningham & Suzie Villandry	March 31, 2003	321
When Twitty goes on a surf trip with Zach, Louis gets jealous and comes with him to the beach. Meanwhile, at the same beach, Ren falls in love with Gil, a seafood restaurant manager's son whom she believes is a "merman".
64	21	"In Ren We Trust"	David Kendall	Marc Warren & Dennis Rinsler	May 19, 2003	318
When Louis and the gang find a suitcase full of money, they agree to let Ren hold it for safekeeping. However, the pressures of having to be the one to trust get to her with Ren spending the money on herself. Nevertheless, her purchase of expensive lizard-skin pants and the ensuing events turn out to be a product of her fears of the worst that could happen.
65	22	"Leavin' Stevens"	David Brookwell	David Brookwell & Sean McNamara	June 2, 2003	322
When it is reported that Eileen Stevens won a seat on Congress, the Stevens family prepares to move to Washington, D.C. Ren finds her best friends a new "Ren Stevens", Steve quits his job, and Louis records a tape that tells Tawny his true feelings for her. Tawny makes a tape as well. Plans change when the Stevens family finds out they are not leaving after all after a recount.

== Film ==
Title	Directed by	Written by	Original release date
The Even Stevens Movie	Sean McNamara	Marc Warren & Dennis Rinsler	June 13, 2003
The Stevens think that they've won an all-expenses-paid trip to an island located halfway around the world. When their guest house on the island is destroyed, their food stolen, and their bacon eaten, the Stevens family breaks apart in front of all their friends on live national television without ever realizing that the island itself is only a short distance away from Sacramento and that the whole vacation is part of a reality show stunt.
