= Disney Channel Hits: Take 1 =

Compilation album by Various artists
- Released: October 26, 2004
- Genre: Pop
- Length: 33:43
- Label: Walt Disney

Disney Channel Hits album chronology
Disney Channel Hits: Take 1 (2004)	Disney Channel Hits: Take 2 (2005)

Professional ratings
Review scores
Source	Rating
Allmusic	3.5/5 stars

Disney Channel Hits: Take 1 is a CD and DVD collection of songs and music videos from Disney Channel Original Series. Released on October 26, 2004, the CD includes songs from Lizzie McGuire, That's So Raven, Even Stevens, Kim Possible and The Proud Family, plus six never-before released tracks. The DVD includes five music videos of select songs from the CD. A second compilation focusing on songs from Disney Channel Original Movies was released the following year.

== Track listing ==
Disney Channel Hits: Take 1 tracklist
No.	Title	Writer(s)	Artist(s)	Length
1.	"Lizzie McGuire Theme Song" (Extended Supa Mix)	Elliot Lurie	Angie Jaree	2:33
2.	"I Can't Wait" ((from Lizzie McGuire))	Matthew Gerrard; Christopher Ward; Brooke McClymont	Hilary Duff	3:11
3.	"That's So Raven Theme Song"	John Coda	Raven featuring Anneliese van der Pol and Orlando Brown	0:49
4.	"Supernatural" (Crystal Ball Mix; from That's So Raven)	Gerrard; Michelle Lewis	Raven	2:48
5.	"Shine" (from That's So Raven)	Charlene Licera; Ray Cham	Raven	3:05
6.	"Say the Word" (from Kim Possible)	Danny Jacob; Janis Liebhart	Christy Carlson Romano (as Kim Possible)	2:49
7.	"It's Just You" (from Kim Possible)	Adam Gurvitz; Charlie Midnight	LMNT	2:36
8.	"The Naked Mole Rap" (from Kim Possible)	Adam Berry; Bob Schooley; Mark McCorkle	Will Friedle and Nancy Cartwright (as Ron Stoppable and Rufus)	3:27
9.	"The Proud Family Theme Song" (Full version)	Kurt Farquhar; Stephen Anderson	Solange and Destiny's Child	2:18
10.	"Enjoy Yourself" (from The Proud Family)	Kenny Gamble; Leon Huff	L.P.D.Z.	3:06
11.	"It's All About Me" (from The Proud Family)	Andre Harrell; Anderson	Kyla Pratt (as Penny Proud)	1:54
12.	"Even Stevens Theme Song"	Coda	Coda	0:43
13.	"Aloha, E Komo Mai" (Extended version; from Lilo & Stitch: The Series)	Jacob; Mark Hammond; Ali B. Omo	Jump5	2:24
14.	"Phil of the Future Theme Song"	John Adair; Steve Hampton	Loren Ellis and the Drew Davis Band	0:51
15.	"Dave the Barbarian Theme Song"	Shawn Patterson; Doug Langdale	Various Artists	1:01

=== Bonus music videos ===
1. "I Can't Wait" (from Lizzie McGuire) - Hilary Duff
2. "Enjoy Yourself" (from The Proud Family) - L.P.D.Z.
3. "That's So Raven Theme Song" - Raven
4. "Supernatural" (from That's So Raven) - Raven
5. "The Naked Mole Rap" (from Kim Possible) - Ron Stoppable and Rufus
