= Teacher's Pet (disambiguation) =

Teacher's Pet may refer to:

- Teacher's pet, a phenomenon

== Films ==
- Teacher's Pet (1930 film), a two-reel "Our Gang" comedy short
- Teacher's Pet (1958 film), a romantic comedy film
- Teacher's Pet (2004 film), an animated musical based on a 2000 TV series
- Teacher's Pet (2025 film), a thriller film

== Television ==
- Teacher's Pet (TV series), a 2000 animated series about a dog who lives like a human
- Teacher's Pet (anime), a hentai anime about a student who loves her professor

=== Episodes ===
- "Teacher's Pet" (Buffy the Vampire Slayer), 1997
- "Teacher's Pet" (The Fairly OddParents), 2010
- "Teacher's Pet" (The Following), 2014
- "Teacher's Pet" (Goosebumps), 1998
- "Teacher's Pet" (The Proud Family), 2001
- "Teacher's Pet" (That's So Raven), 2007
- "Teacher's Pet" (Stitch & Ai), 2017

== Music ==
- "Teacher's Pet" (song), a 1958 song from the film of the same name
- "Teacher's Pet", a song by The Boys
- "Teacher's Pet", a song by B5 on the album B5
- "Teacher's Pet", a song by Christy Carlson Romano on the album Greatest Disney TV & Film Hits
- "Teacher's Pet", a song by Extreme on their album Extreme
- "Teacher's Pet", a song by Melanie Martinez from her album K-12
- "Teacher's Pet", a song by Venom on the album Black Metal

== Literature ==
- Teacher's Pet (comics), a British strip appearing in the 1970s comic book Cor!!
- Sensei no Okiniiri!, a manga by Miki Aihara, commonly referred to in English as Teacher's Pet!
- "Teacher's Pet" (short story), a 1994 story in the Goosebumps series by R. L. Stine
- Teacher's Pet, a 1986 novel by Andrew Neiderman

== Other uses ==
- The Teacher's Pet, a podcast hosted by Australian journalist Hedley Thomas
