= Disney Channel Hits: Take 2 =

Compilation album by Various artists
- Released: April 26, 2005
- Genre: Pop
- Length: 54:28
- Label: Walt Disney

Disney Channel Hits album chronology
Disney Channel Hits: Take 1 (2004)	Disney Channel Hits: Take 2 (2005)

Professional ratings
Review scores
Source	Rating
Allmusic	2.5/5 stars

Disney Channel Hits: Take 2 is a CD and DVD collection of songs and music videos from Disney Channel Original Movies and the follow-up to Disney Channel Hits: Take 1 (2004). Released on April 24, 2005, the CD includes songs from The Cheetah Girls, Stuck in the Suburbs, Pixel Perfect, Zenon: Z3, Halloweentown High, Tiger Cruise and a bonus track by Christy Carlson Romano. The DVD includes four music videos of select songs from the CD.

== Track listing ==
Disney Channel Hits: Take 2 tracklist
No.	Title	Writer(s)	Artist(s)	Length
1.	"Good Life" (from Stuck in the Suburbs)	Kristian Ottestad	Jesse McCartney	3:31
2.	"Over It" (from Stuck in the Suburbs)	Adam Dodd; Adam Watts	Anneliese van der Pol	3:50
3.	"A Whatever Life" (from Stuck in the Suburbs)	Desmond Child; Brendan Lynch	Haylie Duff	3:31
4.	"Cinderella" (Remix; from The Cheetah Girls)	Kevin Savigar; Lindy Robbins	The Cheetah Girls	3:35
5.	"Cheetah Sisters" (from The Cheetah Girls)	Jamie Houston	The Cheetah Girls	3:07
6.	"Girl Power" (Remix; from The Cheetah Girls)	Ray Cham; Rwaana Barnes	The Cheetah Girls	2:54
7.	"My Hero Is You" (from Tiger Cruise)	Houston	Hayden Panettiere	3:52
8.	"Anyone But Me" (from Zenon: Z3)	Matthew Gerrard; Bridget Benenate	Christy Carlson Romano	3:23
9.	"Out of This World" (from Zenon: Z3)	Gerrard; Lisa Benenate	Cosmic Blush and Proto Zoa	3:40
10.	"Notice Me" (from Pixel Perfect)	Lyle Oliver; Mladen Borosak	Zetta Bytes	3:34
11.	"Perfectly" (from Pixel Perfect)	Keith Follesé; Adrienne Follesé; Jessica Harp	Huckapoo	3:39
12.	"When the Rain Falls" (from Pixel Perfect)	Houston	Zetta Bytes	4:01
13.	"Strange World" (from Halloweentown High)	Dodd; Watts	Jessie Payo	3:00
14.	"Good Life" (Remix; from Stuck in the Suburbs)	Ottestad	McCartney	3:15
15.	"Dive In" (Bonus track; from Greatest Disney TV & Film Hits)	Gerrard; Cindy Morgan; Rachael Lampa	Romano	3:14

While the majority of songs were previously released on their respective soundtracks, "My Hero Is You" and "Strange World" were exclusive prior to the UK-only release of The Very Best of Disney Channel (2007).

=== Bonus music videos ===
1. "Cinderella" - The Cheetah Girls
2. "Good Life" - Jesse McCartney
3. "Get Your Shine On" - Jesse McCartney
4. "Dive In" - Christy Carlson Romano
