= A. J. Trauth =

American actor and musician (born 1986)

- Born: Andrew James Trauth; September 14, 1986 (age 39); Chicago, Illinois, U.S.
- Occupations: Actor, singer
- Years active: 1999–present
- Member of: Mavin
- Spouse: Leah Pipes (m. 2014; div. 2019) Caitlin Carney (m. 2025)

Andrew James Trauth (born September 14, 1986) is an American actor and singer. Trauth is known for playing Alan Twitty on Even Stevens and Josh Mankey on Kim Possible, both programs which aired on Disney Channel. Furthermore, Trauth is a vocalist for the pop rock trio Mavin, which he formed with his two brothers in 2002. The trio performed the theme song to another Disney Channel property, American Dragon: Jake Long.

== Acting career ==
Trauth is known for playing Alan Twitty on Even Stevens and did a guest role in The Amanda Show opposite Amanda Bynes and Drake Bell. Later he worked with Bell and Brenda Song in an episode of R. L. Stine's show taken from the book series: The Nightmare Room in the episode "Dear Diary, I'm Dead".

On the TV show Kim Possible, Trauth voiced Josh Mankey, a one-time love interest of Kim (voiced by Christy Carlson Romano).

Trauth also made a guest appearance on Reba as Kyra's 17-year-old date Scott in the episode the "United Front". Trauth starred in the Disney Channel original movie You Wish! alongside Lalaine Vergara. He has also worked opposite Rebecca Romijn in Pepper Dennis as the title character's younger brother, Mitch. Trauth also appeared in an episode of House, playing an older brother in the clinic when his little brother gets treated by Dr. House.

In 2003, Trauth guest-starred on 7th Heaven, in the eighth season episode "Getting to Know You". In 2006, Trauth guest-starred on the CBS drama Numb3rs, and on the Fox drama Bones in 2009.

== Personal life ==
On February 5, 2014, Us Weekly announced that Trauth had become engaged to actress Leah Pipes, after almost three years of dating. They married on December 6, 2014, in Santa Barbara, California. Pipes filed for divorce in May 2019, citing "irreconcilable differences."

== Filmography ==
Film roles
Year	Title	Role	Notes
2005	Happy Endings	Bill	
2008	The Last Word	Greg	
2015	Welcome to Happiness	Penley	
2016	Moments of Clarity	Trevor	
2017	Camp Cool Kids	Garrett	

Television roles
Year	Title	Role	Notes
1999	Search for the Jewel of Polaris: Mysterious Museum	Ben	Television film
2000	The Amanda Show	Himself	1 episode
2000–03	Even Stevens	Alan Twitty	Main role
2002	The Nightmare Room	Shawn	1 episode
2002–04	Kim Possible	Josh Mankey	3 episodes
2003	7th Heaven	Jordan James	1 episode
2003	Phil at the Gate	N/A	Television film
2003	You Wish!	Alex Lansing	Television film
2003	The Even Stevens Movie	Alan Twitty	Television film
2003–04	Oliver Beene	Harver Dillman	3 episodes
2004	Fillmore!	Chet	1 episode
2004	Reba	Scott	2 episodes
2004	The Deerings	N/A	Television film
2005	House	Henry	2 episodes
2005	Ghost Whisperer	Tom	1 episode
2005	CSI: Crime Scene Investigation	Dexter	1 episode
2005	Numb3rs	Jake	1 episode
2006	Brandy & Mr. Whiskers	Marvin	1 episode
2006	Pepper Dennis	Mitch Dinkle	Recurring role, 5 episodes
2005	Mystery Woman: Game Time	Cameron	Television film
2006	Wild Hearts	Tim	Television film
2009	Bones	Pinworm	1 episode
2011	Rules of Engagement	Topher	1 episode
2012	Franklin & Bash	Tammi's Lawyer	1 episode
2012	Ro	Shane	4 episodes

Video game roles
Year	Title	Role
2014	Wolfenstein: The New Order	Probst Wyatt III
2017	Wolfenstein II: The New Colossus	Probst Wyatt III
