= Hears Premears, Vol. 1: Music from Disney Channel Original Movies =

Compilation album by Various artists
- Released: November 16, 1999
- Genre: Disco, pop, pop rock
- Length: 54:28
- Label: Hollywood

Professional ratings
Review scores
Source	Rating
Allmusic	3/5 stars

Hears Premears, Vol. 1: Music from Disney Channel Original Movies is a compilation album of various songs featured in Disney Channel Original Movies. Released on November 16, 1999 by Hollywood Records, at least one song from a Disney Channel film released at the time (between 1997–1999) is represented on the compilation, with the exception of Halloweentown. Despite the implications of the title, no direct follow-up volumes were released, until a very similar compilation, Disney Channel Hits: Take 2 (2005), was released over five years later.

== Track listing ==
1. "Sooner or Later" - Fastball (from Brink!)
2. "C'est la Vie" - B*Witched (from Smart House)
3. "Slam Dunk (Da Funk)" - 5ive (from Smart House)
4. "House Is Jumpin'" - Chane Andre (from Smart House)
5. "Life Jacket" - Simon Says (from Johnny Tsunami)
6. "Crystal 52" - Jeffries Fan Club (from Johnny Tsunami)
7. "So Down" - Jesse Camp (from Johnny Tsunami)
8. "The Prince You Charmed " - Youngstown (from Genius)
9. "Charlie Sees Claire" (score) - Peter Manning Robinson (from Genius)
10. "Supernova Girl" - Kristian Rex (from Zenon: Girl of the 21st Century)
11. "Zenon Main Title" (score) - Phil Marshall (from Zenon: Girl of the 21st Century)
12. "My Thirteenth Year" - Randy Crenshaw (from The Thirteenth Year)
13. "Off to the Mall" (score) - David Michael Frank (from You Lucky Dog)
14. "Get Down Tonight" - KC and the Sunshine Band (from Under Wraps)
15. "Boogie Wonderland" - Earth, Wind & Fire (from Don't Look Under the Bed)
16. "Monster Groove" - Mark Mothersbaugh & Bruce Berman (from Can of Worms)
17. "Telephone Number" - Rich Creamy Paint (from Horse Sense)
