= White's Lies =

- Written by: Ben Andron
- Characters: Joe White; Alan; Mrs. White; Michelle; Barbara

Premiere
- Date: Previews began April 12, 2010; Official opening May 6, 2010
- Place: New World Stages, New York City

White's Lies is a play written by Ben Andron.

The play began preview showings off-Broadway on April 12, 2010 and officially opened on May 6, 2010. Initial reviews were mixed; the New York Times called it a "crass, charmless vehicle" that "plays like an episode of How I Met Your Mother that would be killed in the writers’ room." while Entertainment Weekly gave it a C rating and said it was "the other kind of bad play — the one that's so ridiculous that you can't help giggling at the gaping, craterlike holes in the story and the cliché-spouting characters running around Manhattan in incredibly fabulous, incredibly impractical, incredibly expensive shoes."

The show closed on June 13, 2010 after 26 previews and 46 regular performances.

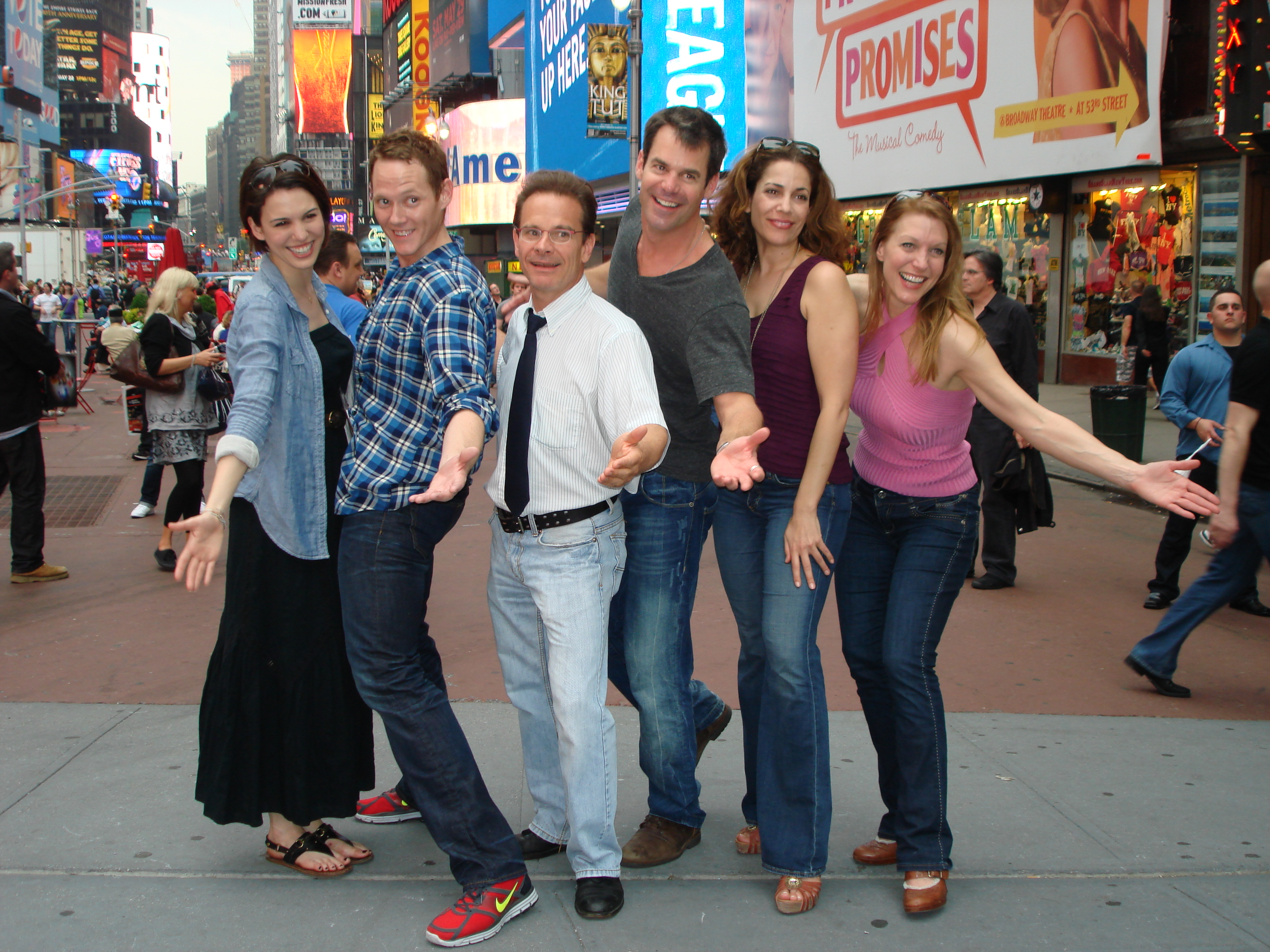
Cast members from the original production. From left: Christy Carlson Romano, Jimmy Ray Bennett, Peter Scolari, Tuc Watkins, Rena Strober and Andrea Grano

== Synopsis ==
Some guys are scared stiff at the prospect of settling down, getting married, having kids...and Joe White is no exception. He’s a divorce lawyer, representing one of his many ex-girlfriends, and above all else, he’s a bachelor who wouldn’t have it any other way. So when his mother desperately wants him to start a family, he’ll do the next best thing: make one up. What could go wrong?

== Original cast ==
- Tuc Watkins as Joe White
- Peter Scolari as Alan
- Betty Buckley as Mrs. White
- Christy Carlson Romano as Michelle
- Jimmy Ray Bennett as Men
- Andrea Grano as Barbara
- Rena Strober as Women
- Josh Davis understudy
