= Jimmy Ray Bennett =

American actor

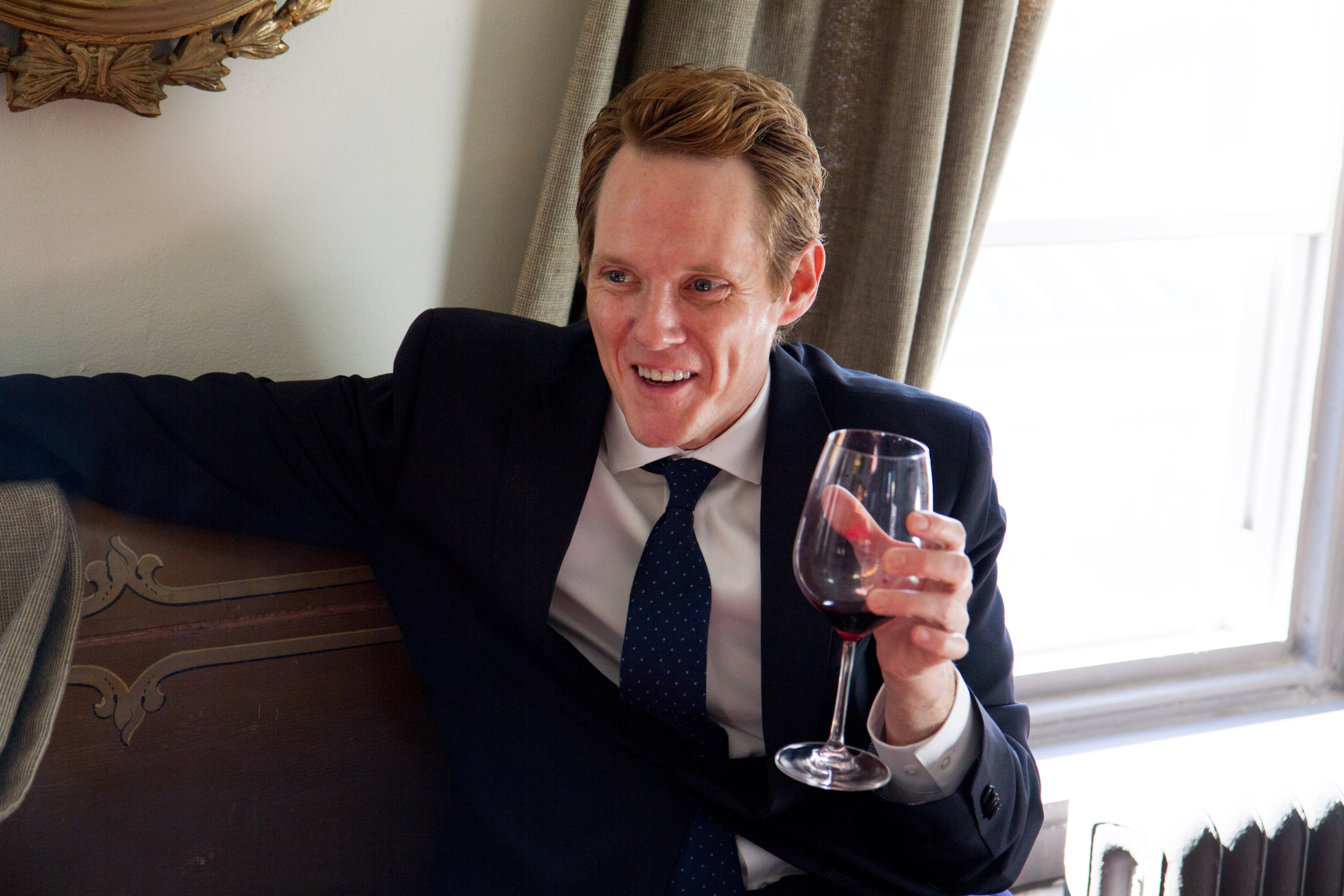
- Jimmy Ray Bennett being interviewed after the premiere of Hand of God
- Born: June 26; Tallahassee, Florida, U.S.
- Occupation: Actor

Jimmy Ray Bennett (born June 26) is an American actor. He is best known as the voice of Floyd Hebert in the 2013 video game Grand Theft Auto V and in television for the roles of Nathan Brooks in the Amazon Studios drama Hand of God and as the "White DL" in the Peabody Award-winning documentary DL Hughley: The Endangered List on Comedy Central.

== Early life ==
Bennett was born in Tallahassee, Florida. He earned his B.F.A in Theatre from Florida State University.

== Career ==
Bennett co-created the improvised musical The Nuclear Family with Stephen Guarino and John Gregorio. The show was considered a cult hit downtown and moved Off-Broadway in 2003 to the Zipper Theatre and subsequently to Barrow Street Theatre. The show was adapted for television the following year for the Sundance TV LAB. He has also improvised with Dad's garage in Atlanta and at The Groundlings in Los Angeles. In 2006, he won the World Domination Improv Tournament in Atlanta, along with The Nuclear Family.

In video games, he is the voice of Floyd Hebert in Grand Theft Auto V, of which he also provides the likeness and motion capture for the character. Released in 2013, GTA V is the largest grossing video game launch in history, having made over $800 million within the first 24 hours of release. He also voiced numerous characters in Red Dead Redemption. Both were produced by Rockstar Games.

Theatrically, he played Sohovik in Damn Yankees at City Center Encores Summer Stars. In 2008 he performed at The Kennedy Center in the cast of Broadway: Three Generations which opened the newly renovated Eisenhower Theater. Bennett was a member of the original productions of Illyria for Prospect Theatre Company and White's Lies at New World Stages with Betty Buckley. He was in the New York premier cast of Around The World In 80 Days in 2013, Off-Broadway. Bennett also participated in the 75th Sondheim! Birthday Concert with the NY Philharmonic at Lincoln Center. He can be heard on the Cast Recording for The York Theatre Company's SUNDOWN as Morgan Earp, as well as Vincent Youmans' THROUGH THE YEARS and Kay Swift's FINE AND DANDY. Both produced by PS Classics.

Bennett was part of the 2013 CBS diversity showcase in Los Angeles. He has been seen in Hot In Cleveland on TV Land. He was the neighbor in the Qu'osby Show parody on The Daily Show with Jon Stewart and in 2012, he was in the Peabody Award winning documentary DL Hugely: The Endangered List. He played tech billionaire Nathan Brooks on the Amazon Studios original drama Hand Of God.

Bennett resides in New York City.

== Filmography ==
=== Film ===
Year	Title	Role	Notes
2003	The Tool	Mayor	Short
2004	Last Men on Earth	Dan	Short
2004	Say You Do	Frederick	Short
2005	What Were You Thinking	-	Short
2007	A Little Silence	Detective Roberts	Short
2013	Snore (Downton Abbey)	-	Short
2018	The Last Breakfast Club	Vernon	
2022	Better Nate Than Ever	Fantasy Audition Greeter	

=== Television ===
Year	Title	Role	Notes
2004	The Smoking Gun TV	Actor	Episode: "Year-end Special"
2011	The Daily Show	Qu'osby Neighbor	Episode: "Ed Gillespie"
2014	Hot in Cleveland	Real Estate Agent	Episode: "Playmates"
2015–17	Hand of God	Nathan Brooks	Recurring Cast
2019	Sorry, Ari	Sal	Episode: "On Broadway"
2020	AJ and the Queen	Kevin	Episode: "Dallas"
2022	Billions	Host	Episode: "Hindenburg"
2022	The Blacklist	Marshal Rupert Gwynn	Episode: "Andrew Kennison (No. 185)"

=== Video games ===
Year	Title	Role	Notes
2010	Red Dead Redemption	The Local Population	
2013	Grand Theft Auto V	Floyd Hebert	Also motion capture
2018	Red Dead Redemption 2	The Local Pedestrian Population	
