= Cadet Kelly =

2002 television film by Larry Shaw

- Promotional poster
- Genre: Comedy, teen, romance
- Written by: Gail Parent; Michael Walsh
- Directed by: Larry Shaw
- Starring: Hilary Duff; Christy Carlson Romano
- Music by: David Kitay
- Country of origin: United States
- Original language: English

Production
- Executive producers: Jerry Leider; Robert Shapiro
- Producer: Kevin Lafferty
- Cinematography: Frank Byers
- Editor: Anita Brandt-Burgoyne
- Running time: 96 minutes
- Production company: Leider/Shapiro Productions

Original release
- Network: Disney Channel
- Release: March 8, 2002

Cadet Kelly is a 2002 American military comedy film released as a Disney Channel Original Movie and starring Hilary Duff and Christy Carlson Romano. The film premiered with 7.8 million viewers. It is Duff's second starring film role, her first being Casper Meets Wendy. The film premiered on Disney Channel on March 8, 2002.

== Plot ==
Kelly Collins is a free-spirited high schooler whose mother marries Brigadier General Joe "Sir" Maxwell. When her new stepfather becomes the Commandant of a military school, George Washington Military Academy, Kelly and her mother move upstate. Kelly has to enroll at the school, since it is the only school in the area, leaving behind her art school and her best friend Amanda. On her first day at military school, she befriends Carla, a girl who has been there for a long time and shows her the ropes. Kelly, at first, has trouble fitting in and obeying the orders of the officers above her, especially Cadet Captain Jennifer Stone, who has a crush on Cadet Major Brad Rigby. Kelly feels drawn to Brad instantly, and competes with Captain Stone for his attention. Captain Stone does not treat Kelly well, verbally abusing her by calling her "maggot" and destroying her personal belongings.

After taking a long time to complete an obstacle course, Captain Stone has Kelly take the course again. After getting all dirty from the course and finishing it, Kelly heads to the dance, but accidentally stumbles and ruins Captain Stone's dress at the dance, much to her anger. Her stepfather talks to Kelly in his office about the incident and what the teachers are saying about her. At home, Kelly is ready to tell her mom about her feelings and opinions of the new school, but before she could even start, her mother reveals to her that Kelly is going to have a half-sibling. Seeing that her mom needs her support, she vows to help her stepfather learn how to take care of a child and make him "ready" to be a dad. To get back at Captain Stone for destroying one of her blankets, Kelly decides to paint Stone's hair in the middle of the night as revenge, in the same pattern as a blanket that Stone ruined.

The next day, Captain Stone gives Kelly a citation, so she is forced to appear in Cadet Court. In Cadet Court, she is found guilty of many infractions. She is sentenced by her stepfather to take care of and shine the uniforms of the drill team, which she had, earlier in the film, referred to as a team of robots. However, she gradually takes a liking to them and decides to try out for the team, seeing that they need some inspiration. With the help of another friend of hers, Gloria, she practices enough and makes to the team.

After Kelly was following some moves that Captain Stone was practicing, Cadet Major Rigby made the suggestion that they could incorporate the moves into a routine for regionals. Kelly asks Captain Stone if they could work on a routine together for regionals, and Captain Stone agrees to discuss it with her. Kelly's team makes it to the regionals, which will be held at a different school. Kelly's dad surprises her by revealing that he will be working a job nearby, and can make it to the regionals to see her perform. The day of the competition, however, he does not show up and Kelly begins to worry. Her stepfather notices that she is distressed and asks her to explain the situation to him. Kelly tells him that she has received a phone call from her father that was cut off, which she finds strange. She refers to her cell phone as her and her father's "lifeline", and says that he would only call if it was an absolute emergency. Seeing that Kelly needs help, he excuses her from the competition and goes with her to the location her father said he would be. They find him on a cliff, as he has fallen down. Kelly doesn't want to leave him alone, so she uses her new training to rappel down the cliffside and stay by her father. Joe calls for help, and a rescue team arrives to bring him and Kelly back up. After her stepfather hugs her instead of saluting her, Kelly realizes that Joe has become more fatherly, she tells both of her dads that she is proud to be their daughter.

Kelly runs back to the competition to find that they are down by five points. The only chance they have of winning is a special routine that Kelly and Stone had been practicing. They perform it, and receive excellent marks from the reviewing board. George Washington places second, the best they have ever done, by one point. Stone tells Kelly that if she hadn't joined the team, they never would have made it that far. Kelly, overjoyed to hear Stone praise her for once, gives her a hug, which she is surprised by, but returns anyway. Kelly vows that they will win next year as long as she and Stone keep practicing their routine, but Stone reveals that she's moving to Europe because her father, who is in the Army, has been transferred there. Stone tells Kelly that she'd like for Kelly to one day become a platoon leader and have to deal with a "maggot" just like her. The drill team then faces Joe who salutes them for a job well done and Kelly smiles and salutes him alone, which he returns.

== Cast ==
- Hilary Duff as Kelly Joselyn Collins
- Christy Carlson Romano as Cadet Captain Jennifer Oriana "Jenny" Stone
- Gary Cole as General Joe "Sir" Maxwell
- Andrea Lewis as Carla
- Shawn Ashmore as Cadet Major Brad Rigby
- Aimee Garcia as Gloria Ramos
- Sarah Gadon as Amanda
- Linda Kash as Samantha Collins-Maxwell
- Nigel Hamer as Adam Collins
- Avery Saltzman as Kevin
- Joe Matheson as General Archer
- Beverlee Buzon as Grace
- Dalene Irvine as Marla
- Desmond Campbell as Lieutenant Colonel Ross
- Tim Post as Colonel Mikkelson
- Christopher Tai as Senior Cadet Officer
- Josh Wittig as Cadet Bugler
- Edie Inksetter as Math Teacher
- Stewart Arnott as Captain Lawrence
- Lt. William T. Bates as Military Advisor
- Martin Roach as Drill Instructor

== Production ==
Primary filming for the school scenes lasted from July to September 2001, and was done at the Robert Land Academy, a military school in Canada. There were also some scenes that were taken in St. Andrew's College, a private school and Loretto Abbey Catholic Secondary School, also in Ontario, Canada. Hilary Duff was made an honorary Cadet Sergeant of the school during the production. The military advisor for the film, Lt. William T. Bates, drilled the actors in a "boot camp"-style situation, often testing them with rehearsals of complicated rifle and close order drill routines. The final scene was shot at the Canadian Forces Fort York Armoury in Toronto, Ontario.
