= Greatest Disney TV & Film Hits =

Compilation album by Christy Carlson Romano
- Released: October 26, 2004
- Recorded: 2003–2004
- Genre: Pop
- Length: 25:30
- Label: Walt Disney
- Producer: George Gabriel, Matthew Gerrard, Adrian Gurvitz, Jay Landers, Cory Lerios, Tony Phillips, Steve Tyrell

Professional ratings
Review scores
Source	Rating
Allmusic	2.3 stars on a 5 point scale
Film Score Monthly	2/5 stars

Greatest Disney TV & Film Hits is a greatest hits compilation of Disney songs performed by actress and singer Christy Carlson Romano. The album primarily contains Romano's songs previously included on various Disney compilation and soundtrack albums. Three new songs are also included: "Dive In" (which was recorded exclusively for the compilation), "Colors of the Wind", and "Could It Be". To date, it is the first and only solo album released by Romano.

"Colors of the Wind", a cover of the song from the Pocahontas soundtrack, was later included on Disneymania 3 (2005). "Could It Be" was later released in promotion of Kim Possible Movie: So the Drama and included in the 2005 "Kim-Proved" reissue of the Kim Possible soundtrack. "Dream Vacation" from The Even Stevens Movie (2003) makes its audio recording debut on this release, as that film did not have a commercially released soundtrack. "Teacher's Pet" is a cover song from the 1958 film of the same name, which was released for the soundtrack of the 2004 film of the same name.

== Track listing ==
No.	Title	Writer(s)	Origin	Length
1.	"Dive In"	Matthew Gerrard	New recording	3:15
2.	"Let's Bounce"	Gerrard	The Princess Diaries 2: Royal Engagement soundtrack (2004)	3:18
3.	"Anyone But Me"	Gerrard, Bridget Benenate	Zenon: Z3 soundtrack (2004)	3:23
4.	"Colors of the Wind"	Alan Menken, Stephen Schwartz	New recording	3:57
5.	"Say the Word"	Danny Jacob, Janis Liebhart	Kim Possible soundtrack (2003)	2:50
6.	"Could It Be"	George Gabriel, Cory Lerios	New recording	2:51
7.	"Dream Vacation"	John Coda, Jim Wise	The Even Stevens Movie (2003)	3:08
8.	"Teacher's Pet"	Joe Lubin	Teacher's Pet soundtrack (2004)	2:51
