= Fred Meyers =

American retired actor and paramedic (born 1983)

- Born: Fred Leland Meyers; August 8, 1983 (age 42); Fort Leavenworth, Kansas, U.S.
- Occupations: Actor, Paramedic
- Years active: 1998–2007

Fred Leland Meyers (born August 8, 1983) is an American retired actor and paramedic. He had a recurring role as Tom Gribalski in the Disney Channel original series Even Stevens and the follow-up Disney Channel original movie The Even Stevens Movie.

== Career ==
He also co-starred the 2001 film Suspended Animation and opposite Hilary Duff in the 2004 film Raise Your Voice. Meyers also guest starred in the television series 7th Heaven, The Handler and That's So Raven, as well as appearing in the 2005 film Dirty Deeds. His last professional acting role was in the 2007 film Hallowed Ground.

== Filmography ==
Year	Title	Role	Notes
2007	Hallowed Ground	Lanky Teenager	Movie
2006	That's So Raven	Leaf	1 episode
2006	Olympus	Hayden	Short
2005	Boston Legal	Willis Berger	1 episode
2005	Dirty Deeds	Lockett	Movie
2005	Confession	Matt	Movie
2004	Raise Your Voice	Matthew	Movie
2004	The Handler	Sean Miller	1 episode
2003	The Even Stevens Movie	Tom Gribalski	Disney Channel Original Movie
2001	Suspended Animation	Sandor Hansen	Movie
2000-2003	Even Stevens	Tom Gribalski	Disney Channel Original Series; Recurring Role (31 episodes)
1999	7th Heaven	Chad	1 episode
1998	The Catcher	Young Johnny	Movie
