= Donna Pescow =

American actress

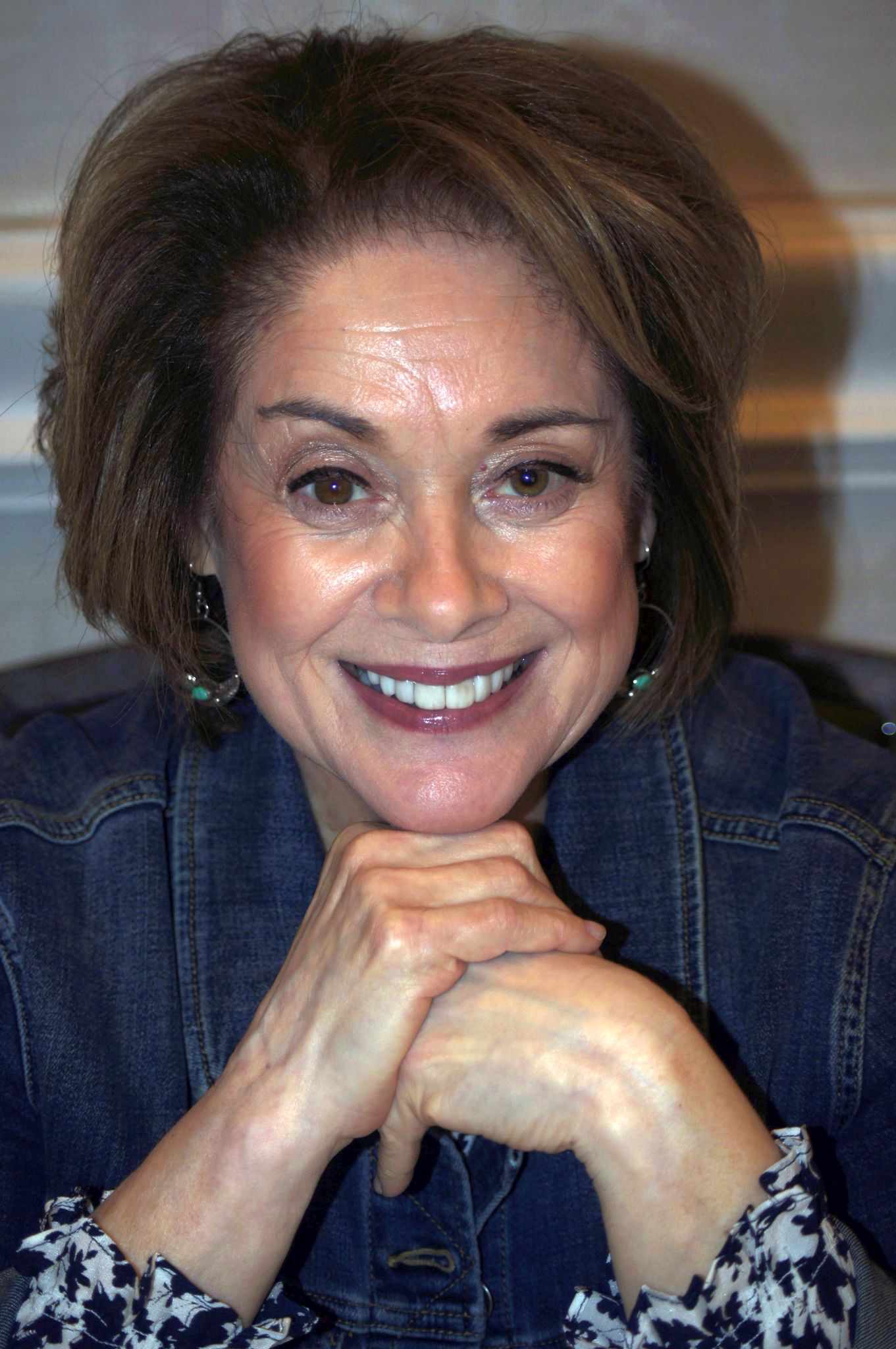
- Pescow in 2023
- Born: Donna Gail Pescow; March 24, 1954 (age 72); New York, New York, U.S.
- Education: Sheepshead Bay High School
- Alma mater: American Academy of Dramatic Arts
- Occupations: Actress; director
- Years active: 1977–present
- Known for: Out of This World; Angie; Even Stevens; Saturday Night Fever
- Spouse: Arnold Zelonka (m. 1987)
- Children: 1

Donna Gail Pescow (born March 24, 1954) is an American film and television actress and director known as Annette in Saturday Night Fever, Angie Falco-Benson in Angie, Donna Garland in Out of This World and Eileen Stevens in Even Stevens.

== Early life ==
Pescow was born in Brooklyn, New York, on March 24, 1954, into a Jewish family. Her father Marty owned and ran a newsstand in downtown Manhattan at 17 Battery Place. Pescow attended Sheepshead Bay High School in Brooklyn and studied at the American Academy of Dramatic Arts. Around 1973, she had a leading role in an Off-off Broadway musical entitled Poor Old Fool, though it closed after just a few weeks.

== Career ==
In 1977, Pescow played Annette in the John Travolta film Saturday Night Fever. To prepare for the role, she had to relearn her Brooklyn accent, which she had significantly reduced for professional reasons. For this role, she was the New York Film Critics' third-place choice for their award for Best Supporting Actress.

Also in 1977, Pescow joined the cast of the ABC soap opera One Life to Live, portraying Celena Arquette. The role proved to be brief, lasting less than a year, but it helped to launch her television career, including roles on two other ABC soap operas in later years.

In 1978, Pescow portrayed one of Judy Garland's older sisters in the television biographical film Rainbow, directed by Jackie Cooper.

She appeared as a celebrity panelist on Match Game in 1978.

Pescow starred in her own television series, Angie, which ran for two seasons from 1979 to 1980 on ABC. Her primary castmates were Robert Hays, Debralee Scott, and fellow New Yorker Doris Roberts.

In 1982, Pescow was cast in the role of Dr. Lynn Carson, the first lesbian on a daytime serial, on the soap opera All My Children, which she played until 1983. After her run on All My Children ended, Pescow landed the role of Donna Garland in the first-run syndication children's comedy series Out of This World in 1987, starring with Maureen Flannigan and Joe Alaskey. She stayed with the show until its cancellation in 1991.

After Out of This World ended, Pescow went on to a series of smaller roles before returning to prominent television roles. She made guest appearances on the shows Clueless, NYPD Blue, Pauly and Ivory Tower, and in the 1998 television film Dead Husbands.

Pescow appeared on the ABC soap opera General Hospital from 1999 to 2001 as the villainous Gertrude Morgan, the evil aunt of Chloe Morgan (Tava Smiley). In 2001, Smiley was released from her General Hospital contract and Pescow's character was written out. During her run on General Hospital, Pescow also had a small role in the television film Partners and guest starred on the television series Philly.

In 1999, Disney contacted Pescow about appearing in a half-hour youth sitcom for the network. A pilot was filmed in 2000, and the series went on to become Even Stevens. It aired for three seasons on Disney Channel, from 2000 to 2003. She also directed three episodes of the series, which became a flagship for the network. After the series ended in 2003, Pescow and the rest of the cast returned for the finale film The Even Stevens Movie.

After taking several years off following Even Stevens, Pescow appeared in the film One Sung Hero alongside Nicole Sullivan. She then took another brief break from acting, but she did appear in a 2006 episode of Crossing Jordan. In 2007, Pescow appeared in the series finale of The Sopranos as Donna Parisi, the wife of mobster Patsy Parisi.

In 2023, Pescow made a cameo appearance alongside John Travolta in a Capital One Christmas ad, as the cashier in a shoe store that Santa (Travolta) visits.

== Filmography ==
- 1977: One Life to Live (TV series) – Celena Arquette
- 1977: Saturday Night Fever – Annette
- 1978: Human Feelings (TV movie) – Gloria Prentice
- 1978: Rainbow (TV movie) – Jinnie Gumm
- 1979: Angie (TV series) – Angie Falco Benson, 36 episodes (1979–1980)
- 1979: The Love Boat (TV series) – Connie / Gwen Winters S2 E18/ Irene (1979–1986)
- 1981: Advice to the Lovelorn (TV movie) – Janice Vernon
- 1982: Cassie & Co. (TV series)
- 1982: The Day the Bubble Burst (TV movie) – Gloria Block
- 1983: All My Children (TV series) – Dr. Lynn Carson
- 1983: Fantasy Island (TV series) – Carol Bowen / Paula Santino (1983–1984)
- 1983: Hotel (TV series) – Cathy Connelly / Gloria Beck / Susan Garfield (1983–1987)
- 1983: Policewoman Centerfold (TV movie) – Sissy Owens
- 1983: Trapper John, M.D. (TV series) – Linda D'Amico
- 1984: Finder of Lost Loves (TV series) – Anne Sherman
- 1985: Obsessed with a Married Woman (TV movie) – Susan
- 1985: Mr. Belvedere (TV series) – Candy
- 1986: Jake Speed – Wendy
- 1986: Murder, She Wrote (TV series) – Cornelia
- 1987: Glory Years (TV movie) – Norma
- 1987: Out of This World (TV series) – Donna Garland (Main Role), 96 episodes (1987–1991)
- 1994: Kenny Kingston Psychic Hotline (paid programming) with Ted Lange
- 1996: Nash Bridges (TV series) (episode: "Hit Parade")
- 1997: Clueless (TV series) – Sheila Kendall
- 1997: NYPD Blue (TV series) – Mrs. Carol Buono
- 1997: Pauly (TV series) – Ariana
- 1998: Dead Husbands (TV movie) – Rosemary Monroe
- 1998: Ivory Tower – Bonnie Benitez
- 1999: General Hospital (TV series) – Gertrude Morgan (1999–2001)
- 2000: Partners (TV movie) – Bob's Wife
- 2000: Even Stevens (TV series) – Eileen Stevens / Bubbie Rose, 65 episodes (2000–2003)
- 2002: Philly (TV series) – Ronnie Garfield
- 2003: The Even Stevens Movie (TV movie) – Eileen Stevens
- 2006: One Sung Hero (short) – Karen
- 2007: Crossing Jordan (TV series) – Debbie's Mother
- 2007: The Sopranos (TV series) – Donna Parisi
- 2010: Cold Case (TV series) – Nancy Kent '10
- 2012: Operation Cupcake (TV movie) – Sheila
- 2013: Holiday Road Trip (TV movie) – Margaret
- 2017: New Girl (TV series) – Priscilla (episode: "San Diego")
- 2017: The Flash (TV series) – Dr. Sharon Finkel, 5 episodes (2017–2018)
- 2019: Carol of the Bells – Jackie
- 2023: Welcome to Chippendales (TV series) – Bridget (Jewellery Store) (episode: "February 31st")
