= Margo Harshman =

American actress (born 1986)

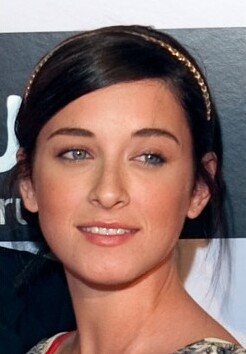
- Harshman in January 2009
- Born: March 4, 1986 (age 40); San Diego, California, U.S.
- Occupation: Actress
- Years active: 1997–present
- Spouse: Austin Hooks (m. 2017; div. 2018)

Margo Harshman (born March 4, 1986) is an American actress. She is known for playing Tawny Dean on Even Stevens, Alex Jensen on The Big Bang Theory, and Delilah Fielding-McGee on NCIS.

== Early life and family ==
Margo Harshman was born March 4, 1986, in San Diego, California, to David James Harshman and Janelle Louise Sorenson, who died in 2014 from breast cancer. She has two older sisters and an older brother.

== Career ==
Harshman's grandmother entered her in a beauty pageant at the age of two. In 2000, she was cast in the Disney Channel sitcom Even Stevens as Tawny Dean, the female best friend of series lead Louis. Harshman appeared in 47 episodes in the show's three-year run and reprised the role for the 2003 movie. Beginning in 2012, she appeared in The Big Bang Theory as Alex Jensen, the assistant of Sheldon Cooper, and the following year debuted in the long-running series NCIS as Delilah Fielding, the wheelchair user wife of Timothy McGee who works as an intelligence analyst at the US Department of Defense. Harshman starred on the short-lived TV shows Run of the House and Center of the Universe. Her film appearances include Sorority Row, College Road Trip and Fired Up!

== Personal life ==
Harshman dated her Even Stevens co-star Shia LaBeouf while they were working on the show together. She married Austin Hooks in 2017, but the couple filed for divorce on November 29, 2018, after an eight-week separation.

== Awards and nominations ==
In 2005, Harshman was nominated for two awards at the Young Artist Awards, one for Best Performance in a TV Movie, Miniseries or Special by a Supporting Young Actress for The Even Stevens Movie (2004) (TV) and the other for Best Performance in a TV Series (Comedy or Drama) by a Supporting Young Actress for Even Stevens (2001). In 2009, Harshman won the ShoWest "Female Stars of Tomorrow" award at the ShoWest Convention along with fellow Sorority Row cast members Briana Evigan, Leah Pipes, Rumer Willis, Jamie Chung and Audrina Patridge.

== Filmography ==
=== Film ===
Year	Title	Role	Notes	Ref(s)
1997	The Elf Who Didn't Believe	Jolie	Film debut	
2001	Murphy's Dozen	Bridget		
2003	Recipe for Disaster	Rebecca Korda		
2003	The Even Stevens Movie	Tawny Dean		
2005	Fellowship	Gina		
2006	Simon Says	Kate		
2006	Hiding Victoria	Victoria Walker		
2007	Rise: Blood Hunter	Tricia Rawlins		
2007	Judy's Got a Gun	Maya Spektor		
2008	College Road Trip	Katie		
2008	Keith	Brooke		
2008	From Within	Sadie		
2008	Legacy	Nina	Also known as Pretty Little Devils	
2008	Extreme Movie	Ted's Girlfriend		
2009	Fired Up!	Sylvia		
2009	Sorority Row	Charlene "Chugs" Bradley		
2015	Toxin	Mandy		
2016	Love on the Vines	Diana Armstrong	Hallmark Channel	
2023	Exposure	Nicole	Main role	

=== Television ===
Year	Title	Role	Notes	Ref(s)
2000–2003	Even Stevens	Tawny Dean	47 episodes	
2003–2004	Run of the House	Brooke Franklin	Main cast	
2004	Without a Trace	Harley Palmer	Episode: "Bait"	
2004	Center of the Universe	Sara	2 episodes	
2005	Everwood	Maura	Episode: "Put on a Happy Face"	
2006	Grey's Anatomy	Jennifer Morris	Episode: "Oh, the Guilt"	
2007	Journeyman	Abby Armstrong	Episode: "Winterland"	
2008	90210	Detention girl	Episode: "Hollywood Forever"	
2008	Boston Legal	Margie Coggins	Episode: "Juiced"	
2009	Modern Family	Jungle Tanya	Episode: "Fizbo"	
2010	$#*! My Dad Says	Kim	Episode: "Family Dinner for Schmucks"	
2012	House	Melissa	Episode: "Love Is Blind"	
2012	Bent	Screwsie	6 episodes	
2012–2013	The Big Bang Theory	Alex Jensen	4 episodes	
2013	Betas	Lisa	4 episodes	
2013	Bones	Alison Kidman	Episode: "The Fury in the Jury"	
2014	CSI: Crime Scene Investigation	April Brock	Episode: "Rubbery Homicide"	
2013–present	NCIS	Delilah Fielding	18 episodes	
2022	How I Met Your Father	Mia	Episode: "Stacey"	

=== Music videos ===
Year	Title	Artist	Notes	Ref(s)
2009	"Get U Home"	Shwayze		
2021	"The Devil In Me"	Garrison Starr		
