= Steven Anthony Lawrence =

American actor

- Occupation: Actor
- Years active: 1996–present

Steven Anthony Lawrence is an American actor. He is best known for his recurring role as Bernard "Beans" Aranguren in the hit Disney Channel Original Series Even Stevens (2001–2003). He also appeared in movie roles including The Cat in the Hat (2003) and Kicking & Screaming (2005).

== Career ==
Besides his role in Even Stevens, Lawrence's other television credits are That's So Raven, Married... with Children, ER, Frasier, and The Amanda Show, among others. He has appeared in the feature films Cheaper by the Dozen, Kicking & Screaming, Rebound, and Jay and Silent Bob Strike Back (in a deleted scene). He appeared in several music videos including "Father of Mine" by Everclear, "Spotlight" by Marshmello & Lil Peep, and "Lay with Me" by Phantoms & Vanessa Hudgens. He has appeared in 2011 as a pink elf in a T-Mobile holiday commercial and in 2012 in a dog costume for an Old Spice commercial.

Lawrence previously co-hosted the Even More Stevens Podcast alongside Christy Carlson Romano and Nick Spano. Its title is a reference to the television series Even Stevens (2001–2003), in which all three hosts appeared. The podcast ran from March to July 2023 and has 22 episodes. In August 2023, Romano announced on Instagram that the podcast would be paused until SAG-AFTRA negotiations were resolved, however, it did not resume.

== Filmography ==
Year	Title	Role	Notes
2026	The Floor, season 5	Self	
2022	Bad Therapist	Stanley	1 episode
2020	The List	Ted	Short
2018	I Wrote This for You	Cafe Guy	Movie
2017	Her Side of the Bed	Himself	Movie
2014	Randy App	Chris	1 episode
2013	Holly, Jingles and Clyde 3D	Jingles	Movie
2012	Eagleheart	Gabey	1 episode
2011	A Day Without Rain	Cashier	Short
2011	Death to Snooki	Jimmy	Short
2011	Shapetown, USA	Max	1 episode
2011	It's a Cardboard Life	Benny	1 episode
2010	Weeds	Keith	1 episode
2009	Archie's Final Project	Brainiac	Movie
2007	Bratz	Plunger Man	Movie
2006	Dance Revolution	Celebrity Judge	2 episodes
2005	Rebound	Ralph	Movie
2005	Kicking & Screaming	Mark Avery	Movie
2003	Cheaper by the Dozen	Dylan Shenk	Movie
2003	Dr. Seuss' The Cat in the Hat	Dumb Schweitzer	Movie
2003	The Even Stevens Movie	Bernard "Beans" Aranguren	Disney Channel Original Movie
2003	That's So Raven	Miles Bonay	1 episode
2002	13 Moons	Stevie	Movie
2001	Buffy the Vampire Slayer	Chunky Kid	1 episode
2001	ER	John Thomas Frum	1 episode
2001	Bubble Boy	Ice Cream Boy	Movie
2002–2005	Express Yourself	Himself	Interstitial series
2001–2003	Even Stevens	Bernard "Beans" Aranguren	Disney Channel Original Series; Recurring Role (22 episodes)
2001–2002	Frasier	Jason White/Kid	2 episodes
2000	Shriek If You Know What I Did Last Friday the Thirteenth	Chuckie	Movie
2000	Absolutely True		1 episode
1999	Lord of the Road	Billy	Short
1999	The Muse	Rob Reiner's Son	Movie
1999	Sabrina, the Teenage Witch	Little Kid	1 episode
1999	My Favorite Martian	Nurplex Kid	Movie
1999	Operation Splitsville	Billy's Friend	Movie
1999	Dreamers	Matthew	Movie
1999–2000	The Amanda Show	Justin/Younger Brother	3 episodes
1998	Michael Hayes	Jacob's Son	1 episode
1996	Married... with Children	Kid #1	1 episode; S11:E8 - God Help Ye Merry Bundymen
