= Michelle Hodkin =

American novelist

Michelle Hodkin is an American New York Times bestselling author, and the creator of the Mara Dyer Trilogy, consisting of The Unbecoming of Mara Dyer, The Evolution of Mara Dyer, and The Retribution of Mara Dyer.

== Early life and education ==
Hodkin grew up in South Florida, United States, to a Jewish family.

Graduating with an English degree from New York University, Hodkin intended to pursue a career in academia. Hodkin instead attended law school in Michigan immediately upon graduation. She completed her Juris Doctor degree at the age of 23.

== Career ==
Before publishing her debut novel, she worked as a lawyer, specializing in anti-terrorism litigation. She primarily worked on behalf of the victims of terror and family members for the 9/11 multi-district litigation as well as the case Almog Vs. Arab Bank. While working as a lawyer, Hodkin split her time between New York, Charleston, and Tel Aviv.

Her first novel, was published in 2011. Her second novel, The Evolution of Mara Dyer, and the second book in the Mara Dyer Trilogy came out quickly after in 2012, while her third novel, The Retribution of Mara Dyer, and the final book in the trilogy was published in 2014.

Simon & Schuster Books for Young Readers announced Hodkin's newest project — a spin-off series written from the perspective of Noah Shaw, a character from the Mara Dyer Trilogy --The Shaw Confessions in 2015.

The first book of The Shaw Confessions, The Becoming of Noah Shaw, was originally published November 2017.

The second book of The Shaw Confessions, The Reckoning of Noah Shaw was published November 2018

The final book of the trilogy, The Last Confessions of Mara Dyer and Noah Shaw is projected to be released by Simon & Schuester August 31, 2021

== Personal life ==
Michelle Hodkin has spoken at length about animal rights, and has previously adopted four pets. "When I’m not writing, which isn’t very often, I can usually be found prying strange objects from the jaws of one of my ... rescued pets"

== Books published ==
The Mara Dyer Trilogy

1. The Unbecoming of Mara Dyer

2. The Evolution of Mara Dyer

3. The Retribution of Mara Dyer

The Shaw Confessions Trilogy

1. The Becoming of Noah Shaw

2. The Reckoning of Noah Shaw
