= Even Stevens =

American comedy television series (2000–2003)

- Genre: Comedy
- Created by: Matt Dearborn
- Starring: Shia LaBeouf; Christy Carlson Romano; Nick Spano; Tom Virtue; Donna Pescow
- Theme music composer: John Coda
- Composer: John Coda
- Country of origin: United States
- Original language: English
- No. of seasons: 3
- No. of episodes: 65 (list of episodes)

Production
- Executive producers: David Brookwell; Sean McNamara (both; entire run); Dennis Rinsler; Marc Warren (both; episode 7+); Matt Dearborn (season 3)
- Cinematography: Mark Doering-Powell
- Camera setup: Film; Single-camera
- Running time: 22 minutes
- Production company: Brookwell McNamara Entertainment

Original release
- Network: Disney Channel
- Release: June 17, 2000 – June 2, 2003

Related
- The Even Stevens Movie (2003)

Even Stevens is an American comedy television series produced by Brookwell McNamara Entertainment that originally aired on Disney Channel from June 17, 2000, to June 2, 2003, airing a total of 65 episodes spanning three seasons. It follows the life of the Stevens, a family living in suburban Sacramento, California, mainly focusing on the clashing personalities of its two younger teenage children, Ren and Louis.

The series was produced by Brookwell McNamara Entertainment. It is generally remembered for starring an adolescent Shia LaBeouf before he achieved mainstream success as an actor. The show also features fast motion photography, which it employs in every episode.

The feature-length Disney Channel Original Movie based on the series, The Even Stevens Movie, premiered on June 13, 2003, and serves as the series finale. The show ended after reaching the 65-episode limit that Disney Channel had at the time.

== Premise ==
Steve and Eileen Stevens live in Sacramento, California. They have three teenage children; and the two younger children in the family, Ren and Louis, who have opposing personalities, often clash.

== Episodes ==
Season	Episodes	Originally released	
Season	Episodes	First released	Last released
1	21	June 17, 2000	February 23, 2001
2	22	June 15, 2001	February 15, 2002
3	22	February 22, 2002	June 2, 2003
TV film		June 13, 2003	

== Characters ==
=== Main ===
- Louis Anthony Stevens (Shia LaBeouf) – Louis, the youngest Stevens sibling, is viewed as immature, rude, lazy, selfish, carefree, and extremely mischievous. He concocts elaborate schemes and inventions to make his life easier. His entire family is viewed as perfect next to him, which Louis resents. He is always pulling pranks with best friends Alan Twitty and Tawny Dean. His parents seem to favor his sister Ren and brother Donnie because of the great successes both have achieved, but his parents do love him dearly and try to defend him when possible. Louis tends to do "gross" things (weird faces, poor hygiene, picking nose, etc.), much to Ren’s annoyance. While he and Ren get on each other’s nerves all the time, Louis still cares for his sister and will sometimes help and support her. Tawny becomes his girlfriend at the end of the series and they are seen dating in the movie. His birthday is on June 27 (as shown in episode 33).
- Ren Stevens (Christy Carlson Romano) – An intelligent, well behaved, perfectionist 8th grader, Ren is the middle sibling and only daughter. She is the classic overachiever, constantly running for hall monitor and class president while trying to keep Louis's schemes from becoming disasters and ruining her good-girl reputation. Despite finding Louis annoying, Ren does care for her brother’s wellbeing and will often help him get out of trouble. She is the head newscaster for "The Wombat Report" and spent a few weeks on her school's cheerleading squad. Ren is the editor of the school newspaper and the yearbook, a Straight A student, and Principal Wexler's highly valued assistant. She distressed by singing karaoke. Despite her top-student ranking, Ren got sentenced to, and served, detention on at least two occasions. Ren's favourite colour is purple.
- Donnie Stevens (Nick Spano) – Ren and Louis' athletic older brother. Donnie is highly concerned with his appearance. His popularity, looks, and athletic skills made him a heartthrob and legend at their school, even after his graduation. He is often depicted as unintelligent and rarely knows what is going on. Donnie does have knowledge in hair, skin, and nails. After the last episode Donnie graduates from high school. He leaves for college in The Even Stevens Movie.
- Steve Stevens (Tom Virtue) – A lawyer and the patriarch of the Stevens family. He played college football for Michigan State University with the nickname "Stiffie" Stevens. He is a Christian man and used to be a wrestler for his school. His catch phrase is to shout, "Louis!".
- Eileen Stevens (Donna Pescow) – The matriarch of the Stevens family; a successful, no-nonsense, Jewish American state senator who launched a campaign for the U.S. House of Representatives in 2002 and was narrowly defeated.

=== Recurring ===
- Alan Twitty (A. J. Trauth) – Louis' best friend. Referred to as Twitty by his friends, he is similar to Louis but usually is not as extreme and often has to get Louis out of situations. He participates in sports such as basketball and baseball, plays guitar, and sings. Twitty's catch phrases are "Dude" and "Sweet". When going undercover with Louis he goes by the name "Lars Honeytoast." Twitty has a little brother named Milton. Louis and Tawny babysit Milton for Twitty so he can go to the school dance in "All About Yvette".
- Tawny Dean (Margo Harshman) – Louis' best friend and eventually his girlfriend. At first, Tawny has no friends and is an outsider until she meets Louis. Tawny usually dresses in goth and punk clothing, unlike her classmates, and refuses to conform to others' pursuits. She is usually the voice of reason. Tawny enjoys singing, poetry, and playing the keyboard. Tawny's parents are both psychologists.
- Ruby Mendel (Lauren Frost) – Ren's best friend who loves to gossip about crushes and dating couples. She once was attracted to Louis (while under the spell of a lucky penny), in the same episode that she was infatuated with boy band BBMak. Ruby loves talking. Ruby speaks with a heavy Chicago accent.
- Tom Gribalski (Fred Meyers) – Louis' nerdy best friend. When Louis cooks up a scheme, Tom usually plays along with him. Also, Tom speaks in a very scientific, philosophical, and intelligent manner. He is commonly the victim of many pranks by Louis and Twitty. He calls his mother by her name (Doris). In season 3, Doris is seen playing the piano when Tom auditions for SACCY, a performing arts school.
- Monique Taylor (Kenya Williams) – Ren's other best friend. Monique is a peppy cheerleader. Monique takes many things to extreme limits. She has a strong Southern accent.
- Nelson Minkler (Gary LeRoi Gray) – Ren's childhood best friend who seems to be allergic to everything and overprotects himself when he's outside. He is usually with Ren, and at times Donnie, but has spoken to Louis only once. He is fluent in French. Nelson was also Gray's character's name on The Cosby Show as a child.
- Bernard "Beans" Aranguren (Steven Anthony Lawrence) – The Stevens' extremely annoying neighbor, who comes into their home uninvited, makes himself at home, and refuses to leave. His love for bacon is a recurring theme, and in "Little Mr. Sacktown" he visits a bacon shack. He eventually turns into a sidekick for Louis and Twitty's schemes, usually double crossing the two. Beans looks up to Louis.
- Lawrence Anthony "Larry" Beale (Ty Hodges) – Ren's nasty, equally popular, charismatic, know-it-all rival in school. Larry is jealous of Ren and always tries to destroy her reputation, but his schemes usually backfire. His favorite victim is Ren, but he occasionally tries to ruin Louis' reputation as well. Larry considers Louis a threat, but will never admit it. Larry is an Army brat. In the movie, he hinted that he has a crush on her, as he shows a bit of jealousy when it showed that Ren was sharing a kiss with an actor on "Family Fakeout" and was also interested of how the Stevens family turned the tables on Miles.
- Coach Terry Tugnut (Jim Wise) – The gym coach who is always tough on Louis but crazy about Donnie, Larry and food. He loves to eat. Once he weighed over 300 lbs. He is frequently the victim of Louis' pranks. Coach Tugnut often serves as Wexler's enforcer/sidekick. He is obsessed with dodgeball and with the three "major points" (arm, head, stomach). Coach Tugnut favors Donnie and Larry. A running gag throughout the series is Coach Tugnut shouting, "Stevens!" when Louis causes trouble.
- Principal Conrad Wexler (George Anthony Bell) – The principal of Lawrence Jr High. Principal Wexler favors Ren over the other students. They have had arguments, but they're good friends. Ren is his student assistant, while Louis drives him crazy. He usually makes Ren do his dirty work.
- Carla and Marla (Lisa Foiles and Krysten Leigh Jones) – Two girls who look up to Ren. Carla and Marla are both on the newspaper staff with Ren and Ruby. After the episode "Quest for Coolness", Carla and Marla aren't seen or mentioned again.
- Charlotte (Shannon Marshall) - Ren's best friend. After Charlotte's childhood best friend Yvette moves to San Francisco Ren gets jealous. Eileen has a talk with Ren. She explains that you're allowed to have more than one best friend. Ren tells Yvette the same thing when she finds out Yvette is jealous of her. Ren, Charlotte, and Yvette all become best friends. After "All About Yvette" Charlotte isn't seen or mentioned again.
- Bobby Deaver (Brandon Davis) – Ren's middle-school boyfriend; he appeared in seven episodes. Ren broke up with Bobby when he was cheating on her by dating Mandy "Always Gets Her Man" Sanchez, a rival of Ren's.
- Ivan (Eric Jungmann) – Larry Beale's best friend in the first season, although he occasionally serves as a yes-man for other popular kids, such as Blake Thompson in the episode "Louis in the Middle".
- Linda Lovelson (Kelli McCarty) - Ren's science teacher who is part of Steve's bird-watching group.

== Production ==
The show was originally produced as a show called Spivey's Kid Brother. A pilot was filmed and was later picked up by Disney Channel as Even Stevens. In the episode "A Weak First Week" (where the original pilot was repurposed as flashback sequences), Disney had to dub out the name "Spivey" to "Stevens". In fact, in the gym class scene, a banner is visible in the background reading, "Home of Spivey and the Wild Wombats."

In the theme song of the show, clay animations of Louis and Ren turn their remote controls into lightsabers, alluding to Star Wars, several years before Disney would purchase the franchise. Prior to this, Ren reads a TV guide with live-action photos of Christy Carlson Romano and Shia LaBeouf on the cover.

Lawrence Junior High is apparently a three-grade junior high school. Although the show lasted three seasons, the timeline of the show is only two school years, with Louis and his friends remaining in the 7th grade until some point after the middle of the second season. In several third-season episodes there are subtle references to an advance in the timeline that puts Ren and her friends in the 9th grade and Louis in the 8th grade. Ren finally graduates in The Even Stevens Movie.

Shia LaBeouf and Christy Carlson Romano are the only two actors to appear in all 65 episodes of the series.

In 2002, the musical episode "Influenza: The Musical" aired as part of the program's second season, which was viewed favorably by the audience and network executives. Several cast members had backgrounds on Broadway as well as professional dance training. McNamara had done musical theatre in high school and directed the episode, while Brookwell cited the "musical episode" as a television convention. Brookwell stated that network executives were initially unsure that a musical episode would be successful and were uninterested in the subgenre, but the idea was ultimately approved. The success of the musical format led to the idea being adopted on Brookwell and McNamara's other comedy series That's So Raven. It also inspired the development of the television film High School Musical, which then-president of Disney Channels Worldwide Gary Marsh said would not have been possible if not for the success of the Even Stevens episode.

The series was produced and distributed by Disney in North America, while Fireworks Entertainment distributes the series in all other territories.

== Broadcast ==
The series reran on Disney Channel from June 2, 2003 to September 4, 2006. On July 7, 2007, Disney Channel aired eight episodes as part of their "Sometimes You Win, Sometimes You Louis" marathon, to coincide with the release of Shia LaBeouf's film Transformers.

In 2006, Superstation WGN (now NewsNation) acquired the rights to Even Stevens and Lizzie McGuire. It aired on the channel from September 18, 2006 to September 13, 2008, during the week originally airing after each other on weekday afternoons before moving to the late night hours, when both shows' target audiences were generally not awake, with Stevens airing Tuesdays and Thursdays and Lizzie airing the rest of the week.

In 2009, Even Stevens began airing on Disney XD; it was removed from the channel in January 2010.

From 2015 to 2016, Even Stevens aired on Freeform for two hours after midnight on Wednesdays as part of the That's So Throwback block. In the UK, on April 30, 2001, it was reported that the BBC had acquired terrestrial rights to air and re-air the show on CBBC with 21 episodes in 30 minute formats of the show being scheduled to first air later that same year, after having secured a deal with Fireworks Entertainment. All episodes of the show were eventually aired before being re-broadcast on CBBC until December 20, 2008 at 15:00pm. Sometime in 2009, CITV also acquired rights to the show and aired and re-aired the show until sometime in January 2013, taking it off schedule just one week before the rebrand of the channel that same year.

As of August 2026, Even Stevens has returned to Disney XD, along with The Suite Life of Zack & Cody, Wizards of Waverly Place, That's So Raven, Lizzie McGuire, Hannah Montana and Kim Possible.

The series released on November 12, 2019 with the launch of Disney+ in the United States. It is currently not available in all territories where the platform has launched due to different distribution rights in many countries.

== Home media ==
The first season of Even Stevens was made available on DVD on Region 4 in Australia and New Zealand. To date, no further seasons have been released on Region 4. Region 1 has not released any season of the series, however, the television film, The Even Stevens Movie, was made available on DVD (Full Screen only) and VHS on June 28, 2005. In March 2020, the complete series was made available for purchase on iTunes. The series finale film is available on iTunes in non-cropped widescreen.

== Awards and nominations ==
- BAFTA Awards

2002 – Best International – Matt Dearborn, Sean McNamara & David Brookwell (Won)

- Daytime Emmy Awards

2003 – Outstanding Performer in a Children's Series – Shia LaBeouf (Won)
2003 – Outstanding Performer in a Children's Series – Donna Pescow (Nominated)
2003 – Outstanding Children's Series (Nominated)
2002 – Outstanding Children's Series (Nominated)
2002 – Outstanding Performer in a Children's Series – Donna Pescow (Nominated)
2001 – Outstanding Children's Series (Nominated)
2001 – Outstanding Performer in a Children's Series – Donna Pescow (Nominated)

- Directors Guild of America

2003 – Outstanding Directorial Achievement in Children's Programs – Gregory Hobson for episode "Band On The Roof" (Nominated)
2002 – Outstanding Directorial Achievement in Children's Programs – Sean McNamara for episode "Very Scary Story" (Nominated)
2001 – Outstanding Directorial Achievement in Children's Programs – Paul Hoen for episode "Take My Sister... Please" (Nominated)
2001 – Outstanding Directorial Achievement in Children's Programs – Sean McNamara for episode "Easy Way" (Nominated)

- Young Artist Awards

2004 – Best Performance in a TV Series (Comedy or Drama): Supporting Young Actress – Margo Harshman (Nominated)
2003 – Best Performance in a TV Series (Comedy or Drama): Supporting Young Actor – Steven Anthony Lawrence (Won)
2003 – Best Performance in a TV Series (Comedy or Drama): Supporting Young Actress – Lauren Frost (Nominated)
2002 – Best Performance in a TV Comedy Series: Leading Young Actress – Christy Carlson Romano (Won)
2002 – Best Performance in a TV Series (Comedy or Drama): Supporting Young Actress – Lauren Frost (Won)
2002 – Best Performance in a TV Comedy Series: Leading Young Actor -Shia LaBeouf (Nominated)
2002 – Best Performance in a TV Comedy Series: Leading Young Actor – A.J. Trauth (Nominated)
2002 – Best Performance in a TV Comedy Series: Supporting Young Actor – Steven Anthony Lawrence (Nominated)
2001 – Best Performance in a TV Comedy Series: Leading Young Actress – Christy Carlson Romano (Won)
2001 – Best Performance in a TV Comedy Series: Leading Young Actor – Shia LaBeouf (Nominated)
2001 – Best Performance in a TV Comedy Series: Guest Starring Young Performer – Ty Hodges (Nominated)

- Young Star Awards

2000 – Best Young Actor/Performance in a Comedy TV Series – Shia LaBeouf (Nominated)
