= Teacher's Pet (song) =

1956 song by Joe Lubin

Song by Doris Day

from the album Teachers's Pet Soundtrack
- B-side: "A Very Precious Love"
- Released: 1958
- Genre: Pop
- Length: 2:38
- Label: Columbia
- Songwriter: Joe Lubin

"Teacher's Pet" is a pop song written by Joe Lubin and published around 1956.

The song was introduced in the film of the same name by Doris Day, in 1958. While the lyrics are sung from the point of a view of a student in love with a teacher, in the film Day played a teacher romanced by an adult student (Clark Gable).

Day's version was also issued as a single on Columbia Records, reaching #56 on the Billboard Hot 100 chart and #36 on the Cash Box Top 100 chart.

The song was performed by Parker Posey in the 1997 film Waiting for Guffman.

In 2004, Christy Carlson Romano performed a pop version of the song for the soundtrack of Disney's animated film of the same name and in a subsequent music video.

In 2010, Australian singer Melinda Schneider recorded the song for her Doris Day tribute album "Melinda Does Doris".
