= Christy Carlson Romano =

American actress, podcaster and singer (born 1984)

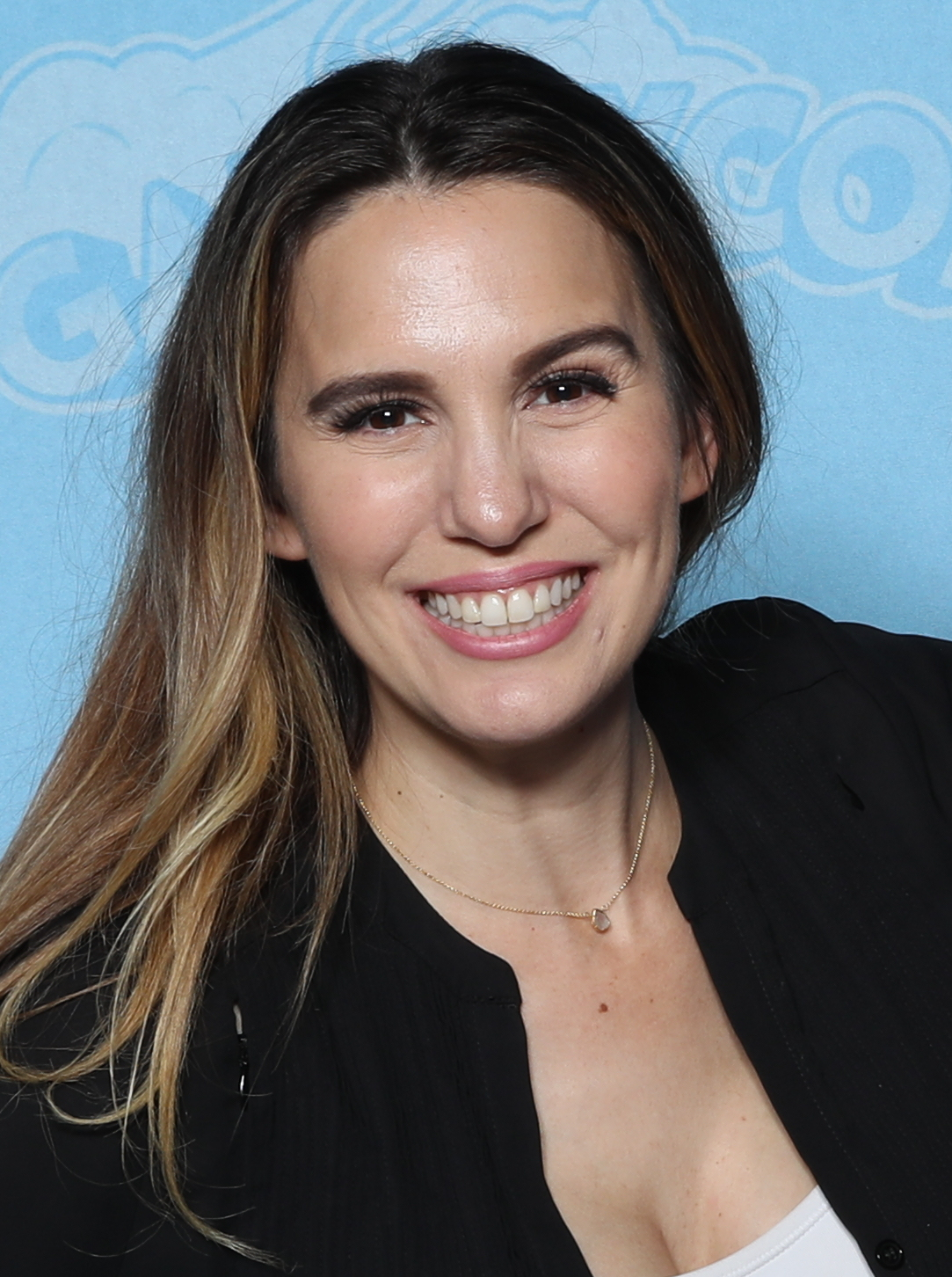
- Romano at the 2019 GalaxyCon Raleigh
- Born: March 20, 1984 (age 42); Milford, Connecticut, U.S.
- Education: Barnard College (BA)
- Occupations: Actress; podcaster; singer
- Years active: 1996–present
- Spouse: Brendan Rooney (m. 2013)
- Children: 2
- Musical career
- Genre: Pop
- Instruments: Vocals; guitar
- Labels: Walt Disney; Virgin; Atlantic

Notes
- (Note: Romano's birthday is March 20. She was 32 years old on December 27, 2016. Her full birthdate, March 20, 1984, is calculated from these two facts.)

Christy Carlson Romano (born March 20, 1984) is an American actress, podcaster, and singer. On the Disney Channel, she played Ren Stevens on Even Stevens, the titular character from Kim Possible, and Cadet Captain Stone in Cadet Kelly.

== Early life ==
Romano was born on March 20, 1984, in Milford, Connecticut, the youngest of four children of Anthony Romano and Sharon (née Carlson). She was raised Catholic and is of Italian descent. Romano began her career at six years old upon being cast in some national tours of Broadway shows, including Annie, The Will Rogers Follies with Keith Carradine, and The Sound of Music with Marie Osmond. She made her first feature film appearance in 1996 as a singing "Chiquita Banana" in Woody Allen's Everyone Says I Love You. She also appeared in Henry Fool (1997) and Looking for an Echo (2000).

== Career ==
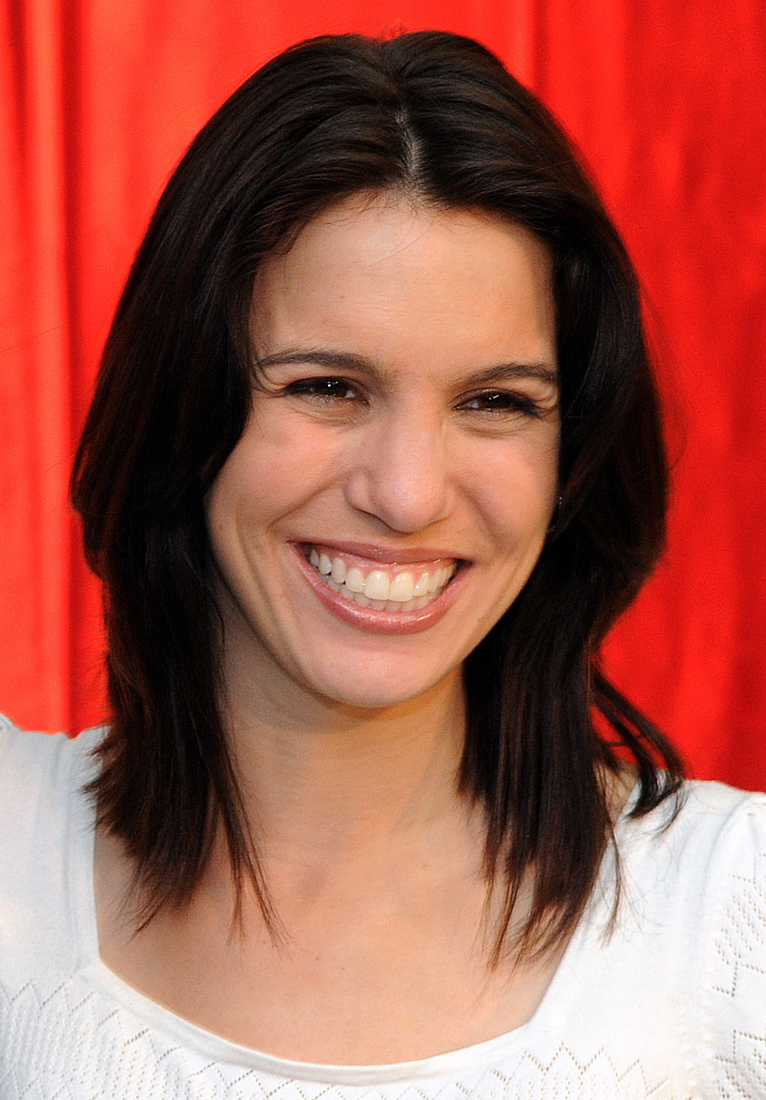
Romano in 2009

=== Film and television ===
In 2002, she acted in three Disney Channel projects simultaneously, supplementing her work on Even Stevens with a starring role in Cadet Kelly, alongside Hilary Duff, and voice acting as the title character in Kim Possible. Romano was nominated for a Daytime Emmy for her work on Kim Possible. The show inspired an adventure scavenger hunt at Disney's Epcot that ran for over five years, as well as two Disney Channel movies: Kim Possible: So the Drama and Kim Possible: A Sitch in Time.

Romano voiced Yuffie Kisaragi in the English version of the movie Final Fantasy VII Advent Children, as well as in the Disney/Square game Kingdom Hearts. Throughout her teens and twenties, she starred in movies for ABC Family and Disney Channel, including Campus Confidential, Taking Five, The Cutting Edge: Going for the Gold, and The Cutting Edge: Chasing the Dream. Various other appearances include MTV's Kaya, CBS' Joan of Arcadia, The WB's Summerland, and TNT's Hawthorne. In 2012, she directed a music video for Steph Gold's "THE SUN", which was accepted into the Los Angeles Shorts Fest 2012. Since her Disney days, Romano has appeared in many films, including Lifetime's Deadly Daycare, Wes Craven's The Girl in the Photographs, Loosies, and Christmas with the Andersons. In March 2016, she directed her first feature, Christmas All Over Again, starring Nickelodeon's Sean Ryan Fox and YouTube star Todrick Hall; Lionsgate released the film for Christmas 2016.

Romano appeared as pop star Poppy Blu in the live-action Kim Possible television movie, which premiered on February 15, 2019. Starting that year, Romano started her own YouTube show called Christy's Kitchen Throwback, in which she would cook recipes with former child actors and Disney stars as guest hosts.

In August 2020, it was announced that Romano would host the cooking show Bucket List Bistro for Fox.

On November 15, 2024, Fox announced that Romano was one of fifteen contestants to appear in the third season of reality quasi-military training television series Special Forces: World's Toughest Test.

In 2026, Romano will portray Nicole in the upcoming Hallmark Channel/Disney collaboration movie Holiday Ever After: A Disney World Wish Come True.

=== Podcasts ===
Romano hosts several podcasts. She hosts Vulnerable where she interviews former child stars. She also hosts I Hear Voices with her former Kim Possible co-star Will Friedle. She also hosts Even More Stevens with her former Even Stevens co-stars Nick Spano and Steven Anthony Lawrence.

In 2023, Romano launched PodCo, a podcast network focused on rewatches hosted by stars of popular TV series such as Wizards of Waverly Place, Ned's Declassified School Survival Guide, Even Stevens, and others.

=== Music ===
While working at Disney, Romano recorded songs for soundtracks for Kim Possible and other Disney projects. She first sang on the Disney Channel in a musical episode of Even Stevens, which led to more singing on the series and across Disney. In 2004, Walt Disney Records released Romano's debut album Greatest Disney TV & Film Hits, a compilation of previously released soundtrack appearances and new material. After her Broadway run of Beauty and the Beast, Romano signed a record deal with Jason Flom at Atlantic Records. Atlantic Records fired Flom before Romano released her first album, and the label did not honor her deal. She continued writing music with Kara DioGuardi and The Matrix, and placed her songs in several movies.

=== Other ventures ===
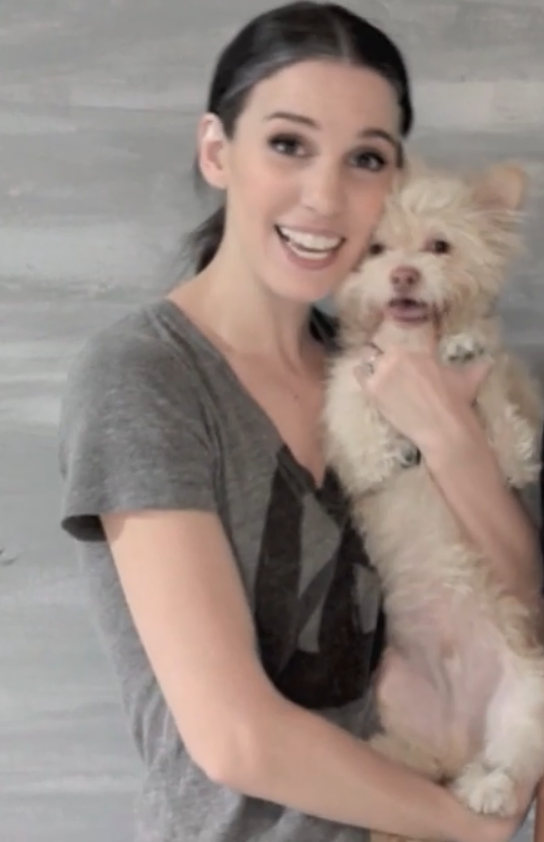
Romano at FashionTails interview in 2015

Romano made her Broadway debut in 1998 as Mary Phagan in the musical Parade by Alfred Uhry and Jason Robert Brown. In February 2004, Romano began a 31-week run as Belle in Disney's Beauty and the Beast on Broadway. Romano was the youngest actress to portray the character on Broadway. She reprised the role in Atlanta's 2005 Fox Theatre production of Beauty and the Beast. In September 2008, she joined the Broadway company of Avenue Q as Kate Monster for several weeks. Romano starred as Michelle off-Broadway in White's Lies at New World Stages in 2010, alongside Betty Buckley and Tuc Watkins.

Romano wrote a novel, Grace's Turn, for Disney literary subsidiary Hyperion, which the New York Public Library (NYPL) named the 2007 Teenage Book of the Year.

After her singing career, Romano began narrating audiobooks, including Pop Princess by Rachel Cohn, The Unbecoming of Mara Dyer trilogy by Michelle Hodkin, and Beautiful Blue World by Suzanne M. LaFleur. She also narrated audiobooks To Catch a Killer by Sheryl Scarborough, Futuristic Violence and Fancy Suits by David Wong, Kaleidoscope Hearts by Claire Contreras, and the Adventures of Owl Series by Kristi Charish. On August 22, 2006, she published her own novel, Grace's Turn, for which she provided the narration as well.

== Personal life ==
After Even Stevens ended, Romano struggled with depression, self-harm, and alcohol abuse during her late teen years and early twenties. Her experience of playing Belle in Beauty and the Beast on Broadway was taxing on her voice, which was already in delicate condition after she had to have surgery to remove vocal nodules right before her audition. She also admitted she pushed her voice past its limit to get through her run while trying to make Disney Theatrical Productions proud.

Romano later attended Barnard College in Manhattan, New York and received her degree in Film Studies. Romano and writer-producer Brendan Rooney met in February 2011 while she was studying at Barnard College. They became engaged in November and, after two years of engagement, married on December 31, 2013 at the Banff Springs Hotel in Banff, Alberta. They have two daughters.

Amidst the COVID-19 pandemic, Romano moved her family to Austin, Texas.

On February 7, 2025, Romano was shot in her right eye in Austin during a clay pigeon shooting outing with Rooney for his 42nd birthday, which was accidentally caused by another party. Rooney assessed the situation and had Romano taken to a hospital. Some of the shrapnel was removed, but one shotgun pellet fragment was lodged behind her eye and was left alone due to being too risky to remove. In June 2025, Romano spoke publicly about the shooting. She revealed that the fragment lodged behind her eye remained, along with another pellet fragment in her forehead.

On February 17, 2026, Romano revealed that she tested positive during a cancer screening. This is not an official cancer diagnosis, and further testing is required to definitively diagnose Romano.

== Filmography ==
=== Film ===
Year	Title	Role	Notes
1996	Everyone Says I Love You	Trick-or-Treat Child	
1997	Henry Fool	Pearl	
1999	Goosed	Gail	
2000	Looking for an Echo	Tina Pirelli	
2005	Final Fantasy VII: Advent Children	Yuffie Kisaragi	Voice role
2007	Taking Five	Danielle Thompson	
2010	The Legend of Secret Pass	Nica	Voice role
2010	Suicide Dolls	Amber	
2010	Movin' In	Ann Beck	
2010	Mirrors 2	Jenna McCarty	
2011	Loosies	Carmen	
2012	Infected	Kelly	
2013	Lucky Dog	Sharon	
2014	Prism	Grace	
2014	Real Love	Brie	Short film
2014	Bear with Us	Quincy Adams	
2015	The Girl in the Photographs	Britney	
2016	Christmas All Over Again	Marilyn	Also director and producer
2017	Blood Circus	Sherry	
2021	Single Mother by Choice	Herself	HBO Max original film

=== Television ===
Year	Title	Role	Notes
1996	The Many Trials of Tammy B	Dani	Television film
1999	Guiding Light	Erica	
2000–2003	Even Stevens	Ren Stevens	Main role
2001	B.S.	Andy Brenner	Television film
2002	Cadet Kelly	Cadet Captain Jennifer Stone	Television film
2002–2007	Kim Possible	Kimberly Ann "Kim" Possible	Lead voice role
2003	The Even Stevens Movie	Ren Stevens	Television film
2003	Kim Possible: A Sitch in Time	Kim Possible	Voice role; television film
2004	Joan of Arcadia	Officious Hall Monitor God	Episode: "The Book of Questions"
2005	Kim Possible: So the Drama	Kim Possible	Voice role; television film
2005	Summerland	Gigi	Episode: "Where There's a Will There's a Wave"
2005	Lilo & Stitch: The Series	Kim Possible	Voice role; episode: "Rufus"
2005	Campus Confidential	Violet	Television film
2006	The Cutting Edge: Going for the Gold	Jackie Dorsey	Television film
2006	Family Guy	Quagmire's One-Night-Stand	Voice role; episode: "I Take Thee, Quagmire"
2006	Casper's Scare School	Mantha	Voice role; television film
2007	Kaya	Kat	3 episodes
2008	The Cutting Edge: Chasing the Dream	Jackie Dorsey	Television film
2009	Hawthorne	Alex	Episode: "Night Moves"
2009	Wolvesbayne	Alex Layton	Television film
2010	Iris Expanding	Zelda	Unsold television pilot
2010	The Penguins of Madagascar	Little Girl #1 / Lunacorn	Voice role; episode: "Hello, Dollface/Huffin and Puffin"
2012	MyMusic	The Devil	Web series; episode: "Sabotage!"
2014	Deadly Daycare	Gabby	Television film
2016	Christmas with the Andersons	Caroline	Television film
2018	Big Hero 6: The Series	Trina	Voice role; 6 episodes
2019	Maternal Instinct	Gloria	Television film
2019	Dream Killer	Grace Rodson	Television film
2019	Kim Possible	Poppy Blu	Television film
2025	Special Forces: World's Toughest Test	Herself	Contestant in season 3
2025–2026	Chibiverse	Kim Possible	Voice role; 2 episodes
2026	Holiday Ever After: A Disney World Wish Come True	Nicole	Upcoming television film

=== Video games ===
Year	Title	Role	Notes
2002	Kingdom Hearts	Yuffie Kisaragi	Voice role
2006	Kim Possible: Revenge of Monkey Fist	Kim Possible	Voice role
2006	Kim Possible: What's the Switch?	Kim Possible	Voice role

== Theater ==
Year	Title	Role	Notes
1990	Annie	Molly	Regional; Atlanta
1992–1994	The Will Rogers Follies	James Rogers	National Tour
1994–1995	The Sound of Music	Marta von Trapp	National Tour
1995	Ruthless	Tina Denmark	Regional; Galveston
1995	The Dr. Seuss Children's Opera	Gertrude McFuzz	Regional; Boston
1996	Night of the Hunter	Mary	Off-Broadway
1997	Spider's Web	Pippa	Regional; Westport/Connecticut Tour
1998–1999	Parade	Mary Phagan	Broadway
1999	Stars in Your Eyes	Jo Jenson	Off-Broadway
2004	Beauty and the Beast	Belle	Broadway
2005	Beauty and the Beast	Belle	Regional; Atlanta
2008	Avenue Q	Kate Monster/Lucy the Slut	Broadway
2010	White's Lies	Michelle	Off-Broadway

== Discography ==
=== Album ===
- Greatest Disney TV & Film Hits (2004)

=== Cast recording ===
- Parade – Original Cast Recording (1999)

=== Other album appearances ===
Title	Year	Album
"Chiquita Banana"	1996	Everyone Says I Love You
"Say the Word"	2003	Kim Possible
"Circle of Life" (among Disney Channel Circle of Stars)	2004	Disneymania 2
"Teacher's Pet"	2004	Teacher's Pet
"Anyone But Me"	2004	Zenon: Z3
"Let's Bounce"	2004	The Princess Diaries 2: Royal Engagement
"Toy Town"	2004	Radio Disney Jingle Jams
"Colors of the Wind"	2005	Disneymania 3
"Best Time of the Year"	2007	Disney Channel Holiday

== Awards and nominations ==
Year	Award	Category	Work	Result	Refs
2001	Young Artist Award	Best Performance in a TV Comedy Series – Leading Young Actress	Even Stevens	Won	
2002	Young Artist Award	Best Performance in a TV Comedy Series – Leading Young Actress	Even Stevens	Won	
2003	Young Artist Award	Best Young Adult Performer in a Teenage Role	The Even Stevens Movie	Nominated	
2005	Daytime Emmy Awards	Outstanding Performer in an Animated Program	Kim Possible	Nominated	
