= The Even Stevens Movie =

2003 television film by Sean McNamara

- Promotional poster
- Genre: Adventure comedy
- Based on: Even Stevens by Matt Dearborn
- Written by: Marc Warren; Dennis Rinsler
- Directed by: Sean McNamara
- Starring: Shia LaBeouf; Christy Carlson Romano; Tom Virtue; Nick Spano; Steven Anthony Lawrence
- Music by: Mark Mothersbaugh
- Country of origin: United States
- Original language: English

Production
- Executive producers: David Brookwell; Sean McNamara; Dennis Rinsler; Marc Warren
- Producer: David Grace
- Cinematography: Christian Sebaldt
- Editor: Gregory Hobson
- Running time: 93 minutes
- Production company: Brookwell McNamara Entertainment

Original release
- Network: Disney Channel
- Release: June 13, 2003

Related
- Even Stevens

The Even Stevens Movie is a 2003 American comedy film released as a Disney Channel Original Movie that is based on the Disney Channel Original Series Even Stevens. It premiered on June 13, 2003, serving as the series finale. The movie drew an audience of 5.1 million viewers.

== Plot ==
With their daughter Ren having graduated from junior high and their oldest son Donnie soon leaving for college, Steve and Eileen Stevens want the family to all spend a memorable summer vacation together, though their youngest son Louis is happy to spend it lounging. Ren's aloof boyfriend Gil breaks up with her; to distract herself from the heartbreak, she accepts a job babysitting Bernard "Beans" Aranguren, who moves in with the family while his parents are away in Helsinki.

Miles McDermott, a man claiming to be from the state department, visits the Stevens family and informs them they have won a trip to the South Pacific island of Mandelino, where they will serve as goodwill ambassadors. With all except Louis excited by the prospect, the family and Beans fly out to Mandelino. Though the locals welcome them at first, Louis accidentally destroys the island's sacred palace, and the locals shun them.

Facing a weeklong wait before they can return home, tensions start to rise within the group. Unbeknownst to them, this is by design: they are in fact on a reality TV series called Family Fakeout, hosted by Miles, who is determined to make the show a success after being ousted as producer of another hidden camera show called Gotcha! Miles creates more tensions within the family, which splits into two factions: Steve, Ren and Beans vs. Eileen, Donnie and Louis. Ren seeks solace with Jason, an actor playing a local called Mootai, who is told to romance her to boost ratings.

Louis's friend Alan Twitty, who informed the production about the Stevens, is overcome with guilt after seeing how they are treated. After he and Louis's girlfriend Tawny Dean learn the family is actually on nearby Catalona Island (named for the real-life Santa Catalina Island), they sail out to rescue them. Shortly after arriving, they are separated and Twitty is intercepted by the show's security, but escapes by posing as an actor. Jason breaks character and almost tells Ren the truth but is stopped by other native actors; Miles has them tell Ren that Louis informed them about her and Mootai, which sees Ren vowing vengeance on her brother.

Twitty cuts the live feed, and while technicians work to get it running again, he and Tawny find the family and tell them the truth. When the feed comes back, an enraged Ren begins pursuing Louis, threatening to kill him. She corners Louis on a cliff, and despite pleas to stop from the family and Miles, who confesses the truth, she pushes Louis off the edge. As Miles breaks down in guilt, Lance LeBow, the host of Gotcha!, appears in a helicopter with Louis safely in tow. While the feed was out, the family planned the prank to get back at Miles, ending his show and career in the process.

Louis tells Ren that while he may play pranks on her, he would never do anything to hurt her. Jason apologizes to Ren for leading her on and confesses that his feelings for her were real. The family returns home to Sacramento, where Ren and Jason begin a relationship, Donnie goes to college, Steve accepts a new job and Louis goes back to lounging with Tawny.

== Cast ==
- Shia LaBeouf as Louis Stevens, the family's prank-loving youngest child
- Christy Carlson Romano as Ren Stevens, the family's studious and well-behaved middle child and only daughter. Ren graduates from middle school and prepares for high school.
- Donna Pescow as Eileen Stevens, a successful no-nonsense Jewish American California state senator and the family matriarch.
- Tom Virtue as Steve Stevens, a lawyer and the family patriarch
- Nick Spano as Donnie Stevens, the family's athletic oldest child who has recently graduated from high school. Donnie leaves for college at the end of the movie.
- Steven Anthony Lawrence as Bernard "Beans" Aranguren, Louis's young sidekick and neighbor
- Tim Meadows as Miles McDermott, the host of Family Fakeout
- A.J. Trauth as Alan Twitty, Louis's best friend
- Margo Harshman as Tawny Dean, Louis's girlfriend
- Fred Meyers as Tom Gribalski, Louis's intelligent friend
- Dave Coulier as Lance LeBow, the host of Gotcha
- Keone Young as "Chief Tuka", an actor who portrays the chief elder of Mandelino
- Lauren Frost as Ruby Mendel, one of Ren's best friends
- Kenya Williams as Monique Taylor, one of Ren's best friends
- Jim Wise as Coach Tugnut, Lawrence Junior High School's gym teacher
- Eric “Ty” Hodges as Larry Beale, Ren's rival classmate who is jealous of her.
- Walker Howard as "Laylo" / Patrick Green, an actor who portrays an island native and Donnie's former classmate
- Josh Keaton as "Mootai" / Jason Holdstead, an actor who portrays a Mandelino native
- Kyle Gibson as Gil
- George Anthony Bell as Principal Wexler, the head of Lawrence Junior High
- Toni Dugan as Keith
- Matthew Yang King as Scott
- Daniele O’Loughlin as Brooke
- Jody Howard as Cynthia Mills

== Reception ==
The Even Stevens Movie was the most-watched cable program on June 13, 2003, including dominating among children ages 6–11 and tweens 9–14, and drawing 5.1 million total viewers.

== Home media ==
The Even Stevens Movie was released on DVD and VHS on June 28, 2005, in Region 1 countries.

The film is available for purchase on iTunes store in non-cropped Widescreen.

As of November 12, 2019, the film, along with the series, are available to stream on Disney+

== See also ==
- List of American films of 2003
