= Jim Wise =

American actor (born 1964)

- Born: James M. Wise; Santa Monica, California, U.S.
- Occupations: Actor, singer, writer, composer
- Years active: 1988–present

James M. Wise is an American actor, singer, writer and composer. He is perhaps best known for his recurring role as Coach Tugnut in the Disney Channel Original Series Even Stevens. He is also known for his voice-over work in video games, movies and TV shows.

Wise's other television acting credits include That's So Raven, JAG, Veronica's Closet, Friends, The Secret World of Alex Mack, Suddenly Susan, Wizards of Waverly Place, Invader Zim and among other series. He also provided the voice of Loud Howard on Dilbert: The Series, played the football announcer in the 2001 film Not Another Teen Movie, and played a resort guest in the 2002 Philip Seymour Hoffman tragicomedy Love Liza.

As a singer and composer, he wrote all the songs featured in the Even Stevens episode "Influenza: The Musical" and wrote the song "Dream Vacation" for The Even Stevens Movie performed by Christy Carlson Romano; as well as three out of the six songs featured in the That's So Raven episode "The Road to Audition". In 2004, he provided the singing voice of SpongeBob SquarePants on the song "Goofy Goober Rock" in The SpongeBob SquarePants Movie. Wise has been nominated for the Primetime Emmy Award for Outstanding Original Music and Lyrics three times for his work on MadTV, winning once in 2006 alongside Greg O'Connor for the song "A Wonderfully Normal Day".

Wise is also an accomplished comedy writer, writing for the series MADtv (where he was once a head writer), Saturday Night Live and The Tonight Show with Jay Leno. He is an alum of The Groundlings comedy troupe.

== Filmography ==
=== TV series ===
- 100 Deeds for Eddie McDowd - Wilard
- Aaahh!!! Real Monsters - Rap Singer, Preacher
- Alright Already - Johnny
- American Dad! - Mr. Durbin
- Batman Beyond - Maddie
- Best Time Ever with Neil Patrick Harris - (writer - 8 episodes)
- Clerks: The Animated Series
- Dilbert - Loud Howard
- Even Stevens - Coach Tugnut
- Father of the Pride - Turkey
- Foxworthy's Big Night Out - (writer - 1 episode)
- Free Ride - The Beeze
- Friends - Kyle
- Heavy Gear: The Animated Series - Von Maddox
- Higglytown Heroes - Fripp, Sanitation Worker Hero
- In Living Color - Himself
- Instant Comedy with the Groundlings - Himself
- Invader Zim - Sizz-Lorr, Goons, Alien #2 (Abductor Green)
- It's Garry Shandling's Show - Game Player
- JAG - Club Emcee, Mickey Gallo
- Just Shoot Me! - Kenny
- Justice League - Bouncer
- Lois & Clark: The New Adventures of Superman - Man #1
- MADtv - Mitch Stein, Cary Eggett, Guitar Player in Band, Morley Safer
- Men in Black: The Series - Himself
- My Life as a Teenage Robot - Captain, Critter #3, Patrolman #1
- Once and Again - Tom
- Race to Space - Air Policeman
- Random Acts of Comedy - Himself
- Sabrina, The Teenage Witch - Brady
- Saturday Night Live - (2 episodes)
- Sisters - Photographer
- Son of the Beach - FBI Agent
- Step by Step - Trainer
- Suddenly Susan - Mike
- That's So Raven - Aldo
- The Arsenio Hall Show - (38 episodes)
- The Batman - Detective
- The Drew Carey Show - Karaoke DJ, Harry the Tuba
- The Jay Leno Show
- The Secret World of Tyler Mack - Chester, Janitor
- The Tonight Show with Jay Leno - Cowboy Bob, Wick Tompkins, Ronnie Fisk, Host of 'Elderly Say the Darnest Things', Jim Wise - NBC Vice President of Promotional Relations, Yorick Wise, Larry the Quaker, Audience Corrdinator, Santa Claus, Bieber Baby, Middle-Aged Harry Potter, Doctor
- The Zeta Project - Dr. Byrne
- Veronica's Closet - Steve, Heckler
- Wizards of Waverly Place - Mr. Malone
- Zoe, Duncan, Jack & Jane - Matt

=== TV specials ===
- 2014 MTV Video Music Awards - (creative consultant)

=== Film ===
- A Bucket of Blood - Guitar Player, Singer
- A Night at the Roxbury - New Club Waiter
- Batman: The Dark Knight Returns - Part 1 - Femur
- Bloodfist IV: Die Trying - Pizza Cop
- Body Waves - Dooner
- Casper Meets Wendy - Hungry Fan
- Chicks - Marcus the Blind Masseur
- Clockwatchers - Man in Bar
- Danny Roane: First Time Director - Animal Wrangler
- Green Lantern: First Flight - Lieutenant
- Guys Choice Awards 2015
- Guys Choice Awards 2016
- Hollywood Chaos - Waterfront Café Manager
- Hoovey - Basketball Announcer
- Hostile Intentions - Boyfriend
- Hotel Transylvania - Shrunken Head, Hydra
- Hotel Transylvania 2 - Additional voices
- Love Liza - Bland Man
- Michael Jordan: An American Hero - Reporter
- Nickelodeon Kids' Choice Awards 2016 - (creative consultant)
- Not Another Teen Movie - Football Announcer
- Pitbull's New Year's Revolution
- Race to Space - Air Policeman
- Revenge of the Red Baron - Lead Medic
- Scooby-Doo! Music of the Vampire - Henry/Fred Jones (singing voice)
- Showgirls - Loudmouth at Cheetah
- Soup of the Day - Dave
- Space Jam - Police Assistant (uncredited)
- Talladega Nights: The Ballad of Ricky Bobby - Jim Bohampton
- The Enigma with a Stigma - Jack Durham
- The Even Stevens Movie - Coach Tugnut
- The Guys
- The SpongeBob SquarePants Movie - SpongeBob's Singing Voice (uncredited)
- TV Land Icon Awards 2016 - (written by)

=== Shorts ===
- The Amazing Adventures of Spider-Man - Electro

=== Video games ===
- Escape from Monkey Island - Manatee Operator, Starbuccaneer's Clerk
- EverQuest II - Additional voices
- The SpongeBob SquarePants Movie - Additional voices
- Tony Hawk's Pro Skater 3 - Additional voices
- X-Men: Next Dimension - Additional voices
