= Brandon Baker =

American actor (born 1984)

- Born: April 28, 1984 (age 42); Anaheim, California, U.S.
- Education: University of California, Santa Barbara
- Occupation: Actor
- Years active: 1998–2015

Brandon Baker (born April 28, 1984) is an American retired actor. He is known for the television films, such as the Disney Channel film Johnny Tsunami, alongside Kirsten Storms and Lee Thompson Young, and its sequel Johnny Kapahala: Back on Board, as well as for his role as Cray Blake on the NBC sitcom One World. He also appeared in four episodes of the Disney Channel series Even Stevens and voiced Duke Anoi in eight episodes of the animated series The Proud Family.

== Early life and education ==
Baker was born on April 28, 1984, in Anaheim, California, the oldest of three children. He is of English, German and Filipino descent. He attended the University of California, Santa Barbara.

== Acting career ==
In 1998, Baker landed his first big break with the starring role of Mowgli in Walt Disney's Jungle Book: Mowgli's Story. He also starred alongside Jessica Alba in the 1999 film P.U.N.K.S. Baker was invited to the 2007 Disney Channel Games after Zac Efron dropped out.

After a six-year hiatus, Baker starred in the 2014 comedy The Formula alongside Reginald VelJohnson and Sasha Jackson. Baker made a brief return to the spotlight in 2019 when he guest starred on Christy's Kitchen Throwbacks, a web channel hosted by fellow former Disney Channel actor Christy Carlson Romano.

== Post-acting career ==
In 2015, Baker lost his passion for acting and retired from the industry. He moved to Boulder, Colorado in 2017. In 2019, he became a wedding officiant at wedding planning company Simply Eloped. Baker is also a member of the band The Cheeks.

== Filmography ==
=== Film ===
Year	Title	Role	Notes
1998	The Jungle Book: Mowgli's Story	Mowgli	
1999	P.U.N.K.S.	Jonny Pasiotopolis	
2000	Wind River	Pantsuk	
2014	The Formula	Quinn	
2015	Up on the Wooftop	Accountant	

=== Television ===
Year	Title	Role	Notes
1998	Cousin Skeeter	Noodles	Episode: "Tyrannosaurus Wrecked"
1998	City Guys	Ernesto	Episode: "Big Brothers"
1998–2001	One World	Cray Blake	3 seasons
1999	Johnny Tsunami	Johnny Kapahala	TV movie
2000–2003	Even Stevens	Zack Estrada	4 episodes
2001	Boston Public	Danny Miller	Episode: "Chapter Nine"
2001	Go Fish	Sumir	Episode: "Go Wrestling"
2003–2005	The Proud Family	Duke Anoi (voice)	8 episodes
2005	Campus Confidential	Mohktar	TV movie
2007	The Unit	Teenage Boy	Episode: "In Loco Parentis"
2007	Johnny Kapahala: Back on Board	Johnny Kapahala	TV movie
2013	Instacurity	Various	2 episodes

=== Web series ===
Year	Title	Role	Notes
2019	Christy's Kitchen Throwback	Self	Episode: "Johnny Tsunami & Kim Possible Mele Kalikimaka Fried Rice!"
