= Sebaldt =

Sebaldt is a surname. Notable people with the surname include:

- Christian Sebaldt (born 1958), German cinematographer
- Maria Sebaldt (1930–2023), German actress
