= Zachary Bostrom =

American actor

- Born: Los Angeles, California, United States
- Other name: Zach Bostrom
- Years active: 1986–present

Zachary Bostrom, also credited as Zach Bostrom, is an American actor. As a child actor, he was best known for his role as Ernie Henderson in the sitcom Harry and the Hendersons and Kevin Brady in the 1988 TV Movie A Very Brady Christmas. In 1999, he portrayed Brett, the title character's nemesis, in the popular made-for-TV Disney movie Johnny Tsunami. In 2014, he appeared in two episodes of the sci-fi TV mini-series, Necrolectric.

== Filmography ==
=== Film ===
Year	Title	Role	Notes
1995	Unstrung Heroes	Additional voices	
2000	Dinosaur	Additional voices	
2001	Power Rangers Time Force: Photo Finish	Mitch	
2003	7 Songs	Student Assistant	

=== Television ===
Year	Title	Role	Notes
1986	Fame	Timmy	Episode: "All I Want for Christmas"
1987	The Twilight Zone	Matthew Wolfe	Episode: "The Card/The Junction"
1987	Dennis the Menace	Peewee	Television film
1987	Knots Landing	Waiter	Episode: "Weak Moment"
1988	The Secret Life of Kathy McCormick	Young Boy	Television film
1988	ABC Afterschool Special	Teddy	Episode: "Tattle: When to Tell on a Friend"
1988	A Very Brady Christmas	Kevin Brady	Television film
1989	It's Garry Shandling's Show	Marshall Coleman	2 episodes
1989	Full House	Jimmy	2 episodes
1990	Who's the Boss?	Kevin	Episode: "Take Me Back to the Ballgame"
1990	Parker Lewis Can't Lose	Bobby	Episode: "Pilot"
1991–1993	Harry and the Hendersons	Ernie Henderson	72 episodes
1994	Armed and Innocent	Davey	Television film
1994	Aliens for Breakfast	Dorf	Television film
1997	Home Improvement	Chad	Episode: "The Karate Kid Returns"
1999	Johnny Tsunami	Brett	Television film
1999	Beverly Hills, 90210	Henry Regan	Episode: "Family Tree"
2001	Power Rangers Time Force	Mitch	Episode: "Full Exposure"
2001	So Little Time	Ryan	Episode: "Tedi's Burnout"
2002	Night of the Wolf	Jesse McNichol	Television film
2005	JAG	Recruit Walter Evans	Episode: "Fair Winds and Following Seas"
2006	Will & Grace	Josh	Episode: "Cop to It"
2006	CSI: Crime Scene Investigation	Young Frank	Episode: "Double Cross"
2006	Close to Home	Paul Harris	Episode: "There's Something About Martha"
2014	The Young and the Restless		Episode #1.10543
2014	Necrolectric	Cas	2 episodes
2015	Scream Queens	Upperclassman #2	Episode: "Pilot"
2015	Code Black	Killian Wahler	Episode: "You Are the Heart"
2017	Training Day	Stephen	Episode: "Trigger Time"
2018	Timeless	Dennis Langford	Episode: "The Miracle of Christmas Part I/II"
2023	The Other Black Girl	Young Richard Wagner	Episode: "I Know a Place"
