= Heavy Metal (Terminator: The Sarah Connor Chronicles) =

- Terminator: The Sarah Connor Chronicles episode
- Episode no.: Season 1 Episode 4
- Directed by: Sergio Mimica-Gezzan
- Written by: John Enbom
- Cinematography by: Bill Roe
- Original air date: February 4, 2008

Guest appearances
- Brian Bloom as Carter; Lee Thompson Young as Agent Stewart

Episode chronology
← Previous "The Turk"	Next → "Queen's Gambit"

"Heavy Metal" is the fourth episode of the American television series Terminator: The Sarah Connor Chronicles. Written by John Enbom, the episode aired on Fox on February 4, 2008, and features the discovery and stymieing of another Terminator and its preparatory mission to artificially bolster Skynet's future war resources, as well as Cromartie's realization of his new human disguise.

== Plot ==
Written by John Enbom, the plot of "Heavy Metal" consists of two non-intersecting storylines.

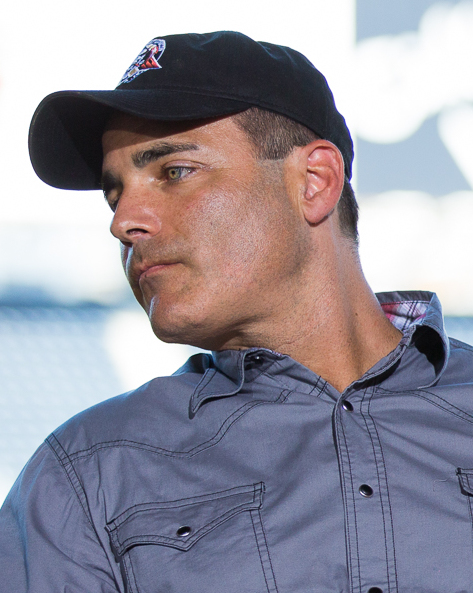
Brian Bloom (2016) guest-starred as a Terminator that is hoarding coltan.

Suspicious of a redirected shipment of refined coltan, Cameron, Sarah, and John discover another Terminator (Brian Bloom) hoarding the metal—an essential component of Terminator construction—in preparation for its use in the future war. Dealing with this new threat focuses on John and Sarah's differing tactics; whereas Sarah is more concerned with John's safety and decides they should ignore this new development, John feels that despite the lack of any apparent threat to himself, they have a responsibility to deal with this new Terminator. John ultimately defies his mother and follows the Terminator to a military bunker where it stores the coltan, seals itself (and John) in, and goes into a "standby mode". Sarah and Cameron successfully retrieve John and the coltan, sealing the Terminator inside. After driving the truck with the coltan into the ocean, it's revealed that Cameron kept a bar of the metal without the others' knowledge.

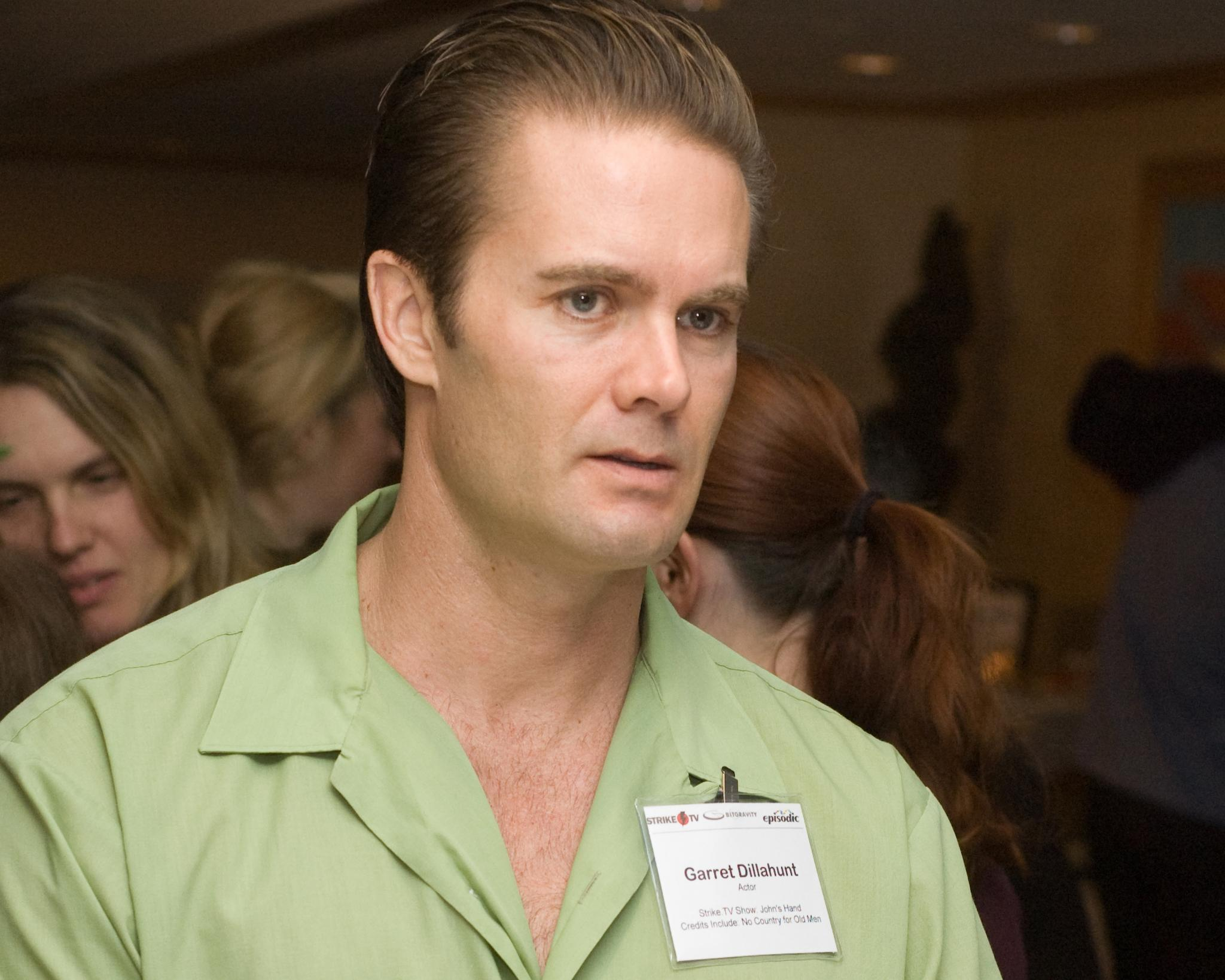
"Heavy Metal" introduced Garret Dillahunt as the late George Laszlo and the new face of Cromartie.

On a Friday evening, Cromartie forces Dr. Lyman, a plastic surgeon, to sculpt his face into the same as another patient the doctor had already treated—unemployed actor, George Laszlo (Garret Dillahunt); after receiving his surgery Cromartie kills the doctor and leaves. The recurring Agent Ellison arrives on the murder scene as it's tied to his previous cases by Cromartie's mysterious faux blood. Investigating the real Mr. Laszlo, his blood does not match that at the scenes, and he is released by the FBI only to be killed and replaced by the doppelgänger Cromartie.

== Production ==
Travis Fickett of IGN opined that series creator Josh Friedman had apparently devoted a lot of time to imagining the technical aspects of Terminators when this episode touched on such questions as "If [a Terminator] were badly damaged and lost their skin […] how would they continue their mission?" and "If a terminator completed its mission, would it just go into standby?" Fickett also explicitly extolled the special effects in "Heavy Metal", especially as spectacle has been a hallmark of the Terminator films.

"Heavy Metal" was included in the first season set of Terminator: The Sarah Connor Chronicles, released on both DVD and Blu-ray Disc by Warner Home Video on August 19, 2008.

== Reception ==
The episode aired on February 4, 2008. As of July 2009, members of the user-contributed television review sites TV.com and the IMDb rated "Heavy Metal" a 9.0 (rated "Superb") and 7.7 out of 10 respectively. According to Nielson research for the week of February 4–10, "Heavy Metal" was the twenty-sixth most watched program on American television.

Brad Trechak, blogger for TV Squad, felt that despite John Connor's character development consisting of "showing his teenage angst by going totally emo" the episode was an improvement over the previous episode—"The Turk". In contrast, Steven Kotler of Hollywood.com wrote in the New York Post that "Heavy Metal" allowed John to evolve into more of a hero archetype by "learning to get his Rambo on, [... and] putting aside all that 'why can't I be a normal teenager'" angst.
