= Cary-Hiroyuki Tagawa =

Japanese actor (1950–2025)

- 田川 洋行
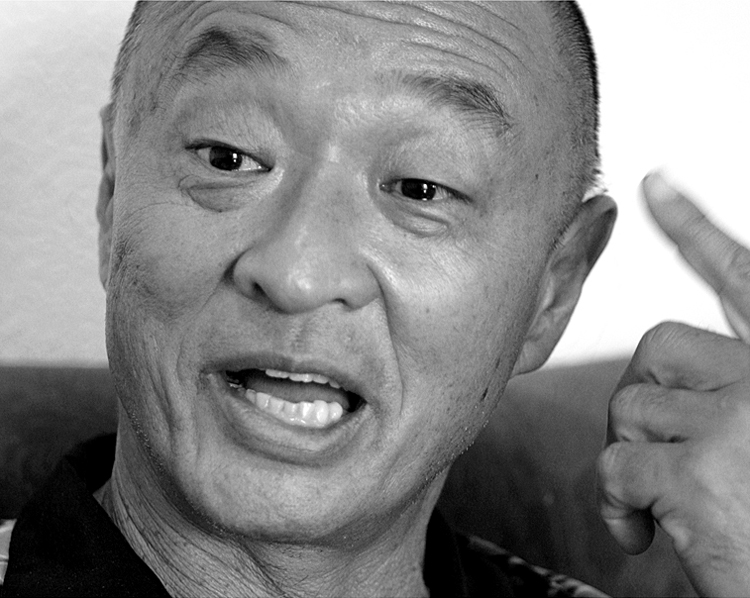
- Tagawa in 2011
- Born: 27 September 1950; Higashi-Azabu, Tokyo, Japan
- Died: 4 December 2025 (aged 75); Santa Barbara, California, U.S.
- Other names: Cary Tagawa; Panteleimon
- Citizenship: Japan (expatriate); United States; Russia
- Education: University of Southern California
- Occupations: Actor; martial artist; film producer
- Years active: 1986–2024
- Spouse: Sally Phillips Petersen (m. 1984; div. 2014)
- Children: 3

Cary-Hiroyuki Tagawa (Japanese: 田川 洋行, romanized: Tagawa Hiroyuki; 27 September 1950 – 4 December 2025) was a Japanese-American actor and film producer who was best known for his role as the evil shapeshifter sorcerer Shang Tsung in various works of the Mortal Kombat franchise: he first played the character in the 1995 film adaptation, and reprised it in 2013 for the television series Mortal Kombat: Legacy and in 2019 for the video game Mortal Kombat 11. He appeared as Lt. A.J. Shimamura on 15 episodes of the American television series Nash Bridges.

Often cast as villains, he became known for his film roles in: The Last Emperor (1987), the James Bond film Licence to Kill (1989), Showdown in Little Tokyo (1991), American Me (1992), Rising Sun (1993), Mortal Kombat (1995), The Phantom (1996), Snow Falling on Cedars (1999), Pearl Harbor (2001), Planet of the Apes (also 2001), Memoirs of a Geisha (2005), Tekken (2009), 47 Ronin (2013), Tekken 2: Kazuya's Revenge (2014), and Kubo and the Two Strings (2016). He starred as Trade Minister Nobusuke Tagomi on the Amazon Prime television series The Man in the High Castle (2015–2018), and Hiroki Watanabe on the Netflix series Lost in Space (2018–2021).

== Life and career ==
=== Early years and education ===
Tagawa was born in Tokyo, Japan, the son of Japanese Takarazuka actress Mariko Hata and a Japanese-American father who served in the United States Army and was stationed at Fort Bragg, North Carolina, Fort Polk, Louisiana, and Fort Hood, Texas. His mother languages were English and Japanese, but he also spoke some Russian, Korean and Spanish.

As an army brat, Tagawa was raised in various cities. His family finally settled in Southern California, where he began acting while attending Duarte High School. He attended the University of Southern California and was an exchange student in Japan. He studied kendo and Shotokan karate under Masatoshi Nakayama at the Japan Karate Association.

=== Acting career ===
His breakthrough as an actor came when he was cast as the Eunuch Chang in The Last Emperor (1987). In 1989, he played an undercover agent of the Hong Kong Narcotics Board in the James Bond film Licence to Kill. In 1991, he starred alongside Dolph Lundgren and Brandon Lee in the action film Showdown in Little Tokyo, where he played the role of yakuza boss Yoshida. He also starred alongside James Hong, Mako Iwamatsu and Jeff Speakman in the same year in the film The Perfect Weapon, where he played Kai, an assistant to the Korean mafia families.

In 1993, he starred as the wayward scion of a Japanese industrialist in Rising Sun. He appeared in the film Mortal Kombat (1995) as the sorcerer Shang Tsung; he reprised the role in the web series Mortal Kombat: Legacy in 2013, and in the video game Mortal Kombat 11 in 2019. He also appeared as the pirate leader Kabai Sengh in The Phantom (1996). Tagawa is among the actors, producers and directors interviewed in the documentary The Slanted Screen (2006), directed by Jeff Adachi, about the representation of Asian and Asian-American men in Hollywood.

Tagawa played Heihachi Mishima in Tekken, the film adaptation of the video game franchise. In 2006, he provided the voice of Brushogun in Teen Titans: Trouble in Tokyo. He was in the film Johnny Tsunami (1999) and its sequel Johnny Kapahala: Back on Board (2007). In between those two films, Tagawa played Attar's mentor Krull in Tim Burton's version of Planet of the Apes (2001).

He played Satoshi Takeda in Revenge, a powerful CEO in Japan and Emily Thorne's former mentor in her quest for revenge. In season 2, Tagawa took over the role from Hiroyuki Sanada, who was unable to continue due to scheduling conflicts.

Tagawa also played the role of Shogun Tokugawa Tsunayoshi in the 2013 film 47 Ronin.

In 2015, Tagawa was cast as one of the lead characters, Nobusuke Tagomi, the Trade Minister of the Pacific States of America in Amazon's The Man in the High Castle based on Philip K. Dick's novel of the same name. Also in November 2015, both he and Taimak (The Last Dragon) were honorees for the Fists of Legends Legacy Award at the Urban Action Showcase & Expo.

== Personal life and death ==
In 2015, Tagawa converted to Eastern Orthodoxy, and in 2016, he acquired Russian citizenship after playing an Orthodox priest in the Russian-Japanese film, Priest-San (or The Samurai Confessions).

On 4 December 2025, Tagawa died at age 75 from complications of a stroke at his home in Santa Barbara, California.

== Filmography ==
=== Film ===
Year	Title	Role	Notes
1986	Big Trouble in Little China	Wing Kong Swordsman	Uncredited
1986	Armed Response	Toshi	
1987	The Last Emperor	Chang	
1988	Bulletproof	Thug in flashback	Uncredited
1988	Spellbinder	Lieutenant Lee	
1988	Twins	Oriental Man	
1989	The Last Warrior	Imperial Marine	
1989	Licence to Kill	Kwang	
1991	Kickboxer 2	Sanga	
1991	Showdown in Little Tokyo	Funekei Yoshida	
1991	The Perfect Weapon	Kai	
1992	Nemesis	Angie-Liv	
1992	American Me	'El Japo'	
1993	Rising Sun	Eddie Sakamura	
1994	Natural Causes	Major Somchal	
1994	Picture Bride	Kanzuki	
1995	The Dangerous	Kon	
1995	Mortal Kombat	Shang Tsung	
1995	Soldier Boyz	Vinh Moc	
1996	White Tiger	Victor Chow	
1996	The Phantom	The Great Kabai Sengh	
1996	Danger Zone	Monsieur Chang	
1997	Top of the World	Captain Hefter	
1997	Provocateur	Captain Jong	
1997	Mortal Kombat Annihilation	Shang Tsung	Archive footage
1998	Vampires	David Deyo	
1998	American Dragons	Matsuyama	
1999	Bridge of Dragons	General Ruechang	
1999	Fixations	Alex	
1999	Snow Falling on Cedars	Zenhichi Miyamoto	
2000	The Art of War	David Chan	
2001	Pearl Harbor	Commander Minoru Genda	
2001	Planet of the Apes	Krull	
2005	Elektra	Master Roshi	
2005	Memoirs of a Geisha	The Baron	
2006	The Slanted Screen	Himself	Documentary
2007	Balls of Fury	Mysterious Asian Man	
2007	Blizhniy Boy: The Ultimate Fighter	Alibek	
2008	Lost Warrior: Left Behind	Detective Yoshide	Direct-to-video
2008	Bodyguard: A New Beginning	Kai	
2009	By the Will of Chingis Khan	Bodyguard	
2009	Hachi: A Dog's Tale	Ken	
2009	Tekken	Heihachi Mishima	
2009	The Tomb	Len Burris	
2012	Black Cobra	Goro Tanaka	Direct-to-video
2013	Duel of Legends	Shing	Also producer
2013	47 Ronin	Tokugawa Tsunayoshi	
2014	Hype Nation 3D	Sammy Kata	
2014	Priest-San	Father Nikolai 'Takuro' Nakamura	
2014	Ninja Apocalypse	Fumitaka	Direct-to-video
2014	Tekken 2: Kazuya's Revenge	Heihachi Mishima	Direct-to-video
2014	Skin Trade	Senator Khat	
2015	Junction	Narrator	Voice
2015	Diamond Cartel	Khazar	
2015	The Man with the Iron Fists 2	The Mayor	Direct-to-video
2015	Little Boy	Hashimoto	
2016	Showdown in Manila	Aldric Cole	
2016	Beyond the Game	Detective Yoshida	
2016	Kubo and the Two Strings	Hashi	Voice
2019	Looking in the Mirror	Henry	
2019	Girl Games	Iwata	
2020	Sky Sharks	Michael Morel	

==== Short films ====
Year	Title	Role	Notes
2005	True Love & Mimosa Tea	Andreas Kanaka	
2005	The Sand Island Drive-In Anthem	Uncle C	
2009	The Legend of Chang Apana	Chang Apana	Also producer
2010	Absolute.ness	Chief Dax	
2010	Overturned	Judge	
2015	Genghis Khan Conquers the Moon	Genghis Khan	
2016	Overwatch: Dragons	Narrator / Sojiro Shimada	Voice

=== Television ===
Year	Title	Role	Notes
1987	MacGyver	Asian Buyer	Episode: "Dalton, Jack of Spies"
1987	The Colbys	Mr. Sung	Episode: "Devil's Advocate"
1987	Star Trek: The Next Generation	Mandarin bailiff	Episode: "Encounter at Farpoint"
1987–1989	Miami Vice	Kenji Fujitsu / Tegoro	2 episodes
1988	Hotel	Inspector Chin	Episode: "Double Take"
1989	L.A. Takedown	Hugh Denny	Television film
1989	Superboy	Detective Jed Slade	Episode: "Terror from the Blue"
1989	Knots Landing	Mr. Toyo	Episode: "Giganticus II: The Revenge"
1989	Moonlighting	Artist	Episode: "Perfect"
1989	Peaceable Kingdom	Coach	Episode: "Chimp"
1989	Alien Nation	Yamato	Episode: "The First Cigar"
1989	Mission: Impossible	Vang Kai	Episode: "Countdown"
1990	Jake and the Fatman	Raymond Char	Episode: "Chinatown, My Chinatown"
1990	Hardball		Episode: "Wedding Bell Blues"
1990	The Bakery	Kim Lee	Television film
1990	Vestige of Honor	Thai Major	Television film
1991	Baywatch	Mason Sato	Episode: "War of Nerves"
1991	Not of This World	Shikido	Television film
1991	Mission of the Shark: The Saga of the U.S.S. Indianapolis	Shoji Hashimoto	Television film
1992	Raven	Osato	2 episodes
1993	Renegade	Hirotaka	Episode: "Samurai"
1993–1994	Space Rangers	Zylyn	6 episodes
1994	Day of Reckoning	Prakit	Television film
1995	Babylon 5	Morishi	Episode: "Convictions"
1995	Thunder in Paradise 3	Mason Lee	Television film
1996	Cybill	Kenji	Episode: "Cybill and Maryann Go to Japan"
1996	Sabrina the Teenage Witch	Tai Wei Tse	Episode: "Sweet & Sour Victory"
1996–1997	Nash Bridges	Lieutenant A.J. Shimamura	15 episodes
1997	Happily Ever After: Fairy Tales for Every Child	King Young-Jin	Voice; episode: "The Little Mermaid"
1997	Raven: Return of the Black Dragon	Osato	Television film
1997	Stargate SG-1	Turghan	Episode: "Emancipation"
1998	Poltergeist: The Legacy	Sam Tanaka	Episode: "The Internment"
1998	Vengeance Unlimited	Aung Myint	Episode: "Ambition"
1999	Seven Days	Peter	Episode: "Walter"
1999	Johnny Tsunami	Johnny Tsunami	Television film
1999	NetForce	Leong Cheng	Television film
2000	Walker, Texas Ranger	Master Ko	Episode: "Black Dragons"
2003	Baywatch: Hawaiian Wedding	Mason Sato	Television film
2004	Hawaii	Captain Terry Harada	
2005	Faith of My Fathers	Cat	Television film
2006	Teen Titans: Trouble in Tokyo	Brushogun	Voice; television film
2007	Heroes	The Swordsmith	2 episodes
2007	Johnny Kapahala: Back on Board	Johnny Tsunami	Television film
2008	Ghost Voyage	The Steward	Television film
2009	Beyond the Break	Xander	2 episodes
2010	Hawaii Five-0	Hiro Noshimori	2 episodes
2012–2013	Revenge	Satoshi Takeda	6 episodes
2014	Teen Wolf	Katashi / Silverfinger	Episode: "Silverfinger"
2014	The Librarians	Mr. Drake	Episode: "And the Apple of Discord"
2015–2018	The Man in the High Castle	Nobusuke Tagomi	Main cast
2016	Grimm	Takeshi Himura	Episode: "Inugami"
2016	Teenage Mutant Ninja Turtles	Sumo Kuma	Voice; 2 episodes
2017	Star Wars Rebels	Alrich Wren	Voice; 2 episodes
2018	Lost in Space	Hiroki Watanabe	5 episodes
2019	A Lover Scorned	Wong	Television film
2020	DuckTales	Akita	Voice; episode: "Astro B.O.Y.D.!"
2021	Star Wars: Visions	Valco	Voice; episode: "The Village Bride"; English language dub
2021	NCIS: Los Angeles	Craig Tanaka	Episode: "Fukushu"
2023	Blue Eye Samurai	Master Eiji	Voice

=== Web ===
Year	Title	Role	Notes
2013	Mortal Kombat: Legacy	Shang Tsung	2 episodes

=== Video games ===
Year	Title	Role	Notes
1997	Soldier Boyz	Vinh Moc	
2003	Batman: Rise of Sin Tzu	Sin Tzu	
2016	World of Warcraft: Legion	Voice over cast	
2019–2020	Mortal Kombat 11	Shang Tsung	Voice and physical likeness; appears as downloadable content
2023	Mortal Kombat: Onslaught	Shang Tsung	Physical likeness

== Bibliography ==
- Paul, Louis (2008). "Cary-Hiroyuki Tagawa". Tales from the Cult Film Trenches: Interviews with 36 Actors from Horror, Science Fiction and Exploitation Cinema. Detroit: Wayne State University Press. pp. 254–261. ISBN 978-0-7864-2994-3.
