= Lee Thompson Young =

American actor (1984–2013)

- Young in "Heavy Metal" (Terminator: The Sarah Connor Chronicles; 2008)
- Born: February 1, 1984; Columbia, South Carolina, U.S.
- Died: August 19, 2013 (aged 29); Los Angeles, California, U.S.
- Resting place: Lakeview Memorial Gardens, York, South Carolina
- Education: University of Southern California
- Occupation: Actor
- Years active: 1998–2013

Lee Thompson Young (February 1, 1984 – August 19, 2013) was an American actor who began his career as a teenager, playing the titular character on the Disney Channel television series The Famous Jett Jackson (1998–2001). As an adult, major roles included playing Chris Comer in the movie Friday Night Lights (2004) and Boston police detective Barry Frost on the TNT police drama series Rizzoli & Isles (2010–14).

== Early life ==
Young, who was of African American heritage, was born in Columbia, South Carolina, the son of Velma Elaine (née Love) and Tommy Scott Young. He was in the second grade when his parents' marriage ended, and he went to live with his mother. At age ten, he portrayed Martin Luther King Jr. in a play called A Night of Stars and Dreams by Dwight Woods at the Phillis Wheatley Repertory Theater of Greenville, South Carolina. It was then that Young decided he wanted to become an actor.

== Career ==
Young moved to New York City in June 1996, but it was not until the next year that he auditioned for the part of Jett Jackson in The Famous Jett Jackson. He filmed the pilot and found out in June 1998 that the Disney Channel had picked up the show; it would go on to become a Disney Channel Original Movie in June 2001. Young also starred in Johnny Tsunami (1999), another Disney Channel Original Movie, as Sam Sterling. Although the movie was successful, he did not reprise the role in the sequel, Johnny Kapahala: Back on Board (2007), which was taken over by Jonathan McDaniel.

In 2002, one year after the cancellation of The Famous Jett Jackson, Young had guest spots in the CBS series The Guardian. He also had a part in the movie Friday Night Lights (2004), portraying Chris Comer. He then portrayed Charles Becnel in the Jamie Foxx movie Redemption: The Stan Tookie Williams Story (also 2004). Lee appeared on UPN's TV drama series South Beach, and he portrayed Victor Stone (known in DC Comics as Cyborg) in a fifth-season episode of the television series Smallville, in 2006; he reprised the character in the Season Six episode "Justice" (airdate January 18, 2007), and in the Season Nine finale "Salvation" (airdate May 14, 2010).

Young appeared in the feature film Akeelah and the Bee (2006), playing Akeelah's brother Devon. He played National Guard rookie Delmar in The Hills Have Eyes 2 (2007). In 2009, Young played a cocky surgical intern in the hit comedy show Scrubs. It is revealed that his character had been overweight during childhood. The character becomes involved in a romance with one of the medical interns.

Young played the role of Al Gough, an FBI agent, in the ABC television drama FlashForward. He was written off the show in episode 7, when his character committed suicide to prevent the death of an innocent civilian.

He made an appearance on the Fox drama The Good Guys as the brother and business partner of an arms dealer. His last acting role was playing Barry Frost, partner of Jane Rizzoli (Angie Harmon) on the TNT drama Rizzoli & Isles.

== Death ==
On August 19, 2013, Young did not show up to film an episode of Rizzoli & Isles. Police were called to do a wellbeing check on him at his Los Angeles apartment, where he was found dead. His manager stated that the 29-year-old actor had died by suicide. Police confirmed the cause of death as a self-inflicted gunshot wound. Young had been diagnosed with bipolar disorder, for which he had been taking medication, and had been suffering from depression before his death.

After funeral services at Inglewood Park Cemetery, Young was interred at Lakeview Memory Gardens in York, South Carolina. A memorial service was held on the Paramount Studios lot.

Young's family later launched the Lee Thompson Young Foundation in an effort to help remove the stigma surrounding mental illness.

== Filmography ==
Film
Year	Title	Role	Notes
2004	Friday Night Lights	Chris Comer	
2006	Akeelah and the Bee	Devon Anderson	
2007	The Hills Have Eyes 2	Delmar	
2007	Mano	Machito	Short film
2010	Bastard	Passenger 1	Short film
2012	Just an American	Curtiss Jackson	

Television
Year	Title	Role	Notes
1998–2001	The Famous Jett Jackson	Jett Jackson / Silverstone	Lead role (65 episodes)
1999	Johnny Tsunami	Sam Sterling	TV Movie
2001	Jett Jackson: The Movie	Jett Jackson / Silverstone	TV Movie
2002	Philly	Steven Hicks	Episode: "There's No Business Like No Business"
2002	The Guardian	Levi Mooney	5 episodes
2003	Jake 2.0	Prince Malik Namir	Episode: "The Prince and the Revolution"
2003	The Jersey	Himself	Episode: "Origins: Part 2"
2004	Redemption: The Stan Tookie Williams Story	Charles Becnel	TV Movie
2004	The Proud Family	Teen Bebe (voice)	Episode: "Twins to Tweens"
2004–2005	Xiaolin Showdown	Jermaine (voice)	2 episodes
2005	Kevin Hill	Levi	Episode: "Homeland Insecurity"
2006	South Beach	Alex Bauer	5 episodes
2006–2007; 2010	Smallville	Victor Stone/Cyborg	3 episodes
2008	Five Year Plan	Mutabi	TV Movie
2008	Terminator: The Sarah Connor Chronicles	Agent Stewart	Episode: "Heavy Metal"
2009	Scrubs	Dr. Derek Hill	3 episodes
2009	Lincoln Heights	Julian	Episode: "Bully for You"
2009–2010	FlashForward	Al Gough	8 episodes
2010	The Good Guys	Eric Williams	Episode: "Small Rooms"
2010	The Event	Corporal Bell	2 episodes
2010–2014	Rizzoli & Isles	Det. Barry Frost	Main role (56 episodes)
2012	CSI: NY	Kelvin Moore	Episode: "Unwrapped"

== Accolades ==
Year	Association	Category	Nominated work	Result
1999	Young Artist Awards	Best Performance in a TV Drama or Comedy Series – Leading Young Actor	The Famous Jett Jackson	Nominated
2000	Young Artist Awards	Best Performance in a TV Comedy Series – Leading Young Actor	The Famous Jett Jackson	Nominated
2001	Young Artist Awards	Best Performance in a TV Drama Series – Leading Young Actor	The Famous Jett Jackson	Nominated
2001	Gemini Awards	Best Performance in a Children's or Youth Program or Series	The Famous Jett Jackson	Nominated
