= The Famous Jett Jackson =

Television series

- Genre: Action adventure Comedy drama
- Created by: Fracaswell Hyman
- Starring: Lee Thompson Young; Ryan Sommers Baum; Kerry Duff; Gordon Greene; Montrose Hagins; Melanie Nicholls-King
- Composer: Carlos Lopes
- Countries of origin: United States; Canada
- Original language: English
- No. of seasons: 3
- No. of episodes: 65 (list of episodes)

Production
- Executive producers: Shawn Levy; Jim Steyer
- Producer: Kevin May
- Cinematography: Yuri Yakubiw
- Running time: 22 minutes
- Production companies: Alliance Atlantis; Everyone Is JP Kids; TV-Loonland AG (Season 3)

Original release
- Network: Disney Channel
- Release: October 25, 1998 – June 22, 2001

The Famous Jett Jackson is a coming-of-age television series for the Disney Channel; airing from October 25, 1998, to June 22, 2001. The show is about a boy named Jett Jackson (Lee Thompson Young) who plays a teenage secret agent on a fictional show-within-a-show called Silverstone.

== Premise ==
Jett Jackson previously lived with his actress mother in Los Angeles, but missed his home and his friends. Longing for a relatively normal life, Jett succeeds in getting the production of Silverstone moved to the fictional city of Wilsted, North Carolina, thus providing jobs to townspeople while affording Jett the chance to live with his father, Sheriff Woodrick "Wood" Jackson, and his great-grandmother, Miz Coretta (whom Jett calls Nana). Keeping in touch with his mother Jules by video link on his computer (though by the third season she also moved to Wilsted), Jett now spends part of his time with family, friends and school, and the rest living the life of a working actor and celebrity. In doing so, Jett often ends up in sticky situations, usually aided and abetted by his childhood friend, J.B., his not-quite girlfriend Kayla, and sometimes by Cubby, Silverstone's wacky special effects wizard. In the second half of the series, Jett's new co-star, Riley Grant, is added to the mix.

The show within the show, Silverstone, is about a spy who works for Mission Omega Matrix (the acronym being a pun on the word "Mom") in order to save the world from villains like Dr. Hypnoto and The Rat. In contrast to Jett, Silverstone has no family, only his mentor, Artemus, and eventually his partner "Hawk" (surname Hawkins) ("played" by Riley Grant). From the second season onward, the action sequences and Silverstone subplots became more prominent.

The relative realism of Jett's home life sometimes gave way to fantasy or paranormal elements, such as one episode in which Jett learns about a shameful incident in Wilsted's history with a little prodding from the ghost of a key figure in the buried scandal. Other episodes dealt with issues in a more realistic and contemporary way, such as when J.B.'s father's family-owned store is threatened by the arrival of high-powered, "big box" competition, and another in which Jett's English teacher, Mr. Dupree, runs afoul of local attempts at censorship of a class reading assignment. Other episodes dealt with such topics as bulimia and the question of whether Jett, with his relatively sheltered and pampered home life, can truly understand or cope with the problems of other African Americans.

The series was followed by a Disney Channel original movie in which Jett finds himself trapped in Silverstone's world, and vice versa. In that movie, he takes on Silverstone's role for real and is able to muddle through while Silverstone does the same thing in Jett's world until Miz Coretta finds out the truth and he returns home and sends Jett back as well. The movie ends with Jett returning to Silverstone's world and helping him complete his mission by rescuing Silverstone from Kragg and then defeating Kragg alongside his hero alter-ego.

== Episodes ==
Season	Episodes	Originally released	
Season	Episodes	First released	Last released
1	13	October 25, 1998	March 14, 1999
2	26	August 22, 1999	June 3, 2000
3	26	June 17, 2000	June 22, 2001
Film		June 8, 2001	

== Cast ==
=== Main ===
- Lee Thompson Young as Jett Jackson/Silverstone
- Ryan Sommers Baum as J.B. Halliburton
- Kerry Duff as Kayla West
- Gordon Greene as Woodrick Jackson
- Montrose Hagins as Miz Coretta
- Melanie Nicholls-King as Jules Jackson

=== Recurring ===
- Jeffrey Douglas as Cubby
- Lindy Booth as Riley Grant/Hawk
- Nigel Shawn Williams as Nigel Essex/Artemus
- Andrew Tarbet as Deputy Booker Murray
- Robert Bockstael as Mr. Dupree

== History and related series ==
Show creator Fracaswell Hyman reportedly devised the character before casting Lee Thompson Young for the role. Like Jett, Young was raised in a single parent home in the South, and decided on an acting career at an early age. Young went on to write one of the episodes produced for the series.

The series included both young guest stars such as Hayden Christensen, Rachel McAdams, Britney Spears, and Destiny's Child and veteran stars such as Eartha Kitt, the latter of whom played the new coach of Wilsted's minor league baseball team in one episode.

The series ended on June 22, 2001, due to Disney's unstated policy of producing 65 episodes per series.

The show's end theme, "It's Not What You Think", was performed by the band Youngstown in 1999; the full song includes lyrics from Young. The song was used for show credits in seasons 2 and 3.

One of the producers, Jim Steyer of company JP Kids, would go on to found Common Sense Media in 2003.

== Film ==
Jett Jackson: The Movie premiered on Disney Channel on June 8, 2001.

== Syndication ==
After The Famous Jett Jackson ended in 2001, Disney Channel continued to air reruns of the series, although the reruns were gradually relegated to overnight hours before the series was completely removed from the channel's schedule in June 2004. The show briefly aired on ABC Family from December 2003 to January 2004. The show was briefly seen again on Disney XD in 2009.

== Critical reaction ==
Response to the show was generally positive. Laura Fries of Variety, the Hollywood trade paper, noted in her review of Jett Jackson: The Movie that "Young serves as an appealing role model, much like Sarah Michelle Gellar's Buffy the Vampire Slayer --someone who can fulfill young, action craving audiences without the gratuitous violence. There's a sense of empowerment associated with these sort of roles, and handled correctly, they function as an excellent allegory for the confusing teenage years." Although she mentions "contrived plot devices", she also refers to the series as "clever" and "an extremely entertaining concept".

=== Awards and nominations ===
The series The Famous Jett Jackson and its young cast were nominated for Young Artist Awards, presented by the nonprofit Young Artist Foundation, in several categories in the course of the show's run:

Awards
Year	Nomination	Award	Category	Recipient
1999	Nominated	Young Artist Award	Best Performance in a TV Comedy Series, Leading Young Actor	Lee Thompson Young
1999	Nominated	Young Artist Award	Best Performance in a TV Comedy Series, Supporting Young Actor	Ryan Sommers Baum
1999	Won	Young Artist Award	Best Performance in a TV Comedy Series, Supporting Young Actress	Kerry Duff
1999	Nominated	Young Artist Award	Best Family TV Comedy Series	The Famous Jett Jackson
2000	Nominated	Young Artist Award	Best Performance in a TV Drama Series, Leading Young Actor	Lee Thompson Young
2000	Nominated	Young Artist Award	Best Performance in a TV Drama Series, Supporting Young Actor	Ryan Sommers Baum
2000	Nominated	Young Artist Award	Best Performance in a TV Drama Series, Supporting Young Actress	Kerry Duff
2001	Nominated	Young Artist Award	Best Performance in a TV Movie	Kerry Duff (Jett Jackson: The Movie)
2001	Won	Parents' Choice Awards	Silver Honor	The Famous Jett Jackson
