= List of The Famous Jett Jackson episodes =

The following is a list of episodes for the Disney Channel original series The Famous Jett Jackson.

== Series overview ==
Season	Episodes	Originally released	
Season	Episodes	First released	Last released
1	13	October 25, 1998	March 14, 1999
2	26	August 22, 1999	June 3, 2000
3	26	June 17, 2000	June 22, 2001
Film		June 8, 2001	

== Episodes ==
=== Season 1 (1998–99) ===
No. overall	No. in season	Title	Directed by	Written by	Original release date
1	1	"Going Up!"	Shawn Levy	Fracaswell Hyman & Peter Lauer	October 25, 1998
2	2	"Who's the Man"	Roz Owen	Fracaswell Hyman	November 1, 1998
3	3	"Vootle-Muck-a-Heev"	Shawn Levy	Peter Lauer	November 8, 1998
4	4	"Close Encounters"	Shawn Levy	Danielle Gantner	November 15, 1998
5	5	"Hurricane Jules"	Larry McLean	Kate Boutilier	November 22, 1998
6	6	"Switcheroo"	Milan Cheylov	Scott Peters	November 29, 1998
7	7	"Bottom's Up"	Larry McLean	Mark Palmer	January 17, 1999
8	8	"Special FX-ation"	Shawn Levy	Kat Likkel	January 24, 1999
9	9	"Front Page"	Larry McLean	Peter Lauer	January 31, 1999
10	10	"Kiss and Tell"	Gord Langevin	Kim Watson	February 7, 1999
11	11	"The Famous Stone Gold"	Jean-Marie Comeau	Teleplay by : Mark Palmer; Story by : Doug Cooney	February 21, 1999
12	12	"JB's Big Break"	John Bell	Adam Beechen	March 7, 1999
13	13	"Hot Dog"	Otta Hanus	Mark Palmer	March 14, 1999

=== Season 2 (1999–2000) ===
No. overall	No. in season	Title	Directed by	Written by	Original release date
14	1	"Field of Dweebs"	Shawn Levy	Sib Ventress	August 22, 1999
15	2	"Premiere"	Shawn Levy	Mark Palmer	August 29, 1999
16	3	"A Tragedy in Two Parts"	Larry McLean	Rick Gitelson	September 3, 1999
17	4	"Popularity"	Patrick Williams	Tom Devanney	September 10, 1999
18	5	"County Fair"	Shawn Levy	Arthur Sellers	September 17, 1999
19	6	"Things That Fly"	Shawn Levy	Christine Ecklund & Keith Hoffman	September 24, 1999
20	7	"Hawk"	Shawn Levy	John May & Suzanne Bolch	October 1, 1999
21	8	"Ghost Dance"	Larry McLean	Adam Beechen	October 8, 1999
22	9	"Bunk"	Gordon Langevin	Dana Scmalanberg & Patrick Moran	October 15, 1999
23	10	"Par for the Course"	Shawn Levy	David Garber	October 22, 1999
24	11	"Saving Mr. Dupree"	David Warry-Smith	Rick Gitelson	November 5, 1999
25	12	"New York"	Shawn Levy	David Garber	November 12, 1999
26	13	"Spirit"	Shawn Levy	Jeff Schechter	November 19, 1999
27	14	"What Money Can't Buy"	Shawn Levy	Bruce Kalish	December 10, 1999
28	15	"On the Reel"	Shawn Levy	Earl Richey Jones & Todd R. Jones	January 7, 2000
29	16	"Grades"	Shawn Levy	Lawrence H. Levy	January 14, 2000
30	17	"Date"	Shawn Levy	Bruce Kalish	January 21, 2000
31	18	"Behind the Scenes"	Shawn Levy	John May & Suzanne Bolch	January 28, 2000
32	19	"Voices"	Shawn Levy	Sib Ventress	February 11, 2000
33	20	"Spreading Wings"	Shawn Levy	Bruce Kalish & Shawn Levy	February 18, 2000
34	21	"Eye of the Beholder"	Shawn Levy	Al Sonja L. Rice	March 3, 2000
35	22	"Day Trip"	Shawn Levy	Bruce Kalish & Jeff Biederman	March 10, 2000
36	23	"Something to Prove"	Shawn Levy	Lee Thompson Young	April 8, 2000
37	24	"Pride"	Shawn Levy	Bruce Kalish	May 6, 2000
38	25	"Bank Robbery"	Shawn Levy	Sam O'Neal & Neal Boushell	May 27, 2000
39	26	"What You Wish For"	Shawn Levy	Shawn Levy	June 3, 2000

=== Season 3 (2000–01) ===
No. overall	No. in season	Title	Directed by	Written by	Original release date
40	1	"Step Up"	Shawn Levy	David Garber & Bruce Kalish	June 17, 2000
41	2	"Something in the Air"	Shawn Levy	Sib Ventress	June 24, 2000
42	3	"Business as Usual"	Shawn Levy	Jeff Biederman	July 1, 2000
43	4	"Hello, Goodbye"	Shawn Levy	Teleplay by : Shawn Levy; Story by : Shawn Levy & Bruce Kalish	July 8, 2000
44	5	"Great Expectations"	Shawn Levy	Laura Pozmantier	July 15, 2000
45	6	"Age Old Story"	Stacey Stewart Curtis	Austin & Irma Kalish	July 22, 2000
46	7	"Pledge of Allegiance"	Shawn Levy	Naomi Janzen	August 5, 2000
47	8	"Extra Credit"	Shawn Levy	Jeff Biederman	August 12, 2000
48	9	"Heroes"	Shawn Levy	Bruce Kalish	August 19, 2000
49	10	"Detention"	Don McCutcheon	Mark Friedman	September 9, 2000
50	11	"Wheels"	James Marshall	Steve Slavkin	September 16, 2000
51	12	"Beauregard's Beach Bash"	Larry McLean	Bruce Kalish & Shawn Levy	September 23, 2000
52	13	"Truth"	Larry McLean	Hank Saroyan	September 30, 2000
53	14	"Survival of the Fittest"	Shawn Levy	Shawn Levy & Bruce Kalish	October 21, 2000
54	15	"Vote of Confidence"	Stacey Stewart Curtis	Larry Levy	November 3, 2000
55	16	"Backstage Pass"	Shawn Levy	Shawn Levy	December 8, 2000
56	17	"The Perfect Day"	Shawn Levy	Curtis Armstrong & John Doolittle	December 29, 2000
57	18	"Lost and Found"	Shawn Levy	Daryl Nickens	February 2, 2001
58	19	"Food for Thought"	Shawn Levy	Naomi Janzen	March 2, 2001
59	20	"Battle of Wilsted"	Larry McLean	Sam O'Neal & Neal Boushell	March 16, 2001
60	21	"M.O.M."	Tom Willey	Naomi Janzen	May 11, 2001
61	22	"Awakenings: Part 1"	Shawn Levy	Bruce Kalish & Shawn Levy	May 18, 2001
62	23	"Awakenings: Part 2"	Shawn Levy	Bruce Kalish & Shawn Levy	May 25, 2001
63	24	"Hotline"	James Marshall	Teleplay by : Jeff Biederman; Story by : Dewey Gram	June 1, 2001
64	25	"The Game"	James Marshall	Barry Gurstein & David Pitlik	June 17, 2001
65	26	"Holly"	Patrick Williams	Jeff Biederman	June 22, 2001

=== Film (2001) ===
Title	Directed by	Written by	Original release date
Jett Jackson: The Movie	Shawn Levy	Bruce Kalish	June 8, 2001
Jett Jackson (Lee Thompson Young), the young star who plays the title character in the television series Silverstone, considers quitting the show after it is given a three-year extension. His announcement to this effect makes many people angry, because the series provided employment to a significant number of people in his home town, Wilsted, North Carolina. During the filming of what may be the last episode in the series, Jett is accidentally sucked into Silverstone's world when a prop malfunctions. Silverstone is zapped into Jett's world as well. In Silverstone's world, Jett has to save the world from Dr. Kragg's evil plans. Meanwhile, in Wilsted, the orphaned spy Silverstone discovers what it is like to have a relatively normal home and family. He confides in Jett's "Nana", who has already realized that Silverstone is not Jett. Over the course of their respective experiences, Jett and Silverstone each learn to appreciate what they had. Eventually they find a way to switch places again. After learning that Silverstone is destined to die due to his leaving the show, Jett returns to Silverstone's world and saves him from Kragg and together the two defeat the villain. The two discuss Jett's decision before he leaves and Jett realizes that being Silverstone is part of who he is and he can't change that. Upon arriving home, Jett announces that he will continue to appear in the television series.
