= Johnny Tsunami =

1999 TV sports film

- VHS cover
- Written by: Ann Knapp; Douglas Sloan
- Directed by: Steve Boyum
- Starring: Brandon Baker; Yuji Okumoto; Mary Page Keller; Lee Thompson Young; Kirsten Storms; Zachary Bostrom; Gregory Itzin; Steve Van Wormer; Cary-Hiroyuki Tagawa
- Theme music composer: Phil Marshall
- Original language: English

Production
- Producer: Gerald T. Olson
- Cinematography: David Hennings
- Editor: Craig Bassett
- Running time: 88 minutes
- Production company: Film Roman

Original release
- Network: Disney Channel
- Release: July 24, 1999

Related
- Johnny Kapahala: Back on Board

Johnny Tsunami is a 1999 American sports drama film released as a Disney Channel Original Movie (DCOM). The film focuses on a young surfer from Hawaii who must adapt to new challenges when his father's job forces the family to move to Vermont. The film premiered on Disney Channel on July 24, 1999. It was nominated in 2000 for the Humanitas Prize in the Children's Live-Action Category. The film was followed by a sequel, Johnny Kapahala: Back on Board, released in 2007.

== Plot ==
Johnny "Pono" Kapahala II, a thirteen-year-old boy living in Hawaii, is a surfer who has good friends and a happy family, including parents Pete and Melanie, and his paternal grandfather, the famous surf legend Johnny Tsunami. When Pete gets a sudden job transfer, the family is forced to move to Vermont, while Tsunami stays in Hawaii.

In Kapahala's new town, there are two schools: Skyline Academy, a private school where the students are skiers known as Skies; and Maple Valley, a public school where the students are snowboarders known as Urchins. Johnny goes to the skiers' school, but would prefer to snowboard because he thinks it is more like surfing. After some difficulty, Johnny eventually learns how to snowboard with help from a new friend named Sam Sterling.

At his new school, Johnny becomes good friends with a girl named Emily, who is Headmaster Pritchard's daughter. However, a skier named Brett likes Emily too and thinks Johnny is not right for her. The Urchins ride the side of the mountain that belongs to the skiers and are confronted by the Skies. Later, Emily nearly falls off the mountainside while learning how to snowboard with Johnny and his new friends.

A fight ensues between Johnny and Brett regarding the incident, but is immediately dispersed when a snow ranger arrives. After a meeting with his parents and the headmaster concerning the fight with Brett, Sam tells Johnny that he is moving to Iceland, as are his father's orders since he is a first sergeant in the U.S. Marine Corps and relocating also means a promotion to sergeant major. Pete tells Johnny that Sam moving away would be best, as he wants Johnny to fit in with his peers at private school. A fight occurs between Johnny and Pete. Johnny wishes his grandfather were there because he understands him better than Pete; however, Pete feels that Johnny Tsunami – a surf bum – is a bad influence on his son. Johnny and Sam run away from home and fly to Hawaii on a cargo plane to stay with Tsunami. Via telephone, Pete demands the boys be sent home immediately, but Tsunami refuses until they are willing to return. Melanie tells Pete her feelings about him unnecessarily punishing Johnny and tells him he needs to stop forbidding Johnny from his friends and let him snowboard. Pete tries unsuccessfully to defend his actions with Melanie, who reveals that she wishes that he could be the easy-going husband that she once loved, before he became the way he is.

Johnny and Sam enjoy surfing and the warm weather in Hawaii, but they decide to return to Vermont along with Tsunami. Pete is shocked to see his father in Vermont, and the two have a heart-to-heart talk about Pete's punishment in forbidding his son from snowboarding with his friends. Pete admits he went too far in punishing Johnny. Tsunami encourages Pete to go easy on Johnny and let him make his own mistakes so he can learn from them. Tsunami tells Pete the more he tries to punish Johnny, the more resentful he will be towards his father later in life. The next day, Johnny is amazed to learn Tsunami has great snowboarding ability, and they decide to ride the skiers' side of the mountain, where the best rides are.

Brett and his gang encounter Johnny and Tsunami, and decide to have a one-race challenge between Brett and Johnny Kapahala. If Johnny wins the race, then the skiers must share the mountain with the snowboarders. If Brett wins, then he is awarded the Tsunami Medal, a prize given to the best surfer in Hawaii. Pete encourages Johnny to win the race to keep the medal in the family. He wins the race, despite Brett's cheating attempts, allowing him and Emily to begin a relationship. Brett's friends congratulate Johnny and are inspired to learn how to snowboard with the Urchins.

Johnny's parents throw a celebration party. Identical Twin Brothers Randy and Ronnie Edison, who own the opposite sides of the mountain, reveal their story as they were the original Sky and Urchin. Their parents divorced long ago and they could not agree on what should happen when they inherited the mountain after their father died 10 years earlier. The mountain was split between the two, with the Skies having the best rides. Randy and Ronnie decide to reunite the mountain and open a new shop called Edison Brothers Air Summit which allows everyone access to the best slopes. The brothers thank Johnny for helping them see the error of their ways and the movie ends with Johnny and Emily slow dancing.

== Cast ==
- Brandon Baker as Johnny "Pono" Kapahala II
  - George "Tiger" Toelcke as Johnny's stunt double
- Yuji Okumoto as Pete Kapahala, Johnny's father
- Mary Page Keller as Melanie Kapahala, Johnny's mother
- Lee Thompson Young as Sam Sterling, Johnny's best friend
- Kirsten Storms as Emily Pritchard, Johnny's crush
- Zachary Bostrom as Brett, Johnny's rival
- Gregory Itzin as Headmaster Pritchard, Emily's father
- Cylk Cozart as Sergeant Sterling, Sam's widowed father
- Steve Van Wormer as:
  - Randy Edison: Ronnie's identical twin brother
  - Ronnie Edison: Randy's identical twin brother
- Cary-Hiroyuki Tagawa as Grandpa Johnny "Tsunami" Kapahala, Johnny's widowed paternal grandfather
- Gabriel Luque as Matt
- Taylor Moore as Jake
- Anthony DiFranco as Eddie
- Noah Bastian as Aaron
- Anne Sward as Miss Arthur
- Kevin Clifford as Garbage Man

== Production ==
The movie was filmed in locations such as Utah, including Brighton Ski Resort for many of the skiing and snowboarding scenes, and Hawaii.

== Songs ==
- "The Way" - Fastball
- "Fire Escape" - Fastball
- "Nowhere Road" - Fastball
- "Rolled" - Jeffries Fan Club
- "Crystal 52" - Jeffries Fan Club
- "So Down" - Jesse Camp
- "Life Jacket" - Simon Says

== Reception ==
In 2012, Complex ranked the film at number 2 on the magazine's list of the 25 best Disney Channel Original Movies. In March 2016, the film was ranked at number 35 on MTV's list of the best DCOMs, consisting of 99 films. The same year in May, Aubrey Page of Collider ranked each DCOM released up to that point. Page ranked Johnny Tsunami at number 30 and wrote that it "managed to combine surfing and winter sports into a veritable smorgasbord of sick Disney stunts". That month, Entertainment Weekly ranked it at number 10 on a list of the top 30 DCOMs, with writer Jonathon Dornbush calling the film "one of the most fun" and "finest fish-out-of-water DCOMs around".
