= One World (TV series) =

American television sitcom (1998–2001)

- Genre: Teen sitcom
- Created by: Robert Tarlow
- Starring: Bryan Kirkwood; Arroyn Lloyd; Harvey Silver; Alisa Reyes; Michelle Krusiec; Brandon Baker; Michael Toland; Elizabeth Morehead
- Theme music composer: Admusic; John Adair; Steve Hampton; Korbin Kraus
- Country of origin: United States
- Original language: English
- No. of seasons: 3
- No. of episodes: 39

Production
- Executive producer: Peter Engel
- Producer: Sue Feyk
- Camera setup: Multi-camera
- Running time: 22 minutes
- Production companies: Peter Engel Productions; NBC Enterprises

Original release
- Network: NBC
- Release: September 12, 1998 – January 6, 2001

One World is an American television teen sitcom that aired on the TNBC Saturday morning lineup from September 12, 1998 to January 6, 2001 on NBC. The series was created by Robert Tarlow and executive produced by Peter Engel.

The series was classified as educational under the Children's Television Act, due to its focus on morals and relationships, alongside other NBC shows including Hang Time and Saved by the Bell. However, along with other educational programming at the time, the show had limited popularity with teenagers, and was rarely viewed by elementary school aged children.

== Production ==
Each episode of the series cost $400,000.

== Premise ==
The series centered on the Blakes, a family mostly made up of six racially diverse foster teenagers living under one roof under the care of parents Dave, a former professional baseball player, and Karen, a sculptor.

== Cast ==
- Bryan Kirkwood as Ben Blake
- Arroyn Lloyd as Jane Blake
- Harvey Silver as Neal Smith
- Alisa Reyes as Marci Blake
- Michelle Krusiec as Sui Blake
- Brandon Baker as Cray Blake
- Michael Toland as Dave Blake
- Elizabeth Morehead as Karen Blake
- Kim Mai Guest as Kendra

== Episodes ==
=== Series overview ===
Season	Episodes	Originally released	
Season	Episodes	First released	Last released
1	13	September 12, 1998	December 12, 1998
2	13	September 11, 1999	January 1, 2000
3	13	September 23, 2000	January 6, 2001

=== Season 1 (1998) ===
No. overall	No. in season	Title	Directed by	Written by	Original release date
1	1	"Hurricane Jane"	Chuck Vinson	Robert Tarlow	September 12, 1998
2	2	"What's In a Name?"	Chuck Vinson	Robert Tarlow	September 19, 1998
3	3	"Marci's Job"	Chuck Vinson	Diana Ayers & Susan Sebastian	September 26, 1998
4	4	"The Gift"	Chuck Vinson	Robert Bradley & Michael Grodner	October 3, 1998
5	5	"Community Service"	Chuck Vinson	Kandace Yvette Williams	October 10, 1998
6	6	"The 12 Steps to Ben"	Chuck Vinson	Larry Spencer & Robert Tarlow	October 17, 1998
7	7	"Runaround Sui"	Chuck Vinson	Diana Ayers & Susan Sebastian	October 24, 1998
8	8	"Crushes, Lies & Zuckerman"	Chuck Vinson	Larry Spencer	October 31, 1998
9	9	"Two Flew Over the Cuckoo's Nest"	Chuck Vinson	Tod Himmel	November 14, 1998
10	10	"Ben's Brother"	Chuck Vinson	Kandace Yvette Williams	November 21, 1998
11	11	"The Thanksgiving Show"	Chuck Vinson	Pamela Pettler	November 28, 1998
12	12	"The One Where Sui & Alex Walk"	Chuck Vinson	Story by : Larry Spencer; Teleplay by : Diana Ayers & Susan Sebastian	December 5, 1998
13	13	"Love Is a Many Splintered Thing"	Chuck Vinson	Robert Tarlow	December 12, 1998

=== Season 2 (1999–2000) ===
No. overall	No. in season	Title	Directed by	Written by	Original release date
14	1	"Love and Foster's Kids's Aren't Always Blind"	Mary Lou Belli	Robert Tarlow	September 11, 1999
15	2	"Flushed with Love"	Mary Lou Belli	Diana Ayers & Susan Sebastian	September 18, 1999
16	3	"How Neal Got His Groove Back"	Mary Lou Belli	Tim Meinhart	October 2, 1999
17	4	"The Tangled Web"	Mary Lou Belli	Robert Tarlow	October 9, 1999
18	5	"Playing the Field"	Mary Lou Belli	Tom Tenowich	October 16, 1999
19	6	"Cyrano De Bengerac"	Mary Lou Belli	Diana Ayers & Susan Sebastian	October 23, 1999
20	7	"It's All Geek to Me"	Mary Lou Belli	Scott Yaffe	October 30, 1999
21	8	"Treasure of the Sierra Lotto"	Mary Lou Belli	Robert Tarlow	November 6, 1999
22	9	"A Walk on the Wild Side"	Mary Lou Belli	Bernie Ancheta	November 13, 1999
23	10	"Tough Love"	Mary Lou Belli	Tim Meinhart	November 20, 1999
24	11	"Band on the Run"	Mary Lou Belli	Robert Tarlow	November 27, 1999
25	12	"A Cheating Heart"	Mary Lou Belli	Chris Leavell	December 3, 1999
26	13	"Coming of Age"	Mary Lou Belli	Scott Yaffe	January 1, 2000

=== Season 3 (2000–01) ===
No. overall	No. in season	Title	Directed by	Written by	Original release date
27	1	"Guess Who's Coming to Dinner"	Mary Lou Belli	Diana Ayers & Susan Sebastian	September 23, 2000
28	2	"Push Comes to Shove"	Mary Lou Belli	Bernie Ancheta	September 30, 2000
29	3	"The Two Year Itch"	Mary Lou Belli	Scott Yaffe	October 7, 2000
30	4	"The Race Car"	Mary Lou Belli	Tim Meinhart	October 14, 2000
31	5	"One of Our Own"	Mary Lou Belli	Tom Tenowich	October 21, 2000
32	6	"Crushed"	Mary Lou Belli	Story by : Bernie Ancheta; Teleplay by : Tim Meinhart & Scott Yaffe	October 28, 2000
33	7	"Dad Strikes Out"	Mary Lou Belli	Scott Yaffe	November 4, 2000
34	8	"Sui's in for Stormy Weather"	Mary Lou Belli	Diana Ayers & Susan Sebastian	November 11, 2000
35	9	"Jane Cops Out"	Mary Lou Belli	Tim Meinhart	November 18, 2000
36	10	"Marci's in Hot Salsa"	Mary Lou Belli	Tanya Hekimian	November 25, 2000
37	11	"Roots"	Mary Lou Belli	Tom Tenowich	December 2, 2000
38	12	"Say Cheese"	Mary Lou Belli	Diana Ayers & Susan Sebastian	December 16, 2000
39	13	"Hitting on a Guy"	Mary Lou Belli	Robert Tarlow	January 6, 2001

== Awards and nominations ==
1999
YoungStar Awards

- Brandon Baker – Best Performance by a Young Actor in a Saturday Morning TV Program (won)
- Alisa Reyes – Best Performance by a Young Actress in a Saturday Morning TV Program (nominated)

2000
YoungStar Awards

- Brandon Baker – Best Young Actor/Performance in a Saturday Morning TV Program (won)
- Alisa Reyes – Best Young Actress/Performance in a Saturday Morning TV Program (nominated)

== Reception ==
In a 1999 review, Alice Li of The Plain Dealer opined that One World managed to escape the formula of "overall triteness and unbelievably happy endings" that every Saturday morning teen comedy featured, though only "by a hair's breadth". Li praised the acting of Brandon Baker, Alisa Reyes and Michelle Krusiec, though criticized that of Bryan Kirkwood and Elizabeth Morehead. While describing the scripts as "cleverly written", she lamented that some lines were ineffectively delivered by actors, and concluded it was "a show with a solid story line and much less fluff" than others on the Saturday morning line-up.
