= Harry and the Hendersons (TV series) =

- Genre: Sitcom
- Starring: Bruce Davison; Molly Cheek; Carol-Ann Plante; Zachary Bostrom; Kevin Peter Hall; Dawan Scott; Brian Steele
- Opening theme: "Your Feet's Too Big" performed by Leon Redbone
- Composer: Todd Hayen
- Country of origin: United States
- Original language: English
- No. of seasons: 3
- No. of episodes: 72

Production
- Executive producer: Lin Oliver
- Producers: Jill Lopez Danton; Sheree Guitar
- Cinematography: Robert Caramico
- Editor: Andy Zall
- Camera setup: Single-camera
- Running time: 22–24 minutes
- Production companies: Amblin Television; MCA TV

Original release
- Network: first-run syndication
- Release: January 13, 1991 – June 18, 1993

Related
- Harry and the Hendersons

Harry and the Hendersons is an American sitcom based on the film of the same name, produced by Amblin Television for Universal Television. It aired in syndication from January 13, 1991, to June 18, 1993, with 72 half-hour episodes produced. It is about a family who adopts a Bigfoot called Harry.

== Synopsis ==
Bruce Davison and Molly Cheek played the parents George and Nancy (in the film, they were played by John Lithgow and Melinda Dillon respectively) with Carol-Ann Plante and Zachary Bostrom as the children Sarah and Ernie (in the film, they were played by Margaret Langrick and Joshua Rudoy respectively). Kevin Peter Hall played the role of Harry in both the film and TV series, until his death late in the production of the first season. He was replaced first by Dawan Scott and then by Brian Steele in the third season (Steele had filled in for Scott in the Harry costume for numerous scenes during season two, before taking over the role full-time). Harry's vocal effects were provided by Patrick Pinney, where the vocal effects were previously provided by Fred Newman in the film.

In the series, George and Nancy were an upwardly mobile two-career couple, with the former working for a sporting goods company. George eventually launched his own magazine, The Better Life, late in the second season. Initially helping the Hendersons with Harry's care, and Sasquatch research, was Walter Potter, a biologist working for the Department of Animal Control. Also seen early on were the Glicks, neighbors of the Hendersons; Samantha was a pretty, young single mother and reporter, and Tiffany was her precocious little girl, a classmate of Ernie's who had an obvious crush on him. Samantha, Tiffany, and Walter were all written out after the first season, but the aspect of having a girl next door who chased after Ernie was retained through a new character, Darcy Payne, for the 1991–92 season. Darcy was more annoying than her predecessor, and spent all her waking hours trying to make the Hendersons' young son hers. However, she did catch on to the fact that the family was hiding a bigfoot, and had several close encounters with Harry; fortunately, Darcy disappeared from the show before she could have exposed the secret about him. Nancy's younger brother Brett, a photographer, moved in with the Hendersons in the second season, and was also sworn to secrecy about Harry. When George began The Better Life in the spring of 1992, Brett was hired as the publication's chief photographer and a financial beneficiary.

The following year brought many changes, as in the season premiere Harry's existence was accidentally exposed. Just as the Hendersons feared he would be captured by the government and possibly killed, he was rather embraced by the public and received overnight regional fame. For a while, Harry had to adjust to a high-profile life full of exhibition and additional scientific studies, but at the same time the entire family got used to resting more comfortably now that they did not have to hide the big creature from view anymore. Hilton, a friend of Ernie's and the son of a local police chief, joined the cast in the third season.

The TV series credits contains an artistic representation of key scenes from the film.

== Cast ==
=== Harry ===
- Kevin Peter Hall (1991)
- Dawan Scott (1991–1992)
- Brian Steele (1992–1993)
- N. Brock Winkless IV (face performer, 1991–1993)
- Patrick Pinney (vocal effects, 1991–1993)

=== Humans ===
- Bruce Davison as George Henderson
- Molly Cheek as Nancy Henderson
- Carol-Ann Plante as Sarah Henderson
- Zachary Bostrom as Ernie Henderson
- Gigi Rice as Samantha Glick (1991)
- Cassie Cole as Tiffany Glick (1991)
- David Coburn as Walter Potter (1991–1993)
- Noah Blake as Brett Douglas (1991–1993)
- Courtney Peldon as Darcy Payne (1991–1992)
- Mark Dakota Robinson as Hilton Woods, Jr. (1992–1993)
- Jared Henderson as Himself (1992)

== Episodes ==
Season	Episodes	Originally released	
Season	Episodes	First released	Last released
1	18	January 13, 1991	May 26, 1991
2	24	September 29, 1991	May 17, 1992
3	30	September 18, 1992	June 18, 1993

=== Season 1 (1991) ===
No. overall	No. in season	Title	Directed by	Written by	Original release date
1	1	"The Arrival"	Frank Bonner	Story by : Lin Oliver & Alan Moskowitz; Teleplay by : Alan Moskowitz	January 13, 1991
2	2	"The Day After"	Alan Cooke	John Boni	January 20, 1991
3	3	"Cool"	Frank Bonner	Lin Oliver & Alan Moskowitz	January 27, 1991
4	4	"Harry Goes Home: Part 1"	Tony Dow	Sam Denoff & Marc Sheffler	February 3, 1991
5	5	"Whose Forest Is It Anyway?: Part 2"	Tony Dow	Sam Denoff & Marc Sheffler	February 10, 1991
6	6	"The Father-Son Game"	Frank Bonner	R.J. Colleary	February 17, 1991
7	7	"Bagging the Big One"	Frank Bonner	Daryl Nickens & Mike Scott	February 24, 1991
8	8	"Harry the Hero"	Tony Dow	Laura Levine	March 3, 1991
9	9	"Roots, the Herb"	Alan Cooke	Ezra D. Rappaport & J.D. Rappaport	March 10, 1991
10	10	"The Mentor"	Frank Bonner	Alan Moskowitz	March 17, 1991
11	11	"The Bodyguard"	Don Amendolia	Story by : Sam Denoff & Marc Sheffler; Teleplay by : Barry Bleach & Lynne Kadish	March 24, 1991
12	12	"Harry and the Homeless Man"	Tony Dow	Gerry Matthews	April 7, 1991
13	13	"Harry Goes Ape"	Frank Bonner	Michael Poryes	April 21, 1991
14	14	"Pet Psychic"	Frank Bonner	Julie Moskowitz & Gary Stephens	April 28, 1991
15	15	"The Bigfoot That Ate Seattle"	Don Amendolia	Alan Moskowitz	May 5, 1991
16	16	"Harry and the Masked Wrestler"	Richard Kline	John Boni	May 12, 1991
17	17	"When Harry Met Sammy"	Lee Bernhardi	R.J. Colleary	May 19, 1991
18	18	"Harry and the Cheerleaders"	Lee Bernhardi	Sam Denoff & Marc Sheffler	May 26, 1991

=== Season 2 (1991–92) ===
No. overall	No. in season	Title	Directed by	Written by	Original release date
19	1	"Retrospective"	Frank Bonner	Lin Oliver & Alan Moskowitz	September 29, 1991
20	2	"The Terror of the Trees"	James Widdoes	Story by : R.J. Colleary; Teleplay by : Paul J. Raley	October 6, 1991
21	3	"Sarah Sings the Blues"	Frank Bonner	Lin Oliver & Alan Moskowitz	October 13, 1991
22	4	"Mom"	Bruce Davison	Colman Dekay & James L. Freedman	October 20, 1991
23	5	"The Ransom of Bigfoot"	Lee Bernhardi	David Wiemers & Ken Koonce	October 27, 1991
24	6	"Halloween"	Scott Baio	Diana "Jennie" Ayers & Susan Sebastian	November 3, 1991
25	7	"Brett Hits Home"	Nick Havinga	R.J. Colleary	November 10, 1991
26	8	"George's White Light"	Nick Havinga	Lin Oliver	November 17, 1991
27	9	"Working Stiffs"	Tony Dow	Alan Moskowitz	November 24, 1991
28	10	"Love Mask"	Tony Dow	Tom Biener & Bob Fraser	January 12, 1992
29	11	"The Blue Parrot"	Dwayne Hickman	Shari Scharfer & Julie Strassman	January 19, 1992
30	12	"Winning"	Nick Havinga	R.J. Colleary	January 26, 1992
31	13	"'Til Theft Do Us Part"	Nick Havinga	Colman DeKay & James L. Freedman	February 2, 1992
32	14	"The Genius"	Lee Lochhead	Carol Croland	February 9, 1992
33	15	"Wild Things"	Bobby Bosse	Robin J. Stein	February 16, 1992
34	16	"Fatherhood"	Howard Murray	Bruce Rush	February 23, 1992
35	17	"Sarah Spills the Bigfoot Beans"	Dwayne Hickman	Robin J. Stein	March 1, 1992
36	18	"Moonlighting"	Nick Havinga	Story by : Alan Moskowitz; Teleplay by : Laura Levine	March 22, 1992
37	19	"The Green Eyed Bigfoot"	Howard Murray	Lauren Eve Anderson	March 29, 1992
38	20	"The Itchologist"	Howard Murray	Story by : Ezra D. Rappaport & J.D. Rappaport; Teleplay by : Alan Moskowitz	April 5, 1992
39	21	"Selling Out"	Lee Lochhead	Matt Ember	April 26, 1992
40	22	"The Girl Who Cried Bigfoot"	Lee Lochhead	R.J. Colleary	May 3, 1992
41	23	"The Busybody"	Richard T. Kline	Mark Amato	May 10, 1992
42	24	"I Got Your Birthday Right Here"	Howard Murray	Sheree Guitar	May 17, 1992

=== Season 3 (1992–93) ===
No. overall	No. in season	Title	Directed by	Written by	Original release date
43	1	"Yo Richie!"	Howard Murray	Marc Wilmore	September 18, 1992
44	2	"The Candidate"	Lee Lochhead	Alan Moskowitz	September 25, 1992
45	3	"The Bride and the Gloom"	Lee Lochhead	Story by : R.J. Colleary; Teleplay by : Matt Ember & Ray DeLaurentis	October 2, 1992
46	4	"Born Again"	Bruce Davison	Lin Oliver & Alan Moskowitz	October 30, 1992
47	5	"The Old Bigfoot"	Frank Bonner	R.J. Colleary	November 6, 1992
48	6	"The Outing"	Nick Havinga	R.J. Colleary	November 13, 1992
49	7	"Harry Henderson, National Treasure"	Howard Murray	Lin Oliver & Alan Moskowitz	November 20, 1992
50	8	"Retrospective Two"	Frank Bonner	Lin Oliver & Alan Moskowitz & R.J. Colleary	January 2, 1993
51	9	"Blood Is Thicker Than Karma"	Lee Lochhead	Ray DeLaurentis	January 22, 1993
52	10	"Pitch, Pitch, Pitch"	Lee Lochhead	Sheree Guitar	January 29, 1993
53	11	"Harry the Mascot"	Howard Murray	Robin J. Stein	February 5, 1993
54	12	"The Big Kiss Off"	Nick Havinga	Alan Moskowitz	February 12, 1993
55	13	"The Frenchman"	Nick Havinga	Bruce A. Rush	February 19, 1993
56	14	"Laid Up"	Donna Pescow	Don Hart	February 26, 1993
57	15	"Harrywood Babylon"	Howard Murray	Colman DeKay & James L. Freedman	March 5, 1993
58	16	"Witness: Part 1"	Nick Havinga	Story by : John Zuur Platten & Tony Cabalu; Teleplay by : R.J. Colleary	March 12, 1993
59	17	"Harry the Hostage: Part 2"	Nick Havinga	Story by : John Zuur Platten & Tony Cabalu; Teleplay by : R.J. Colleary	March 19, 1993
60	18	"Exterminator"	Howard Murray	Si Rose	March 26, 1993
61	19	"Beauty and the Beast"	Bruce Davison	Story by : Sandy Helberg; Teleplay by : Robin J. Stein	April 2, 1993
62	20	"Big Feet, Small Minds"	Lee Lochhead	Matt Ember	April 9, 1993
63	21	"Surf's Down"	Nick Havinga	Alan Moskowitz	April 16, 1993
64	22	"Follow Your Art"	Lee Lochhead	Sheree Guitar	April 23, 1993
65	23	"Them Bones"	Lee Lochhead	R. J. Colleary	April 30, 1993
66	24	"The Three Facts of Brett"	Lee Lochhead	Story by : R.J. Colleary; Teleplay by : Tony Cabalu & John Zuur Platten	May 7, 1993
67	25	"Ernie Confidential"	Richard Kline	Robin J. Stein & Ray DeLaurentis	May 14, 1993
68	26	"Uncle Mack Comes Back"	Nick Havinga	Alan Moskowitz	May 21, 1993
69	27	"Skin Deep"	Lee Lochhead	Sheree Guitar	May 28, 1993
70	28	"Retrospective Three"	Howard Murray	Story by : Lin Oliver & R. J. Colleary; Teleplay by : Lin Oliver	June 4, 1993
71	29	"The Long Goodbyes: Part 1"	Howard Murray	Story by : Lin Oliver & R.J. Colleary; Teleplay by : R.J. Colleary	June 11, 1993
72	30	"The Long Goodbyes: Part 2"	Lee Lochhead	Story by : Lin Oliver & R.J. Colleary; Teleplay by : Lin Oliver	June 18, 1993

== Production ==
Among the series' directors were series star Bruce Davison, Scott Baio, Frank Bonner, Tony Dow, Richard Kline, Dwayne Hickman, and Donna Pescow.

The series' theme song was "Your Feet's Too Big", performed by Leon Redbone. The show was financed by Fox Television Stations, whose stations cleared the show.

Reruns aired on digital subchannel Retro Television Network from August 2008 until their distribution agreement with NBCUniversal ended in June 2011.

In December 2025, the show became available for streaming on Tubi.

== Broadcast stations ==
City	Station
Albany	WXXA 23
Anchorage	KYES 5
Asheville	WLOS 13
Baltimore	WNUV 54
Bloomington	WYZZ 43
Boston	WFXT 25
Buffalo	WUTV 29
Charleston	WVAH 11
Dallas	KDAF 33
Fort Smith	KPBI 46
Houston	KRIV 26
Indianapolis	WXIN 59
Lakeland	WMOR 32
Los Angeles	KTTV 11
Merrimack	WGOT 60
New York	WNYW 5
Oklahoma City	KOKH 25
Orlando	WKCF 18
Philadelphia	WPSG 57
Phoenix	KPHO 5
Portland	KPDX 49
Spokane	KAYU 28
St. Louis	KPLR 11
Washington, DC	WTTG 5
Waterbury	WTXX 20
