= The Millennium (Seinfeld) =

- Seinfeld episode
- Episode no.: Season 8 Episode 20
- Directed by: Andy Ackerman
- Written by: Jennifer Crittenden
- Production code: 820
- Original air date: May 1, 1997

Guest appearances
- Wayne Knight as Newman; Richard Herd as Wilhelm; Lauren Graham as Valerie; Louan Gideon as Mrs. Hamilton; Victoria Mahoney as Gladys; Michael Luskin as Minkler; Bruce Jarchow as Mooney; Maria Cina as Saleswoman; Larry David as George Steinbrenner (voice, uncredited); Steve Koren as himself

Episode chronology
← Previous "The Yada Yada"	Next → "The Muffin Tops"
- Seinfeld season 8

"The Millennium" is the 154th episode of the NBC sitcom Seinfeld. It was the 20th episode of the eighth season and aired on May 1, 1997. In this episode, Kramer and Newman plan rival millennium parties, George tries to get fired in the most spectacular manner possible, and Jerry ends up in a three-way struggle with his girlfriend and his girlfriend's stepmother over what numbers they appear at on each other's speed dial.

== Plot ==
The New York Mets management secretly asks George to leave the New York Yankees and become their head scout, but he needs to get fired first. He decides to go out in a blaze of glory, but his efforts only end up making him look better. He wears Babe Ruth's uniform and deliberately gets food stains on it, but Mr. Steinbrenner praises him, thinking it shows an "out with the old, in with the new" mentality. George runs through Yankee Stadium during a game, wearing a flesh-colored body suit, that wins the enthusiasm of fans. He destroys a Yankees' World Series trophy by hitching it to his car and driving through the parking lot while screaming insults with a megaphone. That finally raises the ire of Steinbrenner, but Mr. Wilhelm takes the blame for ordering the destruction of the trophy, getting fired and taking the job with the Mets.

Elaine tries to run an ethnic-themed clothing store called "Putumayo" out of business after receiving bad customer service from the owner. She shops extensively at a competing store, "Cinco de Mayo", only to discover that the same woman owns both stores. She schemes with Kramer to change all the Putumayo price tags to 99 cents, but he accidentally breaks the pricing gun before he can finish. Instead, he takes the desiccant packs from the clothes. When he eats some chips the store gives out to customers, he unknowingly drops one of the desiccant packs in the salsa.

Kramer and Newman are planning rival millennium parties. Newman's party is called "Newmannium". Fearing all his friends will go to Newmannium, Kramer accepts an offer to co-host Newmannium instead, but Newman insists that they do not invite Jerry. However, moved by loyalty to Jerry, Kramer resurrects his own party and gets Elaine to come. Newman decides to allow Jerry to come to Newmannium to ensure that Elaine will be there. Jerry points out to Newman that since he booked Newmannium for the Millennium new year, the hotel would have scheduled it on December 31, 2000, due to there being no year zero, while millennium celebrations are held almost universally on December 31, 1999, making Newman's party a year late.

After a sub-par date, Jerry notices his girlfriend, Valerie, has moved his number on her speed dial from number 7 to 9. He takes her on an extravagant date and is rewarded by getting his speed dial "ranking" boosted up to 1. Valerie's domineering stepmom is furious that she's lost her number 1 spot and puts Jerry on her speed dial. When Valerie sees that, she takes her stepmom off her speed dial altogether. Valerie gets Jerry to negotiate to get himself off her stepmom's speed dial in exchange for Valerie restoring her, but her stepmom only concedes to hiding Jerry's number as one of her emergency speed dials. After her stepmom is poisoned by eating the desiccant-contaminated salsa, Valerie uses the phone to call poison control. When Jerry answers, Valerie hangs up in disgust.

== Production ==
The table read for the episode was held on March 5, 1997, and filming took place on March 11.

The fans cavorting with the bodysuit-clad George were played by Seinfeld writers Steve Koren, Gregg Kavet, Andy Robin, and Spike Feresten. Cut material from the episode included a callback to "The Comeback": When George is talking about getting fired, Kramer asks "Is Steinbrenner married?", prompting George to angrily shoot back "I'm not saying I had sex with his wife!" The scenes with Jerry and Valerie’s stepmother parody The Graduate.
