= Louan Gideon =

American actress (1955–2014)

- Born: November 12, 1955; Erath County, Texas, U.S.
- Died: February 3, 2014 (aged 58); Asheville, North Carolina, U.S.
- Education: Baylor University (1978)
- Occupation: Actress
- Years active: 1985–2013
- Spouse: Walt Borchers (m. 2011; died 2014)

Louan Gideon (November 12, 1955 – February 3, 2014) was an American actress best known for her role as antagonist Danielle Atron on Nickelodeon's The Secret World of Alex Mack. She was also the last actress to play Liza Walton Sentell on the long-running soap opera Search for Tomorrow.

== Biography ==
Born in Erath County, Texas, Gideon was a jazz singer in Europe and Asia before becoming an actress in the US. Gideon earned a Bachelor of Arts degree at Baylor University in Waco, Texas (1978); she majored in oral communications (radio-television-film). In her freshman year, she was voted as a "Baylor Beauty" - rare for a freshman.

In 2006, she left Los Angeles for the Blue Ridge Mountains of Asheville, North Carolina, where she continued her career as a writer and stage actress. She successfully battled breast cancer in 2009, and in 2011 married her long-time partner, veteran entertainment executive Walt Borchers. The ceremony took place in Lake Como, Italy, and was presided over by their close friend Bryan Cranston. Her cancer returned in late 2013 and she died on February 3, 2014, at age 58.

== Filmography ==
=== Film ===
| Year | Title | Role | Notes |
|---|---|---|---|
| 1989 | Easy Wheels | Molly Wolf | |
| 1993 | Airborne | Mrs. Goosen | |
| 1999 | P.U.N.K.S. | Ms. Grimes | |
| 1999 | Treehouse Hostage | Mrs. Stevens | |
| 2013 | 10 Rules for Sleeping Around | Laura | |

=== Television ===
| Year | Title | Role | Notes |
|---|---|---|---|
| 1985–86 | Search for Tomorrow | Liza Walton Sentell | Regular role |
| 1989 | Where There's a Will | Cavatina Andretti | TV film |
| 1989 | Dragnet | Cheryl Dodds | "Cardiac Arrest" |
| 1990 | Night Court | Sonia Blair | "Can't Buy Me Love" |
| 1991 | They Came from Outer Space | Dr. B. L. Hinton | "Play Doctor" |
| 1991 | Eerie, Indiana | Betty Wilson | "Foreverware" |
| 1991 | Princesses | Wanda | "Luv Leddahs" |
| 1991 | Get a Life | Tammy | "Meat Locker 2000" |
| 1992 | Night Court | Heidi | "Party Girl: Part 2", "Opportunity Knock Knocks: Part 2" |
| 1992 | Saved by the Bell | Mrs. Becky Belding | "Earthquake" |
| 1993 | Beverly Hills, 90210 | Gina | "Midlife... Now What?" |
| 1994 | One West Waikiki | Commander Benson | "Til Death Do Us Part" |
| 1994–98 | The Secret World of Alex Mack | Danielle Atron | Recurring role |
| 1995 | Saved by the Bell: The New Class | Mrs. Belding | "The Christmas Gift" |
| 1996 | L.A. Firefighters | Donna Ryan | "So What Else Happened" |
| 1996 | The Home Court | Lisa | "Laborer of Love" |
| 1996 | Dark Skies | Tammy | "Dreamland" |
| 1997 | Seinfeld | Mrs. Hamilton | "The Millennium" |
| 1998 | The Tom Show | Maylee | "Tom vs. the PTA", "The Band" |
| 2001 | Sabrina, the Teenage Witch | Eleanor | "Tick-Tock Hilda's Clock" |
| 2001 | Six Feet Under | Grieving Woman | "Life's Too Short" |
| 2003 | Joan of Arcadia | Val Wyatt | "The Fire and the Wood" |
| 2004 | Malcolm in the Middle | Woman | "Dewey's Special Class" |
