= Treehouse Hostage =

1998 film by Sean McNamara

- Poster
- Directed by: Sean McNamara
- Written by: Scot Lewis; Jeff Phillips
- Produced by: David Brookwell
- Starring: Jim Varney; Joey Zimmerman
- Cinematography: Mark Doering-Powell
- Edited by: Gregory Hobson
- Music by: John Coda
- Production companies: Brookwell McNamara Entertainment; Porchlight Entertainment
- Distributed by: Trimark Pictures
- Release date: September 24, 1999
- Running time: 91 minutes
- Country: United States
- Language: English

Treehouse Hostage is a 1999 family film directed by Sean McNamara and starring Jim Varney and Joey Zimmerman. It was Varney's final on-screen role before his death; he was diagnosed with terminal lung cancer during production of the film in August 1998 and died in 2000.

== Plot ==
Carl Banks is a dangerous counterfeiter and escapes from jail. Meanwhile, 11-year-old Timmy Taylor has a current project due on Monday and if he shows up empty handed he is going to summer school, simply because of his lack of participation in class, and that his teacher and Principal Ott hate him.

Carl Banks tries to print some more money and finds one of the counterfeit plates but can't print any money when his crooked ex-boss and his cops, who are counterfeiters as well, catch him at his base. He runs into Timmy Taylor's backyard and ends up in his treehouse. Timmy and his two best friends keep him hostage in Timmy's treehouse so that Timmy can take him to school on Monday to ace Current Events.

However, keeping a major criminal hostage is more of a handful than they expected, due to the huge wedgies that Carl delivers. Until Timmy figures out that Carl is in the middle of a major counterfeit ring, Timmy & his friends help get revenge on the men who treated Carl badly (surprisingly, Timmy's principal is Carl's ex-boss who turned him in to the authorities), in exchange for counterfeit money, of course.

Timmy and his friends persuade his neighbor and rival Janie Paulson and her friend Angela to help them create a fake cash plate in order to lay a trap and Carl captures Ott and his men. The evil principal gets away, Carl is set free as the kids tape recorded them running into the counterfeit gang and it proves Carl's innocence. Carl is offered witness protection if he cooperates and he does.

At school on Monday, Timmy's teacher doesn't believe his story until the police show up with Carl and arrest the principal for being the counterfeit gang's leader. As the school applauds Timmy and celebrates Ott's defeat, Janie kisses Timmy on the cheek. Timmy also gets a reward check for his actions which his dog buries in the backyard later that night.

== Cast ==
- Jim Varney as Carl Banks
- Joey Zimmerman as Timmy Taylor
- Kristopher Kachurak as Buddy
- Todd Bosley as Stevie
- Mark Moses as Mr. Taylor
- Debby Boone as Mrs. Taylor
- Richard Kline as Principal Ott
- Jack McGee as Nick
- Christopher Doyle as Scalise
- Aria Noelle Curzon as Janie Paulson
- Cliff Emmich as Detective Nelson
- Louan Gideon as Mrs. Stevens
- Frank Welker as Kato (voice)
- Vincent Schiavelli as Gardener (uncredited)

== Release ==
Treehouse Hostage was released direct to video in June 1999.

== Reception ==
Critical reception for the film has been mixed. The AV Club described Treehouse Hostage as a "rather dismal Disney Channel movie". Video Business was more favorable, calling it a "harmless summer-vacation video fare, bright and clever without relying on Varney's wom-out Ernest persona for laughs". The Fort Worth Star-Telegram also rated the film favorably.
