= John Coda =

American musician

John Coda is an American composer with a focus on film music and television scoring.

== Life ==
Coda was born in Los Angeles and began composing music when he was still in his teens. He learned to play the drums, piano and flute. After earning his Bachelor of Music degree in composition at California State University, Northridge, he worked for various recording studios in Hollywood, dedicating himself to film and television scoring. Today, Coda lives in Santa Monica, Southern California.

== Film selections ==
- 1994: Red Sun Rising
- 1994–1995: The Secret World of Alex Mack (TV series)
- 1995: The Disappearance of Kevin Johnson
- 1996: Sworn to Justice
- 1998: By Default (short)
- 1998: 3 Ninjas: High Noon at Mega Mountain
- 1999: Wild Grizzly (TV film)
- 1999: P.U.N.K.S.
- 1999: Treehouse Hostage
- 2000: Mom & Me (short)
- 2000: Primary Suspect
- 2000: The Trial of Old Drum (TV film)
- 2000: Just Sue Me
- 2001: Race to Space
- 2002: Girl Fever
- 2000–2003: Even Stevens (TV series)
- 2003: Monster Man
- 2004: Let's Love Hate (short)
- 2003–2007: That's So Raven (TV series)
- 2006: The Cutting Edge: Going for the Gold
- 2006: Beyond the Break (TV series)
- 2006: Just for Kicks (TV series)
- 2007: If I Had Known I Was a Genius
- 2007: Bratz
- 2009: Legally Blondes
- 2012: Chilly Christmas
- 2013: Baby Geniuses and the Mystery of the Crown Jewels
- 2013: A Sierra Nevada Gunfight
- 2013: Robosapien: Rebooted
- 2014: Baby Geniuses and the Treasures of Egypt
- 2015: Hoovey
- 2015: Baby Geniuses and the Space Baby
- 2015: Just in Time for Christmas
- 2022: The King's Daughter
- 2024: Reagan
