= Hollywood Chaos =

1989 film by Sean McNamara

- Directed by: Sean McNamara
- Written by: Bernie Ancheta; Chris Dunne; Paul Hoen
- Produced by: David Brookwell; Sean McNamara
- Starring: Tricia Leigh Fisher; Timothy Williams
- Cinematography: Christian Sebaldt
- Edited by: John Hazelton; Mike Jackson
- Music by: David Bergeaud
- Release date: 1989
- Running time: 90 minutes
- Country: United States
- Language: English

Hollywood Chaos is American film that was released in 1989. The film starred Tricia Leigh Fisher and Timothy Williams and was directed by Sean McNamara, marking his directorial debut.

== Plot ==
A farm girl from Iowa moves to Hollywood to pursue her dreams in show business. She joins a major production chorus line, but chaos ensues when all the major actors drop out and are replaced by look-alikes.
