= Revenge of the Red Baron =

1994 American film

- DVD cover
- Directed by: Robert Gordon
- Written by: Michael McDonald
- Produced by: Roger Corman; Mike Elliott; Scott P. Levy
- Starring: Mickey Rooney; Tobey Maguire; Laraine Newman; Cliff De Young; Darryl Armbruster
- Cinematography: Christian Sebaldt
- Edited by: Robert Gordon; Ken Solomon
- Music by: Robert Randles
- Distributed by: New Concorde
- Release date: February 16, 1994
- Running time: 100 minutes
- Country: United States
- Language: English

Revenge of the Red Baron, alternatively titled Plane Fear, is a 1994 American comedy horror film starring Mickey Rooney, Tobey Maguire, Laraine Newman, Cliff De Young, produced by Roger Corman and directed by Robert Gordon.

== Plot ==
The Red Baron returns in a toy plane to kill the former World War I flying ace that shot him down.

== Reception ==
In 2005, Dread Central writer Jon Condit, as part of the site's column highlighting obscure films, panned the film and questioned the intention of producer Roger Corman, noting that it contained elements of horror, comedy and family films, but it does not consistently mix any of its genre elements:

The plot sounds straight out of a horror film, but the way it plays out – despite how nearly every joke falls flat with a resounding “thud” – is clearly meant to be humorous, and yet it’s often cartoonish nature brings to mind a direct-to-video family film, albeit one with more electrocutions, (bloodless) shooting deaths, and gratuitous obscenities than that genre is used to.
