= Christian Sebaldt =

German cinematographer

- Born: Munich, West Germany
- Occupation: Cinematographer
- Website: sebaldt-asc.com

Christian Sebaldt ASC is a German cinematographer based in the United States. He won a Primetime Emmy Award for Outstanding Cinematography for a Single-Camera Series (One Hour) for his work on the television series CSI: Crime Scene Investigation (2000–15). His feature film credits have included Resident Evil: Apocalypse, FearDotCom, The Dark, Reagan and Final Destination Bloodlines. He frequently collaborates with director Sean McNamara.

== Early life ==
Sebaldt was born and raised in Munich, Germany. Sebaldt's first serious exposure to the film industry was as a trainee at Bavaria Film, a studio in Munich. He spent time in multiple departments, including the visual effects unit, gaining experience that later served him well on effects-heavy projects.

== Career ==
Sebaldt's first professional credit was on the Rainer Werner Fassbinder film Lili Marleen, where he served as an assistant to director of photography Xaver Schwarzenberger. In 1984, Sebaldt relocated to Los Angeles and began work on numerous projects, including music videos and television commercials. He shot 13 episodes of the Nickelodeon series The Secret World of Alex Mack, and over 50 episodes of the series America's Most Wanted. He served as DP for the first two seasons of the crime drama Pacific Blue. Around this time, he became a regular collaborator of director Sean McNamara, shooting films like Galgameth, Casper: A Spirited Beginning, P.U.N.K.S., and Race to Space. In total, he has accumulated over 40 feature film credits.

Since the 2002 direct-to-video science-fiction film Starship Troopers 2: Hero of the Federation, many of Sebaldt's projects have been filmed on digital video rather than film. He applied this style of dark, gritty photography onto films like Resident Evil: Apocalypse and FeardotCom, and on television series like CSI: Crime Scene Investigation, for which he received a Primetime Emmy Award for Outstanding Cinematography for a Single-Camera Series and a Kodak Vision Award, as well as a nomination for an ASC Award.

Sebaldt has also shot and directed commercials for companies like Toyota, Samsonite and Energizer.

== Personal life ==
Sebaldt is a member of the American Society of Cinematographers, the Academy of Motion Picture Arts and Sciences, the Academy of Television Arts & Sciences, and the Visual Effects Society, among others. He has been married since 2001 to script supervisor Mary Anne Seward, with whom he has had one child.

Christian currently lives in Los Angeles, California.

== Filmography ==
=== Film ===
Year	Title	Director	Notes
1988	Children of the Empire	Clif Lord	
1989	Mortal Passions	Andrew Lane	
1989	Wedding Band	Daniel Raskov	
1989	Hollywood Chaos	Sean McNamara	Also co-executive producer
1992	Bloodfist IV: Die Trying	Paul Ziller	
1993	Scorned	Andrew Stevens	
1994	Caroline at Midnight	Scott McGinnis	
1994	Inevitable Grace	Alex Monty Canawati	
1994	Revenge of the Red Baron	Robert Gordon	
1994	No Dessert, Dad, till You Mow the Lawn	Howard McCain	
1994	Illicit Dreams	Andrew Stevens	
1995	Wild Bill: Hollywood Maverick	Todd Robinson	Documentary
1996	Galgameth	Sean McNamara	
1997	Casper: A Spirited Beginning	Sean McNamara	
1997	Crayola Kids Adventures: The Trojan Horse	Michael Kruzan	
1997	Crayola Kids Adventures: Tales of Gulliver's Travels	Fritz Kiersch	
1998	Richie Rich's Christmas Wish	John Murlowski	
1998	By Default	Sean McNamara	Short
1998	Casper Meets Wendy	Sean McNamara	
1999	P.U.N.K.S.	Sean McNamara	
2001	Race to Space	Sean McNamara	
2002	FeardotCom	William Malone	
2004	Resident Evil: Apocalypse	Alexander Witt	
2005	The Dark	John Fawcett	
2006	Crossover	Preston A. Whitmore II	
2007	Bratz	Sean McNamara	
2007	The Move	Jason Epperson	Short
2008	Parasomnia	William Malone	
2013	Robosapien: Rebooted	Sean McNamara	
2017	ZBurbs	Greg Zekowski	Also co-executive producer
2023	On a Wing and a Prayer	Sean McNamara	
2024	Reagan	Sean McNamara	
2025	Final Destination Bloodlines	Zach Lipovsky; Adam Stein	
2027	21 Down †	Sean McNamara	Post-production

=== Television ===
Year	Title	Notes
1994–95	The Secret World of Alex Mack	13 episodes
1995	America's Most Wanted	Episode: "John Bertsch"
1996–97	Pacific Blue	31 episodes
2000	The Brothers García	Episode: "The Right Stuff"
2007	On the Lot	3 episodes
2007	Die Hardly Working	TV short
2007	Open House	TV short
2008–15	CSI: Crime Scene Investigation	74 episodes
2016	Rush Hour	6 episodes
2017	Lucifer	15 episodes
2019	Grey's Anatomy	4 episodes
2019	For the People	10 episodes
2019–20	How to Get Away with Murder	8 episodes
2021–22	Station 19	4 episodes
2022–24	CSI: Vegas	12 episodes

==== TV movies, miniseries, and specials ====
Year	Title	Director
1998	Addams Family Reunion	Dave Payne
2000	Time Share	Sharon von Wietersheim
2003	The Even Stevens Movie	Sean McNamara
2004	Starship Troopers 2: Hero of the Federation	Phil Tippett
2004	Species III	Brad Turner
2005	Haunting Sarah	Ralph Hemecker
2006	Stephen King's Desperation	Mick Garris
2016	Forever Boys	Adam Stein

== Awards and nominations ==
Award	Year	Category	Work	Result
American Society of Cinematographers Award	2010	Outstanding Cinematography in an Episode of a One-Hour Television Series – Non-Commercial	CSI: Crime Scene Investigation ("Family Affair")	Nominated
Primetime Emmy Award	2010	Outstanding Cinematography for a Series (One Hour)	CSI: Crime Scene Investigation ("Family Affair")	Won
