= Race to Space =

2001 film by Sean McNamara

- DVD cover
- Directed by: Sean McNamara
- Written by: Eric Gardner; Steven H. Wilson
- Produced by: David Brookwell; Sean McNamara
- Starring: James Woods; Annabeth Gish; Alex D. Linz; William Devane; William Atherton
- Narrated by: Tony Jay
- Cinematography: Christian Sebaldt
- Edited by: Gregory Hobson
- Music by: John Coda
- Production company: Brookwell McNamara Entertainment
- Release dates: October 31, 2001 (France); March 13, 2002 (Los Angeles); March 15, 2002 (U.S.)
- Running time: 104 minutes
- Language: English
- Budget: $4,750,000

Race to Space is a 2001 American family drama film. The film was shot on location at Cape Canaveral and Cocoa Beach and Edwards AFB in cooperation with NASA and the U.S. Air Force.

== Plot ==
During the 1960s space race between the United States and the Soviet Union, Dr. Wilhelm von Huber, a top NASA scientist, relocates to Cape Canaveral with his 12-year-old son, Billy. Their relationship has become strained in the wake of the recent death of Billy's mother, and the ever-widening gap between father and son has become obvious.

Billy finds his father boring. He wants to have an exciting life, and to be like the astronaut Alan Shepard.

However, Billy's life takes an exciting turn when he is hired by Dr. Donni McGuinness, the Director of Veterinary Sciences, to help train the chimpanzees for NASA space missions. Billy begins to develop a close bond with one particular chimpanzee named Mac. With Billy's help and companionship, Mac is chosen to become the first American astronaut launched into space.

All seems like a game until Billy realizes that his friend is being prepared to be put into orbit on a historical mission, and that someone at NASA is about to sabotage the mission. Mac's chance to explore space and put America ahead in the race to space can cost him his life.

== Cast ==
- James Woods as Dr. Wilhelm von Huber
- Annabeth Gish as Dr. Donni McGuinness
- Alex D. Linz as Wilhelm 'Billy' von Huber
- William Devane as Roger Thornhill
- William Atherton as Ralph Stanton
- Wesley Mann as Rudolph
- Mark Moses as Alan Shepard
- Tony Jay as Narrator

== Reception ==
Common Sense Media rated the film 3 out of 5 stars.

== See also ==
- Monkeys and apes in space
- Ham, the first chimpanzee in space
- Enos, the second chimpanzee in space and only one to orbit the Earth
