= Johnny Kapahala: Back on Board =

- DVD cover
- Written by: Annie DeYoung; Max Enscoe; Ann Knapp; Douglas Sloan
- Directed by: Eric Bross
- Starring: Brandon Baker; Robyn Lively; Mary Page Keller; Yuji Okumoto; Jake T. Austin; Cary Hiroyuki Tagawa
- Music by: Nathan Wang
- Country of origin: United States
- Original language: English

Production
- Producer: Tobin McLane
- Cinematography: Horacio Marquinez
- Editor: Terry Blythe
- Running time: 90 minutes
- Production companies: Rubicon Films, LTD; Utica Productions Inc.

Original release
- Network: Disney Channel
- Release: June 8, 2007

Related
- Johnny Tsunami

Johnny Kapahala: Back on Board is a 2007 American sports comedy-drama film released as a Disney Channel Original Movie. It is the sequel to Johnny Tsunami. The movie premiered on Disney Channel on June 8, 2007 with a U.S. viewership of 1.8 million viewers.

== Plot summary ==
Johnny "Pono" Kapahala, a seventeen-year-old snowboarding champion from Vermont, returns to Oahu, Hawaii, for the wedding of his grandfather, local surf legend Johnny Tsunami. Johnny is excited about the marriage as he anticipates having an uncle to hang out with, but he discovers his "Uncle Chris" is a 12-year-old brat.

The next day, Sam and Johnny catch Chris heading off with the Dirt Devils, a team of dirtboarders. They follow him to a barge set up with a skate park. Before Chris can skate, Johnny and Sam show him up by skating the barge. Annoyed, Chris runs away. When he gets home, he fights with Johnny and tells him to leave him alone. So, the next morning, Johnny goes surfing. He bumps into Valerie, a member of the Dirt Devils Chris has a crush on, and gives her a surfing lesson, which makes Chris jealous and upset. Forced to hang out with Chris, Johnny and Sam blackmail him into coming with them for a day. With Val, they go dirtboarding and ride ATVs. To his surprise, Chris has a good time, and he and Johnny finally start to get along.

The group heads out to a dirtboarding event to meet Akoni Kama and possible sponsors, but the Dirt Devils kick Val out of their group for hanging with Johnny and Chris, the "competition." Chris runs away from home again, and when Johnny and Sam find him, Chris is fighting with Jared, the leader of the Dirt Devils, on joining his group. Chris agrees to do a dangerous jump the next day during the rehearsal dinner for Carla and Johnny's wedding, which is also the night before the opening of the shop.

Carla decides to move back to Pennsylvania in a conversation with Johnny's grandpa, which Chris overhears. After getting some encouragement from Val, he feels guilty about causing their break-up, but doesn't know how to mend it. Johnny then says that Chris is lucky he has a smart nephew and eventually, with help from Val, Sam and Johnny fix the surf shop. They decide to stop hanging out with the Dirt Devils. The opening of Johnny's grandpa's store is a huge success, and even pro dirtboarder Akoni Kama comes. Meanwhile, across the street, the Dirt Devils find Troy in a heated argument with Val's dad over negotiations for him to move to California.

Johnny and Chris finally reach terms of friendship, and Chris helps Johnny with the race by describing the course set up by Val's father. The race begins with Troy in the lead for a large portion of the time, until the ending when he falls when doing one of three required tricks and crashes into the barrier at the finish line. Johnny wins, and Troy is arrested after the police find out he told Jared, who is released back into his parents' custody, to trash the shop. Carla and Johnny's Grandpa finally get married, and both families are finally happy.

== Cast ==
- Brandon Baker as Johnny "Pono" Kapahala
- Jake T. Austin as Chris, Carla's son and Johnny's paternal step-uncle
- Cary Hiroyuki Tagawa as Grandpa Johnny "Tsunami" Kapahala, Johnny's paternal grandfather
- Robyn Lively as Carla, Johnny's second wife and Johnny's paternal step-grandmother
- Mary Page Keller as Melanie Kapahala, Johnny's mother
- Yuji Okumoto as Pete Kapahala, Johnny's father
- Jonathan "Lil J" McDaniel as Sam Sterling, Johnny's best friend
- Andrew James Allen as Jared
- Rose McIver as Valerie "Val", Johnny's best friend
- Phil Brown as Troy
- Akoni Kama as himself
- Thomas Newman as Bo
- Fasitua Amosa as Officer
- William Wallace as Officer

== Mountainboarding ==
Mountainboarding stunts performed by:

- Akoni Kama
- Leon Robbins
- Kody Stewart
- Jarrad Cronin
- Ryan Slater
- Ben Toulmin
- Joe Lawry

== Production ==
The film was shot in New Zealand, at Studio West in West Auckland.

== Home media ==
The DVD was released on October 9, 2007.
