= The Cheetah Girls discography =

American girl group discography

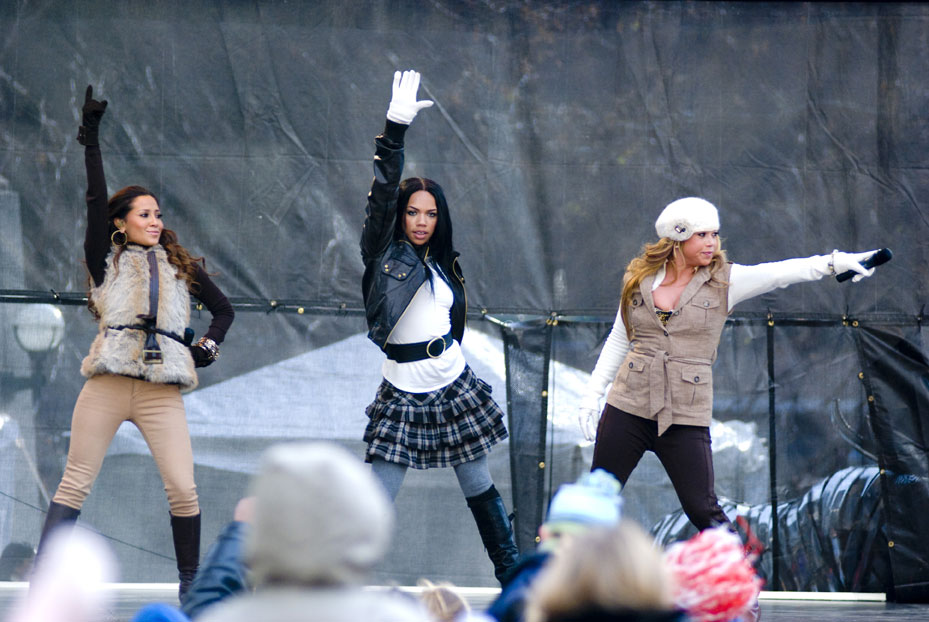
- The Cheetah Girls performing at The Magnificent Mile in 2008
- Studio albums: 2
- Extended plays: 2
- Soundtrack albums: 3
- Live albums: 1
- Singles: 10
- Music videos: 8

The discography of The Cheetah Girls, an American girl group, consists of two studio albums, fifteen singles and three soundtrack albums. They released their first soundtrack album, The Cheetah Girls on August 12, 2003. The album reached #33 on the US Billboard 200 and certified double platinum by the RIAA for shipments of over 2,000,000 copies. Following the release of the film and soundtrack, the girls decided to form a real recording group. Raven-Symoné opted not to join the group to focus on her solo career.

On October 11, 2005, the group released their first studio album, Cheetah-licious Christmas. In 2006, they released another soundtrack album, The Cheetah Girls 2. The band released their second studio album, TCG in September 2007. Their third and final soundtrack album, The Cheetah Girls: One World was released in August 2008.

== Albums ==
=== Studio albums ===
List of studio albums, with selected chart positions
Title	Album details	Peak chart positions	Sales
Title	Album details	US	Sales
Cheetah-licious Christmas	Release: October 11, 2005; Label: Walt Disney; Formats: CD, digital download	74	US: 376,000
TCG	Release: September 25, 2007; Label: Hollywood; Formats: CD, digital download	44	US: 126,000
"—" denotes releases that did not chart or were not released in that territory.

=== Live albums ===
List of studio albums, with selected chart positions
Title	Album details	Peak chart positions	Sales
Title	Album details	US Kid	Sales
In Concert: The Party's Just Begun Tour	Release: July 10, 2007; Formats: CD, digital download; Label: Walt Disney	12	US: 24,000
"—" denotes releases that did not chart or were not released in that territory.

=== Soundtracks ===
List of albums, with selected chart positions and certifications
Title	Album details	Peak chart positions				Certifications	Sales
Title	Album details	US	CAN	ITA	UK	Certifications	Sales
The Cheetah Girls	Released: August 12, 2003; Labels: Walt Disney; Formats: CD, digital download	33	—	29	—	RIAA: 2× Platinum	US: 2,000,000
The Cheetah Girls 2	Released: August 15, 2006; Labels: Walt Disney; Formats: CD, digital download	5	11	58	59	RIAA: Platinum; MC: Gold; BPI: Silver	US: 1,400,000
The Cheetah Girls: One World	Released: August 19, 2008; Labels: Walt Disney; Formats: CD, digital download	13	—	95	128	—	US: 140,000

=== Extended plays ===
Title	Album details
TCG EP	Released: September 25, 2007; Label: Hollywood; Formats: CD
The Cheetah Girls Soundcheck	Released: August 19, 2008; Label: Walt Disney, Wal-Mart; Formats: CD

=== Karaoke albums ===
Title	Album details
Disney's Karaoke Series - The Cheetah Girls	Released: February 3, 2004; Label: Walt Disney; Formats: CD
Disney's Karaoke Series - The Cheetah Girls 2	Released: October 10, 2006; Label: Walt Disney; Formats: CD
Disney's Karaoke Series - The Cheetah Girls: One World	Released: September 16, 2008; Label: Walt Disney; Formats: CD

== Singles ==
List of singles, with selected chart positions
Title	Year	Peak chart positions				Album
Title	Year	US	US Dance	NZ	UK	Album
"Cinderella"	2003	—	—	—	—	The Cheetah Girls
"Cheetah-licious Christmas"	2005	—	—	—	—	Cheetah-licious Christmas
"Shake a Tail Feather"	2005	—	—	—	—	Chicken Little
"If I Never Knew You"	2006	—	—	—	—	Disneymania 4
"The Party's Just Begun"	2006	85	—	13	53	The Cheetah Girls 2
"Strut"	2006	53	—	—	—	The Cheetah Girls 2
"Route 66"	2006	—	—	—	—	The Cheetah Girls 2
"So Bring It On"	2007	—	—	—	—	TCG
"Fuego"	2007	—^{[A]}	27	—	—	TCG
"One World"	2008	—	—	—	—	The Cheetah Girls: One World
"Cheetah Love"	2008	—	—	—	—	The Cheetah Girls: One World
"—" denotes a recording that did not chart or was not released in that country.

Notes

- ^{[A]} "Fuego" did not enter the Billboard Hot 100, but peaked at number 22 on the Bubbling Under Hot 100 Singles chart.

== Other charted songs ==
Song	Year	Peak chart positions		Album
Song	Year	US Bub.	US Pop 100	Album
"Step Up"	2006	6	84	The Cheetah Girls 2
"Amigas Cheetahs"	2006	10	87	The Cheetah Girls 2

== Music videos ==
Year	Music video	Director
2005
2005	"Cheetah-licious Christmas"	—N/a
2005	"Shake a Tail Feather"	—N/a
2006	"If I Never Knew You"	—N/a
2006	"Route 66"	—N/a
2007	"So This Is Love"	Shane Drake
2007	"Fuego"	Marcus Raboy

== Other album appearances ==
Year	Album	Compilation tracks
2005	DisneyMania 3	"I Won't Say (I'm in Love)"
2005	Disneyremixmania	"I Won't Say (I'm in Love)" (Grrl Power Remix)
2005	Radio Disney Jams 7	Cinderella
2005	Disney Girlz Rock	"Together We Can"
2005	Chicken Little	"Shake a Tail Feather"
2006	Radio Disney Jams 8	"Shake a Tail Feather"
2006	Radio Disney: Party Jams	"Shake a Tail Feather"
2006	DisneyMania 4	"If I Never Knew You"
2007	Radio Disney Jams 9	"Strut"
2007	The Very Best of Disney Channel	"The Party's Just Begun"
2007	DisneyMania 5	"So This is Love"
2007	Disney Channel Holiday	"Have Yourself a Merry Little Christmas"
2008	Radio Disney Jams 10	"So Bring It On"
2008	DisneyMania 6	"Someday My Prince Will Come"
2008	Disney Girlz Rock 2	"Fuego"
2008	Princess Disneymania	"So This is Love"
2009	Disney Channel Playlist	"Dance Me If You Can"
2013	Disney Classics	"Cheetah Sisters"
2016	Your Favorite Songs from 100 Disney Channel Original Movies	"Strut"
2024	Disney 2000s, Vol. 1	"Uh Oh" "So Bring It On"
