= The Party's Just Begun Tour =

2006–07 concert tour by the Cheetah Girls

- Tour by The Cheetah Girls
- Location: Canada; Puerto Rico; U.S.
- Associated album: The Cheetah Girls 2
- Start date: September 15, 2006
- End date: March 4, 2007
- No. of shows: 87

The Cheetah Girls concert chronology
- Cheetah-licious Christmas Tour (2005); The Party's Just Begun Tour (2006–07); One World Tour (2008)

The Party's Just Begun Tour was the second concert tour and first arena tour by American girl group the Cheetah Girls. It supported the soundtrack to their second film, The Cheetah Girls 2. The tour started on September 15, 2006, in Seattle and ended on March 4, 2007, in Houston. The concerts in Anaheim and San Diego were recorded and released as In Concert: The Party's Just Begun Tour.

== Background ==
The tour was originally going to be 40 cities across the United States, as stated by Sabrina Bryan on Live with Regis and Kelly, then 58 cities, but the final date transition was an 86 date tour mainly visiting the United States with the exception of a show in Puerto Rico and two cities in Canada. For the final date on the tour the Cheetah Girls performed at the Houston Livestock Show and Rodeo with Miley Cyrus as the opening act. The show sold 73,291 tickets, becoming one of the biggest concerts in the event's history.

The storyline of this show was that Dr. Coolcatz (played by Mitchel Musso) sends the girls on a mission to gather the ingredients for "growl power" – dreams, love, and friendship. The Cheetah Girls find the ingredients by singing and dancing to their crowds.

The setlist primarily includes songs from The Cheetah Girls 2 soundtrack as well as the first Cheetah Girls soundtrack. Also included was an exclusive track, "Falling for You", an unreleased song by Bailon and Williams' other girl group 3LW.

== Opening acts ==
- Miley Cyrus as Hannah Montana (September 15–October 15, 2006; March 4, 2007)
- Everlife (September 19–20; September 30; October 6; October 10; October 14–15; November 27–December 31, 2006; January 3–February 4, 2007)
- Jordan Pruitt (September 15–17; September 21–29, October 1–5; October 9; October 11–13; October 17–November 16, 2006)
- Vanessa Hudgens (October 17–November 16, 2006)
- Los Nēnēs (November 18, 2006)
- Angels (November 18, 2006)
- T-Squad (January 9–30, 2007)

== Setlist ==
Although not representative of all concerts for the duration of the tour, the average set list looked like this:

1. "The Party's Just Begun"
2. "Shake a Tail Feather"
3. "Together We Can"
4. "Route 66"
5. "If I Never Knew You"
6. "Girls Just Want to Have Fun"
7. "Cheetah-licious"
8. "Strut"
9. "I Won't Say (I'm in Love)"
10. "Falling for You"
11. "Cinderella"
12. "Step Up"
13. "Girl Power"
14. "Cheetah Sisters"
15. "Cheetah-licious Christmas"
16. "Amigas Cheetahs"

== Tour dates ==
List of 2006 concerts
Date (2006)	City	Country	Venue	Attendance	Revenue
September 15	Seattle	United States	KeyArena	—N/a	—N/a
September 17	Portland	United States	Memorial Coliseum	—N/a	—N/a
September 19	San Jose	United States	HP Pavilion	—N/a	—N/a
September 20	Stockton	United States	Stockton Arena	—N/a	—N/a
September 21	Los Angeles	United States	Gibson Amphitheatre	—N/a	—N/a
September 22	Fresno	United States	Save Mart Center	—N/a	—N/a
September 24	Phoenix	United States	Dodge Theatre	—N/a	—N/a
September 26	Denver	United States	The Lecture Hall	5,028 / 5,028	$180,078
September 29	Rosemont	United States	Allstate Arena	14,067 / 14,067	$518,054
September 30	Moline	United States	The MARK of the Quad Cities	11,081 / 11,100	$385,000
October 1	St. Louis (Note: This date had two showings, an afternoon and an evening show.)	United States	Fox Theatre	8,203 / 8,203	$326,743
October 4	Grand Prairie	United States	Nokia Live at Grand Prairie	6,061 / 6,061	$219,350
October 5	San Antonio	United States	AT&T Center	11,612 / 11,612	$375,192
October 6	Houston	United States	Reliant Arena	7,170 / 7,170	$262,445
October 7	Lafayette	United States	Cajundome	10,037 / 10,037	$376,842
October 9	Jacksonville	United States	Jacksonville Veterans Memorial Arena	5,953 / 5,998	$209,801
October 10	Sunrise	United States	BankAtlantic Center	10,328 / 10,328	$345,196
October 11	Tampa	United States	St. Pete Times Forum	7,586 / 7,708	$272,107
October 13	Duluth	United States	Arena at Gwinnett Center	10,940 / 10,940	$432,746
October 14	Charlotte	United States	Cricket Arena	9,016 / 9,098	$313,956
October 15	Norfolk	United States	Constant Convocation Center	6,845 / 6,856	$237,933
October 17	Washington, D.C.	United States	DAR Constitution Hall	6,730 / 6,894 (Note: The score data is combined from the shows held at the DAR Constitution Hall on October 17 and 25, 2006.)	$258,495
October 18	Hartford	United States	Hartford Civic Center	8,276 / 8,376	$283,722
October 20	Uniondale	United States	Nassau Coliseum	13,632 / 13,720	$490,321
October 21	East Rutherford	United States	Continental Airlines Arena	9,314 / 9,314	$359,878
October 22	Hershey	United States	Giant Center	6,250 / 6,432	$228,295
October 24	Albany	United States	Pepsi Arena	6,940 / 7,722	$253,220
October 25	Washington, D.C.	United States	DAR Constitution Hall		
October 26	Syracuse	United States	War Memorial at Oncenter	5,383 / 6,112	$193,519
October 28	Rochester	United States	Blue Cross Arena	7,852 / 7,932	$275,464
October 29	Providence	United States	Dunkin' Donuts Center	7,629 / 7,748	$272,456
October 30	Wilkes-Barre	United States	Wachovia Arena at Casey Plaza	6,486 / 6,735	$236,337
November 1	Worcester	United States	DCU Center	10,018 / 10,659	$356,551
November 3	Bridgeport	United States	Arena at Harbor Yard	—N/a	—N/a
November 4	Reading	United States	Sovereign Center	7,393 / 7,406	$260,546
November 5	Philadelphia	United States	Wachovia Spectrum	9,382 / 9,754	$361,598
November 8	Cleveland	United States	Wolstein Center	7,031 / 7,073	$247,024
November 9	Columbus	United States	Nationwide Arena	11,012 / 11,113	$370,824
November 10	Detroit	United States	Masonic Temple Theatre	4,254 / 4,254	$159,313
November 12	Omaha	United States	Qwest Center	9,126 / 9,299	$315,447
November 14	Milwaukee	United States	Milwaukee Theatre	3,738 / 3,738	$134,493
November 15	Saint Paul	United States	Xcel Energy Center	9,324 / 9,397	$315,488
November 16	Des Moines	United States	Wells Fargo Arena	6,400 / 7,000	$240,070
November 18	San Juan	Puerto Rico	Coliseo de Puerto Rico	—N/a	—N/a
November 27	Tulsa	United States	Tulsa Convention Center	4,238 / 6,597	$156,353
November 29	Corpus Christi	United States	American Bank Center Arena	8,743 / 8,743	$311,889
November 30	Hidalgo	United States	Dodge Arena	6,000 / 6,000	$252,640
December 2	North Little Rock	United States	Alltel Arena	15,319 / 15,319	$498,911
December 3	Bossier City	United States	CenturyTel Center	12,272 / 12,272	$412,620
December 5	Memphis	United States	FedExForum	10,056 / 10,056	$334,176
December 6	Nashville	United States	Gaylord Entertainment Center	11,684 / 11,684	$390,204
December 8	Evansville	United States	Roberts Municipal Stadium	8,271 / 8,271	$302,513
December 9	Cincinnati	United States	U.S. Bank Arena	9,370 / 9,370	$346,735
December 11	Grand Rapids	United States	Van Andel Arena	10,964 / 11,560	$370,368
December 12	London	Canada	John Labatt Centre	3,577 / 5,714	$126,511
December 13	Toronto	Canada	Air Canada Centre	7,199 / 8,170	$245,381
December 15	Manchester	United States	Verizon Wireless Arena	9,370 / 9,370	$346,735
December 16	Atlantic City	United States	Boardwalk Hall	9,807 / 9,807	$396,032
December 17	Pittsburgh	United States	Mellon Arena	9,403 / 9,403	$342,159
December 19	Trenton	United States	Sovereign Bank Arena	7,891 / 7,891	$286,225
December 20	Bridgeport	United States	Arena at Harbor Yard	8,519 / 8,519	$309,951
December 21	Uniondale	United States	Nassau Coliseum	13,542 / 13,542	$486,847
December 29	North Charleston	United States	North Charleston Coliseum	9,581 / 9,581	$319,599
December 30	Greenville	United States	BI-LO Center	11,531 / 11,531	$402,105
December 31	Duluth	United States	Arena at Gwinnett Center	11,149 / 11,149	$447,523

List of 2007 concerts
Date (2007)	City	Country	Venue	Attendance	Revenue
January 3	Grand Prairie	United States	Nokia Live at Grand Prairie	6,200 / 6,200	$224,860
January 5	Austin	United States	Frank Erwin Center	11,891 / 11,891	$418,945
January 6	Laredo	United States	Laredo Entertainment Center	8,352 / 8,352	$300,174
January 7	San Antonio	United States	AT&T Center	11,918 / 11,918	$385,783
January 9	El Paso	United States	Don Haskins Center	8,110 / 8,110	$303,605
January 12	Anaheim	United States	Honda Center	12,549 / 12,549	$512,675
January 13	San Diego	United States	iPayOne Center	11,629 / 11,629	$415,146
January 14	Las Vegas	United States	Thomas & Mack Center	9,497 / 9,497	$332,152
January 15	Salt Lake City	United States	Nu Skin Theater	6,825 / 6,825	$262,268
January 17	Denver	United States	Wells Fargo Theatre	4,343 / 4,705	$162,859
January 20	Green Bay	United States	Resch Center	6,817 / 7,863	$253,722
January 21	Peoria	United States	Carver Arena	7,463 / 9,256	$269,169
January 22	Lexington	United States	Rupp Arena	8,909 / 9,338	$329,896
January 23	Knoxville	United States	Thompson–Boling Arena	11,805 / 12,912	$408,778
January 25	Lafayette	United States	Cajundome	9,911 / 10,312	$370,825
January 26	Grand Prairie	United States	Nokia Live at Grand Prairie	6,272 / 6,272	$227,624
January 28	Glendale	United States	Jobing.com Arena	11,612 / 12,082	$414,284
January 30	Bakersfield	United States	Rabobank Arena	6,728 / 8,720	$248,136
February 3	Honolulu	United States	Blaisdell Arena	13,348 / 13,673	$506,071
February 4	Honolulu	United States	Blaisdell Arena	13,348 / 13,673	$506,071
March 4^{[A]}	Houston	United States	Reliant Stadium	—N/a	—N/a
Total				621,652 / 671,483 (93%)	$23,500,953

Festivals and other miscellaneous performances
^{A} Houston Livestock Show and Rodeo
