= In Concert: The Party's Just Begun Tour =

Live album by The Cheetah Girls
- Released: July 10, 2007
- Recorded: January 12–13, 2007; Anaheim, Honda Center; San Diego, iPay One Center
- Genre: Dance-pop; R&B
- Length: 42:03
- Label: Walt Disney Records
- Producer: Fred Mollin

The Cheetah Girls chronology
The Cheetah Girls 2 (2006)	In Concert: The Party's Just Begun Tour (2007)	TCG (2007)

Professional ratings
Review scores
Source	Rating
AllMusic	3/5 stars

In Concert: The Party's Just Begun Tour is a live album from The Cheetah Girls. It was released on July 10, 2007. This album is the group's first live album, recorded during two of the group's The Party's Just Begun Tour dates.

== Information ==
The Cheetah Girls recorded songs live at two live concert performances in California. The CD was released along with a DVD featuring highlights of the concert. The new original motion picture soundtrack with a CD/DVD combo was released on June 26, 2007.

The CD includes songs from The Cheetah Girls 2 soundtrack as well as the first Cheetah Girls soundtrack. The song "Shake a Tail Feather", from the Chicken Little soundtrack and the group's rendition of "Route 66" is also included on the CD. Also included is an exclusive track, "Falling for You", which is a cover of an unreleased song by Bailon and Williams' other girl group 3LW. It is also stated in the booklet to this record that the album is dedicated to the memory of Ray Cham, who wrote the song "Girl Power".

The track listing for the album includes the song "Dance with Me", which was used in The Cheetah Girls 2 movie, but this song is performed by Drew Seeley and Belinda and not by The Cheetah Girls. The song was used on the tour however, for a dance routine.

The DVD portion of the release includes a "Meet the Cheetahs" bonus feature.

== Track listing ==
Disc 1 (Audio CD)

No.	Title	Length
1.	"The Party's Just Begun"	04:33
2.	"Shake a Tail Feather"	03:13
3.	"Together We Can"	01:40
4.	"Route 66"	03:06
5.	"Strut"	04:00
6.	"Falling for You"	04:16
7.	"Cinderella"	03:31
8.	"Dance with Me"	01:55
9.	"Step Up"	04:25
10.	"Growl Power"	03:24
11.	"Cheetah Sisters"	02:49
12.	"Amigas Cheetahs"	05:21
Total length:		42:03

Disc 2 (Concert DVD)

1. "The Party's Just Begun" (live)
2. "Strut" (live)
3. "Step Up" (live)
4. "Dance with Me" (live)
5. "Growl Power" (live)
6. "Cheetah Sisters" (live)
7. "Amigas Cheetahs" (live)
8. "Meet the Cheetahs" (bonus track)
9. Bonus 12 minute interview

== Charts ==
Chart (2007)	Peak position
U.S. Top Kid Audio	12
