= The Cheetah Girls Soundcheck =

EP by the Cheetah Girls
- Released: August 19, 2008
- Recorded: July 2008
- Genre: Pop
- Length: 16:49
- Label: Walt Disney; Wal-Mart

The Cheetah Girls chronology
The Cheetah Girls: One World (2008)	The Cheetah Girls Soundcheck (2008)	The Cheetah Girls: Next Gen (2027)

The Cheetah Girls Soundcheck is the second EP by the Cheetah Girls available only at Wal-Mart as a digital download-exclusive release as a part of the Soundcheck series. The video performances of the tracks were released on July 16, 2008. The EP includes one song from The Cheetah Girls 2, one song from their studio album TCG and three songs from The Cheetah Girls: One World. The EP was released on August 19, 2008, the same day as the One World soundtrack. This is the Cheetah Girls' second album to feature live vocals, the first being In Concert: The Party's Just Begun Tour.

== Track listing ==
No.	Title	Length
1.	"Strut"	3:27
2.	"One World"	2:46
3.	"Cheetah Love"	3:20
4.	"Break Out This Box"	3:38
5.	"Dance Me If You Can"	3:24
