= Dance with Me (Drew Seeley song) =

"Dance With Me"

Single by Drew Seeley featuring Belinda

from the album DS and The Cheetah Girls 2 (soundtrack)
- Released: September 2, 2006
- Recorded: 2006
- Genre: Latin pop
- Length: 3:12
- Label: Walt Disney Records
- Songwriters: Ray Cham, Charlene Licera
- Producer: Ray "Sol Survivor" Cham

Drew Seeley singles chronology
"Get'cha Head in the Game" (2006)	"Dance With Me" (2006)	"I'm Ready (Remix)" (2007)

Belinda singles chronology
"Amigas Cheetahs" (2006)	"Dance With Me" (2006)	"Ni Freud ni tu mamá" (2006)

Music video
- "Dance With Me" on YouTube

"Dance With Me" is a song performed by Canadian singer Drew Seeley featuring the vocals of Mexican singer Belinda. The song was written by Ray Cham and Charlene Licera, and produced by Cham as Ray "Sol Survivor" Cham. It was released on September 2, 2006 from Seeley debut album DS and the soundtrack of The Cheetah Girls 2.

== Composition ==
The song was written by Ray Cham and Charlene Licera, and produced by Cham as Ray "Sol Survivor" Cham. The song is part of the original soundtrack The Cheetah Girls 2, from the film of the same name. Also the song appears on the Drew Seeley's online album, Drew Seeley, and the karaoke version appears on Disney's Karaoke Series: The Cheetah Girls 2.

== Track listing ==
- CD single
1. "Dance with Me" (featuring Belinda) – 3:12

== Music video ==
The music video was producer and directed by Christopher Erskin. It shows Drew Seeley and Belinda singing the song and dancing with their friends on a club, it also features clips from the movie. The Belinda's official website announced that the video premiere was on November 9, 2006 on the Disney Channel, but the date switched to November 10. However during commercial breaks it features only Drew singing and Belinda does not appear while her vocals were replaced with speaking sounds from the movie over scenes. The video was included on the DVD of the film.

== Live performance ==
In 2006, Seeley sang the song on the High School Musical Tour, with background vocals by Belinda and screens showing the video. The song was used on the Party's Just Begun Tour by The Cheetah Girls, as part of the interval dance, where Sabrina Bryan and a dancer performed their own choreography. This performance was included on the live album In Concert: The Party's Just Begun Tour.

== Charts ==
Chart (2006)	Peak position
US Billboard Bubbling Under Hot 100 Singles	20
