= List of The Cheetah Girls concert tours =

The following is a list of concert tours given by The Cheetah Girls.

== Cheetah-licious Christmas Tour ==
Cheetah-licious Christmas Tour
- Tour by The Cheetah Girls
- Associated album: Cheetah-licious Christmas
- Start date: December 6, 2005
- End date: December 28, 2005
- No. of shows: 17

The Cheetah Girls concert chronology
- Cheetah-licious Christmas Tour (2005); The Party's Just Begun Tour (2006–07)

In late 2005, The Cheetah Girls went on tour to support their Christmas album, Cheetah-licious Christmas. Aly & AJ went along with them, as the opening act, to support their own album Into the Rush. The Jonas Brothers also performed as surprise guests for a total of 10 shows of the tour, promoting their debut album It's About Time. The holiday theme of the concert included giant presents (in which the Cheetah Girls performed in), winter clothes, and even a tropical theme for their song "Christmas in California", which included surf boards with the girls' names on them. The Cheetah Girls also sang songs from the first Cheetah Girls movie soundtrack, the cover of "I Won't Say (I'm in Love)" (from DisneyMania 3), and their version of "Shake a Tail Feather" (from the Chicken Little soundtrack).

=== Opening acts ===
- Aly & AJ
- Jonas Brothers (December 6–17, 2005)

=== Setlist ===
1. "Cheetah-licious Christmas"
2. "Five More Days 'til Christmas"
3. "A Marshmallow World"
4. "Santa Claus Is Coming to Town"
5. "Perfect Christmas"
6. "Cinderella"
7. "Shake a Tail Feather"
8. "Christmas in California"
9. "Together We Can"
10. "Girl Power"
11. "Cheetah Sisters"
12. "No Ordinary Holiday"
13. "All I Want for Christmas Is You"
14. "The Simple Things"
15. "This Christmas"
16. "I Saw Mommy Kissing Santa Claus"
17. "Last Christmas"
18. "I Won't Say (I'm in Love)"
19. "Feliz Navidad"

=== Tour dates ===
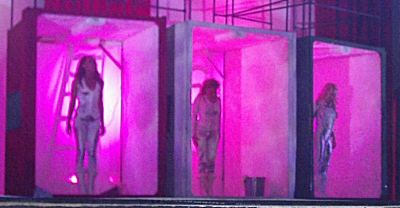
The Cheetah Girls performing during the tour.

Date	City (All U.S.)	Venue
December 6, 2005	Newark	Prudential Hall
December 7, 2005	Syracuse	Landmark Theatre
December 9, 2005	Albany	Palace Theatre
December 10, 2005	Providence	Providence Performing Arts Center
December 11, 2005	Reading	Sovereign Performing Arts Center
December 13, 2005	Boston	Orpheum Theatre
December 14, 2005	Philadelphia	Verizon Hall
December 15, 2005	Wallingford	Chevrolet Theatre
December 17, 2005	New York City	Nokia Theatre Times Square; Two shows
December 18, 2005	Norfolk	Prism Theatre
December 19, 2005	Greensboro	War Memorial Auditorium
December 20, 2005	Duluth	Arena at Gwinnett Center
December 22, 2005	Houston	Jones Hall for the Performing Arts
December 23, 2005	Grand Prairie	Nokia Live at Grand Prairie
December 27, 2005	Los Angeles	Gibson Amphitheatre
December 28, 2005	San Francisco	Nob Hill Masonic Center

== One World Tour ==
One World Tour
- Tour by The Cheetah Girls
- Associated album: The Cheetah Girls: One World
- Start date: October 4, 2008
- End date: December 21, 2008
- Legs: 1
- No. of shows: 46

The Cheetah Girls concert chronology
- The Party's Just Begun Tour (2006–07); One World Tour (2008)

The One World Tour is the final concert tour by the American group, The Cheetah Girls. It supports the soundtrack to their third film, The Cheetah Girls: One World. The tour played over 40 concerts in the United States and Canada. At most shows, the stage was placed in the middle of the floor, which created a theater-like environment.

=== Background ===
The tour was announced on August 12, 2008, ten days before the premiere of their final film, The Cheetah Girls: One World. The tour was originally set to begin in Austin, Texas, but a rehearsal show was added in Corpus Christi, Texas. The concert benefited the Corpus Christi Independent School District. Midway through the tour, it was plagued with controversy as band member Adrienne Bailon had explicit photos leaked online. Bailon stated that the photos were stolen from her laptop, at the JFK Airport. Backlash ensued with a few tour dates being cancelled, including a performance at the Macy's Thanksgiving Day Parade. American publication Us Weekly later reported the act was a publicity stunt to break Bailon from the typical Disney star image.

=== Opening acts ===
- Clique Girlz
- 535 (select shows)
- KSM

=== Set list ===
Act 1

1. "Intro"
2. "Cheetah Love"
3. "So Bring It On"
4. "Dig a Little Deeper"

Act 2

5. "Feels Like Love"
6. "Strut"

Act 3

7. "Cinderella"
8. "What If" (performed by Adrienne Bailon)

Act 4

9. "Girl Power"
10. "Break Out This Box"
11. "Dance Me If You Can"
12. "No Place Like Us"

Act 5

13. "The Party's Just Begun"
14. "Crazy on the Dance Floor" (solo performed by Sabrina Bryan)
15. "Fuego"
16. "Homesick"

Act 6

17. "Commander Kiely" (performed by Kiely Williams)
18. "Shake a Tail Feather" (from Chicken Little soundtrack)
19. "Route 66"

Encore

20. "One World"

=== Tour dates ===
Date	City	Country	Venue
October 4, 2008	Corpus Christi	United States	American Bank Center Arena
October 8, 2008	Austin	United States	Frank Erwin Center
October 10, 2008	Lafayette	United States	Cajundome
October 11, 2008	Bossier City	United States	CenturyTel Center
October 12, 2008	Biloxi	United States	Mississippi Coast Coliseum
October 15, 2008	Nashville	United States	Sommet Center
October 17, 2008	Tupelo	United States	BancorpSouth Arena
October 18, 2008	North Little Rock	United States	Alltel Arena
October 20, 2008	Dallas	United States	American Airlines Center
October 21, 2008	San Antonio	United States	AT&T Center
October 24, 2008	Jacksonville	United States	Jacksonville Veterans Memorial Arena
October 25, 2008	Miami	United States	American Airlines Arena
October 26, 2008	Orlando	United States	Amway Arena
October 28, 2008	Greenville	United States	BI-LO Center
October 30, 2008	Duluth	United States	Arena at Gwinnett Center
November 1, 2008	Knoxville	United States	Thompson–Boling Arena
November 2, 2008	Greensboro	United States	Greensboro Coliseum
November 5, 2008	Baltimore	United States	1st Mariner Arena
November 6, 2008	Richmond	United States	Richmond Coliseum
November 8, 2008	Atlantic City	United States	Boardwalk Hall
November 9, 2008	Washington, D.C.	United States	Verizon Center
November 11, 2008	Philadelphia	United States	Spectrum Theater
November 13, 2008	Newark	United States	Prudential Center
November 14, 2008	Uniondale	United States	Nassau Veterans Memorial Coliseum
November 16, 2008	Manchester	United States	Verizon Wireless Arena
November 17, 2008	Worcester	United States	DCU Center
November 18, 2008	Hartford	United States	XL Center
November 20, 2008	Toronto	Canada	Air Canada Centre
November 21, 2008	Cleveland	United States	Wolstein Center
November 23, 2008	Cincinnati	United States	U.S. Bank Arena
November 26, 2008	Pittsburgh	United States	Petersen Events Center
November 28, 2008	Columbus	United States	Nationwide Arena
November 29, 2008	Lexington	United States	Rupp Arena
December 2, 2008	Auburn Hills	United States	The Palace of Auburn Hills
December 4, 2008	Chicago	United States	United Center
December 5, 2008	Milwaukee	United States	U.S. Cellular Arena
December 6, 2008	Moline	United States	iWireless Center
December 7, 2008	St. Louis	United States	Scottrade Center
December 9, 2008	Kansas City	United States	Sprint Center
December 11, 2008	Minneapolis	United States	Target Center
December 12, 2008	Omaha	United States	Qwest Center Arena
December 15, 2008	West Valley City	United States	E Center
December 17, 2008	Oakland	United States	Oracle Arena
December 19, 2008	Glendale	United States	Jobing.com Arena
December 20, 2008	Anaheim	United States	Honda Center
December 21, 2008	San Diego	United States	San Diego Sports Arena

Cancellations and rescheduled shows

October 14, 2008	Memphis	FedExForum	Cancelled
October 22, 2008	Houston	Toyota Center	Cancelled
October 29, 2008	Charlotte	Time Warner Cable Arena	Cancelled
November 25, 2008	Rochester	Blue Cross Arena	Cancelled
November 30, 2008	Indianapolis	Conseco Fieldhouse	Cancelled

=== Box office score data ===
Venue	City	Tickets sold / available	Gross revenue
Frank Erwin Center	Austin	3,549 / 4,660 (76%)	$157,715
The Cajundome	Lafayette	5,674 / 8,503 (67%)	$250,401
CenturyTel Center	Bossier City	3,311 / 4,771 (69%)	$147,184
Mississippi Coast Coliseum	Biloxi	6,891 / 7,473 (92%)	$305,918
Sommet Center	Nashville	3,825 / 5,326 (72%)	$169,373
BancorpSouth Center	Tupelo	4,432 / 8,283 (53%)	$192,750
Alltel Arena	North Little Rock	4,955 / 6,116 (81%)	$218,333
American Airlines Center	Dallas	5,253 / 6,500 (81%)	$233,835
AT&T Center	San Antonio	3,250 / 4,837 (67%)	$146,636
Jacksonville Veterans Memorial Arena	Jacksonville	4,330 / 5,449 (79%)	$193,505
American Airlines Arena	Miami	8,742 / 11,117 (79%)	$380,918
Amway Arena	Orlando	5,134 / 6,931 (74%)	$232,124
BI-LO Center	Greenville	3,302 / 4,289 (77%)	$313,956
Arena at Gwinnett Center	Duluth	5,071 / 6,376 (79%)	$222,880
Thompson–Boling Arena	Knoxville	3,823 / 7,524 (51%)	$166,005
Greensboro Coliseum	Greensboro	3,751 / 5,414 (69%)	$166,909
1st Mariner Arena	Baltimore	3,666 / 6,545 (56%)	$162,544
Richmond Coliseum	Richmond	3,071 / 5,880 (52%)	$137,089
Boardwalk Hall	Atlantic City	5,700 / 6,417 (89%)	$254,427
Verizon Center	Washington, D.C.	7,902 / 8,493 (93%)	$348,580
Spectrum Theater	Philadelphia	3,805 / 4,739 (80%)	$169,415
Prudential Center	Newark	7,343 / 8,825 (83%)	$328,706
Nassau Veterans Memorial Coliseum	Uniondale	9,350 / 10,966 (85%)	$394,098
Verizon Wireless Arena	Manchester	4,873 / 6,977 (70%)	$217,397
XL Center	Hartford	3,722 / 5,604 (66%)	$167,734
Air Canada Centre	Toronto	6,226 / 7,219 (86%)	$237,207
Wolstein Center	Cleveland	3,815 / 4,186 (91%)	$168,630
U.S. Bank Arena	Cincinnati	2,625 / 3,818 (69%)	$116,765
Petersen Events Center	Pittsburgh	2,642 / 3,406 (78%)	$119,248
Nationwide Arena	Columbus	3,343 / 5,329 (63%)	$146,091
Rupp Arena	Lexington	4,832 / 6,206 (78%)	$214,822
The Palace of Auburn Hills	Auburn Hills	4,475 / 4,788 (93%)	$201,138
United Center	Chicago	6,439 / 7,177 (90%)	$286,554
U.S. Cellular Arena	Milwaukee	3,179 / 5,776 (55%)	$142,241
iWireless Center	Moline	4,264 / 7,627 (56%)	$187,923
Scottrade Center	St. Louis	3,300 / 5,197 (63%)	$144,290
Sprint Center	Kansas City	4,371 / 6,603 (66%)	$176,966
Target Center	Minneapolis	3,213 / 4,447 (72%)	$142,502
Qwest Center	Omaha	5,104 / 5,907 (86%)	$228,475
Oracle Arena	Oakland	5,355 / 6,232 (86%)	$241,182
Jobing.com Arena	Glendale	3,656 / 4,777 (77%)	$162,340
Honda Center	Anaheim	6,089 / 9,247 (66%)	$273,467
San Diego Sports Arena	San Diego	4,063 / 5,385 (75%)	$180,357
TOTAL		196,042 / 271,342 (72%)	$9,048,630
