= TCG (album) =

2007 album by the Cheetah Girls

Studio album by the Cheetah Girls
- Released: September 25, 2007
- Recorded: 2006–2007
- Genres: Pop; R&B
- Length: 38:06 (Standard edition); 41:35 (Target edition)
- Label: Hollywood
- Producers: J.R. Rotem; Antonina Armato; Leah Haywood; Daniel James; Tim James; Steve Lunt; Matthew Gerrard; David Norland; Kristal "Tytewriter" Oliver; RedOne; Soul Nana & Toka

The Cheetah Girls chronology
In Concert: The Party's Just Begun Tour (2007)	TCG (2007)	The Cheetah Girls: One World (2008)

Singles from TCG
- 1. "So Bring It On" Released: August 25, 2007; 2. "Fuego" Released: September 15, 2007

TCG (short for "The Cheetah Girls") is the second and final studio album by the Cheetah Girls. The album was released on Hollywood Records on September 25, 2007. The album debuted at number 44 on the Billboard 200 albums chart with 19,000 copies sold in its first week. It has sold 126,000 copies to date.

Critics gave the album mixed to positive reviews, who while complimenting the girls' vocal performances, felt the album was "safe" and didn't push any boundaries. It was supplemented by the singles "So Bring It On" and "Fuego".

== Background ==
The girls originally began working on the album in January 2006. However, when production began for The Cheetah Girls 2 and its accompanying soundtrack, the album was put on hold at the time. Much of the album was recorded during The Party's Just Begun Tour which began in September and ended in March 2007.

Group member Adrienne Bailon was quoted as saying: "We'll be making a real studio album, not a soundtrack. It's important for people to see us as a real musical group. We have all this great marketing around us, with the movies and other things. But we are a musical group". She also added that the soundtracks and Christmas album "don't count".

Group member Sabrina Bryan was interviewed by Billboard magazine and said that the group was eager to showcase a more mature sound to gather an audience of older fans while keeping the lyrics clean for the younger fanbase as well. She also said that the group would work with some of the producers that they had previously worked with, while also exploring new producers as well. They also announced that they'd be releasing the album via Hollywood Records rather than Walt Disney Records, which was the record labels used to release the group's soundtrack albums, their holiday album Cheetah-licious Christmas, and their live album In Concert: The Party's Just Begun Tour.

Group member Kiely Williams, describing the album, stated that "it's like the first look at the Cheetah Girls apart from our roles in the show. ... Just Sabrina, Adrienne and Kiely kind of saying what we feel ... We actually co-produced and wrote a good portion of the album". She also confirmed that this album will be "a little bit more mature than what the fans are used to". She also described the music on the album as a blend of hip-hop and R&B. The famous classical piece "Ode to Joy" was also used in the motif of the track titled "Human", which was co-written and co-arranged by award-winning vocalist Jade Valerie Villalon from Sweetbox.

In an interview with Radio Disney about the album, the group commented that some leftover tracks would be used on the One World soundtrack.

== Singles ==
"So Bring It On" was released as the album's first single on August 25, 2007. The song was the theme of Twitches Too.

"Fuego" was released as the album's second single on September 15, 2007. On their official MySpace profile, the girls described the song as a "party anthem" with "Latin influences" and a sample of Lionel Richie's '80s hit single "All Night Long (All Night)". It peaked at #27 on Billboard's Hot Dance Club Play chart.

== Critical reception ==
Professional ratings
Review scores
Source	Rating
Allmusic	3/5 stars
Common Sense Media	3/5 stars

Marisa Brown of Allmusic gave the album three out of five stars: "Despite her appearance in the 2006 film Cheetah Girls 2, Raven-Symoné is nowhere to be found on the group's third studio album, TCG (nor was she on their live CD/DVD, In Concert: The Party's Just Begun Tour, released earlier in 2007), which is actually their first actual record, the first two being soundtracks to the accompanying Cheetah Girls films. That being said, the trio doesn't seem to have too much of a problem continuing its brand of super-produced, hook-driven suburban pop that's been thrilling Disney Channel viewers since 2003, and there's not much to distinguish TCG from any of the Girls' other releases. Which shouldn't bother fans too much, anyway, as most are probably looking for this same kind of strong, catchy radio-friendly music in the first place. TCG doesn't push any boundaries, but that's not what it's trying to do, anyway, which means that fans of theirs should be pleased with the results".

Kathi Kamen Goldmark of Common Sense Media also gave the album three out of five stars, though gave a more mixed review. She wrote: "Though parents may be grateful for any CD that isn't filled with sexist posturing, and first graders will enjoy the clearly audible lyrics and danceable beats (Spanish-infused "Fuego"), there's a manufactured quality throughout that prevents three young women with obvious talent from strutting any real stuff. In other words, the Cheetah Girls get down on TCG, but not that far".

== Track listing ==
No.	Title	Writer(s)	Producer(s)	Length
1.	"Fuego"	Jonathan Rotem; E. Kidd Bogart; Lionel Richie; Élan Rivera	J.R. Rotem	3:28
2.	"Uh Oh"	Daniel James; Leah Haywood; Shelly Peiken; Sabrina Bryan; Adrienne Bailon; Kiely Williams	Dreamlab	3:15
3.	"Human"	Matthew Gerrard; Jade Valerie; Kara DioGuardi	Matthew Gerrard	3:54
4.	"So Bring It On"	David Norland; Luther Rabb; Peiken; Haywood	David Norland	3:00
5.	"Break Out This Box"	Theron Feemster; Earnest Dixon; J.C. Chasez; Courtney Harrell; Claude Kelly; Bryan; Bailon; Williams	NEFF-U; Good Energy	3:51
6.	"Crash"	Nadir Khayat; Kristal Oliver; Steve Lunt	RedOne	3:36
7.	"Do No Wrong"	Rotem; Bogart; Makeba Riddick	J.R. Rotem	3:26
8.	"All In Me"	Andrew Bojanic; Elyssa James; Elizabeth Hooper	Wizards Of Oz	3:28
9.	"Off The Wall"	Hooper; Bojanic; Emmanuel Obeng; Tsuyoshi Takayanagi; Bryan; Bailon; Williams	Wizards Of Oz; Tsuyoshi Takayanagi; Soul NaNa	3:48
10.	"Who We Are"	Kevin Kadish; Angie Aparo	J.R. Rotem	3:04
11.	"Homesick"	Williams	Rock Mafia	3:29

Target exclusive bonus track
No.	Title	Writer(s)	Producer(s)	Length
12.	"How A Girl Feels"	Scott Spock; Graham Edwards; Lauren Christy; Bryan; Bailon; Williams	The Matrix	3:29
Total length:				41:35

== Wal-Mart bonus EP ==
TCG EP

EP by the Cheetah Girls
- Released: September 25, 2007
- Genres: Latin pop; R&B
- Length: 20:18
- Labels: Hollywood; Wal-Mart

Wal-Mart had a limited time exclusive-edition with a bonus disc of five songs, two of which are Spanish versions of songs that appear on the regular album.

No.	Title	Length
1.	"I Wanna Know You Like That"	3:53
2.	"On My Way"	3:54
3.	"Fuego (Spanish version)"	3:28
4.	"Off the Wall (Spanish version)"	3:48
5.	"So Bring It On (Remix)"	5:15

== Personnel ==
All vocals by the Cheetah Girls (Adrienne Bailon, Sabrina Bryan, Kiely Williams)

Additional musicians

- Guitar – Bob Horn, Kevin Kadish, Paul Palmer, and Tim Pierce
- Keyboards – Ron "Neff U" Feemster
- Bass – Ron "Neff U" Feemster

Production

- Executive producer: Jon Lind, Mio Vukovic, Melissa Wiechmann, Tse Williams
- Producers: Antonina Armato, Matthew Gerrard, Leah Haywood, Daniel James, Tim James, Steve Lunt, David Norland, RedOne, Jonathan "J.R." Rotem, Soul Nana & Toka
- Vocal producer: Bishop "Young Don" Dixon, Courtney Harrell, Leah Haywood, Daniel James and Claude Kelly
- Mastering: Chris Gehringer
- Engineers: William Durst, Bob Horn, Nigel Lundemo, John D. Norten, Greg Ogan, RedOne
- Vocal engineer: Phil Margaziotis
- A&R: Jon Lind, Mio Vukovic
- Photography: Brian Bowen Smith
- Art direction & design: Jolie Clemens, Emily Frye

== Charts ==
Chart (2007)	Peak position	Sales
U.S. Billboard 200	44	126,000 (sales to date)

== Release history ==
Region	Date	Format	Label
Germany	September 4, 2007	CD, digital download	Universal Music
United States	September 25, 2007	CD, digital download	Hollywood Records
Canada	September 25, 2007	CD, digital download	Hollywood Records
Hong Kong	September 25, 2007	CD	Universal Music
France	September 25, 2007	CD	Universal Music
United Kingdom	September 25, 2007	CD, digital download	Fascination, Polydor
Japan	September 25, 2007	CD, digital download	Avex Entertainment
