= A la Nanita Nana =

Traditional Christmas carol

United States Army Band singing A la Nanita Nana

"A la nanita nana" is a traditional Christmas time carol sung in honor of Baby Jesus, that has since become a popular lullaby in the Hispanic world.

== Origin ==
The composer of the song for voice and piano La nana, balada al Niño Jesús was José Ramón Gomis, born in 1856 in Novelda, Alicante, Spain; the lyrics were written by Juan Francisco Muñoz y Pabón. The score was published in 1904.

== The Cheetah Girls version ==
In 2006, a shortened version of the song was recorded by The Cheetah Girls (Raven-Symoné, Adrienne Bailon, Sabrina Bryan and Kiely Williams) accompanied by Mexican singer Belinda for the soundtrack album The Cheetah Girls 2, for the film of the same name, whose interpretation also appears in the film.

== See also ==
- The Cheetah Girls (band)
- Christian child's prayer
- List of Christmas carols
