= The Very Best of Disney Channel =

The Best of Disney Channel

Compilation album by Various artists
- Released: March 26, 2007 (UK); May 1, 2007 (US)
- Recorded: 2002–2006
- Genre: Pop; pop rock; teen pop
- Length: 53:03
- Label: Walt Disney

The Best of Disney Channel is best-of compilation album released on March 26, 2007. featuring 16 tracks from Disney Channel films and television series. A DVD is also included with selected music videos of songs from the accompanying CD.

== Track listing ==
=== CD ===
1. "Breaking Free" - (High School Musical) - Troy & Gabriella
2. "Best of Both Worlds" - (Hannah Montana) - Miley Cyrus as Hannah Montana
3. "The Party's Just Begun" - (The Cheetah Girls 2) - The Cheetah Girls
4. "Push It to the Limit" - (Jump In!) - Corbin Bleu
5. "I Can't Wait" - (Lizzie McGuire) - Hilary Duff
6. "Supernatural" - (That's So Raven) - Raven-Symoné
7. "Get Your Shine On" - (Kim Possible: So the Drama) - Jesse McCartney
8. "Outside Looking In" - (Read it and Weep) - Jordan Pruitt
9. "My Hero Is You" - (Tiger Cruise) - Hayden Panettiere
10. "Over It" - (Stuck in the Suburbs) - Anneliese van der Pol
11. "On the Ride" - (Cow Belles) - Aly & AJ
12. "Go Figure" - (Go Figure) - Everlife
13. "Say the Word" - (Kim Possible) - Christy Carlson Romano
14. "Strange World" - (Halloweentown High) - Jessie Payo
15. "The Other Side of Me" Remix - (Hannah Montana) - Miley Cyrus as Hannah Montana
16. "We're All in This Together" Remix - (High School Musical) - Cast of High School Musical

=== DVD ===
1. "Breaking Free" - Troy & Gabriella
2. "Best of Both Worlds" - Hannah Montana
3. "The Party's Just Begun" - The Cheetah Girls
4. "Push It to the Limit" - Corbin Bleu
5. "Supernatural" - Raven-Symoné
6. "Outside Looking In" - Jordan Pruitt
7. "Get Your Shine On" - Jesse McCartney
8. "On the Ride" - Aly & AJ
