= One World Tour =

One World Tour may refer to:

- One World Tour (The Cheetah Girls), a 2008 tour by The Cheetah Girls
- One World Tour (Ricky Martin), a 2015-2018 tour by Ricky Martin
