= Matthew Gerrard =

Canadian record producer and songwriter

- Born: Toronto, Ontario, Canada
- Genres: Pop
- Occupations: Record producer; songwriter
- Instruments: Piano; bass guitar

Matthew Gerrard is a Canadian record producer and songwriter.

== Biography ==
Gerrard grew up in Don Mills, a suburb of Toronto's north-east end. He attended George S. Henry Secondary School where he played trombone in band, later playing bass in a school-based 5-piece jazz fusion combo called Nemesis Fusion. Nemesis Fusion competed in two Canadian stage band festivals earning silver in 1982 and won the competition the following year when Gerrard wrote the group's original material. After high school Gerrard was a member of a band called Regatta, which released one self-titled album. He also played bass and toured with Kim Mitchell (former Max Webster lead man) and Von Groove (until the late 1990s/early 2000s).

== Career ==
Gerrard has written hit singles by artists such as Nick Carter ("Help Me"), Kelly Clarkson ("Breakaway"), Hilary Duff ("I Can't Wait", "Why Not?"), Eden's Crush ("Get Over Yourself") and Jesse McCartney ("She's No You"). He contributed songs to the soundtracks of the Disney Channel films High School Musical, The Cheetah Girls 2 (both 2006), Jump In! (2007) and Camp Rock (2008) and to the series Hannah Montana television soundtrack. He also wrote the original music for the Nickelodeon television movie Spectacular!, as well as writing the self-titled-debut song for Big Time Rush.

== Writing discography ==
- Across The Sky "Found By You"
- Bratz
- Brooke McClymont and Hilary Duff "I Can't Wait"
- Bubble Guppies
- Hilary Duff "Why Not", "Do You Want Me?"
- Lindsay Lohan "What Are You Waiting For"
- Tara Priya "Black Coffee"
- Big Time Rush "B.T.R"
- Camp Rock (writer and producer), "Who Will I Be", "Start the Party" (with Robbie Nevil)
- Christy Carlson Romano "Dive In", "Anyone But Me"
- Corbin Bleu "Push It to the Limit," "Celebrate You," "We Come To Party," "Never Met A Girl Like You," "If She Says Yeah"
- The Cheetah Girls "Five More Days 'til Christmas," "The Perfect Christmas", "Cheetah-licious Christmas", "Christmas In California", "No Ordinary Christmas," "The Simple Things," "The Party's Just Begun," "Step Up," "Human," "One World," "Dance Me If You Can" (with Robbie Nevil)
- Delta Goodrem "Lost Without You", "Be Strong"
- Seiko "Let's Fall in Love Again"
- Eden's Crush "Get Over Yourself"
- Elva Hsiao "Diamond Candy", "Diamond Candy"
- Everlife "Faded"
- Koda Kumi "Just The Way You Are"
- Nick Carter "Help Me"
- Nina "Where Is Love"
- Jordan Mccoy "Just Watch Me", "Life's An Open Door"
- Miley Cyrus "Best of Both Worlds", "Nobody's Perfect", "Life's What You Make It" and other various (with Robbie Nevil)
- High School Musical "We're All in This Together," "What Time Is It?", "All For One", "I Don't Dance ", "Start Of Something New", "Now or Never", "I Want It All", "A Night to Remember", "The Boys Are Back", "High School Musical", "I Can't Take My Eyes Off of You" (with Robbie Nevil)
- Kelly Clarkson "Breakaway"
- Jacky Cheung "Wonderful To Fly"
- Jessica Simpson "Underneath" (2003)
- Raven-Symoné (producer), "This Is My Time", "Typical, Bump, Mystify"
- Kate Alexa "Not Another Love Song"
- Hawk Nelson "Just Like Me", "Meaning Of Life"
- David Archuleta "A Little Too Not Over You", "Zero Gravity"
- Jonas Brothers "Drive" from Jonas L.A.
- Mike Doughty "Na Na Nothing"
- J-Min "If You Want" (with Bridget Benenate)
- Jeannie Ortega (Singer/Songwriter), Jump In!, "Live it Up"
- Reece Mastin "She's A Killer" from Beautiful Nightmare (album) (2012)
- The Dares "It’s Your World" (with Robbie Nevil)
- Hayden Panettiere "I Still Believe" from Cinderella III: A Twist in Time
