= BET Presents: The Encore =

American reality television series

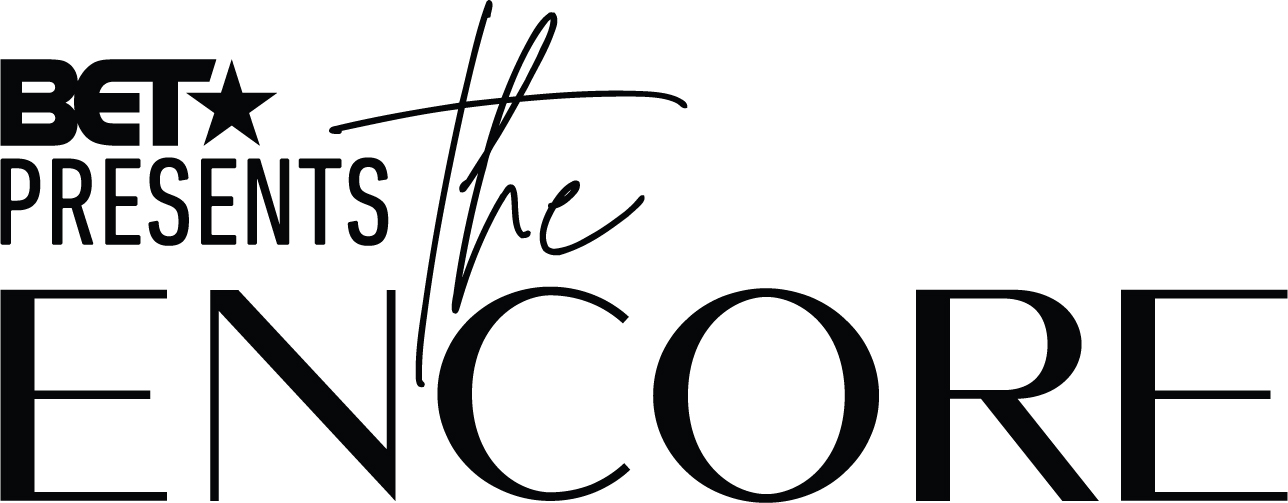
- Also known as: The Encore
- Genre: Music; Reality television
- Created by: Carlos King; Brandon Fuentes
- Presented by: Cita
- Starring: Shamari DeVoe; Irish Grinstead; LeMisha Grinstead; Nivea; Felisha King; Fallon King; Pamela Long; Aubrey O'Day; Kiely Williams
- Country of origin: United States
- Original language: English
- No. of seasons: 1
- No. of episodes: 10

Production
- Executive producers: Carlos King; Scott Jeffress; Alicia Martino; Brent Nisbett; Scott Shatsky; Alyssa Edwards
- Production locations: Atlanta, Georgia
- Camera setup: Multiple
- Running time: 40 minutes
- Production company: Kingdom Reign Entertainment

Original release
- Network: BET
- Release: June 9 – August 11, 2021

BET Presents: The Encore (also known as The Encore) is an American reality television series, which is produced by Kingdom Reign Entertainment for BET. The show chronicles 9 former R&B girl-group members & recording artists as they form a supergroup to create an album within 30 days. The series stars Shamari Devoe (of Blaque), 702 sisters Irish and LeMisha Grinstead, Nivea, Cherish twins Fallon & Felisha King, Pamela Long (of Total), Danity Kane's Aubrey O'Day, and Kiely Williams (of 3LW & The Cheetah Girls fame). Announced to premiere on June 9, 2021, the series drew 2.5 million viewers in its premiere across all BET-related networks.

== Production ==
Interest in the development of the series grew after clips leaked from an unaired reality show produced in the fall of 2015 titled Last Chance: Girl Group went viral. Snippets of former Destiny's Child member, Farrah Franklin and 3LW's Kiely Williams went viral in 2020. Other cast members in the original pilot included Devoe, the Cherish twins, Melody Thornton (The Pussycat Dolls) and D. Woods (Danity Kane). BET greenlit the series for a full 10-episode season, and announced its premiere date on May 19, 2021. Filming for the series took place in February and March 2021.

== Cast ==
Member	Original group(s)	Episodes									
Member	Original group(s)	1	2	3	4	5	6	7	8	9	10
Shamari DeVoe	Blaque										
Irish Grinstead	702										
LeMisha Grinstead	702										
Nivea	N/A (Note: Nivea is originally a solo artist.)										
Felisha King	Cherish										
Fallon King	Cherish										
Pamela Long (Note: Long performed as a member in the final episode, but left the group after the show finished filming to pursue a solo career in gospel music.)	Total										
Aubrey O'Day	Danity Kane										
Kiely Williams (Note: Williams appeared in all episodes, but was initially a creative director for the group, and not a member.)	3LW; The Cheetah Girls										

=== Notes ===
Key: = Member joins the group.
Key: = Member is in the group this episode.
Key: = Member leaves the group.
Key: = Member makes a guest appearance.

== Episodes ==
No.	Title	Original release date	U.S. viewers (millions)
1	"Let the Music Play"	June 9, 2021	0.48
After the group of nine learns they only have 30 days to form an R&B supergroup and cut a record, the ladies start assessing each other, and divisions appear when Aubrey forms a small clique.
2	"Time to Be Queen"	June 16, 2021	0.39
The women elect a queen to reign over group decisions, Pamela makes a surprising declaration about her past, LeMisha confronts the twins, and everyone wonders what Kiely's role really is.
3	"Do the Record"	June 23, 2021	0.37
As the women start work on their album, it's clear that not everyone shares the same vision or drive, creating a divide within the group.
4	"Questionable Queen"	June 30, 2021	0.33
The women try to put their drama aside and come together to help Pamela record her gospel song, but Aubrey has a different plan; Kiely sets her sights on becoming Queen of the house.
5	"Heavy Is The Head"	July 7, 2021	0.41
Tensions rise in the music mansion as the ladies struggle to find one collective vision for the group; with an absent queen and no one to take control, alliances continue to be formed.
6	"Demons & Division"	July 14, 2021	0.32
The women host a listening party for former bandmates and industry leaders to preview their album, but some feel their voices are not being heard; the ladies must face the truth about their past and one must decide if it's time.
7	"Cherish"	July 21, 2021	0.37
8	"A Miss-Direction"	July 28, 2021	N/A
9	"Stack That"	August 4, 2021	N/A
10	"The Encore"	August 11, 2021	0.40
