= Kiely Williams =

American singer

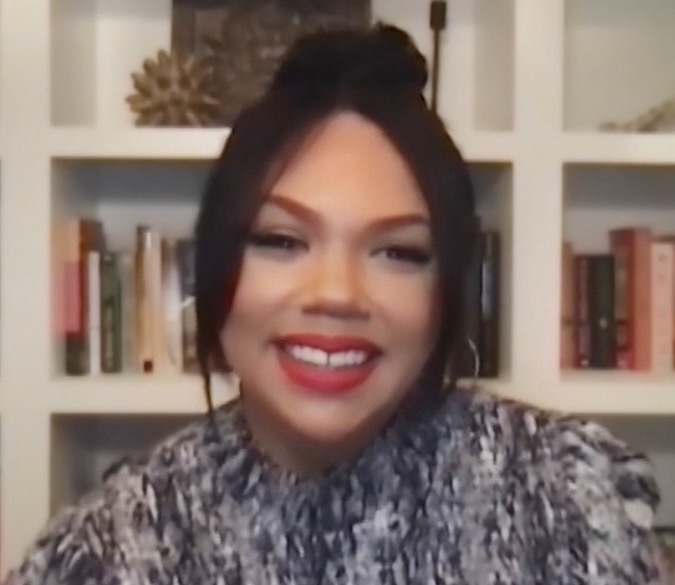
- Williams in 2021
- Occupations: Singer; actress; dancer
- Years active: 1999−present
- Spouse: Brandon Cox (m. 2016)
- Children: 2
- Musical career
- Origin: Annandale, New Jersey, U.S.
- Genres: R&B; pop; hip hop
- Instruments: Vocals
- Labels: Epic; So So Def; Walt Disney; Hollywood; Nine Lives Entertainment
- Formerly of: 3LW; the Cheetah Girls; BluPrint

Kiely Williams is an American singer, dancer and actress. She is known for her membership in the girl groups 3LW, the Cheetah Girls and BluPrint.

== Career ==
=== 1999–2002: Career beginnings and 3LW ===
In 1999, Williams along with Adrienne Bailon and Naturi Naughton formed the girl group 3LW. The initial formation of the 3LW was pulled together by Williams' mother, who also managed the group. 3LW was signed to Epic Records and work on their debut album began in 1999. Their first single, "No More (Baby I'ma Do Right)", was released in the fall of 2000. "No More" was a chart success, and was followed by "Playas Gon' Play" in early 2001.

The group's self-titled debut album, 3LW was released on December 5, 2000. The album went on to be certified platinum by the RIAA, selling 1.3 million copies in the US. In the summer of 2001, the group embarked on the MTV Total Request Live tour along with Destiny's Child, Dream, Nelly, Eve, and Jessica Simpson. Also in 2001, Williams appeared on an episode of Taina called "Blue Mascara" playing a character named Lia. Williams played herself in an episode of The Jersey called "Speaking of Coleman".

3LW returned in the summer of 2002 with the single "I Do (Wanna Get Close To You)", featuring Loon. That same summer, the group performed a concert special on Nickelodeon titled Live on Sunset. By August, the group was set to release their sophomore LP, A Girl Can Mack, when member Naughton left the group, alleging that she had a number of conflicts and arguments with Bailon, Williams, and their management. The album's release date was pushed back a month and debuted at No. 15 on the Billboard 200 with 53,000 copies sold its first week. Following Naughton's departure, Williams and Bailon decided to continue 3LW as a duo, causing the press to jokingly refer to them as "2LW". After A Girl Can Mack's second single "Neva Get Enuf" underperformed, 3LW released their Christmas-themed third studio album Naughty or Nice, which failed to appear on any major Billboard charts.

=== 2003–2008: The Cheetah Girls, 3LW disbandment, and acting career ===
Beginning in late 2002, 3LW held nationwide auditions for a new third member. Jessica "J" Benson was selected and with Benson, the group continued to promote A Girl Can Mack and began working on their third studio album. In June, 3LW departed from Epic Records and signed with So So Def.

Amidst 3LW's public drama, Bailon and Williams signed on to star in the Disney Channel Original Movie, The Cheetah Girls. They starred as two of four members of a female girl group named after the film, with Raven-Symoné and Sabrina Bryan portraying the final two members. Kiely Williams starred as Aquanette, a role in which singer Solange Knowles was originally cast; Knowles pulled out of the film prior to filming due to wanting to focus on the release of her debut album Solo Star. Williams initially auditioned for the role of Galleria, but did not get the part, and was subsequently offered the role of Aquanette when Knowles pulled out. The movie premiered in August 2003. Upon release, the film was the number one rated basic cable telecast and premiered to 6.5 million viewers, a record for Disney at the time. The film's soundtrack was certified double platinum by the RIAA. The film's success prompted Disney to turn the project into a real girl group, composed of Williams, Bailon, and Bryan. Raven was offered a spot in the group but opted to focus on her solo career. Bailon noted that both The Cheetah Girls and 3LW projects would continue concurrently. As a trio, the Cheetah Girls began working on their first studio album, Cheetah-licious Christmas, which was released in 2005.

The release of 3LW's third studio album, tentatively titled Phoenix Rising in 2003 and later Point of No Return in 2005, was delayed several times. On August 15, 2006, the group released the single "Feelin' You", but it did not impact any major charts. Point of No Return was shelved and Bailon and Williams continued with The Cheetah Girls. 3LW officially disbanded in 2007.

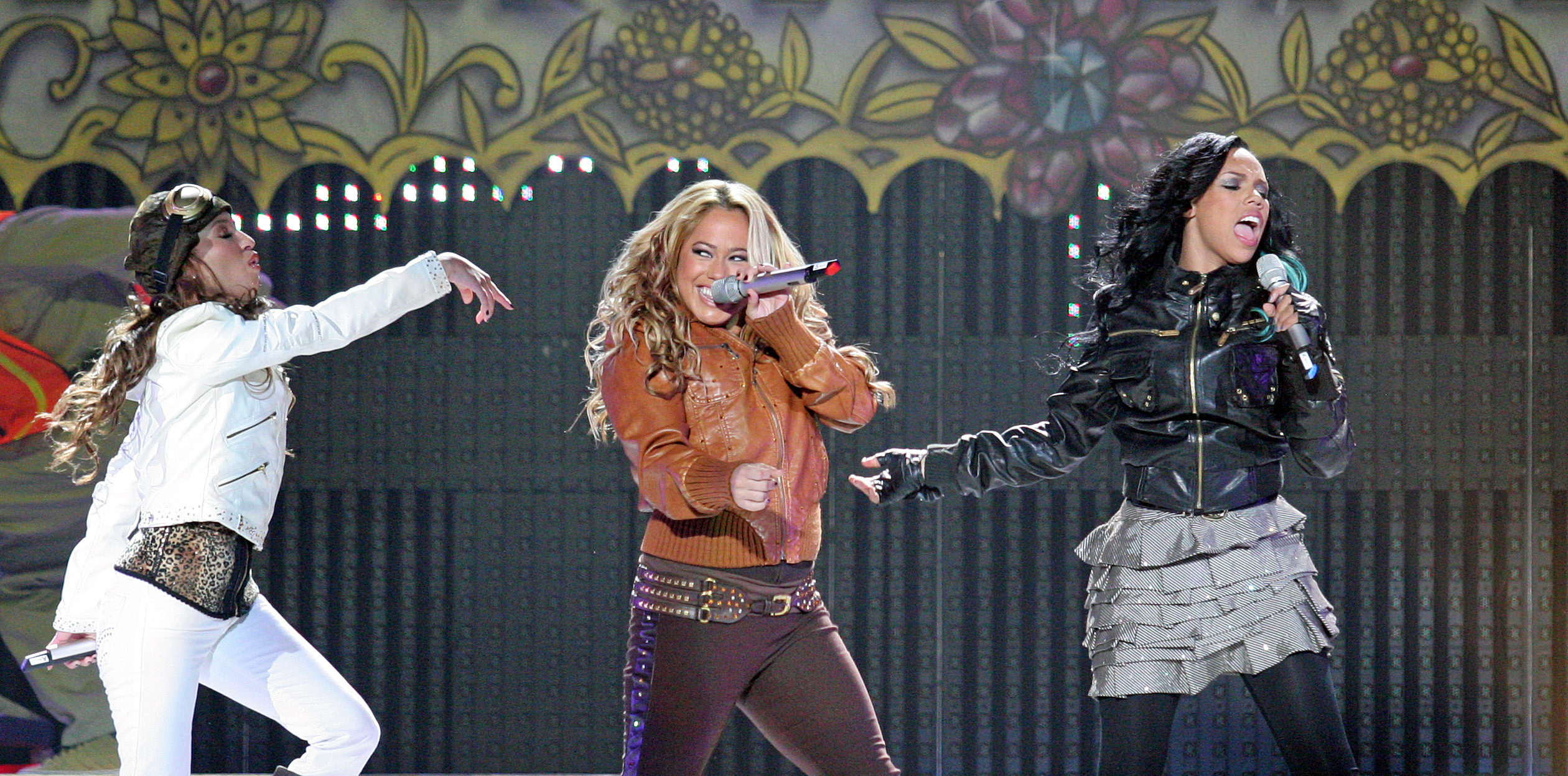
Kiely (right) performing with the Cheetah Girls on "One World Tour"

In April 2006, the Cheetah Girls began filming the sequel musical film The Cheetah Girls 2. Raven-Symoné returned for the film, which was shot on location in Barcelona, Spain. The Cheetah Girls 2 premiered on August 26, 2006, and received over 8.1 million viewers, making it the highest-rated premiere for a Disney Channel Original Movie at the time. The film's soundtrack album was certified platinum by the RIAA. The Cheetah Girls released their second studio album TCG on September 25, 2007, which featured the single "Fuego".

In January 2008, filming commenced on the third Cheetah Girls film, The Cheetah Girls: One World, in which the group appeared as a trio without Raven-Symoné. The Cheetah Girls: One World premiered on August 22, 2008 and its soundtrack was released on August 19. While the film was a ratings hit, debuting with 6.2 million viewers, the soundtrack failed to match the success of their previous soundtrack releases and sold 140,000 copies in its first two months. Williams recorded the solo song "Circle Game" for the film's soundtrack album. In late December 2008, the group disbanded.

=== 2009–2013: Continued acting and solo music ===
During the summer of 2008, Williams began quietly working on a solo singing project separate from work in the Cheetah Girls. Following the breakup of the Cheetah Girls, she filmed the music video for her song "Make Me a Drink" in New York City in November 2008.

In August 2009, a preview of what was expected to be Williams debut solo single "Make Me a Drink" (which was written by Young Money Entertainment recording artist Shanell) appeared on YouTube, "Make Me A Drink" but never officially released, and leaked to the internet in late 2018.

She completed a starring role in the independent film Elle: A Modern Cinderella Tale. In late 2009, Kiely began work on Stomp the Yard: Homecoming. The role of Kandi Kane, in Elle, required Kiely to record several songs for the film and the accompanying soundtrack and learn extensive choreography. Stomp the Yard: Homecoming and Elle were both released in 2010.

On October 28, 2009, Williams official website released the instrumentals of her first single, titled "Spectacular", a song written by Williams and produced by Mike City. The single was released exclusively to club DJs the first week on November. The single was released to the public on January 15, 2010, and the accompanying music video was released to YouTube on April 5, 2010, to mostly negative reviews. The video caused so much controversy that Williams opted to respond to its negative YouTube reviews on her website as well as on The Joy Behar Show on HLN.

=== 2014–2020: Internet series, creative direction ===
Kiely Williams and Sabrina Bryan co-starred on the web series "Dinner With Friends", "March Moms", and "Bad Sex With Good People". Following the finale of Bad Sex with Good People, Williams moved behind the scenes to work as a creative director and in new artist development.

=== 2021–present: BET Presents: The Encore, BluPrint ===
In 2021, she starred in BET Presents: The Encore which documented the formation of R&B supergroup BluPrint alongside Shamari Devoe of Blaque, Fallon and Felisha King of Cherish, and Pamela Long of Total. Their eponymous debut EP was released August 11, 2021.

== Personal life ==
Williams married Brandon Cox in December 2016, in Fort Worth, Texas. Sabrina Bryan served as a bridesmaid. The couple announced they were expecting their first child in October 2017. Their daughter was born in March 2018. They welcomed their second daughter on March 29, 2022.

== Discography ==
See also: 3LW discography and the Cheetah Girls discography

== Filmography ==
Television roles
Year	Title	Role	Notes
1993	TriBeCa	Little Girl	Episode: "The Box"
2001	Taina	Lia	Episode: "Blue Mascara"
2001	The Jersey	Herself	Episode: "Speaking of Coleman"
2002	All That	Herself	Episode: "3LW" (uncredited)
2003	The Cheetah Girls	Aquanette "Aqua" Walker	Disney Channel Original Movie
2006	The Cheetah Girls 2	Aquanette "Aqua" Walker	Disney Channel Original Movie
2007–2008	Disney Channel Games	Contestant	
2008	The Cheetah Girls: One World	Aquanette "Aqua" Walker	Disney Channel Original Movie
2008	Studio DC: Almost Live	Herself	
2008	The Suite Life of Zack & Cody	Herself (with the Cheetah Girls)	Episode: "Doin' Time in Suite 2330"
2017	Celebrity Family Feud	Contestant	Episode: "Boy Band vs. Girl Group"
2021	BET Presents: The Encore	Contestant	

Film roles
Year	Title	Role	Notes
2008	The Sisterhood of the Traveling Pants 2	Yaffa Waitress	Cameo
2008	The House Bunny	Lily	
2010	Elle: A Modern Cinderella Tale	Kandi Kane / Brenda Smirkle	
2010	Stomp the Yard: Homecoming	Brenda	Direct to video
2013	Holla II	Monica	

Internet series
Year	Title	Role	Notes
2011	Dinner With Friends	Herself	9 episodes, co-creator and executive producer
2015	March Moms	Valerie "Val"	8 episodes, co-creator and executive producer
2017	Bad Sex With Good People	Jess	10 episodes, co-creator and executive producer

== Awards and nominations ==
Year	Award	Category	Work	Result
2001	BET Award	Best Female Group	3LW	Nominated
2001	Teen Choice Award	Choice Breakout Artist	3LW	Nominated
2001	Teen Choice Award	Choice Pop Group	3LW	Nominated
2001	Soul Train Lady of Soul Award	R&B/Soul Album of the Year – Group, Band or Duo	3LW	Won
2001	Soul Train Lady of Soul Award	Best R&B/Soul or Rap New Artist – Group, Band or Duo	"No More (Baby I'ma Do Right)"	Won
2001	Soul Train Lady of Soul Award	Best R&B/Soul Single – Group, Band or Duo	"No More (Baby I'ma Do Right)"	Nominated
2003	Soul Train Lady of Soul Award	Best R&B/Soul Single – Group, Band or Duo	"I Do (Wanna Get Close to You)"	Nominated
2003	Source Award	Best Female R&B Act	3LW	Nominated
