= Cita's World =

- Title card.
- Also known as: Jam Zone (1997–1999)
- Written by: Tracye Z. Kinzer
- Directed by: Corey Turner
- Starring: Cita (hostess)
- Voices of: Kittie Kaboom
- Theme music composer: Randy Parker & Danny Class
- Country of origin: United States
- Original language: English

Production
- Running time: 120 mins

Original release
- Network: BET
- Release: September 20, 1999 – January 3, 2003

Cita's World is a video music show that originally aired on BET from September 20, 1999, until January 3, 2003. An animated African-American female character named Cita (voiced by comedian Kali Bianca Troy, who is now a voice actress and influencer known as Kittie Kaboom) would offer comedic interludes about urban life, talk about current pop culture events, and would also interact/talk to viewers who were watching the program, by emails sent into BET studios, or sometimes even to viewers live, via a telephone hotline; All while current popular hit Hip-Hop, and R&B, music videos were also played in rotation on the series.

== Overview ==
It was the first show to feature a virtual reality Black character as the host named Cita. Cita's World was the brainchild of Curtis A. Gadson, B.E.T. Senior VP of Programming at that time, & Corey Turner, concept designer and director. The show moved production locations 3 times. The first year, the show was produced and shot in BET's headquarters in Washington, D.C. The second year the show was moved to Harlem in BET's newly rented space. The Cita's World set and technical infrastructure sat next to the 106 & Park set.

The final year the show was moved to Burbank, California, where the show was also given a major overhaul. New optical tracking motion capture to acquire Kittie's performances, its own dedicated stage for the blue screen set, and a remodeled and designed Cita. The show would benefit from the relocation to Los Angeles with staff that was already proficient in visual effects workflows and techniques.

=== Jam Zone ===
It was co-developed, produced and sometimes written by both Tracye Z. Kinzer and Kittie KaBoom. The show ran from 1999 to 2003 in television. The show was originally named Jam Zone when it was created in 1997, which was just a wallpaper video show until 1999, when Cita emerged into the homes of millions.

=== Format ===
In between videos, Cita would talk to the viewers, answer viewer mail and offer her unadulterated opinions on current events, celebrities and more. The voice and motion of the Cita character was performed by kittie KaBoom. From Washington, D.C. to New York City to Hollywood, the shows content came from producer Tracye Kinzer, as well as kittie KaBoom and Writer, Cliff McBean. Tracye assigned her writers Cliff McBean, Monica "Monie Mon" Dyson, Wynter Hobson and Angela Yarborough and sometimes kittie topics as well as allowing them to generate their own ideas to create great entertainment.

== Spin-off media ==
Due to the popularity of the show, BET published "Cita's World", which addresses the deluge of emails and letters sent to the show. In 2021, after years of absence, Cita was redesigned and featured on BET Presents: The Encore.
