= Sabrina Bryan =

American singer (born 1984)

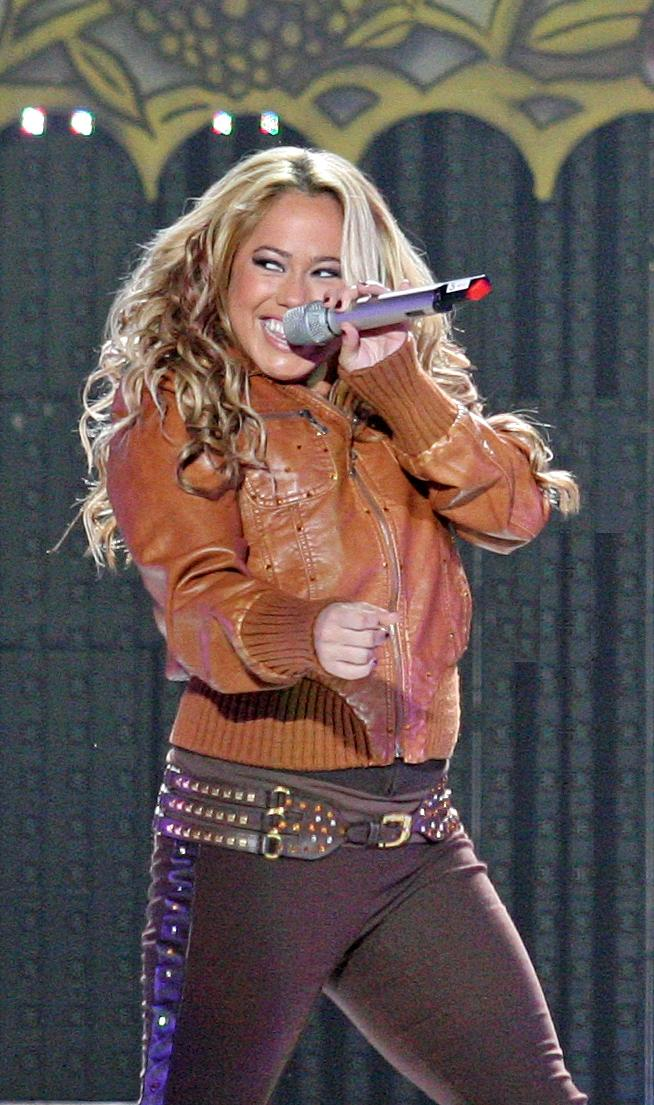
- Bryan performing in 2008

Background information
- Born: Reba Sabrina Hinojosa; September 16, 1984 (age 42); Yorba Linda, California, U.S.
- Genres: R&B; pop; hip-hop
- Occupations: Actress; singer; dancer; choreographer; fashion designer; television personality
- Instrument: Vocals
- Years active: 1996–present
- Labels: Walt Disney (2002–2006); Sony (2005–2006); Hollywood (2006–2008)
- Formerly of: The Cheetah Girls (2003–2008)
- Spouse: Jordan Lundberg (m. 2018)

Reba Sabrina Hinojosa (born September 16, 1984), known professionally as Sabrina Bryan, is an American singer and actress. She is best known as a member of the girl group the Cheetah Girls, starring in the Disney Channel Original Movie The Cheetah Girls and its sequels, The Cheetah Girls 2 and The Cheetah Girls: One World. Before she appeared on television, Bryan was a dancer, and trained at Hart Academy of Dance, located in La Habra, California.

== The Cheetah Girls ==
In 2003, Bryan starred as Dorinda "Do" Thomas in the Disney Channel Original Movie The Cheetah Girls, a musical comedy based on the bestselling series of young adult books of the same name by Deborah Gregory. The film depicts four best friends (Raven-Symoné, Adrienne Bailon, Kiely Williams, and Bryan) who form a pop group in their first year of high school and reach unexpected success. Prior to The Cheetah Girls, two of Bryan's castmates Bailon and Williams were members of R&B girl group 3LW. The Cheetah Girls premiered on August 15, 2003, to 6.5 million viewers, a huge ratings success.

Due to the popularity of the film, Bryan and her other bandmates achieved mainstream pop music success as members of the official Cheetah Girls group. The movie's soundtrack reached No. 33 on the Billboard 200 and was certified double platinum, selling more than 2 million copies in the United States. It is one of the best selling albums from Walt Disney Records, alongside the soundtrack to High School Musical. In November 2005, the group released their Christmas album Cheetah-licious Christmas and toured the US on their Cheetah-licious Christmas Tour.

The Cheetah Girls 2 premiered on the Disney Channel on August 25, 2006. Its premiere received the highest ratings of all Disney Channel Movies at its time, bringing in a total of over 8.1 million viewers, beating both the premiere ratings of High School Musical (7.7 million) and the previous highest rated DCOM record holder, Cadet Kelly (7.8 million). The film would also become the highest rated Cheetah Girls movie in the trilogy. The sequel's plot followed the Cheetah Girls as they become largely successful and take a tour of Spain. The film's soundtrack was released on August 15, 2006. It debuted at No. 5 on the Billboard 200, and has moved over 1.4 million copies to date, achieving platinum status.

After the release of Cheetah Girls 2, Bryan, along with her fellow Cheetah Girls, toured the United States on their The Party's Just Begun Tour from September 2006 to March 2007. While touring, The Cheetah Girls began work on their official debut studio album. Bryan was interviewed by Billboard magazine, where she stated that the group was eager to showcase a "more mature" sound to gather an audience of older fans, while still keeping the lyrics clean for the younger fanbase as well. Williams was quoted as saying that the band members co-produced and co-wrote a "good portion" of the album. On September 25, 2007, TCG was released by Hollywood Records, with a debut of No. 44 on the Billboard 200 albums chart. It was the first album by the group not to be released by Walt Disney Records. 126,000 copies have been sold to date.

The Cheetah Girls: One World, premiered on August 22, 2008, the only release to not feature Raven Symoné. The film revolves around the three remaining Cheetah Girls visiting India to appear in a Bollywood musical. The movie premiered to over 6.2 million viewers, and reached 7 million viewers in its final half-hour. One World's soundtrack was released three days prior to the film's release, on August 19, 2008. It peaked at No. 13 on the Billboard 200. The Cheetah Girls kicked off their One World Tour on October 8, 2008, in Corpus Christi, Texas, and concluded on December 21, 2008, in San Diego, California.

In early 2009, The Cheetah Girls officially announced that they had disbanded, in favor of pursuing solo projects.

Bryan and former Cheetah Girl bandmate and close friend Kiely Williams continued their creative collaboration with the development of a web series talk show, Dinner with Friends. The first episode premiered on July 1, 2011, on YouTube. The series ran for nine episodes, concluding on August 28, 2011.

On July 8, 2026, Raven-Symoné announced the fourth instalment to the franchise The Cheetah Girls: Next Gen with Symoné, Adrienne Bailon and Bryan returning as Galleria, Chanel and Dorinda. Kiely Williams will not be reprising her role in the fourth instalment. The film will follow Galleria and Chanel taking Faith, Galleria's daughter, Dior, Chanel's sister and their friends to Africa where they'll volunteer at a wildlife sanctuary. Meanwhile, the new generation of Cheetahs will "test their friendship, find their voice, and discover the true Cheetah spirit as they save the preserve and ultimately take the stage as the new Cheetah Girls".

== Television and film appearances ==
Bryan has acted in several TV shows, with notable guest appearances in several episodes of the soap opera The Bold and the Beautiful. She also appeared in two series pilots, King's Pawn and Driving Me Crazy, neither of which made it to air. She then had guest appearances in shows like The Geena Davis Show and The Jersey. She also appeared in the TV series, Grounded For Life, before her rise to stardom in The Cheetah Girls. She had a small supporting role as Mrs. Murray in the 2008 straight-to-DVD film Mostly Ghostly, and stars in the comedy film Help Me, Help You (formerly titled If It Ain't Broke, Break It). Bryan is the voice of Pamela Hamster in the animated Disney channel series Fish Hooks appearing in two episodes "Hooray for Hamsterwood" and "Pamela Hamster Returns". Kiely Williams and Bryan co-starred on the web series "Dinner With Friends", "March Moms", and "Bad Sex With Good People".

=== Dancing with the Stars ===
Bryan competed in the 5th season of Dancing with the Stars. She teamed with professional dancer Mark Ballas.

In 2012, Bryan was chosen by the public to compete on the 15th season of the show as one of the All-Stars contestants. She was partnered with Louis Van Amstel. She was eliminated sixth from the show, despite receiving a perfect 30 for her Rumba and topping the leaderboard for two consecutive weeks. Coincidentally, she was eliminated on October 30, 2012, five years to the day she was voted off the first time and in the sixth week.

She was featured in the Soft Scrub Dancing with the Stars Live Tour. She danced with Derek Hough (while Mark was injured), then with Mark, until her last show on January 13, 2008, when she departed for India to film The Cheetah Girls: One World.

She was one of the featured celebrity dancers in the Live Dancing with the Stars Las Vegas show, running April 14 through August 5, 2012 at the Tropicana Resort and Casino theater.

She has been a celebrity correspondent for the behind-the-scenes look at season 8 of Dancing with the Stars for E! News, and TV Guide show Reality Chat. For season 9 of Dancing with the Stars, she co-hosted TV Guide show Reality Chat and hosted backstage at Dancing with the Stars on abc.com. Bryan was asked back to co-host backstage at Dancing with the Stars for the 10th through 12th seasons. She has interviewed season 10 winner of the series Nicole Scherzinger, country singer Reba McEntire, Evan Lysacek, Erin Andrews, Kate Gosselin, and many more.

== Solo projects ==
=== Byou ===
Bryan released a DVD workout entitled Byou in December 2005. The workout is especially geared towards young girls with a tagline that reads "Be Happy, Be Healthy – BYOU!". More than a quarter million DVDs have been sold. A soundtrack to the DVD was also released which included the song "Byou", performed by Bryan, as well as other songs by her and other artists. The song "Byou" was also featured on the Radio Disney: Move It! CD which was released in 2006. Bryan released Byou 2, on January 13, 2009. Byou 2 features one exclusive track by Bryan called "C'mon".

=== Princess of Gossip ===
Bryan teamed up with popular author Julia DeVillers to write the book Princess of Gossip, the story of an ordinary girl with an extraordinary secret. Princess of Gossip was released on October 8, 2008.

== Personal life ==
In April 2017, Bryan became engaged to strategic accounts manager Jordan Lundberg after six years of dating. They were married on October 6, 2018, with Kiely Williams serving as matron of honor. In March 2020, they announced that they were expecting their first child, a girl due in September. On August 31, 2020, she gave birth to a daughter. In November 2022, they announced that they were expecting their second child. On May 2, 2023, she gave birth to a boy.

== Filmography ==
Film
Year	Film	Role	Notes
2009	Help Me, Help You	Sandy	Independent feature film
2017	Dance Night Obsession	Kate	Independent feature film
Television film
Year	Title	Role	Notes
1996	Mrs. Santa Claus	Fritzie	Television movie
2003	The Cheetah Girls	Dorinda "Do" Thomas	Disney Channel Original Movie; filmed in Canada.
2006	The Cheetah Girls 2	Dorinda "Do" Thomas	Disney Channel Original Movie; filmed in Spain
2008	The Cheetah Girls: One World	Dorinda "Do" Thomas	Disney Channel Original Movie; filmed in India
2027	The Cheetah Girls: Next Gen	Dorinda "Do" Thomas	Disney Channel Original Movie; filming in South Africa
Straight to DVD
Year	Title	Role	Notes
2006	Byou	Herself	Workout DVD
2008	Mostly Ghostly	Mrs. Murray	Horror fantasy movie
2009	Byou 2	Herself	Workout DVD
2014	The Next Dance	Ivy	Workout DVD
Television
Year	Title	Role	Notes
1999	King's Pawn	Kelly	Unaired TV Pilot
2000	Driving Me Crazy	Terry	Unaired TV Pilot
2015	I Think My Babysitter's An Alien	Senator Grant	
Television guest appearances
Year	Title	Role	Notes
2001	Grounded for Life	Suzy	Episode: "Jimmy was Kung-Fu Fighting"
2001	The Jersey	Angelina Renard	
2001	The Geena Davis Show	Tina	
2002	The Bold and the Beautiful	Alisa Cordova	7 Episodes
2007	Dancing with the Stars	Herself — Season 5	Eliminated 6th.
2007	Disney Channel Games	Herself	Yellow Team
2008	The Suite Life of Zack & Cody	Herself (with The Cheetah Girls)	
2008	Studio DC: Almost Live	Herself (with The Cheetah Girls)	
2008	Disney Channel Games	Herself	The Comets/Yellow Team
2009	E! News	Herself	Correspondent for the eighth season of Dancing with the Stars
2010–2011	ABC	Herself	Correspondent for the 9, 10 & 11th season Dancing with the Stars
2010–2012	Fish Hooks	Pamela Hamster (voice)	3 episodes
2012	Dancing with the Stars	Herself	All Stars season; eliminated 6th
2013	Supah Ninjas	Andrea	Episode: "The End of the Ninja"
2017	Celebrity Family Feud	Herself	Contestant
Internet
Year	Film	Role	Notes
2011	Dinner With Friends	Herself	9 Episodes
2015	March Moms	Lauren	8 Episodes
2017	Bad Sex With Good People	Valerie	10 Episodes
2019	Christy’s Kitchen Throwback	Herself	Web series

== Discography ==
=== Albums with the Cheetah Girls ===
The Cheetah Girls Soundtrack

- Released: August 12, 2003 (U.S.)
- Record Company: Walt Disney Records

Cheetah-licious Christmas

- Released: October 11, 2005 (U.S.)
- Record Company: Walt Disney Records

The Cheetah Girls 2 Soundtrack

- Released: August 25, 2006 (U.S.)
- Peak Position: #5
- Record Company: Walt Disney Records

In Concert: The Party's Just Begun Tour

- Released: September 10, 2007 (U.S.)
- Record Company: Walt Disney Records

TCG

- Released: September 25, 2007 (U.S.)
- Peak Position: #44 (U.S.)
- Record Company: Hollywood Records

The Cheetah Girls: One World Soundtrack

- Released: August 19, 2008 (U.S.)
- Peak Position: #13
- Record Company: Walt Disney Records

=== Solo album ===
Byou

- Released: January 17, 2006 (U.S.)
- Record Company: Sony/BMG Special Marketing

Byou 2

- Released: 2009 (U.S.)
- Record Company: Sony/BMG Special Marketing

=== Songs ===
- "Byou"
- "Just Watch Me"
- "C'mon" (Alternate version featured in Byou 2)
- "Just Getting Started"
- "Crazy on the Dance Floor" (from The Cheetah Girls: One World soundtrack)

=== Music videos ===
- 2006: "Byou"
- 2010: "Byou 2"

== Tours ==
- The Cheetah Girls – One World Tour (2008)
- Dancing with the Stars — The Tour (2007–2008)
- The Party's Just Begun Tour (2006–2007)
- Cheetah-licious Christmas Tour (2005)
