= Fuego (The Cheetah Girls song) =

Single by the Cheetah Girls

from the album TCG
- Released: September 15, 2007
- Recorded: 2006
- Genre: Latin
- Length: 3:28
- Label: Hollywood
- Songwriters: Jonathan Rotem; E. Kidd Bogart; Lionel Richie; Élan Rivera
- Producer: J. R. Rotem

The Cheetah Girls singles chronology
"So Bring It On" (2007)	"Fuego" (2007)	"One World" (2008)

"Fuego" (Spanish for "fire") is a song by the Cheetah Girls and is the second single from their second studio album, TCG. On their official MySpace profile, the girls described the song as a "Latin party anthem" with a sample of Lionel Richie's '80's hit single "All Night Long (All Night)". The song was released on September 15, 2007 on Radio Disney and was later released through digital distribution and serviced to mainstream top 40 and rhythmic radio stations on October 10. It peaked at #27 on Billboard's Hot Dance Club Play chart.

== Promotion ==
In 2007, as promotion for the single and for the album, the Girls performed "Fuego" on Good Morning America on October 12, and on The Early Show on October 13. The song was also featured on the set list for their One World Tour.

== Music video ==
The music video was directed by Marcus Raboy on October 21, 2007 and it premiered on Disney Channel on November 22. It received heavy rotation on Disney Channel and MTV Tres. There is a Spanish version of the video in which there are new scenes and different sequences.

The video revolves around the three girls dancing with a crowd of people at a party. Throughout the video are scenes of the girls dancing while other people are performing a dance routine in front of a red-orange background.

== Track listing ==
iTunes Single

1. "Fuego" - 3:09
2. "Fuego" (Spanish Version) - 3:27

Remix EP

1. "Fuego" (Cabana Remix)
2. "Fuego" (Ranny Radio Edit)
3. "Fuego" (English Club Mix)
4. "Fuego" (Party Mix)
5. "Fuego" (Party Dub)
6. "Fuego" (Spanish Club)

== Chart performance ==
The song debuted and peaked at #27 on the Billboard's Hot Dance Club Play during the week of February 28, 2008. It did not enter the Billboard Hot 100, but it did reach #22 on the Bubbling Under Hot 100 Singles.

== Charts ==
Chart (2008)	Peak position
U.S. Billboard Bubbling Under Hot 100 Singles	22
U.S. Billboard Hot Dance Club Play	27

== Release history ==
Region	Date	Format	Label(s)
United States	September 15, 2007	Radio Disney/rhythmic top 40 radio	Hollywood Records
United States	October 10, 2007	Digital download	Hollywood Records
