= Cheetah-licious Christmas =

Studio album by the Cheetah Girls
- Released: October 11, 2005
- Recorded: July–September 2005
- Genre: Christmas
- Length: 42:37
- Label: Walt Disney
- Producers: Antonina Armato; Ray Cham; Matthew Gerrard; Tim James; Jay Landers; Robbie Nevil

The Cheetah Girls chronology
The Cheetah Girls (2003)	Cheetah-licious Christmas (2005)	The Cheetah Girls 2 (2006)

Singles from Cheetah-licious Christmas
- 1. "Cheetah-licious Christmas" Released: November 1, 2005

Professional ratings
Review scores
Source	Rating
AllMusic	2.5/5 stars
Common Sense Media	3/5 stars

Cheetah-licious Christmas is the debut studio album by American girl group the Cheetah Girls. It was released by Walt Disney Records on October 11, 2005. The album features seven classic Christmas songs as well as six original songs. The album peaked at No. 74 on the Billboard 200 chart.

== Track listing ==
1. "Five More Days 'til Christmas" * (Matthew Gerrard; Robbie Nevil) – 3:04
2. "Santa Claus Is Coming to Town" (Haven Gillespie; J. Fred Coots) – 3:28
3. "Perfect Christmas" * (J. Landers; Matthew Gerrard; Robbie Nevil) – 3:08
4. "Cheetah-licious Christmas" * (Matthew Gerrard; Robbie Nevil) – 3:32
5. "A Marshmallow World" (C. Sigman; P. DeRose) – 2:47
6. "Christmas in California" * (The Cheetah Girls; Matthew Gerrard; Robbie Nevil) – 3:01
7. "No Ordinary Holiday" * (B. Benenate; Matthew Gerrard) – 3:31
8. "All I Want for Christmas Is You" (M. Carey; W. Afanasieff) – 4:02
9. "This Christmas" (Donny Hathaway; N. McKinnor) – 3:06
10. "I Saw Mommy Kissing Santa Claus" (T. Connor) – 2:51
11. "The Simple Things" * (Matthew Gerrard; Robbie Nevil) – 3:41
12. "Last Christmas" (G. Michael) – 3:49
13. "Feliz Navidad" (J. Feliciano) – 2:37

Note: Original songs marked with a (*)

== Singles ==
"Cheetah-licious Christmas" was the first single from the album, released on November 1, 2005, along with a music video that showcases the members performing the song inside of a snow globe dressed in winter clothing. It was performed on their Cheetah-licious Christmas Tour and was added to the set list of The Party's Just Begun Tour during the holiday season.

"Five More Days 'til Christmas" was released exclusively on Radio Disney on December 12, 2005. It was performed on their Cheetah-licious Christmas Tour.

== Personnel ==
- Antonina Armato – producer
- Adrienne Bailon – group member
- Sabrina Bryan – group member
- Kiely Williams – group member
- Ray Cham – producer
- Jordan Foley – art direction
- Matthew Gerrard – producer
- Tim James – producer
- Jay Landers – executive producer
- Stephen Marcussen – mastering
- Dani Markman – artist coordination
- Robbie Nevil – producer

== Charts ==
Chart (2005)	Peak position
U.S. Billboard 200	74
U.S. Holiday Albums	1
U.S. Top Kid Audio	1
U.S. Top Heatseekers	4

== Tour ==
In the winter of 2005, The Cheetah Girls went on tour to support the Christmas album. Aly & AJ went along with them, as the opening act, to support their own album Into the Rush, although the Jonas Brothers performed as surprise guests opening for both The Cheetah Girls and Aly & AJ for a total of 10 shows of the tour, promoting It's About Time, their first album. The holiday theme of the concert included giant presents (in which the Cheetah Girls performed), Winter clothes, and even a tropical theme for their song "Christmas in California", which included surfboards with the girls' names on them. The Cheetah Girls also sang songs from the first Cheetah Girls soundtrack, their song "I Won't Say (I'm in Love)" (from DisneyMania 3), and their version of "Shake a Tail Feather" (from the Chicken Little soundtrack). The girls went on tour to support this album entitled the Cheetah-licous Christmas Tour.
