= Strut (The Cheetah Girls song) =

Single by The Cheetah Girls

from the album The Cheetah Girls 2
- Released: August 8, 2006 (digital download)
- Recorded: 2005
- Genre: Dance-pop; Latin; R&B
- Length: 3:19 (single edit)
- Label: Walt Disney
- Songwriter: Jamie Houston
- Producer: Jamie Houston

The Cheetah Girls singles chronology
"The Party's Just Begun" (2006)	"Strut" (2006)	"Step Up" (2006)

"Strut" is the second single from The Cheetah Girls 2 movie soundtrack.

== Background and composition ==
The single officially premiered on Radio Disney on June 20, 2006 and was released officially for digital download on August 8. The song was produced by Jamie Houston. The single debuted at #60 on the Billboard Hot 100, becoming their second single to chart. The song is their most successful single considered that it's their highest peaking single to date, peaking at #53 on the Billboard charts.

=== Vocals ===
The track features Adrienne Bailon on lead vocals, with each girl having some solo verses. Kiely Williams and Raven-Symoné lead the chorus with Bailon, while Sabrina Bryan has a couple lines during the chorus. Symoné and Williams also sing some ad-libs. When live, Bailon, Bryan and Williams took Symoné's parts. All 4 girls sings the chorus.

== Music video ==
The Cheetah Girls did not shoot a video for the single because the song was from their new film The Cheetah Girls 2 and was used to promote the film. Because of that, the video for the song features clips from the movie and the girls dancing, singing and running through the streets of Barcelona which is also a clip from the movie/musical. It premiered on August 12, 2006 on Disney Channel.

== Track listing ==
1. "Strut"
2. "Radio Disney Exclusive Interview"
3. "Cheetah Girls 2 Trailer" (video, only available on iTunes)

== Charts ==
Chart (2006)	Peak position
U.S. Billboard Hot 100	53
U.S. Billboard Pop 100	44

== Release details ==
Region	Date	Label	Format
United States	June 20, 2006	Walt Disney Records	Radio Disney
United States	August 8, 2006	Walt Disney Records	Digital Download
