= The Cheetah Girls 2 (soundtrack) =

Soundtrack album by The Cheetah Girls
- Released: August 15, 2006
- Recorded: 2005–2006
- Genre: Latin pop; R&B
- Length: 42:22
- Label: Walt Disney
- Producer: Kenny Ortega (exec.); Debra Martin Chase (exec.); Raven-Symoné (exec.); Whitney Houston (exec.); Ray "Sôl Survivor" Cham; Greg Curtis; Matthew Gerrard; Jamie Houston; David Lawrence; Robbie Nevil

The Cheetah Girls chronology
| Cheetah-licious Christmas (2005) | The Cheetah Girls 2 (2006) | In Concert: The Party's Just Begun Tour (2007) |

Singles from The Cheetah Girls 2
- 1. "The Party's Just Begun" Released: June 5, 2006; 2. "Strut" Released: August 8, 2006; 3. "Dance With Me" Released: September 2, 2006

The Cheetah Girls 2 is the soundtrack album to the 2006 Disney Channel Original Movie of the same name. It was released on August 15, 2006, by Walt Disney Records. The album was executive produced by Kenny Ortega, Debra Martin Chase, Raven-Symoné and Whitney Houston. It features appearances from Drew Seeley and Belinda.

The songs on the soundtrack are a diverse blend of Latin pop and R&B. The album peaked at number five on the US Billboard 200 and has been certified platinum by the Recording Industry Association of America (RIAA), selling 1.4 million copies in the United States.

== Background and release ==
Following the success of The Cheetah Girls' first soundtrack, with sales of over two million copies in the United States, The Cheetah Girls 2 soundtrack was released on August 15, 2006, just ten days before the film premiered. A karaoke version of the album was released on October 10, titled Disney's Karaoke Series: Cheetah Girls 2.

A 2-disc special edition of the album was released on November 7, 2006, featuring all original songs from the soundtrack, a cover of "Route 66" which was used to promote the Disney/Pixar film Cars, a remix of "Strut", a DVD of the Disneyland concert special that aired on Disney Channel, and an exclusive interview with The Cheetah Girls.

== Singles ==
"The Party's Just Begun" was released as the first single from the album on July 11, 2006, in the United States and on January 8, 2007, in the United Kingdom. The song debuted at number 94 on the Billboard Hot 100 on September 9, 2006, peaking at number 85 the following week. In the United Kingdom the song debuted at number 53 on the UK Singles Chart in January 2007.

"Strut" was released as the second single on August 8, 2006, in the United States. The song debuted at number 60 on the Billboard Hot 100 on September 9. The following week, the song reached its peak position of number 53.

== Critical reception ==
Professional ratings
Review scores
| Source | Rating |
|---|---|
| AllMusic | 3.5/5 stars |

Heather Phares from AllMusic reviewed the album giving it a 3.5 star rating: "Two years after the original Cheetah Girls movie, Galleria, Chanel, Aquanette, and Dorinda return with The Cheetah Girls 2, a sequel and a full-length soundtrack. The film's subtitle is "When in Spain" and exotic flourishes such as Spanish guitar and sweeping pianos color many of the album's tracks. While the entirely en español songs feel a little forced, hints of this sound give songs like "Strut" and "Amigas Cheetahs" the feeling of being the great-great-granddaughters of Madonna's "La Isla Bonita" or the Spice Girls' "Spice Up Your Life". As expected, Raven-Symoné dominates the Cheetah Girls, both in character as Cheetah Girl Galleria and as herself".

== Commercial performance ==
The Cheetah Girls 2 debuted at number five on the Billboard 200 with first-week sales of 87,000 copies, becoming the group's highest-peaking album and their first album to reach the US top 10. The album remained at number five in its second week selling a further 81,000 copies. It also peaked at number one on the Billboard's Soundtracks and Kids Albums charts. The album was certified platinum by the Recording Industry Association of America (RIAA) on November 14, 2006, and as of August 2008, it had sold 1.4 million copies in the United States.

In the United Kingdom, the album debuted and peaked at number 51 on the UK Albums Chart on January 7, 2007. In its second week, it fell to number 68. In its third week, it rose two places to number 65. The album fell to number 80 in its fourth week, before leaving the top 100, spending a total of four weeks on the chart. Elsewhere, the album reached number 32 in New Zealand and Norway, number 55 in Ireland, number 58 in Italy, number 69 in Mexico, and number 93 in Australia.

== Track listing ==
| No. | Title | Writer(s) | Producer(s) | Length |
|---|---|---|---|---|
| 1. | "The Party's Just Begun" (Performed By The Cheetah Girls) | Matthew Gerrard; Robbie Nevil | Gerrard; Nevil | 03:11 |
| 2. | "Strut" (Performed By The Cheetah Girls) | Jamie Houston | Houston | 03:19 |
| 3. | "Dance with Me" (Performed By Drew Seeley Featuring Belinda) | Ray Cham; Charlene Licera | Ray "Sôl Survivor" Cham | 03:13 |
| 4. | "Why Wait" (Performed By Belinda) | Gerrard; Nevil | Gerrard | 03:02 |
| 5. | "A la Nanita Nana" (Performed By The Cheetah Girls With Belinda) | Traditional | David Lawrence | 02:13 |
| 6. | "Do Your Own Thing" (Performed By Raven-Symoné) | Gerrard; Nevil; Raven-Symoné | Gerrard | 03:18 |
| 7. | "It's Over" (Performed By The Cheetah Girls) | Lawrence; Faye Greenberg | Lawrence | 03:09 |
| 8. | "Step Up" (Performed By The Cheetah Girls) | Gerrard; Nevil | Gerrard; Nevil | 03:09 |
| 9. | "Amigas Cheetahs" (Performed By The Cheetah Girls with Belinda) | Houston; Will Robinson | Houston | 04:07 |
| 10. | "Cherish The Moment" (Performed By The Cheetah Girls) | Houston; Greg Curtis | Houston; Curtis | 03:27 |
| 11. | "Cheetah Sisters" (Barcelona Mix; Performed By The Cheetah Girls) | Houston | Houston | 02:43 |
| 12. | "Everyone's A Star" (Performed By Raven-Symoné) | Gerrard; Nevil; Raven-Symoné | Gerrard | 03:52 |
| 13. | "It's Gonna Be Alright" (Performed By Raven-Symoné) | Gerrard; Nevil; Raven-Symoné | Gerrard | 03:49 |

Special edition disc one (bonus tracks)
| No. | Title | Writer(s) | Length |
|---|---|---|---|
| 14. | "Route 66" (Performed By The Cheetah Girls) | Bobby Troup | 03:28 |
| 15. | "Strut" (Remix; Performed By The Cheetah Girls) | Houston | 03:16 |

Special edition disc two (concert DVD)
| No. | Title | Length |
|---|---|---|
| 1. | "The Party's Just Begun" |
| 2. | "Step Up" |
| 3. | "Cinderella" |
| 4. | "Strut" |
| 5. | "Cheetah Sisters" |
| 6. | "Exclusive interview with The Cheetah Girls" |

== Charts ==
=== Weekly charts ===
| Chart (2006–07) | Peak position |
|---|---|
| Australian Albums (ARIA) | 93 |
| Irish Albums (IRMA) | 55 |
| Italian Albums (FIMI) | 58 |
| Mexican Albums (Top 100 Mexico) | 68 |
| New Zealand Albums (RMNZ) | 32 |
| Norwegian Albums (VG-lista) | 32 |
| Scottish Albums (OCC) | 57 |
| UK Albums (OCC) | 59 |
| UK Soundtrack Albums (OCC) | 3 |
| US Billboard 200 | 5 |
| US Kid Albums (Billboard) | 1 |
| US Soundtrack Albums (Billboard) | 1 |

=== Year-end charts ===
| Chart (2006) | Position |
|---|---|
| US Billboard 200 | 84 |
| US Kids Albums (Billboard) | 2 |
| US Soundtracks (Billboard) | 5 |

| Chart (2007) | Position |
|---|---|
| US Billboard 200 | 75 |
| US Kids Albums (Billboard) | 5 |
| US Soundtracks (Billboard) | 6 |

== Certifications and sales ==
| Region | Certification | Certified units/sales |
|---|---|---|
| Argentina (CAPIF) | Gold | 20,000^{^} |
| Brazil | — | 6,000 |
| United Kingdom (BPI) | Silver | 60,000^{^} |
| United States (RIAA) | Platinum | 1,400,000 |
^{^} Shipments figures based on certification alone.

== Release history ==
| Region | Date | Format | Edition | Label | Ref. |
|---|---|---|---|---|---|
| United States | August 15, 2006 | CD; digital download | Standard | Walt Disney | |
| United States | October 10, 2006 | CD | Karaoke | Walt Disney | |
| United States | November 7, 2006 | 2-CD | Special | Walt Disney | |
| United Kingdom | November 7, 2006 | 2-CD | Special | Walt Disney | |
| United Kingdom | December 25, 2006 | CD | Standard | Walt Disney | |
