= The Cheetah Girls: One World (soundtrack) =

2008 album

Soundtrack album by The Cheetah Girls
- Released: August 19, 2008
- Recorded: 2007–2008
- Genres: Pop; hip hop; R&B
- Length: 37:01
- Labels: Walt Disney; Columbia
- Producers: Debra Martin Chase (exec.); Cheryl Hill (exec.); Steven Vincent (exec.); Kara Dioguardi; Niclas Molinder; Joacim Persson; Chris "Tricky" Stewart; Terius Nash; Antonina Armato; Tim James; Devrim Karaoglu; Matthew Gerrard; Robbie Nevil; Jamie Houston; Pelle Ankarberg; Nikki Hassman; Adam Anders; Andy Dodd; Juan Jacome; Karl Porter

The Cheetah Girls chronology
TCG (2007)	The Cheetah Girls: One World (2008)	The Cheetah Girls Soundcheck (2008)

Singles from The Cheetah Girls: One World
- 1. "One World" Released: June 24, 2008; 2. "Cheetah Love" Released: August 4, 2008

The Cheetah Girls: One World is the soundtrack album to the 2008 Disney Channel Original Movie of the same name. It was released on August 19, 2008, by Walt Disney Records and Columbia Records. The album was released in the UK on December 8, 2008. The CD for the album utilizes the CDVU+ feature.

The songs on the soundtrack are a diverse blend of pop, hip hop, and R&B with strong influences of Bollywood and bhangra. The album peaked at number thirteen on the US Billboard 200.

The album was preceded by two singles. "One World" was released on June 24, 2008, and "Cheetah Love" was released on August 4, 2008.

== Track listing ==
#	Title	Performer(s)	Scene	Length	Writers and producers
1	"Cheetah Love"	The Cheetah Girls	Dream concert sequence/On stage performing	3:14	Kara DioGuardi; Niclas Molinder; Joacim Persson; Chris "Tricky" Stewart; Terius Nash
2	"Dig a Little Deeper"	The Cheetah Girls	Restaurant/Audition for the movie	2:31	Antonina Armato; Tim James; Devrim Karaoglu
3	"Dance Me If You Can"	The Cheetah Girls, and Deepti Daryanani	Backstage movie	3:32	Matthew Gerrard; Robbie Nevil; Terius Nash
4	"Fly Away"	The Cheetah Girls	Town	3:30	Jamie Houston
5	"Stand Up"	Adrienne Bailon	Taxi when going to Chanel's place	3:10	Matthew Gerrard; Robbie Nevil; Adrienne Bailon
6	"What If"	Adrienne Bailon (credited as "Chanel")	Town	3:30	Matthew Gerrard; Robbie Nevil
7	"I'm the One"	The Cheetah Girls, Michael Steger, Rupak Ginn, and Kunal Sharma	Back of the palace for audition	2:58	Pelle Ankarberg; Kara DioGuardi; Niclas Monlinder; Joacim Persson
8	"No Place Like Us"	The Cheetah Girls	Around palace	3:25	Nikki Hassman; Adam Anders
9	"One World"	The Cheetah Girls, Deepti Daryanani, and Rupak Ginn	Town and palace	3:43	Matthew Gerrard; Robbie Nevil; Terius Nash
10	"Feels Like Love"	The Cheetah Girls, Michael Steger, Rupak Ginn, Kunal Sharma, and Deepti Daryanani	Swan boat ride/Romantic path	3:46	Adam Watts; Andy Dodd; Chris "Tricky" Stewart; Terius Nash
11	"Crazy on the Dance Floor"	Sabrina Bryan	Arriving to India	3:33	Sabrina Bryan; Juan Jacome; Karl Porter
12	"Circle Game"	Kiely Williams	Balcony before audition	2:49	Antonina Armato; Tim James; Kiely Williams

- Tracks 3, 7, 9 and 10 features vocals of other cast members.
- Track 11 was credited as "Getting Crazy on the Dance Floor" in the movie.
- Track 10 is featured only on the DVD/Blu-ray disc on the extended version.

== Disney Karaoke series ==
Disney Karaoke Series: One World

Compilation album (Karaoke) by The Cheetah Girls
- Released: September 16, 2008
- Genre: Pop
- Label: Walt Disney

The Disney Karaoke Series: One World is a karaoke album featuring songs from the Walt Disney Pictures movie The Cheetah Girls: One World. Disney Karaoke Series: One World, was released on September 16, 2008.

=== Track listing ===
Instrumental Versions
No.	Title	Length
1.	"Cheetah Love"
2.	"Dance Me If You Can"
3.	"Stand Up"
4.	"What If"
5.	"No Place Like Us"
6.	"One World"
7.	"Feels Like Love"
8.	"Circle Game"

Vocal Versions
No.	Title	Length
9.	"Cheetah Love"
10.	"Dance Me If You Can"
11.	"Stand Up"
12.	"What If"
13.	"No Place Like Us"
14.	"One World"
15.	"Feels Like Love"
16.	"Circle Game"

== Charts ==
=== Weekly charts ===
Chart (2008–09)	Peak position
Italian Albums (FIMI)	95
Mexican Albums (Top 100 Mexico)	81
UK Albums (OCC)	128
US Billboard 200	13
US Kid Albums (Billboard)	2
US Soundtrack Albums (Billboard)	3
