= Amigas Cheetahs =

Song by The Cheetah Girls featuring Belinda

from the album The Cheetah Girls 2 (soundtrack)
- Released: September 3, 2006 (digital download)
- Recorded: 2006
- Genre: Latin pop
- Length: 4:06
- Label: Walt Disney
- Songwriters: Jamie Houston, Will Robinson
- Producer: Jamie Houston

"Amigas Cheetahs" is a song from The Cheetah Girls 2 soundtrack.

== Music video ==
The Cheetah Girls did not shoot a video for the single because the song was from their film The Cheetah Girls 2 and was used to promote the movie. Because of that, the video for the song features clips from the movie and the girls dancing and singing in a special Barcelona music festival which is also a clip from the movie/musical. It premiered on August 26, 2006, on Disney Channel.

== Charts ==
Chart (2006)	Peak position
U.S. Billboard Bubbling Under Hot 100 Singles	10
U.S. Billboard Pop 100	87
