= Step Up (The Cheetah Girls song) =

Song by The Cheetah Girls

from the album The Cheetah Girls 2 (soundtrack)
- Released: August 17, 2006
- Recorded: 2006
- Genre: Dance-pop; R&B
- Length: 3:08
- Label: Walt Disney
- Songwriter(s): Matthew Gerrard, Robbie Nevil
- Producer(s): Matthew Gerrard, Robbie Nevil

"Step Up" is a song from The Cheetah Girls 2 soundtrack.

== Music video ==
The video for the song features the performance of "Step Up" in the movie and clips of the movie are intercut throughout the video. A clip of the video was shown on Live with Regis and Kelly two weeks prior to the actual premiere date of August 17, 2006 on Disney Channel.

== Charts ==
Chart (2006)	Peak position
U.S. Billboard Bubbling Under Hot 100 Singles	6
U.S. Billboard Pop 100	84
