= Cinderella (i5 song) =

Single by The Cheetah Girls

from the album The Cheetah Girls
- Released: August 12, 2003
- Genre: Pop; R&B
- Length: 3:19
- Label: Walt Disney
- Songwriters: Lindy Robbins and Kevin Savigar
- Producer: Sol Survivor

The Cheetah Girls singles chronology
"Cinderella" (2003)	"Cheetah Sisters" (2003)

"Cinderella" is a song recorded by the Cheetah Girls and released as their debut single from their self-titled 2003 soundtrack album The Cheetah Girls.

It was originally recorded by the girl group i5, from their 2000 self-titled album. It was subsequently covered by Play and later by The Cheetah Girls. It officially premiered on Radio Disney on July 23, 2003. The single was released officially on August 12 the same year. The song has a pop sound and was written by Lindy Robbins and Kevin Savigar.

== Music video ==
The video features the performance of "Cinderella" from the film and clips of the film are intercut throughout the video.

== Other covers ==
- The song was covered by Swedish girl group Play for their debut album in 2001.
- Taiwanese girl group S.H.E covered the song in Mandarin as "Half Sugarism" (半糖主義), a song form their fourth studio album Super Star.
- Thai singer Tata Young covered the song in 2004.
