= The Party's Just Begun =

Single by The Cheetah Girls

from the album The Cheetah Girls 2 (soundtrack)
- B-side: "Strut (Remix)"
- Released: June 5, 2006
- Genre: Dance-pop; R&B
- Length: 3:10
- Label: Walt Disney
- Songwriter(s): Matthew Gerrard, Robbie Nevil
- Producer(s): Matthew Gerrard, Robbie Nevil

The Cheetah Girls singles chronology
"If I Never Knew You" (2006)	"The Party's Just Begun" (2006)	"Strut" (2006)

"The Party's Just Begun" is the lead single from the soundtrack of The Cheetah Girls 2.

== Background and composition ==
The single officially premiered on Radio Disney on June 5, 2006 and was released officially for digital download on July 11. The song was written and produced by Matthew Gerrard and Robbie Nevil. The single debuted at #94 and peaked #85 on The Billboard Hot 100, making it their first song to chart.

=== Vocals ===
The recorded version of the song featured Raven-Symoné on lead vocals, with adlibs by Adrienne Bailon and background vocals by Sabrina Bryan and Kiely Williams. All the girls have 4 solo verses on the song. Due to Symoné's absences, Bryan and Williams took her verses. Both Bailon and Williams sing the chorus with background vocals by Bryan. Symoné joined the girls to perform the song live on Good Morning America, being the first and only time all four girls sing live together.

=== Ming Remix ===
The official remix of the song, known as the "Ming Remix" was released on February 10, 2009 as a promo single. It was previously released on the EP format of the original version of "The Party's Just Begun". This version of "The Party's Just Begun" not featured on any album(s) of The Cheetah Girls.

== Music video ==
The video for the song features the performance of "The Party's Just Begun" in the movie with clips from the movie intercut throughout the video. It premiered on June 22, 2006 on Disney Channel.

== Track listing ==
- U.S. CD single/U.K CD single
1. "The Party's Just Begun - 3:10
2. "Strut (Remix)" - 2:55
- U.K. Digital download
1. "The Party's Just Begun" - 3:10
- Italy EP
1. "The Party's Just Begun - 3:10
2. "Strut (remix)" - 3:12
3. "The Party's Just Begun (Ming Remix)" - 3:04

== Charts ==
Chart (2006–2007)	Peak position
Australia (ARIA)	72
New Zealand (Recorded Music NZ)	13
UK Singles (OCC)	53
U.S. Billboard Hot 100	85
U.S. Billboard Pop 100	62

== Release details ==
Region	Date	Label	Format
United States	June 5, 2006	Walt Disney Records	Radio Disney
United States	July 11, 2006	Walt Disney Records	Digital download
United States	January 8, 2007	Walt Disney Records	CD single
United Kingdom	January 8, 2007	Walt Disney Records	Digital download
United Kingdom	February 12, 2007	Walt Disney Records	CD single
Italy	January 8, 2007	Walt Disney Records	Digital EP
United States	February 10, 2009	Walt Disney Records	Digital download (Ming Remix)
