= The Cheetah Girls 2 =

2006 film directed by Kenny Ortega

- Promotional poster
- Genre: Comedy drama; Musical
- Based on: The Cheetah Girls by Deborah Gregory
- Written by: Alison Taylor; Bethesda Brown
- Directed by: Kenny Ortega
- Starring: Raven-Symoné; Adrienne Bailon; Sabrina Bryan; Kiely Williams; Belinda Peregrín; Lori Alter; Abel Folk; Golan Yosef; Lynn Whitfield
- Music by: David Lawrence
- Country of origin: United States
- Original language: English

Production
- Producers: José Luis Escolar; Cheryl Hill; Whitney Houston; Debra Martin Chase; Raven-Symoné
- Cinematography: Daniel Aranyo
- Editor: Charles Ireland
- Running time: 97 minutes
- Production companies: BrownHouse Productions; Martin Chase Productions

Original release
- Network: Disney Channel
- Release: August 25, 2006

Related
- The Cheetah Girls; The Cheetah Girls: One World; The Cheetah Girls: Next Gen

The Cheetah Girls 2 (also known as The Cheetah Girls: When In Spain in the working title) is a 2006 American musical comedy film directed by Kenny Ortega. It is the sequel to The Cheetah Girls (2003). The plot follows the talented teen quartet who take a whirlwind tour of Spain to pursue their dreams of pop superstardom.

The film's premiere received the highest ratings of all Disney Channel Movies at its time, a total of over 8.1 million viewers, beating the previous record holder, Cadet Kelly (7.8 million). The Cheetah Girls 2 is also the highest-rated film of The Cheetah Girls trilogy. The Cheetah Girls 2 was the highest-rated Disney Channel Original Movie of 2006 and, as of 2024, is the joint-eighth-highest-rated Disney Channel Original Movie of all time.

== Plot ==
The film begins in Manhattan, two years after the events of the first film, The Cheetah Girls. The girls have just completed their junior year, and are performing at a Graduation Party for the Manhattan Magnet's Class of 2006 ("The Party's Just Begun").

Later, while having a sleep-over at Galleria's home, Chanel tells the girls that her mother, Juanita, is planning a trip to Barcelona, Spain, where she and Chanel will be visiting Luc, Juanita's boyfriend. Aqua sees a shooting star and the girls make a wish together—to go to Spain with Chanel. A gust of wind flips one of the girls’ magazine pages to an ad for a Barcelona music festival. Galleria enters The Cheetah Girls in to perform and, the next day, her mother Dorothea, Juanita, and the rest of the girls all decide to travel to Spain together.

When the girls arrive in Barcelona, they meet Angel, a mysterious guitar player who accompanies them around Barcelona as they sing to the entire city ("Strut"). The next day, the girls successfully audition for the festival ("Cheetah Sisters").

The following day, they meet Joaquin, Luc's godson and a dancer who becomes interested in Dorinda. Dorinda visits his studio where he teaches her ballroom tango ("Dance With Me").

That night, Joaquin takes the Cheetahs to The Dancing Cat, a local Spanish night club where all of the new artists perform their songs ("Why Wait") ("A La Nanita Nana"). They meet and befriend Marisol (Belinda), a beloved Spanish pop star, who will also compete in the Music Festival, and her momager, Lola. Lola appears nice and wins the Cheetah Girls' affection, but secretly plans a scheme to break up the girls, as they pose a threat to her daughter's chances in the competition. Meanwhile, Aqua and Dorothea have been designing clothes, Juanita is trying to get a proposal out of Luc, Dorinda is teaching hip hop to Joaquin's class, and Galleria is the only one focused on the competition, as she is writing a song called, "Amigas Cheetahs", which they will sing at the competition ("Do Your Own Thing").

Galleria notices that everyone is getting involved in other activities except for her ("It's Over"), and eventually decides to take a train to Paris, where she can meet up with her father and go home. While at a train station, the other three girls find Galleria and convince her to stay after promising to stay focused. Later, Chanel overhears Juanita talking to Dorothea about how she believes that Luc doesn't want to marry her because Chanel doesn't like him. Luc later proposes to Juanita, after Chanel gives him permission, and she gladly accepts. Luc tells Chanel that she can stay in New York with her friends for her upcoming senior year.

After the Cheetah Girls finish performing at The Dancing Cat ("Step Up"), Lola convinces the club manager to pay the Cheetah Girls. The competition will only allow amateur performs to compete, and accepting payment disqualified them. They return the money and Angel, who was present during the entire exchange, investigates.

Lola suggests that since the Cheetah Girls cannot perform as a group, Chanel should perform with Marisol instead. Right before Chanel is going to perform with Marisol, the Festival Director informs that the Cheetah Girls are able to perform after speaking to Angel, who is revealed to be his nephew. He informed the director of Lola’s attempts, and his uncle reinstates the group. Marisol stands up to her mother and drops out of the competition. The Cheetah Girls then perform "Amigas Cheetahs" and bring Marisol onto the stage, along with Joaquin's dancing crew, Angel on the guitar and the Director on the trumpet, and the film ends.

In an alternate ending, Juanita and Luc get married ("Cherish the Moment"). This scene is not shown in TV or sing-along versions.

== Cast ==
- Raven-Symoné as Galleria "Bubbles" Garibaldi, the leader of The Cheetah Girls
- Adrienne Bailon as Chanel "Chuchie" Simmons, the member of The Cheetah Girls
- Sabrina Bryan as Dorinda "Do" Thomas, the member of The Cheetah Girls
- Kiely Williams as Aquanette "Aqua" Walker, the member of The Cheetah Girls
- Belinda Peregrín as Marisol Durán
- Lynn Whitfield as Dorothea Garibaldi, Galleria's mother
- Lori Alter as Juanita Simmons, Chanel's mother
- Abel Folk as Luc, Juanita's fiance-then-husband, Joaquin's godfather, and Chanel's stepfather.
- Golan Yosef as Joaquín, Dorinda's love interest. Like Dorinda, he is a talented dancer.
- Kim Manning as Lola Durán, Marisol's mother and manager, and the main antagonist of the film. She plans to break up the Cheetah Girls in order to ensure that her daughter wins the competition and becomes a star.
- Peter Vives as Ángel, a mysterious guitar player.

== Production ==
The entire film, including the scenes that took place in New York City, was shot on location in Barcelona, Spain during the spring of 2006.

== Soundtrack ==
The soundtrack was released on August 15, 2006. It debuted at #5 on the Billboard 200 and sold over 1.4 million copies to date.

=== Track listing ===
1. "The Party's Just Begun" – The Cheetah Girls
2. "Strut" – The Cheetah Girls featuring Peter Vives
3. "Dance With Me" – Drew Seeley featuring Belinda
4. "Why Wait?" – Belinda
5. "A La Nanita Nana" – Adrienne Bailon and Belinda featuring The Cheetah Girls
6. "Do Your Own Thing" – Raven-Symoné
7. "It's Over" – The Cheetah Girls
8. "Step Up" – The Cheetah Girls
9. "Amigas Cheetahs" – The Cheetah Girls featuring Belinda
10. "Cherish the Moment" – The Cheetah Girls
11. "Cheetah Sisters (Barcelona Mix)" – The Cheetah Girls
12. "Everyone's a Star" – Raven-Symoné
13. "It's Gonna Be Alright" – Raven-Symoné
14. "Studio Session with The Cheetah Girls" – Bonus video track

=== Special editions ===
==== Bonus tracks ====
1. "Route 66" – The Cheetah Girls
2. "Strut (Ming Mix)" – The Cheetah Girls

==== Disneyland concert DVD tracks ====
All songs performed by the Cheetah Girls

1. "The Party's Just Begun"
2. "Step Up"
3. "Cinderella"
4. "Strut"
5. "Cheetah Sisters"

== Reception ==
The premiere of the movie became Disney Channel's highest-rated Disney Channel Original Movie with a total of 8.1 million viewers, beating the previous record holder Cadet Kelly, which had a total of 7.8 million viewers. This was then beat by Jump In!, which closely beat it with 8.2 million viewers. Currently, the highest-rated DCOM is High School Musical 2 with 17.2 million viewers. A repeat during the weekend gathered a massive 7.82 million viewers, tallying the total number of viewers to 15.9 million viewers. The Cheetah Girls 2 is currently the sixth-highest-viewed DCOM as of September 2010. It was the highest-viewed DCOM of 2006, following the footsteps of the first film, which was the highest-viewed of 2003. Feedback to the movie has been generally positive for the target audience.

Ultimate Disney said "this film lays off on some of the annoyances found in the first film. The Cheetah Girls have grown up and thus grown out of the annoying tweenage girl characterizations that are now seen in the snobby minor characters of Hannah Montana". The review went on to say "the nicest thing about this sequel is that on screen, the Cheetah Girls still seem to exemplify a deep friendship among a group of young women. The chemistry between the central actresses is strong, making them a believable group of friends who appear to be having a lot of fun making this movie".

About.com was also favourable, commenting "The Cheetah Girls 2 contains the expected cheesiness, drama, and unrealistic plot, but I have to admit that I was totally taken in". Common Sense Media wrote that "the characters have aged, and their flair for drama has taken a backseat to introspective decision making and goal setting, making them more realistic (and positive) role models".

In the United Kingdom, 282,000 viewers tuned in on its premiere night, becoming #1 of the week on Disney Channel UK.

== Release ==
Country / Region	Network(s)	Premiere
United States	Disney Channel	August 25, 2006
Canada	Family	September 1, 2006
United Kingdom	Disney Channel UK	September 29, 2006
Italy	Disney Channel Italy	December 2, 2006
Argentina	Disney Channel Latin America	December 3, 2006
Mexico	Disney Channel Latin America	December 3, 2006
Taiwan	Disney Channel Taiwan	December 8, 2006
South Africa	Disney Channel South Africa	December 9, 2006
Poland	Disney Channel Poland	December 9, 2006
Brazil	Disney Channel Latin America	December 10, 2006
Spain	Disney Channel Spain	December 16, 2006
France	Disney Channel France	December 19, 2006
Belgium	Disney Channel Belgium	December 19, 2006
Japan	Disney Channel Japan	January 1, 2007
Brunei	Disney Channel Asia	January 27, 2007
Cambodia	Disney Channel Asia	January 27, 2007
Hong Kong	Disney Channel Asia	January 27, 2007
Indonesia	Disney Channel Asia	January 27, 2007
South Korea	Disney Channel Asia	January 27, 2007
Malaysia	Disney Channel Asia	January 27, 2007
Palau	Disney Channel Asia	January 27, 2007
Philippines	Disney Channel Asia	January 27, 2007
Singapore	Disney Channel Asia	January 27, 2007
Thailand	Disney Channel Asia	January 27, 2007
Vietnam	Disney Channel Asia	January 27, 2007
Australia	Disney Channel Australia	January 28, 2007
India	Disney Channel India	July 28, 2007
Romania	Disney Channel Romania	January 23, 2010

=== DVD release ===
- The Cheetah Girls 2: Cheetah-Licious Edition was released on November 28, 2006. The Region 1 DVD includes Spanish audio tracks.
- The Cheetah Girls 2 – As Feras da Música DVD was released in Brazil on April 11, 2007.
- The Cheetah Girls 2: Cheetah-Licious Edition DVD was released in the UK on May 21, 2007.
- The Cheetah Girls 2 DVD was released in Italy on May 23, 2007, with audio tracks in Italian, German, English, Spanish and French and with extra features.
- The Cheetah Girls 2: Cheetah-Licious Edition DVD was released in Hong Kong on June 26, 2007. The Region 3 DVD includes audio tracks in English, Mandarin, Japanese, Spanish and Portuguese, and subtitles in English, Traditional Chinese, Malay, Indonesian, Spanish, and Portuguese.

The DVD debuted at #10 on Billboard's "Top DVD sales" chart in the U.S., where it has sold nearly one million copies since its release and has grossed over $17 million in revenue. The Cheetah Girls 2 (2006) - Financial Information

== Awards ==
- 2007 – Nominated; Imagen Awards Imagen Award for Best Director – Film (Kenny Ortega)
- 2007 – Nominated; Motion Picture Sound Editors Golden Reel Award for Best Sound Editing in Music for Television – Long Form (Carli Barber; music editor)
