= The Cheetah Girls (soundtrack) =

Soundtrack album by The Cheetah Girls and various artists
- Released: August 12, 2003
- Recorded: 2002
- Genres: R&B; pop
- Length: 22:31
- Label: Walt Disney Records
- Producers: Debra Martin Chase (also exec.); Whitney Houston (exec.); Antonina Armato; Ray Cham; Tim James

The Cheetah Girls and various artists chronology
The Cheetah Girls (2003)	Cheetah-licious Christmas (2005)

Singles from The Cheetah Girls
- 1. "Cinderella" Released: August 12, 2003

The Cheetah Girls is the soundtrack album to the 2003 Disney Channel Original Movie of the same name. It was released on August 12, 2003, on compact disc and audio cassette by Walt Disney Records. The album was produced by Antonina Armato, Ray Cham, Tim James and executive produced by Debra Martin Chase and Whitney Houston. The album features appearances from Sonic Chaos, Char, and Hope 7.

The album was certified Double Platinum in the United States on June 7, 2005, after selling more than 2 million copies in the US alone. It is one of the biggest selling albums from Walt Disney Records ever, along with the High School Musical soundtrack and the Hannah Montana season 1 soundtrack.

== Background and release ==
Although there had been music recorded for The Cheetah Girls film, there were originally no plans to release said music commercially since Disney Channel's previous original films never had soundtracks before. Debra Martin Chase was able to convince Disney to create new contracts for the film's actresses and release the film's music as a soundtrack.

A special edition titled "The Cheetah Girls - Special Edition Soundtrack" was released on June 22, 2004, featuring two brand new remixes of "Cinderella" and "Girl Power" with eight karaoke tracks. The special edition credits the song, "End of the Line", to Hope 7, while the original release credits the song to Christi Mac. The reason for this is that Christi Mac is really the alias of Kristi McClave, the lead singer of Hope 7. McClave sang both this song and "Breakthrough" on the original soundtrack. On December 25, 2006, the original soundtrack was released digitally to the iTunes store in the United Kingdom.

== Critical reception ==
Professional ratings
Review scores
Source	Rating
Allmusic	3.5/5 stars

Johnny Loftus from Allmusic reviewed the album stating: "From the Disney Channel comes a TV movie adaptation of Deborah Gregory's Cheetah Girls book series. It's the continuing adventures of a smart, sassy singing group as they make their way in the pop music world with nothing but their wits and musical chops to guide them. Along the way, they live a little, rock a little, and learn a lot". Common Sense Media's review of the album complimented The Cheetah Girls' singing, but called the production "prefabricated" and generally disapproved of the musical presentation.

== Track listing ==
Standard edition
No.	Title	Recording Artist(s)	Length
1.	"Cheetah Sisters"	The Cheetah Girls	3:07
2.	"Cinderella"	The Cheetah Girls	3:21
3.	"Girl Power"	The Cheetah Girls	2:48
4.	"Together We Can"	The Cheetah Girls	1:36
5.	"C'mon"	Sonic Chaos	1:25
6.	"Girlfriend"	Char	3:30
7.	"Breakthrough"	Hope7	2:44
8.	"End Of The Line"	Christi Mac	1:39
Total length:			22:31

Special edition
No.	Title	Recording Artist(s)	Length
9.	"Cinderella" (Dream mix)	The Cheetah Girls	3:34
10.	"Girl Power" (Meow mix)	The Cheetah Girls	2:55
11.	"Cheetah Sisters"	Instrumental karaoke	3:22
12.	"Cinderella"	Instrumental karaoke	3:25
13.	"Girl Power"	Instrumental karaoke	2:52
14.	"Together We Can"	Instrumental karaoke	1:50
15.	"C'mon"	Instrumental karaoke	1:42
16.	"Girlfriend"	Instrumental karaoke	3:31
17.	"Breakthrough"	Instrumental karaoke	3:00
18.	"End of The Line"	Instrumental karaoke	1:52
Total length:			50:16

== Chart performance ==
The album charted at number one on the Billboard Kid Album charts on October 25, 2003. The album spent a total of sixty-five weeks on the chart. The special edition of the album charted at number three on the Billboard Kid Album charts on July 10, 2004.

== Charts ==
=== Weekly charts ===
Chart (2003–2007)	Peak position
Irish Albums (IRMA)	82
Italian Albums (FIMI)	29
US Billboard 200	33
US Kid Albums (Billboard)	1
US Soundtrack Albums (Billboard)	1

=== Year-end charts ===
Chart (2003)	Position
US Soundtrack Albums (Billboard)	22
Chart (2004)	Position
US Billboard 200	58
US Soundtrack Albums (Billboard)	2

== Certifications ==
Region	Certification	Certified units/sales
United States (RIAA)	2× Platinum	2,000,000^{^}
^{^} Shipments figures based on certification alone.

== Release history ==
Region	Date	Format	Version	Label	Ref
United States	August 12, 2003	CD	Original Soundtrack	Walt Disney Records	
United States	June 22, 2004	CD	Special Edition	Walt Disney Records	
United Kingdom	December 25, 2006	Digital Download	Original Soundtrack	Walt Disney Records	
