= The Cheetah Girls (group) =

American girl group (2002–2008)

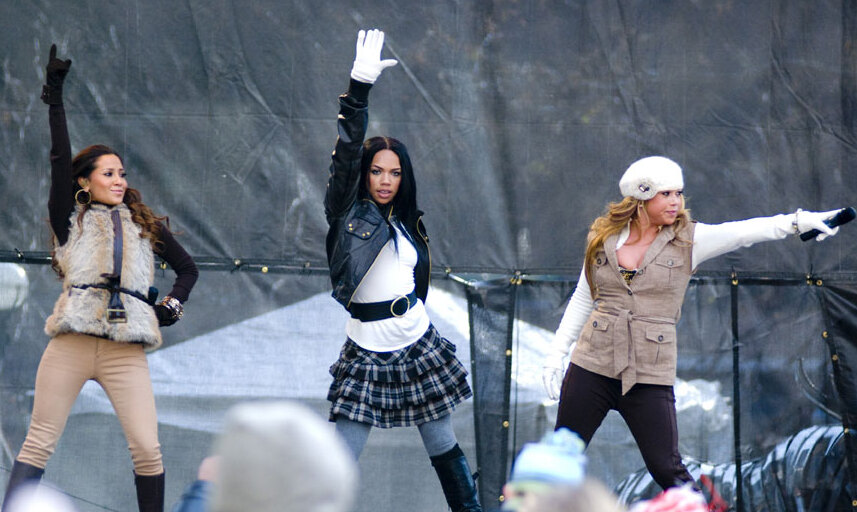
- The Cheetah Girls performing at Magnificent Mile Lights Festival in November 2008 (L–R): Adrienne Bailon, Kiely Williams, and Sabrina Bryan

Background information
- Genres: R&B; pop; hip hop
- Years active: 2002–2008
- Labels: Walt Disney; Hollywood
- Past members: Adrienne Bailon; Kiely Williams; Sabrina Bryan; Raven-Symoné

The Cheetah Girls were an American girl group formed in 2002, primarily consisting of Adrienne Bailon, Kiely Williams, and Sabrina Bryan. Raven-Symoné contributed as a member to the group's first two musical films and their respective soundtracks.

The group began as a fictional quartet for the eponymous Disney Channel original musical film, which premiered in 2003. The film became the highest-rated premiere for a Disney Channel Original Movie at the time and its soundtrack was certified double platinum by the RIAA. Following the success of the film, members Bailon, Williams, and Bryan began recording as a real vocal group while Symoné opted to focus on solo projects. In 2005, the trio released their debut studio album Cheetah-licious Christmas. The following year, Symoné returned for the sequel film The Cheetah Girls 2 and its platinum certified soundtrack, which would be her final work with the group. In 2007, the group released their second studio album TCG. In 2008, the group was featured in their final musical film The Cheetah Girls: One World.

The Cheetah Girls spawned numerous merchandise lines which included clothing, dolls, and video games. The group embarked on three North American tours: Cheetah-licious Christmas Tour, The Party's Just Begun Tour, and One World Tour. They have sold over 11 million records worldwide.

== Career ==
=== 2002–2004: The Cheetah Girls ===
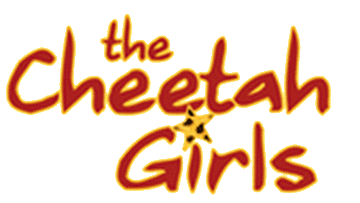
The Cheetah Girls franchise logo

On August 15, 2003, the musical television film The Cheetah Girls premiered on Disney Channel. It was based on the best-selling series of young adult books of the same name by Deborah Gregory and was filmed in October and November 2002. The film starred Raven-Symoné as Galleria, Sabrina Byran as Dorinda, Adrienne Bailon as Chanel, and Kiely Williams as Aquanette. Singer Solange Knowles was originally cast in the role of Aquanette, but Knowles pulled out of the film due to wanting to focus on the release of her debut album Solo Star. Williams initially auditioned for the role of Galleria, but did not get the part, and was subsequently offered the role of Aquanette when Knowles pulled out. Bailon and Williams were originally in the girl group 3LW. Upon release, the film was the number one rated basic cable telecast and premiered to 6.5 million viewers, a record for Disney at the time. The movie's DVD sold over 800,000 copies. Several songs were recorded for the film, and though there had been no contractual plans for these songs to be released commercially, producer Debra Martin Chase was able to convince Disney to create new contracts and release the film's music as a soundtrack. The soundtrack was released on August 12, 2003. It peaked at number 33 on the Billboard 200 and was certified double platinum by the RIAA. "Cinderella" was released as the sole single from the album.

A sitcom based on The Cheetah Girls was in development as a potential TV series for ABC in their 2004–2005 season. ABC was set to put the show into production in early 2004, with discussions also being held to write a role for fellow 3LW member, Jessica Benson. ABC did not pick up the series and a pilot for the show was not filmed.

=== 2005–2006: Cheetah-licious Christmas and The Cheetah Girls 2 ===
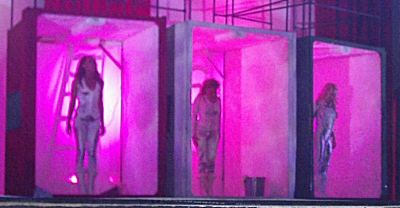
The Cheetah Girls performing during the Cheetah-licious Christmas tour in 2005

Following the success of the film, Disney began developing The Cheetah Girls as a real-life recording group. Symoné opted to focus on solo projects, leaving a trio of Bailon, Williams, and Bryan. As a group, the members were referred to by both their real names and their character names from the film. The group's first release as a trio and recording act was a cover of the Hercules soundtrack song "I Won't Say (I'm in Love)" video choreographed by Lena Giroux which appeared on Disneymania 3 in February 2005. In October 2005, the group released their debut record under Walt Disney Records, Cheetah-licious Christmas. The holiday album includes classic Christmas songs as well as several original songs, one of which was co-written by all three girls. The album peaked at number 74 on the Billboard 200 and sold over 375,000 copies as of June 2008. The album produced the single "Cheetah-licious Christmas". In November, the group contributed a cover of "Shake a Tail Feather" to the soundtrack of the film Chicken Little, which was released as a single in France. In December, the group embarked on their first headlining tour, the Cheetah-licious Christmas Tour choreographed by Lena Giroux.

In April 2006, the group's cover of "If I Never Knew You" from 1995's Pocahontas was released as a single from the compilation Disneymania 4. That same month, the group began filming the sequel musical film The Cheetah Girls 2. Raven-Symoné returned for the film, which was shot on location in Barcelona, Spain. The Cheetah Girls 2 premiered on August 26, 2006, and received over 8.1 million viewers, making it the highest-rated premiere for a Disney Channel Original Movie at the time. The film's soundtrack album was released on August 15, 2006, ten days before the film's premiere. It peaked at number 5 on the Billboard 200 and was certified platinum by the RIAA. The soundtrack was preceded by the single "The Party's Just Begun", which peaked at number 13 in New Zealand and at 85 on the U.S. Billboard Hot 100. The album's second single, "Strut", peaked at number 55 on the Billboard Hot 100. The soundtrack was mainly promoted with performances by the group as a three-piece; Raven-Symoné joined the group for a performance of "The Party's Just Begun" on Good Morning America on August 23, 2006, which was her only live performance with the group. In October 2006, the group released a cover of "Route 66". The song was used to promote the Cars DVD release and was included on the special edition of The Cheetah Girls 2 soundtrack which was released the following month.

Following the film's premiere, the group embarked on The Party's Just Begun Tour choreographed and creatively directed by Lena Giroux from September 2006 to March 2007. The tour grossed over $43 million USD. Two of the concert dates were recorded for the live album, In Concert: The Party's Just Begun Tour, which was released July 10, 2007.

=== 2007–2008: TCG, The Cheetah Girls: One World, and disbandment ===
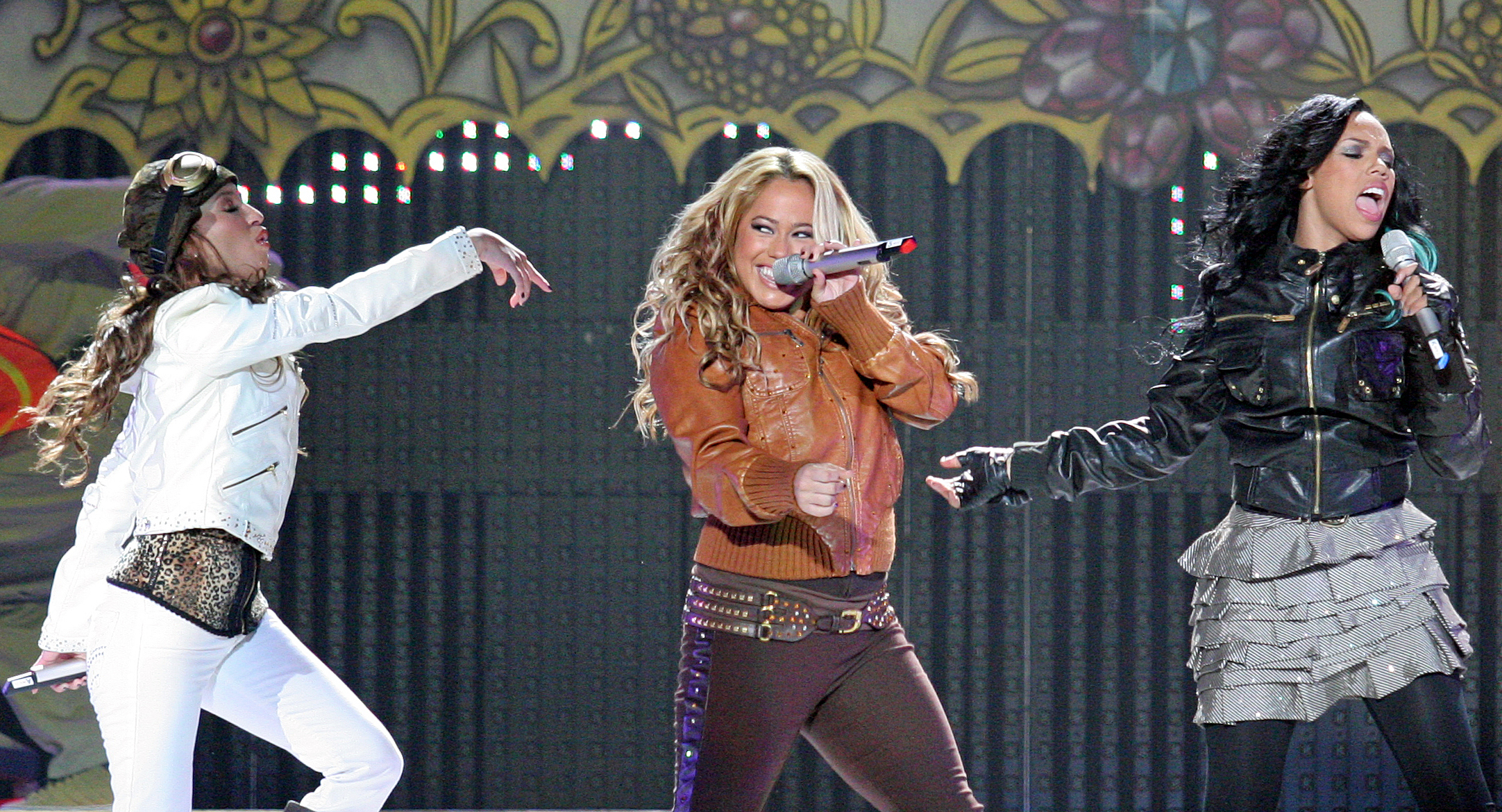
The Cheetah Girls performing in October 2008

In March 2007, the group's cover of "So This Is Love" from Cinderella was included on Disneymania 5. While touring on The Party's Just Begun Tour, the group worked on material for a second studio album. Bailon noted: "We'll be making a real album, not a soundtrack - it's important for people to see us as a real musical group." Sabrina Bryan stated that they hoped to gather an audience of older fans while simultaneously staying true to their younger fan base.

On September 25, 2007, the group released their second studio album TCG. The album peaked at number 44 on the Billboard 200 and sold over 120,000 copies by June of the following year. The album was preceded by the single "So Bring It On" on August 25, 2007; the song was the theme of Twitches Too. "Fuego" was released as the second single from the album and peaked at number 27 on Billboard's Hot Dance Club Play chart.

The third Cheetah Girls film was announced for pre-production in early 2007. Adrienne Bailon revealed in March 2007 that the film would be filmed for a three-month period in India and that it would have a theme centered around Bollywood. Raven-Symoné confirmed in August 2007 that she would not appear in the third film, and later revealed that this was due to her feeling "excluded" and "ostracized" on the set of the second film. The group began filming their third and final Cheetah Girls movie, The Cheetah Girls: One World, in January 2008. The group covered "Someday My Prince Will Come" which appeared on Disneymania 6 in May. The Cheetah Girls: One World premiered on August 22, 2008 and its soundtrack was released on August 19. While the film was a ratings hit, debuting with 6.2 million viewers, the soundtrack failed to match the success of their previous soundtrack releases and sold 140,000 copies in its first two months. In the fall of 2008, the group embarked on the One World Tour. In late December 2008, the group disbanded.

=== 2026–Present: The Cheetah Girls: New Gen ===
On July 8, 2026, Raven-Symoné announced the fourth instalment to the franchise The Cheetah Girls: Next Gen with Symone returning as executive producer and lead role as Galleria, Adrienne Bailon returning as Chanel, and Bryan returning in a special appearance as Dorinda.Kiely Williams will not be reprising her role in the fourth instalment. The film will follow Galleria and Chanel taking Faith, Galleria's daughter, Dior, Chanel's sister and their friends to Africa where they'll volunteer at a wildlife sanctuary. Meanwhile, the new generation of Cheetahs will "test their friendship, find their voice, and discover the true Cheetah spirit as they save the preserve and ultimately take the stage as the new Cheetah Girls".

== Legacy ==
The Cheetah Girls were the first multi-ethnic girl music group to come out of the Disney Channel. The group featured young women of various races, backgrounds, and sizes, and also showcased music from cultures around the world. The second movie took the group to Spain; songs such as "Amigas Cheetahs" and "Fuego" featured Spanish lyrics and utilized costumes that are typical of Spanish culture.

The group became promiment alongside The Pussycat Dolls, a multi-ethnic ensemble marketed toward a more mature audience. In contrast, The Cheetah Girls utilized age-appropriate choreography and fashion, which broadened their appeal among tweens and parents alike. The central theme of the films suggests that professional success is attainable as long as personal relationships remain the priority. The franchise would also introduce some concepts of empowerment and female solidarity, feminism, to its young viewers.

Celebrities such as Fifth Harmony, The McClain Sisters, Zendaya, Olivia Holt, Coco Jones and Brittany O'Grady have mentioned The Cheetah Girls as idols or an inspiration. Musicians Cardi B and North West have also paid homage to The Cheetah Girls.

== Filmography ==
Year	Title	Roles	Notes
2003	The Cheetah Girls	Raven-Symoné as Galleria Garibaldi, Adrienne Bailon as Chanel Simmons, Sabrina Bryan as Dorinda Thomas and Kiely Williams as Aquanette Walker	Filmed in Toronto, Ontario, Canada and Manhattan, New York City
2006	The Cheetah Girls 2	Raven-Symoné as Galleria Garibaldi, Adrienne Bailon as Chanel Simmons, Sabrina Bryan as Dorinda Thomas and Kiely Williams as Aquanette Walker	Filmed in Barcelona, Spain
2008	The Cheetah Girls: One World	Adrienne Bailon as Chanel Simmons, Sabrina Bryan as Dorinda Thomas, and Kiely Williams as Aquanette Walker	Filmed in Udaipur, India
2027	The Cheetah Girls: Next Gen	Raven-Symoné as Galleria Garibaldi, Adrienne Bailon as Chanel Simmons, and Sabrina Bryan as Dorinda Thomas	Filmed in South Africa

== Discography ==
=== Albums ===
- Cheetah-licious Christmas (2005)
- TCG (2007)

=== Soundtracks ===
- The Cheetah Girls (2003)
- The Cheetah Girls 2 (2006)
- The Cheetah Girls: One World (2008)

== Tours ==
- Cheetah-licious Christmas Tour (2005)
- The Party's Just Begun Tour (2006–2007)
- The One World Tour (2008)

== Merchandise ==
There are Cheetah Girls-based clothing lines, toys, and video games. The clothing line was made available in Sears stores. A doll line was released in 2007, inspired by the Disney Channel Original Movies.

Several video games featuring the group were released for the Game Boy Advance and Nintendo DS, including The Cheetah Girls, The Cheetah Girls: Pop Star Sensations, and The Cheetah Girls: Passport to Stardom.

Book series

The Cheetah Girls is a book series that was written by Deborah Gregory and first published in 1999. The original series was the inspiration for the first movie; later books were released as movie tie-ins. The tie-ins include: The Cheetah Girls Junior Novel (released October 25, 2004; written by Deborah Gregory), The Cheetah Girls 2 Junior Novel (released July 18, 2006; written by Alice Alfonsi) and The Cheetah Girls: One World Junior Novel (released July 22, 2008; written by Kirsten Thorpe).

== See also ==
- 3LW
