= List of songs recorded by Corbin Bleu =

Corbin Bleu Logo

A complete list of songs by the American Pop/R&B singer, Corbin Bleu.

== Album Songs ==
All songs that appear on studio albums released by Corbin Bleu.

A

Song	Album	Year
"Angel Cry"	Speed of Light	2009

C

Song	Album	Year
"Circles"	Flight 29 Down	2006
"Celebrate You"	Speed of Light	2009
"Champion"	Speed of Light	2009
"Close"	Speed of Light	2009

D

Song	Album	Year
"Deal With It"	Another Side	2007

F

Song	Album	Year
"Fear of Flying"	Speed of Light	2009

H

Song	Album	Year
"Homework"	Another Side	2007

I

Song	Album	Year
"I Get Lonely"	Another Side	2007

M

Song	Album	Year
"Marchin'"	Another Side	2007
"Mixed Up"	Another Side	2007
"Moments that Matter"	Speed of Light	2009
"My Everything"	Speed of Light	2009

N

Song	Album	Year
"Never Met a Girl Like You"	Another Side	2007

P

Song	Album	Year
"Paralyzed"	Speed of Light	2009
"Push it to the Limit"	Another Side/Jump In!	2007

R

Song	Album	Year
"Rock 2 It"	Speed of Light	2009
"Roll With You"	Another Side	2007

S

Song	Album	Year
"She Could Be"	Another Side	2007
"Speed of Light"	Speed of Light	2009
"Still There For Me"	Another Side	2007
"Stop"	Another Side	2007

W

Song	Album	Year
"We Come to Party"	Another Side	2007
"Whatever It Takes"	Speed of Light	2009
"Willing to Go"	Speed of Light	2009

== Bonus tracks ==
All songs that are released as bonus tracks on a studio album released by Corbin Bleu.

Song	Album	Year
"Bodyshock"	Speed of Light	2009
"If She Says Yeah"	Another Side	2007
"Shake It Off"	Another Side	2007

== Soundtrack Releases ==
All songs in which Corbin Bleu have recorded for film on soundtrack releases.

Year	Song	Album
2006	"Circles"	Flight 29 Down
2006	"We're All in This Together" (with cast of High School Musical)	High School Musical
2007	"This Christmastime"	Disney Channel Holiday
2007	"Two Worlds"	DisneyMania 5
2007	"All for One" (with cast of High School Musical 2)	High School Musical 2
2007	"Everyday" (with cast of High School Musical 2)	High School Musical 2
2007	"I Don't Dance" (with Lucas Grabeel)	High School Musical 2
2007	"What Time Is It?" (with cast of High School Musical 2)	High School Musical 2
2007	"Work This Out" (with cast of High School Musical 2)	High School Musical 2
2008	"Run it Back Again"	Radio Disney Jams 10/Disney Channel Playlist
2008	"A Night to Remember" (with cast of High School Musical 3: Senior Year)	High School Musical 3: Senior Year
2008	"The Boys Are Back" (with Zac Efron)	High School Musical 3: Senior Year
2008	"High School Musical" (with cast of High School Musical 3: Senior Year)	High School Musical 3: Senior Year

== Released Covers ==
Song	Original Artist	Album	Year
"Two Worlds"	Phil Collins	Tarzan soundtrack	2000

== See also ==
- Corbin Bleu
- Corbin Bleu discography
