= Corbin Bleu =

American actor (born 1989)

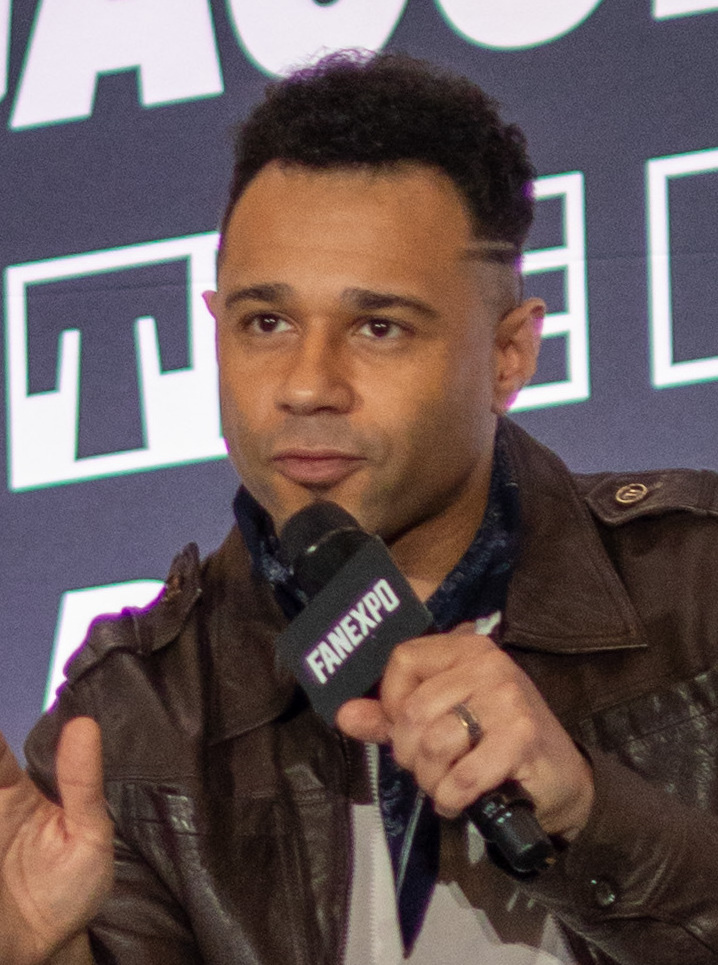
- Bleu in 2025
- Born: Corbin Bleu Reivers; February 21, 1989 (age 37); New York City, U.S.
- Education: Los Angeles County High School for the Arts; Fiorello H. LaGuardia High School
- Occupations: Actor; singer; songwriter; dancer
- Years active: 1996–present
- Spouse: Sasha Clements (m. 2016)
- Father: David Reivers
- Musical career
- Origin: Los Angeles, California, U.S.
- Genres: Pop; R&B; dance; dance-pop; teen pop; electropop; pop rock
- Instruments: Vocals; piano
- Works: Discography; list of songs
- Years active: 2006–present
- Labels: Walt Disney; Hollywood; Ghostlight
- Website: www.corbinbleu.com

Corbin Bleu Reivers (/bluː/ BLOO; born February 21, 1989) is an American actor and singer. He began acting professionally in the late 1990s before rising to prominence in the late 2000s for his leading role as Chad Danforth in the High School Musical trilogy (2006–2008). Songs from the films also charted worldwide, with the song "I Don't Dance" peaking inside the Top 70 of the Billboard Hot 100. During this time, he also starred in the Disney Channel Original Movie Jump In! (2007) and the film To Write Love on Her Arms (2015). He competed in the 17th season of Dancing with the Stars.

Bleu has also pursued a music career and his debut album Another Side was released in 2007, which included the hit "Push It to the Limit". The album debuted and peaked at number 36 on the U.S. Billboard 200 album chart, selling 18,000 copies in its first week. His second album, Speed of Light, was released in 2009. He returned to television, starring in the short-lived Ashton Kutcher–produced CW series The Beautiful Life: TBL (2009) and the movie Free Style (2009). He has appeared in the films The Little Engine That Could (2011), Scary or Die (2012), Nurse 3D (2013), Sugar (2013), The Monkey's Paw (2013), Walk. Ride. Rodeo. (2019), Remember Me: The Mahalia Jackson Story (2022), and Camp Hideout (2023).

In 2010, Bleu made his Broadway debut as Usnavi in the musical In the Heights. In 2012, he returned to Broadway in the revival of Godspell. In 2013, he was cast as Jeffrey King in the short-lived online revival of the daytime soap One Life to Live. In 2016, Bleu played Ted Hanover in the Broadway company of Holiday Inn, the New Irving Berlin Musical. He subsequently signed a recording contract with Ghostlight Records, (Note: Also known as Sh-K-Boom Records.) to distribute his Holiday Inn soundtrack music, released in 2017. In 2019, he returned to play Bill Calhoun/Lucentio in the Broadway company of Kiss Me, Kate. He subsequently signed a recording contract with Ghostlight Records, to distribute his Kiss Me, Kate soundtrack music, released on June 7, 2019. Bleu later made his West End debut in the European premiere of The Great Gatsby at the London Coliseum as Nick Carraway in April 2025 which earned him a Laurence Olivier Awards nomination.

== Early life and education ==
Corbin Bleu was born in the New York City borough of Brooklyn, the son of Martha (née Callari) and David Reivers (born 1958), an actor. His mother is Italian-American and his father is Jamaican-American. He has three younger sisters. As a child, Bleu studied dance for several years, focusing on ballet and jazz. His great-uncle is actor Joseph Callari.

Bleu appeared in television commercials starting at age two, for products such as Life cereal, Bounty, Hasbro and Nabisco. He began taking jazz and ballet classes, usually as the only boy in the class. By age four he was a model with the Ford Modeling Agency in New York. He appeared in print ads for stores such as Macy's, Gap, Target and Toys "R" Us and in fashion spreads in Child, Parents, and American Baby magazines, as well as having his image on toys and game packaging.

At age six, Bleu appeared in his first professional theater production, at The Town Hall. This three-concert series, created, written, and hosted by Scott Siegel, took place over one weekend and included a tribute to David Merrick. Bleu played an abandoned homeless mute in the play Tiny Tim is Dead.

Bleu graduated from Los Angeles County High School for the Arts. He trained in dancing at the Debbie Allen Dance Academy and attended the Fiorello H. LaGuardia High School of Music & Art and Performing Arts as a theater major, following in his mother's footsteps. Bleu graduated from high school in 2007 and was admitted to Stanford University, but declined to matriculate.

== Acting career ==
=== 1996–2005: Early career ===
Bleu moved with his family from New York to Los Angeles in 1996. He worked steadily in episodic television and feature film roles, including a recurring role on the short-lived ABC police drama High Incident and a guest star appearance on ER. He also appeared in some films, like Beach Movie (1998) (Note: Also known as Boardheads.) and the sci-fi thriller Soldier (1998). His feature films from this period include the Tim Allen comedy Galaxy Quest (1999), the comedy Mystery Men (1999), and the drama Family Tree (1999), Bleu also had roles in Malcolm & Eddie, as Matthew, and Cover Me: Based on the True Life of an FBI Family (Note: Also known as Cover Me.) (2000), as Nick Elderby, and smaller roles like in the comedy series Nickelodeon's show The Amanda Show.

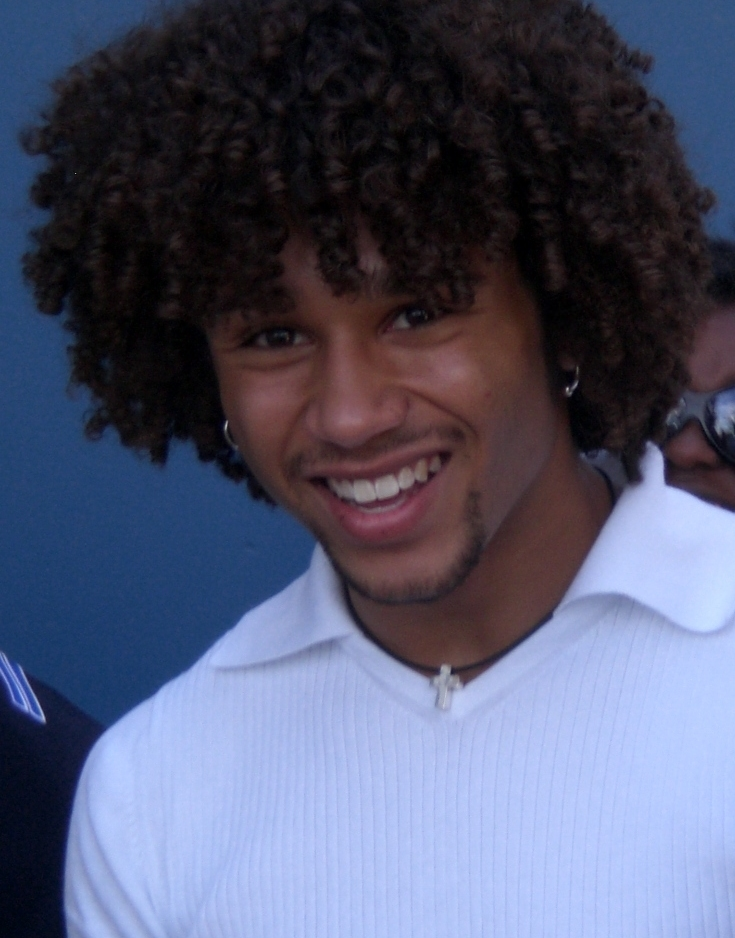
Bleu in January 2006

Additionally, Bleu was developing his dance skills and in 2001 began intensive training at the Debbie Allen Dance Academy. There he undertook a full gamut of dance instruction, including ballet, jazz, tap, modern, hip-hop, African, break dance, salsa, flamenco and ballroom. Debbie Allen, the choreographer who starred in the TV series Fame, told Dance Spirit magazine: "I think [Bleu] really has a career. Success is one thing, but a career is a much longer, broader journey".

Bleu attended the Los Angeles County High School for the Arts, a magnet school like the Fiorello H. LaGuardia High School of Music & Art and Performing Arts, which was portrayed in the movie and television series Fame and which Bleu's mother attended. During his freshman year, he won his first sizable film role in the teen action caper Catch That Kid (2004), (Note: Also known as Catch That Girl, and Catch That Kid!.) about a girl named Maddie Phillips and her friends Austin and Gus who decide to rob a bank after learning that money is needed to aid her ailing father Tom Phillips (Sam Robards), alongside Kristen Stewart and Max Thieriot. It was a box-office flop, grossing $10 million, but served as an important step for Bleu, who was still building his acting career. During high school, he performed in student productions of Footloose and Grease, winning the honor of Theatre Student of the Year.

In the summer of 2004 Bleu landed a starring role in the television series Flight 29 Down, alongside Allen Alvarado, Hallee Hirsh, Lauren Storm, Jeremy James Kissner, Johnny Pacar and Kristy Wu, which aired for three seasons on the Discovery Kids network. The program, a juvenile version of the ABC series Lost, concerned a group of teenagers stranded on a tropical island after their plane crashes. Bleu played Nathan McHugh, a Boy Scout whose leadership skills do not quite measure up to his self-confidence.

=== 2006–2008: High School Musical and breakthrough ===
Bleu's next television project was the Disney Channel original film High School Musical (2006), in which he portrayed the basketball player Chad Danforth, who tries to persuade his teammate Troy Bolton (Zac Efron) to give up his interest in theater and focus on winning a basketball championship. High School Musical premiered on January 20, 2006; with an audience of 7.7 million television viewers, it was the Disney Channel's most successful TV movie up to that point. The film, which also starred Ashley Tisdale, Lucas Grabeel, Vanessa Hudgens, and Monique Coleman, was a major success and helped Bleu gain recognition among teenage audiences. The film's soundtrack was certified quadruple platinum by the Recording Industry Association of America (RIAA).

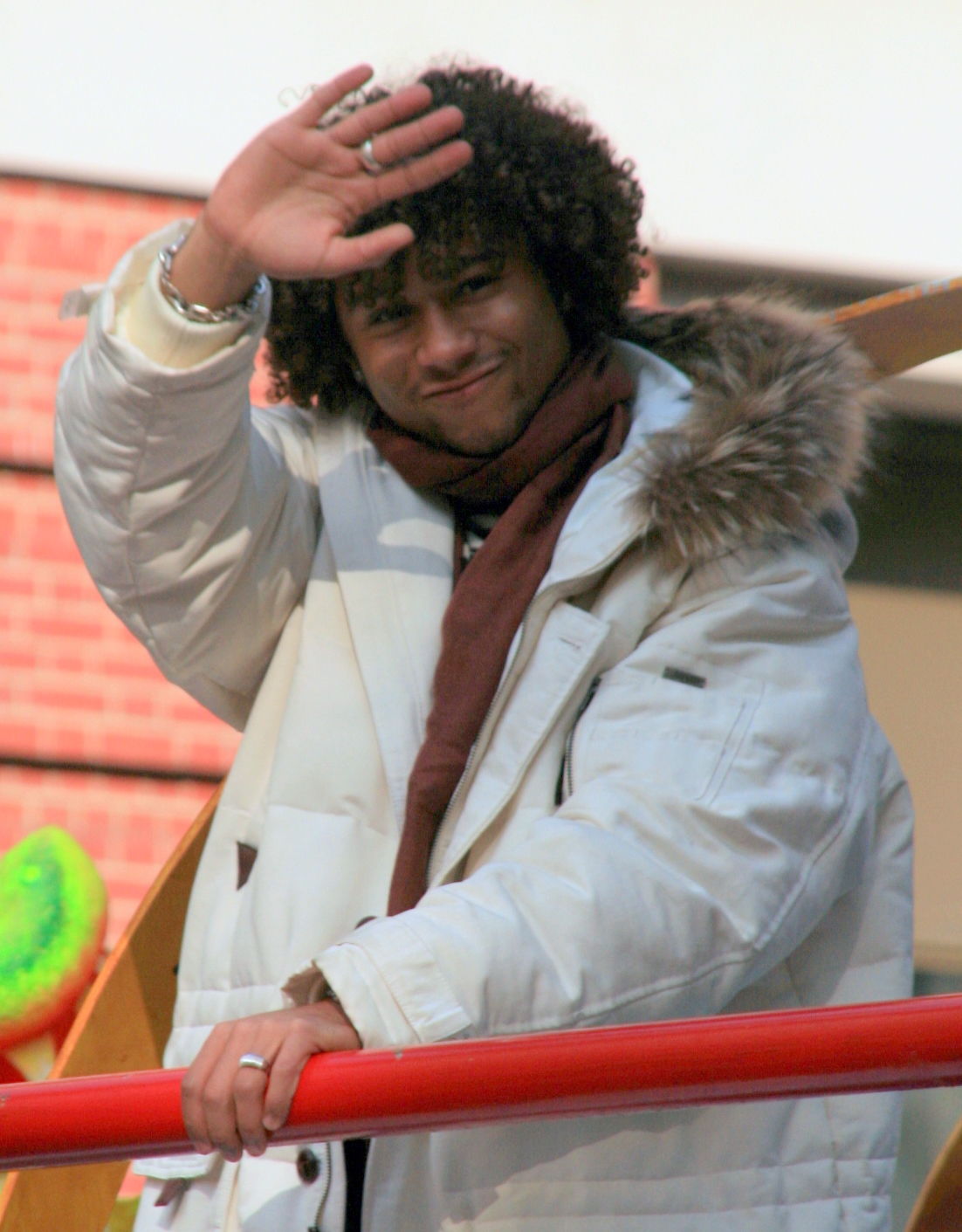
Bleu at the Macy's Thanksgiving Day Parade in 2007

He joined co-stars on the 51-date High School Musical: The Concert (2006–2007) tour to promote the film, work on the second film in the series began, and Bleu was confirmed to be returning for the sequel. High School Musical 2 (2007) was released on August 17, 2007. The premiere was seen by over 17.2 million viewers in the U.S., almost 10 million more than its predecessor, making it the highest-rated Disney Channel movie of all time. Disney Channel aired a weekly program called Road to High School Musical 2, beginning on June 8, 2007, and leading up to the premiere of High School Musical 2 in August. The show offered viewers a behind-the-scenes look into the movie's production. The world premiere of the opening number "What Time Is It" was on Radio Disney on May 25, 2007, and "I Don't Dance" premiered on August 14, 2007. The film was generally well received by critics, gaining a score of 77/100 at Metacritic and 82% on Rotten Tomatoes. It broke opening-weekend records and grossed over $250 million worldwide. Its soundtrack, featuring many contributions from Bleu, sold over three million copies in the U.S. alone. "I Don't Dance", a duet with Lucas Grabeel, became his first top-40 hit on the Billboard Hot 100, and was certified gold by the Recording Industry Association of America (RIAA). It was named the official theme song of the 2007 Little League World Series. During this time, Bleu began singing on soundtracks for the Disney Channel, and released a cover of "Two Worlds" (2007) to promote Tarzan.

In 2007, Bleu starred in his next film, the Disney Channel original Jump In!, (Note: Filming took place from June–July 2006 in Toronto, Ontario, Canada.) which aired on January 12, 2007. Directed by Paul Hoen, the movie revolves around a young boy, Izzy Daniels, who trains regularly to try to follow in his father's Kenneth Daniels (David Reivers)' footsteps and win the Golden Glove, an amateur boxing tournament. Bleu played Izzy and Keke Palmer portrayed Mary Thomas, his friend who has a crush on him. Again, Disney scored a crossover hit with the Jump In! soundtrack album, released in January 2007, on which Bleu sings the track "Push It to the Limit". Reaching the screens on the Disney Channel that January, Jump In! was a major hit among young viewers and quickly became the network's highest-rated premiere, breaking the record set by The Cheetah Girls 2 in 2006. Its soundtrack was also a commercial hit, achieving gold status from the RIAA three months after its release. Bleu appeared in the Atlanta group Small Change's music video "Don't Be Shy", featuring Chani and Lil' JJ.

He guest starred as Johnny Collins in the premiere two episodes of Disney's Hannah Montana (2006–2008). He also had a small role as Spencer on Ned's Declassified School Survival Guide, appearing in the episodes "Dismissal & School Plays" and "Revenge & School Records". He also appeared at the Mother Goose Parade as Grand Marshal in 2006 and 2007. While with Disney Channel, Bleu also participated in the first ever Disney Channel Games and co-captained the blue team along with Jake T. Austin, Maiara Walsh, Cole Sprouse and Kiely Williams. A year before, he returned to repeat his captaincy of the blue team with Brenda Song, Vanessa Hudgens, Monique Coleman and Jason Earles. In August 2007, Bleu starred in Flight 29 Down: The Hotel Tango, a teen drama film version of the television series of the same name. Also in 2007, he was the voice of the Magic Gourd in The Secret of the Magic Gourd (2007), He appeared on The Tyra Banks Show in 2008.

Bleu went on to reprise his role of Chad Danforth in High School Musical 3: Senior Year (2008), the first film in the High School Musical franchise to receive a theatrical release. It opened at number one at the North American box office in October 2008, earning $42 million in its first weekend, which broke the record previously held by Mamma Mia! for the biggest opening by a musical. The film finished with $252 million worldwide, which exceeded Disney's expectations. The song "The Boys Are Back" (2008), a duet with Zac Efron, became his second top forty hit on the Billboard Hot 100, and was certified gold by the Recording Industry Association of America (RIAA) and Australian Recording Industry Association (ARIA). For his role as Chad Danforth, the team captain of the school's basketball team, he was nominated for an NAACP Image Award, a Young Artist Award and Teen Choice Awards in 2007 and 2009 respectively. Bleu lent his voice for the role of Chad Danforth in various High School Musical video games.

=== 2009–present: Continued work ===
The following year, Bleu played the lead role in the film called Free Style (2009). It concerns Cale Bryant, an eighteen-year-old man who tries to find himself by winning the Amateur National Motocross Championships. Free Style performed poorly in the box office, having only grossed $720,000 from a $10 million budget. Over the next few years, Bleu's television roles included the drama series The CW Television Network's show The Beautiful Life: TBL. The series was subsequently cancelled on September 25, 2009, after televising 2 episodes. In December 2009, the technology company HP became the show's sponsor and began airing the show's five episodes on YouTube. Also in 2009, he was a voice actor in Beyond All Boundaries, and appeared on Entertainment Tonight and The Morning Show with Mike and Juliet. Also in 2009, he was the voice of Coltrane in the premiere two episodes of Disney's Phineas and Ferb.

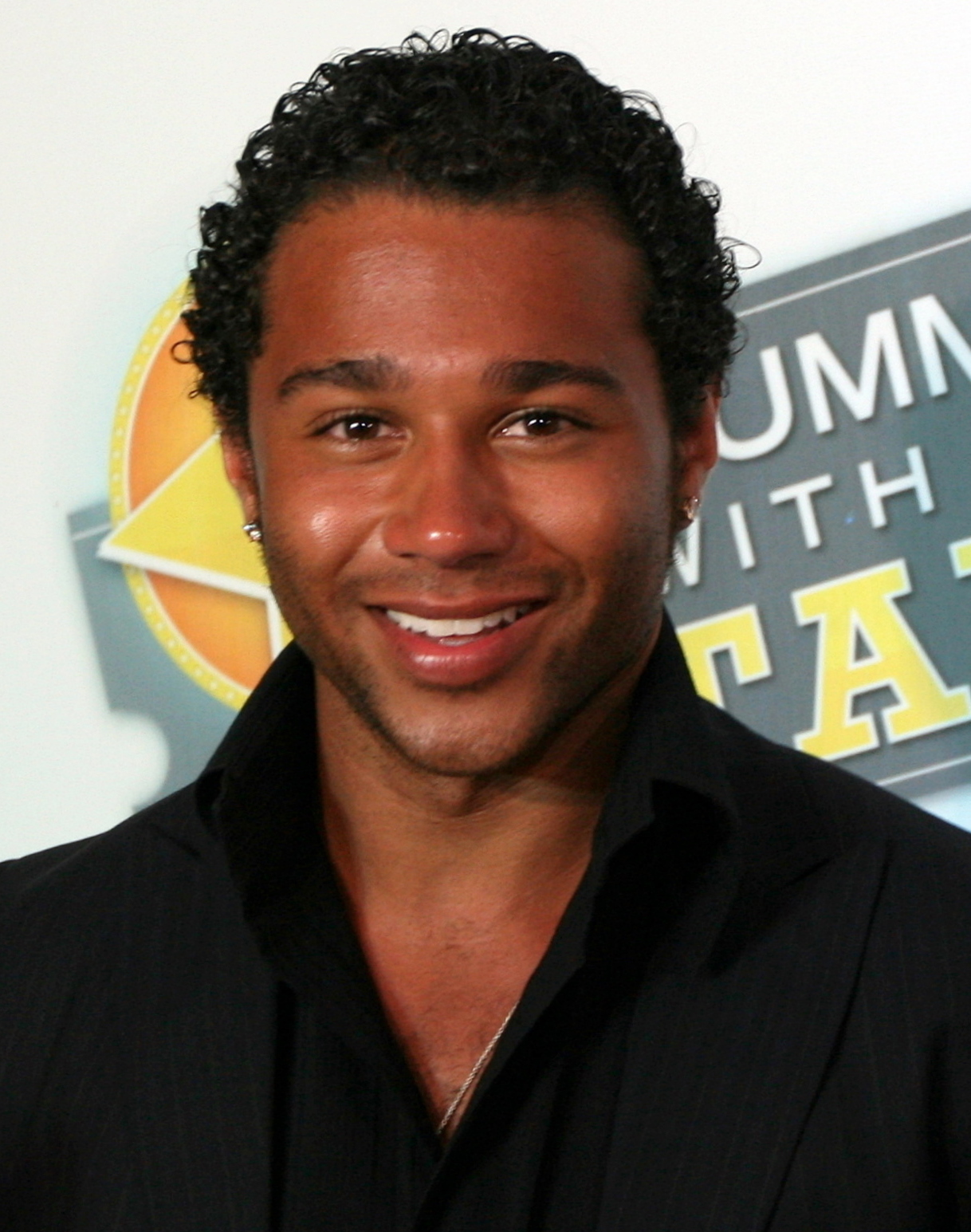
Bleu at the Summer with the Stars in 2011

Corbin Bleu made his Broadway stage debut in 2010 as the lead character, bodega-owner Usnavi de la Vega, in the critically acclaimed musical In the Heights. and guest starred in one episode of The Good Wife as DJ Javier Berlin in October 2010. in 2010, Corbin starred in the short comedy film I Owe My Life to Corbin Bleu, alongside Andrew Caldwell, Drake Bell, Sarah Hyland, Ryan Pinkston, Sterling Knight, Matt Prokop, Matt Shively and Josh Sussman. In 2011, he performed the voice of Lou in The Little Engine That Could (2011). From August 5–7, Bleu performed in the musical Hairspray as Seaweed J. Stubbs at the Hollywood Bowl, alongside Nick Jonas, Harvey Fierstein, Marissa Jaret Winokur, Drew Carey and Darlene Love. and he performed the voice of Flip in Tonka Chuck and Friends: Big Air Dare.

In 2012, Bleu also had a role in and co-produced the indie horror anthology Scary or Die (2012), a collection of five short horror films. In 2012, he joined the cast of Godspell as Jesus Christ beginning April 17 at the Circle in the Square Theatre. (Note: Corbin Bleu takes over the role from original star Hunter Parrish, who will play his final performance on April 15.) He joined co-stars on the 66th Annual Tony Awards, to performing "Day by Day" and "Light of the World" at Beacon Theatre, with Neil Patrick Harris as the host. During this time, he recorded the duet "If I Never Knew You" (2012), with Anna Maria Perez de Tagle to promote Pocahontas. He guest starred in one episode of Blue Bloods as Officer Blake in 2012. In 2012, he performed the voice of Drew in Twinkle Toes, Bleu starred in the drama film To Write Love on Her Arms (originally titled Renee (Note: Also known as Day One; formerly Renee.)) in 2012, with Kat Dennings, Chad Michael Murray and Rupert Friend. The film began production in Orlando, Florida, in February 2011.

In March 2013, Bleu had a role in the horror film The Monkey's Paw (2013). and guest starred in one episode of Franklin & Bash as Jordan Allen French in 2013. In April 2013, Bleu was cast in the role of Jeffrey King on the ABC daytime soap opera One Life to Live. In 2013, Bleu starred in the film Sugar (2013), alongside Shenae Grimes and Marshall Allman. about a runaway girl named Sugar living on the streets of Venice, Los Angeles. The film began production in Venice, Los Angeles, on November 30, 2010. Also in 2013, Bleu appeared in the horror films Nurse 3D (2013), alongside Paz de la Huerta and Katrina Bowden. The film began production in Toronto, on September 6, 2011, and wrapped on October 21, 2011. In 2014 he also appeared as a guest star in Psych, the USA Network television series in Season 8.

In September 2013, Bleu took part in the seventeenth-season of ABC's dancing competition Dancing with the Stars. He finished as runner-up.

Bleu's only release in 2015 was the moderately successful Megachurch Murder (2015), in which he played a Marcus King, with Tamala Jones, Shanica Knowles and Romeo Miller. In addition, Bleu appeared in Family Shots with The Human Race Theatre Company. In 2016, he also made a guest appearance in an episode of the family drama, The Fosters, playing the role of Mercutio, a character who appears in a school musical production of Romeo and Juliet. Bleu and fellow guest-star Ashley Argota also co-starred in a production of Romeo and Juliet: Love Is a Battlefield at Rockwell Table and Stage, produced by The Fosters co-creator Bradley Bredeweg. He also had a small role as Hunter on Castle in 2016.

In January 2016, he joined the cast of The Dodgers as Simon, the rational voice amid the habitually stoned chatter, and beginning January 21 at the Hudson Mainstage Theatre. In October 2016, he took part in Broadway productions notably the leading role in Holiday Inn, The New Irving Berlin Musical (originally titled Holiday Inn), a musical based on the 1942 Academy Award-winning film of the same name. Returning to his tap dancing roots was "like riding a bike". His former Disney co-stars attended a performance in October 2016. Bleu began vlogging during his tenure in Holiday Inn, resulting in Bleu Skies: Backstage at Holiday Inn with Corbin Bleu. Bleu, who played Ted Hanover in the new Irving Berlin musical, gave a glimpse of backstage life at Studio 54, where he and his co-stars (including former vlogger Bryce Pinkham, Lora Lee Gayer, Megan Lawrence and Megan Sikora) celebrated an entire year's worth of special occasions eight times a week. Bleu Skies launched off on August 23 and ran every Tuesday for eight weeks. with Bleu being nominated for a Chita Rivera Awards for Dance and Choreography in 2017, for outstanding dancing in a Broadway show and eventually winning a Chita Rivera Award for his performance.

While with ABC television, Bleu also participated in the revival of Battle of the Network Stars, joining the red team along with Joey Lawrence, Nolan Gould, Lisa Whelchel and Kim Fields, with Ronda Rousey as the captain. The series premiered on June 29, 2017. From July 28–30, Bleu performed in the musical Mamma Mia! as Sky at the Hollywood Bowl, alongside Dove Cameron, Lea DeLaria and Jennifer Nettles. The theatre premiered on July 28, 2017. Corbin Bleu's career also included voice over work with Breathe Bible. In December 2017, Corbin Bleu hosted the 2017 Looking Ahead Awards, presented by The Actors Fund.

In November 2017, Bleu returned to 25th season of Dancing with the Stars and in Week 8, he performed in a trio salsa with Jordan Fisher and his professional partner Lindsay Arnold. After the trio delivered their salsa to audiences, they ended with a score of 30 from the judges,

In January 2018, he guest starred in one episode of The Middle as Luke, a handsome drummer that catches Brad Bottig (Brock Ciarlelli)'s attention. In 2018 he also appeared as a guest star in Chicago Med, the NBC television series in season 3, as Tommy Oliver. From June 27 – July 3, Bleu performed in the musical Singin' in the Rain as Don Lockwood at the St. Louis Municipal Opera Theatre, (Note: Also known as The Muny.) a musical based on the 1952 BAFTA Film Award-winning film of the same name. The theatre premiered on June 27, 2018. with Bleu being nominated for a St. Louis Theater Circle Awards in 2019, for Outstanding Actor in a Musical. Near the end of 2018, Bleu played Billy Crocker in Anything Goes, which was performed in-the-round at Arena Stage in D.C. Washington from November 2, 2018, to December 23, 2018. with Bleu being winnin a Helen Hayes Award in 2019, for Outstanding Lead Actor in a Musical.

In March 2019, he was cast in the Netflix drama film Walk. Ride. Rodeo. (2019), (Note: The film about the life of a championship barrel racer Amberley Snyder.) alongside Missi Pyle, Spencer Locke and Bailey Chase, directed by Conor Allyn. He appeared on Show Offs in 2019. In 2019, Bleu played Bill Calhoun/Lucentio in the Broadway revival of Kiss Me, Kate at the Roundabout Theatre's Studio 54. The musical originally opened on Broadway in 1948 and five years later was the basis for a liberally adapted 1953 film of the same name. The production, directed by Scott Ellis, began previewing on February 14, 2019. The limited engagement played until June 30 at Studio 54. For his performance, Bleu was nominated for the Drama Desk Award for Outstanding Featured Actor in a Musical. Bleu was also nominated for a 2019 Chita Rivera Awards for Dance and Choreography, for Outstanding Male Dancer in a Broadway Show and for an Audience Choice Awards for Favorite Featured Actor in a Musical. He was cast in a co-starring role in the Jordan Barker film Witches in the Woods (2019), (Note: Also known as Stranded.) (Note: Filming took place from March 2018 in Sudbury, Ontario, Canada.) The project also stars Hannah Kasulka and Sasha Clements. Bleu filmed an independent movie titled Ovid and the Art of Love. Filmed partially at the old St. Agnus Church in Michigan, the project also stars John Savage, Tamara Feldman and Tara Summers.

In 2020, he appeared on The Disney Family Singalong, which aired on ABC on April 16, 2020, during the COVID-19 pandemic in the United States. In May 2020, he also appeared as a guest star in Supergirl, the CW television series in season 5, as Trevor Crane. On June 30, 2020, Bleu joined in a live reading adaptation of Jason Reitman's Up in the Air to help raise funds for Acting for a Cause. The event's purpose was to help industry personnel impacted by COVID-19. Bleu was later announced as the host of the 2021 Jimmy Awards, (Note: Also known as The National High School Musical Theatre Awards.) in honor of legendary Broadway producer and theater owner James M. Nederlander.

In 2021, he guest starred as Blaine in the premiere two episodes on The CW Television Network soap opera Dynasty. (Note: Based on the 1980s series of the same name.) In July 2021, he was cast in the Hallmark Channel original entitled Love, for Real (2021), alongside Chloe Bridges, Camille Kostek and Scott Michael Foster, directed by Maclain Nelson. In December 2021, he appeared as the male lead in the a Lifetime Christmas movie, titled A Christmas Dance Reunion (2021), alongside Monique Coleman, (Note: Corbin Bleu and Monique Coleman are back together again after thirteen years.) directed by Brian Herzlinger. During this time, Bleu performed songs for the soundtrack of Winnie the Pooh: The New Musical Adaptation, and released a cover of "Winnie the Pooh" (2021).

In July 2022, he was cast in the Hallmark Channel original entitled Campfire Christmas (2022), alongside Tori Anderson and Jeffrey Bowyer-Chapman, directed by David I. Strasser. He returned to the High School Musical franchise, guest starring as himself in the third and fourth seasons of High School Musical: The Musical: The Series, Bleu contributes to two numbers a duet with star Sofia Wylie on the original song "Different Way to Dance" and with the entire cast on "Everyday". From July 5–13, Bleu performed in the musical Mary Poppins as Bert at the St. Louis Municipal Opera Theatre, directed by John Tartaglia, choreographed by Patrick O'Neill, with music direction by Brad Haak. In September 2022, he starred as Cab Calloway, in the drama film Remember Me: The Mahalia Jackson Story, alongside Keith David, Vanessa Williams and Columbus Short, directed by Denise Dowse.

In 2023, he was cast in the comedy film Camp Hideout (2023), with Christopher Lloyd, and directed by Sean Olson. Starting in the summer of 2023, he starred in the world premiere of the musical Summer Stock at the Goodspeed Opera House. On September 26, 2023, Bleu performed in the horror comedy rock musical Little Shop of Horrors as Seymour Krelborn, replacing Jeremy Jordan at the Westside Theatre, directed by Tony Award winner Michael Mayer, choreographed by Ellenore Scott, with music direction by Will Van Dyke. In April 2024, he returned to the show as Seymour replacing Darren Criss with Jinkx Monsoon as Audrey Fulquard. In April 2025, he starred in The Great Gatsby as Nick Carraway at the London Coliseum for its London and West End premiere. with Bleu being nominated a Laurence Olivier Awards in 2026, for Best Actor in a Supporting Role in a Musical.

== Music career ==
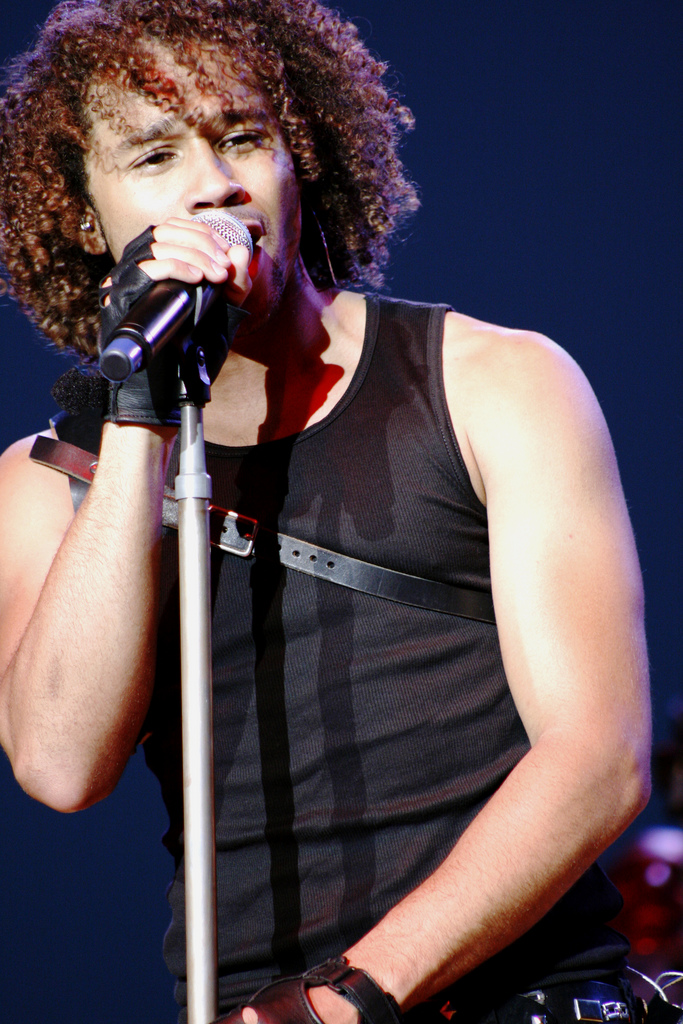
Bleu in August 2008

Bleu's first professionally recorded song was titled "Circles" or "Circles in My Mind" for his then TV show, Flight 29 Down. Bleu signed a contract with Hollywood Records, a Disney-owned label. (Note: His first single off the album, "Push It to the Limit", was recorded and appears on the soundtrack of Jump In!.) His debut album Another Side, was released in May 2007. The album debuted at No. 36 on the Billboard 200 album charts, selling 18,000 in its first week. Bleu, who admires Prince, Michael Jackson, and Justin Timberlake, cowrote five songs on the album. One of those tracks was titled "Shake It Off", an ode to the musician Prince. In 2007 he toured in support of Another Side with the teen sister duo Aly & AJ.

Bleu worked with Ne-Yo on "I Get Lonely", and with other performers such as Matthew Gerrard and Eric Hudson. A music video for his first single, "Push It to the Limit" premiered on the Disney Channel, and was used to promote the movie Jump In! "Push It to the Limit" reached the Top 20 on the Billboard Hot 100, and his second single, "Deal With It", (Note: "Deal With It" did not enter the Billboard Hot 100, but peaked at number one hundred twelve on the Bubbling Under Hot 100 Singles chart.) was originally written and sung by Jay Sean. He later gave it to Bleu, whose version of the song features background vocals by Sean. The song went on to earn Sean a BMI Songwriter Award. Bleu sang the duet "Still There for Me" with Vanessa Hudgens for his debut album Another Side.

Bleu toured with fellow High School Musical cast members from late November 2006 to late January 2007 in High School Musical: The Concert, and with Drake Bell and Aly & AJ performing in about 40 different cities. To promote his debut album, Bleu performed at the Nextfest Summer Tour with Aly & AJ and Drake Bell and special guest Bianca Ryan.

His debut single "Run It Back Again" was featured in the movie Minutemen, on January 22, 2008. The song is also featured on Radio Disney Jams, Vol. 10. Bleu performed at the Crawford County Fair Grandstand with Vanessa Hudgens, on August 18, 2008. A week later, on August 25, Bleu performed at the Michigan State Fair with Raven-Symoné. His second album Speed of Light was released on March 10, 2009, via Hollywood Records. The album's first single, "Moments That Matter", was performed by Bleu at Kids' Inaugural: "We Are the Future".

In 2017, Bleu signed a one-album recording contract with Ghostlight Records to distribute his Holiday Inn, The New Irving Berlin Musical soundtrack music, was released digitally on June 2, 2017. The album featured twenty-one songs, and was produced by Kurt Deutsch with Todd Whitelock serving as coproducer and Universal Stage Productions as executive producer. Bleu later signed a two-album recording contract with Ghostlight Records to distribute his Kiss Me, Kate soundtrack music, the 24th cast album recording for Roundabout Theatre Company, since launching the musical theatre program with She Loves Me in 1993.

In an interview with Paul Wontorek, Bleu said he is naturally a lyric baritone. He added that he is a fan of Brian d'Arcy James and gets vocal influences from him.

== Personal life ==
Bleu has been a supporter of Do Something. On March 16, 2010, he was added to the "Broadway Wall of Fame". His portrait was unveiled at Tony's Di Napoli Restaurant in New York City. In 2011, Bleu began dating actress Sasha Clements. On October 15, 2014, they became engaged, and they married on July 23, 2016.

== Public image ==
In 2013, an MIT study discovered that Bleu was the third most-common biography article subject among all the different language versions of Wikipedia; pages on him were available in 194 languages, placing below only Jesus (214) and Barack Obama (200), and above Confucius (192) and Isaac Newton (191). The contradiction between Bleu's high notability on Wikipedia and low real-life notability comparative to the aforementioned historical figures made the creation of these pages unusual.

== Philanthropy ==
Bleu has supported various charitable organizations and causes during his career. In 2011, Bleu worked for charities such as Starlight Children's Foundation, the Make-A-Wish Foundation, and St. Jude Children's Research Hospital. In May 2011, he attended the Do Something Awards kickoff event.

== Filmography ==
=== Films ===
Year	Title	Role	Director(s)	Notes	Ref.
1998	Soldier	Johnny	Paul W. S. Anderson		
1998	Beach Movie	Kid	John Quinn		
1999	Family Tree	Ricky	Duane Clark		
1999	Mystery Men	Butch	Kinka Usher		
1999	Galaxy Quest	Young Tommy Webber	Dean Parisot		
2004	Catch That Kid	Austin	Bart Freundlich		(Note: It is a remake of the Danish blockbuster, Klatretøsen 2002.)
2007	The Secret of the Magic Gourd	Magic Gourd (voice)	John Chu; Frankie Chung	English dub	
2008	High School Musical 3: Senior Year	Chad Danforth	Kenny Ortega		
2009	Free Style	Cale Bryant	William Dear	Also producer	(Note: The film premiered on December 24, 2008 in Mexico, and released in United States on October 9, 2009. and was eventually released Direct-to-DVD on March 10, 2010.)
2009	Beyond All Boundaries	Eddie W. Robinson (voice); Sgt. Dan Levin (voice)	David Briggs		
2010	I Owe My Life to Corbin Bleu	Himself	Deb Hagan	Short film	
2011	The Little Engine That Could	Lou (voice)	Elliot M. Bour		
2011	Tonka Chuck and Friends: Big Air Dare	Flip (voice)	Fab Filippo		
2012	Twinkle Toes	Drew (voice)	Mauro Casalese; Dave Woodgate		
2012	Scary or Die	Emmett	Bob Badway; Michael Emanuel; Igor Meglic	Also producer	
2013	Nurse 3D	Steve	Doug Aarniokoski		(Note: The film premiered on September to October 2011 in Toronto, and released in Switzerland on September 28, 2013. and was eventually released Direct-to-DVD on February 7, 2014.)
2013	Sugar	Sketch	Rotimi Rainwater		(Note: The film premiered on November 30, 2010 in Venice, Los Angeles, and was released theatrically on September 6, 2013.)
2013	The Monkey's Paw	Catfish	Brett Simmons		
2015	To Write Love on Her Arms	Mackey	Nathan Frankowski		(Note: The film premiered on March 11, 2012 at the Omaha Film Festival, and was eventually released Direct-to-DVD on March 3, 2015.)
2015	Megachurch Murder	Marcus King	Darin Scott		
2019	Walk. Ride. Rodeo.	Diego	Conor Allyn		(Note: Principal photography began in New Mexico in July 2018.)
2019	Witches in the Woods	Philip	Jordan Barker		
2019	Ovid and the Art of Love	Ovid	Esmé von Hoffman		(Note: Filming took place from October 2015.)
2021	Love, for Real	Marco	Maclain Nelson		(Note: Filming took place from 2021 in Hawaii.)
2022	Remember Me: The Mahalia Jackson Story	Cab Calloway	Denise Dowse		(Note: The film about the life of American gospel singer, Mahalia Jackson.)
2023	Camp Hideout	Jake	Sean Olson		(Note: Filming took place from 2022 in Franklin, Tennessee.)

=== Television films ===
Year	Title	Role	Director(s)	Notes	Ref.
2006	High School Musical	Chad Danforth	Kenny Ortega		
2007	Jump In!	Isadore "Izzy" Daniels	Paul Hoen		
2007	High School Musical 2	Chad Danforth	Kenny Ortega		
2007	Flight 29 Down: The Hotel Tango	Nathan McHugh	D.J. MacHale		
2021	A Christmas Dance Reunion	Barrett Brewster	Brian Herzlinger		
2022	Campfire Christmas	Thomas	David I. Strasser		

=== Television series ===
Year	Title	Role	Notes
1996	High Incident	N/A	Recurring role
1996	ER	Little Boy	Episode: "Ask Me No Questions, I'll Tell You No Lies"
1998	Malcolm & Eddie	Matthew	Episode: "Menace II Theology"
2000	Cover Me: Based on the True Life of an FBI Family	Nick Elderby	Episode: "Our Mr. Brooks"
2001–2002	The Amanda Show	Russel Carter	2 episodes
2005–2007	Flight 29 Down	Nathan McHugh	Main cast (26 episodes)
2006–2007	Ned's Declassified School Survival Guide	Spencer	2 episodes
2006–2008	Hannah Montana	Johnny Collins	2 episodes
2007	Mother Goose Parade	Himself/Grand Marshal	TV special
2009	Phineas and Ferb	Coltrane (voice)	2 episodes
2009	The Beautiful Life: TBL	Isaac Taylor	Main cast (5 episodes)
2010	The Good Wife	Jay Hawke/DJ Javier Berlin	Episode: "Cleaning House"
2012	Blue Bloods	Officer Blake	Episode: "Family Business"
2013	Franklin & Bash	Jordan Allen French	Episode: "Dead and Alive"
2013	One Life to Live	Jeffrey King	Main role (40 episodes)
2013–2017	Dancing with the Stars	Himself	Runner-Up (season 17); Participant in a trio salsa in (season 25)
2014	Psych	Luther	Episode: "Shawn and Gus Truck Things Up"
2014	Drop Dead Diva	Michael Donaldson	Episode: "Soulmates?"
2015	Fake Off	Host	TV special
2016	Say Yes to the Dress	Himself	Episode: "The Sasha Dress!"
2016	Castle	Hunter	Episode: "Tone Death"
2016	The Fosters	Mercutio	Episode: "The Show"
2017	Battle of the Network Stars	Himself	Episode: "TV Sitcoms vs. TV Kids"
2018	The Middle	Luke	Episode: "The Other Man"
2018	Chicago Med	Tommy Oliver	Episode: "Lemons and Lemonade"
2019	Show Offs	Himself	Episode: "Doctor Space"
2020	The Disney Family Singalong	Himself	TV special
2020	Supergirl	Trevor Crane	Episode: "Reality Bytes"
2020	Acting for a Cause	Craig Gregory	Episode: "Up in the Air"
2021	Jimmy Awards	Host	TV special
2021	Dynasty	Blaine	2 episodes
2022	The Real Dirty Dancing	Himself	Winner
2022	Hell's Kitchen	Himself	Episode: "Slipping Down to Hell"
2022–2023	High School Musical: The Musical: The Series	Himself	5 episodes
2025	Celebrity Jeopardy	Himself	Season 3, Episode 5

=== Theater ===
Year	Title	Role	Venue	Notes	Ref.
2010	In the Heights	Usnavi de la Vega	Richard Rodgers Theatre	Broadway	
2011	Hairspray	Seaweed J. Stubbs	Hollywood Bowl		
2012	Godspell	Jesus Christ	Circle in the Square Theatre	Broadway	
2015	Family Shots	Aaron	The Human Race Theatre	Regional	
2015	Romeo and Juliet: Love Is a Battlefield	Romeo Montague	Rockwell Table and Stage	Regional	
2016	The Dodgers	Simon	Hudson Mainstage Theatre	Regional	
2016	Holiday Inn, The New Irving Berlin Musical	Ted Hanover	Roundabout Theatre Company	Broadway	(Note: Based on the 1942 Fred Astaire, film of the same name.)
2017	Mamma Mia!	Sky	Hollywood Bowl		
2018	Singin' in the Rain	Don Lockwood	St. Louis Municipal Opera Theatre	Regional	(Note: Based on the 1952 Gene Kelly, film of the same name.)
2018	Anything Goes	Billy Crocker	Arena Stage	Regional	
2019	Kiss Me, Kate	Bill Calhoun / Lucentio	Studio 54	Broadway	(Note: Based on the 1953 Cole Porter and Bella and Samuel Spewack, film of the same name.)
2022	Catch Me If You Can	Frank Abagnale Jr.	Arena Stage	Regional	(Note: Based on the 2002 Steven Spielberg, film of the same name.)
2022	Mary Poppins	Bert	St. Louis Municipal Opera Theatre	Regional	(Note: Based on the 1964 Robert Stevenson, film of the same name and book series by P. L. Travers.)
2023	Summer Stock	Joe Ross	Goodspeed Opera House	Regional	
2023-2024	Little Shop of Horrors	Seymour Krelborn	Westside Theatre	Off-Broadway	(Note: The musical is loosely based on the low-budget 1960 black comedy film The Little Shop of Horrors.)
2024	Gutenberg! The Musical!	The Producer (One night cameo)	James Earl Jones Theatre	Broadway	
2024	Little Shop of Horrors	Seymour Krelborn	Westside Theatre	Off-Broadway	(Note: The musical is loosely based on the low-budget 1960 black comedy film The Little Shop of Horrors.)
2025	The Great Gatsby	Nick Carraway	London Coliseum	West End	
2026	The Great Gatsby	Nick Carraway	Broadway Theatre	Broadway	

=== Video games ===
Year	Title	Voice role	Notes	Ref.
2007	High School Musical: Makin' the Cut!	Chad Danforth	Based on the film	
2007	High School Musical: Sing It!	Chad Danforth	Based on the film	
2008	High School Musical 2: Work This Out!	Chad Danforth	Based on the film	
2008	High School Musical 3: Senior Year Dance	Chad Danforth	Based on the film	
2008	High School Musical 3: Senior Year DS	Chad Danforth	Based on the film	
2008	Disney Sing It! – High School Musical 3: Senior Year	Chad Danforth	Based on the film	

=== Music videos ===
Year	Title	Performer(s)	Album	Ref.
2001	"Sweet Baby"	Macy Gray (featuring Erykah Badu)	The Id	
2008	"Don't Be Shy"	Small Change (featuring Chani & Lil' JJ)	Concrete & Clay	

== Discography ==
=== Studio albums ===
- Another Side (2007)
- Speed of Light (2009)

=== Soundtrack albums ===
- High School Musical (2006)
- Jump In! (2007)
- High School Musical 2 (2007)
- High School Musical 3: Senior Year (2008)
- Holiday Inn, The New Irving Berlin Musical (2017)
- Kiss Me, Kate (2019)

== Concert tours ==
Headlining

- High School Musical: The Concert (2006)

Opening act

- Nextfest Summer Tour (Co-headlining with Aly & AJ, Drake Bell and Bianca Ryan) (2007)
- Crawford County Fair Grandstand (Co-headlining with Vanessa Hudgens) (2008)
- Michigan State Fair (Co-headlining with Raven-Symoné) (2008)
- Kids' Inaugural: "We Are the Future" (Co-headlining with Miley Cyrus, Demi Lovato and Jonas Brothers) (2009)
- Disney Channel Summer At Sea (Co-headlining with Jonnie and Brookie) (2009)

== Awards and nominations ==
Year of ceremony	Award	Category	Nominee/work	Result	Ref.
2001	LA High School for the Arts	Theatre Student of the Year	—N/a	Won	
2007	NAACP Image Awards	Outstanding Performance in a Youth/Children's Program	High School Musical	Nominated	
2007	Young Artist Award	Best Performance in a TV Movie, Miniseries or Special (Comedy or Drama) – Supporting Young Actor	High School Musical	Nominated	
2009	Teen Choice Awards	Choice Movie Actor: Music/Dance	High School Musical 3: Senior Year	Nominated	
2017	Chita Rivera Awards for Dance and Choreography	Outstanding Male Dancer in a Broadway Show	Holiday Inn, The New Irving Berlin Musical	Nominated	
2017	Chita Rivera Awards for Dance and Choreography	Best Male Performance	Holiday Inn, The New Irving Berlin Musical	Won	
2019	St. Louis Theater Circle Awards	Outstanding Actor in a Musical	Singin' in the Rain	Nominated	
2019	Helen Hayes Award	Outstanding Actor in a Musical	Anything Goes	Nominated	
2019	Helen Hayes Award	Outstanding Lead Actor in a Musical	Anything Goes	Won	
2019	Drama Desk Award	Outstanding Featured Actor in a Musical	Kiss Me, Kate	Nominated	
2019	Chita Rivera Awards for Dance and Choreography	Outstanding Male Dancer in a Broadway Show	Kiss Me, Kate	Nominated	
2019	Audience Choice Awards	Favorite Featured Actor in a Musical	Kiss Me, Kate	Nominated	
2026	Laurence Olivier Awards	Best Actor in a Supporting Role in a Musical	The Great Gatsby	Nominated	

== See also ==
- List of characters from High School Musical
- List of Italian-American actors
- List of Italian-American entertainers
- List of Jamaican Americans

== Notes ==
Awards and achievements
Preceded by Zendaya & Valentin Chmerkovskiy	Dancing with the Stars (US) runner up Season 17 (Fall 2013 with Karina Smirnoff)	Succeeded by Amy Purdy & Derek Hough
