= Corbin Bleu discography =

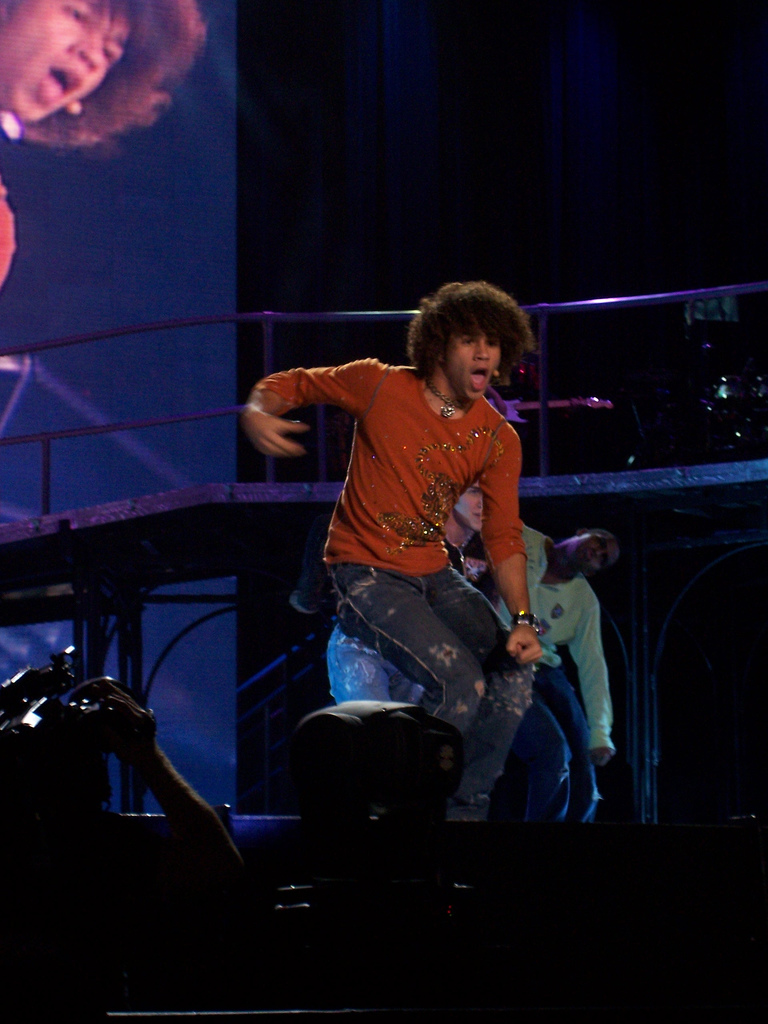
- Corbin Bleu, 2007
- Studio albums: 2
- Singles: 5
- Music videos: 5

The discography of Corbin Bleu consists of two studio albums, five singles, five music videos. Bleu has also recorded eleven singles and several other releases as his High School Musical character Chad Danforth in the High School Musical film series' soundtracks. He also pursued a solo career and released his debut album Another Side on May 1, 2007. The album debuted at number thirty-six on the U.S. Billboard 200, selling 18,000 copies in its first week. Bleu released his second album, Speed of Light, on March 10, 2009 in the U.S.

== Studio albums ==
Year	Album details	Peak chart positions	
Year	Album details	US	UK
2007	Another Side: Release date: May 1, 2007; Label: Hollywood Records	36	120
2009	Speed of Light: Release date: March 10, 2009; Label: Hollywood Records	—	—
"—" denotes releases that did not chart

== Singles ==
Year	Song	U.S. Hot	U.S. Pop	Certifications	Album
2006	"Push It to the Limit"	14	17	RIAA: Gold	Another Side
2007	"What Time Is It?" (with High School Musical 2 cast)	84	50		High School Musical 2
2007	"I Don't Dance" (with Lucas Grabeel)	70	50		High School Musical 2
2007	"Deal with It"	112	87		Another Side
2008	"Run It Back Again"	98	50		Radio Disney Jams, Vol. 10
2009	"Moments That Matter"	—	98		Speed of Light
2009	"Celebrate You"	110	87		Speed of Light

=== Other songs ===
Year	Song	U.S. Hot	U.S. Pop	Album
2008	"The Boys Are Back" (with Zac Efron)	101	50	High School Musical 3: Senior Year
2009	"If We Were a Movie" (with Miley Cyrus)	-	-	Hannah Montana 3

== Other appearances ==
Year	Song	U.S. Hot	U.S. Pop	Album
2007	"Two Worlds"	122	50	Disneymania 5
2007	"This Christmastime"	104	50	Disney Channel Holiday
2009	"Run It Back Again"	124	50	Disney Channel Playlist

== Music videos ==
Year	Title	Director
2006	"Push It to the Limit"	Diane Martel
2007	"Deal with It"	
2008	"Celebrate You"	Nevil Robbie
2009	"Run It Back Again"	
2009	"Moments That Matter"	Hudson Eric
