= Michael Emanuel =

Michael Emanuel may refer to:

- Michale Graves (born 1975), American singer-songwriter born Michael Emanuel
- Michael Emanuel (director), director of horror films including Scary or Die
