= A Dog of Flanders (1999 film) =

- Theatrical release poster
- Directed by: Kevin Brodie
- Screenplay by: Kevin Brodie; Robert Singer
- Based on: A Dog of Flanders; 1872 novel by Ouida
- Produced by: Frank Yablans
- Starring: Jack Warden; Jeremy James Kissner; Jesse James; Jon Voight; Cheryl Ladd; Steven Hartley; Bruce McGill
- Cinematography: Walther Vanden Ende
- Edited by: Annamaria Szanto
- Music by: Richard Friedman
- Production company: Woodbridge Films
- Distributed by: Warner Bros.
- Release date: 27 August 1999 (USA)
- Running time: 113 minutes
- Country: United States
- Language: English
- Budget: $7 million
- Box office: $2.2 million

A Dog of Flanders is a 1999 American drama film directed by Kevin Brodie and starring Jack Warden, Jeremy James Kissner, Jesse James, Jon Voight, Cheryl Ladd, Steven Hartley, and Bruce McGill. The screenplay was written by Brodie and Robert Singer, based on the 1872 novel of the same name by Ouida. The film was shot on location in Belgium, but ironically not in Antwerp, where the story takes place. It was the fifth film based on the original novel.

== Plot ==
Impoverished and alone, fine artist Mary Daas braves a blizzard with her toddler son, Nello, to reach the remote forest home of her father Jehaan Daas. The journey has brought Mary close to death. Mary asks Jehaan to promise to care for Nello after she is gone. Jehaan keeps the promise, helping his grandson to become an intelligent and sensitive young man.

As the two live a very poor existence, Nello and Jehaan make ends meet delivering milk to the nearby city of Antwerp, where they are welcomed and respected by the community. One afternoon on their way home, they encounter a Bouvier des Flandres dog beaten and left for dead in the woods. Taking him home, Jehaan and Nello nurse the dog back to health, with Nello naming him Patrasche; the boy and his new friend are inseparable thereon. With Jehaan's guidance, Nello hones his skill as an artist with Patrasche as his subject; his artwork comes to closely resemble that of his mother.

Nello soon introduces Patrasche to his lifelong companion and artistic muse Aloise, daughter of the local mill owner Nicholas Cogez. Meanwhile, Nello and Jehaan struggle to appease their wicked, heartless landlord Stephens. Nello gains a mentor when he meets artist Michel La Grande by the statue of Peter Paul Rubens outside the Cathedral of Our Lady. After defending the boy against Patrasche's vagrant first owner, Michel brings him into his study and begins his tutelage, though he leaves for business in Rome soon afterward.

As the years pass, Nello stays close with Aloise. Nicholas, disapproving of the match, forbids Nello from ever seeing Aloise again, despite protestation from his wife Anna. Nello finds some comfort in Michel, who has returned from Rome to help his pupil continue his education. Despite his plight, Nello sets his hopes on winning a famous art contest to gain respect from the art world. Aloise wholly supports her friend in this endeavor, as does the gregarious local blacksmith William.

Not long thereafter, Stephens accidentally burns down Nicholas' mill; visiting with the Cogez's servant Millie, he had been smoking a pipe in the nearby shed and fell asleep. The next morning as the town inspects the damage, it is discovered that Nello had secretly visited Aloise the night before, to give her a birthday gift. Stephens uses this as evidence of Nello's guilt of committing an act of revenge. Furious, Nicholas believes the lie and smashes Aloise's gift and blames Nello for starting the fire while Jehaan comes to Nello's defense. Thereafter, Stephens takes advantage of the town's new distrust of the boy by taking over his milk delivery route. After Jehaan suddenly dies, Nello and Patrasche are evicted from their home by Stephens. Though William (who still trusts the boy) offers the two a place to stay, Nello insists that he has work to do.

On Christmas Day, Nello eagerly awaits the results of the art contest to be announced by Michel, but he loses to Robert Kessler, son of the Mayor of Antwerp. Nello and Patrasche then find themselves back in the cold in the midst of a blizzard, just like Mary once was. As they wander along a dirt path, Patrasche sniffs out Nicholas' wallet buried in the snow; it contains a vast sum of money. Nello returns the wallet to the Cogez Mill and departs before Anna can offer him a meal, leaving Patrasche behind so that he might have a comfortable future. Nicholas then returns to the mill, distraught that he has lost his family's life savings. He becomes enraged upon seeing Patrasche until Anna explains what happened. At dinner, the family is quietly pensive until Millie reveals the truth of what happened to the mill. Horrified, Nicholas bands together his family and neighbors to find Nello. Patrasche runs ahead of the group and disappears into the storm.

Meanwhile, Nello returns to Antwerp and seeks shelter in the Cathedral just as Patrasche approaches. The two lie down to rest in front of the Rubens painting The Descent from the Cross. Nello dreams of him and Patrasche dying and being brought to the next life by Rubens himself where they rejoin Jehaan and finally meet Mary. Witnessing his own funeral, Nello is torn between staying with his family and returning to life. Mary insists that it is not yet time for him to pass on and that she will always love and be with him.

Awakening, Nello is greeted by the search party; Aloise had realized that Nello would have gone to the cathedral to see the Rubens. Nicholas falls to his knees and begs the boy's forgiveness for the accusations made against him. Michel then enters, having seen the villagers running for the cathedral, and presents Nello with the medal he won in a previous edition of the art contest. Nello then remarks how (as his dream reveals) Michel knew his mother, to whom Michel referred as his "gifted student". Michel is shocked, at which Anna explains that Mary never told anyone that Michel was Nello's father, for fear of a scandal. Michel and Nello embrace as Michel thanks God for finally bringing father and son together. Outside the cathedral, a star shines brightly.

== Cast ==
- Jack Warden as Jehan Daas
- Jeremy James Kissner as Nello
- Jesse James as Young Nello
- Jon Voight as Michel La Grande
- Cheryl Ladd as Anna Cogez
- Steven Hartley as Nicholas Cogez
- Bruce McGill as William the Blacksmith
- Andrew Bicknell as Stephens
- Farren Monet Daniels as Aloise
- Madylin Sweeten as Young Aloise
- Fred Van Kuyk as Mayor Kessling
- Frederick Oxby as Young Robert Kessling
- Julien Bosman as Robert Kessling
- Bouli Lanners as Constable
- Anne Grandhenry as Stephen's Wife
- Dirk Lavrysen as Peter Paul Rubens

== Publicity ==
Jon Voight and Cheryl Ladd gave several interviews to promote the film in the summer of 1999.

== Critical reception ==
Stephen Holden of The New York Times did not care for the film:

Some sugarcoating is only to be expected in a family movie. But when that film is clogged with sticky-sweet pieties cooed to saucer-eyed tots, the product can be difficult to swallow... A Dog of Flanders is directed by Kevin Brodie in a style that might charitably be called "Christmas pageant cute". Even Mr. Voight, one of our most reliable character actors, is hopelessly wooden. Flailing around in this sea of sugary bromides, he adopts an accent even more indeterminate than the one he came up with for Anaconda.

The film holds a rating of 24% on Rotten Tomatoes based on 25 reviews. The site's consensus states: "Bleak tale, terrible acting." Metacritic, which uses a weighted average, assigned the film a score of 38 out of 100, based on 19 critics, indicating "generally unfavorable" reviews.
