= David Reivers =

Jamaican-American actor

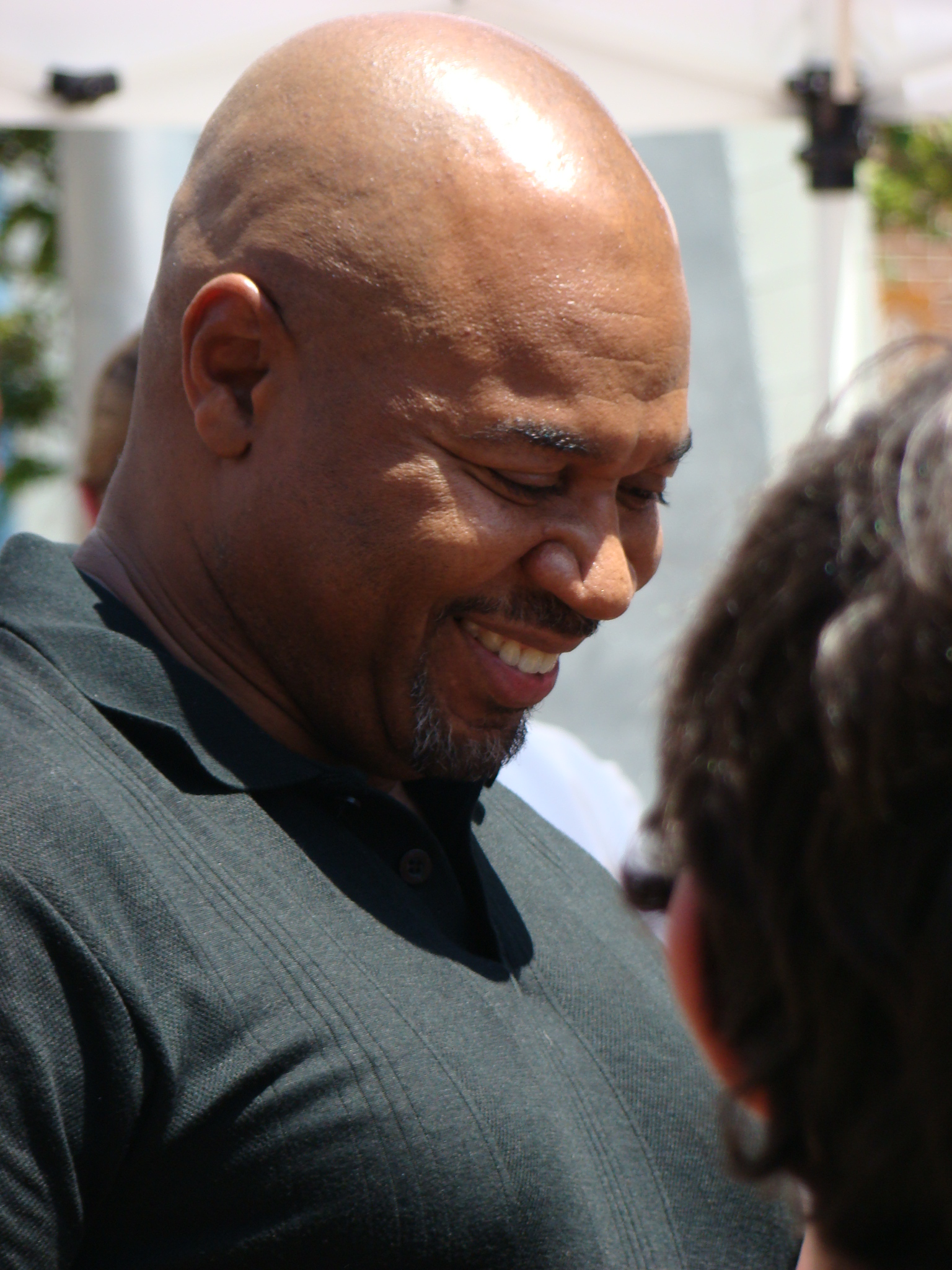
- Reivers in 2007
- Born: 21 November 1958 (age 67); Kingston, Jamaica
- Occupation: Actor
- Spouse: Martha Callari
- Children: 4, including Corbin Bleu

David Reivers (born 21 November 1958) is a Jamaican–American actor and the father of fellow actor Corbin Bleu. He is best known for co-starring as his real-life son's father in the Disney Channel Original Movie Jump In! and High School Musical 3: Senior Year, and in Free Style. He also had a recurring role as Bob Cowan in the supernatural television series Charmed (2001–02).

== Filmography ==
Year	Title	Role	Notes
1992	Malcolm X	Elijah Muhammad's FOI #1	
1999	The Thirteenth Year	Math Teacher	TV movie
1999	Felicity	Housing Worker	Episode: "Sophomoric"
2001-2002	Charmed	Bob Cowan	8 episodes
2002	Malevolent	Ray Bressler	
2003	24	Plainclothes Officer	1 episode
2004	Lucky	Lucky	Voice
2004	After the Sunset	Bahamian Cop	
2005	Drake & Josh	Police Officer	Episode: "The Drake and Josh Inn"
2006	Gilmore Girls	Police Officer	Episode: "A House Is Not a Home"; The officer that Lorelai spoke with when Rory was arrested for stealing a boat with Logan.
2006	Poseidon	John	
2007	Jump In!	Kenneth Daniels	TV movie (lead character Izzy is played by son Corbin)
2008	High School Musical 3: Senior Year	Chad's Dad – Charlie Danforth	(Chad is played by son Corbin)
2009	Free Style	Dell Bryant	
2009	Reese Cereal Commercial	Himself	
2009	GEICO Commercial	Himself	
2010	Desperate Housewives	Sergeant Clemente	Episode: "The Ballad of Booth"
2012	Scary or Die	Gran Pere	('Lover Come Back')
2015	Circle	Bruce	
2016	The Fosters	Norman	2 episodes
