= Mugsy's Girls =

1985 film

- Directed by: Kevin Brodie
- Written by: Kevin Brodie
- Starring: Laura Branigan; Ruth Gordon
- Release date: April 19, 1985

Mugsy's Girls, also known as Delta Pi, is a 1984 film featuring pop singer Laura Branigan and Ruth Gordon. It tells the story of a sorority traveling to Las Vegas to participate in a mud wrestling competition. Their goal is to raise money to save their house. The film was released in theaters in 1985.

This is one of Gordon's final films (along with the three other films she made around this time that were released posthumously). She plays the sorority house-mother who ends up wrestling at the end. The film also features genre stars Eddie Deezen and Kristi Somers. Although Laura Branigan was quite famous as a singer by the time the filming began, she contributed no music to the film; most songs were performed by fellow cast member Joanna Dierck, who at one point was married to the film's writer and director Kevin Brodie.

== Plot ==
A group of college students enter a mud-wrestling contest in Las Vegas in order to pay their debts on their sorority house.

== Cast ==
- Ruth Gordon - Mugsy
- Laura Branigan - Monica
- Eddie Deezen - Lane

== Release ==
Under the title Delta Pi, the movie was first released in Atlanta on April 19, 1985. The film would also open in Chicago on May 10, and in Boston and Fort Worth on September 13.

Under the title Mugsy's Girls, the movie would be released on home video in 1986.
