= Eight on the Lam =

1967 film by George Marshall

- Directed by: George Marshall
- Screenplay by: Albert E. Lewin; Burt Styler; Bob Fisher; Arthur Marx
- Story by: Bob Fisher; Arthur Marx
- Produced by: Bill Lawrence
- Starring: Bob Hope; Phyllis Diller; Jonathan Winters
- Cinematography: Alan Stensvold
- Edited by: R.A. Radecki; Grant Whytock
- Music by: George Romanis
- Production company: Hope Enterprises
- Distributed by: United Artists
- Release date: April 29, 1967
- Running time: 107 minutes
- Country: United States
- Language: English
- Box office: $3,107,644 (US/ Canada)

Eight on the Lam is a 1967 American comedy film directed by George Marshall. It stars Bob Hope and Phyllis Diller.

== Plot ==
Bank teller Henry Dimsdale finds ten $1,000 bills. He is a widower with seven kids and could use the money, and housekeeper Golda tells him it's a case of finders keepers.

Henry waits two weeks to see if anyone claims the missing money. No one does, so he splurges on a new car and a diamond ring for Ellie Barton, his fiancee. But when the bank discovers a $50,000 shortage, Henry becomes a prime suspect. He, his family and Ellie take it on the lam to Arizona.

A detective, Jasper Lynch, the boyfriend of Golda, is assigned to investigate. Henry's boss at the bank, Pomeroy, is seen with a sexy younger woman, Monica, who has expensive tastes. After a chase, Henry is placed under arrest. His kids hide a tape recorder in Pomeroy's pocket, though, and get an admission of guilt. That frees their dad to marry Ellie while the helpful Golda and Jasper do likewise.

== Cast ==
- Bob Hope as Henry Dimsdale
- Phyllis Diller as Golda
- Jonathan Winters as Police Sgt. Jasper Lynch / Mother Lynch
- Shirley Eaton as Ellie Barton
- Jill St. John as Monica
- Stacey Gregg as Linda (credited as Stacey Maxwell)
- Kevin Brodie as Steve
- Robert Hope as Mike
- Glenn Gilger as Andy
- Avis Hope as Dana
- Debi Storm as Lois
- Michael Freeman as Mark
- Austin Willis as Mr. Pomeroy
- Peter Leeds as Marty
- Charles Lane as bank examiner
- Robert Foulk as detective
- Jonathan Hole as jewelry salesman

== Production ==
Bob Hope saw Shirley Eaton in a cafeteria in Hollywood where she was making The Scorpio Letters. He remembered her from working together on a show in Britain and offered her a role in the film.

== See also ==
- List of American films of 1967
