= Kevin Brodie =

American film director

- Born: May 31, 1952 (age 74)
- Occupations: Film director, screenwriter, former child actor
- Spouse: Joanna Dierck
- Children: 1
- Parent(s): Steve Brodie; Barbara Ann Stillwell

Kevin Brodie (born May 31, 1952) is an American film director, screenwriter, and former child actor. He is the son of actors Steve Brodie and Barbara Ann Stillwell.

== Career ==
As a child, Brodie had small roles in such films as Some Came Running (directed by Vincente Minnelli, 1958), The Five Pennies (1959) and Battle at Bloody Beach (1961). His first major role was in The Night of the Grizzly (1966), playing the son of Clint Walker. In 1967, he appeared in the comedy Eight on the Lam. During the same period he also made guest appearances on such popular television shows as Cheyenne, Ben Casey, Death Valley Days, My Three Sons, Mister Ed, and Mannix. In 1975 he was one of the leads in the low budget sci-fi thriller The Giant Spider Invasion, appearing with his father, Steve Brodie.

In the 1970s, he moved into production, working as an assistant director, line producer and writer. He has written and directed a small number of films in genres ranging from exploitation comedy (Delta Pi a.k.a. Mugsy's Girls, 1985) to thriller (Treacherous, 1993) and family fare (A Dog of Flanders, 1999).

== Personal life ==
He was married to Joanna Dierck (born January 3, 1953), who has appeared in some of his films. His daughter is actress Farren Monet (born November 8, 1987), who appeared in A Dog of Flanders.

== Filmography ==
=== Film ===
Year	Title	Role	Notes
1961	Battle at Bloody Beach	Timmy Thompson	
1963	Showdown	Buster	
1966	The Night of the Grizzly	Charlie Cole	
1967	Eight on the Lam	Steve	
1975	The Giant Spider Invasion	Perkins	
1984	Delta Pi	Party Stoner	

=== Television ===
Year	Title	Role	Notes
1961	The Life and Legend of Wyatt Earp	Butch Byfield	Episode: "A Papa for Butch and Ginger"
1961	Cheyenne	Bart Ainslie	Episode: "Retaliation"
1962	Mister Ed	Joey	Episode: "Wilbur the Good Samaritan"
1962	Ben Casey	Tommy Marsh	2 episodes
1962	Wagon Train	David Levy	Episode: "The Levy-McGowan Story"
1962	Medicine Man	Chris	Television film
1963	McKeever and the Colonel	Peter	Episode: "Love Comes to Westfield"
1963	The Great Adventure	Michael Judson	Episode: "The Outlaw and the Nun"
1964, 1965	Death Valley Days	Jamie Wilson / Eddy Wiley	2 episodes
1964–1969	My Three Sons	Wayne / George / Gordy	7 episodes
1964–1973	Lassie	2nd Surfer / Cullen / Frank McClellan	4 episodes
1965	The Fugitive	Johnny	Episode: "Nicest Fella You'd Ever Want to Meet"
1968	Off to See the Wizard	Mike Malone	Episode: "Mike and the Mermaid"
1971	The Smith Family	Ron Walding	Episode: "Blind Chance"
1972	Lassie: Joyous Sound	Dark-Haired Surfer	Television film
1973	Mannix	Punchbowl	Episode: "The Gang's All Here"
1973	Room 222	Woody	Episode: "Mismatch Maker"

== Bibliography ==
- Holmstrom, John. The Moving Picture Boy: An International Encyclopaedia from 1895 to 1995. Norwich, Michael Russell, 1996, p. 294.
