= Charles Chun =

American actor

- Born: February 28, 1967 (age 59)
- Occupation: Actor
- Years active: 1994–present

Charles Chun (born February 28, 1967) is an American actor who has appeared in television shows such as Criminal Minds, Scrubs, Everybody Loves Raymond, Ned's Declassified School Survival Guide, and How I Met Your Mother.

He has also appeared in motion pictures such as Beverly Hills Cop III, Dumb & Dumber, Double Tap, The Interview, and My Favorite Martian. In 1996, he guest starred in the popular Star Trek: Deep Space Nine episode "Trials and Tribble-ations"; in which he played a Starfleet engineer serving aboard the original USS Enterprise from Star Trek: The Original Series.

He appeared in a single episode of The O.C - as the man who evicts Julie Cooper from Caleb Nichol's home, as a doctor in an episode of Beyond Belief: Fact or Fiction and as a call-girl-obsessed former brother in law of a District Attorney in Castle's second season. He also made a guest-star appearance in Big Time Rush, as Lucy's dad.

== Select TV and filmography ==
Title	Year	Role
Scary or Die	2012	Taejung ('Taejung's Lament')
The Haunting of Molly Hartley	2008	Doctor
Next	2007	Davis
General Hospital	2003–2011	Dr. Misra/Dr. Greenwald (7 episodes)
Scrubs	2001–2009	Dr. Wen (21 episodes)
The Young and the Restless	1996–2004	Dr. Jerry Lee/Surgeon (7 episodes)
Star Trek: Deep Space Nine	1996	Engineer (1 episode)
Diagnosis Murder	1996	various (2 episodes)
The Single Guy	1996	Policeman (2 episodes)
Chicago Hope	1995	Orderly (1 episode)
Dumb and Dumber	1994	Flight attendant
Beverly Hills Cop III	1994	Technician
