= Flight 29 Down =

Television series

- Genre: Adventure; Teen drama
- Created by: Stan Rogow; D. J. MacHale
- Written by: D. J. MacHale; Stan Rogow (pilot only)
- Directed by: Steve De Jarnatt; Neal Israel; D. J. MacHale; Tim O'Donnell
- Starring: Allen Alvarado; Corbin Bleu; Hallee Hirsh; Jeremy Kissner; Johnny Pacar; Lauren Storm; Kristy Wu
- Country of origin: United States
- Original language: English
- No. of seasons: 2
- No. of episodes: 26 + 1 film

Production
- Executive producers: Jim Rapsas; Stan Rogow; D. J. MacHale; Shauna Shapiro Jackson; Gina Watumull; Rann Watumull
- Production locations: Mahalo, Hawaii
- Camera setup: Single-camera
- Running time: 24 minutes
- Production companies: Stan Rogow Productions; Discovery Communications

Original release
- Network: Discovery Kids
- Release: October 1, 2005 – August 25, 2007

Flight 29 Down is an American adventure teen drama television series about a group of teenagers who are stranded on an island. Broadcast from 2005 to 2007, it was produced by Discovery Kids. The show was created by Stan Rogow (Lizzie McGuire, Darcy's Wild Life) and D. J. MacHale (Are You Afraid of the Dark?, The Pendragon book series). The executive producers are Rogow, MacHale, Shauna Shapiro Jackson, and Gina & Rann Watumull.

The third and final season of the series was produced as a four-part film instead of the episodic format of the first two seasons. The film, Flight 29 Down: The Hotel Tango, aired in August 2007. In addition, the series was broadcast Saturday mornings on NBC as part of the Discovery Kids on NBC brand from 2005 to 2006.

The show was filmed on the island of Oahu in Hawaii.

== Premise ==
The show follows a group of teens stranded on a South Pacific island in the Federated States of Micronesia after they crash their plane (a De Havilland Heron) in a tropical storm while flying to an eco-adventure camping trip in Palau. A plot device of a video diary powered by a solar battery charger allows the kids to talk about themselves and to the camera about their difficult everyday struggles, the island, and each other.

The series bore superficial similarities to Lost, an adult-oriented drama that debuted a year before Flight 29 Down, but Flight 29 Down never incorporated any supernatural elements as Lost eventually did. It also has many similarities with The New People and with Gordon Korman's Island trilogy.

== Characters ==
The main cast of Flight 29 Down (from left to right): Johnny Pacar, Kristy Wu, Hallee Hirsh, Allen Alvarado, Corbin Bleu, Jeremy Kissner, and Lauren Storm.

=== Main ===
- Allen Alvarado as Lex Marin, the youngest of the group and Daley's younger stepbrother who is highly intelligent and resourceful.
- Corbin Bleu as Nathan McHugh, a former Boy Scout who finds his survival training less useful on the island.
- Hallee Hirsh as Daley Marin, Lex's stepsister, the class president who tries to take charge but frequently alienates the others with her arrogance.
- Jeremy Kissner as Eric McGorrill, a slacker and a comedian who tends to manipulate people to get out of various responsibilities and chores.
- Johnny Pacar as Cody Jackson, the group's first elected leader, a quiet kid who comes from a poorer part of town and has a mysterious past.
- Lauren Storm as Taylor Hagan, spoiled, self-centered kid who is initially oblivious to the danger the group is in.
- Kristy Wu as Melissa Wu, a level-headed and sensitive kid who is harboring a secret crush on Jackson.

=== The "Lost" ===
- Tani Lynn Fujimoto as Abby Fujimoto, one of the survivors who goes on a long journey with Captain Russell, Ian, and Jory to reach the north shore of the island to find something to aide their rescue. She is hardened by her experiences as she shifts to darker and harsher attitude.
- B. K. Cannon as Jory Cavanaugh, one of the survivors who went off to explore the island with Captain Russell.
- Blade Rogers as Ian Bedawan, one of the survivors who went off to explore the island with Captain Russell.
- John Kapelos as Captain Bob Russell, the only adult of the group, who takes a few of the kids into the island to find signs of civilization and later sustains a head injury which caused him to go crazy.

== Episodes ==
Note: All episodes of the series were written by D. J. MacHale, "The Arrival" was written by Stan Rogow.

=== Series overview ===
Season	Episodes	Originally released	
Season	Episodes	First released	Last released
1	13	October 1, 2005	March 18, 2006
2	13	September 9, 2006	March 10, 2007
Television film	1	August 25, 2007	

=== Season 1 (2005–06) ===
No. overall	No. in season	Title	Directed by	Original release date
1	1	"The Arrival"	D. J. MacHale	October 1, 2005
Ten high schoolers take off on an eco-camping adventure to Micronesia. They are caught in a storm and crash-land on a uninhabited island where they must learn how to survive by finding food and water while living in a world without the rules of home.
2	2	"The Quest For Fire"	D. J. MacHale	October 8, 2005
The pilot and three of the survivors go off in search of life on the island. Daley and Lex hunt for the perfect campsite and find some unwanted guests. Nathan and Melissa try to build a fire without matches.
3	3	"It's Lonely at the Top"	D. J. MacHale	October 22, 2005
Daley and Nathan each feel they should be in charge of the group. To stop the arguing, they are given a day to prove who would make the better leader. The ultimate decision will be made by a secret ballot election.
4	4	"Not a Drop to Drink"	Steve De Jarnatt	November 5, 2005
Jackson has been elected leader, but refuses to lead. The bigger problem is drinking water. While Daley and Eric search for a source of fresh water, Nathan tries to create intricate devices that will gather water from the air.
5	5	"A Fish Story"	Steve De Jarnatt	November 19, 2005
The camping food is running out. While Nathan, Daley and Lex hunt for food in the jungle, Jackson tries to catch fish and Eric pretends to be injured so as not to have to work at all.
6	6	"The Pits"	D. J. MacHale	November 26, 2005
Daley is fed up with Taylor because she isn't doing her share of work, while Lex finds a signal kite that he and Nathan build together.
7	7	"The Cry of the Wolf"	D. J. MacHale	December 3, 2005
Lex discovers a new source for food that might be poisonous. Eric blackmails Melissa into doing all of his work.
8	8	"Survival of the Fittest"	Tim O'Donnell	December 10, 2005
Taylor discovers a secret about Melissa that she shares with everyone. Meanwhile, Daley and Nathan track down and try to catch a wild pig.
9	9	"Mazeathon"	Tim O'Donnell	January 21, 2006
Tempers run high when Jackson nearly gets in a fight with Nathan and Daley. Meanwhile, Lex tries to build morale by creating an elaborate obstacle course for a friendly competition.
10	10	"Eight is Enough"	D. J. MacHale	January 28, 2006
While traveling far from the beach in search of food, Nathan and Eric discover a distress message tied to a tree in the jungle that proves they aren't alone on the island.
11	11	"Abby Normal"	Tim O'Donnell	February 4, 2006
One of the original survivors that left to search the island, returns to the beach. Abby finds it difficult to fit in with the group because there have been so many changes since the crash.
12	12	"Until Proven Guilty"	D. J. MacHale	March 11, 2006
Everyone has been making video diaries to document their personal feelings about the trip and each other. They awake one morning to discover the diaries have been stolen. All of their deepest secrets are in danger of being exposed.
13	13	"Scratch"	D. J. MacHale	March 18, 2006
A disturbing secret is revealed about Jackson that prompts him to leave the survivors and travel across the island on his own. The timing couldn't be worse as a giant monsoon bears down on the island.

=== Season 2 (2006–07) ===
No. overall	No. in season	Title	Directed by	Original release date
14	1	"Look Who's Not Talking"	D. J. MacHale	September 9, 2006
After a tropical storm destroys their shelter, the castaways must begin the process of rebuilding.
15	2	"Groundbreaking"	D. J. MacHale	September 16, 2006
Eric finds a mysterious box that can't be opened and the castaways fantasize about the contents.
16	3	"She Said, He Said, She Said"	Steve De Jarnatt	September 23, 2006
Melissa inadvertently reveals a secret that Nathan has been keeping.
17	4	"The Uninvited"	Steve De Jarnatt	September 30, 2006
Eric accidentally breaks the lighter that is the only source of fire while a large lizard makes its home in the castaways' tent.
18	5	"The Tide"	Steve De Jarnatt	October 7, 2006
The wreck of the airplane washes back on shore and Nathan gets trapped under it.
19	6	"Where There's Smoke"	D. J. MacHale	October 14, 2006
The castaways decide to turn the plane wreck into a shelter.
20	7	"Home Sweet Home"	D. J. MacHale	October 21, 2006
The castaways attempt the impossible by moving the plane wreck off the beach to higher ground.
21	8	"Chilloween"	D. J. MacHale	February 3, 2007
Taylor plans a holiday celebration to bolster everyone's spirits.
22	9	"Regrets"	D. J. MacHale	February 10, 2007
Jackson collapses due to a mystery illness and Melissa blames herself.
23	10	"The Drift"	Neal Israel	February 17, 2007
The castaways build and test a raft out on the open water.
24	11	"Good Luck Abby"	D. J. MacHale	February 24, 2007
Abby faces hardship in the jungle.
25	12	"One Breath Away"	D. J. MacHale	March 3, 2007
Abby returns to camp and shakes things up.
26	13	"See Ya"	D. J. MacHale	March 10, 2007
The castaways split into two groups with different ideas on how to survive.

=== Television film (2007) ===
Title	Original release date
"The Hotel Tango"	August 25, 2007
Part 1: With the group split in two, tension mounts on the beach as Lex blames Daley for the break-up while those that left begin their mission to find life on the island. Part 2: Nathan creates a new signal to grab the attention of passing ships, while the team that is exploring the island discovers they are not alone. Part 3: The fate of Jory, Ian and Captain Russell is discovered. Lex invents a flashing beacon from parts of the plane wreck. Part 4: Captain Russell threatens revenge after the accidental destruction of his boat. There is a race to get back to the beach to protect Daley, Lex, Taylor and Nathan before Russell can do any damage.

== Series synopsis ==
=== First season ===
A flight with ten teenagers and a pilot crashes on a tropical island after a storm results in an engine explosion. They all survive the crash. Three of the teenagers and the pilot leave to explore the island. The rest elect a leader and try to survive on their own. A huge monsoon ruins the camp and their communication equipment; however, brief contact with another plane had been established before the destruction.

=== Second season ===
The group continue to survive but a storm left their camp in ruins, as well as their plane washed out to sea. One of the characters, Daley, is elected the new leader and she begins a democracy. The plane washes back on shore with a huge hole on its side. The survivors begin to learn that the island was involved in World War II when they find a time capsule from a general who once inhabited the island. They soon figure out there must be some life on the island.

=== Film ===
"Flight 29 Down: The Hotel Tango" was released in 2007 as the series finale. The castaways split into two groups. One stays on the beach, and one travels to find life on the island. Just when they think the place is deserted, they find an old concrete hotel used in WWII, along with other old buildings rotting away. They find the pilot, and the two other survivors in the hotel. The pilot has a bad sickness that makes him go crazy. In the end the castaways are saved by the US Navy just before Typhoon Melissa hits the island and destroys everything.

== Home releases ==
All seasons have been released on DVD. The first season was released individually in 3 volumes, but later released on a first season package. Season 2 was released in one package and the series finale was released separate from the other DVDs.

In 2008, all the seasons have been released on DVD in Sweden by Pan Vision.

== Book releases ==
=== Sequential releases ===
Book#	Title	Author	Release date
1	"Static"	Walter Sorrells	February 2, 2006
2	"The Seven"	John Vornholt	February 2, 2006
3	"The Return"	John Vornholt	June 1, 2006
4	"The Storm"	Brad Strickland	August 3, 2006
5	"Scratch"	Walter Sorrells	November 23, 2006
6	"On Fire"	Walter Sorrells	February 15, 2007
7	"Survival"	Walter Sorrells	June 14, 2007

=== Special releases ===
Title	Author	Release date
"Ten Rules: Prequel"	Walter Sorrells	October 5, 2006

== Differences between the books and the series ==
- In the episode "Groundbreaking", the castaways individually approach the box and imagine what would be in it, but in the book Scratch, the survivors have a meeting and explain what they thought the box was filled with.
- In the book Ten Rules, Lex's parents had a divorce, but in the film, he mentions that his dad died.
- The episode "Survival Of The Fittest" is before the episode "Mazeathon", but in the books, it's the other way around.
- The books have parts added to them that are not in the series.
- In the book Static, Melissa had the idea to have an election, but in the series, the kids all contributed to the idea.
- In the book Scratch, "Groundbreaking" is supposed to be first, but "He Said, She Said, He Said" is before that episode.
- In the books, the episodes "The Tide" and "Home Sweet Home" had been cut out in the storyline because they finished building Lex's shelter.
- In the book Static, Daley and Nathan go to the back of the plane to get the life raft; in the episode "Arrival", they do not.
- In the book Scratch, Melissa tells only Daley that Nathan likes her, not everybody at once.
- In the episode "Chilloween", Jackson plays "I Won't Stand Alone" but in the books he doesn't.
- In the book actions happen earlier or later it, is twisted
- In the episode "Mazeathon", Jackson wears converse low-tops, whereas in the book he wears sandals that blistered his feet, which had him running slower, so he took off the strap sandals to sprint barefoot as opposed to kicking off his chucks.
- In Mazethon novel Nathan wore slip-on converse low-tops, while Jackson ran in bare feet.
- In the book a slight romance between Abby and Ian is mentioned, but in the series it is not.
- In the book, the stories of the "lost" kids are explored more than in the series.

== Music ==
Sam Winans composed most of the music of Flight 29 Down. Corbin Bleu, Nathan McHugh, sang "Circles" in the background in the episode, "He Said, She Said, He Said."

== Broadcasts ==
The series aired on Discovery Kids and premiered in the United States on October 1, 2005. The final episode aired on August 25, 2007. After the series ended, reruns continued to air on The Hub until December 24, 2011. The show is available for streaming on Peacock and Tubi TV in the United States.

The first season was aired on SVT (Sweden) during Summer 2006, as a part of the breakfast show Hej Hej sommar (Hello, Hello Summer). The second season aired in the same program during summer 2007, and started August 7. It has had reruns as part of the summer program "Sommarlov" both 2012 and 2013. The show aired in Finland (season 1 and season 2) during Summer 2006 as a part of the breakfast show Summeri. It is also aired on the Belgium channel Ketnet.

The show premiered in Portugal on September 17, 2011, the show airs in English with Portuguese subtitles on SIC.

The show premiered in Latin America, March 10, 2007, at 21:00 on Boomerang.

The show's first season also aired on TV3 Slovenia during the Summer of 2007. It is not known if TV3 Slovenia will air the second season or the film, The Hotel Tango.

The show premiered in Canada on Family on June 2, 2007, and on CHRGD on February 7, 2017. The show also was aired in Saudi Arabia by MBC4

It was shown in Brazil by TV Cultura in 2008, from Monday to Friday, at 7 pm (Brasilia Time), under the title in Portuguese "Resgate Vôo 29" (Flight Rescue 29).

The first two seasons aired in Japan on NHK from June 2009 to March 2010. It was titled Totsuzen! Sabaibaru (Suddenly! Survival). The film was aired as season 3.

In Australia and New Zealand, the show was aired on Foxtel on the channel Nickelodeon every Saturday Night.

In Turkey, the show aired on TV8.
