= Jump In! =

2007 television film directed by Paul Hoen

- Promotional poster
- Written by: Doreen Spicer-Dannelly; Regina Y. Hicks; Karin Gist
- Directed by: Paul Hoen
- Starring: Corbin Bleu; Keke Palmer; David Reivers; Shanica Knowles; Laivan Greene; Kylee Russell
- Narrated by: Patrick Johnson Jr.
- Theme music composer: Frank Fitzpatrick
- Countries of origin: United States; Canada
- Original language: English

Production
- Producer: Kevin Lafferty
- Cinematography: David A. Makin
- Editor: Janice Hampton
- Running time: 85 minutes
- Production companies: Davis Entertainment; Hop, Skip and Jump Productions

Original release
- Network: Disney Channel
- Release: January 12, 2007

Jump In! is a 2007 sports comedy-drama film released as a Disney Channel Original Movie, which premiered on January 12, 2007. It was released on Disney Channel UK on April 27, 2007. The film, starring Corbin Bleu and Keke Palmer, revolves around a young boxer, Izzy Daniels (Bleu), who trains to follow in his father's footsteps by winning the Golden Glove. When his friend, Mary (Palmer), asks him to substitute for a team member in a Double Dutch tournament, Izzy discovers his new love for the sport. At the same time, he discovers true love in Mary and he deals with the conflict between him and his father about boxing. Filming took place in June and July 2006 in Toronto, Ontario, Canada.

== Plot ==
Isadore "Izzy" Daniels is a star boxer in Brooklyn training to win the Golden Gloves, like his widowed father and coach Kenneth. His neighbor, Mary Thomas, is a competitive Double Dutch player on a team called the Joy Jumpers. Despite their constant bickering, the two have mutual crushes.

When the Joy Jumpers lose a teammate, Yolanda, to their rivals, the Dutch Dragons, Mary convinces a skeptical Izzy to join as a replacement. He secretly practices with the team before school, and his jump rope skills improve rapidly—though his boxing suffers. Izzy commits to the team permanently, and they rename themselves the Hot Chili Steppers. However, when his father shows up with boxing match tickets on the day of a Double Dutch exhibition, Izzy bails on the team rather than reveal his secret. Mary kicks him off in anger.

Izzy's classmate and rival, Rodney Tyler, discovers Izzy's Double Dutch involvement and plasters embarrassing photos around school. When Mary tries to recruit Izzy back, he refuses. Kenneth also discovers the truth, and Izzy confesses that since his mother's death, Kenneth only talks about boxing—and that Izzy no longer enjoys the sport, continuing only for his father's sake. Kenneth accepts his apology but walks away.

Encouraged by his fellow boxer Tammy Lewis, Izzy finds new resolve. When Rodney demands a rematch, Izzy accepts but uses his Double Dutch footwork to dodge every attack, then walks away from the fight, declaring that violence won't settle their issues. Rodney is impressed by Izzy's courage.

At the city finals, Izzy reunites with the Hot Chili Steppers. The competition against the Dutch Dragons comes down to the freestyle tiebreaker. With Kenneth, Karin, and his friends watching, Izzy performs an impressive routine. The Hot Chili Steppers win first place. Kenneth apologizes, explaining that boxing was his way of staying close to Izzy after losing his mother, and tells Izzy he's proud. Rodney calls a truce and asks Izzy to teach him the moves. The film ends with a flash-forward revealing that the Steppers went on to win state the following year, and that Mary and Izzy are still together.

== Cast ==
- Corbin Bleu as "Izzy" Daniels,
- Keke Palmer as Mary
- David Reivers as Kenneth Daniels,
- Shanica Knowles as Shauna
- Laivan Greene as Keisha
- Kylee Russell as Karin
- Patrick Johnson. as Rodney
- Micah Williams as Earl "L'il Earl"
- Rebecca Williams as Tammy
- Jajube Mandiela as Yolanda Brooks,
- Mazin Elsadig as Chuck
- Paula Brancati as Gina,
- Gene Mack as Felix,

== Production ==
The film was originally set to star Raven-Symoné and be named Double Dutch, but due to the actress' busy schedule at the time, it was later revamped into Jump In! with Corbin Bleu.

Actress and singer China Anne McClain, who later went on to star in the Disney Channel series A.N.T. Farm, auditioned for and won an undisclosed role in the film but turned it down to instead star in the television series Tyler Perry's House of Payne as Jazmine Payne, after catching Tyler Perry's attention.

Jump In! is the 67th Disney Channel Original Movie and went into production in 2006. Earlier titles for the film included "Jump", "Jump In" and "Jump Start", with some early trailers even showing the "Jump Start" title.

In the movie, Izzy Daniels renames the Double Dutch team, dubbing them the Hot Chili Steppers. This is a parody of Red Hot Chili Peppers, a real-life rock band. The version in Spanish dubs the name as Salto Extrapicante.

Promotion for the film began in the summer of 2006, with a poster appearing in the program for the High School Musical Tour. Advertisements highlighted Corbin Bleu's association with High School Musical (as Chad Danforth; High School Musical 3: Senior Year would see Corbin's dad David Reivers again cast as the father of Corbin's character) and ran heavily during re-airings of that film. Several videos from the film were also put into heavy rotation on Disney Channel, airing during breaks in regular programming.

Corbin Bleu became very good at jumping and even performed some of his own stunts like the donkey kick and push-ups, but he did have a stunt double for some of the jumping like backflips and individual jumping. At the end of the movie, Andy Royalle makes a guest appearance as one of the jump-ropers. During the final contest, an actual champion Double Dutch team from Brooklyn makes a cameo. They just happened to be in Toronto for a tournament at the same time the movie was being filmed.

Jump In! was the last Disney Channel Original Movie to use the 2002–2006 Disney Channel Movie intro; later DCOM films used the remixed version.

The story of Jump In! was originally written by Sherwyn Smith, who now works as a teacher at an elite private school in Brooklyn Heights, New York.

== Reception ==
Jump In! broke the record previously set by The Cheetah Girls 2 as the highest rated DCOM premiere with 8.2 million viewers. At the time it marked Corbin Bleu's second #1 hit for the Disney Channel and Keke Palmer's first. Its ratings record for highest rated DCOM was beat out for later that year by High School Musical 2 (in which Corbin Bleu also starred) on August 17, 2007, which gained 17.24 million viewers, making it Bleu's third #1 hit DCOM.

=== Accolades ===
The film won and was nominated for a number of awards throughout 2007.

Year	Ceremony	Category	Recipients	Result
2007	Teen Choice Awards	Choice TV Movie		Nominated

== Special screenings ==
- Jump In! and Dance It to the Limit: A special screening of the movie with a special dance-along to Push It to the Limit, hosted by the male announcer of Disney Channel.
- Jump In! Jab & Gab: A special screening of the movie, in which viewers play the online game, Jab & Gab and send shout-outs to their friends, family or the cast of the movie.
- Jump In! Pop up Edition: Gives viewers an inside look on different parts of the movie, while popping up on your television. This special screening aired Friday, June 1 on Disney Channel.

== Home media ==
The DVD release of Jump In! "Freestyle Edition" and was released on April 3, 2007. And July 2, 2007 in the United States

Special features include the following:

- Keke Palmer's "Jumpin'" Music Video
- T-Squad's "Vertical" Music Video
- Behind the Scenes Featurette - "Learning the Moves"
- Making of Featurette - "Inside the Ropes"
- Rooa Abdelrahim and Alyssa Gallagher, who appeared in High School Musical (1 and 2), made a cameo in this film during the song "Push It To The Limit"; the two also appeared in the fighting match between Izzy and Rodney.

== Soundtrack ==
Jump In!

Soundtrack album by Various artists
- Released: January 9, 2007
- Recorded: 2006
- Genre: Music
- Length: 44:47
- Label: Walt Disney Records

A soundtrack featuring songs from the movie was released on January 9, 2007. It debuted at #5 on the Billboard 200 on January 27, 2007, with 49,000 copies sold, and rose to #3 in the next week, selling 57,000 copies. In its third week, it fell to number nine with 44,000 copies sold. In February 2007, the album was certified Gold by the RIAA. As of July 8, 2008 the album has sold over 600.000+ copies within the U.S.

Frank Fitzpatrick composed the original score for the film and wrote and produced two songs for the soundtrack, including the single "Jump to the Rhythm", a co-production with Nashville's Keith Thomas featuring Jordan Pruitt.

=== Track listing ===
1. "It's On" – NLT
2. "It's My Turn Now" – Keke Palmer
3. "Push It to the Limit" – Corbin Bleu
4. "Vertical" – T-Squad
5. "Where Do I Go From Here" – Sebastian Mego
6. "Jump to the Rhythm" – Jordan Pruitt
7. "Jumpin’" – Keke Palmer
8. "Go (Jump In! Mix)" – Jupiter Rising
9. "I’m Ready" – Drew Seeley
10. "Gotta Lotta" – Prima J
11. "Live It Up" – Jeannie Ortega
12. "Jump" – Lil' Josh
13. "Let It Go" – Kyle

=== Charts ===
==== Weekly charts ====
Chart (2007)	Peak position
US Billboard 200	3
US Soundtrack Albums (Billboard)	2

==== Year-end charts ====
Chart (2007)	Position
US Billboard 200	111
US Soundtrack Albums (Billboard)	8

=== Certifications ===
Region	Certification	Certified units/sales
United States (RIAA)	Gold	500,000^{^}
^{^} Shipments figures based on certification alone.

== See also ==
- List of boxing films
