= Scary or Die =

- Directed by: Bob Badway; Michael Emanuel; Igor Meglic
- Written by: Bob Badway; Michael Emanuel
- Produced by: Bob Badway; Michael Emanuel; Igor Meglic
- Starring: Domiziano Arcangeli; Corbin Bleu; Bill Oberst Jr.
- Cinematography: Bruce Douglas Johnson; Igor Meglic; James Lawrence Spencer; Byron Werner
- Edited by: Masayoshi Matsuda
- Music by: Shawn K. Clement; Claude Foisy; Hanna Lim; Christopher Young
- Production companies: Canal Street Films; Bleuman
- Distributed by: Phase 4 Films
- Release date: May 1, 2012 (VOD)
- Running time: 94 minutes
- Country: United States
- Language: English

Scary or Die is a 2012 American anthology horror film directed by Bob Badway, Michael Emanuel, and Igor Meglic. The film was released on video on demand on May 1, 2012 and on DVD on September 11, 2012. Initially titled Terror Bytes, the film's name was later changed to coincide with a horror website by the same name that Emanuel ran with his co-director Igor Meglic and two other filmmakers.

The anthology stars Corbin Bleu and Bill Oberst Jr. and is composed of five interlocking stories set within the city of Los Angeles.

== Synopsis ==
The film is framed as a person browsing the Scary or Die website and watching each short film on their personal computer.

=== The Crossing ===
Buck and his friends, Keith and Connie, are driving to the Mexico-United States border. On the way, they visit a convenience store, where Keith murders the store's Mexican cashier. Unknown to Connie, Buck and Keith have been regularly patrolling the Mexico–United States border with the intention to capture and murder anyone they believe to be an illegal immigrant out of the belief that immigrants are a detriment to the United States. To Connie's horror, she is also a zombie.

=== TaeJung's Lament ===
TaeJung Lee begins to follow around various women who resemble his late wife shortly after her death. On one such occasion he witnesses a woman being kidnapped. TaeJung rescues her and, in gratitude, the woman, named Min-ah, urges him to meet her the following Friday night. Upon arriving, Min-ah and her friends, revealed to be vampires, seduce and draw blood from TaeJung. Meanwhile, the man who attempted to kidnap Min-ah, Van Helsing approaches her apartment with vampire-hunting gear.

=== Re-Membered ===
Sam Franks dismembers a man he assassinated, named Colvin, in his bathtub, and writes a note to request payment for the hit. Afterwards, he puts Colvin's body in a duffel bag and places it in his car. While driving, he hears the sound of the corpse banging from inside the trunk, and becomes distracted enough for a police officer to pull him over. The officer hears the banging as well, and checks his trunk, but finds nothing and lets Sam leave. After Sam begins driving again, he becomes paranoid about Colvin's body, so he checks his trunk where he finds the duffel bag to be empty other than a pentagram pendant and his payment request having the words "You can't kill me" written on it in blood. He returns to the driver's seat, but sees Colvin in his passenger seat. After Sam leaves the car, Colvin catches him and cuts his head off with the same knife he used to dismember Colvin's body.

=== Clowned ===
Emmett and his girlfriend Kelly are at the beach with Emmett's little brother Andy. While at the beach, they see the Walking Woman before she is killed in Lover Come Back, and are approached by two women, Sage and Angela, offering to buy drugs from Emmett, to which he tells them to come back during business hours. A day later, during Andy's birthday party, Emmett sees Fucko the Clown rummaging through his fridge, so he kicks him out. However, the clown bites Emmett on his shin. That night, Emmett and Kelly conceive a child. The bite causes Emmett to become increasingly sick, so he calls the police. Officers Sam Franks and Romano mention that something similar has happened before. Not long after, Emmett's skin begins to lighten as he turns into a clown and gains a craving for his brother's flesh, so he leaves the house and hides away. After many days, Emmett has fully transformed into a clown, and ends up eating the flesh of a mugger. Now insatiable, he kidnaps Andy with the intent to eat him too, but ultimately allows him to escape. Later, he stalks Andy at the playground, where he is confronted by Officer Sam Franks and Officer Romano, who gun him down after he brandishes a novelty toy gun. The segment ends with Kelly pushing her newborn child in a stroller, who has been born a clown.

=== Lover Come Back ===
The segment consists of a woman (The Walking Woman) monologuing her story over shots of her walking throughout Los Angeles intercut with shots of the relationship she had with her husband, Romano. She describes how, as a young child, her grandfather performed a spell, and gave her a vial filled with the dirt her ancestors were buried in, which she wears to this day. Her relationship with Romano was beautiful until he cheated on her multiple times. Once she stood up for herself, he strangled her to death and put her body in a box, which he left in the woods. While Romano was hooking up with another woman, Angela, his wife returns to kill Romano. It is then revealed that the Walking Woman has been the person watching each short film, including Lover Come Back. Interspersed with the film's credits, she walks back to the box Romano put her corpse in.

== Cast ==
=== The Crossing ===
- Bill Oberst Jr. as Buck
- Hali Lula Hudson as Connie
- Shawn-Caulin Young as Keith
- Erik Contreras as Gonzalez Jr.
- Maxie Santillan Jr. as Gonzalez Sr.
- Basil Pina as store owner
- Travis Jourdain as border patrol 1
- Jason Mesches as border patrol 2
- Jeff Nimoy as radio host
- Lucia Trozzi as Zombie chica
- Ryan Nealy as Mexican zombie

=== TaeJung's Lament ===
- Charles Rahi Chun as TaeJung Lee
- Alexandra Choi as Min-ah
- Azion Lemekeve as Van Helsing
- Anna Moon as Ye-Shin
- Catherine Shu as Min-Ah's minion
- Suzie Latham as Min-Ah's minion
- Katie Cockrell as shoe store girl 1
- Kellie Cockrell as shoe store girl 2
- Jani Wang as Korean vampire woman
- Adelyne Liu as Korean vampire woman
- Paget Kagy as Korean vampire woman
- Catherine Emily Mills as Korean vampire woman
- Alice Ka-Lim Lee and Robert Lee as young Korean couple
- Jun He Park as flower sales woman
- Chon Lee as shoe store manager
- Damond McFarland as car thief
- Andrew McReynolds as car thief
- Alpha Takahashi as front desk clerk
- Ethan Kim as elevator guy

=== Re-Membered ===
- Christopher Darga as Sam Franks
- John Moran as Colvin
- Randy McPherson as motorcycle cop

=== Clowned ===
- Corbin Bleu as Emmett
- Elizabeth Di Prinzio as Kelly
- Domiziano Arcangeli as Fucko
- PaSean Wilson as Frances
- Xavier Davis as Andy
- Christopher Darga as Sam Franks
- Ski-ter Jones as Romano
- Nicole Moore as Angela
- Bob Bouchard as Fucko 2
- Andrew Caldwell as Bill Blotto
- Robert Lee as Ted
- Skylar Rote as Sage
- Aldo Emanuel as playground kid
- Vito Emanuel as playground kid
- Megan Sherman as missing girl

=== Lover Come Back ===
- Shannon Bobo as the Walking Woman
- David Reivers as Gran Pere
- Ski-ter Jones as Romano
- Nicole Moore as Angela
- Phoenix Sage Rivers as little girl

== Reception ==
Ain't It Cool News gave Scary or Die a positive review, stating that "Reminiscent of old school films like Creepshow with its practical effects and unflinchingly wicked tales, this is one indie film worth seeing by as many folks as possible." Dread Central gave a more mixed review and remarked that while they enjoyed the segments Clowned and Re-Membered, they found most of the segments disappointing and could really only recommend it for Clowned. HorrorNews.net criticized the film's segments, commenting that some would serve well as excellent student films but that "this is a commercial release, and the bar is higher."
