= Paul Wontorek =

Broadway journalist and influencer

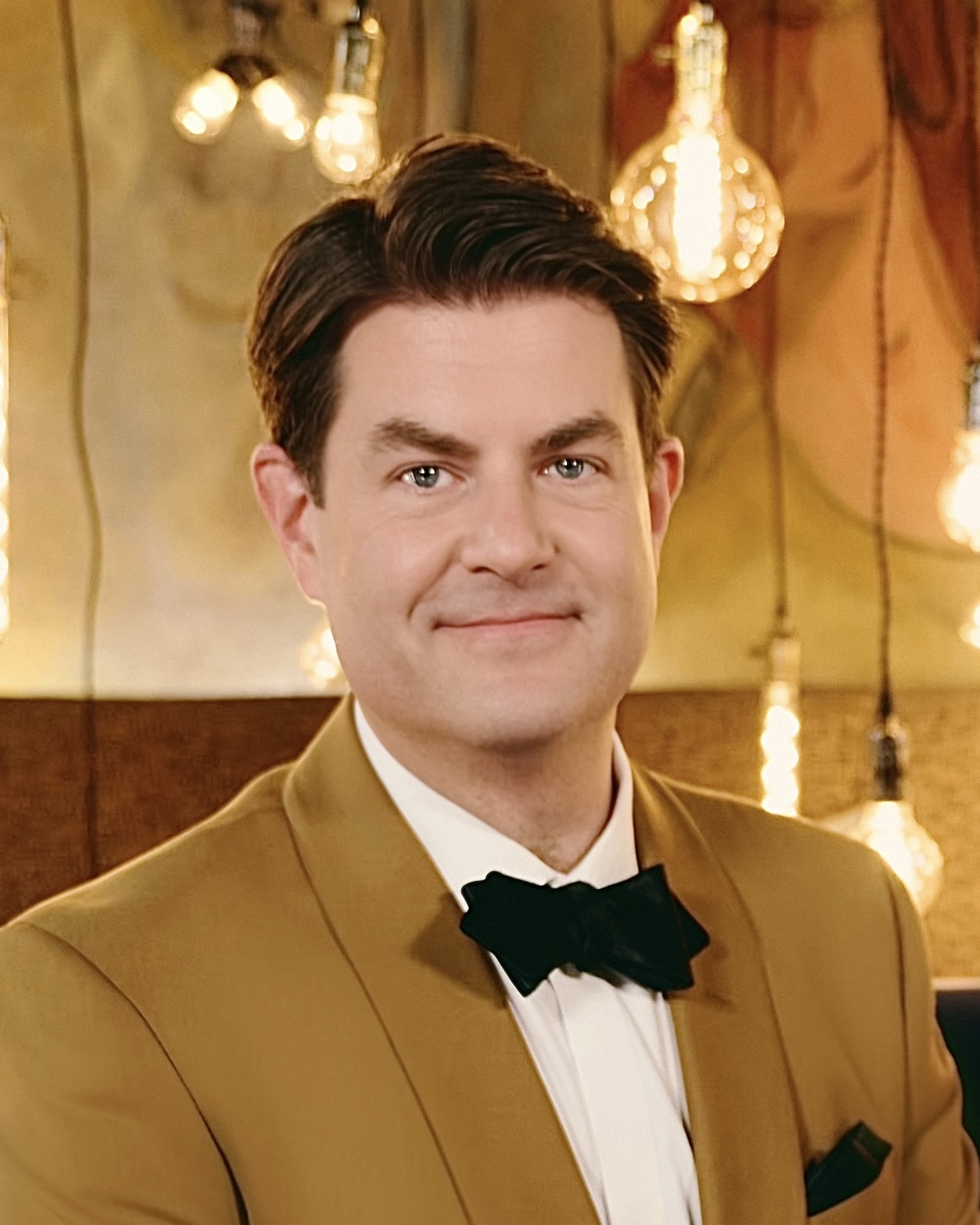
- Wontorek at the 2024 Tony Awards after-party at Cafe Carlyle
- Born: May 29, 1972 (age 54); Maryville, Tennessee, U.S.
- Education: Fordham University
- Occupations: Editor-in-chief of Broadway.com, VP of Creative for John Gore Organization
- Known for: Celebrity journalism
- Notable work: Show People with Paul Wontorek, The Broadway Show with Tamsen Fadal, Take Me to the World: A Sondheim 90th Birthday Celebration
- Relatives: Thomas Wontorek (father); LaVonne Wontorek (mother); Marc Wontorek (brother)
- Website: www.broadway.com

Paul Wontorek (born May 29, 1972) is an American theater personality, journalist, influencer, host and editor-in-chief at Broadway.com.

== Early life and education ==
Wontorek was born in Maryville, Tennessee but moved to Connecticut as an infant. His father was involved in local government, serving as Town Manager in three cities during his childhood: Newington, Connecticut, North Branford, Connecticut and Farmington, Connecticut, where Wontorek attended public high school and became involved in theater. He worked backstage on school theatrical productions and also began writing about Broadway for his high school newspaper. At 18, he moved to New York City to attend school at The college at Lincoln Center of Fordham University as a Media Studies/Journalism major and wrote for the school's newspaper, The Fordham Observer and was an unpaid intern at prominent media companies including Interview Magazine.

== Career ==
Wontorek started writing about the theater scene professionally while attending college. A college internship at TheaterWeek magazine starting in 1991 offered him the chance to conduct some of his first star interviews with personalities like Debbie Gibson, Kathleen Turner, Gregory Hines and Betty Buckley. At the same time, he worked at the off-Broadway Duo Theater in a variety of capacities. For the long-running musical Born to Rumba! and the progressive queer ballroom musical The Ball, he served as stage manager, light and sound operator and advertising and CD designer.

After graduating from Fordham, Wontorek supported himself as a graphic design manager in the advertising world while doing freelance writing about Broadway for InTheater Magazine, Entertainment Weekly and his own theater magazine, Upstage, for which he served as publisher, editor and designer.

Wontorek was hired on February 14, 2000, as founding editor-in-chief of Broadway.com, owned by Hollywood Media Corporation. He has served in that role ever since, leading a team of content creators. In 2010, Broadway.com was bought by Key Brand Entertainment (now John Gore Organization) from Hollywood Media Corp for approximately $45 million.

In 2010, Wontorek started performing on-camera hosting for Broadway.com, launching the weekly talk show Show People with Paul Wontorek. The popular series ran for a total of 255 episodes over a decade, and featured many top Broadway and Hollywood stars including Angela Bassett, Ben Platt, Matt Bomer, Kristin Chenoweth, Bryan Cranston, Darren Criss, Ariana DeBose, Cynthia Erivo, Sutton Foster, Andrew Garfield, Jonathan Groff, Joshua Jackson, Jane Krakowski, Nathan Lane, Judith Light, Patti LuPone, Audra McDonald, Idina Menzel, Lin-Manuel Miranda, Sarah Paulson and Aaron Tveit.

He has also appeared as a host on Broadway.com series including The Broadway.com Show, Broadway.com #LiveatFive and Front Row.

In 2019, Wontorek made his broadcast television debut with appearances on the syndicated entertainment program Broadway Profiles with Tamsen Fadal, which was renamed The Broadway Show with Tamsen Fadal in 2021. He currently serves as Chief Correspondent and producer of the nationally syndicated program.

Wontorek made his Broadway debut in The Prom, opening the May 14, 2019 performance. He replaced the Broadway red carpet reporter character Olivia Keating, normally played by cast member Courtney Balan, interviewing Dee Dee Allen (Beth Leavel) at opening night of her musical Eleanor: The Eleanor Roosevelt Musical.

When the COVID pandemic shut down Broadway in 2020, Wontorek became known for directing a series of online benefits that helped bring the theater community together. Most known is Take Me to the World: A Sondheim 90th Birthday Celebration, which featured an all-star cast performing self-recorded Stephen Sondheim songs including "The Ladies Who Lunch" by Meryl Streep, Christine Baranski and Audra McDonald and won a Drama League Award. During this time, Wontorek also brought back The Rosie O'Donnell Show for an online benefit and directed play readings of Lips Together, Teeth Apart with Zachary Quinto, Jesse Tyler Ferguson, Ari Graynor and Celia Keenan-Bolger, Buyer and Cellar with Michael Urie and Beirut with Marisa Tomei and Oscar Isaac.

Wontorek has been nominated for 18 New York Emmy Awards as producer, director, writer and host and won two, as producer of Broadway Profiles with Tamsen Fadal in 2021 and as writer for the CBS Tony Awards special At the Tonys.

== Personal life ==
Wontorek is openly gay and dedicated to putting a spotlight on members of the LGBTQ+ community in his work as a journalist.

He has also publicly shared his journey with being hard of hearing, and a user of hearing aids. Wontorek is an advocate for promoting more accessibility in theater, and positive discussions of disability.
