= Jeremy James Kissner =

American actor

- Born: March 24, 1985 (age 41); Minneapolis, Minnesota, United States
- Occupation: Actor
- Years active: 1998-2007
- Notable work: Great Expectations; A Dog of Flanders
- Television: Flight 29 Down

Jeremy James Kissner (March 24, 1985) is an American actor.

Kissner's first film role was in 1998's remake of Great Expectations, playing the younger version of Ethan Hawke's character Finn.

After an appearance on the television series Melrose Place, he starred in the lead role of the 1999 remake of A Dog of Flanders.

Kissner subsequently appeared on several television series, including ER and Touched by an Angel, as well as in several independent films.

From 2005 to 2007, he appeared in the Discovery Kids series Flight 29 Down as Eric.

== Film and television ==
Film and Television Performances
Year	Title	Role	Notes
1998	Great Expectations	10-year-old Finn	
1998	Melrose Place	Young Peter	(Guest; 1 episode)
1999	A Dog of Flanders	Nello	
2000	Touched by an Angel	Davey Tucker	(Guest; 1 episode)
2001	A.I. Artificial Intelligence	Kid	
2003	For the People		(Guest; 1 episode)
2004	Funky Monkey (film)	Nathan	
2005	ER	Erik	(Guest; 1 episode)
2005 - 2007	Flight 29 Down	Eric	(Main; 30 episodes)
2007	Brotherhood of Blood	Derek	
