= Speed of Light (album) =

Studio album by Corbin Bleu
- Released: March 10, 2009
- Recorded: June–December 2008
- Genre: Pop; electronic; R&B
- Length: 44:26
- Label: Hollywood
- Producer: Eric Hudson; Brian Kennedy; MaddScientist

Corbin Bleu chronology
Another Side (2007)	Speed of Light (2009)

Singles from Speed of Light
- 1. "Moments That Matter" Released: November 7, 2008; 2. "Celebrate You" Released: May 19, 2009

Speed of Light is the second studio album of actor and pop singer Corbin Bleu. It was released on March 10, 2009, by Hollywood Records.

The album's first single is "Moments That Matter". In January 2009, Bleu performed the song at Kids' Inaugural Concert: We Are the Future.

== Album information ==
For the promotion of the album, Bleu guested in many shows, including the Today show. When asked about the album, Bleu stated:

"I got a chance to really be involved in the studio writing tracks and lyrics, everything. It's a lot more personal experience and the album itself is a combination of different sounds, electronic, R&B, pop and it's definitely something you can play loud in the club."

== Critical reception ==
Professional ratings
Review scores
Source	Rating
AllMusic	2.5/5 stars

AllMusic's Stephen Thomas Erlewine states that "Bleu winds up with an album that plays FutureSex/LoveSounds with the sex removed; he has the shimmering synths, the chilly sound, but he's still singing about puppy love, he's still a teen idol. The same can also be said of Speed of Light as a whole: so much of the album is draped in threads borrowed from Timberlake/Timbaland that it's easy to overlook the lingering elements of Radio Disney, even when the strongest reminder, "Moments That Matter," arrives at the beginning of the record."

== Singles ==
"Moments That Matter" is the first single of the album. It was released a teaser from the music video. The song has been featured in Bleu's movie Free Style. Its full video has already premiered in Bleu's MySpace page.

A video for the single, "Celebrate You" was released in January 2009. Bleu performed that song at Disneyland as part of the 25th anniversary of the Walt Disney World Christmas Day Parade. The song is the official song of the "Year of Celebration" at the Disneyland resort and the "What Will You Celebrate?" campaign at the Walt Disney World Resort.

== Track listing ==
No.	Title	Writer(s)	Producer(s)	Length
1.	"Speed of Light"	Brian Kennedy, Claude Kelly	Kennedy	4:18
2.	"Paralyzed"	Kennedy, Kelly	Kennedy	2:51
3.	"Moments That Matter"	Eric Hudson, Kelly, Corbin Bleu	Hudson	4:52
4.	"Fear of Flying"	Kennedy, Kelly	Kennedy	4:27
5.	"Champion"	Hudson, Kelly, Bleu	Hudson	3:42
6.	"Rock 2 It"	Kennedy, Mansa Wakili, Kelly	Kennedy	3:34
7.	"Whatever It Takes"	Hudson, Kelly	Hudson	4:03
8.	"Willing to Go"	Terry "Madd Scientist" Thomas, Theron M. Thomas, Timothy J. Thomas	Madd Scientist	3:38
9.	"My Everything"	Kennedy, Kelly	Kennedy	2:52
10.	"Angel Cry"	Hudson, Kelly	Hudson	3:31
11.	"Close"	Hudson, Kelly	Hudson	3:20
12.	"Celebrate You" (bonus track)	Robbie Nevil, Matthew Gerrard	Gerrard	3:10

== Personnel ==
Adapted credits from the Speed of Light liner notes.

- Chris Gehringer – mastering (Sterling Sound, New York)
- Jon Lind – A&R
- Kahran White – A&R, executive producer
- Elliot Lurie, Stan Rogow – executive producers, management
- Enny Joo – art direction and design
- Joseph Cultice – photography
- Penny Lovell – styling
- Angie Alvarado – groomer

== Release history ==
Region	Date
United States	March 10, 2009
Argentina	March 12, 2009
Hong Kong	March 16, 2009
Brazil	March 24, 2009
Germany	April 3, 2009
France	April 6, 2009
United Kingdom	April 16, 2009
Europe	April 16, 2009
Japan	June 12, 2009
