= Free Style (film) =

2008 film by William Dear

- Promotional poster
- Directed by: William Dear
- Written by: Jeffrey Nicholson; Josh Leibner
- Produced by: Christian Arnold-Beutel; David Reivers; Donald Paul Pemrick; Dean E. Fronk; Jim O'Grady; Rob Cowan; John F.S. Lang; Michael Emanuel
- Starring: Corbin Bleu; Madison Pettis; Sandra Echeverría; Jesse Moss; Matt Bellefleur; David Reivers; Penelope Ann Miller
- Cinematography: Barry Donlevy
- Edited by: Edgar Burcksen
- Music by: Stephen Endelman
- Production companies: Rigel Entertainment; Canal Street Films; Up North Entertainment
- Distributed by: Samuel Goldwyn Films
- Release dates: December 24, 2008 (Mexico); October 9, 2009 (Limited: United States)
- Running time: 94 minutes
- Country: United States
- Language: English
- Budget: $10 million
- Box office: $721,108

Free Style is a 2008 coming-of-age film about an 18-year-old young man (Corbin Bleu), who is devoted to his family, and finds love and himself in his quest to win the Amateur National Motocross Championship. The film was directed by William Dear (Angels in the Outfield, Harry and the Hendersons).

== Plot ==
Cale Bryant is a young man who delves deeper into his passion, debuting in the world of Motocross.

Now that he is an adult, he decides to choose his own future, for once, independently, to help him become a champion with the support of parents and his girlfriend.

After hard training, Cale decides to enroll in the National Championship for amateur motocross, convinced that he can win. In the last race, Cale is in the lead until the last lap where his bike breaks down. Cale beats his arch rival Derek Black by pushing his bike across the finish line but is disqualified for pushing his bike across the line. Derek celebrates his victory until it is revealed that Derek had been disqualified for causing a wreck and Cale will receive the pro contract for next season.

== Cast ==
- Corbin Bleu as Cale Bryant
- Madison Pettis as Bailey Bryant
- Sandra Echeverría as Alex Lopez
- Jesse Moss as Justin Maynard
- Matt Bellefleur as Derek Black
- David Reivers as Dell Bryant
- Penelope Ann Miller as Jeannette Bryant
- Martin Rattigan as Coby
- Kelly Small as Sam

== Critical reception ==
Free Style garnered negative reviews from critics. On the review aggregator Rotten Tomatoes, the film has an approval rating of 33%, based on 18 reviews, with an average rating of 4/10.

Mike Hale of The New York Times noted that the film initially sets itself up as being "jumpy, noisy, cheerful, a sort of "High School X-Games Musical." But said that despite the "shamelessly pandering finish", it comes across as a "surprisingly old-fashioned tale of small-town striving" with some "perfunctorily filmed" racing scenes. S. Jhoanna Robledo of Common Sense Media said that despite Bleu's efforts with the movie's "heavier themes" and having "poignant" scenes with Pettis, she felt the plot was "better suited for an after-school special than a big-screen treatment." Elizabeth Weitzman of the New York Daily News wrote that: "Though the film deserves credit for its depiction of economic hardship, almost everything else is handled clumsily. And why would a movie about motocross spend so little time on the track? Bleu remains one to watch, but only real fans will want to watch this."

Roger Ebert wrote that: "There are some charming actors in this movie, all dressed up but with no place to go. "Free Style" is remorselessly formulaic, with every character and plot point playing its assigned role." Scott Tobias of The A.V. Club gave the movie a "D" grade, criticizing Dear's filmmaking style, saying "his signature bland semi-competence is all over Free Style, which desperately needs some flash of style and forward momentum." Entertainment Weekly writer Adam Markovitz gave the film a "D+" grade, criticizing Bleu's performance for being "bland and painfully earnest" and felt the formulaic plot "unfolds just the way you think it will…until the climax turns out to be even cheesier than you feared."
