= Lauren Storm =

American actress and acting coach (born 1987)

- Born: Lauren Marlene Storm; January 2, 1987 (age 39); Chicago, Illinois, U.S.
- Occupation: Actress
- Years active: 2001–present
- Height: 5 ft 3 in (1.60 m)

Lauren Marlene Storm (born January 2, 1987) is an American actress and acting coach. She is perhaps best known for her role as Taylor Hagan in the television series Flight 29 Down and as Teresa Kilmer in the 2009 film I Love You, Beth Cooper.

== Early life ==
Storm was born in Chicago, Illinois, near a village located in Cook County. Her father, Dave, is a dentist, and her mother, Barb, a magazine editor. Storm's father is of German background and her mother is Jewish, and Storm was raised in the Jewish religion. Storm started modeling at the age of nine. She graduated from Barbizon Modeling and Acting School of Chicago and at age twelve, she participated in a talent competition, which was held in New York City for aspiring models and actors. She received responses from several theatrical agencies and was asked to relocate to Los Angeles for a pilot season. She stayed in the city for six months and got her first major acting job, a number of other roles followed afterwards and she stayed permanently, eventually residing in Burbank, California.

== Career ==
Storm made her major acting debut in a two episode stint on the television drama, Boston Public. Her other television credits include, Malcolm in the Middle, 24, Joan of Arcadia, CSI: Miami, Still Standing, 7th Heaven and Drop Dead Diva.

From 2005 to 2007, she co-starred in Discovery Kids serial drama, Flight 29 Down as Taylor Hagan.

She also co-starred in the films The Game Plan, Mrs. Harris, I Love You, Beth Cooper opposite Hayden Panettiere and the Thomas Dekker-directed film, Whore opposite Megan Fox.

== Other interests ==
Storm has done charity work throughout the years. She has supported Kids with a Cause, the Olive Crest Foundation, the Jonathan Jaques Cancer Walk, Ronald McDonald House Charities, The LA Mission, Project Angelfood, Make a Wish Foundation and St. Jude Children's Hospital.

Storm currently serves as a StarPower Ambassador for the Starlight Children's Foundation, encouraging other young people to commit their time to help other children and working with Starlight to brighten the lives of seriously ill children.

== Filmography ==
=== Film ===
Year	Title	Role	Notes
2004	Game Box 1.0	Waitress Pamela	
2007	The Game Plan	Nanny Cindy	
2007	Resurrection Mary	Erica	
2008	Together Again for the First Time	Chinelle Frobisher	Video
2008	Whore	Lauren	
2009	I Love You, Beth Cooper	Teresa 'Treece' Kilmer	
2009	The Jerk Theory	Amy	
2009	The Inner Circle	Rachel Dugan	
2011	The Roommate	Maria's Girlfriend	
2011	Munger Road	Rachael Donahue	
2014	My Eleventh		
2015	Last Word	Karen	Short
2021	The Legend of Resurrection Mary	Erica	

=== Television ===
Year	Title	Role	Notes
2001	Boston Public	Donna Stuart	"Chapter 18", "Chapter 21"
2002	What Leonard Comes Home To	Erin Huff	TV film
2002	Malcolm in the Middle	Laurie	"Company Picnic: Parts 1 & 2"
2003	The Ripples	Lexi	TV film
2003	24	Jenna	"Day 3: 1:00 p.m.-2:00 p.m.", "Day 3: 2:00 p.m.-3:00 p.m."
2004	Fillmore!	Gladys / Alexis Bixbee (voice)	"Code Name: Electric Haircut"
2004	Joan of Arcadia	Lori	"No Bad Guy"
2004	CSI: Miami	Cameron	"Lost Son"
2004	7th Heaven	Christina Davies	"Why Not Me?"
2004–2006	Still Standing	Kaitlin	"Still Shallow", "Still Saying I Love You"
2005	Mrs. Harris	Favorite Madeira Student	TV film
2005–2007	Flight 29 Down	Taylor Hagan	Main role
2007	Flight 29 Down: The Hotel Tango	Taylor	TV film
2007	Judy's Got a Gun	Brooke	TV film
2009	Drop Dead Diva	Jenny Hanson	"The Dress"
2014	Correcting Christmas	Samantha	TV film
2017	Are You There God? It's Me Margot	Genna	TV series
