= Another Side (Corbin Bleu album) =

Studio album by Corbin Bleu
- Released: May 1, 2007
- Recorded: August 2006 – February 2007
- Genres: Pop; dance-pop; teen pop; R&B
- Length: 39:01
- Label: Hollywood
- Producers: Elliot Lurie (exec.); Stan Rogow (exec.); Cutfather; Matthew Gerrard; Christopher Rojas; Jonas Jeberg; Damon Sharpe; Stereo; Shaffer Smith; The Heavyweights

Corbin Bleu chronology
Another Side (2007)	Speed of Light (2009)

Singles from Another Side
- 1. "Push It to the Limit" Released: November 25, 2006; 2. "Deal with It" Released: May 12, 2007

Another Side is the debut studio album by American singer Corbin Bleu. It was released by Hollywood Records on May 1, 2007. Bleu stated that the album has a "pop-R&B feel".

The album was preceded by the single "Push It to the Limit," which reached number 14 on the US Billboard Hot 100, while follow-up "Deal with It" peaked at number 87 on the Pop Songs chart. Bleu further supported Another Side by doing a solo summer tour with opening act Mitchel Musso, along with opening for Vanessa Hudgens' State & County Fair 2008 summer tour.

== Background ==
Bleu covered three songs for the album, "She Could Be" was originally sung by Christian Bautista and "Still There for Me" was originally sung by Nick Carter under the title "There for Me". The song "Deal with It" was originally written and sung by Jay Sean, who originally intended it to be the title single of his second album My Own Way (2008). He later gave it to Corbin Bleu, whose version of the song features background vocals by Jay Sean. The song earned Jay Sean a BMI Songwriter Award. Korean record label SM Entertainment purchased the rights for the song, which would later appear on boy band SHINee's Romeo EP, as "Juliette".

== Critical reception ==
Professional ratings
Review scores
Source	Rating
AllMusic	2.5/5 stars
USA Today	2.5/4 stars

AllMusic editor Marisa Brown concluded that with the album, Bleu was "trying to appeal to a sense of fun, to singing along in the car with your friends (as your mom drives), but it's so generic and produced it doesn't even do that. And with that one objective failed, Another Side loses its own purpose completely."

== Chart performance ==
The album debuted and peaked at number thirty-six on the US Billboard 200, selling about 18,000 copies in its first week.

== Track listing ==
Another Side – Standard edition
No.	Title	Writer(s)	Producer(s)	Length
1.	"Deal with It"	Jay Sean, Mikkel Johan Imer Sigvardt, Joe Belmatti, Mich Hansen	Cutfather	3:04
2.	"Stop" (featuring J-King)	Lambert Waldrip, Drew Jordan	Stereo	3:24
3.	"Roll with You"	David Kopatz, Mich Hansen, Joe Belmaati	Cutfather	2:59
4.	"She Could Be"	Andrew Fromm, Christopher Rojas, Arnie Roman	Christopher Rojas	3:25
5.	"I Get Lonely"	Shaffer Smith, Melvin Sparkman, Marcus Allen	The Heavy Weights	3:35
6.	"We Come to Party"	Matthew Gerrard, Robbie Nevil, Corbin Bleu	Matthew Gerrard	3:04
7.	"Mixed Up"	Corbin Bleu, Damon Sharpe, Greg Lawson, Brian Wayy	Damon Sharpe	2:54
8.	"Still There for Me (featuring Vanessa Hudgens)"	Bridget Benenate, Matthew Gerrard	Matthew Gerrard	3:38
9.	"Marchin'"	Damon Sharpe, Greg Lawson, Jonas Jeberg, Simon Brenting	Damon Sharpe, Jonas Jeberg	3:02
10.	"Never Met a Girl like You"	Matthew Gerrard, Robbie Nevil, Corbin Bleu	Matthew Gerrard	3:40
11.	"Homework" (featuring J-King)	Steven Durham, Dalevertis Hurd, Corbin Bleu, Jaime King, Jr	Steven Durham, Dalevertis Hurd	2:58
12.	"Push It to the Limit"	Matthew Gerrard, Robbie Nevil	Matthew Gerrard	3:14

Another Side – European edition (bonus track)
No.	Title	Length
13.	"Shake It Off"	4:06

Another Side – Japanese edition (bonus track)
No.	Title	Length
14.	"Push It to the Limit" (Paul Robb remix)

== Charts ==
Weekly chart performance for Another Side
Chart (2007)	Peak position
US Billboard 200	36

== Release history ==
Release history and formats for Another Side
Region	Date	Label
United States	May 1, 2007	Hollywood Records
United Kingdom	June 11, 2007	Hollywood Records
France	June 18, 2007	Hollywood Records
Australia	August 11, 2007	Hollywood Records
