= Push It to the Limit (Corbin Bleu song) =

Single by Corbin Bleu

from the album Another Side and Jump In!
- Released: November 25, 2006 (US)
- Recorded: 2006
- Genre: Music
- Length: 3:14
- Label: Hollywood
- Songwriters: Matthew Gerrard, Robbie Nevil
- Producers: Matthew Gerrard, Robbie Nevil

Corbin Bleu singles chronology
"Push It to the Limit" (2006)	"Deal with It" (2007)

Music video
- "Push It to the Limit" on YouTube

"Push It to the Limit" song by Corbin Bleu featured in the Disney Channel Original Movie Jump In!

== Background ==
"Push It to the Limit" was released on Disney Channel on Thanksgiving Day 2006 and subsequently on Radio Disney the following Saturday. According to a press release from Walt Disney Records, the single, along with the other songs on the Jump In! soundtrack, were part of a new music genre dubbed "pop-hop" for its blend of pop and hip-hop music styles. The lead track from the Jump In! album, "Push It to the Limit," was also featured on Bleu's debut album, Another Side, released by Hollywood Records on April 17, 2007.

Bleu described the sound of his music with Disney as a mix of R&B and pop, drawing comparisons to popular youth-oriented pop rap acts, saying it was "kind of R&B mixed with pop," and "very similar to Justin Timberlake style with an Usher or Chris Brown type of thing going on as well."

== Music video ==
The music video shows Bleu and four other teenage boys dancing in a high school gym. It also shows Bleu with his afro pulled back in a ponytail on bleachers with a group of teenage girls; clips from the movie, Jump In! are intercut these scenes as well. After its release, the video played on the Disney Channel frequently. A dance to the limit, or dance-along version was shown in portions during a Jump In! airing on March 16, 2007.

The video also features Johnny "J Blaze" Erasme from the JammXKids as one of the dancers.

There is also a version without the scenes from Jump In!, with the dance scenes extended. Because the film scenes are cut from this version, some dance scenes have to be moved up from their regular position in the version with the Jump In! scenes. Thus some dances are repeated and new ones are added.

== Reception ==
The song received positive reviews from critics. The Knoxville News Sentinel described the song as a methodical appeal to its targeted audience. The review noted that the track had enough edge to engage not only younger listeners but also parents and older siblings. It highlighted the combination of hip-hop and electronic dance music, along with repetitive choruses, as key elements contributing to its success. Bleu's confident performance was specifically commended.

The Los Angeles Times included Bleu in its list of "Faces to Watch" in 2007, remarking on Disney's new brand of teen-pop. They described "Push It to the Limit" as a wholesome, natural, R&B-flavored response to the synthetic pop era of Britney Spears and the Backstreet Boys.

== Chart performance ==
In late January 2007, the song debuted on the Billboard Hot 100 at number 14 and on the Hot Digital Songs chart at number 5, with 77,000 downloads. It peaked at number 87 on the UK Singles Chart, staying on the Top 200 chart for eight weeks.

=== Charts ===
Chart (2006)	Peak position
U.S. Billboard Hot 100	14
U.S. Billboard Pop 100	17
U.S. Billboard Hot Digital Songs	5
UK Singles Chart	87

== Certifications ==
Region	Certification	Certified units/sales
United States (RIAA)	Gold	500,000^{‡}
^{‡} Sales+streaming figures based on certification alone.
