= List of programs broadcast by Disney Channel (South Korea) =

This is a list of television programs currently broadcast (in first-run or reruns), scheduled to be broadcast or formerly broadcast on Disney Channel, while the show was defunct on September 30, 2021. The channel was owned by Disney Channels Korea Ltd., a joint venture between The Walt Disney Company (Korea) LLC, and the Disney Branded Television unit of Disney International Operations.

== Former programming ==
=== Original series ===
==== Animated series ====
- Elena of Avalor (아발로 왕국의 엘레나) (March 6, 2017 – December 11, 2020, first-run; September 27, 2021 – September 30, 2021, reruns)
- Milo Murphy's Law (마일로 머피의 법칙) (April 1, 2017 – September 30, 2021)
- Marvel's Spider-Man (스파이더 맨) (May 20, 2018 – January 23, 2021, first-run; September 6, 2021 – September 30, 2021, reruns)
- Big City Greens (빅 시티 그린) (November 14, 2018 – September 30, 2021)
- Marvel Future Avengers (마블 퓨처 어벤져스) (April 20, 2019 – July 26, 2020, first-run; September 6, 2021 – September 30, 2021, reruns)
- Amphibia (신비한 개구리 나라 앰피비아) (September 18, 2019 – September 30, 2021)
- The Owl House (아울 하우스) (May 23, 2020 – September 30, 2021)
- Phineas and Ferb (피니와 퍼브) (July 1, 2011 – December 8, 2016, first-run; March 8, 2021 – April 16, 2021, reruns)
- Mickey Mouse and Friends (미키마우스와 친구들)
- Lilo & Stitch: The Series (릴로와 스티치) (June 4, 2012 – July 16, 2012, first-run; January 17, 2016 – January 24, 2016, reruns)
- Ultimate Spider-Man (얼티밋 스파이더 맨) (July 7, 2012 – June 24, 2018)
- Gravity Falls (괴짜가족 괴담일기) (August 2, 2013 – February 24, 2017, first-run; July 5, 2021 – September 2, 2021, reruns)
- DuckTales (오리 아저씨) (December 16, 2013 – February 28, 2014, first-run; December 1, 2015 – December 18, 2015, reruns)
- Wander Over Yonder (완다가 간다) (January 8, 2014 – September 21, 2016)
- Lego Star Wars: The New Yoda Chronicles (스타워즈: 새로운 요다 연대기) (May 4, 2014 – December 28, 2014, first-run; October 27, 2015 – October 29, 2015, reruns)
- Liarla Pardo (리아를라 파르도) (April 15, 2018 – August 1, 2021, reruns)
- The 7D (하이호! 일곱 난쟁이) (October 20, 2014 – February 23, 2017, first-run; May 6, 2021 – August 1, 2021, reruns)
- Randy Cunningham: 9th Grade Ninja (닌자보이 랜디) (November 3, 2014 – July 29, 2017)
- Star Wars Rebels (스타워즈 반란군) (November 7, 2014 – June 15, 2018, first-run; August 22, 2021 – August 27, 2021, reruns)
- Penn Zero: Part-Time Hero (펜 제로: 파트타임 히어로) (season 1; June 9, 2015 – July 21, 2017)
- Star vs. the Forces of Evil (프린세스 스타의 모험 일기) (June 15, 2015 – December 2, 2019, first-run; July 5, 2021 – July 30, 2021, reruns)
- Lego Star Wars: Droid Tales (스타워즈: 드로이드의 전설) (August 14, 2015 – November 6, 2015, first-run; May 4, 2016, reruns)
- Bubble Cook Expedition (보글 쿡 원정대) (August 18, 2015 – September 21, 2015, first-run; August 1, 2021 – August 28, 2021, reruns)
- Stitch! (스티치! 새로운 모험) (September 20, 2015 – October 30, 2015, reruns)
- Paper Town (알록달록 종이마을) (October 19, 2015 – October 30, 2015, first-run; August 15, 2021 – August 28, 2021, reruns)
- Have a Laugh! (미키와 함께 웃어요) (October 26, 2015 – November 5, 2015, reruns)
- Kim Possible (킴 파서블) (November 21, 2015 – November 29, 2015)
- Kick Buttowski: Suburban Daredevil (스턴트 악동 킥 버토우스키) (December 1, 2015 – December 31, 2015, reruns)
- Fish Hooks (어항 속의 하이틴) (February 5, 2016 – February 27, 2016, reruns)
- Lego Star Wars: The Yoda Chronicles (스타워즈: 요다의 비밀 이야기) (February 21, 2016, reruns)
- Lego Star Wars: The Freemaker Adventures (스타워즈: 프리메이커의 모험) (September 17, 2016 – January 14, 2018)
- Lego Star Wars: The Resistance Rises (스타워즈: 저항의 시작) (September 17, 2016)
- Guardians of the Galaxy (가디언즈 오브 갤럭시) (April 24, 2017 – September 25, 2021)
- Pickle and Peanut (오이지와 땅콩) (season 1; July 20, 2017 – August 24, 2017, first-run; September 2, 2017 – November 2, 2017, reruns)
- Rapunzel's Tangled Adventure (라푼젤의 모험) (October 13, 2017 – June 20, 2020, first-run; July 26, 2021 – September 3, 2021, reruns)
- DuckTales (도날드 덕 가족의 모험) (January 20, 2018 – May 15, 2021, first-run; July 5, 2021 – July 30, 2021, reruns)
- Billy Dilley's Super-Duper Subterranean Summer (빌리의 지하 탐구 생활) (August 3, 2018 – September 14, 2018)
- Big Hero 6: The Series (빅 히어로 시리즈) (September 15, 2018 – May 5, 2021)
- Lego Star Wars: All-Stars (스타워즈: 올-스타즈) (May 4, 2019 – May 26, 2019)
- 101 Dalmatian Street (101 달마시안 스트리트) (July 22, 2019 – April 12, 2021)
- Star Wars Resistance (스타워즈 저항군) (season 1; January 5, 2020 – March 22, 2020)

==== Live-action series ====
- Bunk'd (키키와카 캠프) (March 29, 2017 – September 30, 2021)
- Raven's Home (레이븐의 집) (June 11, 2018 – September 30, 2021)
- Sydney to the Max (데칼코마니, 아빠와 나) (October 1, 2019 – September 30, 2021)
- Coop & Cami Ask the World (쿱&캐미TV) (November 16, 2019 – September 30, 2021)
- Gabby Duran & the Unsittables (개비의 외계인 육아 도전기) (February 18, 2021 – September 30, 2021)
- Secrets of Sulphur Springs (설퍼 스프링스의 비밀) (August 9, 2021 – September 30, 2021)
- Just Roll with It (라이브 시트콤: 당신의 선택!) (August 16, 2021 – September 30, 2021)
- Violetta (비올레타) (August 12, 2012 - March 25, 2015, first-run; December 17, 2017 - February 25, 2018, Season 1 reruns)
- Austin & Ally (오스틴 & 앨리) (September 2, 2012 – February 15, 2017)
- Singibanggi Show (신기방기 쇼) (September 25, 2013 – November 13, 2013, first-run; September 1, 2019, reruns)
- Jessie (제시) (June 16, 2014 – June 10, 2017, first-run; January 6, 2021 – March 24, 2021, reruns)
- Shake It Up (우리는 댄스소녀) (June 16, 2014 – May 17, 2017, first-run; September 4, 2017 – September 10, 2017, reruns)
- Liv and Maddie (리브 앤 매디) (September 14, 2014 – May 3, 2020, first-run; September 27, 2021, reruns)
- Girl Meets World (라일리의 세상) (March 15, 2015 – March 29, 2017)
- Evermoor (에버무어) (April 18, 2015 – May 3, 2015, first-run; February 20, 2016, reruns)
- The Mickey Mouse Club (미키마우스 클럽) (Korean version; July 23, 2015 – December 17, 2015, first-run; June 21, 2021 – June 22, 2021, reruns)
- Wizards of Waverly Place (우리 가족 마법사) (December 1, 2015 – May 19, 2020, first-run; September 30, 2020, reruns)
- Dog with a Blog (스탠의 블로그 일기) (January 18, 2016 – April 25, 2016, first-run; September 5, 2016 – October 21, 2016, reruns)
- Hannah Montana (한나 몬타나) (May 8, 2016 – February 27, 2017)
- The Suite Life of Zack & Cody (잭과 코디, 우리 집은 호텔 스위트 룸) (December 19, 2016 – January 31, 2017, reruns)
- Bizaardvark (핵꿀잼 비짤봙) (February 1, 2017 – September 8, 2019, first-run; September 20, 2021 – September 21, 2021, reruns)
- I Didn't Do It (내가 안 했다니까!) (March 1, 2017 – March 28, 2017)
- Good Luck Charlie (찰리야 부탁해) (March 4, 2017 – March 26, 2017, reruns)
- K.C. Undercover (KC 언더커버 하이스쿨 스파이) (June 12, 2017 – June 23, 2018, first-run; September 14, 2021 – September 18, 2021, reruns)
- Best Friends Whenever (언제나 베프) (July 31, 2017 – August 29, 2017)
- Wadda tv (왔다 tv) (August 26, 2017 – December 31, 2020, first-run; February 27, 2021 – August 12, 2021, reruns)
- Stuck in the Middle (중간딸은 힘들어) (September 11, 2017 – December 8, 2019, first-run; August 16, 2021 – August 30, 2021, reruns)
- Kirby Buckets (커비의 카툰일기) (seasons 1 – 2; September 20, 2017 – September 26, 2018)
- Lab Rats (실험실의 비밀친구) (December 18, 2017 – March 5, 2020, first-run; September 24, 2021, reruns)
- Walk the Prank (오늘도 몰래카메라) (January 15, 2018 – August 27, 2019)
- A.N.T. Farm (A.N.T. 영재 클럽) (February 12, 2018 – June 4, 2018, first-run; June 13, 2021 – July 26, 2021, reruns)
- Mech-X4 (메크-X4) (season 1; March 19, 2018 – March 28, 2018)
- Liquid Monster Melang (액체괴물 멜랑) (April 19, 2018, first-run; August 28, 2021, reruns)
- Avengers Assemble (어벤져스 어셈블) (seasons 3 – 5; April 21, 2018 – February 7, 2021)
- Crash & Bernstein (크래쉬와 번스틴) (July 9, 2018 – July 27, 2018)
- Mighty Med (응급 구조: 슈퍼 히어로를 구하라) (season 1; August 16, 2018 – August 31, 2018)
- Finding Mickey (미키를 찾아라) (November 3, 2018 – December 15, 2018, first-run; June 15, 2019 – July 6, 2019, reruns)
- Imagination Movers (상상 창고의 만능 해결사) (November 27, 2018 – January 4, 2019)
- Sonny with a Chance (유쾌한 써니) (January 29, 2019 – March 6, 2019)
- The Suite Life on Deck (잭과 코디, 우리 학교는 호화 유람선)
- Kickin' It (약골 탈피 하이킥) (March 25, 2019 – July 16, 2019)
- So Random! (유쾌한 써니: 예측 불허) (April 3, 2019 – April 19, 2019)
- Zeke and Luther (지크와 루터) (April 22, 2019 – September 11, 2019)
- Ddudda tv (떴다 tv) (May 25, 2019 – October 12, 2019)
- Simkungwang (심쿵왕) (June 6, 2019, first-run; August 17, 2019, reruns)
- Bia (맥주) (June 21, 2019 - August 5, 2021)
- Pair of Kings (쌍둥이 형제, 왕이 되다) (June 25, 2019 – September 24, 2019)
- Fast Layne (패스트 레인) (September 26, 2019 – September 30, 2019)
- I'm in the Band (라이프 오브 더 록 밴드) (October 14, 2019 – November 8, 2019)
- PrankStars (스타의 몰래 카메라) (November 13, 2019 – November 15, 2019)
- Aaron Stone (슈퍼히어로 애런 스톤) (November 22, 2019 – December 25, 2019)
- Bug Juice: My Adventures at Camp (버그 주스 캠프: 모험을 떠나요) (December 16, 2019 – January 7, 2020)
- Lab Rats: Elite Force (실험실의 비밀 친구:슈퍼히어로) (December 25, 2019 – January 4, 2020, first-run; June 24, 2021, reruns)
- Gamer's Guide to Pretty Much Everything (프로 게이머, 학교에 가다) (March 6, 2020 – March 26, 2020)
- The Lodge (틴 호텔리어) (March 27, 2020 – April 10, 2020)
- The Next Step (Canadian TV series)
- Win, Lose or Draw (도전! 게임 쇼 : 디즈니 스타와 함께) (April 10, 2020 – June 1, 2020, first-run; May 29, 2021 – May 30, 2021, reruns)
- Code: 9 (May 20, 2020 – May 23, 2020)
- Jonas (조나스 브라더스) (June 8, 2020 – August 21, 2020)
- Disney 11 (디즈니 일레븐) (October 19, 2020 – July 27, 2021, first-run; August 16, 2021 – September 16, 2021, reruns)
- Disney Fam Jam (패밀리 잼) (January 15, 2021 – January 24, 2021)
- Soy Luna (소이 루나 몰래카메라)

==== Short series ====
- Mickey Mouse (미키마우스) (November 2013 – September 30, 2021)
- Take Two with Phineas and Ferb (피니와 퍼브 퍼니쇼) (Korean version; May 10, 2013 – July 23, 2013, first-run; August 15, 2019, reruns)
- Singibanggi Show Season 2 (신기방기 쇼 2 못말리는 승부사들) (September 20, 2014 – January 21, 2015, first-run, September 19, 2021, reruns)
- Descendants: Wicked World (디센던츠: 악동들의 세상) (season 1; September 11, 2016 – September 25, 2016, first-run; October 2, 2016 – October 9, 2016, reruns)
- Majjang Matchup (맞짱 매치업) (November 21, 2019 – January 10, 2020, reruns)

=== Acquired series ===
- Patito Feo

==== Anime ====
- Lilpri
- Kirarin Revolution
- Kira Kira Happy Hirake! Cocotama (열려라 코코밍) (July 20, 2019 – May 16, 2020)
- Mermaid Melody Pichi Pichi Pitch (피치피치핏치)
- PriPara (프리파라) (February 11, 2016 – February 15, 2019, first-run; September 9, 2021 – September 13, 2021, reruns)
- Pokémon anime
- Pokémon (TV series)
- Pretty Rhythm: Rainbow Live
- Yo-kai Watch (요괴워치) (seasons 1 – 2; December 12, 2016 – October 12, 2017, first-run; February 23, 2020 – July 22, 2020, reruns)
- Jewelpet: Magical Change
- Ojamajo Doremi
- Zoobles! (TV series)

==== Animated series ====
- Miraculous: Tales of Ladybug & Cat Noir (미라큘러스: 레이디버그와 블랙캣) (December 7, 2015 – September 30, 2021)
- PJ Masks (출동! 파자마 삼총사) (April 6, 2016 – September 30, 2021) (Note: This series airs and/or has aired as part of Disney Junior, but is not an original series.)
- The Octonauts (바다 탐험대 옥토넛) (April 3, 2017 – September 30, 2021)
- Hotel Transylvania: The Series (몬스터 호텔 시리즈) (December 21, 2017 – September 30, 2021)
- Idol Time PriPara (아이돌 타임 프리파라) (February 22, 2019 – August 28, 2020, first-run; August 2, 2021 – September 30, 2021)
- Gigantosaurus (기간토사우루스) (June 17, 2019 – September 30, 2021)
- Catch! Teenieping (캐치! 티니핑) (April 17, 2020 – April 8, 2021, first-run; present, reruns)
- Rolling Stars (롤링스타즈) (September 15, 2020 – September 27, 2020, first-run; September 20, 2021 – present, reruns)
- Time Traveler Luke (시간여행자 루크) (October 8, 2020 – August 20, 2021, first-run; present, reruns)
- Galaxy Guards (우당탕탕 은하안전단) (May 7, 2021 – July 30, 2021, first-run; August 2, 2021 – present, reruns)
- Shaun the Sheep (못말리는 어린양 숀) (2011 – March 10, 2019, first-run; May 22, 2019 – May 30, 2020, reruns)
- A Kind of Magic (떴다! 마법가족) (June 3, 2012 – July 29, 2012)
- Mirmo Zibang! (미르모 퐁퐁퐁) (July 16, 2012 – August 1, 2012, first-run; December 6, 2014 – February 18, 2015, reruns)
- Pororo the Little Penguin (뽀롱뽀롱 뽀로로) (November 7, 2012 – December 11, 2016, first-run; August 29, 2020, reruns)
- Wild About Safety (티몬과 품바의 Safety Smart) (November 14, 2012 – February 2, 2020)
- Dude, That's My Ghost! (유령, 빌리!) (June 10, 2013 – February 1, 2014, first-run; January 2, 2017 – January 31, 2017, reruns)
- Kaibutsu-kun (몬스터왕자 몽짱) (July 22, 2013 – October 24, 2013, first-run; October 5, 2015 – October 23, 2015, reruns)
- Zig & Sharko (오! 마리나) (August 31, 2013 – December 1, 2017)
- Camp Lakebottom (오싹 비명 캠프) (December 30, 2013 – April 8, 2016)
- I'm Mongni (아이엠 몽니) (January 6, 2014 – July 18, 2014, first-run; September 4, 2021 – September 15, 2021, reruns)
- Noddy in Toyland (장난감 나라의 노디) (February 9, 2014 – February 25, 2015, first-run; October 5, 2015 – October 23, 2015, reruns)
- Gokujō!! Mecha Mote Iinchō (완소! 퍼펙트 반장) (June 14, 2014 – September 7, 2014, reruns)
- Line Town (라인 타운) (June 16, 2014 – September 5, 2014)
- Duda & Dada (두다다쿵) (July 2, 2014 – July 18, 2014, first-run; April 13, 2017, reruns)
- Numb Chucks (딜펑 브라더스) (July 26, 2014 – January 21, 2015, first-run; June 4, 2018 – June 17, 2018, reruns)
- Zack & Quack (잭과 팡) (September 1, 2014 – September 22, 2014, first-run; April 23, 2019 – April 24, 2019, reruns)
- Gokujō!! Mecha Mote Iinchō Second Collection (미라클 체인지 퍼펙트 반장) (September 7, 2014 – November 30, 2014, reruns)
- Tayo the Little Bus (꼬마버스 타요) (September 17, 2014 – February 17, 2017, first-run; September 5, 2019, reruns)
- Peg + Cat (페기+캣의 숫자놀이) (November 3, 2014 – December 13, 2018, first-run; March 16, 2020 – April 3, 2020, reruns)
- George of the Jungle (정글 대장 조지) (November 3, 2014 – November 27, 2014, first-run; November 22, 2015 – November 24, 2015, reruns)
- Alien Monkeys (에일리언 몽키스) (November 24, 2014 – April 17, 2015, first-run; April 12, 2018 – April 13, 2018, reruns)
- Ben & Holly's Little Kingdom (벤과 홀리의 리틀킹덤) (December 5, 2014 – December 22, 2014, first-run; September 30, 2019 – December 13, 2019, reruns)
- Bellbug Popo (아기종벌레 포포) (January 12, 2015 – January 29, 2015, first-run; November 21, 2020, reruns)
- Grami's Circus Show (그라미의 서커스 쇼) (January 14, 2015 – February 12, 2015, first-run; February 7, 2018 – February 10, 2018, reruns)
- Kongsuni and Friends (우당탕탕 콩순이와 친구들) (seasons 1 – 2, 6; February 28, 2015 – December 20, 2020)
- Legends of Chima (레고 키마의 전설) (February 23, 2015 – March 18, 2015)
- The Smurfs (개구쟁이 스머프) (February 23, 2015 – January 29, 2016, first-run; March 23, 2018 – April 13, 2018, reruns)
- Buru & Forest Friends (부루와 숲속 친구들) (March 17, 2015 – March 18, 2015, reruns)
- Rocket Monkeys (로켓 몽키스) (April 8, 2015 – July 1, 2015, first-run; September 30, 2016 – November 4, 2016, reruns)
- Dooly the Little Dinosaur (아기공룡 둘리) (May 11, 2015 – June 22, 2015, first-run; July 17, 2018 – July 18, 2018, reruns)
- Space Jungle (스페이스 정글) (June 1, 2015 – April 4, 2017, first-run; December 1, 2017, reruns)
- Zip Zip (지퍼 펫) (June 23, 2015 – March 11, 2016, first-run; March 25, 2020 – March 27, 2020, reruns)
- Muffy and Jemjem (먹티와 잼잼) (July 22, 2015 – August 16, 2015, first-run; June 1, 2021 – August 24, 2021, reruns)
- Wasimo (할매로봇 오말자) (August 24, 2015 – February 3, 2016, first-run; November 7, 2016 – December 9, 2016, reruns)
- The Koala Brothers (도와줘요! 코알라 형제) (August 31, 2015 – October 28, 2015, first-run; July 11, 2018 – July 20, 2018, reruns)
- Dobi Dobi Mansion (도비도비) (September 22, 2015 – October 4, 2015, first-run; September 5, 2021 – September 16, 2021, reruns)
- The Adventures of Pim & Pom (핌과 폼의 모험) (September 23, 2015 – October 29, 2015)
- The Hive (하이브마을의 꿀벌 가족) (October 5, 2015 – December 23, 2015)
- Olivia (올리비아) (October 5, 2015 – October 30, 2015, reruns)
- Peanuts (스누피와 피너츠) (October 5, 2015 – December 9, 2016)
- The Cat in the Hat Knows a Lot About That! (모자 쓴 고양이) (November 2, 2015 – November 27, 2015)
- Pocoyo (렛츠고 포코요) (November 5, 2015 – November 27, 2015, first-run; December 1, 2015 – December 4, 2015, reruns)
- Black Rubber Shoes (검정 고무신) (season 4; November 9, 2015 – November 30, 2015, first-run; August 6, 2018 – November 6, 2018, reruns)
- Art Odyssey (미술탐험대) (November 19, 2015 – March 2, 2016, first-run; September 14, 2021 – September 24, 2021, reruns)
- Hi Totobi (안녕 토토비) (November 21, 2015 – March 25, 2017, first-run; August 9, 2021 – August 23, 2021, reruns)
- Super Hams Band (슈퍼햄스밴드) (November 29, 2015 – April 1, 2016, first-run; June 4, 2021 – June 16, 2021, reruns)
- Chloe's Closet (클로이의 요술옷장) (December 1, 2015 – February 29, 2016, reruns)
- Larva and Friends in My Arms (내품에 라바와 친구들) (December 7, 2015 – March 20, 2016, first-run; September 6, 2018 – September 7, 2018, reruns)
- Super Hams Band 2 (햄콩이 음악대) (December 22, 2015 – April 2, 2016, first-run; July 4, 2021 – July 25, 2021, reruns)
- Kids CSI (키즈 CSI 과학수사대) (December 24, 2015 – May 8, 2016, first-run; September 6, 2021, reruns)
- Mouk (무크) (January 4, 2016 – January 29, 2016, first-run; December 16, 2019 – December 20, 2019, reruns)
- Eori Story (어리이야기) (January 25, 2016 – March 28, 2016, first-run; July 23, 2018 – July 26, 2018, reruns)
- We Are Detectives (우리는 명탐정) (January 27, 2016 – May 9, 2016, first-run; May 14, 2018 – May 18, 2018, reruns)
- Lego City (레고 시티) (January 29, 2016 – January 31, 2016)
- King of Jungle, Saro (정글왕 사로) (February 21, 2016 – February 22, 2016, first-run, June 12, 2018 – June 13, 2018, reruns)
- Kim Possible
- Robot Train (로봇 트레인) (February 22, 2016 – March 14, 2016, first-run; January 1, 2021, reruns)
- Pretty Rhythm: Dear My Future (꿈의 보석 프리즘스톤) (February 24, 2016 – March 21, 2016, first-run; June 5, 2021 – June 18, 2021, reruns)
- Toad Patrol (두꺼비 순찰대) (March 15, 2016 – March 31, 2016, first-run; November 16, 2019, reruns)
- Spookiz (스푸키즈) (April 8, 2016 – April 22, 2016, first-run; August 29, 2021, reruns)
- Canimals (캐니멀) (April 21, 2016 – June 24, 2016, first-run; October 16, 2018 – January 21, 2019, reruns)
- The Quarreling Wonderland (아웅다웅 동화나라) (April 25, 2016 – August 28, 2016, first-run; December 1, 2018 – December 4, 2018, reruns)
- Thomas & Friends (토마스와 친구들) (May 2, 2016 – December 9, 2016, first-run; May 7, 2019 – May 31, 2019, reruns)
- Hello Jadoo (안녕 자두야) (seasons 1 – 2; May 11, 2016 – August 14, 2018)
- Galaxy Kids (갤럭시 키즈) (May 12, 2016 – May 24, 2017, first-run; May 10, 2019 – May 11, 2019, reruns)
- Fairytale Science Expedition (동화 속 과학탐험) (May 24, 2016 – May 25, 2016, first-run; January 2, 2019 – January 4, 2019, reruns)
- Magic Scientists Club (과학 마술단) (May 26, 2016 – May 27, 2016, first-run; September 3, 2021 – September 14, 2021, reruns)
- Mumu and Pupu (무무와 푸푸) (May 28, 2016 – May 29, 2016, first-run; December 12, 2018 – December 13, 2018, reruns)
- Eungkka Sonata (응까 소나타) (May 30, 2016 – May 31, 2016, first-run; January 4, 2019 – January 5, 2019, reruns)
- Full Moon Factory (보름달 공장) (June 11, 2016 – October 9, 2016, first-run; May 4, 2020 – May 14, 2020, reruns)
- Robocar Poli (로보카 폴리) (June 23, 2016 – May 31, 2019, first-run; July 5, 2021 – July 26, 2021, reruns)
- Super Wings (출동! 슈퍼윙스) (June 26, 2016 – November 13, 2020, first-run; July 10, 2021 – August 30, 2021, reruns)
- The Adventures of Baram (바람이의 모험) (June 28, 2016 – June 29, 2016, first-run; June 8, 2019 – June 9, 2019, reruns)
- Packages from Planet X (플래닛 X) (July 1, 2016 – September 23, 2016)
- Danger Mouse (데인저 마우스) (July 18, 2016 – October 13, 2016, first-run; August 22, 2018 – August 23, 2018, reruns)
- Bubble Bubble Cook (보글보글 쿡) (July 24, 2016 – September 28, 2016, first-run; April 16, 2019 – April 22, 2019, reruns)
- Little Groom Kung (꼬마신랑 쿵도령) (July 28, 2016 – July 31, 2016, first-run; March 14, 2019 – March 17, 2019, reruns)
- Kamisama Minarai: Himitsu no Cocotama (에그엔젤 코코밍) (August 1, 2016 – April 27, 2019, first-run; June 27, 2021 – June 29, 2021, reruns)
- Secret Jouju (치링치링 시크릿 쥬쥬) (seasons 7 – 9; September 5, 2016 – October 14, 2016, first-run; October 26, 2020 – November 17, 2020, reruns)
- Lego Nexo Knights (넥소나이츠) (season 2; September 11, 2016 – December 18, 2016)
- Brave Fire Engine Ray (용감한 소방차 레이) (September 22, 2016 – October 10, 2016, first-run; July 16, 2020, reruns)
- Cocomong (냉장고 나라 코코몽) (September 26, 2016 – April 22, 2017, first-run; April 13, 2020 – April 22, 2020, reruns)
- Tree Fu Tom (트리푸 톰) (October 24, 2016 – December 4, 2016)
- The Forks with Spiky Hands (뾰족뾰족 포크 가족) (October 24, 2016 – January 17, 2017, first-run; June 10, 2019 – June 11, 2019, reruns)
- Eggboy Koru (에그보이 코루) (October 30, 2016, first-run; April 26, 2019, reruns)
- SofyRuby (소피루비) (November 4, 2016 – October 20, 2017, first-run; February 12, 2020 – February 13, 2020, reruns)
- Cuby Zoo (주사위 요정 큐비쥬) (November 7, 2016 – June 20, 2017, first-run; July 23, 2021 – July 24, 2021, reruns)
- Hello Pawmily (안녕! 괴발개발) (November 7, 2016 – December 5, 2016, first-run; March 13, 2019, reruns)
- ModooModoo Show (모두모두쇼) (November 24, 2016 – April 29, 2017, first-run; September 4, 2020 – September 14, 2020, reruns)
- Jungle Survival (정글에서 살아남기) (November 28, 2016 – March 28, 2020, first-run; September 13, 2021 – September 19, 2021, reruns)
- T-Pang Rescue (뛰뛰빵빵 구조대) (November 30, 2016 – December 2, 2016, first-run; August 5, 2021 – August 25, 2021, reruns)
- Paw in Paw (동화나라 포인포) (December 5, 2016 – December 14, 2016, first-run; April 21, 2020, reruns)
- Atomic Puppet (합체 영웅 아토믹) (December 14, 2016 – January 25, 2017, first-run; January 26, 2017 – February 23, 2017, reruns)
- Barnacle Lou (따개비 루) (December 15, 2016 – January 2, 2017, first-run; April 20, 2020, reruns)
- Vroomiz (부릉! 부릉! 브루미즈) (January 2, 2017 – June 4, 2017, first-run; November 23, 2020, reruns)
- Monk (멍크) (January 3, 2017 – January 11, 2017, reruns)
- Flowering Heart (플라워링 하트) (January 7, 2017 – February 18, 2017, first-run; July 15, 2020, reruns)
- Fish & Chips (피쉬와 칩스) (February 11, 2017 – April 11, 2017, first-run; May 7, 2020 – May 20, 2020, reruns)
- Ninja Hattori (꾸러기 닌자 토리) (March 2, 2017 – April 28, 2017, reruns)
- Rolling with the Ronks! (원시소녀 밀라) (April 15, 2017 – May 20, 2017, first-run; December 25, 2018 – December 27, 2018, reruns)
- Rocket Boy (로켓보이) (May 1, 2017, reruns)
- Right Now Kapow (지금 바로 호이짜) (May 13, 2017 – October 29, 2017, first-run; December 21, 2018 – December 22, 2018, reruns)
- Molang (몰랑) (May 19, 2017 – July 14, 2017)
- Rilu Rilu Fairilu (숲의 요정 페어리루) (May 22, 2017 – May 18, 2019, first-run; August 2, 2021 – September 24, 2021, reruns)
- The Sound of Heart (마음의 소리) (season 1; June 21, 2017 – September 9, 2017)
- Atashin'chi (아따맘마) (July 10, 2017 – June 30, 2020)
- Naughty Nuts (너티너츠) (July 22, 2017 – October 13, 2017, first-run; August 29, 2021, reruns)
- Rainbow Ruby (레인보우 루비) (July 27, 2017 – January 18, 2021)
- Banzi's Secret Diary (반지의 비밀일기) (season 1; October 25, 2017 – May 11, 2018, first-run; September 5, 2020 – September 18, 2020, reruns)
- Sing with Pinkfong (핑크퐁과 노래해요) (November 13, 2017 – December 22, 2017)
- Lego Ninjago: Masters of Spinjitzu (닌자고) (November 28, 2017, reruns)
- GoGo Dino (고고 다이노) (December 21, 2017 – February 26, 2021)
- Star Wars: The Clone Wars (스타워즈: 클론 전쟁) (seasons 1 – 6; December 25, 2017 – January 20, 2019, first-run; September 22, 2021 – September 23, 2021, reruns)
- Calimero (칼리메로) (January 8, 2018 – August 13, 2018, first-run; September 23, 2019 – December 13, 2019, reruns)
- The Little Farmer Rabby (꼬마 농부 라비) (March 9, 2018 – August 31, 2018, first-run; January 19, 2021, reruns)
- Remi & Solla (레미솔라)
- Katuri (엄마 까투리) (April 16, 2018 – November 7, 2018)
- My Little Pony: Friendship Is Magic (마이 리틀 포니 우정은 마법) (seasons 1, 5 – 8; May 8, 2018 – July 25, 2020, first-run; July 13, 2021 – July 30, 2021, reruns)
- Oscar's Oasis (오스카의 오아시스) (May 10, 2018 – May 11, 2018, reruns)
- Larva (라바) (August 16, 2018 – August 17, 2018, reruns)
- Go Away, Unicorn! (사고뭉치 유니콘) (September 22, 2018 – March 31, 2021)
- Robot Train S2 (변신기차 로봇트레인) (October 1, 2018 – July 1, 2019, first-run; September 1, 2021, reruns)
- Badanamu Cadets (바다나무 카뎃) (December 3, 2018 – May 20, 2019, first-run; November 11, 2019 – November 29, 2019, reruns)
- Zombiedumb (좀비덤) (season 2; January 5, 2019 – February 2, 2019, first-run; October 26, 2020 – October 28, 2020, reruns)
- Bo&To's Family (보토스 패밀리) (January 19, 2019 – August 11, 2019)
- Super Z (꼬마히어로 슈퍼잭) (February 5, 2019 – April 11, 2021)
- Peppa Pig (꿀꿀! 페파는 즐거워) (seasons 1 – 3; February 11, 2019 – March 7, 2019)
- Teenie Scouts Big Five (쉿! 내 친구는 빅파이브) (October 19, 2019 – August 28, 2021)
- Sunny Bunnies (써니 버니) (November 25, 2019 – April 20, 2020, first-run; June 1, 2020 – July 3, 2020, reruns)
- Let's Go to School, Kong (콩이야 학교가자) (February 26, 2020 – February 27, 2020, first-run; June 19, 2021 – June 20, 2021, reruns)
- Pandarang (판다랑) (February 28, 2020 – February 29, 2020, first-run; June 10, 2021 – June 17, 2021, reruns)
- Jurassic Cops (쥬라기캅스) (March 29, 2020 – March 30, 2020, first-run; July 27, 2021 – July 29, 2021, reruns)
- Kiratto Pri Chan (반짝이는 프리채널) (April 3, 2020 – July 13, 2021)
- Hanging On! (놓지마 정신줄) (May 4, 2020 – November 28, 2020)
- Z Rangers (제트레인저) (May 13, 2020 – May 23, 2020, first-run; September 7, 2021 – September 17, 2021, reruns)
- Titipo Titipo (띠띠뽀 띠띠뽀) (season 2; June 6, 2020 – August 29, 2020, first-run; August 31, 2020 – September 16, 2020, reruns)
- Mofy (모피와 친구들) (July 1, 2020 – July 10, 2020)
- Journey of Long (롱롱 죽겠지) (July 31, 2020 – October 30, 2020, first-run; April 7, 2021 – June 4, 2021, reruns)
- Oops Ikooo (우당탕탕 아이쿠) (September 5, 2020 – September 14, 2020, first-run; September 10, 2021, reruns)
- Bloopies (블루피스) (November 24, 2020 – November 27, 2020, first-run; November 29, 2020 – December 13, 2020, reruns)
- Kongsuni Dancing Class (콩순이의 율동교실) (season 5; December 18, 2020 – June 25, 2021)
- Tish Tash (티시태시) (January 2, 2021 – March 27, 2021, first-run; May 3, 2021 – July 2, 2021, reruns)
- Secret Jouju: Guardians of Star (시크릿쥬쥬 별의 여신) (seasons 4 – 5; March 12, 2021 – June 28, 2021)
- Pretty Rhythm: Rainbow Live (꿈의 라이브 프리즘스톤) (July 1, 2021 – July 23, 2021, reruns)
- Franky & Friends (프랭키와 친구들) (July 9, 2021 – July 27, 2021, reruns)
- Winx Club

==== Live-action series ====
- Dream High (드림하이) (August 4, 2012 – September 22, 2012, first-run; October 8, 2012 – November 2, 2012, reruns)
- Just Kidding (It's 몰래카메라! 키즈) (season 1; January 5, 2013 – March 31, 2013)
- Dream High 2 (드림하이 2) (July 22, 2013 – September 16, 2013, first-run; May 9, 2014 – June 22, 2014, reruns)
- Just for Laughs Gags (It's 몰래카메라!) (May 5, 2014 – June 12, 2014, reruns)
- Hi! School: Love On (하이스쿨: 러브 온) (July 18, 2014 – December 26, 2014, first-run; July 6, 2015 – July 23, 2015, reruns)
- Disney English Reading Club (디즈니 잉글리시 리딩 클럽) (March 16, 2015, reruns)

=== Disney Junior series ===
A list of programs formerly broadcast on the Disney Junior programming block of Disney Channel.

- Doc McStuffins (꼬마의사 맥스터핀스) (September 3, 2012 – September 30, 2021)
- Sofia the First (리틀 프린세스 소피아) (July 26, 2013 – September 30, 2021)
- The Lion Guard (라이온 수호대) (May 7, 2016 – September 30, 2021)
- Play-Doh on Disney Junior (말랑말랑 도우랑) (April 24, 2017 – September 30, 2021)
- Mickey Mouse Mixed-Up Adventures (미키마우스 뒤죽박죽 모험) (July 15, 2017 – September 30, 2021)
- Puppy Dog Pals (퍼피독 친구들) (November 17, 2017 – September 30, 2021)
- Vampirina (리나는 뱀파이어) (April 16, 2018 – September 30, 2021)
- Muppet Babies (머펫 프렌즈) (November 12, 2018 – September 30, 2021)
- Fancy Nancy (멋쟁이 낸시 클랜시) (March 7, 2019 – September 30, 2021)
- T.O.T.S. (아기를 부탁해 토츠) (January 11, 2020 –September 30, 2021)
- The Rocketeer (꼬마 로켓티어) (October 15, 2020 – September 30, 2021)
- Mira, Royal Detective (왕실탐정, 미라) (October 19, 2020 – September 30, 2021)
- Jake and the Never Land Pirates (제이크와 네버랜드 해적들)
- Nina Needs to Go! (니나는 급해요) (June 1, 2015 – July 3, 2015)
- Miles from Tomorrowland (투모로우 나라의 마일스) (July 24, 2015 – December 9, 2016, first-run; October 14, 2019 – November 1, 2019, reruns)
- Handy Manny (만능수리공 매니) (November 2, 2015 – January 29, 2016, first-run; March 4, 2019 – May 3, 2019, reruns)
- Sheriff Callie's Wild West (보안관 칼리의 서부 모험) (November 7, 2015 – November 6, 2016)
- Special Agent Oso (특수요원 오소) (November 13, 2015 – April 28, 2017)
- Whisker Haven Tales with the Palace Pets (팰리스 펫) (November 23, 2015 – November 27, 2015)
- Jungle Junction (정글 대탐험) (January 4, 2016 – February 29, 2016, first-run; June 8, 2018 – July 10, 2018, reruns)
- My Friends Tigger & Pooh (내 친구 티거와 푸) (March 5, 2018 – March 30, 2018, reruns)
- P. King Duckling (오리친구 피킹) (April 8, 2019 – May 7, 2019, reruns)
- Mickey Mouse Clubhouse (미키마우스 클럽하우스) (September 2, 2019 – September 27, 2019, reruns)
- Henry Hugglemonster (헨리 허글 몬스터) (December 16, 2019 – December 20, 2019, reruns)

== Films ==
- Cars
- Cars 2
- Cars 3
- Camp Rock
- Kim Possible: A Sitch in Time
- Kim Possible
- Kim Possible Movie: So the Drama
- High School Musical
- High School Musical 2
- High School Musical 3
- El Desafío
- High School Musical: O Desafio
- Hannah Montana & Miley Cyrus: Best of Both Worlds Concert
- Hannah Montana: The Movie
- Teen Beach Movie
- Teen Beach 2
- The Cheetah Girls
- The Cheetah Girls 2
- The Cheetah Girls: One World
- Tini: The New Life of Violetta
- Hocus Pocus
- Zombies
- Spin
- Princess Protection Program
- Zombies 2
- Zombies 3
