= The Cheetah Girls =

The Cheetah Girls may refer to:

- The Cheetah Girls (novel series), a series of young adult novels by Deborah Gregory
- The Cheetah Girls (franchise), a media franchise based on the novels, including a film series
  - The Cheetah Girls (film), a 2003 Disney Channel Original Movie based on the books
    - The Cheetah Girls (soundtrack)
  - The Cheetah Girls 2, 2006 sequel
    - The Cheetah Girls 2 (soundtrack)
  - The Cheetah Girls: One World, 2008 sequel
    - The Cheetah Girls: One World (soundtrack)
  - The Cheetah Girls (video game), the video game inspired by the first two films
  - The Cheetah Girls: Pop Star Sensations, the Nintendo DS game inspired by the first two films
  - The Cheetah Girls: Passport to Stardom, the Nintendo DS game inspired by the first three films
- The Cheetah Girls (group), a musical group made famous by the films of the books

== See also ==
- Cheetah Girl, a villain in the 2013 Indian film Krrish 3
