= Ramji Londonwaley =

2005 film by Sanjay Dayma

- Poster
- Directed by: Sanjay Dayma
- Screenplay by: Sanjay Dayma; R. Madhavan; Jai Verma; Manish Tiwari; Avantika Hari
- Story by: Kamal Haasan
- Based on: Nala Damayanthi by: Mouli; Kamal Haasan
- Produced by: Sunanda Murali Manohar
- Starring: R. Madhavan; Samita Bangargi
- Cinematography: Ravi Varman
- Edited by: Sanjay Sankla
- Music by: Songs: Vishal Bhardwaj; Background Score: Pravin Mani
- Release date: 2 September 2005
- Running time: 154 minutes
- Country: India
- Language: Hindi
- Budget: ₹4 crore
- Box office: ₹ 2.95 crore

Ramji Londonwaley (transl. Ramji, the man from London) is a 2005 Indian Hindi-language comedy-drama film directed by Sanjay Dayma and produced by Sunanda Murali Manohar. The film stars Madhavan and Samita Bangargi. Madhavan also worked as the dialogue writer for the film. The film had a theatrical release across India on 2 September 2005. Featuring a story written by Kamal Haasan, the film is a remake of Madhavan's Tamil film Nala Damayanthi (2003)

== Plot ==
Ramji is a naive and docile Bihari cook who has taken upon himself the sole responsibility of marrying his sister to a good family, as they are orphans. He eventually finds a good suitor for her, and then he has to shell out dowry for the groom's family, where the marriage is arranged and preparations made. Therefore, Ramji plans to go to London and work as a chef for a multimillion-dollar London-based British Indian businessman family. The arrangement is that Ramji will have to send part of his salary as compensation for the dowry he owes. Unfortunately, on the day Ramji arrives at the employer's doorstep, the millionaire who hired him is very sick and eventually passes away before signing Ramji's paperwork, leaving him jobless. Desperate to stay and earn the money needed for his sister's dowry, he starts working illegally (without work permit) as an expert Indian chef in an Indian restaurant owned by an NRI, Guru, who has a wife and a handicapped son. Eventually, due to his good manners, friendliness, and expert skills, he wins the family's heart. As the restaurant becomes lucrative due to Ramji's excellent culinary skills, the police are on his heels.

Jai Kapoor, Guru's cunning lawyer friend, explains that the only way out is marriage to a British citizen and suggests Ramji marry his own girlfriend, Samira. Guru also convinces Ramji to do a marriage of convenience so that Guru can put up a defence in a case filed against his restaurant for hiring illegal immigrants. Ramji reluctantly agrees for a "fake" marriage with Jai's girlfriend Samira, and they get married over the weekend inside a church (so that paperwork comes faster), and he converts to Christianity as Robert. For all these gimmicks, the lawyer charges heavy fees from Mr. Guru and deposits them in the joint account of his wife Samira.

The police become more and more suspicious that this is a fake marriage and refer the matter to the consulate. The embassy invites both Ramji and Samira for an interview, for which they start preparing by getting to know each other better. By this time, Ramji finds out more about the cunning, shrewd character of Jai (the lawyer) in a chance meeting at the bus stop with Jai's ex-wife. The lady explains how Jai had promised her so many things and then suddenly deserted her and her son—for which she will seek revenge on him for abandoning his family. Ramji explains this all to Samira, and Samira also meets with Jai's ex-wife. In the meantime, constant stalking by the police forces Samira and Ramji to stay/live together to avoid detection by authorities. Samira is deeply troubled with the rural mannerisms of Ramji. To break the ice, Ramji cooks delicacies for Samira and wins her heart. Gradually, Samira also realises that Jai is merely fooling around with her life and doesn't really love her.

Meanwhile, Ramji is not able to send the dowry installments as promised, and his sister's in-laws throw her out of the house. Ramji's sister desperately calls Ramji, and Samira answers the call and handles the situation by sending all the money received for the fake marriage in her and Jai's joint account to her and making sure her long-time friend, Pappu is taken care of and marries her. Unfortunately, in their final interview with the consulate, Ramji blurts out more than he is asked at the interview at the immigration office, gets caught, gets his application rejected as a result and is forced to return to India (due to being an illegal entrant). However, as Ramji is preparing to be deported, good news comes: Ramji wins a cooking competition (which Samira had enlisted him for) and thus wins more money and employment opportunities at the Ritz Hotel.

Ramji however decides not to stay in UK. He explains to Samira that he will use his £50,000 competition money to build an English school in his village so no one will be illiterate. Samira decides to join Ramji in his return to India and married him. After 10 months, his restaurant is ready in India. His sister is happy and now has just had a baby. In the meantime, they are all waiting for a mystery guest to inaugurate the restaurant. This turns out to be Amitabh Bachchan, and the movie ends with Bachchan cutting the ribbon.

== Cast ==
- R. Madhavan as Ramnarayan Tiwari (Ramji) / Robert
- Samita Bangargi as Samira (Sammy/Sam)
- Asmita Sharma. as Parvathi (Ramji'sister)
- Harsh Chhaya as Guru
- Sunita Sengupta as Guru's Wife
- Satish Shah as Bishambar Mehra
- Rajendranath Zutshi as Jai Kapoor
- Akhilendra Mishra as Mishra
- Abha Parmar as Ramji's mother
- Aditya Lakhia as Pappu
- Amitabh Bachchan as himself (Guest appearance)

== Production ==
Ramji Londonwaley is a remake of the Tamil film Nala Damayanthi (2003) written by Kamal Haasan, starring R. Madhavan in the lead role. Originally titled Bawarchi (Transl: Chef/cook), Madhavan was chosen to star in the lead role, and also wrote the film's dialogues, while Sanjay Dayma was selected as the director of the project following his work as an associate director in films such as Lagaan (2001). Madhavan chose to rewrite the second half of the original film and change the climax to his preference. Actress Samita Bangargi was cast in the film after Madhavan's wife Sarita had recommended her after seeing her work in Yeh Kya Ho Raha Hai? (2002) and in the promotional videos of Shaadi Ka Laddoo (2004). She was cast in the film as a non-resident Indian from London.

The film was primarily shot throughout 2004 in London and Reading The shoot occurred swiftly, with a particular set of 20 minutes of screen time being shot in six hours. As a result of the 2004 Madrid train bombings, the team found it difficult to gain permission to shoot the film at an airport. Eventually after failing to convince officials at Heathrow Airport and Gatwick Airport, they had to settle for filming a sequence at Leicester Airport.

== Soundtrack ==
The film's soundtrack was composed by Vishal Bhardwaj and Pravin Mani.

	Song	Singer
1	Bhool Na Jaying	Daler Mehndi, Rakesh Pandit
2	Ramji Ke Paas Hai Sab Ke Liye Masala	Raghuvir Yadav
3	London London	Sukhwinder Singh
4	Do Do Do Do	Suresh Wadkar, Alisha Chinai
5	Dhooan Dhooan	Sonu Nigam
6	Ramji Bhangra (Remix)	Pravin Mani, Arjun
7	When Cultures Meets	Pravin Mani
8	When Soul Speaks	Pravin Mani
9	Ramji In Club	Pravin Mani

== Release ==
The film was premiered in London on 2 September 2005, with the release marking the launch of Patricia Hewitt's UK's 'Bollywood Initiative' which encouraged British investment in Bollywood cinema. Upon release, the film garnered positive reviews from critics, but the small nature of the film meant that it only became an average grosser at the box office. Critic Baradwaj Rangan wrote, "This may be the story of a cook, but there’s also food for thought!" Taran Adarsh wrote, "On the whole, Ramji Londonwaley is a feel-good entertainer that gives you a positive feeling at the conclusion of the show". The BBC's Dharmesh Rajput gave the film a predominantly positive review, stating "it's overlong and unnecessarily complicated but R Madhavan's central performance still manages to charm your socks off". The critic added the film is "gracelessly edited and over-stuffed with sub-plots – but the film's saving grace is its cast", and praises that "Madhavan's charismatic and expressive performance provides most of the film's nicely understated humour" and British actress Shalu Verma and Bangargi also impress". A critic from Rediff.com wrote "it's irritating because this could have been polished into a good film, maybe even a memorable film" and that "Madhavan makes a valiant attempt, and renders the film almost entirely watchable, but that happens to be a big almost, sadly".
