= The Cheetah Girls: Next Gen =

Upcoming American musical television film

- Based on: The Cheetah Girls by Deborah Gregory
- Screenplay by: Kara Holden; Sarah Watson; Deborah Swisher
- Directed by: Billie Woodruff
- Starring: Raven-Symoné; Adrienne Bailon; Sabrina Bryan; Leah Sava Jeffries; Carmen Sanchez; Kaileen Chang; Sophie Lennon; Kamogelo Ramashala; Sophia Bush; Lynn Whitfield
- Country of origin: United States
- Original language: English

Production
- Executive producers: Debra Martin Chase; Raven-Symoné
- Producers: Adrienne Bailon; Billie Woodruff
- Production location: South Africa
- Production company: Disney Kids & Family

Original release
- Network: Disney Channel; Disney+
- Release: 2027

Related
- The Cheetah Girls; The Cheetah Girls 2 The Cheetah Girls: One World

The Cheetah Girls: Next Gen is an upcoming American musical film directed by Billie Woodruff. It is a sequel to The Cheetah Girls: One World (2008) and the fourth installment of The Cheetah Girls franchise. It will premiere in 2027 on Disney Channel and Disney+. Raven-Symoné reprises her role as Galleria, after being absent from the third installment. Adrienne Bailon and Sabrina Bryan will also return for the film. Kiely Williams is not set to return.

== Premise ==
Galleria and Chanel take Faith, Galleria's daughter, Dior, Chanel's sister and their friends to Africa to volunteer at a wildlife sanctuary. At the same time, the new generation of Cheetahs will "test their friendship, find their voice, and discover the true Cheetah spirit as they save the preserve and ultimately take the stage as the new Cheetah Girls".

== Cast ==
- Raven-Symoné as Galleria Garibaldi
- Adrienne Bailon-Houghton as Chanel Simmons
- Sabrina Bryan as Dorinda Thomas
- Leah Sava Jeffries as Faith, Galleria's daughter
- Carmen Sanchez as Dior, Chanel's younger sister
- Kaileen Chang as Ruby
- Sophie Lennon as Brooklyn
- Kamogelo Ramashala as Kendi
- Sophia Bush as Jennifré
- Lori Anne Alter as Juanita Simmons, Chanel and Dior's mother
- Lynn Whitfield as Dorothea Garibaldi, Galleria's mother and Faith's maternal grandmother

== Production ==
"I honestly attribute it to the fact that it's a good girl-empowerment story about friendship and family, and standing up for your besties. And that is, no matter how juvenile it might sound, important to continuously tell that story so girls know how important it is to stand up for your friends."

— Raven-Symoné about the franchise's longevity

When asked about a reunion in 2021, Adrienne Bailon stated she would be willing to do one, but was concerned about "ruining" the memory of the franchise. In the years following, both Raven-Symoné and Sabrina Bryan expressed interest in doing a reboot.

Filming was confirmed to begin in July 2026 in South Africa. Raven-Symoné will serve as an executive producer, along with Debra Martin Chase. The film features choreography from Kyle Hanagami. President of Disney Kids & Family, Ayo Davis, released a statement saying: "The Cheetah Girls has always been about friendship, music, and empowering young people to use their voice. That spirit connected deeply with a generation of fans, and it still resonates today. Bringing this dynamic new group of young stars to the franchise allows us to continue that legacy for a new era of kids and families". Filming wrapped in September 2026 and is expected to have a 2027 release.

=== Casting ===
The film was officially announced on July 8, 2026, with Symoné posting a video on her social media, which included the project's title and confirmed to reprise her role. She was notably absent from The Cheetah Girls: One World due to feeling ostracized during filming of The Cheetah Girls 2. Bailon was confirmed to return, as well as serving as a co-producer, with Bryan set to make a special appearance in the film. Lynn Whitfield and Lori Anne Alter are also confirmed to return for the film, both whom where absent from the third installment. Original cast member, Kiely Williams is not set to return as Aqua.

Four new cast members will portray a new generation of the Cheetah Girls. This includes Leah Sava Jeffries (Percy Jackson and the Olympians), who will portray Galleria's daughter, Faith; Carmen Sanchez (Electric Bloom) as Chanel's sister, Dior; Kaileen Chang as Ruby and Sophie Lennon as Brooklyn. Additionally, newcomer Kamogelo Ramashala, who was cast through a global casting call and is from South Africa, will play Kendi. Sophia Bush was cast in a supporting role.
