= Time Traveler Luke =

- Genre: Fantasy; Action; Adventure
- Voices of: Ahn Youngmi; Kim Chae-ha; Kim Bo-min; Yun Yong Sik; Kim Hyeon-gu; Kim Min-ju; Kim Jeong-a; Katie Leigh
- Countries of origin: South Korea; Malaysia
- Original language: Korean
- No. of seasons: 1
- No. of episodes: 52

Production
- Producers: Anyzac; SK Broadband; Daewon Media; Giggle Garage

Original release
- Network: KBS1; TVS; Disney Channel; Astro NJOI
- Release: October 8, 2020 – July 17, 2021

Time Traveler Luke (Korean: 시간여행자 루크) is a South Korean-Malaysian animated series produced jointly by Anyzac (which also owns Zombiedumb), SK Broadband, Daewon Media, and Giggle Garage. The series is set during the interwar period, and it is inspired by the steampunk genre.

== Premise ==
The series takes place at a hotel that contains various historical artifacts. The hotel's founder, Paul, is a time traveler who travels through time using a secret elevator hidden behind a library bookshelf to protect and preserve artifacts that are in danger of disappearing. One day, Paul's grandson Luke, who is aware of the existence of this secretive elevator, uses it to travel through time, protect missing artifacts, and find his grandfather. However, he meets Indiana, another time traveler who steals artifacts and seeks wealth and honor.

== Production ==
The series' development goes back to 2017, when the series was originally titled Bellboy Luke, as evidenced by the now-unavailable trailer video uploaded on 2018 by the official YouTube channel, which used to upload videos about their prior series, Zombiedumb. In the Bellboy Luke clips, Jean originally had darker skin and black hair, while Luke largely remained unchanged. However, there is also a poster that was initially titled Luke: Lost & Found.

== Characters ==
=== Relic Guardians ===
- Luke (voiced by Kim Chae-ha in the Korean-language version) is a bellboy who travels through time to find and protect historical artifacts.
- Jean (voiced by Ahn Youngmi in the Korean-language version)
- Leo
- Paul is Luke's grandfather.

== Episodes ==
Chapter	Episodes	Originally released	
Chapter	Episodes	First released	Last released
Rise of the Relic Guardian	5	May 9, 2020	June 6, 2020
The Möbius Time Loop	5	June 13, 2020	July 11, 2020
Machupicchu, the Lost Sky City	5	July 18, 2020	August 29, 2020
Hello, Newton!	5	September 5, 2020	October 3, 2020
The Blind Swordstress and the Sword of Goujian	5	October 17, 2020	November 14, 2020
Flamboyant Knight: Jeanne D'Arc	5	December 26, 2020	January 23, 2021
Relic Guardian vs Relic Hunter	5	January 30, 2021	March 6, 2021
Mr. X	5	March 13, 2021	April 17, 2021
The Blacksmith's Legacy	5	April 24, 2021	May 29, 2021
The Last Time Travel	6	June 5, 2021	July 10, 2021
Finale	1	July 17, 2021	

No.	Title	Chapter	Time	Place	Original release date
1	"The Boy who Travels through Time" (Korean: 시간을 넘나드는 소년)	Rise of the Relic Guardian	1320 B.C.	Ancient Egypt	May 9, 2020
2	"The Courageous Guardian of Egypt" (Korean: 이집트의 용맹한 전사)	Rise of the Relic Guardian	1320 B.C.	Ancient Egypt	May 16, 2020
3	"Prophecy of the Broken Mirror" (Korean: 깨진 거울속의 예언)	Rise of the Relic Guardian	1320 B.C.	Ancient Egypt	May 23, 2020
4	"Puzzle of the Abu Simbel Temples" (Korean: 아부 심벨 신전의 퍼즐)	Rise of the Relic Guardian	1320 B.C.	Ancient Egypt	May 30, 2020
5	"Rise of the Relic Guardian" (Korean: 유물수비대의 탄생)	Rise of the Relic Guardian	1320 B.C.	Ancient Egypt	June 6, 2020
6	"Midnight Thief" (Korean: 한밤중의 도둑 소녀)	The Möbius Time Loop	79 A.D.	Pompeii, Ancient Rome	June 13, 2020
7	"Mia and the Statue of the Faun" (Korean: 미아와 파우니 동상)	The Möbius Time Loop	79 A.D.	Pompeii, Ancient Rome	June 20, 2020
8	"Pompeii's Final Day" (Korean: 폼페이 최후의 날)	The Möbius Time Loop	79 A.D.	Pompeii, Ancient Rome	June 27, 2020
9	"The Time Traveller's Golden Rule" (Korean: 시간여행자의 철칙)	The Möbius Time Loop	79 A.D.	Pompeii, Ancient Rome	July 4, 2020
10	"Goodbye, Mia" (Korean: 안녕 미아)	The Möbius Time Loop	79 A.D.	Pompeii, Ancient Rome	July 11, 2020
11	"The Witch's Curse" (Korean: 마녀의 저주)	Machupicchu, the Lost Sky City	1492	Machu Picchu, Peru	July 18, 2020
12	"The Prophecy of the Witch" (Korean: 신탁받은 마녀)	Machupicchu, the Lost Sky City	1492	Machu Picchu, Peru	July 25, 2020
13	"The Hidden City in the Sky" (Korean: 숨겨진 공중 도시)	Machupicchu, the Lost Sky City	1492	Machu Picchu, Peru	August 1, 2020
14	"Another Relic to Protect" (Korean: 또 하나의 유물)	Machupicchu, the Lost Sky City	1492	Machu Picchu, Peru	August 22, 2020
15	"Battle Among the Clouds" (Korean: 구름 위의 대결전)	Machupicchu, the Lost Sky City	1492	Machu Picchu, Peru	August 29, 2020
16	"Hello, Mr. Newton!" (Korean: 헬로 뉴턴)	Hello, Newton!	1675	London, England	September 5, 2020
17	"In Search of the Philosopher's Stone" (Korean: 현자의 돌을 쫓아서)	Hello, Newton!	1675	London, England	September 12, 2020
18	"The Secret from Under the Seas" (Korean: 해저에서 건져 올린 비밀)	Hello, Newton!	1675	London, England	September 19, 2020
19	"Checkmate" (Korean: 체크메이트)	Hello, Newton!	1675	London, England	September 26, 2020
20	"Newton in Time" (Korean: 뉴턴의 시간여행)	Hello, Newton!	1675	London, England	October 3, 2020
21	"LingLing, the Swordstress" (Korean: 소녀 검객 링링)	The Blind Swordstress and the Sword of Goujian	207 B.C.	Spring and Autumn period, Qin Dynasty	October 17, 2020
22	"Following the Peony Flowers" (Korean: 모란꽃을 따라서)	The Blind Swordstress and the Sword of Goujian	207 B.C.	Spring and Autumn period, Qin Dynasty	October 24, 2020
23	"Secret of the Sword of Goujian" (Korean: 월왕구천검의 비밀)	The Blind Swordstress and the Sword of Goujian	207 B.C.	Spring and Autumn period, Qin Dynasty	October 31, 2020
24	"The Legendary Emperor's Mausoleum" (Korean: 전설 속 황제의 무덤)	The Blind Swordstress and the Sword of Goujian	207 B.C.	Spring and Autumn period, Qin Dynasty	November 7, 2020
25	"The Seal of Rage" (Korean: 분노의 전국옥새)	The Blind Swordstress and the Sword of Goujian	207 B.C.	Spring and Autumn period, Qin Dynasty	November 14, 2020
26	"The Girl who Dreams of Becoming Knight" (Korean: 기사를 꿈꾸는 소녀)	Flamboyant Knight: Jeanne D'Arc	1424	Île-de-France, France	December 26, 2020
27	"Secret of the Cathedral" (Korean: 대성당의 비밀)	Flamboyant Knight: Jeanne D'Arc	1424	Île-de-France, France	January 2, 2021
28	"A Lady Knight is Born" (Korean: 말괄량이 여기사의 탄생)	Flamboyant Knight: Jeanne D'Arc	1424	Île-de-France, France	January 9, 2021
29	"Relic Hunter Indiana" (Korean: 유물사냥꾼 인디아나)	Flamboyant Knight: Jeanne D'Arc	1424	Île-de-France, France	January 16, 2021
30	"Abbey of Angels, Mont-Saint-Michel" (Korean: 천사의 수도원 몽생미셸)	Flamboyant Knight: Jeanne D'Arc	1424	Île-de-France, France	January 23, 2021
31	"The Boomerang Wielding Relic Hunter" (Korean: 부메랑을 든 유물사냥꾼)	Relic Guardian vs Relic Hunter	1619	Angkor Wat, Cambodia	January 30, 2021
32	"In Search of Jean" (Korean: 진을 찾아서)	Relic Guardian vs Relic Hunter	1619	Angkor Wat, Cambodia	February 6, 2021
33	"Shadows over the Cambodian Temple" (Korean: 캄보디아 사원에 드리운 그림자)	Relic Guardian vs Relic Hunter	1619	Angkor Wat, Cambodia	February 20, 2021
34	"Relic Hunter VS Relic Guardian" (Korean: 유물사냥꾼 VS 유물수비대)	Relic Guardian vs Relic Hunter	1619	Angkor Wat, Cambodia	February 27, 2021
35	"The Seed of Life" (Korean: 생명의 씨앗)	Relic Guardian vs Relic Hunter	1619	Angkor Wat, Cambodia	March 6, 2021
36	"The Diamond Scepter Heist" (Korean: 사라진 다이아몬드 홀)	Mr. X	1790	Russian Empire	March 13, 2021
37	"Mr. X: Suspect" (Korean: 미스터X 용의자)	Mr. X	1790	Russian Empire	March 27, 2021
38	"Mr. X: Trap" (Korean: 미스터X의 함정)	Mr. X	1790	Russian Empire	April 3, 2021
39	"Mr. X: Appearance" (Korean: 미스터X의 등장)	Mr. X	1790	Russian Empire	April 10, 2021
40	"Golden Peacock Clock of Love" (Korean: 사랑의 황금 공작 시계)	Mr. X	1790	Russian Empire	April 17, 2021
41	"Astrolabe Pieces on the Relic" (Korean: 유물에 박힌 아스트롤라베 조각)	The Blacksmith's Legacy	1660	Mughal Empire, India	April 24, 2021
42	"Sword of Akbar the Great" (Korean: 악바르 대제의 보검)	The Blacksmith's Legacy	1660	Mughal Empire, India	May 1, 2021
43	"A Blacksmith is Born" (Korean: 대장장이의 탄생)	The Blacksmith's Legacy	1660	Mughal Empire, India	May 8, 2021
44	"Indiana's Past" (Korean: 인디아나의 과거)	The Blacksmith's Legacy	1660	Mughal Empire, India	May 15, 2021
45	"Infiltration Over the Valley" (Korean: 협곡 위의 침투작전)	The Blacksmith's Legacy	1660	Mughal Empire, India	May 29, 2021
46	"Theo, the Kid Philosopher" (Korean: 꼬마 철학자 테오)	The Last Time Travel	406 B.C.	Ancient Greece	June 5, 2021
47	"Friends Gone Missing" (Korean: 사라진 친구들)	The Last Time Travel	406 B.C.	Ancient Greece	June 12, 2021
48	"New Eden" (Korean: 뉴 에덴)	The Last Time Travel	406 B.C.	Ancient Greece	June 19, 2021
49	"The Relic's Message" (Korean: 유물에 실려온 편지)	The Last Time Travel	406 B.C.	Ancient Greece	June 26, 2021
50	"History Guard, Assemble!" (Korean: 역사수비대의 활약)	The Last Time Travel	406 B.C.	Ancient Greece	July 3, 2021
51	"Landing Acropolis" (Korean: 아크로폴리스 착륙작전)	The Last Time Travel	406 B.C.	Ancient Greece	July 10, 2021
52	"The Final Time Travel" (마지막 시간여행)	Finale	Modern era	New York City, United States	July 17, 2021
