= Daryanani =

Daryanani is a surname. Notable people with the surname include:

- Deepti Daryanani, actress
- Kai Daryanani (born 2005), British-Indian racing driver based in Hong Kong
