= The Cheetah Girls (franchise) =

Eponymous media franchise

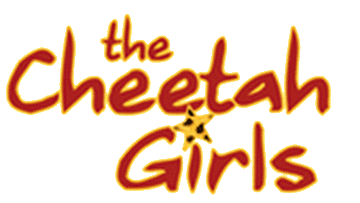
- Created by: Deborah Gregory
- Original work: The Cheetah Girls (2003), based on the novel series
- Owner: Disney Channel
- Years: 2003–2008; 2027

Print publications
- Novel: The Cheetah Girls (novel series)

Films and television
- Television films: The Cheetah Girls (2003); The Cheetah Girls 2 (2006); The Cheetah Girls: One World (2008); The Cheetah Girls: Next Gen (2027)

Games
- Video games: The Cheetah Girls (2006); The Cheetah Girls: Pop Star Sensations (2007); The Cheetah Girls: Passport to Stardom (2008)

Audio
- Soundtracks: The Cheetah Girls (2003); The Cheetah Girls 2 (2006); The Cheetah Girls: One World (2008)
- Original music: The Cheetah Girls (group) studio albums: Cheetah-licious Christmas (2005); TCG (2007)

The Cheetah Girls is a Disney Channel media franchise based on the novel series of the same name by Deborah Gregory, who was also co-producer of the first three films. The films are about a female vocal group seeking success and fortune.

== Films ==
The Cheetah Girls is a musical comedy trilogy series produced by Debra Martin Chase, co-produced by Cheryl Hill and executive produced by Whitney Houston. Based on young adult book series of the same name by Deborah Gregory, actresses including Raven-Symoné, Adrienne Bailon, Sabrina Bryan, Kiely Williams, and Lynn Whitfield are featured in the films. Besides The Cheetah Girls which was set in New York City, each of the other films have been set in a foreign country: The Cheetah Girls 2 in Barcelona, Spain, and The Cheetah Girls: One World in New Delhi, India.

=== The Cheetah Girls (2003) ===
A four-member teen girl group named the Cheetah Girls (Raven-Symoné, Adrienne Bailon, Sabrina Bryan and Kiely Williams) go to a Manhattan High School for the Performing Arts and try to become the first freshmen to win the talent show in the school's history. During the talent show auditions, they meet a big-time producer named Jackal Johnson (Vince Corazza), who tries to make the group into superstars, but the girls run into many problems. Galleria becomes a full-time snob and forgets her friends, Dorinda has to choose between her friends or the dance club and other things that could break the Cheetah Girls apart permanently. The group faces many tough decisions, but they all know the right way to go in the end.

=== The Cheetah Girls 2 (2006) ===
The movie begins in Manhattan, set two years after the first film, where the Cheetah Girls have just completed their junior year and are performing at a Graduation Party for the Manhattan Magnet's Class of 2006 ("The Party's Just Begun").

Later while having a sleep-over at Galleria (Raven-Symoné)'s, Chanel (Adrienne Bailon) tells the girls that her mother, Juanita (Lori Anne Alter), is planning a trip to Barcelona, Spain, where they will be visiting Luc (Abel Folk), Juanita's boyfriend. Chanel is bummed and does not want to see Luc while the other girls are upset about being separated for the summer when Aquanette (Kiely Williams) sees a shooting star and the girls make a wish together - to go to Spain with Chanel. At that very moment, one of the girl's magazines flips pages until it comes across an ad for a Barcelona music festival. Galleria enters the Cheetah Girls and the next day, her mother Dorethea (Lynn Whitfield), Juanita, and the Cheetah Girls all travel to Spain.

When the girls arrive in Barcelona, they do some shopping before resting in a Cafe. Soon they hear a guitar playing and meet Angel (Peter Vives), a mysterious guitar player who accompanies them around Barcelona as they sing to the entire city, and he becomes Galleria's love interest ("Strut").

The next day the girls audition for the festival and earn a spot ("Cheetah Sisters (Barcelona Mix)").

The next day at breakfast, they meet Joaquin (Golan Yosef), a Count, Luc's godson, and a handsome dancer who becomes a love interest for Dorinda (Sabrina Bryan). The next day after Dorinda finds out Joaquin is a dancer, she goes to his studio, where he teaches her tango ("Dance With Me"). That night Joaquin takes the Cheetahs to the Dancing Cat, a local Spanish night club where all the new artists perform their songs ("Why Wait") ("A La Nanita Nana").

There they meet Spanish pop artist Marisol (Belinda), who will also compete in the Music Festival, and her manager/mother, Lola (Kim Manning), who plans a scheme to break up the Cheetah Girls, as they pose a threat to her daughter's chances in the competition, and she starts making Marisol distract Chanel from The Cheetah Girls. Meanwhile, Aqua and Dorothea have been designing clothes with Dorothea's old friends, Juanita is trying to get a proposal out of Luc, Dorinda is teaching hip hop to Joaquin's class, and Galleria is the only one focused on the competition, as she is writing a song called, "Amigas Cheetahs", which they will sing at the competition ("Do Your Own Thing").

Galleria notices that everyone is getting involved in other activities except for her ("It's Over"), and eventually decided to take a train to Paris, where she can meet up with her father, Francobollo, and he will take her back home to Manhattan. While at a train station, the other three girls find Galleria and sing the starting sequence of "Amigas Cheetahs", and Galleria says she will only come back if they stay focused. While Chanel walked around the house, she overhears Juanita talking to Dorothea about how she believes that Luc doesn't want to marry her because Chanel doesn't like him. Luc later proposes to Juanita, after Chanel gives him permission, and she gladly accepts. Luc tells Chanel that she can stay in New York with her friends for her upcoming senior year. However, the Cheetah Girls' dreams are in serious trouble. While they were performing Step Up, Lola convinces the Dancing Cat's manager to pay the Cheetah Girls money. The competition will only allow amateur performs to compete. Accepting payment from the Dancing Cat makes the Cheetah Girls professional performers. Angel, who was present during the entire exchange, investigates.

Right before Chanel is going to get changed to perform with Marisol, the Festival Director informs that the Cheetah Girls are able to perform after getting a tip. Everyone is surprised when they see that the informer was his nephew, Angel. He informed that Lola tried to sabotage the Cheetahs, and his uncle reinstates the girls as the Cheetah Girls. Lola tries to dispute, but the Director will not hear it. Marisol finally tells off her mother, saying she is quitting the competition because she loves to sing and her mother is just desperate to make her a star. The Cheetah Girls then perform "Amigas Cheetahs", and as a surprise, bring Marisol onto the stage, along with Joaquin's dancing crew, Angel on the guitar and the Director on the trumpet. Their song is a hit with the crowd.

=== The Cheetah Girls: One World (2008) ===
With Galleria (Raven-Symoné) at the University of Cambridge England, the girls are Chanel (Adrienne Bailon), Dorinda (Sabrina Bryan), and Aquanette (Kiely Williams) are cast in the lavish new Bollywood movie "Namaste Bombay". The Cheetah Girls travel across the globe to India. There, they meet Rahim (Rupak Ginn), the man cast as the lead, whom they realize is attractive, yet somewhat clumsy. After meeting the movie's choreographer, Gita (Deepti Daryanani), a dance battle erupts between themselves and Gita with her backup dancers, they discover that the musical's director, Vikram "Vik" (Michael Steger), must choose only one Cheetah for the role as the budget is only enough for one star.

When it becomes apparent that they must travel home, they are upset, until realizing they may each try out for the lead. Though they all make a promise to be fair in the competition, situations arise in which each member becomes jealous of the others' specific talents. Chanel befriends Vik, Dorinda befriends Rahim, and Aqua befriends a boy she has been in contact with since before leaving America, Amar (Kunal Sharma). Each girl is led to believe the producer of the film, Khamal (Roshan Seth), Vik's uncle, will choose her after the audition. Chanel is told because she is the better singer, she will receive the role, while Dorinda is promised the role as she is the best dancer, while Aqua is convinced the coveted role will be hers as she is the best actress. The three Cheetahs audition against one another with Chanel being awarded the role, which she later refuses realizing, as do the other Cheetahs, that friendship and unity are more important than furthering their individual or group careers.

After refusing the role, they set to convince Khamal to award Gita as the lead, to which he reluctantly agrees, ending in a scene from "Namaste Bombay" in which the Cheetahs sing and dance the titular song, "One World".

=== The Cheetah Girls: Next Gen (2027) ===
A fourth film was confirmed on July 9, 2026, with Raven-Symoné set to reprise her role as Galleria. Adrienne Bailon and Sabrina Bryan are set to reprise their roles as Chanel and Dorinda, respectively, with Kiely Williams not expected to return as Aqua. Lynn Whitfield (Dorothea) and Lori Anne Alter (Juanita) are also confirmed to return for the film.

The film will follow Galleria and Chanel as they take the new group of Cheetahs to Africa to volunteer at a wildlife sanctuary. Four new cast members will portray a new generation of the Cheetah Girls. This includes Leah Sava Jefferies, who will portray Galleria's daughter, Faith; Carmen Sanchez as Chanel's sister, Dior; Kaileen Chang as Ruby; and Sophie Lennon as Brooklyn.

The film will go into production in South Africa in July 2026.

=== Release dates ===
Each film has received a Disney Channel release. The Cheetah Girls premiered on August 15, 2003, The Cheetah Girls 2 premiered on August 25, 2006 and The Cheetah Girls: One World premiered on August 22, 2008.

== Cast ==
Character	Films			
Character	The Cheetah Girls	The Cheetah Girls 2	The Cheetah Girls: One World	The Cheetah Girls: Next Gen
Character	2003	2006	2008	2027
Galleria Garibaldi	Raven-Symoné	Raven-Symoné	Mentioned only	Raven-Symoné
Chanel Simmons	Adrienne Bailon	Adrienne Bailon	Adrienne Bailon	Adrienne Bailon
Dorinda Thomas	Sabrina Bryan	Sabrina Bryan	Sabrina Bryan	Sabrina Bryan
Aquanette Walker	Kiely Williams	Kiely Williams	Kiely Williams	—N/a
Dorothea Garibaldi	Lynn Whitfield	Lynn Whitfield	—N/a	Lynn Whitfield
Juanita Simmons	Lori Anne Alter	Lori Anne Alter	Mentioned only	Lori Anne Alter
Derek	Kyle Schmid	—N/a	—N/a	—N/a
Francobollo Garibaldi	Juan Chioran	Mentioned only	—N/a	—N/a
Jackal Johnson	Vince Corazza	—N/a	—N/a	—N/a
Drinka Champagne	Sandra Caldwell	—N/a	—N/a	—N/a
Mrs. Bosco	Kim Roberts	Mentioned only	—N/a	—N/a
Marisol Durán	—N/a	Belinda Peregrín	—N/a	—N/a
Joaquin	—N/a	Golan Yosef	Mentioned only	—N/a
Angel	—N/a	Peter Vives	—N/a	—N/a
Lola Durán	—N/a	Kim Manning	—N/a	—N/a
Luc	Mentioned only	Abel Folk	—N/a	—N/a
Vikram Bhatia	—N/a	—N/a	Michael Steger	—N/a
Amar	—N/a	—N/a	Kunal Sharma	—N/a
Gita	—N/a	—N/a	Deepti Daryanani	—N/a
Rahim Khan	—N/a	—N/a	Rupak Ginn	—N/a
Kamal Bhatia	—N/a	—N/a	Roshan Seth	—N/a
Faith	—N/a	—N/a	—N/a	Leah Sava Jeffries
Dior	—N/a	—N/a	—N/a	Carmen Sanchez
Ruby	—N/a	—N/a	—N/a	Kaileen Chang
Brooklyn	—N/a	—N/a	—N/a	Sophie Lennon
Kendi	—N/a	—N/a	—N/a	Kamogelo Ramashala
Jennifré	—N/a	—N/a	—N/a	Sophia Bush

Note: A gray cell indicates character did not appear in that medium

== In other media ==
=== Video games ===
There are several video game tie-ins based on the series. The Cheetah Girls is a video game for the Game Boy Advance based on the franchise's two films. It was developed by Gorilla Systems, Inc. and released to the public by Buena Vista Games on September 12, 2006. A sequel, The Cheetah Girls: Pop Star Sensations, was released for Nintendo DS on October 9, 2007. A third installment, The Cheetah Girls: Passport to Stardom, was released for Nintendo DS on August 19, 2008, in North America and December 8 in PAL regions. In the game, the player controls the band, and plays as each Cheetah Girl. The player searches Manhattan, completing tasks such as finding an agent, selecting clothes to make outfits, choreographing new dance moves, and creating their own music for demo tracks. The player can earn cash by playing various mini-games, including such as flipping ribs, teaching dance, and selling clothes. Throughout the game, the Cheetah Girls perform shows in a variety of venues. Prior to performing, the player chooses the song, lighting, and visual effects. During the performances, the player plays a rhythm mini-game where they must time inputs on the controller to the visuals onscreen.

=== Television series ===
Adrienne Bailon, Sabrina Bryan and Kiely Williams appear in the second special of Studio DC: Almost Live (2008), performing "Dance Me If You Can" from The Cheetah Girls: One World along with Miss Piggy. The three also appear as guests in The Suite Life of Zack & Cody episode "Doin' Time in Suite 2330" (2008).

== See also ==
- The Cheetah Girls (group)
