= Funjabbi Chak De =

Hindi comedy television show

- Created by: Endemol India
- Starring: Navjot Singh Sidhu & Mandira Bedi
- Opening theme: "Funjabbi Chak De"
- Country of origin: India
- No. of seasons: 1
- No. of episodes: 29

Production
- Running time: approx. 52 minutes

Original release
- Network: STAR One
- Release: 16 November 2007 – 30 May 2008

Funjabbi Chak De is a Hindi entertainment comedy show that aired on STAR One. Hosted by Navjot Singh Sidhu and Mandira Bedi, the show features celebrity singers, chatting, music, stand-up comedians, and entertaining performers.
