= Samita Bangargi =

Indian actress

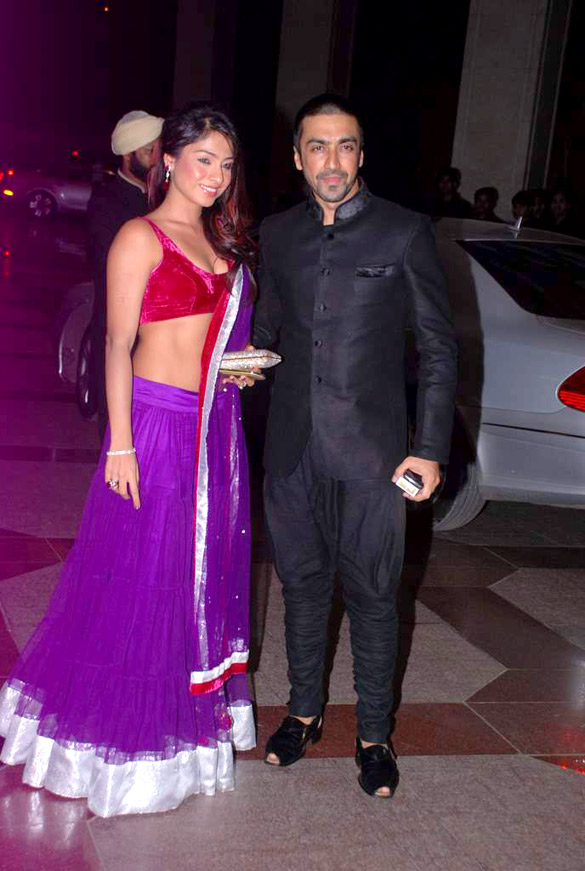
- Samita Bangargi with her husband Aashish Chaudhary at Esha Deol's sangeet ceremony
- Years active: 2002–2005
- Spouse: Ashish Chaudhary (m. 2006)
- Children: 3

Samita Bangargi is an Indian actress who is most known for her roles in Ramji Londonwaley (2005), Shaadi Ka Laddoo (2004) and Yeh Kya Ho Raha Hai? (2002).

== Personal life ==
Samita Bangargi married Ashish Chaudhary on 27 January 2006. The couple has 3 children, a son born in 2008 and twin daughters in 2014. Ashish lost his sister and brother in law in the 2008 Mumbai attacks in 2008, since then Ashish's nephew and niece also live with them.

== Filmography ==
| Year | Film | Role | Ref. |
|---|---|---|---|
| 2002 | Yeh Kya Ho Raha Hai? | Anu | |
| 2004 | Shaadi Ka Laddoo | Meneka | |
| 2005 | Ramji Londonwaley | Samira | |
