= Acceptance (film) =

- Genre: Comedy
- Based on: Acceptance by Susan Coll
- Teleplay by: Suzette Couture
- Directed by: Sanaa Hamri
- Starring: Mae Whitman; Kiersten Warren; Brigid Brannagh; Jonathan Keltz; Deepti Daryanani; Rob Mayes; Mark Moses; Joan Cusack
- Music by: Richard Marvin; Alan Derian
- Country of origin: United States
- Original language: English

Production
- Executive producers: Robert M. Sertner; Frank von Zerneck; Sharon Cicero; Ronnie Clemmer; Michele Samit
- Cinematography: Anthony B. Richmond; Frank Byers
- Editor: Tod Feuerman
- Running time: 88 minutes
- Production company: Von Zerneck/Sertner Films

Original release
- Network: Lifetime
- Release: August 22, 2009

Acceptance is a 2009 American comedy television film directed by Sanaa Hamri and starring Mae Whitman and Joan Cusack. The film is based on the 2007 novel by Susan Coll. It first aired on August 22, 2009, on Lifetime.

== Premise ==
High school student and overachiever Taylor Rockefeller must deal with the pressures of the college admissions process. She also cuts her wrists. She struggles with finding her dream colleges. In the meantime, her mother wants her to go to a top college so she can find a suitable husband. Taylor's parents are about to break up. Taylor realizes that lowly ranked Yates College is the right choice. However, her mother disagrees.

== Cast ==
- Mae Whitman as Taylor Rockefeller
- Joan Cusack as Nina Rockefeller
- Mark Moses as Wilson Rockefeller
- Brigid Brannagh as Olivia
- Deepti Daryanani as Maya
- Jonathan Keltz as Harry Burton
- Mike Pniewski as Basil Dickerson
- Kiersten Warren as Grace
- Robert Pralgo as Ari
- Rob Mayes as Justin Smelling
