= The Cheetah Girls (film) =

2003 American musical television film

- Promotional poster
- Based on: The Cheetah Girls by Deborah Gregory
- Written by: Alison Taylor
- Directed by: Oz Scott
- Starring: Raven; Adrienne Bailon; Kiely Williams; Sabrina Bryan; Juan Chioran; Lori Alter; Sandra Caldwell; Vincent Corazza; Kyle Schmid; Denton Rowe; Lynn Whitfield
- Music by: John Van Tongeren
- Countries of origin: United States; Canada
- Original language: English

Production
- Producers: Whitney Houston; Debra Martin Chase; Jacqueline George
- Cinematography: Derick V. Underschultz
- Editors: Terry Stokes; Debra Light
- Running time: 100 minutes
- Production companies: BrownHouse Productions; Martin Chase Productions

Original release
- Network: Disney Channel
- Release: August 15, 2003

Related
- The Cheetah Girls 2 The Cheetah Girls: One World; The Cheetah Girls: Next Gen

The Cheetah Girls is a 2003 American musical television film directed by Oz Scott and based on the book series of the same name by Deborah Gregory. The Cheetah Girls was the first musical Disney Channel Original Movie.

Upon release, the film was the number one rated basic cable telecast and premiered to 6.5 million viewers, a record for Disney at the time. The film's DVD sold over 800,000 copies. The film's soundtrack was released on August 12, 2003. It peaked at number 33 on the Billboard 200 and was certified double platinum by the RIAA. Following the success of the film, Disney began developing The Cheetah Girls as a real-life recording group.

== Plot ==
4 teen girls in Manhattan – Galleria, Chanel, Aqua, and Dorinda – perform at a children's birthday party as The Cheetah Girls. After the performance, Chanel rushes home to tell her mother about the show, but her mother is preoccupied preparing for a date with her new Parisian boyfriend. Galleria comes home to her parents, who chastise her for not taking phone messages for her mother or walking their Bichon Frise dog, Toto. Meanwhile, Dorinda attends to her job, doing janitorial work at a community center.

The girls hope to become the first freshmen to win the talent show in their school's history. After a successful audition for the talent show, a famous alumnus of the school, Jackal Johnson, expresses interest in signing The Cheetah Girls to his record label. Galleria introduces herself as the founder and songwriter of The Cheetah Girls, which is not appreciated by the group's other members. While Galleria's mother, Dorothea, is initially hesitant to let The Cheetah Girls pursue the opportunity with Jackal, she eventually allows the girls to have a meeting after being encouraged by Galleria's father.

The meeting is a success, and despite some ongoing concerns from Galleria, the girls begin to prepare to record their first song. Without asking the group's other members for opinions, Galleria suggests that The Cheetah Girls should not make time for the talent show due to their record deal, and criticizes Dorinda for repeatedly wearing the same dull clothing. Aqua encourages Chanel, Galleria's oldest friend, to speak to Galleria about her behavior. Meanwhile, Dorinda has the opportunity to take a dance audition at the center where she is employed. She is offered a paying role because of her work, but taking on the role would require her to leave the Cheetah Girls.

Later, Chanel becomes distressed after overhearing a voicemail suggesting that her mother was planning to sell their New York City apartment to move to Paris with her boyfriend. Feeling neglected, Chanel takes advantage of having her mother's credit card to go on a shopping spree on Madison Avenue. In an act of kindness, Chanel purchases a cheetah jacket for Dorinda who reveals her financial troubles: She is a poor foster child who lives in a 10-child household with a mother whose husband is a superintendent for the building. Chanel assures Dorinda that they will remain friends and she will always be a Cheetah Girl.

At the next meeting between The Cheetah Girls and Jackal Johnson, Jackal reveals that a marketing team has developed a new image for the group that will require them to wear masks and lip sync. Galleria is devastated by this and declares that the group refuse the offer, but the other girls stay behind due to their frustrations with Galleria's attitude. Galleria leaves under the impression that the other Cheetah Girls have taken the deal. Chanel arrives home where her mother reveals her credit card was declined due to Chanel's shopping spree. Chanel breaks down after thinking about how grateful she is for her mother given Dorinda's current status as a foster child, and Chanel's mother agrees to make more time for her daughter.

Later, Galleria's dog Toto falls into an obstruction on the Manhattan streets. This attracts a great deal of attention, including a live news story, which alerts the other Cheetah Girls members about what is going on and causes them to come to Toto's rescue. Their singing helps calm Toto down and allow for his safe removal from the obstruction. This act of bonding ultimately causes the girls to repair their friendship, and they go on to sing a new song on the news for all of New York to see. Jackal Johnson calls, voicing his regret trying to change The Cheetah Girls, but the girls refuse an offer with him. The Cheetah Girls end up winning the talent show, and the girls renew their commitment to achieving their dreams and maintaining their friendship.

== Cast ==
- Raven as Galleria "Bubbles" Garibaldi, the leader of The Cheetah Girls
- Adrienne Bailon as Chanel "Chuchie" Simmons, member of The Cheetah Girls
- Kiely Williams as Aquanette "Aqua" Walker, member of The Cheetah Girls
- Sabrina Bryan as Dorinda "Do" Thomas, member of The Cheetah Girls
- Lynn Whitfield as Dorothea Garibaldi, Galleria's mother
- Sandra Caldwell as Drinka Champane, the music teacher
- Juan Chioran as Francobollo Garibaldi, Galleria's father
- Lori Alter as Juanita Simmons, Chanel's mother
- Kyle Schmid as Derek, Galleria's love interest and rapper of Sonic Chaos
- Denton Rowe as Mackerel, Derek’s friend and rapper of Sonic Chaos
- Vincent Corazza as Jackal Johnson, record producer and the film's antagonist
- Kim Roberts as Mrs. Talondra Bosco, Dorinda's foster mom
- Caitlyn Williamson as Danielle Thomas, Dorinda's foster sister
- Kyle Saunders as Pucci Simmons, Chanel's little brother
- Ennis Esmer as Rick, a comedian

== Production ==
During casting auditions for the film, executives at Disney dropped the character Anginette Walker from the books, because they couldn't find the right twin girls to play both her and Aqua. According to author Deborah Gregory, Tia and Tamera Mowry's names were brought up in the meeting, but were considered to be "too sophisticated" for the roles. Singer Solange Knowles was originally cast to play the role of Aqua, however, Knowles pulled out of the film due to wanting to focus on the release of her debut album Solo Star. Kiely Williams initially auditioned for the role of Galleria, but did not get the part, and was subsequently offered the role of Aqua when Knowles pulled out. Williams was in the girl group 3LW with Adrienne Bailon at the time. Jurnee Smollett also auditioned for the film at one point.

The Cheetah Girls was directed by Oz Scott and produced by Whitney Houston, Debra Martin Chase and Cheryl Hill. The script was written by Alison Taylor, and the music was composed by John Van Tongeren. The film was shot from October to November 2002 in Toronto, Ontario, Canada and Manhattan, New York City, New York.

== Soundtrack ==
An original motion picture soundtrack containing songs from the film was released by Walt Disney Records on August 12, 2003. Several songs were recorded for the film, and though there had been no contractual plans for these songs to be released commercially, producer Debra Martin Chase was able to convince Disney to create new contracts and release the film's music as a soundtrack. It peaked at number 33 on the Billboard 200 and was certified double platinum by the RIAA.

== Awards ==
- 2004 – Nominated; Black Reel: Television Best Actress (Raven-Symoné)
- 2004 – Nominated; Black Reel: Television Best Supporting Actress (Lynn Whitfield)
- 2004 – Nominated; DGA Award for Outstanding Directorial Achievement in Children's Programs (Oz Scott)
- 2004 – Nominated; Image Award for Outstanding Performance in a Youth/Children's Program (Lynn Whitfield)
- 2012 – Nominated; Vision Award for Best Dramatic Performance (Lynn Whitfield)

== Reception ==
Upon release, the film was the number one rated basic cable telecast and premiered to 6.5 million viewers, a record for Disney at the time. The movie's DVD sold over 800,000 copies.

== Video games ==
- The Cheetah Girls was released in 2006 by Disney for Game Boy Advance.
- The Cheetah Girls: Pop Star Sensations was released in 2007 by Disney for Nintendo DS.
- The Cheetah Girls: Passport to Stardom was released in 2008 by Disney for Nintendo DS.

== Film sequels ==
=== The Cheetah Girls 2 ===
The Cheetah Girls 2 was released August 25, 2006.

The sequel follows the same main characters as the first film. They travel to Barcelona, Spain to compete in a musical performance competition and continue pursuing their dreams of pop superstardom. Its premiere received a total of over 8.1 million viewers.

The movie begins at a graduation party for the Manhattan Magnet's Class of 2006. While having a sleep-over at Galleria's apartment, Chanel tells the girls that her mother, Juanita, is planning a trip to Barcelona, where they will visit Juanita's long-term boyfriend. In an effort to spend summer together, the girls enter a music competition in Barcelona. Once there, a fellow competitor's mother conspires to break up The Cheetah Girls to increase her daughter's chances of winning. The whole film is shot in Barcelona, including the parts that took place in New York City.

=== The Cheetah Girls: One World ===
The third film in the series, The Cheetah Girls: One World, was released August 22, 2008. It premiered with 6.2 million viewers.

Chanel, Dorinda, and Aqua are cast in a musical film that will be shot in New Delhi, India. Once they arrive in the exotic city, the girls receive an unpleasant surprise: the movie's director must choose only one of them. The announcement puts a strain on the girls' friendship. However, the happy ending has all three of them dancing in the film. This film was shot in Udaipur, India.

Raven-Symoné did not reprise her role as Galleria, resulting in her character attending college off-screen. Raven-Symoné passed on the film due to her negative experience during The Cheetah Girls 2. She has described her co-stars as having acted "clique-ish", and recalled feeling "excluded". Instead, she preferred to concentrate on her solo music career.

=== The Cheetah Girls: Next Gen ===
A fourth film The Cheetah Girls: Next Gen was confirmed on July 8, 2026, with Raven-Symoné set to reprise her role as Galleria. Adrienne Bailon and Sabrina Bryan are set to reprise their roles as Chanel and Dorinda respectively, with Kiely Williams not expected to return as Aqua. Lynn Whitfield (Dorothea) and Lori Anne Alter (Juanita) are also confirmed to return for the film.

Four new cast members will portray a new generation of the Cheetah Girls. This includes Leah Sava Jefferies, who will portray Galleria's daughter, Faith; Carmen Sanchez as Chanel's sister, Dior; Kaileen Chang as Ruby and Sophie Lennon as Brooklyn. The film will follow Galleria and Chanel as they take the new group of Cheetahs to Africa to volunteer at a wildlife sanctuary.
