= Raj Kaushal =

Indian director, producer, stunt director (1970–2021)

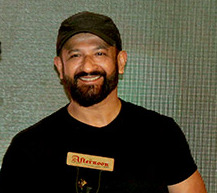
- Kaushal in May 2019
- Born: 15 August 1970
- Died: 30 June 2021 (aged 50)
- Occupation(s): Producer, Director
- Years active: 1992–2021
- Spouse: Mandira Bedi (m. 1999)
- Children: 2

Raj Kaushal (15 August 1970 – 30 June 2021) was an Indian director, producer who was active during the 1990s and mid 2000s. He was married to actress and TV presenter Mandira Bedi. He died on 30 June 2021 due to a heart attack.

== Filmography ==
Title	Year	Director	Producer
Akkad Bakkad Rafu Chakkar	2021	Yes	Yes
Anthony Kaun Hai	2006	Yes	
My Brother… Nikhil	2005		Yes
Shaadi Ka Laddoo	2004	Yes	Yes
Pyaar Mein Kabhi Kabhi	1999	Yes	Yes
