= Debra Martin Chase =

American film producer

- Born: October 11, 1956 (age 70); Great Lakes, Illinois, U.S.
- Education: Mount Holyoke College; Harvard Law School
- Occupation: Producer

Debra Martin Chase (born October 11, 1956) is an American film, television, and theater producer.

== Early life and education ==
Chase was born in Great Lakes, Illinois, but moved with her family as a child to Pasadena, California. She earned her B.A. from Mount Holyoke College in 1977 and J.D. from Harvard Law School in 1981.

== Legal career ==
Chase met with the general counsel at Columbia Pictures production company through a good friend's sister. Later she met with and became the executive assistant to Frank Price, chairman of Columbia Pictures. Chase worked with Price for a year. After Sony brought Mark Canton in for the top job and Price gained a spot for Chase on the creative staff, before he left the company.

== Career ==
In 2000, she started Martin Chase Productions and made a landmark deal with Disney, a partnership lasting 15 years before starting a new overall deal with Universal Television, a now division of Universal Studio Group. Prior to that, Chase ran Whitney Houston's BrownHouse Productions from 1995 to 2012 and Mundy Lane Entertainment, Denzel Washington’s production company, from 1992 to 1995.

Chase's 1996 film Courage Under Fire made her the first Black woman to produce a film that grossed over $100 million. Chase and Houston's first collaboration was on the 1997 TV film re-adaptation of Cinderella, which produced the biggest ratings of a Disney-themed film in over a decade with over 60 million viewers tuning into the film, later earning Chase and Houston an Emmy nomination for Outstanding Variety, Music or Comedy Series. In 2001, the duo co-produced The Princess Diaries, based on the novel of the same name. They partnered again three years later with The Princess Diaries 2: Royal Engagement, in 2004.

Houston and Chase also co-produced two of the first Cheetah Girls TV films. Houston and Chase's last production together was 2012's Sparkle, in which Houston played a co-starring role in and was her final film before her death in February 2012. The film was later released that August and became a modest success. She currently executive produces The Equalizer TV series starring Queen Latifah for Universal Television and CBS which is in its fifth season. Chase produced True True Spirit which debuted on Netflix in February 2023.

In 2022, Chase co-produced, in partnership with Marc Platt, the Broadway production of the Pulitzer Prize winning musical A Strange Loop which won Tony Awards for Best Musical and Best Book. She also produced the 2022 Broadway revival of the Pulitzer Prize winning play Suzan-Lori Parks’ Topdog/Underdog alongside Platt, which won the Tony for Best Revival of a Play. In 2024, Chase co-produced two plays – the original musical The Outsiders, based upon the beloved novel by S.E. Hinton and the cult classic movie directed by Francis Ford Coppola, which won four Tony Awards including Best Musical and Best Director of a Musical and Illinoise which was nominated for Best Musical and won the Tony for Best Choreography.

== Other ventures ==
Chase serves on the board of directors of B&G Foods, an American holding company for branded foods which trades on the New York Stock Exchange, where she chairs the Corporate Social Responsibility Committee; Bridge Investment Group, a publicly traded alternative asset management company; and Gaming and Leisure Properties, a publicly traded real estate investment trust.

She is a member of the Motion Picture Academy, where she serves on the Producers Executive Committee, the Television Academy, and the Broadway League, where she serves on the Tony management committee.

== Personal life ==
Chase was raised Catholic, stopped practicing as an adolescent, and later was married in the Church. She began attending Mass again some years later, identifying as Catholic in 2005.

Chase is an honorary member of Alpha Kappa Alpha sorority.

== Producer credits ==
She was a producer in all films unless otherwise noted.

=== Film ===
Year	Film	Credit	Notes
1996	Courage Under Fire	Executive producer	
1996	The Preacher's Wife	Co-producer	
2001	The Princess Diaries		
2004	The Princess Diaries 2: Royal Engagement		
2005	The Sisterhood of the Traveling Pants		
2008	The Sisterhood of the Traveling Pants 2		
2009	Byou 2		Direct-to-video
2010	Just Wright		
2012	An American Girl: McKenna Shoots for the Stars		Direct-to-video
2012	Sparkle		
2015	An American Girl: Grace Stirs Up Success		Direct-to-video
2016	An American Girl: Lea to the Rescue		Direct-to-video
2019	Harriet		
2023	True Spirit		Netflix
2023	Being Mary Tyler Moore		Documentary

=== Television ===
Year	Title	Credit	Notes
1997	Cinderella	Executive producer	Television film
2003	The Cheetah Girls	Executive producer	Television film
2003−06	Missing	Executive producer	
2006	The Cheetah Girls 2	Executive producer	Television film
2008	The Cheetah Girls: One World	Executive producer	Television film
2011	Lemonade Mouth	Executive producer	Television film
2013	Lovestruck: The Musical	Executive producer	Television film
2013	An American Girl: Saige Paints the Sky	Executive producer	Television film
2014	Aaliyah: The Princess of R&B	Executive producer	Television film
2016	Zoe Ever After	Executive producer	
2018	Get Christie Love!	Executive producer	Television pilot
2021–2025	The Equalizer	Executive producer	
2027	The Cheetah Girls: Next Gen	Executive producer	Television film; filming

=== Theater ===
Year	Title	Credit	Notes
2022	A Strange Loop	Co-producer	Broadway
2022	Topdog/Underdog	Co-producer	Broadway
2024	The Outsiders	Co-producer	Broadway
2024	Illinoise	Co-producer	Broadway
2024	Death Becomes Her	Co-producer	Broadway
