= Mandira Bedi =

Indian television and film actress (born 1972)

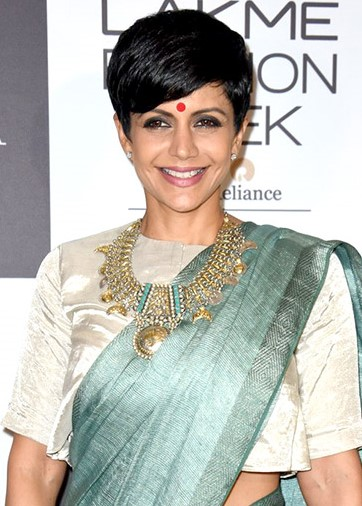
- Bedi in 2017
- Born: 15 April 1972 (age 54); Calcutta, West Bengal, India
- Occupations: Actress; television presenter; fashion designer
- Years active: 1994–present
- Spouse: Raj Kaushal (m. 1999; died 2021)
- Children: 2

Mandira Bedi (born 15 April 1972) is an Indian actress, fashion designer, and television presenter. She gained recognition by playing the title role in the 1994 television show, Shanti, which was telecast on India's national channel, Doordarshan. In 2019, she played a negative role in the movie Saaho. Bedi also appeared in many Hindi TV serials like Aurat, Dushman and Kyunki Saas Bhi Kabhi Bahu Thi. Following this, she began hosting ICC Cricket World Cups in 2003 and 2007, Champions Trophies in 2004 and 2006 and Indian Premier League for Sony Max. Bedi has been a promoter of faux leather for PETA. She debuted as a fashion designer during Lakme Fashion Week 2014 with her saree collection. In 2013, Bedi launched her signature sari store.

== Early life and education ==
Mandira Bedi was born in Calcutta to Verinder Singh and Gita Bedi. She did her schooling at Cathedral and John Connon School, Bombay and graduated from the St. Xavier's College, Bombay. Thereafter, she did her post graduation from Sophia Polytechnic College, Bombay.

== Personal life ==
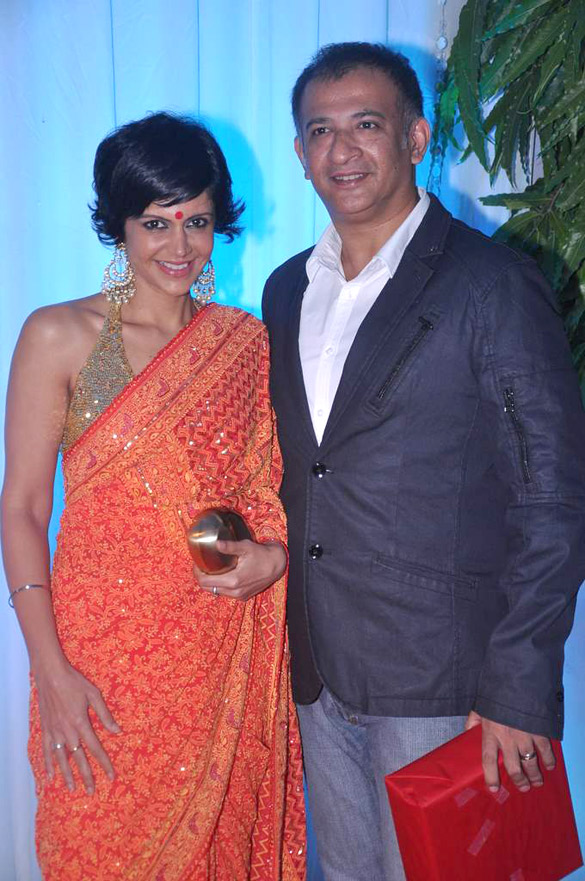
Bedi with her husband Raj Kaushal at Esha Deol's wedding reception in 2012.

She has a maternal relation with Teji Singh who is wife of Marshal of the Indian Air Force Arjan Singh. Her elder brother is a bank investor.

Bedi married Raj Kaushal on 14 February 1999. It was announced on 27 January 2011 that the couple was expecting their first child. Bedi gave birth to a boy named Vir on 19 June 2011 at the Lilavati Hospital, Mumbai. In 2013, Bedi and her husband applied to adopt a girl. On 28 July 2020, they adopted a 4-year-old and named her Tara Bedi Kaushal.

Raj Kaushal died on 30 June 2021 due to a cardiac arrest.

== Filmography ==
=== Film ===
Year	Film	Role	Language
1995	Dilwale Dulhania Le Jayenge	Preeti Singh	Hindi
2000	Badal	N/A	Hindi
2004	Shaadi Ka Laddoo	Tara	Hindi
2004	Manmadhan	Psychiatrist	Tamil
2005	Naam Gum Jaayega	Nalini	Hindi
2005	Bali	Anchal	Hindi
2005	Divorce	Renuka Joshi	Hindi
2007	Dus Kahaniyaan	Pooja	Hindi
2008	Meerabai Not Out	Meera A. Achrekar	Hindi
2009	42kms	Sanjana	Hindi
2014	O Teri	Sherry	Hindi
2017	Ittefaq	Meera Verma	Hindi
2018	Vodka Diaries	Shikha Dixit	Hindi
2019	The Tashkent Files	Indira Joseph Roy	Hindi
2019	Saaho	Kalki	Telugu/Hindi
2025	Identity	Supriya	Malayalam

=== Television ===
Year	Title	Role
1994–1998	Shanti	Shanti
1995	Aahat	
1996	Aurat	Pragati
1997–1998	Ghar Jamai	Chandni
1998–1999	Aap Ki Shanti	Host
1999	Hello Friends	Julie
2000–2001	Dushman	Sujata Prem Verma
2000	CID	Reshma
2001–2003	Kyunki Saas Bhi Kabhi Bahu Thi	Dr. Mandira Kapadia
2002	Jai Mahabharat	Rajkumari Draupadi / Maharani Draupadi
2003	Jassi Jaissi Koi Nahin	Mandira
2003	Extraaa Innings	Host/presenter
2005	Sarabhai vs Sarabhai	Cookie Sharma
2005	Fame Gurukul	Host
2005	CID: Special Bureau	Sagarika
2005	Deal Ya No Deal	Host
2005	Dial One Aur Jeeto	Host
2006	Fear Factor India	Contestant
2007–2008	Funjabbi Chak De	Host
2008	Jo Jeeta Wohi Super Star	Host
2009	Ek Se Badhkar Ek – Jalwe Sitaron Ke	Host
2009	Fear Factor: Khatron Ke Khiladi 2	Contestant
2013	Indian Idol Junior	Host
2013	24	Nikita Rai
2014	Gangs of Haseepur	Judge
2015	I Can Do That	Contestant
2016	India's Deadliest Roads	Herself
2023	The Railway Men	Rajbir Kaur

=== Web series ===
Year	Title	Role(s)	Language	Ref.
2018	Smoke	Tia	Hindi	
2019	Thinkistan	Anushka Shroff	Hinglish	
2019	Shaadi Fit	Host	Hindi	
2017	Romil & Jugal	Ahalya	Hindi	
2021	Qubool Hai 2.0	Ms. Damini Sood	Hindi	
2021	Six	Ruhana Dhulaap	Hindi	
