= Deborah Gregory =

American film producer

Deborah Gregory is an American author and film producer. She is best known as the author of the book series The Cheetah Girls. She was a co-producer of the Disney Channel Original Movies based on her books The Cheetah Girls and The Cheetah Girls 2 and an executive producer for The Cheetah Girls: One World.

== The Cheetah Girls ==
The book series is about five ambitious girls who form a singing group and achieve their dreams in the fictional "Jiggy Jungle." These girls have their own set of ethics as well as their own language, which Gregory provides a glossary for in her books. The girls pictured on the cover of the books are made up of an actual three girl singing group called Before Dark, an aspiring ballerina and a performer who was starring in "The Lion King." Gregory's inspiration for the musical group was the R&B group Destiny's Child and her own childhood aspirations of musical stardom. The novel series was adapted in a film series with four installments. There are 22 books in The Cheetah Girls series, six of which are books that tie directly to the films. In 2001, the series became the Blackboard Children's Book of the Year.

== Writing ==
Gregory has written for various magazines including Grace, More, US, and Entertainment Weekly. She has also won awards, acknowledging her contributions to "Essence Magazine" since 1992. In 1999, she penned the book series The Cheetah Girls. The books were adapted into a series of original movies by Disney Channel, starting in 2003. She also wrote the Catwalk trilogy including "Catwalk", "Catwalk: Strike a Pose", and "Catwalk: Rip the Runaway."
