= Zombiedumb =

South Korean animation series

- Hangul: 좀비덤
- RR: Jombideom
- MR: Chombidŏm
- Genre: Slapstick; Comedy; Zombies
- Country of origin: South Korea
- Original languages: Korean (theme song only); None (Non-speaking language in all episodes)
- No. of seasons: 3
- No. of episodes: 164 (60 on S1, 52 on S2, and 52 on S3)

Production
- Executive producer: Byungjun Lee
- Producer: Jungwoo Lee
- Running time: 3 minutes (1 season); 4 minutes (2 season & 3 season)
- Production company: Anyzac

Original release
- Network: KBS1, Disney Channel, Netflix
- Release: May 21, 2015 – present

Zombiedumb (or also written as Zombie Dumb, Korean: 좀비덤), is a South Korean series of animated television shorts produced by Anyzac and aired by KBS1 in South Korea. Zombiedumb was distributed by Netflix, until its removal from the platform in 2020.

The show's plot is set as a group of zombies living in a deserted place where they try to eat a young girl, who is the last human being in the city.

In other countries, Zombiedumb was also aired by Niki Kids in Ukraine, and Disney Channel in South Korea and Southeast Asia. In 2021, Anyzac (via its official Zombiedumb YouTube channel) announced that the third season will be released in 2022.

In September 2022, Anyzac announced in a blog that Season 3 will premiere on KBS1 in October: The following month, the third season premiered on October 27, 2022.

== Plot ==
Hana is the only human resident of Moon Street. She lived with 5 different zombies; each of the zombies have a unique basis. On the very first episode, they appeared from a graveyard and were affected by a magical moon, earning them different types of brains. Their names are Zombill, Zomgirl, Zomjack, Zomson, Zomkong, and Zompet (a zombified bat), all of which their names start with "Zom".

In Season 2, all characters can live in day instead of night thanks to sunscreen and more characters were added including Zombo, Zomchee, Zomko, and a dog-like zombie named Momo.

In season 3, a witch named "winkie" appears, she comes from a very distant forest and she aims to capture a human child (who is of course "hana" herself) who has children's hearts and several characters are added starting from "broo", "pumkini", and "susu" the little vampire dressed in a goth dress.

== Characters ==
In Korean; the male characters are voiced by Ko Seong-il, while female characters are voiced by Lee Myung-hee.

=== Season 1 ===
- Hana (하나): a young girl who is the only human resident of Moon Street. Originally, the zombies saw her as nothing more than brain food, but by the end of the first season, they have all come to see her as a genuine friend.
- Zombill (좀빌): a rockstar zombie that wears headphones and a jacket with a peace symbol zipper.
- Zomgirl (좀걸): an actress-based zombie that wears sunglasses.
- Zomjack (좀잭): an inventor-based zombie who lives in an underground lab with Zompet.
- Zompet (좀팻): a bat (who was affected by zombies) that lives with Zomjack.
- Zomson (좀슨): a zombie that is based on Michael Jackson. His body was wrapped in linen, like mummies.
- Zomkong (좀콩): a zombie that is named after the King Kong character. He has a voodoo doll named Mini (미니).
- Skull (스컬): Un-dead skeletons that reside on Moon St.

=== Season 2 ===
- Zombo (좀보)
- Zomchee (좀치)
- Zomko (좀꼬)
- Momo (모모)

=== Season 3 ===
- Winkie (윙키)
- Pumkiny (펌키니)
- Broo (브루)
- Susu (수수)

== List of episodes ==
=== Season 1 ===
The first 5 "quadruple features" (in reference to double features) aired between October 30 to November 28, 2015, on KBS1, while the remaining 10 aired on May 21 until July 23, 2016. Each of these comprising episodes have a 3-minute average runtime.

1. Zombie Dumbs
2. First Encounter
3. Part Time
4. Halloween Show
5. Marathon of Zombies
6. Fly me to the Moon
7. Whack the Mole
8. Show me the Eyes
9. Magic Tree
10. Fly Hana, Fly
11. Pie Fight
12. Runaway of Zompet
13. All I See is Hana
14. Resurrection
15. Nightmare
16. Love Triangle
17. Surprise Gift
18. Actress' Ring
19. Bull Fight
20. House of Horror
21. New Girl on Town
22. Pitching Machine
23. Zomkong, KingKong!
24. Hana's Music Box
25. Stink Bomb
26. Zomgirl's Birthday Party
27. Voodoo Doll
28. Rage of Skull
29. Reveal Yourself
30. Diet
31. Christmas Tree
32. Fly
33. Racing
34. Cooties
35. Underground
36. Ice Age
37. Perfect Zombie
38. Training School
39. The Witch
40. Misterious Thief
41. Giant Zombie
42. Magnet
43. Zomson's Magic Show
44. Friends of Tree
45. Let's Fish
46. For You part 1
47. For You part 2
48. Call for Rain
49. Spider Web
50. Dr. Hana
51. Flytrap
52. Hana's Birthday
53. Attack of Skull Pack
54. Kidnapping
55. Return of Zombiedumb
56. Remarkable Zompet
57. Soccer Game
58. Mummy!
59. Tenacious Skull Pack
60. We Are Friends

=== Season 2 ===
The season premiered a special broadcast on October 21, 2017, on KBS 1TV.

1. Unexpected guests
2. Claw machine game
3. Zombill's get married
4. Halloween Candy
5. Lay my egg
6. Martial arts master
7. Parcel
8. Invisibility cloak
9. Mustache
10. Knight of Zombill
11. Blackout
12. Watch out for cotton candy
13. Acupuncture
14. Fireman
15. Red Shoes
16. Vending machine
17. Toaster
18. Searching for the golden guitar
19. Boxing
20. Perfume
21. No Heart
22. Is It Real or Not?
23. I Need a Nose
24. The Lost Heart
25. VR
26. Zombill and the Pet Rooster
27. There Is the Primitive Man!
28. Ice cream Gives Me a Stomachache
29. A Clout Match
30. Diamond, My Love!
31. Zomgirl vs Zomgirl
32. Vroom, Vroom, the Motorcycle
33. She's the Cyborg
34. A Newbie Driver Zomkong
35. The Lost Button
36. Saving Zomgirl
37. Popcorn was born
38. Zombill, My Love
39. Momo Becomes a Monster
40. To Espace the Sewer
41. Please Accept My Heart
42. Zomgirl's Nightmare
43. Can We Start Our Love?
44. The Doll of Fear
45. Tell Me Your Wish
46. For Zomko's Sake
47. Superbill Rises
48. Superbill vs Momo
49. Hana Is an Alien
50. A Mysterious Chair
51. To Save Baby-skull
52. We Are One

=== Season 3 ===
The season Premiere October 27, 2022, on KBS1

1. Hana's hearts
2. Treasure map
3. Halloween cookies
4. Remote control
5. Dental doll
6. M.I.C
7. Oujia board
8. zomkong the lead
9. The wig
10. Fun Park at Midnight
11. New buddy
12. Dino in loves
13. virus
14. Hana's funeral
15. ice cream
16. zombill the baby

== Merchandising ==
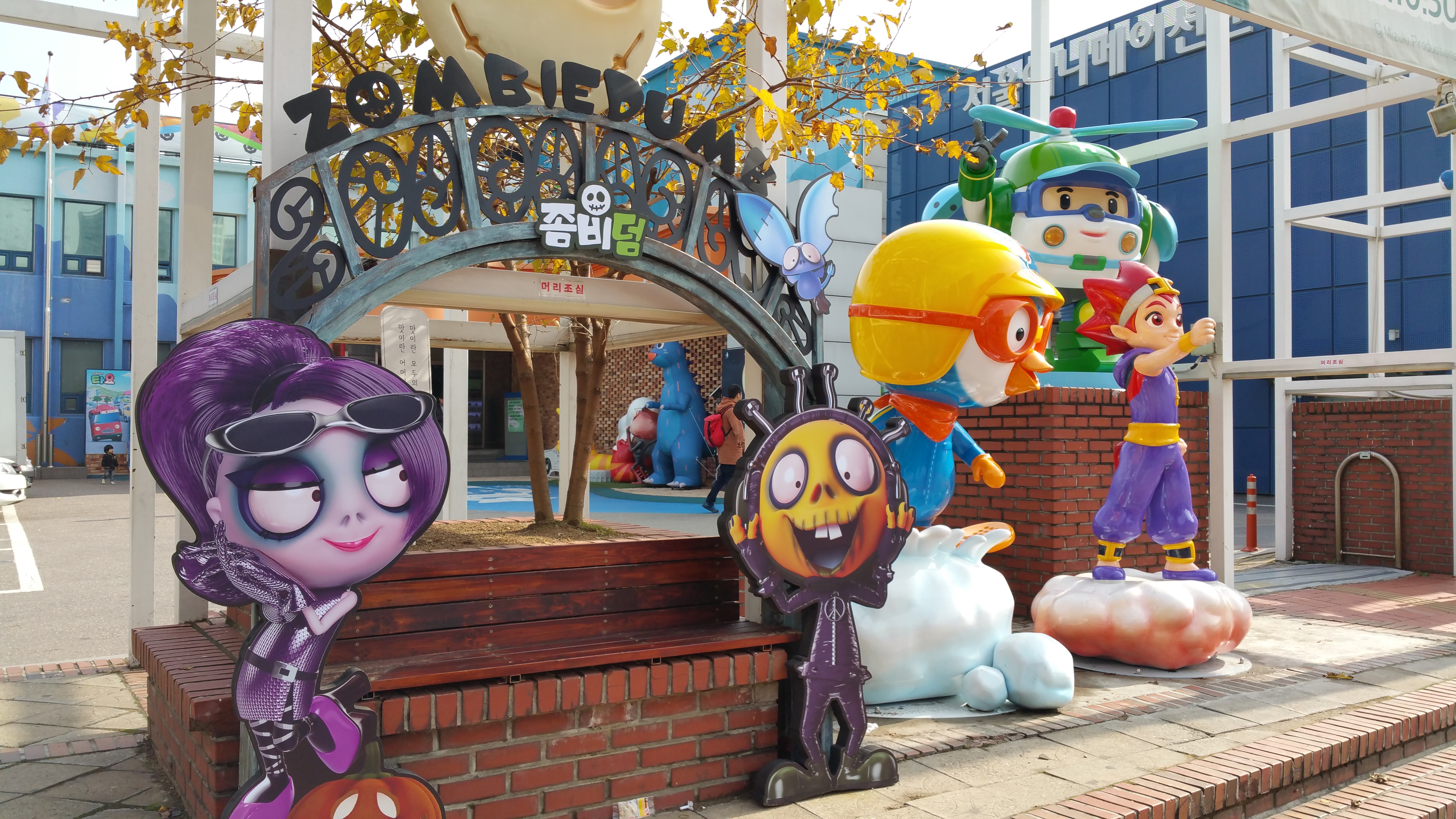
Zomgirl, Zombill, and Zompet (on the gate) are shown on this image, along with many South Korean characters. This image was captured on Seoul Animation Center.

Zombiedumb had been released into sticker books, plush toys, action figures, smartphone cases, and others. Alongside these, GS25 released more than 60 products like snacks, ice creams, and others during Halloween of 2019, based on the Zombiedumb series.

Mobirix released a mobile puzzle game entitled Zombiedumb Jelly (Korean: 좀비덤젤리) which was developed by Rainfallsoft, on April 25, 2016. Mobirix had also released a similar mobile game titled Jewelry King: Zombie Dumb.
