= Yeh Kya Ho Raha Hai? =

2002 film by Hansal Mehta

Yeh Kya Ho Raha Hai
- Directed by: Hansal Mehta
- Written by: Suparn Verma
- Produced by: Pammi Baweja; Harman Baweja
- Starring: Prashant Chianani; Aamir Ali; Deepti Daryanani; Payal Rohatgi; Samita Bangargi; Pakhi Tyrewala
- Cinematography: Chirantan Das
- Edited by: Hemal Kothari
- Music by: Shankar–Ehsaan–Loy
- Production company: Baweja Movies
- Distributed by: Shemaroo Entertainment
- Release date: 11 October 2002
- Country: India
- Language: Hindi

Yeh Kya Ho Raha Hai (transl. What Is Happening?) is a 2002 Indian Hindi-language adult comedy film. It was directed by Hansal Mehta, produced by Pammi Baweja and written by Suparn Verma. It stars Prashant Chianani, Aamir Ali Malik, Vaibhav Jalani, Yash Pandit, Deepti Daryanani, Payal Rohatgi, Samita Bangargi and Punarnava Mehta. Its basic premise is taken from the American film American Pie.

== Plot ==
Four young men join a college and develop a friendship with each other. The four also meet various young ladies and romance them throughout their semester. The question remains that will they be able to follow through with love lives after this term and will they also get passing grades at the same time?

== Cast ==
- Prashant Chianani as Ranjeet
- Aamir Ali Malik as Rahul
- Vaibhav Jalani as Bunty
- Yash Pandit as Johnny
- Deepti Daryanani as Preeti
- Payal Rohatgi as Esha
- Gajraj Rao as Bunty's father
- Samita Bangargi as Anu
- Punarnava Mehta as Stella
- Mumaith Khan (Cameo)

== Soundtracks ==
Yeh Kya Ho Raha Hai?

Studio album by Shankar–Ehsaan–Loy
- Released: 29 July 2002 (India)
- Genre: Feature film soundtrack
- Label: T-Series
- Producer: Shankar–Ehsaan–Loy

Shankar–Ehsaan–Loy chronology
Aalavandhan and Abhay (2001)	Yeh Kya Ho Raha Hai? (2002)	Ek Aur Ek Gyarah (2003)

The movie soundtrack has 6 songs composed by Shankar–Ehsaan–Loy, with lyrics by Javed Akhtar.

Track #	Song	Singer(s)	Duration
1	"Aarzoo"	Babul Supriyo, Shankar Mahadevan	6:05
2	"Kuch Hum Bhi Paagal Hain"	Gayatri Iyer, Shweta Pandit, Sunidhi Chauhan	5:18
3	"Ooh Yeh"	Instrumental	5:31
4	"Ooh Yeh"	Mahalaxmi Iyer, K.K	5:32
5	"Yaar Apne Ghar Jao"	Kunal Ganjawala, Shankar Mahadevan, Shaan	4:22
6	"Yeh Kya Ho Raha Hai"	Arnab Chakrabarty, Kunal Ganjawala, Shankar Mahadevan, Nayan	5:39
7	"Yeh Kya Ho Raha Hai" (Part 2)	Arnab Chakrabarty, Kunal Ganjawala, Shankar Mahadevan, Nayan	5:39
8	"Yeh Sama"	Sowmya Raoh, Shaan	5:56
