= Shaadi Ka Laddoo =

- DVD cover
- Directed by: Raj Kaushal
- Written by: Shashank Dabral
- Produced by: Raj Kaushal; Vicky Tejwani
- Starring: Sanjay Suri; Mandira Bedi; Aashish Chaudhary; Divya Dutta; Samita Bangargi; Sameer Malhotra; Negar Khan
- Cinematography: Amit Roy
- Edited by: Sanjib Datta
- Music by: Vishal-Shekhar
- Distributed by: RaMa Productions
- Release date: 23 April 2004
- Country: India
- Language: Hindi

Shaadi Ka Laddoo is a 2004 Indian Hindi-language comedy film directed by Raj Kaushal. The film was released on 23 April 2004.

== Plot ==
Shomu and his wife Meenu are a happily married couple with two children. Shomu decides to travel to Britain for business purposes, as well as to meet his childhood friend, Ravi Kapoor. Once in Britain, Shomu finds himself getting close to single women, and realises that he is now ready for an extra-marital affair. His friend, Ravi Kapoor, on the contrary believes that Shomu is the luckiest man on earth, as he is in love with his wife, and their marriage is rock steady. Not trusting her husband, Meenu asks a U.K. based friend to check up on him. The friend reports back that Shomu is involved with a woman named Tara. Meenu decides to go to Britain as well and catch Shomu red-handed. In the meantime, Ravi meets with a waitress named Menaka Choudhary and decides to propose marriage to her, apprehensive that she too will turn him down. The stage is all set for sparks to fly, and emotions to rise.

== Cast ==
- Sanjay Suri as Som Dutta
- Mandira Bedi as Tara
- Aashish Chaudhary as Ravi Kapoor
- Divya Dutta as Geetu
- Samita Bangargi as Meneka Choudhary
- Sameer Malhotra as Geetu's Uncle
- Negar Khan as Sheena
- John Clubb

== Soundtrack ==
Shaadi Ka Laddoo

Soundtrack album by Vishal–Shekhar
- Released: 2004
- Genre: Film soundtrack
- Length: 24:46
- Label: Universal
- Producer: Raj Kaushal; Vicky Tejwani

Vishal–Shekhar chronology
| Plan (2004) | Shaadi Ka Laddoo (2004) | Popcorn Khao! Mast Ho Jao (2004) |

| No. | Title | Singer(s) | Length |
|---|---|---|---|
| 1. | "Chal Hatt" | Sunidhi Chauhan | 04:42 |
| 2. | "Bach Ke Rehna" | Sunidhi Chauhan | 03:45 |
| 3. | "Kuchh To Ho Raha Hai" | Shaan, Mahalakshmi Iyer | 04:11 |
| 4. | "Woh Kaun Hai" | Sunidhi Chauhan | 04:35 |
| 5. | "Tum Kaho To" | Udit Narayan, Mahalakshmi Iyer | 04:20 |
| 6. | "Biwi Ka Belan" | Shaan, KK | 03:13 |
