= The Cheetah Girls: Passport to Stardom =

2008 video game

- Cover art of North American version
- Developer: Handheld Games
- Publisher: Disney Interactive Studios
- Platform: Nintendo DS
- Release: NA: August 19, 2008; PAL: December 8, 2008
- Genre: Rhythm
- Modes: Single-player, multiplayer

The Cheetah Girls: Passport to Stardom is a video game based on the movie The Cheetah Girls: One World. It was released for the Nintendo DS on August 19, 2008 in North America and on December 8 in PAL regions. It is the sequel to the 2007 video game The Cheetah Girls: Pop Star Sensations.

== Plot ==
The game takes place after the events of The Cheetah Girls: One World. The Cheetah Girls explore and perform their way through India before participating in various international competitions in Spain and New York City.

== Gameplay ==
In the game, the player plays various mini-games as Aqua, Chanel and Dorinda in order to progress. These mini-games include a rhythm game (where the player must correctly time the notes in a song by either by pressing "B", tapping the screen, or singing into the DS's microphone), a memory game (where the player must memorize the stitching on a piece of clothing and replicate the positioning), and a tile-matching game. The player can also customize the girls' clothing using in-game currency.

The game featured DGamer integration, which allowed for cooperative play and sharing of custom outfits with friends.

== Songs ==
There are a total of 12 songs in the game. All are from the 3 Cheetah Girls movies, four of which are from The Cheetah Girls: One World. 10 of these songs are sung by cover artists and 2 are sung by The Cheetah Girls. The songs can be heard even if the DS is closed.

Title	Performer	Notes
Cheetah Sisters	Cover artist	
The Party's Just Begun	Cover artist	
Dance Me If You Can	Cover artist	Original featured in The Cheetah Girls: One World (sung by The Cheetah Girls)
Cinderella	Cover artist	
Cherish the Moment	Cover artist	
Strut	Cover artist	
No Place Like Us	Cover artist	Original featured in The Cheetah Girls: One World (sung by The Cheetah Girls)
Step Up	Cover artist	
Together We Can	Cover artist	
One World	Cover artist	Original featured in The Cheetah Girls: One World (sung by The Cheetah Girls)
Cheetah Love	The Cheetah Girls	Featured in The Cheetah Girls: One World
Dig a Little Deeper	The Cheetah Girls	Featured in The Cheetah Girls: One World
