= Deepti Daryanani =

American actress

Deepti Daryanani is an actress, singer and dancer who played the role of Gita on the Disney Channel Original Movie titled The Cheetah Girls: One World. She also played Maya in the Lifetime movie Acceptance. She was also cast in Yeh Kya Ho Raha Hai?, a Bollywood remake of hit American movie American Pie.
