= Disney Channel (South Korea) =

Defunct South Korean pay television channel

- Final logo used from 2020 to September 30, 2021
- Country: South Korea
- Broadcast area: Nationwide
- Headquarters: Teheran-ro, Gangnam-gu, Seoul

Programming
- Languages: Korean (dubbing); English
- Picture format: 720p HDTV (downscaled to 16:9 480i for the SDTV feed)

Ownership
- Owner: Disney Channels Korea Ltd. (The Walt Disney Company (Korea), LLC/Disney Branded Television)
- Sister channels: Disney Junior

History
- Launched: July 1, 2011; 15 years ago
- Replaced: Disney Channel Asia (carriage in South Korea)
- Closed: September 30, 2021; 5 years ago
- Replaced by: the KIDS; Disney+ (most of its content)

Disney Channel (Korean: 디즈니채널) was a South Korean pay television channel owned by Disney Channels Korea Ltd., a joint venture between The Walt Disney Company (Korea) LLC and the Disney Branded Television unit of Disney International Operations. The South Korean version of the original United States television channel was launched on July 1, 2011, which was separated from the pan-Asian version which was available in the country with Korean subtitles from June 1, 2002, until June 30, 2011.

== History ==
On June 1, 2002, a pan-Asian feed with Korean subtitles on-screen of Disney Channel Asia was launched in the country. Later, in May 2010, Disney Channel Worldwide (which became Disney Branded Television in 2020) and SK Telecom joined to establish Television Media Korea Ltd. (which became Disney Channels Korea in 2016), a joint venture, and on July 1, 2011, it became separated from that feed and started broadcasting Korean dubbing and voice multi-service through its own channel.

On November 2, 2011, SK Telecom physically spin-off its platform business, including TV Media Korea, into its new subsidiary, SK Planet. After that, SK Planet sold all of its stock in TV Media Korea to The Walt Disney Company Korea, a Korean corporation of The Walt Disney Company, on September 30, 2015. As a result, Disney directly operated the Disney Channel and its sister channel, Disney Junior.

== Closure ==
On July 4, 2021, it was announced that Disney Channel and Disney Junior would close at the end of September and focus on Disney+ ahead of its launch in South Korea on November 12, 2021.

On August 25, 2021, MediaLog, a subsidiary of LG Uplus, a release partner of Disney+ in South Korea, acquired Disney Channel. Disney Channel and Disney Junior closed at midnight on September 30, 2021, after airing the final episode of Milo Murphy's Law and Cuby Zoo, respectively. At the same time as the closure, some television providers, including LG Uplus' U+ TV and its cable subsidiary LG HelloVision, replaced Disney Channel with MediaLog's new children's channel, The Kids (Korean: 더키즈).

== Logos ==
2011–2015

2015–2020

2020–2021

== See also ==
- Tooniverse
- Nickelodeon
- Cartoon Network
