= The Cheetah Girls (novel series) =

Novel series by Deborah Gregory

The Cheetah Girls is a book series written by Deborah Gregory. The series, which began in 1999, is about a female vocal group seeking success and fortune.

== Characters ==
The real-life R&B girl group Before Dark originally posed as three of the members on the book covers.

- Galleria "Bubbles" Garibaldi narrates "Wishing On a Star", "Woof, There it is!", "Showdown at the Okie-Dokie" and "Oops, Doggy Dog!". She is of Italian and African-American descent. Galleria is the leader of the band, and lives with her upper-class parents Dorothea and Francobollo Garibaldi in an apartment on the exclusive Upper East Side. She is not only the lead singer of the group and co-founder (along with Chanel), but also the most aggressive of the group, and always speaks her mind, a quality which occasionally gets her into trouble with others. She is the writer of all the group's songs. She has a dog named Toto. Before Dark member Mia Wright models as Galleria on Books 1–8, singer/actress Davida Williams takes over for Books 9–13. She is portrayed by Raven-Symoné in the Disney Channel Original Movies The Cheetah Girls and The Cheetah Girls 2, but she was not portrayed in The Cheetah Girls: One World.
- Chanel "Chuchie" Simmons narrates "Shop in the Name of Love", "It's Raining Benjamins", "Cuchifrita, Ballerina", and "Bow-Wow Wow!". She is Afro-Latina of Puerto Rican, Dominican, Cuban and Jamaican descent and is noted for her trademark mini-micro braids. Chanel has a flair for designer clothing (notably, she shares the last name of designer Coco Chanel and the perfume Chanel) and once charged hundreds of dollars on her mother's credit card. She is fluent in both English and Spanish. She is very body conscious, and developed somewhat of an eating disorder near the end of the book series. She and Galleria took ballet lessons until grade 6. Chanel continues to practice ballet. Her interests include hair and singing. She lives with her mother Juanita Simmons and brother, Pucci in SoHo. Brandi Stewart models as Chanel for the books. In the films, she is portrayed by Adrienne Bailon.
- Dorinda "Do Re Mi" Rogers narrates "Who's Bout To Bounce?", "Dorinda's Secret", "Dorinda Gets a Groove" and "Bring It On!". Dorinda was born to a Caucasian mother and African-American father. Dorinda describes herself as a scrambled egg due to her racial mixing. Although she is 12 years old, she attends the ninth grade at Fashion Industries High School. She is the smartest of the group, and the best dancer. She is also a foster child, and lives with foster parents Mr. & Mrs. Bosco, along with ten other children in the housing projects of Harlem, New York. She eventually locates her biological sister, Tiffany. Imani Parks models Rogers in the books. In the films, her name is changed to Dorinda Thomas and she's aged up to be the same age as the other members. She's portrayed by the Latina American (of European and Mexican descent) actress Sabrina Bryan.
- Anginette "Angie" Walker is of African-American descent, is the only member of the group not to narrate a book in the series, and the only main character cut out of the movie adaptation. She lets her twin sister, Aquanette Walker, do most of the talking, and is very sneaky. She lives with her sister and father on the Upper West Side. Her nicknames include "Angie" and "Nettie Two". She loves horror movies, and wants to be a doctor one day. She also loves gospel music. There is no Anginette in the Cheetah Girls films, because Disney couldn't find the right twin girls to play both her and Aqua and they decided to drop Angie from the movies. Before Dark member, Jeni G models as Angie in books 1–4, Sabrina Millen takes over for Books 5–13.
- Aquanette "Aqua" Walker narrates in the books "Hey, Ho, Hollywood!", "Growl Power!", "In the House with Mouse" and "Twinkle, Twinkle, Cheetah Stars". She's of African-American descent. She moved from Houston, Texas to New York City with her father when her parents separated. In the books, Aquanette and her sister are known for having the strongest voices in the group. She has a warm personality, and constantly carries hot sauce in her purse. She and Anginette Walker live on the Upper West Side. Aqua is very religious, and attends church every Sunday. Unlike her sister, she is aggressive, and speaks her mind when she is unhappy. Her interests include horror movies, animals, and one day becoming a doctor. She has three pets: two guinea pigs and a dog. Before Dark member Arike Rice models as Aqua for Books 1–4, then model/actress Sonya Millen for books 5–13. For the first movie, Singer Solange Knowles was originally cast to portray Aqua but would drop out before filming due to scheduling conflicts and was replaced by Bailon's fellow 3LW group member, Kiely Williams who would portray Walker for the remainder of the franchise.

== Novels ==
1999

- The Cheetah Girls #01: Wishing on a Star
- The Cheetah Girls #02: Shop in the Name of Love
- The Cheetah Girls #03: Who's 'Bout to Bounce?
- The Cheetah Girls #04: Hey, Ho, Hollywood!

2000

- The Cheetah Girls #05: Woof, There It Is
- The Cheetah Girls #06: It's Raining Benjamins
- The Cheetah Girls #07: Dorinda's Secret
- The Cheetah Girls #08: Growl Power

2001

- The Cheetah Girls #09: Showdown at the Okie-Dokie
- The Cheetah Girls #10: Cuchifrita, Ballerina
- The Cheetah Girls #11: Dorinda Gets a Groove
- The Cheetah Girls #12: In the House With Mouse!

2002

- The Cheetah Girls #13: Oops, Doggy Dog!

2005

- The Cheetah Girls #14: Bow-Wow Wow!
- The Cheetah Girls #15: Bring It On!
- The Cheetah Girls #16: Twinkle, Twinkle, Cheetah Stars

== Film adaptations ==
In the book series, there are five Cheetah Girls, but in the first film adaption and its sequel, there are only four, while in the third film installment, there are only three.
