= The Cheetah Girls: One World =

2008 American musical television film

- Promotional poster
- Based on: The Cheetah Girls by Deborah Gregory
- Screenplay by: Dan Berendsen; Nisha Ganatra; Jen Small
- Story by: Dan Berendsen
- Directed by: Paul Hoen
- Starring: Adrienne Bailon; Sabrina Bryan; Kiely Williams; Roshan Seth; Michael Steger; Kunal Sharma; Deepti Daryanani; Rupak Ginn; Vinod Nagpal
- Music by: David Lawrence
- Country of origin: United States
- Original language: English

Production
- Producers: Mitch Engel; Debra Martin Chase
- Cinematography: Donald Duncan
- Editor: Girish Bhargava
- Running time: 84 minutes
- Production companies: Khussro Films; Martin Chase Productions

Original release
- Network: Disney Channel
- Release: August 22, 2008

Related
- The Cheetah Girls; The Cheetah Girls 2 The Cheetah Girls: Next Gen

The Cheetah Girls: One World (also known as The Cheetah Girls 3 or The Cheetah Girls 3: One World) is a 2008 American musical film directed by Paul Hoen. It is the sequel to The Cheetah Girls 2 (2006). The film premiered on Disney Channel on August 22, 2008. It is the third film of The Cheetah Girls franchise, the only film without Raven-Symoné and the last film to star Kiely Williams.

== Plot ==
With Galleria away at Cambridge, Chanel, Dorinda, and Aqua are left as a trio and are cast in the lavish Bollywood movie Namaste Bombay. The Cheetah Girls travel across the globe to India where they meet Rahim, the man cast as the lead, whom they realize is attractive, yet somewhat clumsy. After meeting the movie's choreographer, Gita, a dance battle erupts between the girls and Gita and her backup dancers ("Dance Me If You Can"). They subsequently discover that the musical's director, Vikram "Vik", must choose only one Cheetah for the role as the budget is only enough for one star.

When it becomes apparent that they must travel home, they are upset, until realizing they may each try out for the lead. Though they all make a promise to be fair in the competition, situations arise in which each member becomes jealous of the others' specific talents. Chanel befriends Vik, Dorinda befriends Rahim, and Aqua befriends a boy she has been in contact with since before leaving America, Amar. Each girl is led to believe the producer of the film, Khamal, Vik's uncle, will choose her after the audition. Chanel is told because she is the better singer, she will receive the role, while Dorinda is promised the role as she is the best dancer, while Aqua is convinced the coveted role will be hers as she is the best actress. The three Cheetahs audition against one another ("I'm The One") with Chanel being awarded the role, which she later refuses after realizing, along with the other Cheetahs, that friendship and unity are more important than furthering their individual careers ("No Place like Us").

After refusing the role, Chanel and the girls set out to convince Khamal to award Gita as the lead, to which he reluctantly agrees. The film ends with a scene from Namaste Bombay in which the Cheetahs sing and dance the film's titular song, "One World".

== Cast ==
- Adrienne Bailon as Chanel "Chuchie" Simmons, the leader of The Cheetah Girls
- Sabrina Bryan as Dorinda "Do" Thomas, a member of The Cheetah Girls
- Kiely Williams as Aquanette "Aqua" Walker, a member of The Cheetah Girls.
- Roshan Seth as Uncle Kamal Bhatia, Vik's uncle, and the producer of Namaste Bombay.
- Michael Steger as Vikram Bhatia, Kamal's nephew and the director of Namaste Bombay.
- Kunal Sharma as Amar, a man that Aqua befriends, and has been in contact with since before leaving America
- Deepti Daryanani as Gita, the choreographer for Namaste Bombay.
- Rupak Ginn as Rahim Khan, the lead actor in Namaste Bombay.
- Vinod Nagpal as Swami Ji

== Production ==
In early 2007, Disney Channel announced the film with the plot involving the Cheetah Girls going to India to star in a Bollywood production. Like The Cheetah Girls 2, it was filmed on location in a foreign country, for a three-month period in India. Bailon was doing research for the film during the filming. Although Bailon said in March that "all of the original cast will be back", Raven-Symoné later confirmed in August that she would not be returning for this film due to "catfights" and "territorial issues" behind the scenes of the second film. Nearly a decade later, Symoné would reveal she did not appear in the third film due to feeling "excluded" and "ostracized" during production of The Cheetah Girls 2.

The film was shot on location in Udaipur and Mumbai in India from January to April 2008. Like High School Musical 2, Disney Channel featured a "play your part" role, where viewers and fans could choose elements of the film through the website. This took place from December 31, 2007 to February 1, 2008.

== Soundtrack ==
The soundtrack was released on August 19, 2008. The soundtrack contains elements of both hip hop and Indian music.

- "Cheetah Love" by The Cheetah Girls
- "Dig a Little Deeper" by The Cheetah Girls
- "Dance Me If You Can" by The Cheetah Girls, and Deepti Daryanani
- "Fly Away" by The Cheetah Girls
- "Stand Up" by Adrienne Bailon
- "What If" by Adrienne Bailon
- "I'm the One" by The Cheetah Girls, Michael Steger, Rupak Ginn, and Kunal Sharma
- "No Place Like Us" by The Cheetah Girls
- "One World" by The Cheetah Girls, Deepti Daryanani, and Rupak Ginn
- "Feels Like Love" by The Cheetah Girls, Deepti Daryanani, Michael Steger, Rupak Ginn, and Kunal Sharma (featured on the DVD/Blu-ray disc on the extended edition)
- "Crazy on the Dance Floor" by Sabrina Bryan
- "Circle Game" by Kiely Williams

== Reception ==
The film premiered to over 6.2 million viewers, and reached 7 million viewers in its final half hour. In the UK, its premiere night scored 412,000 on Disney Channel UK, making it #1 of the week, and received 182,000 on Disney Channel UK +1, also #1 on that channel for the week, totalling 594,000.

== Home media ==
The "Extended Music Edition" DVD and Blu-ray Disc of The Cheetah Girls: One World, was released on December 16, 2008 in the United States. It includes an exclusive music sequence titled "Feels Like Love", as well as a downloadable exclusive remixed version of "Feels Like Love". It also featured a "Rock-Along" mode, "Cheetah Spots", and an alternate version of the movie with pop-up fun facts and music videos. The Region 2 DVD was released on March 16, 2009.
