= Alar Kivilo =

Canadian-Estonian cinematographer (born 1953)

Alar Kivilo (born 17 February 1953 in Montréal, Canada) is a Canadian-Estonian cinematographer.

== Life and career ==
He has graduated from York University in Toronto, where he studied film.

In 1997, he moved to the USA.

He is an honorary member of the Estonian Society of Cinematographers.

== Filmography ==
=== Short film ===
Year	Title	Director	Notes
1974	The Estonians: For the Record	Tiina Soomet	
1981	The Olden Days Coat	Bruce Pittman	TV short
1983	Boys and Girls	Don McBrearty	
1994	The Passion of John Ruskin	Alex Chapple	
2013	Through Ice and Time	Himself	Also writer
2018	The Wedding Singer's Daughter	Haifaa al-Mansour	

=== Feature film ===
Year	Title	Director
1986	Vincent Price's Dracula	John Muller
1988	Da	Matt Clark
1998	A Simple Plan	Sam Raimi
2000	Frequency	Gregory Hoblit
2001	The Glass House	Daniel Sackheim
2002	Hart's War	Gregory Hoblit
2005	Aurora Borealis	James C.E. Burke
2005	The Ice Harvest	Harold Ramis
2006	The Lake House	Alejandro Agresti
2007	The Lookout	Scott Frank
2009	Year One	Harold Ramis
2009	The Blind Side	John Lee Hancock
2011	Bad Teacher	Jake Kasdan
2012	The Lucky One	Scott Hicks
2016	The Choice	Ross Katz
2016	Fallen	Scott Hicks
2018	The Land of Steady Habits	Nicole Holofcener
2018	Nappily Ever After	Haifaa al-Mansour
2020	The Broken Hearts Gallery	Natalie Krinsky
2022	Space Oddity	Kyra Sedgwick

=== Television ===
TV movies

Year	Title	Director
1982	984: Prisoner of the Future	Tibor Takács
1982	David	Bruce Pittman
1983	Copper Mountain	David Mitchell
1994	Heads	Paul Shapiro
1994	Mary Silliman's War	Stephen Surjik
1994	Avalanche	Paul Shapiro
1995	Choices of the Heart: The Margaret Sanger Story	Paul Shapiro
1995	Young at Heart	Allan Arkush
1995	Friends at Last	John David Coles
1996	Gotti	Robert Harmon
1996	The Legend of Earl 'The Goat' Manigault	Eriq La Salle
1997	Weapons of Mass Distraction	Stephen Surjik
1999	Deep in My Heart	Anita W. Addison
1999	Black and Blue	Paul Shapiro
2003	Normal	Jane Anderson
2004	NYPD 2069	Gregory Hoblit
2009	Taking Chance	Ross Katz
2017	Story of a Girl	Kyra Sedgwick

TV series

Year	Title	Director	Notes
1995	The Invaders	Paul Shapiro	Miniseries
2006	Windfall	David Semel	Episode "Pilot"
2025	Foundation	Christopher J. Byrne	3 episodes

== Awards ==
- 1995 Gemini Award nomination for "Heads"
- 1997 Emmy Award nomination for "Gotti"
