= Redemption: The Stan Tookie Williams Story =

2004 television film directed by Vondie Curtis-Hall

- DVD cover
- Genre: Biographical drama; Crime drama
- Written by: J.T. Allen
- Directed by: Vondie Curtis-Hall
- Starring: Jamie Foxx; Lynn Whitfield; Lee Thompson Young; CCH Pounder
- Music by: Terence Blanchard
- Country of origin: United States
- Original language: English

Production
- Executive producers: Jamie King; Jon Katzman; Marcus King; Jamie Foxx; Van Spurgeon; Rudy Langlais
- Producer: Sue Bugden
- Cinematography: David Greene
- Editor: Terilyn A. Shropshire
- Running time: 95 minutes
- Production companies: FX Networks; Fox Television Studios

Original release
- Network: FX
- Release: January 21, 2004

Redemption: The Stan Tookie Williams Story is a 2004 American biographical crime drama television film directed by Vondie Curtis-Hall, written by J.T. Allen, and starring Jamie Foxx, Lynn Whitfield, Lee Thompson Young and CCH Pounder. The film premiered at the 2004 Sundance Film Festival, and was later broadcast on the FX network on April 11, 2004.

The film deals with the life of Stanley Tookie Williams (Foxx), the co-founding member of the Crips street gang. Along with showing his life in the streets and his time in San Quentin State Prison, it shows the work Williams did while incarcerated to help decrease gang violence in the world. The film was shot in 2003 while Williams was still imprisoned. On December 13, 2005, Williams was executed by lethal injection.

== Cast ==
- Jamie Foxx as Stanley Tookie Williams
  - Kahmaara Armatrading as Stan Williams (9–12)
  - Brenden Jefferson as young Stan Williams
- Lynn Whitfield as Barbara Becnel
- Lee Thompson Young as Charles Becnel
- Brenda Bazinet as Barbara's Agent
- Wes Williams as Tony Bogard
- Greg Ellwand as Prison Chief
- CCH Pounder as Winnie Mandela
- Barbara Barnes-Hopkins as Mrs. Williams
- Joseph Pierre as Raymond Washington
- Vibert Cobham as Buddha
- Aaron Meeks as Banger #1
- Rosemary Dunsmore as Warden Woodford
- Shane Daly as Associate Warden Scanlon
- Martin Roach as Guard Morales
- Dan Duran as Campus Reporter
- Liz West as Publisher #3
- Arnold Pinnock as Guard #1
- Tommy Chang as Junior Guard

== Production ==
=== Development ===
During Williams' incarceration, he began co-writing a series of books with Barbara Becnel for young children about the dangers of gang violence. The first volumes of these books were published in 1996 by a small New York company. A quote from one of books which focuses on how gangs abuse power states, "... As a teenager, I didn't know the meaning of power. I thought that by using violence to scare people, I was proving that I had a lot of power. But when you use your power to make someone do something they don't want to do, or to hurt someone, you are abusing your power."

The books generated enough publicity that in 2000, a member of Switzerland's national parliament nominated Williams for the Nobel Prize. Shortly after, a biopic of Williams was pitched to FX. Producer Rudy Langlais signed on to develop the project, saying Williams "struck [him] as a man in the midst of sort of reinventing himself...wrestling with past and future, becoming aware he is one step away from extinction." The production took on a sense of "emotional urgency" in September 2002 when the federal appeals court rejected Williams' appeal against the death penalty and suggested his sentence be reduced to life in prison instead.

=== Filming ===
The film was shot in 38 days during July and August 2003. All of the filming took place in Toronto, except for one full day in South Central Los Angeles and one half-day of exteriors in San Francisco. A scheduling crisis emerged as Foxx had signed on to the film Collateral, which was due to begin filming soon. Though Foxx had the option of dropping out of Redemption, he chose to stay on and the shooting schedule was compressed to accommodate him.

Foxx spent many hours visiting with Williams at San Quentin and continued to correspond with him after filming ended. Said Foxx, "I gave him my word I was going to take care of this story. I had to do this project....I know I'm going to be successful, but with projects like this it's not the money you make, it's having the chance to touch, to get a chance to inspire. Especially for black folks....If we can get some education about some of the things we go through, it's worth more than any amount of money."

== Release ==
The film premiered at the Sundance Film Festival on January 21, 2004. It was later aired on the FX cable network on April 11, 2004.

== Critical reception ==
While Jamie Foxx's performance was lauded, with The New York Times' Alessandra Stanley saying he plays Williams "with iron-cast reserve, quietly conveying the authoritative presence of the man", critics said the story was limited by its made-for-TV format. Stanley said the film "is not interested in exploring uncomfortable, contradictory truths; it trafficks in simplistic myths and misplaced martyrdom."

=== Accolades ===
The film was the winner of five Black Reel Awards in the Network/Cable Television category, including Best Actor and Best Actress for Foxx and Lynn Whitfield, Best Supporting Actress for CCH Pounder, Best Director for Vondie Curtis-Hall, and Best Screenplay by J.T. Allen. Allen was nominated for a Writers Guild of America Award, and Foxx and Whitfield also won NAACP Image Awards for their performances. The film was awarded Best Television Film and Best Actor in a Miniseries or Television Film by the Satellite Awards.

At the 20th Independent Spirit Awards, Foxx was nominated for Best Male Lead and David Greene was nominated for Best Cinematography. Foxx also garnered nominations from the Screen Actors Guild Awards and the Golden Globe Awards.
