= Kilroy was here (disambiguation) =

Kilroy was here is an American expression that became popular during World War II, typically seen in graffiti.

Kilroy Was Here may also refer to:

- Kilroy Was Here (1947 film), an American comedy film
- Kilroy was Here, a song from the 1968 album Move by The Move
- Kilroy Was Here (album), a 1983 album by Styx
- Kilroy Was Here (1983 film), a short film made to tie in with the Styx album
- Killroy Was Here (2022 film), an American horror anthology film based on the graffiti phenomenon
