= Stanley Williams =

Co-founder of the Crips gang (1953–2005)

Tookie Williams
- Williams' 2000 mugshot
- Born: Stanley Tookie Williams III; December 29, 1953; New Orleans, Louisiana, U.S.
- Died: December 13, 2005 (aged 51); San Quentin State Prison, San Quentin, California, U.S.
- Occupation: Author
- Spouse: Bonnie Williams-Taylor (m. 1981)
- Children: 3
- Status: Executed by lethal injection
- Allegiance: West Side Crips
- Convictions: First degree murder with special circumstances (4 counts); Robbery (2 counts)
- Penalty: Death

Details
- Victims: 4
- Span of crimes: February 28 – March 7, 1979
- Country: United States
- State: California
- Weapon: 12-gauge shotgun
- Website: tookie.com (archived)

Stanley Tookie Williams III (December 29, 1953 – December 13, 2005) was an American gangster who co-founded and led the Crips gang in Los Angeles. He and Raymond Washington formed an alliance in 1969 that established the Crips as Los Angeles' first major African-American street gang. During the 1970s, Williams was the de facto leader of the Crips and the prominent crime boss in South Los Angeles.

Williams's activities with the Crips ended in 1979 when he was arrested for the murder of four people during two robberies. Convicted of the murders in 1981 and sentenced to death, he spent over two decades on death row until he was executed by lethal injection in 2005. The highly publicized trial of Williams and extensive appeals for clemency sparked debate on the status of the death penalty in California.

== Early years ==
Williams was born on December 29, 1953, in New Orleans, Louisiana. He was christened Stanley Tookie Williams III but was usually called by his middle name Tookie (pronounced /ˈtʊki/). His father abandoned the family when Williams was one year old. In 1959, Williams moved with his mother, Louisiana Williams, to Los Angeles, California, and settled in the city's South Central area.

As Williams' mother worked several jobs to support them, Williams was a latchkey kid and often engaged in mischief on the streets. He recalled that, as a child, he would make some money from "the hustlers": "These hustlers would bet on just about anything—even who could spit, urinate, or throw a rock the farthest. I have witnessed cockfights, cricket fights, fish fights, and pay-per-view street fights among individuals between six and fifty years of age. Older hustlers would bet on children to fight".

Williams said that he was often paid a couple dollars after dogfights to take care of the injured dogs. He was also occasionally paid to participate in these street fights as a teenager and earned his reputation as a vicious street fighter in South Central's West Side afterwards. This, alongside a host of other factors that made him "intimidating", contributed to his expulsion from George Washington Preparatory High School and denied entry by several other high schools in the South Central area.

Williams was sent to Los Padrinos and then to Central Juvenile Hall for the first time after the formation of the Crips, charged with a robbery at Clifton's restaurant which he denied participating in.

== Gang activity ==
In the late 1960s, juvenile crime increased in South Central as older gangs disbanded to join the Black Power Movement, most notably as part of the Black Panther Party, initially to protect black people from police brutality and corruption in the Los Angeles Police Department. Increasingly violent youth gangs formed in their place, which Williams initially despised as predatory. Because of his viciousness and willingness to fight older youths, Williams earned the respect of many gangsters on the West Side. These gangs were mostly small-time neighborhood cliques that operated independently from each other and therefore leadership was not chosen but determined informally. At age fifteen, Williams was invited into a small West Side clique after he befriended a local teenager, Donald "Doc/Sweetback" Archie. Williams soon earned the clique's respect after beating up one of their members for insulting his mother. Williams became the unofficial leader of this clique as his violent reputation began to spread across South Central.

In 1969, aged 15, Williams was arrested in Inglewood for car theft and was sent to the Los Padrinos Juvenile Hall in Downey. While doing time at the detention center, Williams was introduced to Olympic weightlifting by the facility's gym coach, which would spark an interest in bodybuilding. By his release from custody in early 1971, aged 17, Williams was physically bigger and stronger. According to Williams, upon his release from custody the review board asked him what he planned to do after being released, to which he replied "being the leader of the biggest gang in the world."

Shortly after his release from prison, Williams was approached by Raymond Washington at Washington Preparatory High School after hearing of Williams through a mutual friend of both young men. The friend had informed Washington of Williams' toughness and his willingness to fight members of larger, more established street gangs such as the L.A. Brims and the Chain Gang. According to Williams' account of the meeting, what struck him about Washington was that, besides being incredibly muscular, he and his cohort were dressed similar to Williams and his clique, wearing leather jackets with starched Levi's jeans and suspenders. Washington was from South Central's East Side, where he was a prominent gangster similar to Williams, and proposed they use their influence in their respective regions to form the larger Crips street gang. The purpose for creating the gang initially was to eliminate all street gangs and create a "bull force" neighborhood watch in South Central. Williams said: "We started out—at least my intent was to, in a sense, address all of the so-called neighboring gangs in the area and to put, in a sense—I thought 'I can cleanse the neighborhood of all these, you know, marauding gangs.' But I was totally wrong. And eventually, we morphed into the monster we were addressing."

At the time of the Crips' initial formation there were only three Crip sets: Washington's East Side Crips (later called East Coast Crips), Williams' West Side Crips (later the Eight Tray Gangster Crips), and the Compton Crips, led by a teenager named Mac Thomas. Williams formed the West Side Crips using his own influence, having befriended many clique leaders and street thugs on the West Side. Washington, Williams and Thomas went on an aggressive and violent recruitment campaign throughout the black ghettos of Los Angeles, where they challenged the leaders of other gangs to one-on-one street fights. This process resulted in most gangs agreeing to join the Crips, and they were converted from small independent cliques into subgroups (sets) of a gang within the larger gang. The Crips quickly became the biggest street gang in South Central by both numbers and territory, however, numerous gangs still resisted losing their independence. These hold-out gangs formed a similar alliance to combat the Crips' influence, branding themselves as the Bloods, and would become their fiercest rivals. Williams' former rivals, the L.A. Brims and the Chain Gang, joined the Blood alliance and became The Brims and The Inglewood Family Bloods, respectively.

As leader of the West Side Crips, Williams became the archetype of the new wave of Los Angeles gang members that would engage in random acts of violence against rival gang members and innocent people alike. Williams and his best friend, Curtis "Buddha" Morrow, would noticeably participate in these activities, striking fear into both street criminals and the residents of South Central, Watts, Inglewood, and Compton. Williams' violent acts became legendary in southern Los Angeles' criminal underworld as on numerous occasions criminal charges brought against him ended in disarray, and prosecutors were unable to convict him due to lack of evidence.

== Crips leader ==
Soon after the foundation of the Crips, other leaders were either murdered or incarcerated and Williams became regarded as the de facto leader. In 1974, Raymond Washington was arrested for 2nd degree robbery and served two years in prison in Tracy. Raymond was soon murdered after his release from prison. On February 23, 1973, Curtis "Buddha" Morrow was shot to death in South Central following a petty argument. Mac Thomas was murdered under mysterious circumstances in the mid-1970s. Williams began to live an ironic double life in which he worked as an anti-gang youth counselor in Compton while also serving as the overboss for one of the largest gangs in Los Angeles. Williams would work as a counselor and study sociology at Compton College during working hours, then spend his free time participating in numerous violent attacks against the Bloods.

In 1976, Williams was wounded in a drive-by shooting while sitting on the porch of his house in Compton. The shooting was committed by members of the Bloods, who shot at Williams from their car as he was letting his dog out for a walk in the evening. Attempting to avoid getting hit, Williams dove to the ground from the porch, but was shot in both of his legs. Williams was told by doctors that he would never walk again, but after a nearly year-long process of physical rehabilitation and an intense workout regimen, he ultimately regained his ability to walk. After the shooting, Williams re-developed a substance abuse problem when he began smoking PCP. Williams had begun dabbling in street drugs around the age of twelve, and as a preteen befriended a neighborhood pimp who, in return for performing errands for him, would reward Williams with money and drugs, particularly Quaaludes, barbiturates (then known as "Red Devils") or marijuana. Williams' personal life began to unravel; his maternal grandmother, with whom he was very close, died in 1976. He lost his counseling job in 1977 after being implicated in a robbery that was committed by two youths from a group home that Williams supervised. He was denied an opportunity to compete in an amateur bodybuilding contest after it was discovered that he was a gang leader (Williams would later appear on the popular 1970s NBC game show The Gong Show, performing a posedown routine). Eventually his gangster lifestyle began to take a mental toll on him, which included a brief stay in the psychiatric ward of a hospital after Williams experienced a bad trip while high on PCP. With each of these setbacks Williams increasingly found himself using PCP and supported his drug habit by intimidating and robbing drug dealers in South Central.

== Murder convictions ==
In 1981, Williams was convicted of four counts of murder committed in two of three separate incidents. He always maintained his innocence, though subsequent court reviews concluded that there was no compelling reason to grant him a retrial. The prosecution stated that Williams met with a man identified in court documents only as "Darryl" late on Tuesday evening, February 28, 1979.

Williams introduced Darryl to friends of his, Alfred "Blackie" Coward and to Bernard "Whitie" Trudeau, and a short time after the initial meeting, Darryl, driving a brown station wagon and accompanied by Williams and Coward drove to the home of James Garret. Williams frequently stayed and kept some possessions at Garret's home, including a 12-gauge shotgun, and after about 10 minutes inside, Williams returned with the shotgun. He, Darryl and Coward then went to the home of Tony Sims in Pomona, where they discussed possible locations to obtain money through robbery.

Later on, all three men went to another residence, where Williams left the others and returned with a .22-caliber pistol. With the gun, he and Darryl entered the station wagon, Coward and Sims entered another vehicle, and then embarked on the freeway. Both vehicles exited the freeway at California State Route 72 (Whittier Boulevard). The first incident occurred at a nearby Stop-N-Go supermarket, where Darryl and Sims, at the request of Williams, entered the store with the apparent intention of robbing it. Darryl was carrying the .22 pistol that Williams had deposited in the station wagon earlier, and also had a rifle in the trunk of the car, along with two semi-automatic handguns. The clerk at the Stop-N-Go market, Johnny Garcia, had just finished mopping the floor when he observed a station wagon and the four men at the door to the market. Two of the men entered the market and one of the men went down an aisle, while the other approached Garcia asking for a cigarette. Garcia gave the man a cigarette and lit it for him. After approximately three to four minutes, the men left the market without carrying out the planned robbery.

The prosecution stated that next Coward and Sims followed Williams and Darryl to the 7-Eleven market located at 10437 Whittier Boulevard in Whittier. The store clerk, 26-year-old Albert Lewis Owens, was sweeping the store's parking lot at 7:42 p.m. when Darryl and Sims entered the 7-Eleven. Owens put the broom and dustpan he was using on the hood of his car and entered the store to serve them, and was followed in by Williams and Coward. As Darryl and Sims walked to the counter area to take money from the cash register, Williams walked behind Owens, pulled the shotgun from under his jacket and told Owens to "shut up and keep walking".

While pointing the shotgun at Owens' back, Williams directed him to a back storage room and ordered him to lie down. Coward said that he next heard the sound of a round being chambered into the shotgun, then heard a shot and glass breaking, followed by two more shots. Williams had shot at a security monitor and then killed Owens, shooting him twice in the back at point-blank range as he lay prone on the storage room floor.

The next incident occurred at the Brookhaven Motel located at 10411 South Vermont Avenue in South Central Los Angeles, which was run by 65-year-old Tsai-Shai Yang and his wife, 62-year old Yi-Chen Lin, their daughter, 43-year-old Yen-Yi Yang, and their son, Robert. The Yangs were immigrants from Taiwan, and Yen-Yi had recently joined them in the United States to run the hotel. According to the prosecutors, at approximately 5:00 a.m. on March 11, 1979, Williams entered the Brookhaven Motel lobby and then broke down the door that led to the private office. Inside the office, Williams shot Tsai-Shai, Yi-Chen and Yen-Yi. All would die of the injuries they sustained. He then emptied the cash register and fled the scene. Robert, asleep with his wife in their bedroom at the motel, was awakened by the sound of somebody breaking down the door to the motel's office. Shortly thereafter he heard a female scream, followed by gunshots. Robert entered the motel office and found that his mother, his sister, and his father had all been shot, and the cash register was empty. The forensic pathologist testified that Tsai-Shai suffered two close range shotgun wounds, one to his left arm and abdomen, and one to the lower left chest. Yi-Chen also received two close range wounds, one to the tailbone, and the other to the front of the abdomen, entering at the navel. Yen-Yi was shot once in the upper left face area at a distance of a few feet. Witnesses testified that Williams referred to the victims in conversations with friends as "Buddha-heads".

== Trial ==
Williams was convicted in 1981 of all four murders with aggravating circumstances on each count of felony murder (robbery) as well as multiple murder in the case of the Brookhaven event. The jury also convicted him of robbery in both cases, and found that he personally used a firearm in the commission of the crimes. The jury returned a guilty verdict, and the judge sentenced him to death.

From the beginning of his sentence, Williams maintained his innocence regarding the four murders, alleging prosecutorial misconduct, exclusion of exculpatory evidence, ineffective assistance of counsel, biased jury selection, and the misuse of jailhouse and government informants. Williams claimed that the police found "not a shred of tangible evidence, no fingerprints, no crime scenes of bloody boot prints. They didn't match my boots, nor eyewitnesses. Even the shotgun shells found conveniently at each crime scene didn't match the shotgun shells that I owned." However, the prosecution's firearms expert, a sheriff's deputy, testified during trial that the shotgun shell recovered from the Brookhaven Motel crime scene matched test shells from the shotgun owned by Stanley Williams. No second examiner verified his findings, and the defense claimed this expert's methodology was "junk science at best". Williams' gun was found in the home of a couple with whom he occasionally stayed. According to the District Attorney, the husband was undergoing sentencing for receiving stolen property and tried for extortion. Williams' lawyers have claimed that the District Attorney quashed a murder investigation in exchange for their testimony. The two shells recovered from the 7-Eleven crime scene were consistent with shells fired from this gun, with no exclusionary markings. The shell recovered from the Brookhaven Motel crime scene was conclusively matched to Williams' weapon "to the exclusion of all other firearms."

Critics claim that although he renounced gangs and apologized for his role in co-founding the Crips, Williams continued to associate with Crips members in prison. However, when contacted about Williams' alleged ongoing gang activity, Los Angeles Police Department spokeswoman April Harding said there was no evidence of his gang leadership. Opponents also pointed out that he received a significant amount of money from outside sources. They stated that people who appreciate Williams' work sent him money. "It's as simple as that," said Williams' spokeswoman Barbara Becnel.

The prosecution had removed three black people from serving as jurors in Williams' trial. Williams' lawyers claimed that he was convicted by a jury that had no African-Americans, one Latino, one Filipino-American, and 10 White Americans. The District Attorney provided proof, however, in the form of a death certificate and the affidavit of another juror, that juror #12, William James McLurkin, was black. The defense responded that, contrary to the affidavit, McLurkin did not appear black. They maintain that the trial record indicates that "none of the lawyers, and particularly the prosecutor, thought Mr. McLurkin was black", according to additional evidence in a November 2005 petition for clemency. According to the clemency petition, in his closing arguments, prosecuting District Attorney Robert Martin described Williams as a "Bengal tiger in captivity in a zoo" and said that the jury needed to imagine him in his natural "habitat", which was like "going into the back country, into the hinterlands." In a radio interview, Martin insisted that the analogy was not meant to be racial, and instead was a metaphor to the fact that Williams appeared in court dressed in business attire much like an animal in a zoo appears more docile than it would be in the wild. In the Court of Appeal summary of the case, Williams stated that various jurors misconstrued as a threat a question that he asked defense counsel at the close of the guilt phase. The trial record shows that after the jurors returned their guilty verdicts, Williams said, "Sons of bitches" in a voice sufficiently loud that the court reporter included it in the trial transcript. On the day that the jury began its penalty-phase deliberations, an alternate juror reported to the bailiff that he was going to get all of them. Three separate alternate jurors denied hearing Williams make such a comment to the judge.

Williams became inmate CDC# C29300 at San Quentin State Prison in northern California, and spent 6 years in solitary confinement in the late 1980s for multiple assaults on guards and fellow inmates. According to a classification report found on page 8 of filings by his lawyers during the clemency proceedings dated August 5, 2004, Williams had no violations since that time.

In October 1988, Williams was stabbed in the neck and seriously injured by Tiequon Cox in San Quentin State Prison.

== Appeals ==
Williams appealed his conviction in the state courts and filed a petition in the federal courts for habeas corpus relief. The State courts affirmed the conviction, and the lower federal court denied the habeas corpus petition. In 2001, the United States Court of Appeals for the Ninth Circuit heard Williams' appeal from the lower federal court, and the appellate court denied Williams' appeal in 2002, but noted that the federal courts were not his only forum for relief and that he could request clemency from the Governor of California. In late 2005, a campaign began to urge Governor Arnold Schwarzenegger to grant clemency for Williams in consideration of his work as an anti-gang activist, with thousands of people signing online petitions calling for Schwarzenegger to commute the death sentence. In early November 2005, Williams' attorneys filed his formal petition for executive clemency, as well as a motion to obtain new evidence. (See below for the full text of the documents filed in these proceedings.) California opposed the clemency petition through the office of the Los Angeles County District Attorney, who along with the Los Angeles Police Department and other law enforcement groups, disputed that Williams had reformed. They stated that he refused to inform officials about other gang members or the tactics and communication methods that the gangs used, as Williams said he did not want to be a "snitch". The clemency petition emphasized the theme of Williams' redemption and rehabilitation rather than his claim of actual innocence. The San Francisco Chronicle writer Bob Egelko doubted this method, based on the courts handling the appeals, and quoted Austin Sarat, professor of law and politics at Amherst College and author of Mercy on Trial, a book about compassion: Sarat said that actual innocence is "about the only ground in which governors grant clemency in the modern period ... I know of no case in which a death row inmate has been spared (solely) based on post-conviction rehabilitation."

On December 8, 2005, Governor Schwarzenegger held a clemency hearing at a one-hour, closed-door meeting, where a crowd consisting of both supporters of Williams and proponents of capital punishment congregated outside the California State Capitol in Sacramento. Schwarzenegger described the decision whether to grant clemency as "the toughest thing when you are governor, dealing with someone's life." While the clemency petition was pending before the governor, Williams filed further appeals in the courts. On November 30, 2005, the California Supreme Court, in a 4–3 decision, refused to reopen Williams' case. On December 11, 2005, the California Supreme Court denied Williams' request for a stay of execution. Supporters of Williams also made another plea directly to Governor Schwarzenegger to stay the execution.

Also during this period, the media, community organizations, and relatives of the victims were speaking out. In mid-November 2005, talk show hosts John and Ken of the John and Ken Show on Clear Channel's KFI radio in Los Angeles started a "Tookie Must Die (For Killing Four Innocent People)" hour on their show daily until the execution of Williams. During the hour, they interviewed advocates of both sides of the issue and expressed their support for the impending execution. Many anti-death penalty and civil rights organizations around the country organized activist campaigns to stop the execution, including the Campaign to End the Death Penalty, the NAACP, A.N.S.W.E.R., and others. Williams's friend, co-author, and political collaborator, Barbara Becnel, helped to spearhead much of the organizing. Celebrities also joined to stop the execution, including Snoop Dogg, who appeared at a clemency rally wearing a shirt advertising the Save Tookie website and performed a song he had written for Williams. Jamie Foxx, noting that Williams' execution date was his birthday, publicly stated that the only birthday present he wanted was clemency for Williams. Other prisoners were also involved in activism to save Williams's life, including Tony Ford, whose death sentence in a disputed case was indefinitely stayed, who helped organize a prison strike in Texas protesting the execution. On November 29, 2005, the American Civil Liberties Union of Northern California announced that more than 175,000 Californians had signed a petition requesting the temporary suspension of executions in California until the California Commission on the Fair Administration of Justice could complete its study, due for December 31, 2007. The "California Moratorium on Executions Act", A.B.1121, was scheduled to have its first hearing in January 2006. Press conferences and rallies in more than a dozen California cities called for a halt to all executions. They asked Governor Schwarzenegger to commute Williams' death sentence to life without parole.

On December 8, 2005, Lora Owens, the stepmother of Albert Owens, made a statement expressing her opinion of Stanley Williams: "I think he [Williams] is the same cold-blooded killer that he was then and he would be now if he had the opportunity again." Owens' two daughters, who were 8 and 5 years old when their father was murdered, also opposed clemency and recalled that they were shocked when they had learned that their father's murderer was nominated for a Nobel Peace Prize. By contrast, on December 9, 2005, Linda Owens, Albert Owens' widow, stated support of Williams' efforts to bring an end to gang violence and his call for peace between gangs: "I, Linda Owens want to build upon Mr. Williams' peace initiative. I invite Mr. Williams to join me in sending a message to all communities that we should all unite in peace. This position of peace would honor my husband's memory and Mr. Williams' work."

On December 12, 2005, Governor Schwarzenegger denied clemency for Williams. In his denial, Schwarzenegger cited the following:

- "The possible irregularities in Williams' trial have been thoroughly and carefully reviewed by the courts, and there is no reason to disturb the judicial decisions that uphold the jury's decisions that he is guilty of these four murders and should pay with his life."
- The basis of his request for clemency is the "personal redemption Stanley Williams has experienced and the positive impact of the message he sends," yet "it is impossible to separate Williams' claim of innocence from his claim of redemption."
- "Cumulatively, the evidence demonstrating Williams is guilty of these murders is strong and compelling … there is no reason to second guess the jury's decision of guilt or raise significant doubts or serious reservations about Williams' convictions and death sentence."
- "Williams has written books that instruct readers to avoid the gang lifestyle and to stay out of prison … he has also … tried to preach a message of gang avoidance and peacemaking … it is hard to assess the effect of such efforts in concrete terms, but the continued pervasiveness of gang violence leads one to question the efficacy of Williams' message."
- "The dedication of Williams' book Life in Prison casts significant doubt on his redemption ... the mix of individuals on [the dedication] list is curious … but the inclusion of George Jackson on the list defies reason and is a significant indicator that Williams is not reformed and that he still sees violence and lawlessness as a legitimate means to address societal problems."
- "Is Williams' redemption complete and sincere, or is it just a hollow promise? Stanley Williams insists he is innocent, and that he will not and should not apologize or otherwise atone for the murders of the four victims in this case. Without an apology and atonement for these senseless and brutal killings, there can be no redemption. In this case, the one thing that would be the clearest indication of complete remorse and full redemption is the one thing Williams will not do."

Governor Schwarzenegger summarized by basing his denial of clemency on the "totality of circumstances". On the same day that Schwarzenegger denied Williams clemency, Jonathan Harris, a New York counsel with Curtis, Mallet-Prevost, Colt & Mosle LLP, filed a response summarizing new evidence of innocence. It included reference to an affidavit by Gordon Bradbury von Ellerman attesting to belief in Williams' innocence. Dated December 10, it states that he called the NAACP on December 8 after reading in the Daily Breeze that his cellmate, George Oglesby, had testified against Williams. He states that he had observed Oglesby receive police reports on Williams and others. Mr. Oglesby told Von Ellerman that he was using the documents to testify against Williams and others "to gain a reduction or eliminate charges against him." Von Ellerman also observed Oglesby copying from samples of Williams' handwriting to "create incriminating documents that would appear to be written by Mr. Williams." Prosecutors had cited handwritten notes written by Williams about an escape plan that involved the killing of a bus driver and another accomplice.

== Execution ==
On December 13, 2005, sixteen days away from his 52nd birthday, after exhausting all forms of appeal, Williams was executed by lethal injection at San Quentin State Prison. Newsweek reported thousands of protesters outside, most of whom were seeking clemency for Williams. He was the 12th person to be executed by the state of California following the 1976 U.S. Supreme Court decision of Gregg v. Georgia. Williams provided no last words to the prison warden, but in an interview on WBAI Pacifica radio hours before the execution, he stated:

"My lack of fear of this barbaric methodology of death, I rely upon my faith. It has nothing to do with machismo, with manhood, or with some pseudo former gang street code. This is pure faith, and predicated on my redemption. So, therefore, I just stand strong and continue to tell you, your audience, and the world that I am innocent and, yes, I have been a wretched person, but I have redeemed myself. And I say to you and all those who can listen and will listen that redemption is tailor-made for the wretched, and that's what I used to be ... That's what I would like the world to remember me. That's how I would like my legacy to be remembered as: a redemptive transition, something that I believe is not exclusive just for the so-called sanctimonious, the elitists. And it doesn't—is not predicated on color or race or social stratum or one's religious background. It's accessible for everybody. That's the beauty about it. And whether others choose to believe that I have redeemed myself or not, I worry not, because I know and God knows, and you can believe that all of the youths that I continue to help, they know, too. So with that, I am grateful ... I say to you and everyone else, God bless. So take care."

Witnesses described the mood in the execution chamber as somber, and Williams showed no resistance as he was led into the execution chamber. After Williams was strapped to the gurney, he struggled against the straps holding him down to look up at the press gallery behind him, and to exchange glances with his supporters. Williams's advocate and editor Barbara Becnel was also a witness to his execution. In the epilogue of Williams's reprinted memoir, Blue Rage, Black Redemption, Becnel reported that prior to Williams's arrival in the death chamber, he had promised her that "he would find a way to lift his head and smile at me at some point during his execution, no matter what was being done to him. And that is exactly what he did." Williams then rested his head on the gurney while medical technicians began inserting needles in his veins, although CNN reported the staff had difficulty inserting the needles and the usually short process took almost 20 minutes. Contra Costa Times reporter John Simerman added, "They had some trouble with the second I.V., which was in the left arm… Williams, at one point, grimaced or looked almost out of frustration…at the difficulty there…He had his glasses on the whole time. He kept them on, and he kept looking…" With a look of frustration on his face, Williams angrily asked the technicians, "You guys doing that right?" A female guard whispered to him, and a second guard patted Williams's shoulder as if to comfort him. Williams shed one silent tear but otherwise showed no emotion as he was executed. Members of Albert Owens' family who witnessed the execution were described as stony-faced; however, Lora Owens appeared very upset, according to MSNBC anchor Rita Cosby.

Kevin Fagan, a reporter for the San Francisco Chronicle, wrote a detailed description of the execution:

This is the sixth one I have seen here at San Quentin, and I have to say this was very different. The most notable thing was that Williams had supporters at the back of the room ... Mrs. Becnel was among them, I understand. We could see them, and throughout the last part of the execution—or preparing him when he was still conscious, they gave what looked like black power salutes several times to him, one man and two women. And most strikingly at the end of the execution, as those three were heading out, they yelled, 'The State of California just killed an innocent man!' which is the first time I ever heard any outburst in the death chamber there.

After Williams was pronounced dead at 12:35 a.m. PST (08:35 UTC), several reporters who witnessed the execution held a news conference.

== Funeral and aftermath ==
Williams's spokeswoman and co-author Barbara Becnel said shortly after Williams's death that she is "now on a mission" to obtain justice for him. Williams directed Becnel to receive his body and Becnel began making the funeral arrangements.

Becnel reacted to Williams's execution by saying, "We are going to prove his innocence, and when we do, we are going to show that Governor Arnold Schwarzenegger is, in fact, himself a cold blooded murderer."

Williams's body was laid out for viewing on December 19, 2005, and drew 2,000 mourners. A memorial service was held in Los Angeles on December 20, 2005, where Becnel read his final wishes. Williams's funeral filled the 1,500-seat Bethel AME Church and drew a wide variety of people from current gang members to celebrities and religious leaders. On June 25, 2006, Barbara Becnel and Williams' longtime friend, Shirley Neal, sprinkled his ashes into a lake in Thokoza Park in the city of Soweto, South Africa as Williams had wished.

At his funeral, the last words of Williams echoed from a tape played to mourners, whom he asked to spread a message to loved ones:

The war within me is over. I battled my demons and I was triumphant. Teach them how to avoid our destructive footsteps. Teach them to strive for higher education. Teach them to promote peace and teach them to focus on rebuilding the neighborhoods that you, others, and I helped to destroy.

Rapper Snoop Dogg, himself a Crip, recited a poem to mourners about the execution:

It's 9:15 on 12/13 and another black king will be taken from the scene.

In his birth nation of Austria, Schwarzenegger faced backlash over the execution on December 19 from left-wing councillors in Graz, who announced that they were seeking to strip him of his Austrian citizenship. Schwarzenegger sent a letter to Graz on December 19 demanding his name to be removed from a stadium that had borne his name since 1997. He also wrote that he was revoking his permission for Graz to use his name in any advertising campaigns that promote the city. On December 26, Schwarzenegger's name was removed from the stadium.

== Personal life ==
Williams-Taylor talked to her ex-husband by phone that day. "He was great. He said he was at peace with himself and proud of his son", according to Leslie Fulbright, a staff writer for the San Francisco Chronicle. Williams' oldest son, Travon, is a married father who owns a home and works for a social services agency in the Los Angeles area, said Barbara Becnel, Stanley Williams' co-author.

Travon was the only family member who spoke at the funeral. He "brought the church to its feet" when he promised to teach Schwarzenegger about redemption. He said, "I feel it's my duty to go on a worldwide campaign to show that redemption is real.”

== See also ==
- Larry Hoover – American gang leader (born 1950)
- List of people executed in California
- List of people executed in the United States in 2005
- Redemption: The Stan Tookie Williams Story – 2004 television film directed by Vondie Curtis-Hall

== Notes ==
Preceded by Donald Jay Beardslee	Executions carried out in California	Succeeded by Clarence Ray Allen
