= Brian Gibson (director) =

English film director (1944–2004)

- Born: 22 September 1944; Southend-on-Sea, Essex, England
- Died: 4 January 2004 (aged 59); London, England
- Occupations: Film director, television director
- Years active: 1960s–2002

Brian Gibson (22 September 1944 – 4 January 2004) was an English film and television director.

== Early life and education ==
Gibson was born 22 September 1944 in Southend-on-Sea, Essex. His mother, Victoria, was a shop assistant and his father was a carpenter. He had a sister, June. Gibson attended Southend High School for Boys and St Catharine's College, Cambridge, where he studied medicine. He also studied History of Science at Darwin College, Cambridge. He graduated from Cambridge University.

== Career ==
In the late 1960s, Gibson began working for the BBC, directing scientific documentaries for their long-running series Horizon. One standout episode entitled "Joey," about Joey Deacon, a lifelong brain-damaged man who found a way to communicate with his family through another similarly affected patient at his hospital, won him an SFTA Award for Best Specialized Programme of 1974.

Gibson directed Helen Mirren in the 1979 BBC film Blue Remembered Hills and his work on that film won him a BAFTA Award for Best Director.

Gibson made his feature film directorial debut with Breaking Glass (1980). In 1986, he directed Poltergeist II: The Other Side. In 1989, he directed Ben Kingsley in the HBO television film Murderers Among Us: The Simon Wiesenthal Story. In 1990, Gibson directed the miniseries Drug Wars: The Camarena Story, starring Steven Bauer and Benicio Del Toro. Gibson won a Primetime Emmy and a Directors Guild of America Award for directing the HBO television film The Josephine Baker Story (1991). In 1993, he directed the Oscar nominated film What's Love Got to Do with It, starring Angela Bassett and Laurence Fishburne. This led to a first look deal with Touchstone Pictures. In 1996, he directed Demi Moore and Alec Baldwin in The Juror. In 1998, he directed the British film Still Crazy starring Bill Nighy and Billy Connolly. Gibson served as an executive producer for Frida (2002), starring Salma Hayek and Alfred Molina. He was preparing to direct a film for 20th Century Fox, and also collaborating on a script with his wife when he was diagnosed with cancer.

== Personal life and death ==
Gibson had homes in London and Los Angeles.

In 1990, Gibson married Lynn Whitfield. They have a daughter Grace. Their marriage ended in divorce. After their divorce he married the artist Paula Rae Gibson, with whom he had another daughter, Raphaela.

Gibson died of bone cancer in London on 4 January 2004; he was 59.

== Filmography ==
Year	Title
1980	Breaking Glass
1983	Kilroy Was Here
1986	Poltergeist II: The Other Side
1993	What's Love Got to Do with It
1996	The Juror
1998	Still Crazy

== Television ==
Year	Title	Notes
1972-1976	Horizon	3 episodes, including The Billion Dollar Bubble
1976	BBC2 Playhouse	Episode: The Chauffeur
1976	Where Adam Stood	TV film
1978	Play for Today	2 episodes, including Blue Remembered Hills
1979	ScreenPlay	Episode: Gossip from the Forest
1989	Murderers Among Us: The Simon Wiesenthal Story	TV film
1990	Drug Wars: The Camarena Story	Miniseries
1991	The Josephine Baker Story	TV film

Directed Academy Award performances
Under Gibson's direction, these actors have received Academy Award nominations for their performances in their respective roles.

Year	Performer	Film	Result
Academy Award for Best Actor
1993	Laurence Fishburne	What's Love Got to Do with It	Nominated
Academy Award for Best Actress
1993	Angela Bassett	What's Love Got to Do with It	Nominated
