= Kilroy Was Here (1983 film) =

- Directed by: Brian Gibson
- Written by: Brian Gibson; Dennis DeYoung (story)
- Produced by: Jerry Kramer; Susan Smitman
- Cinematography: Stephen Goldblatt
- Release date: 1983
- Running time: 10 minutes
- Country: United States
- Language: English

Kilroy Was Here is a short film made to tie in with the Styx album of the same name. It was played at the beginning of each Styx show on their 1983 tour. It was written and directed by Brian Gibson of Still Crazy, What's Love Got to Do With It, The Josephine Baker Story and Poltergeist II fame.

The VHS video release of the Kilroy Was Here mini-film and live concert is also known as Caught in the Act in the United States.

== Plot ==
The film tells of a future where rock music is outlawed by a fascist theocratic government and the "MMM (the Majority for Musical Morality)". The story's protagonist, Robert Orin Charles Kilroy, is a former rock star who has been framed for murder and imprisoned by MMM leader Dr. Everett Righteous. In this future society, policing and other peacekeeping duties are maintained by robots; in the prison where Kilroy is kept, "Roboto" humanoid models act as prison guards.

Meanwhile, a young musician/activist, Jonathan Chance, is on a mission to bring rock music back. He is shown leaving a shibboleth graffiti tag, and later comes to the attention of Kilroy when he pirates an MMM video broadcast with a Kilroy video (actually the Styx music video for "Borrowed Time" dubbed over with DeYoung clean shaven). This inspires Kilroy to disable a Roboto, steal its mask as a disguise, and escape prison.

At night, Chance breaks into the Paradise Theatre, the site of the Kilroy concert where an MMM member was allegedly killed by Kilroy. The theater has since been turned into an MMM museum against rock music, filled with animatronic replicas of "decadent" rock stars such as Jimi Hendrix, Elvis Presley, and Kilroy. Still disguised as a Roboto, the real Kilroy emerges from the shadows and reveals himself to Chance. At this point the film ends (when shown in concert, this would segue into the opening song by the band, "Mr. Roboto").

== Cast ==
- Dennis DeYoung as Robert Orin Charles Kilroy (R.O.C.K.), a former rock star, the protagonist of the story
- Tommy Shaw as Jonathan Chance, a young musician who allies himself with Kilroy
- James "J.Y." Young as Dr. Everett Righteous, MMM leader, the antagonist of the story
- Chuck Panozzo as Lt. Vanish, Righteous henchman/Prisoner #2
- John Panozzo as Col. Hyde, Righteous henchman/Prisoner
- Robert Griffard as Mr Roboto and voice of the Roboto
- Robert Romanus as Jonathan Chance's Friend
- Michael Winslow as Jimi (uncredited)
