= Barbara Becnel =

American film producer

Barbara Cottman Becnel (born May 30, 1950) is an American author, journalist, and film producer. She was a close friend of Crips co-founder Stanley Williams (aka "Stan Tookie Williams"; a convicted murderer and former gang leader who would later become an anti-gang activist and writer), and editor of Williams's series of children's books, which spoke out against gang violence. Williams was executed in 2005. Becnel co-produced the Golden Globe-nominated film Redemption: The Stan Tookie Williams Story, which starred award-winning actress Lynn Whitfield playing the role of Becnel.

== Biography ==
Becnel was in attendance at Williams' execution as one of his chosen witnesses. After he was pronounced dead, she, along with two of his friends, television executive Shirley Neal and movie producer Rudy Langlais, stood up and yelled that California had executed an innocent man. After the execution, she said "We are going to prove his innocence, and when we do, we are going to show that Gov. Arnold Schwarzenegger is, in fact, himself a cold blooded murderer."

Williams directed Becnel to make the arrangements for his funeral, which was held at Bethel African Methodist Episcopal Church on December 20, 2005. More than 3,000 people attended Williams' memorial service. On Sunday, June 25, 2006, Becnel and Neal released Williams' ashes into a lake in Thokoza Park, located in the black township of Soweto, Gauteng, South Africa. In February 2009, Becnel and Neal released Tribute: Stanley Tookie Williams, 1953–2005, a documentary they directed and produced about Williams.

Announcing her intention to defeat Schwarzenegger in the upcoming gubernatorial election, Becnel ran for the Democratic Party's nomination for Governor of California in 2006, the first black female to do so. She finished with 66,544 votes overall, which amounted to 2.7% of all ballots cast, coming in third out of eight Democrats behind Phil Angelides and Steve Westly. Her campaign attracted media attention, and she raised enough money in the last week of the campaign to run television and radio commercials.

She publicly denounced Democratic Gubernatorial candidates Phil Angelides and Steve Westly for supporting the death penalty. She is also outspoken on other social issues, such as the environment and immigration. Barbara's outspoken criticism of Angelides and Westly resulted in her not being invited to a number of key Democratic Party events during the general election season.

This, coupled with differences over issues such as the death penalty, led Barbara to leave the Democratic Party. In the first weeks of 2007 Barbara left the Democratic Party and joined the Green Party of California, the state affiliate of the Green Party (GPUS). When asked why she joined the Green Party, Becnel responded, "The Green Party is right on the issues—no ifs, ands, or buts."

== Selected works ==
- Parents Who Help Their Children Overcome Drugs (1990), Compcare Publications; ISBN 0-89638-218-4
- The Co-Dependent Parent: Free Yourself by Freeing Your Child (1991), Harper San Francisco; ISBN 0-06-250126-7
- Life in Prison (2001), Seastar Books; ISBN 1-58717-093-0 (co-author)
- Gangs and the Abuse of Power (1997), Hazelden Publishing & Educational Services; ISBN 1-56838-130-1 (co-author)
- Gangs and Drugs (1997), Hazelden Publishing & Educational Services; ISBN 1-56838-135-2 (co-author)
- Gangs and Self-Esteem (1997), PowerKids Press; ISBN 0-8239-2344-4 (co-author)
- Gangs and Violence (1997), Hazelden Publishing & Educational Services; ISBN 1-56838-134-4 (co-author)
- Gangs and Your Friends (1997), PowerKids Press; ISBN 0-8239-2341-X (co-author)
- Gangs and Your Neighborhood (1997), Hazelden Information & Educational Services; ISBN 1-56838-137-9 (co-author)
