= Nappily Ever After =

2018 American romantic comedy film by Haifaa al-Mansour

- Film poster
- Directed by: Haifaa al-Mansour
- Screenplay by: Adam Brooks
- Story by: Adam Brooks; Cee Marcellus
- Based on: Nappily Ever After by Trisha R. Thomas
- Produced by: Tracey Bing; Jared LeBoff; Marc Platt; Sanaa Lathan
- Starring: Sanaa Lathan; Ernie Hudson; Lyriq Bent; Lynn Whitfield; Ricky Whittle; Daria Johns; Camille Guaty
- Cinematography: Alar Kivilo
- Edited by: Jay Deuby
- Music by: Lesley Barber
- Production companies: Netflix; Marc Platt Productions; Badabing Pictures
- Distributed by: Netflix
- Release date: September 21, 2018 (United States)
- Running time: 98 minutes
- Country: United States
- Language: English

Nappily Ever After is a 2018 American romantic comedy film directed by Haifaa al-Mansour and written by Adam Brooks and Cee Marcellus. It is based on the novel of the same name by Trisha R. Thomas. The film stars Sanaa Lathan, Ernie Hudson, Lyriq Bent, Lynn Whitfield, Ricky Whittle, Daria Johns, and Camille Guaty.

The film was released on September 21, 2018, by Netflix.

== Plot ==
Insisting she look perfect at all times, Violet's mother Paulette works diligently to straighten her natural hair. Violet struggles with her mother's perspective until her hair becomes naturally wild and frizzy after jumping into a pool; when the other children begin to ruthlessly tease her, a horrified Paulette rushes her home.

As an adult, Violet is seemingly perfect: a successful advertising executive, she has a doctor boyfriend Clint and wears her hair long and straight with great effort. Her relationship with Paulette continues to be close as she helps keep Violet close to the vision of perfection. However, their relationship with Violet's father became estranged after he quit his job to become a model.

Expecting Clint's proposal on her birthday, Violet rushes urgently to the hairdresser Will's when a neighbor's kids accidentally spray her. Relaxer is erroneously given to Will by his daughter Zoe, causing her to lose handfuls of hair. Violet furiously explodes at Zoe, insulting her afro before getting a weave.

At her birthday dinner, Clint surprises a disappointed Violet with a chihuahua instead of a proposal. Confronting him later, he confesses he does not feel like he truly knows her, comparing their relationships to a "two-year first date." So, Violet ends it.

Violet catches Zoe shoplifting, so drags her out of the store, only to be stopped by a security guard. Will arrives and is furious at Zoe. When Violet suggests something could be wrong with her, Will rebuffs her before leaving with his daughter.

Violet bleaches her hair blonde that night and goes to the club with her friends. After getting drunk, she unsuccessfully attempts to have a one-night-stand, as the man busts his head open during foreplay. Then Violet goes to visit Clint at the hospital, but finds him with another woman. Defeated, Violet returns home and discovers her hair has gone frizzy.

The next morning, Violet is horrified to find she shaved her head. Wearing a scarf on her head, she cries in the bathroom at work. A woman there suggests she come to her support group, which she later discovers is for cancer survivors. Violet apologizes, but the group leader gives her words of support.

Violet eventually grows confident with her new look. She begins dating Will and befriending his daughter, Zoe. They quickly grow close, so he attends her mother's Fourth of July party. There, Paulette disrespects him, making condescending comments about him and his profession. Will breaks up with Violet, suggesting she sort herself out.

After losing a pitch for an ad campaign with diverse women to a male colleague's idea using blonde models, Violet quits her job. At home, she is carefreely dancing to upbeat music when Clint stops by to get his things. He quietly watches, admiring her loosening up. As they broke up months ago, Clint is interested in Violet and apologizes. As the dog peed on Clint’s shirt, she allows him to shower. Then, Violet joins him and they have sex.

The next morning, Violet is preparing breakfast, but Clint insists she sit at the table, and cuts onions. He proposes with an onion ring and she accepts. Both she and her mom are excited, and Violet’s friends are told the wedding is in three months. Violet, who has stayed connected with Zoe, invites her to the engagement party.

Clint requests Violet straighten her hair to meet his parents, so Paulette comes to help. At the party, Clint’s parents make Violet feel pressured and uneasy. So, she goes off alone. Her heels are killing her, so she takes them off.

As everyone is waiting for Violet, her parents look for her. Upon finding her, she says she envies Zoe for knowing who she is and would go barefoot. Violet heads to the pool shoeless then, surrounded by tables of people, jumps in. Inviting everyone to join in, Zoe, Violet’s two girlfriends, and others join her. Violet’s father grabs her mother and they jump in, making up with a kiss. Clint disappointedly looks on.

Some days later, Violet is pitching Will’s plant-based hair products for women’s natural hair in an agency. Afterwards, she and Will walk out together, they speak briefly and Violet walks away confidently.

== Cast ==
- Sanaa Lathan as Violet Jones
- Ernie Hudson as Richard Jones
- Lyriq Bent as Will Wright
- Lynn Whitfield as Paulette Jones
- Ricky Whittle as Clint Conroy
- Camille Guaty as Wendy
- Terry Serpico as Bill
- Brittany S. Hall as Natasha
- Daria Johns as Zoe Wright
- Danielle Lyn as Alicia
- John Salley as Tyson Edwards
- RonReaco Lee as Gerard
- Puff the Dog as Lola

== Production ==
The romantic comedy project Nappily Ever After was previously in development by Universal Pictures in 2003, when the studio had Patricia Cardoso to direct the film adaptation of Trisha R. Thomas' novel of same name, and the script was written by Tina Gordon Chism which was later rewritten by Lisa Loomer. Halle Berry was boarded to star in the film which had producers Berry and Marc Platt along with Vincent Cirrincione and Angela DeJoseph.

On August 15, 2017, it was announced that the film was now developing by Netflix and Sanaa Lathan was cast to play the lead role, which Haifaa al-Mansour would direct from a screenplay by Adam Brooks and Cee Marcellus. Producers would be Platt, Tracey Bing, Jared Leboff, and Lathan. Ernie Hudson also joined the film to play Violet Jones' (Lathan) father Richard. In August 2017, Lynn Whitfield had joined the film to play Violet's mother, Paulette. In September 2017, more cast was announced which included Ricky Whittle as Clint, a doctor from London who has a long-term relationship with Violet; Lyriq Bent to play Will Wright, a hair stylist and salon owner who starts a new relationship with Violet; and Camille Guaty also joined the film to play Wendy, one of Violet's best friends. On September 11, 2017, Brittany S. Hall was cast in the film to play one of Violet's best friends.

Principal photography on the film began on August 28, 2017 in Atlanta. Lathan shaved her head for her role in the film.

== Release ==
The film was released on September 21, 2018.

== Reception ==
The film holds an approval rating of 67% on Rotten Tomatoes based on 15 reviews.
