= Lynn Whitfield =

American actress (born 1953)

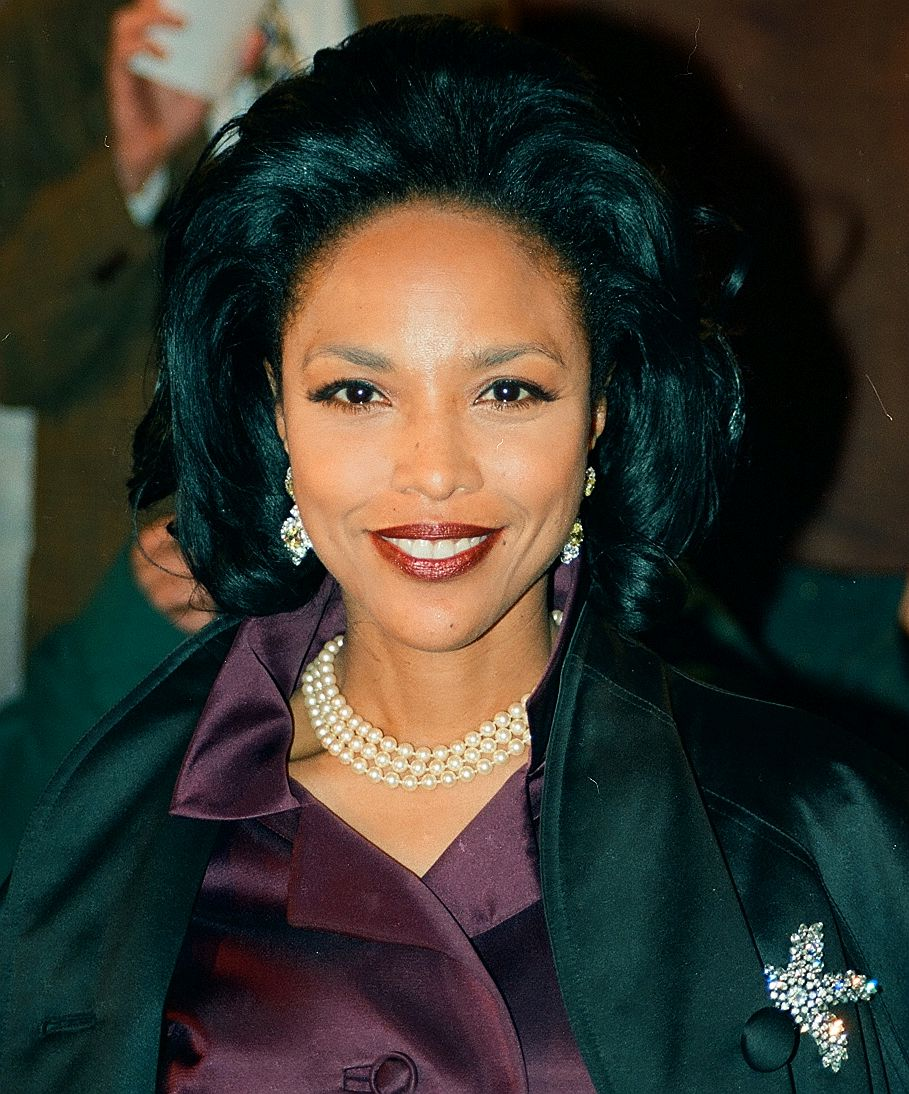
- Whitfield in 1999
- Born: Lynn Smith; February 15, 1953 (age 73); Baton Rouge, Louisiana, U.S.
- Occupation: Actress
- Years active: 1977–present
- Spouses: Vantile Whitfield (m. 1974; div. 1978) Brian Gibson (m. 1990; div. 1992)
- Children: 1

Lynn Whitfield (née Smith; born February 15, 1953) is an American actress. She began her acting career in television and theatre before progressing to supporting roles in film. She won a Primetime Emmy Award for Outstanding Lead Actress in a Limited Series or Movie and received a Golden Globe Award nomination for her breakout performance as Josephine Baker in the HBO biographical film The Josephine Baker Story (1991).

In the 1990s, Whitfield played leading roles in a number of made-for-television movies and had several starring roles in theatrical films, including A Thin Line Between Love and Hate (1996), Gone Fishin' (1997), Eve's Bayou (1997), Stepmom (1998), Head of State (2003), Madea's Family Reunion (2006), and The Women (2008). Whitfield also starred in a number of movies in the 2000s and 2010s. From 2016 to 2020, she starred as Lady Mae Greenleaf in the Oprah Winfrey Network dramatic series Greenleaf, for which she won critical acclaim and garnered two NAACP Image Awards and a Gracie Award. She later appeared in films Nappily Ever After (2018), Vacation Friends (2021) and The Retirement Plan (2023). Whitfield has won a total of seven NAACP Image Awards.

== Early life ==
Whitfield was born in Baton Rouge, Louisiana, the daughter of Jean (née Butler), a former president of the Louisiana Housing Finance Agency, and Dr. Valerian Smith, who was also a composer who wrote the musicals, The Supper and The Wake. Her mother is a founding member of the Baton Rouge chapter of The Links Incorporated and is a member of Alpha Kappa Alpha sorority. Whitfield is an honorary member of Alpha Kappa Alpha sorority.

== Career ==
=== 1970s ===
Following graduation, she first garnered attention on the stage by performing with the Black Repertory Company in Washington, D.C. She married playwright/director/actor Vantile Whitfield, one of the company's co-founders and a pioneer of black theatre, in 1974. She eventually moved to New York and appeared off-Broadway in such shows as The Great Macdaddy and Showdown Time before earning international acclaim touring the United States, Australia and London's West End in the 1977 production of the landmark play "for colored girls who have considered suicide / when the rainbow is enuf" alongside Alfre Woodard.

=== 1980s ===
Whitfield made her professional screen debut in 1981 as Jill Thomas in the critically acclaimed NBC serial drama Hill Street Blues. In 1983, she appeared in the comedy film Doctor Detroit (1983), playing the supporting role of Thelma Cleland. She later co-starred in the films The Slugger's Wife, Silverado, and Jaws: The Revenge. She also starred in the television films The George McKenna Story opposite Denzel Washington and Johnnie Mae Gibson: FBI as the title character and in the ABC miniseries The Women of Brewster Place alongside Oprah Winfrey and Cicely Tyson). She also was a regular cast member in the short-lived 1988 ABC female-driven medical drama series HeartBeat alongside Kate Mulgrew, Laura Johnson, and Gail Strickland.

=== 1990s ===
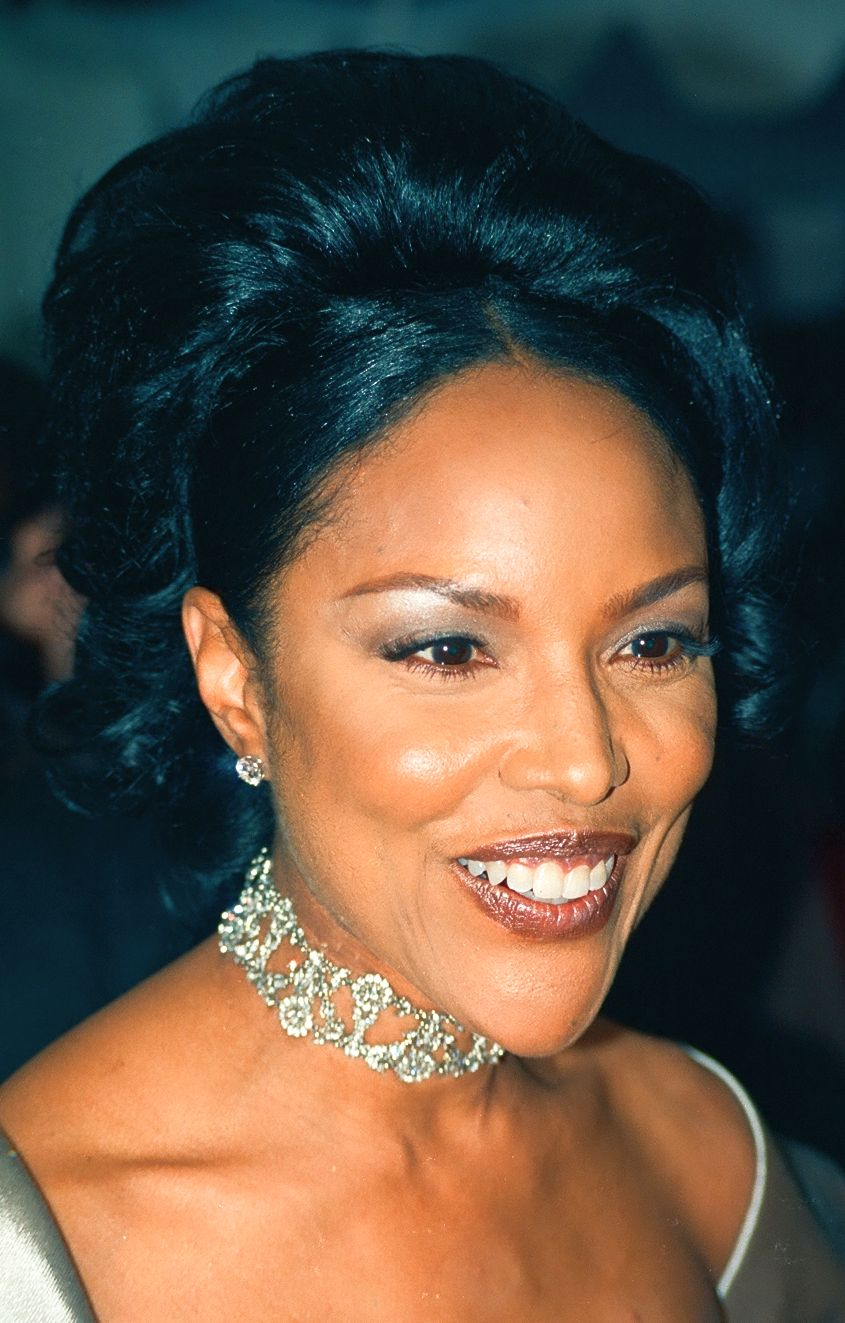
Whitfield in 1996

Whitfield achieved wide recognition in the title role of The Josephine Baker Story (1991), portraying the American who became a Folies Bergère star, a French Resistance fighter during World War II, and a civil rights activist. The HBO biopic required her to age from 18 to 68. After a highly publicized casting call, Whitfield was chosen over hundreds of women. In the movie, she appeared nude on-screen. In his review, Ken Tucker of Entertainment Weekly said: "Whitfield is exceptionally good as the legendary singer-dancer who came to prominence in the ’20s for her throaty singing and her notorious "banana dance"—a wiggly little number executed while wearing nothing except a skirt of real bananas." The New York Times added that Whitfield "powerfully captures her [Baker's] passionate determination." Whitfield won a Primetime Emmy Award for Outstanding Lead Actress in a Miniseries or a Movie for her role, and said this gave her "the greatest sense of accomplishment and realization of my vision. It absolutely called upon everything I thought I could do at that point." She also received a Golden Globe Award for Best Actress – Miniseries or Television Film nomination and won the NAACP Image Award for Outstanding Actress in a Television Movie, Mini-Series or Dramatic Special.

After her breakthrough as Josephine Baker, Whitfield had the recurring role in the ABC legal drama Equal Justice, appearing opposite Joe Morton. She continued her career, starring in the made-for-television movies A Triumph of the Heart: The Ricky Bell Story (1991); Stompin' at the Savoy (1992) with Vanessa L. Williams, Jasmine Guy, and Vanessa Bell Calloway; Taking the Heat (1993) with Tony Goldwyn; State of Emergency (1994) with Joe Mantegna; Sophie and the Moonhanger (1996); The Wedding (1998), as Halle Berry's mother; and Deep in My Heart (1999) opposite Anne Bancroft. She also had a regular role on the short-lived NBC detective series The Cosby Mysteries from 1994 to 1995 and later guest-starred on Martin and Touched by an Angel.

In 1996, Whitfield was cast as the female lead opposite Martin Lawrence in the dark romantic comedy film A Thin Line Between Love and Hate. At the time of filming, Lawrence was 12 years younger than Whitfield, who was then 42. The film grossed over $35 million against a budget of $8 million. In 1997, she co-starred opposite Danny Glover and Rosanna Arquette in the comedy film Gone Fishin', appeared in the supporting role in the Canadian drama The Planet of Junior Brown, and played the mother of Jurnee Smollett's title character in the critically acclaimed independent drama Eve's Bayou.

In 1998, Whitfield had supporting role of an oncologist in the comedy-drama film Stepmom.

Also in 1998, she starred as Minnie McGhee in the historical TV drama The Color of Courage, which was based on the historical legal milestone "Sipes vs McGhee": Minnie moves into an all-white neighbourhood in Detroit with her husband Orsel (Roger Guenveur Smith) and befriends her white next-door neighbour Anna Sipes (Linda Hamilton), but other neighbours enlist Anna's husband (Bruce Greenwood) to evict them

=== 2000s—present ===
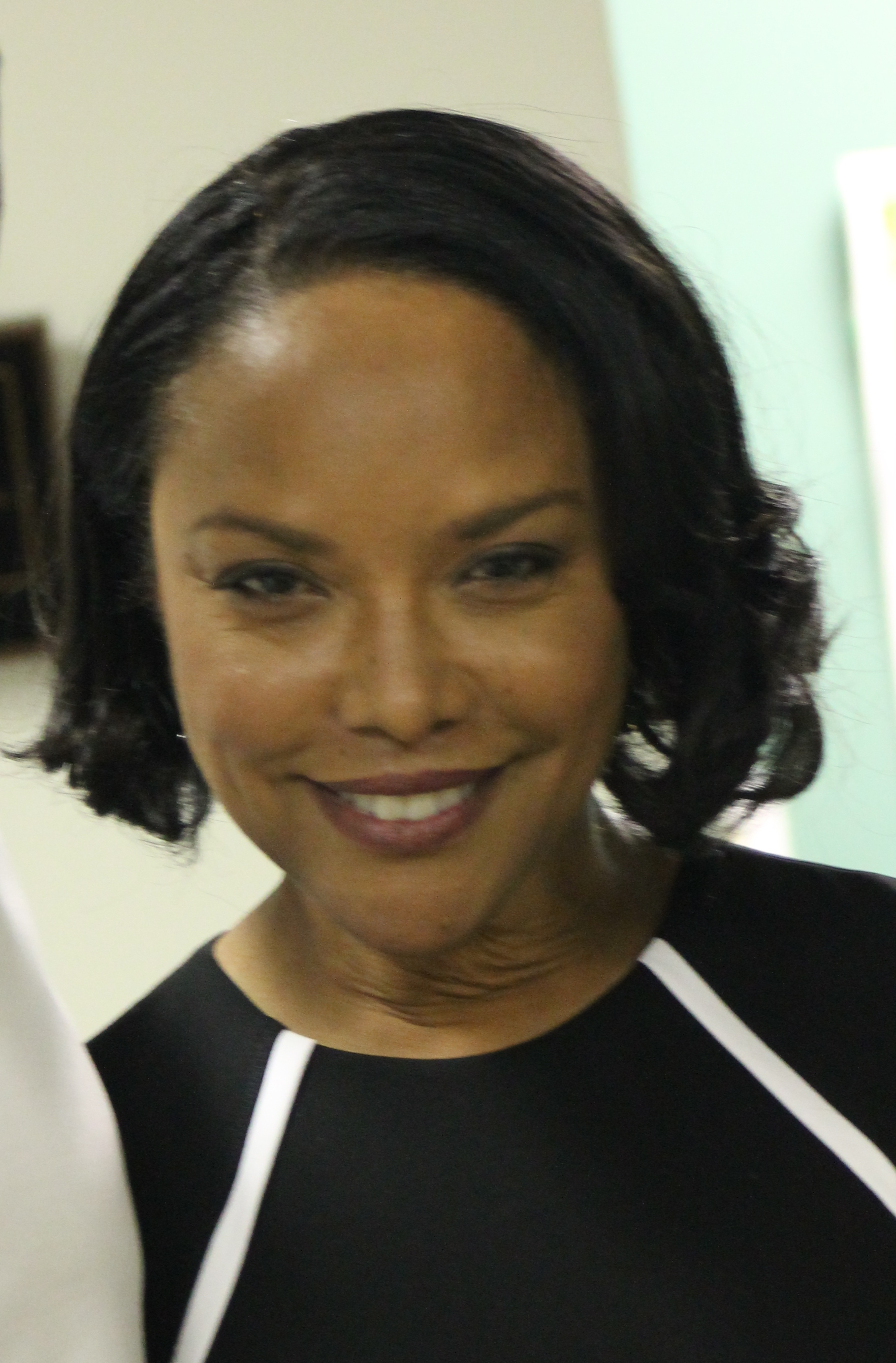
Whitfield on the set of Curveball, in 2014

In the 2000s, Whitfield had many supporting roles on television and in films. She co-starred in the Chris Rock comedy film Head of State (2003) and Tyler Perry's Madea's Family Reunion (2006). Whitfield also appeared in The Women (2008), The Rebound (2009), and Mama, I Want to Sing (2011) and had many roles in low-profile B-movies. She also starred as Dorothea Garibaldi, the mother of Galleria (played by Raven-Symoné) in the Disney Channel films The Cheetah Girls and The Cheetah Girls 2. In 2004, she played Barbara Becnel in the made-for-television movie Redemption: The Stan Tookie Williams Story receiving NAACP Image Award for Outstanding Actress in a Television Movie, Mini-Series or Dramatic Special.

On television, Whitfield had recurring roles on Boston Public and Without a Trace in the 2000s. From 2014 to 2015, she appeared in the ABC legal drama How to Get Away with Murder as villainous Mary Walker. She also had a recurring role on Hit the Floor and appeared as the abusive mother of April (Rochelle Aytes) on Mistresses.

In 2015, Whitfield was cast as the main villain in Greenleaf, the Oprah Winfrey Network original scripted drama series about the unscrupulous world of the Greenleaf family and their sprawling Memphis megachurch. Whitfield played the leading role of Lady Mae Greenleaf, the imperious minister's wife and the power- and money-hungry matriarch of the family. The series also starred Keith David, Merle Dandridge, Kim Hawthorne, and Oprah Winfrey. Whitfield received positive reviews from critics for her performance. One critic stated: "Whitfield has the imperious aura of a grand soap opera diva in the tradition of Joan Collins." She won the NAACP Image Award for Outstanding Supporting Actress in a Drama Series in 2019 and 2020 as well as the Gracie Award for Outstanding Female Actor in a Supporting Role in a Drama Series in 2017. The series ended in 2020 after five seasons and 60 episodes. Whitfield later was cast in a leading role in Greenleaf's planned spinoff.

In 2018, Whitfield co-starred opposite Sanaa Lathan in the romantic comedy film Nappily Ever After, which was released on Netflix. She guest-starred as Shaunette Renée Wilson's mother, a famous Nigerian surgeon, on the Fox medical drama The Resident in 2019. In 2021, she co-starred in the comedy film Vacation Friends. In 2023, she appeared opposite Nicolas Cage and Ron Perlman in the action comedy film, The Retirement Plan. Also in 2023, she was cast as Alicia, an intimidating, fearless and powerful matriarch, in the Showtime crime drama series, The Chi during its sixth season. She was promoted to series regular for the seventh season. In 2024, Whitfield starred in the road drama film, Albany Road directed and written by Christine Swanson.

In 2025, Whitfield voiced an older Noni in the second episode of the miniseries Eyes of Wakanda.

== Personal life ==
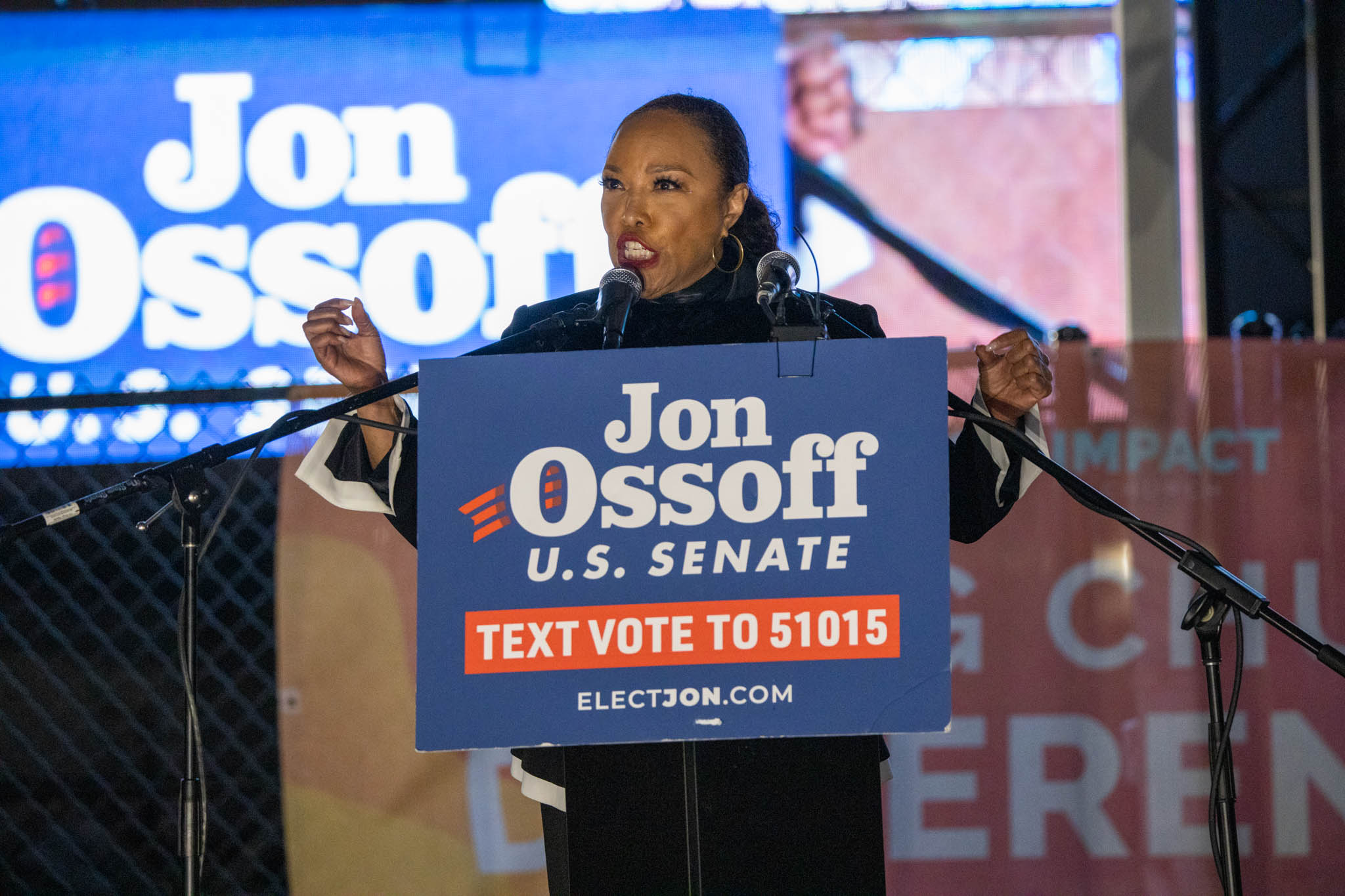
Whitfield speaking at a rally for Jon Ossoff's Senate campaign in 2020

Whitfield has been married twice. Her first husband, from 1974 to 1978, was Vantile Whitfield. From 1990 to 1992, she was married to director Brian Gibson, with whom she had a daughter, Grace.

== Filmography ==
=== Film ===
Year	Title	Role	Notes
1983	Doctor Detroit	Thelma Cleland	
1985	The Slugger's Wife	Tina Alvarado	
1985	Silverado	Rae Johnson	
1986	The George McKenna Story	Bobbie Maxwell	
1987	Jaws: The Revenge	Louisa McCay	
1989	Dead Aim	Sheila Freeman	
1994	In the Army Now	Sgt. Ladd	
1996	A Thin Line Between Love and Hate	Brandi Web	
1997	Gone Fishin'	Angie	
1997	The Planet of Junior Brown	Mrs. Brown	
1997	Eve's Bayou	Roz Batiste	
1998	Stepmom	Dr. P. Sweikert	
2002	A Time for Dancing	Linda Derricks	
2003	Head of State	Debra Lassiter	
2006	Madea's Family Reunion	Victoria Breaux	
2006	Confessions	Dr. Page	
2008	Kings of the Evening	Gracie	
2008	The Women	Glenda Hill	
2009	The Rebound	Laura Reilly	
2011	Mama, I Want to Sing!	Lillian Winter	
2011	All Things Fall Apart	Bee	
2012	Battlefield America	Ms. Lynn Parker	
2012	Redemption of a Dog	Francine	
2012	Training to Be A Superhero	MiMi Jakes	Short film and also producer
2013	Lonely Boy	Dr. Christine Nolan	
2013	24 Hour Love	Cynthia	
2013	King's Faith	Vanessa	
2013	Act Like You Love Me	Harriett Lofton	
2013	Someone to Love	Sophia Brent	Also producer
2013	The Last Letter	Lorraine	
2013	The Dempsey Sisters	Olivia Norman	
2014	Blood Lines	Vivian	
2014	Take the Spotlight	Lynn Watson	
2014	30 Days in Atlanta	Clara the Immigration Lawyer	
2014	Lap Dance	Momma Pearl	
2015	Curve Ball	Dr. Layne	
2016	Prayer Never Fails	Loral Hess	
2016	The North Star	Miss Grace	
2017	Espionage Tonight	Sydney Greenstreet	
2018	Nappily Ever After	Paulette Jones	
2018	Solace	Irene	
2020	Tales from the Hood 3	Marie Benoit	Video
2021	Vacation Friends	Suzanne Conway	
2023	The Retirement Plan	Francine Drisdale	
2024	Albany Road	Paula Henderson	
2026	Strung	Audra Jelani	

=== Television ===
Year	Title	Role	Notes
1981	Hill Street Blues	Jill Thomas	Recurring cast: season 1, guest: season 2
1982	American Playhouse	Woman in the bath	Episode: "For Colored Girls Who Have Considered Suicide/When the Rainbow Is Enuf"
1983	Matt Houston	Val	Episode: "The Centerfold Murders"
1985	Cagney & Lacey	Eleanor Taggart	Episode: "Who Says It's Fair: Part 1 & 2"
1985	Miami Vice	Odette Ribaud	Episode: "Bought and Paid For"
1985	The Insiders	Yvonne	Episode: "All This and the Old School Tie"
1985	The Fall Guy	Jeanne	Episode: "Escape Claus"
1985	The Fisher Family	-	Episode: "How Shall We Then Live?"
1986	The New Mike Hammer	Della Marvel	Episode: "Harlem Nocturne"
1986	Tall Tales & Legends	Pollie Ann	Episode: "John Henry"
1986	Johnnie Mae Gibson: FBI	Johnnie Mae Gibson	TV movie
1986	The George McKenna Story	Bobbie Maxwell	TV movie
1988	St. Elsewhere	Annie Callan	Episode: "Curtains"
1988–1989	HeartBeat	Dr. Cory Banks	Main cast
1989	The Women of Brewster Place	Lucielia "Ciel" Turner	Episode: "Episode #1.1 & #1.2"
1989	Snoops	Denise Kendall	Recurring cast
1990	American Playhouse	-	Episode: "Zora Is My Name!"
1990	Matlock	Angela Page	Episode: "The Informer Part 1 & 2"
1991	Equal Justice	Maggie Mayfield	Recurring cast: season 2
1991	The Trials of Rosie O'Neill		Episode: "Domestic Silence"
1991	The Josephine Baker Story	Josephine Baker	TV movie
1991	A Triumph of the Heart: The Ricky Bell Story	Natala	TV movie
1992	Stompin' at the Savoy	Esther	TV movie
1993	Taking the Heat	Carolyn Hunter	TV movie
1994	State of Emergency	Dehlia Johnson	TV movie
1994	Thicker Than Blood: The Larry McLinden Story	Bobbie Mallory	TV movie
1994–1995	The Cosby Mysteries	Barbara Lorenz	Main cast
1996	Sophie & the Moonhanger	Sophie	TV movie
1997	Martin	Ellen	Episode: "Goin' Overboard: Part 1 & 2"
1997	Touched by an Angel	Dr. Serena Hall	Episode: "Amazing Grace: Part 1 & 2"
1998	The Wedding	Corinne Coles	TV movie
1998	The Color of Courage	Minnie McGhee	TV movie
1999	Deep in My Heart	Corinne Burrell	TV movie
1999	Dangerous Evidence: The Lori Jackson Story	Lori Jackson	TV movie
1999	Love Songs	Jean Simpson	TV movie
2001	A Girl Thing	Nia Morgan	TV movie
2001	Boston Public	Louanna Harper	Recurring cast: season 2
2002	Lost in Oz	Bellaridere	TV movie
2002–2006	Without a Trace	Paula Van Doren	Recurring cast: season 1, guest: season 2 & 4
2003	The Cheetah Girls	Dorothea Garibaldi	TV movie
2004	Redemption: The Stan Tookie Williams Story	Barbara Becnel	TV movie
2004	Strong Medicine	Dr. Marshall	Episode: "Race for a Cure"
2006	Shark	Anita Astin	Episode: "Pilot"
2006	The Cheetah Girls 2	Dorothea Garibaldi	TV movie
2009	FlashForward	Anastasia Markham	Episode: "White to Play"
2012	Somebody's Child	Constance	TV movie
2012	Are We There Yet?	Pamela "Pam" Washington	Episode: "The Mother's-in-Law Episode" & "The Thanksgiving Episode"
2013	Fatal Attraction	Narrator	Season 1
2014	Family Time	Donna	Episode: "The Will"
2014	My Other Mother	Mary Jo	TV movie
2014	The Fright Night Files	Madame Mabry	TV movie
2014–2015	How to Get Away with Murder	Mary Walker	Recurring cast: season 1
2014–2016	Hit the Floor	Vanessa Howard	Recurring cast: season 2-3
2015	Chasing Life	Karen Callahan	Episode: "Model Behavior" & "No News Is Bad News"
2015	Fear Files	Madame Mabry	TV movie
2015–2016	Mistresses	Marjorie	Guest: season 3, recurring cast: season 4
2016–2020	Greenleaf	Lady Mae Greenleaf	Main cast
2019	The Resident	Josephine Okeke	Episode: "Queens"
2022	We Need a Little Christmas	Irene	TV movie
2023	Fantasy Island	Judy Jackson	Episode: "Mystery in Miami"
2023–2025	The Chi	Alicia	24 episodes
2025	Eyes of Wakanda	Old Noni (voice)	Episode: "Legends and Lies"
2025	St. Denis Medical	Barb	Episode: "A Very Robust Personal Life"
2027	The Cheetah Girls: Next Gen	Dorothea Garibaldi	TV movie - Post-production

== Awards and nominations ==
Year	Award	Category	Work	Result
1991	Emmy Awards	Outstanding Lead Actress in a Miniseries or a Special	The Josephine Baker Story	Won
1992	Golden Globe Awards	Best Performance by an Actress in a Mini-Series or Motion Picture Made for TV	The Josephine Baker Story	Nominated
1992	CableACE Award	Actress in a Movie or Miniseries	The Josephine Baker Story	Nominated
1993	NAACP Image Awards	Outstanding Lead Actress in a Drama Series, Mini-Series or Television Movie	The Josephine Baker Story	Won
1998	NAACP Image Awards	Outstanding Lead Actress in a Motion Picture	Eve's Bayou	Nominated
1998	NAACP Image Awards	Outstanding Supporting Actress in a Drama Series	Touched by an Angel	Won
1999	NAACP Image Awards	Outstanding Lead Actress in a Television Movie or Mini-Series	The Wedding	Nominated
1999	Online Film & Television Association	Best Supporting Actress in a Motion Picture or Miniseries	The Color of Courage	Nominated
2000	NAACP Image Awards	Outstanding Actress in a Television Movie/Miniseries/Dramatic Special	Dangerous Evidence: The Lori Jackson Story	Nominated
2000	NAACP Image Awards	Outstanding Performance in a Youth or Children's Series/Special	The Planet of Junior Brown	Won
2000	Black Reel Awards	Network/Cable - Best Actress	Love Songs	Nominated
2004	Black Reel Awards	Television: Best Supporting Actress	The Cheetah Girls	Nominated
2005	Black Reel Awards	Best Actress, Network/Cable Television	Redemption: The Stan Tookie Williams Story	Won
2005	Women Film Critics Circle Awards	Acting and Activism Award	Redemption: The Stan Tookie Williams Story	Won
2005	NAACP Image Awards	Outstanding Actress in a Television Movie, Mini-Series or Dramatic Special	Redemption: The Stan Tookie Williams Story	Won
2016	NAACP Image Awards	Outstanding Supporting Actress in a Drama Series	Greenleaf	Nominated
2017	Gracie Awards	Actress in a Supporting Role - Drama	Greenleaf	Won
2017	Los Angeles Film Festival	Best Ensemble Cast	Solace	Won
2018	Black Reel Award	Outstanding Supporting Actress, Drama Series	Greenleaf	Nominated
2018	NAACP Image Awards	Outstanding Supporting Actress in a Drama Series	Greenleaf	Nominated
2019	NAACP Image Awards	Outstanding Supporting Actress in a Drama Series	Greenleaf	Won
2019	Black Reel Award	Outstanding Supporting Actress, Drama Series	Greenleaf	Nominated
2020	NAACP Image Awards	Outstanding Supporting Actress in a Drama Series	Greenleaf	Won
2021	NAACP Image Awards	Outstanding Supporting Actress in a Drama Series	Greenleaf	Nominated
2025	NAACP Image Awards	Outstanding Supporting Actress in a Motion Picture	Albany Road	Nominated
2025	NAACP Image Awards	Outstanding Supporting Actress in a Drama Series	The Chi	Won
