= Deep in My Heart (1999 film) =

1999 television film

- Genre: Drama
- Written by: Ronni Kern
- Directed by: Anita W. Addison
- Starring: Anne Bancroft; Lynn Whitfield; Alice Krige; Cara Buono; Gloria Reuben
- Music by: Debbie Wiseman
- Countries of origin: United States; Canada
- Original language: English

Production
- Executive producer: Frank Konigsberg
- Producers: Christine Sacani; David Yarnell
- Production locations: Toronto, Ontario, Canada
- Cinematography: Alar Kivilo
- Editor: Charles Bornstein
- Running time: 90 minutes
- Production company: The Königsberg Company

Original release
- Network: CBS
- Release: February 14, 1999

Deep in My Heart is a 1999 American drama television film directed by Anita W. Addison. It stars Anne Bancroft and Lynn Whitfield. It is based on a true story. The film was broadcast on CBS on February 14, 1999. Bancroft received a Primetime Emmy Award for Outstanding Supporting Actress in a Limited Series or Movie for her role at the 51st Primetime Emmy Awards.

== Plot ==
In Boston in the early 1960s, Geraldine Cummins was walking home alone from the movies when she was jumped and raped by a black man. Stunned, she returned home to her husband Bob, stating she had been raped. Sometime later, she finds she is pregnant. She keeps the baby for a few reasons: she is Catholic and she harbors a small hope that it could be her husband's baby. As the baby is a black girl, she fears the social isolation she would receive and what people would think of her. She is heartbroken, but decides to give up her daughter. She names her newborn daughter Barbara Anne Cummins and gives her to foster mother Corrine Burrel, a black woman in Roxbury.

Seven years later, Barbara is a happy little girl. A few months later, social worker Mrs. Marsdon comes into their home and informs Corrine that Barbara will be adopted by Annalise and Paul Jurgenson, white people living in Wisconsin. Corrine seeks legal action, looking to adopt Barbara for herself, but as she is divorced with no job and many children, she is turned down.

Annalise becomes worried about Barbara's very detached nature and suggests to Paul they move to a suburban neighborhood where Barbara could be around other black kids. Paul is angry that they have to change everything for a child he did not want, but agrees, only to leave them after moving. Barbara has once again receded into herself after the neighborhood children make fun of her for being black with a white mother. Over the years until she is 16, she is alone without her mother or friends. At 16 she meets Don Williams, a football-playing choirboy. She falls in love with him and ultimately gets pregnant.

Years later, in the middle of Barbara's third pregnancy, the doctor suggests she look into her birth family history for medical reasons. This leads her in search for her mother. She visits Corrine and later contacts the agency in charge of her adoption. By reading her adoption records, she discovers the truth about her birth and her biological mother. After a night of contemplation, she decides to seek out her birth mother.

Revitalized by the happiness of knowing she was wanted by both her birth mother and foster mother, Barbara reconciles with Annalise. Anxiously, Gerry and her three grown children wait at the airport for Barbara's arrival. Finally, after 34 years, mother and daughter meet. Barbara is angry as to why Gerry gave her up if she loves her, asking if it would have made a difference if she had been born white. Gerry says she only wanted the best for Barbara, to be with people who could teach her courage, which she could not, because Gerry felt ashamed for being raped and having a black daughter, though she loved her. Gerry apologizes to Barbara and they reconcile as mother and daughter. Later, at a family reunion, Corrine, Gerry and Annalise meet again for the first time. The film ends with a picture of the entire side of Barbara's family, her mothers, her uncles, her brothers and sisters, her children, and her nieces and nephews, and Barbara no longer feels alone.

== Cast ==
- Anne Bancroft as Geraldine "Gerry" Eileen Cummins (Barbara's birth mother)
  - Cara Buono as Young Gerry Cummins
- Lynn Whitfield as Corrine Burrell (Barbara's foster mother)
- Alice Krige as Annalise Jurgenson (Barbara's adoptive mother)
- Gloria Reuben as Barbara Ann Williams
  - Keenan Macwilliam as Young Barbara Ann Cummins
- Jesse L. Martin as Don Williams (Barbara's husband)
- Kevin O'Rourke as Robert "Bob" Cummins
  - Kiel Campbell as 10-year-old Robert Cummins
- Albert Schultz as Paul Jurgenson
- Jayne Eastwood as Mrs. Marsdon
- Philip Akin as OB-Gyn
- Moynan King as Carol Cummins
  - Brooke Belvedere as Young Carol Cummins
- Michael Capellupo as Ted Cummins
- Mpho Koaho as Roger

== Critical reception ==
William McDonald of The New York Times said the film is buoyed by "a strong supporting cast" and "[sidesteps] traps of sentimentality", though he admitted, "But what's lost in the blur is a fuller picture of the lonely racial limbo in which Barbara, as a girl, is forced to live. Instead, we have to trust her moodiness and her own testimony to understand her unhappiness."
