= King's Faith =

2013 film

- Film poster
- Directed by: Nicholas DiBella
- Starring: Crawford Wilson; Lynn Whitfield
- Release date: 26 April 2013
- Running time: 108 minutes
- Country: United States
- Language: English

King's Faith is a 2013 American drama film directed by Nicholas DiBella.

== Cast ==
- Crawford Wilson as Brendan King
- Lynn Whitfield as Vanessa Stubbs
- James McDaniel as Mike Stubbs
