= The Josephine Baker Story =

- Genre: Biography; Drama; History; Music; Romance
- Screenplay by: Ron Hutchinson
- Story by: Ron Hutchinson; Michael Zagor
- Directed by: Brian Gibson
- Starring: Lynn Whitfield; Rubén Blades; David Dukes; Craig T. Nelson; Kene Holliday; Louis Gossett Jr.
- Music by: Georges Delerue; Carolyn Dennis (singing voice: Josephine Baker)
- Country of origin: United States
- Original language: English

Production
- Executive producers: Robert Halmi Jr. Robert Halmi Sr. David Puttnam
- Producer: John Kemeny
- Cinematography: Elemér Ragályi
- Running time: 130 minutes
- Production companies: Anglia Television; HBO Pictures; Sonar Entertainment

Original release
- Network: HBO
- Release: March 16, 1991

The Josephine Baker Story is an American television film that first aired on HBO on March 16, 1991. It stars Lynn Whitfield as Josephine Baker, an international African-American star, who was especially successful in Europe. The film was generally well-received by critics and has become a success on home video and DVD. The original music score was composed by Georges Delerue.

== Plot ==
Born into a poor family in St. Louis, Josephine Baker struggles to make a name for herself on the vaudeville circuit. As her career progresses, so does her resentment of racial prejudice, motivating her to move to Paris—where in a short time, her exotic dance routines make her the toast of the town. Swayed by the influence of her manager, she takes the act back to America. It fails, but Josephine perseveres, proving herself as much humanitarian as entertainer.

== Cast ==
- Lynn Whitfield as Josephine Baker
  - Mayah McCoy as Josephine Baker (age 8)
  - Ainsley Curry as Josephine Baker (age 13)
- Rubén Blades as Count Giuseppe Pepito Abatino
- David Dukes as Jo Bouillon
- Louis Gossett Jr. as Sidney Williams
- Craig T. Nelson as Walter Winchell
- Kene Holliday as Sidney Bechet
- Vivian Bonnell as Josephine's Mother
- Vivienne Eytle as Josephine's Sister

== Production ==
Lynn Whitfield was glad to be chosen to play Josephine Baker in this movie, but she was concerned about the scene requiring her to bare her breasts to perform Baker's famous "Banana Dance". "I was nervous about what my grandmother would think," she said, but then she warmed to the idea: "It's what you think Eve would look like."

== Accolades ==
At the 43rd Primetime Emmy Awards, the film won the Outstanding Lead Actress in a Miniseries or a Special for Whitfield and the Outstanding Directing in a Miniseries or a Special for Brian Gibson. The film was also nominated for Outstanding Drama/Comedy Special and Miniseries and the Outstanding Supporting Actor in a Miniseries or a Special for both Blades and Dukes.

At the 49th Golden Globe Awards, the film was nominated for Best Limited Series, Anthology Series or Television Motion Picture, Lynn Whitfield was nominated for Best Actress - Limited Series, Anthology Series or Television Motion Picture, and Louis Gossett Jr. won Best Supporting Actor - Television.
