= Anita W. Addison =

American television director and producer

- Born: Anita Laraine Wharton Addison; September 6, 1952; Greensboro, North Carolina, United States
- Died: January 24, 2004 (aged 51); New York City, New York, United States
- Other name: Anita Addison
- Occupations: Television and film director, television producer
- Years active: 1976–2004

Anita Laraine Wharton Addison (September 6, 1952 – January 24, 2004) was an American television and film director and producer. She was one of the first African American women to be a senior producer for a major television network.

== Early life ==
Born in Greensboro, North Carolina, her parents were educators and civil rights activists. Her father, Donald Addison, was a sociology professor at North Carolina A&T. Her mother was Ruth Wharton Addison. Addison graduated from high school in Wisconsin.

== Education ==
Addison graduated from Vassar College, where she studied political science, in 1974. She then went to Columbia University, where she received a master's degree in journalism.

== Career ==
Addison began working as a journalist at People, Money, Fortune, and as a researcher for Time magazine, before embarking on a directing and producing career. She took classes at New York University's school of film. She then worked as an analyst of Nielsen ratings for a small, independent TV station in Los Angeles.

Addison produced, wrote and directed a short film called "Savannah" which was nominated for an Academy Award for best director in 1989.

In the late 1980s, she worked as a senior vice president of drama development at Lorimar before working as a producer at Warner Bros. Television.

In 1990 she earned a master's degree in fine arts from UCLA and began her career in TV and film.

From 1995 to 1998, Addison was VP of drama development at CBS. After leaving CBS, she worked on numerous television series including Family Law and EZ Streets with director and writer Paul Haggis. In 1999, she directed the television movie Deep in My Heart. Addison died on January 24, 2004, in New York City. When she died she was a producer at Paramount Television and had just finished directing the pilot for "Manhattan Valley." Haggis dedicated his Oscar-winning film Crash to Addison.

She was seriously involved in the L.A Rebellion, an African-American film movement that took place at UCLA.

== Personal life ==
Addison had an younger brother, Donald Addison, and a younger sister, Alveta Addison. She also had a partner for 8 years, David Byrd.

== Death ==
Addison was in New York City working on a television series when she became ill in mid-January. She was admitted to New York-Presbyterian hospital, and died a week later. There was no funeral or memorial held at the time she died. Her body was donated to science, and people were encouraged to make donations in her memory to their favorite causes. The cause of death was breast cancer. Paul Haggis made a tribute to her in his movie Crash (2004 film).

== Selected filmography ==
=== Director ===
- Eva's Man (1976)
- Quantum Leap (2 episodes, 1991-1992)
- Freddy's Nightmares (1 episode, 1990)
- Deep In My Heart
- Knots Landing (1 episode, 1991)
- Sisters (1 episode, 1991)
- There Are No Children Here (1993)
- ER (1 episode, 1995)
- EZ Streets (1 episode, 1997)
- Judging Amy (1 episode, 2000)

=== Producer ===
- Sisters (7 episodes, 1991)
- It Had to Be You (1993)
- That's Life (Executive producer) (22 episodes, 2001–02)
- Copshop (2004)
