= List of awards and nominations received by Randy Newman =

Randy Newman awards and nominations
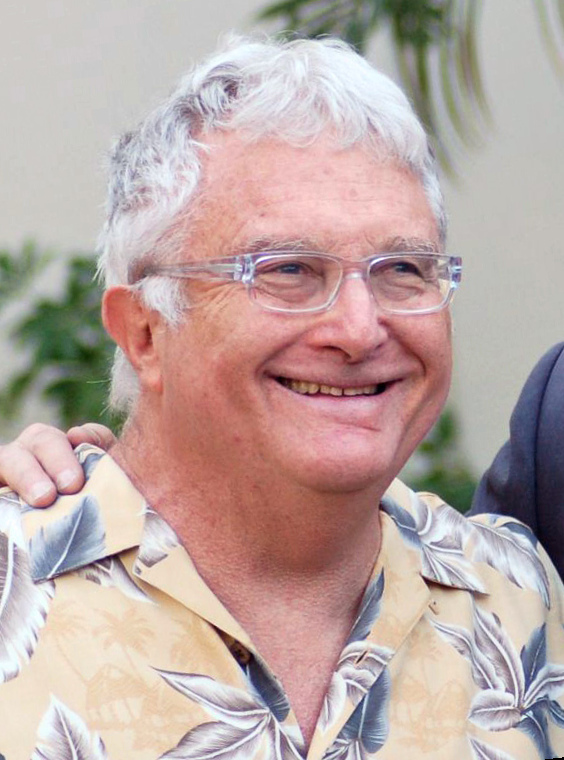
Newman in 2012
Awards and nominations
Award	Wins	Nominations
Totals
Academy Awards	2	22
Annie Awards	4	8
Austin Film Critics Association	0	1
Black Reel Awards	1	2
British Academy Film Awards	0	1
Chicago Film Critics Association	1	4
Chicago Indie Critics Awards	0	1
Columbus Film Critics Association	0	1
Critics' Choice Movie Awards	0	4
DiscussingFilm Critic Awards	0	1
Florida Film Critics Circle	0	1
Golden Globe Awards	0	7
Grammy Awards	7	24
Greater Western New York Film Critics Association	1	1
Hawaii Film Critics Society	1	1
Hollywood Film Awards	1	1
Hollywood Music in Media Awards	0	1
om|2}}
International Cinephile Society	0	1
International Film Music Critics Association	1	6
Las Vegas Film Critics Society	0	2
Los Angeles Film Critics Association	1	2
Latino Entertainment Journalists Association	0	1
North Carolina Film Critics Association	0	1
North Dakota Film Society	0	2
Online Film & Television Association	1	6
Online Film Critics Society	1	2
Phoenix Film Critics Society	0	2
Primetime Emmy Awards	3	3
San Francisco Bay Area Film Critics Circle	0	1
Satellite Awards	0	7
Saturn Awards	0	1
St. Louis Film Critics Association	0	2
Washington D.C. Area Film Critics Association	0	1
World Soundtrack Awards	3	6
Wins	28
Nominations	126

Randy Newman is an American singer-songwriter, arranger, composer, and pianist. Over his career he has received numerous accolades including two Academy Awards, three Primetime Emmy Awards, and seven Grammy Awards (including the Governor's Award from The Recording Academy) as well as nominations for a British Academy Film Award, three Critics' Choice Movie Awards and seven Golden Globe Awards.

He has been nominated for 22 Academy Awards, winning twice for Best Original Song in 2002 for "If I Didn't Have You" (from Monsters, Inc.) and in 2011 for "We Belong Together" (from Toy Story 3). Newman has received twenty-two Academy Award nominations in the Best Original Score and Best Original Song categories and has won twice in the latter category, contributing to the Newmans being the most nominated Academy Award extended family, with a collective 92 nominations in various music categories.

Newman was inducted into the Songwriters Hall of Fame in 2002. In 2007, he was inducted as a Disney Legend. In 2010, he received a star on the Hollywood Walk of Fame. Newman was inducted to the Rock and Roll Hall of Fame in 2013. Newman received a Max Steiner Film Music Achievement Award and performed at the music gala Hollywood in Vienna for the first time together with his cousin David Newman in 2014.

== Major awards ==
=== Academy Awards ===
Year	Category	Nominated work	Result	Ref.
1981	Best Original Score	Ragtime	Nominated	
1981	Best Original Song	"One More Hour" (from Ragtime)	Nominated	
1984	Best Original Score	The Natural	Nominated	
1989	Best Original Song	"I Love to See You Smile" (from Parenthood)	Nominated	
1990	Best Original Score	Avalon	Nominated	
1994	Best Original Song	"Make Up Your Mind" (from The Paper)	Nominated	
1995	Best Original Musical or Comedy Score	Toy Story	Nominated	
1995	Best Original Song	"You've Got a Friend in Me" (from Toy Story)	Nominated	
1996	Best Original Musical or Comedy Score	James and the Giant Peach	Nominated	
1998	Best Original Dramatic Score	Pleasantville	Nominated	
1998	Best Original Musical or Comedy Score	A Bug's Life	Nominated	
1998	Best Original Song	"That'll Do" (from Babe: Pig in the City)	Nominated	
1999	Best Original Song	"When She Loved Me" (from Toy Story 2)	Nominated	
2000	Best Original Song	"A Fool in Love" (from Meet the Parents)	Nominated	
2001	Best Original Score	Monsters, Inc.	Nominated	
2001	Best Original Song	"If I Didn't Have You" (from Monsters, Inc.)	Won	
2006	Best Original Song	"Our Town" (from Cars)	Nominated	
2009	Best Original Song	"Almost There" (from The Princess and the Frog)	Nominated	
2009	Best Original Song	"Down in New Orleans" (from The Princess and the Frog)	Nominated	
2010	Best Original Song	"We Belong Together" (from Toy Story 3)	Won	
2019	Best Original Song	"I Can't Let You Throw Yourself Away" (from Toy Story 4)	Nominated	
2019	Best Original Score	Marriage Story	Nominated	

=== BAFTA Awards ===
Year	Category	Nominated work	Result	Ref.
British Academy Film Awards
1982	Best Original Song Written for a Film	"One More Hour" (from Ragtime)	Nominated	

=== Critics' Choice Awards ===
Year	Category	Nominated work	Result	Ref.
Critics' Choice Movie Awards
2009	Best Score	The Princess and the Frog	Nominated	
2009	Best Song	"Almost There" (from The Princess and the Frog)	Nominated	
2010	Best Song	"We Belong Together" (from Toy Story 3)	Nominated	
2019	Best Score	Marriage Story	Nominated	

=== Emmy Awards ===
Year	Category	Nominated work	Result	Ref.
Primetime Emmy Awards
1991	Outstanding Achievement in Music and Lyrics	"He's Guilty!" (from Cop Rock: "Pilot")	Won	
2004	Outstanding Main Title Theme Music	"It's a Jungle Out There" (from Monk)	Won	
2010	Outstanding Original Music and Lyrics	"When I'm Gone" (from Monk: "Mr. Monk and the End, Part 2")	Won	

=== Golden Globe Awards ===
Year	Category	Nominated work	Result	Ref.
1981	Best Original Song	"One More Hour" (from Ragtime)	Nominated	
1989	Best Original Song	"I Love to See You Smile" (from Parenthood)	Nominated	
1990	Best Original Score	Avalon	Nominated	
1995	Best Original Song	"You've Got a Friend in Me" (from Toy Story)	Nominated	
1998	Best Original Score	A Bug's Life	Nominated	
1999	Best Original Song	"When She Loved Me" (from Toy Story 2)	Nominated	
2019	Best Original Score	Marriage Story	Nominated	

=== Grammy Awards ===
Year	Category	Nominated work	Result	Ref.
1969	Best Arrangement Accompanying Vocalist(s)	"Is That All There Is?" (by Peggy Lee)	Nominated	
1982	Best Album of Original Score Written for a Motion Picture or a Television Special	Ragtime	Nominated	
1984	Best Instrumental Composition	The Natural	Won (Note: Tied with John Williams for "Olympic Fanfare and Theme".)	
1984	Best Pop Instrumental Performance	"The Natural" (from The Natural)	Nominated	
1989	Best Song Written Specifically for a Motion Picture or for Television	"I Love to See You Smile" (from Parenthood)	Nominated	
1991	Best Instrumental Composition Written for a Motion Picture or for Television	Avalon	Nominated	
1991	Best Instrumental Composition Written for a Motion Picture or for Television	Awakenings	Nominated	
1996	Best Country Collaboration with Vocals	"Long Tall Texan" (with Lyle Lovett)	Nominated	
1999	Best Instrumental Composition Written for a Motion Picture, Television or Other Visual Media	A Bug's Life	Won	
1999	Best Song Written for a Motion Picture, Television or Other Visual Media	"The Time of Your Life" (from A Bug's Life)	Nominated	
2000	Best Score Soundtrack Album for a Motion Picture, Television or Other Visual Media	Toy Story 2	Nominated	
2000	Best Song Written for a Motion Picture, Television or Other Visual Media	"When She Loved Me" (from Toy Story 2)	Won	
2002	Best Score Soundtrack Album for a Motion Picture, Television or Other Visual Media	Monsters, Inc.	Nominated	
2002	Best Song Written for a Motion Picture, Television or Other Visual Media	"If I Didn't Have You" (from Monsters, Inc.)	Won	
2002	Best Instrumental Composition	"The Ride of the Doors" (from Monsters, Inc.)	Nominated	
2003	Best Pop Instrumental Performance	"Seabiscuit" (from Seabiscuit)	Nominated	
2003	Best Score Soundtrack Album for a Motion Picture, Television or Other Visual Media	Seabiscuit	Nominated	
2006	Best Compilation Soundtrack Album for Motion Pictures, Television or Other Visual Media	Cars	Nominated	
2006	Best Song Written for a Motion Picture, Television or Other Visual Media	"Our Town" (from Cars)	Won	
2010	Best Score Soundtrack Album for a Motion Picture, Television or Other Visual Media	Toy Story 3	Won	
2010	Best Song Written for a Motion Picture, Television or Other Visual Media	"Down in New Orleans" (from The Princess and the Frog)	Nominated	
2017	Best Arrangement, Instrumental and Vocals	"Putin"	Won	
2019	Best Song Written for Visual Media	"The Ballad of the Lonesome Cowboy" (from Toy Story 4)	Nominated	
2025	Best American Roots Performance	"Lonely Avenue" (with Jon Batiste)	Nominated	

== Miscellaneous awards ==
Year	Association	Category	Film	Result	Ref.
1996	Annie Awards	Outstanding Achievement for Music in an Animated Feature	Toy Story	Won	
1996	Annie Awards	Outstanding Achievement for Music in an Animated Feature	James and the Giant Peach	Nominated	
1997	Annie Awards	Outstanding Achievement for Music in an Animated Feature	Cats Don't Dance	Won	
2000	Annie Awards	Outstanding Achievement for Music in an Animated Feature	Toy Story 2	Won	
2002	Annie Awards	Outstanding Achievement for Music in an Animated Feature	Monsters, Inc.	Nominated	
2006	Annie Awards	Outstanding Achievement for Music in an Animated Feature	Cars	Won	
2013	Annie Awards	Outstanding Achievement for Music in an Animated Feature	Monsters University	Nominated	
2019	Annie Awards	Outstanding Achievement for Music in an Animated Feature	Toy Story 4	Nominated	
2009	Black Reel Awards	Outstanding Original Song	"Almost There" (from The Princess and the Frog)	Won	
2009	Black Reel Awards	Outstanding Original Song	"Down in New Orleans" (from The Princess and the Frog)	Nominated	
2019	Hollywood Film Awards	Hollywood Film Composer Award	Marriage Story	Won	
2019	Hollywood Music in Media Awards	Best Original Score – Feature Film	Marriage Story	Nominated	
2019	International Cinephile Society	Best Original Score	Marriage Story	Nominated	
1998	Online Film & Television Association	Best Original Musical or Comedy Score	Pleasantville	Nominated	
1998	Online Film & Television Association	Best Original Family Score	A Bug's Life	Nominated	
1999	Online Film & Television Association	Best Original Song	"When She Loved Me" (from Toy Story 2)	Nominated	
2001	Online Film & Television Association	Film Hall of Fame: Support	—N/a	Inducted	
2009	Online Film & Television Association	Best Original Song	"Almost There" (from The Princess and the Frog)	Nominated	
2010	Online Film & Television Association	Best Original Song	"We Belong Together" (from Toy Story 3)	Won	
2019	Online Film & Television Association	Best Original Score	Marriage Story	Nominated	
1998	Satellite Awards	Best Original Score	Pleasantville	Nominated	
1998	Satellite Awards	Best Original Song	"That'll Do" (from Babe: Pig in the City)	Nominated	
2003	Satellite Awards	Best Original Score	Seabiscuit	Nominated	
2009	Satellite Awards	Best Original Song	"Almost There" (from The Princess and the Frog)	Nominated	
2009	Satellite Awards	Best Original Song	"Down in New Orleans" (from The Princess and the Frog)	Nominated	
2019	Satellite Awards	Best Original Song	"The Ballad of the Lonesome Cowboy" (from Toy Story 4)	Nominated	
2019	Satellite Awards	Best Original Score	Marriage Story	Nominated	
1999	Saturn Awards	Best Music	Toy Story 2	Nominated	
2002	World Soundtrack Awards	Soundtrack Composer of the Year	Monsters, Inc.	Nominated	
2002	World Soundtrack Awards	Best Original Soundtrack of the Year	Monsters, Inc.	Nominated	
2002	World Soundtrack Awards	Best Original Song Written for a Film	"If I Didn't Have You" (from Monsters, Inc.)	Won	
2006	World Soundtrack Awards	Best Original Song Written for a Film	"Our Town" (from Cars)	Won	
2010	World Soundtrack Awards	Best Original Song Written for a Film	"Almost There" (from The Princess and the Frog)	Nominated	
2011	World Soundtrack Awards	Best Original Song Written for a Film	"We Belong Together" (from Toy Story 3)	Won	

== Critics associations ==
Year	Association	Category	Film	Result	Ref.
2019	Austin Film Critics Association	Best Score	Marriage Story	Nominated	
1995	Chicago Film Critics Association	Best Original Score	Toy Story	Won	
1996	Chicago Film Critics Association	Best Original Score	James and the Giant Peach	Nominated	
1998	Chicago Film Critics Association	Best Original Score	A Bug's Life	Nominated	
2019	Chicago Film Critics Association	Best Original Score	Marriage Story	Nominated	
2019	Chicago Indie Critics	Best Original Score	Marriage Story	Nominated	
2019	Columbus Film Critics Association	Best Score	Marriage Story	Nominated	
2019	Florida Film Critics Circle	Best Score	Marriage Story	Nominated	
2019	Greater Western New York Film Critics Association	Best Score	Marriage Story	Won	
2019	Hawaii Film Critics Society	Best Score	Marriage Story	Won	
2009	Houston Film Critics Society	Best Original Song	"Almost There" (from The Princess and the Frog)	Nominated	
2019	Houston Film Critics Society	Best Original Score	Marriage Story	Nominated	
1998	International Film Music Critics Association	Best Original Score for a Comedy Film	A Bug's Life	Won	
1998	International Film Music Critics Association	Best Original Score for a Drama Film	Pleasantville	Nominated	
2006	International Film Music Critics Association	Best Original Score for an Animated Film	Cars	Nominated	
2008	International Film Music Critics Association	Best Original Score for a Comedy Film	Leatherheads	Nominated	
2009	International Film Music Critics Association	Best Original Score for an Animated Film	The Princess and the Frog	Nominated	
2010	International Film Music Critics Association	Best Original Score for an Animated Film	Toy Story 3	Nominated	
1999	Las Vegas Film Critics Society	Best Original Song	"When She Loved Me" (from Toy Story 2)	Nominated	
2000	Las Vegas Film Critics Society	Best Original Song	"Meet the Parents" (from Meet the Parents)	Nominated	
1981	Los Angeles Film Critics Association	Best Music Score	"One More Hour" (from Ragtime)	Won	
1990	Los Angeles Film Critics Association	Best Music Score	Avalon	Runner-up	
2019	Latino Entertainment Journalists Association	Best Score	Marriage Story	Nominated	
2019	New York Film Critics Circle	Special Award	—N/a	Honored	
2019	North Carolina Film Critics Association	Best Music	Marriage Story	Nominated	
2019	North Dakota Film Society	Best Original Score	Marriage Story	Nominated	
2019	North Dakota Film Society	Best Original Song	"I Can't Let You Throw Yourself Away" (from Toy Story 4)	Nominated	
1998	Online Film Critics Society	Best Original Score	Pleasantville	Won	
2019	Online Film Critics Society	Best Original Score	Marriage Story	Nominated	
2001	Phoenix Film Critics Society	Best Original Song	"If I Didn't Have You" (from Monsters, Inc.)	Nominated	
2010	Phoenix Film Critics Society	Best Original Song	"We Belong Together" (from Toy Story 3)	Nominated	
2019	San Francisco Bay Area Film Critics Circle	Best Original Score	Marriage Story	Nominated	
2009	St. Louis Gateway Film Critics Association	Best Music	The Princess and the Frog	Nominated	
2019	St. Louis Gateway Film Critics Association	Best Score	Marriage Story	Nominated	
2019	Washington D.C. Area Film Critics Association	Best Original Score	Marriage Story	Nominated	

== Honorary awards ==
Year	Association	Category	Result	Ref.
2007	Disney Legends Awards	Disney Legends Awards	Inducted	
2010	Hollywood Walk of Fame	Star on the Hollywood Walk of Fame	Inducted	
2014	Hollywood in Vienna	Max Steiner Film Music Achievement Award	Honored	
2013	Rock and Roll Hall of Fame	Induction into the Rock and Roll Hall of Fame	Inducted	
2002	Songwriters Hall of Fame	Induction into the Songwriters Hall of Fame	Inducted	
