= Tiana's Bayou Adventure =

Log flume at Magic Kingdom and Disneyland

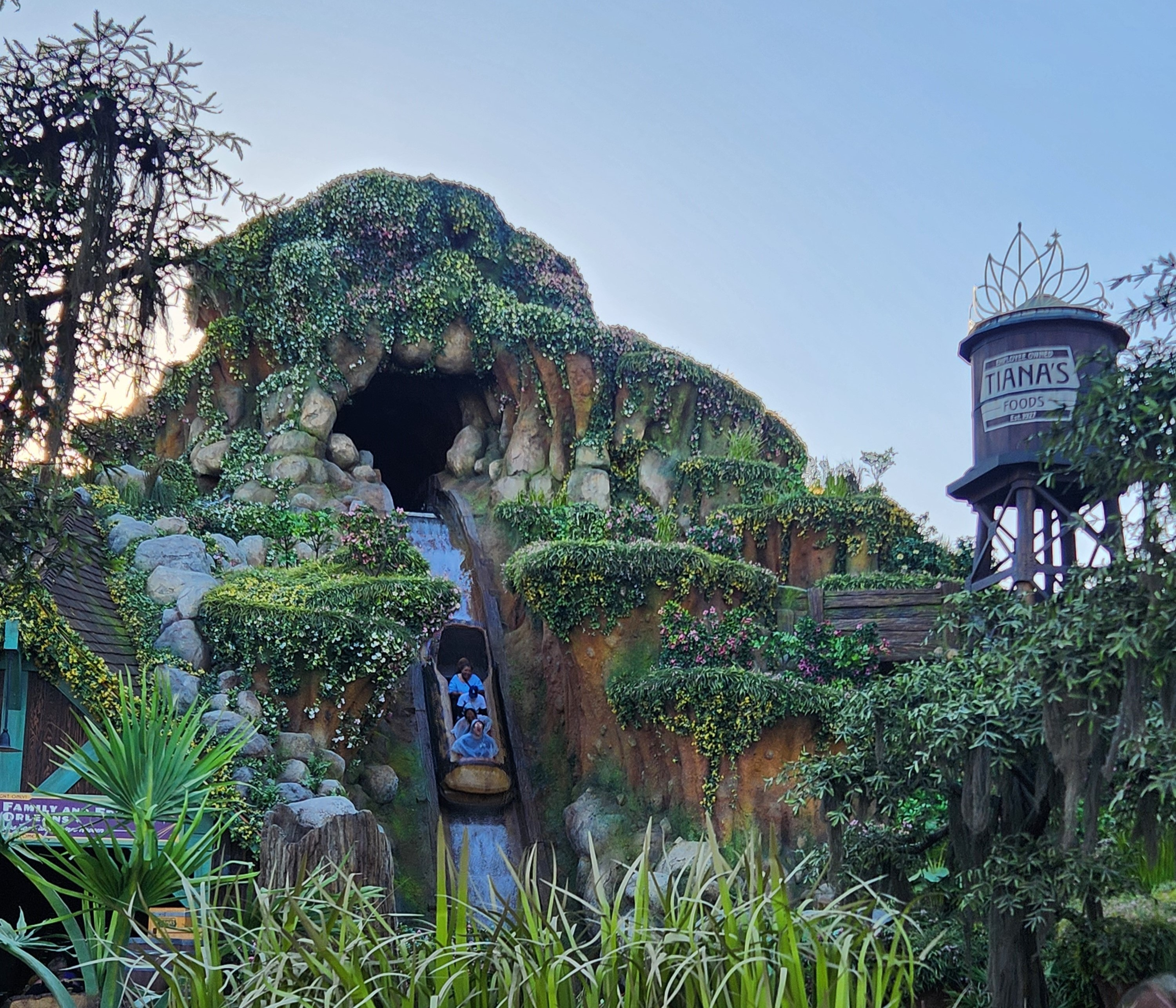
- The attraction at Disneyland

Magic Kingdom
- Area: Frontierland
- Status: Closed for refurbishment until December 18, 2026
- Opening date: June 28, 2024
- Replaced: Splash Mountain

Disneyland
- Area: Bayou Country
- Status: Operating
- Opening date: November 15, 2024
- Replaced: Splash Mountain

General statistics
- Type: Log flume
- Designer: Walt Disney Imagineering
- Height restriction: 40 in (102 cm)
- Theme: The Princess and the Frog
- Lightning Lane available
- Single rider line available
- Must transfer from wheelchair

Tiana's Bayou Adventure is a log flume attraction at Magic Kingdom and Disneyland. It is based on Walt Disney Animation Studios' 2009 film The Princess and the Frog. The ride experience begins with an outdoor float-through that leads to indoor dark ride segments, with a climactic steep drop followed by an indoor finale. The drop is 52.5 feet (16.0 meters). The attraction, which replaced Splash Mountain, opened on June 28, 2024 at Magic Kingdom and on November 15, 2024 at Disneyland.

== Development ==
In June 2020, it was announced that the Splash Mountain attraction themed to Disney's 1946 film Song of the South, which opened in 1989 and 1992 at Disneyland and Magic Kingdom respectively, would be rethemed based on Disney Animation's 2009 film The Princess and the Frog. Disney stated that the development of the project began in 2019, prior to the online petitions that were circulated during the George Floyd protests. There had been renewed scrutiny of Song of the South, which is "rarely aired or shown" in the U.S. due to its controversial aspects. It has been considered by critics as portraying African Americans as stereotypes, making them appear content with plantation life in the post-Civil War South. At the time of the film's release, the NAACP protested its subject matter. Walt Disney Imagineering based Splash Mountain on the animated portions of the film, which the company felt at the time would leave them unaffected by these issues.

The New York Times reported that Disney executives had privately discussed removing the attraction's Song of the South theme for at least five years, before putting into development a theme based on The Princess and the Frog. During the month of the announcement, in an interview with the Walt Disney Company's official fan club D23, Bob Weis, (then-president of Walt Disney Imagineering) stated that Splash Mountain "has been the subject of many conversations through the years. Its brilliant ride platform and landscape create the potential for great storytelling." On the subject of retheming an attraction instead of building a new one, he said "We have a longstanding history of enhancing attractions with 'new magic,' like Pirates of the Caribbean, and completely retheming others, like Guardians of the Galaxy – Mission: BREAKOUT! We completely understand that these decisions aren't always popular, but I think our biggest fans know that we care as much as they do."

The project was led by Imagineer Senior Creative Producer Charita Carter while Splash Mountain Imagineer Tony Baxter returned as a creative advisor. Imagineer Carmen Smith, senior vice president of inclusion strategies, later stated, in reference to the murder of George Floyd and the COVID-19 pandemic; "the world changed, [...] Life kind of lets you know when it's time for something to give birth to a concept, and it was without hesitation that leadership came together and said, 'You've been working on it, you've got a good idea. Let's move forward on this.'"

In August 2021, new artwork and details for the retheme were revealed. In July 2022, during the Essence Music Festival in New Orleans, Disney announced that the ride would be called Tiana's Bayou Adventure, setting an opening date of "late 2024" at both parks.

At the D23 Expo in September 2022, it was announced that Anika Noni Rose, Bruno Campos, Michael-Leon Wooley, and Jenifer Lewis would be reprising their roles of Princess Tiana, Prince Naveen, Louis, and Mama Odie respectively, from The Princess and the Frog for the attraction.

In December 2022, new artwork was unveiled and it was announced that the Magic Kingdom version of Splash Mountain would close on January 23, 2023. In April 2023, it was announced that Tiana's Bayou Adventure would include "dozens" of new Audio-Animatronics figures and that the Disneyland version of Splash Mountain would close on May 31, 2023. In addition to Audio-Animatronics, the ride features animation provided by Walt Disney Animation Studios. In February 2024, a preview video of a Tiana Audio-Animatronics figure was released. In April 2024, the first episode of the video series "We Call It Imagineering" on YouTube gave an in-depth look at several of the other Audio-Animatronics figures. In total, there are 48 Audio-Animatronics figures in the attraction.

Since the setting of Tiana's Bayou Adventure is New Orleans, which is a flat city, the attraction's elevation is explained by having it be on a salt dome. The Imagineers took inspiration from Avery Island in Louisiana. In addition, the new characters for the ride were designed by Imagineer Laura West, while Eric Goldberg, who animated Louis in the film, was consulted for the character's inclusion. Besides the animal musicians, the ride also includes new characters Gloria and Delores the frogs and Lari the nine-banded armadillo.

To prepare for the attraction, the Imagineering team took several research trips to Louisiana, visiting locations such as the French Market and bayous, consulted with cultural institutions, chefs, academics, musicians, and experienced Mardi Gras in New Orleans. The Imagineers also commissioned New Orleans artist Sharika Mahdi to create four paintings, each with a different theme, to serve as inspiration for the attraction.

The attraction's music was provided by Grammy award-winning New Orleans musicians PJ Morton and Terence Blanchard. Morton wrote a song, "Special Spice", while Blanchard provided the queue music. Blanchard previously provided Louis' trumpet playing in the film. Morton and Blanchard also utilized music from the film, which was composed by Randy Newman.

The attraction's queue includes a mural designed by Louisiana artist Malaika Favorite. In addition, the exterior of the attraction includes a weathervane crafted by Louisiana blacksmiths Darryl Reeves and Karina Roca.

On May 12, 2024, during Disney Night on American Idol, it was announced that Tiana's Bayou Adventure would open at Magic Kingdom on June 28, 2024.

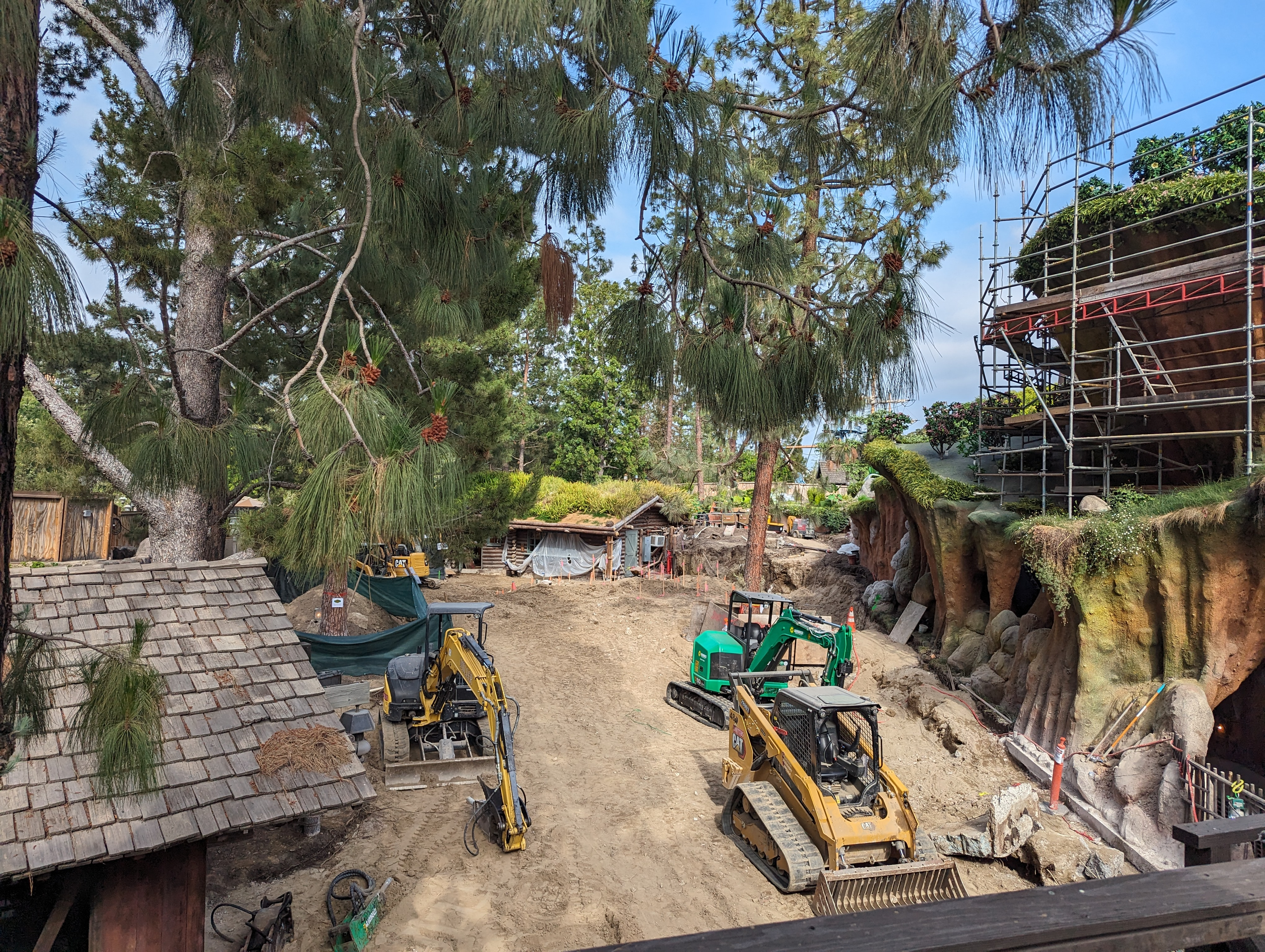
Construction of Tiana's Bayou Adventure in Disneyland in May 2024

In June 2024, on the subject of the ride's final drop, Carter stated: "this particular flume configuration has always been a rite-of-passage type attraction for young kids, [...] when you think about Tiana [...] she's inviting and welcoming and wanting everyone to participate, we thought by celebrating [the drop] and making it a fun challenge, we were opening it up to a wider audience." Smith stated that they wanted park guests to feel a sense of celebration with the drop instead of apprehension; "It is a rite of passage, but you're going to this moment, to this place, to be at a party."

During D23: The Ultimate Disney Fan Event in August 2024, it was announced that Tiana's Bayou Adventure would open at Disneyland on November 15, 2024. To coincide with the opening, Critter Country (the area at Disneyland where Splash Mountain was located) was renamed Bayou Country.

== Attraction ==
At Magic Kingdom, Tiana's Bayou Adventure is located in Frontierland, while at Disneyland it is located in Bayou Country. The attraction is set a year after the events of The Princess and the Frog. To help her community, Tiana has created an employee-owned food cooperative called Tiana's Foods, built on a salt dome that she has purchased. On the day that guests visit, it is Carnival season and Tiana is hosting a celebration for the people of New Orleans. Due to a mix-up, her celebration is missing a band and she needs the guests' help to find one, as they join her and Louis on a trip to the bayou to search for critter musicians.

In the attraction's queue Tiana, Naveen, and Louis can occasionally be heard over the PA system, discussing plans for Tiana and Louis to go out into the bayou with guests to search for musicians, while Naveen stays behind to help set up for the party.

=== Ride experience ===
Both versions of the ride have the same scenes and a similar layout. At Magic Kingdom, the ride vehicles move at a slower pace and there is more space between the scenes, while at Disneyland, the vehicles move at a faster pace and the scenes are closer to each other.

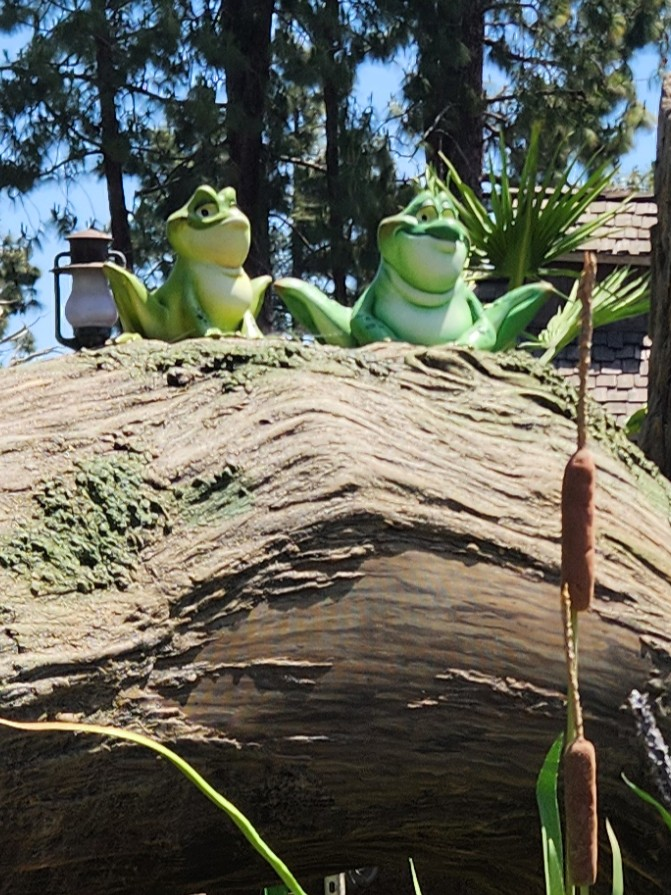
Frogs Gloria and Delores are two of the new characters for the ride (pictured in Disneyland)

After walking through the offices of Tiana's Foods, guests board a log-shaped vehicle. At Magic Kingdom, passengers are seated side-by-side, while at Disneyland, passengers are seated single-file. The vehicle departs the loading area and proceeds up a lift hill before floating through scenery designed to evoke the feeling of a Louisiana bayou while "Down in New Orleans" plays.

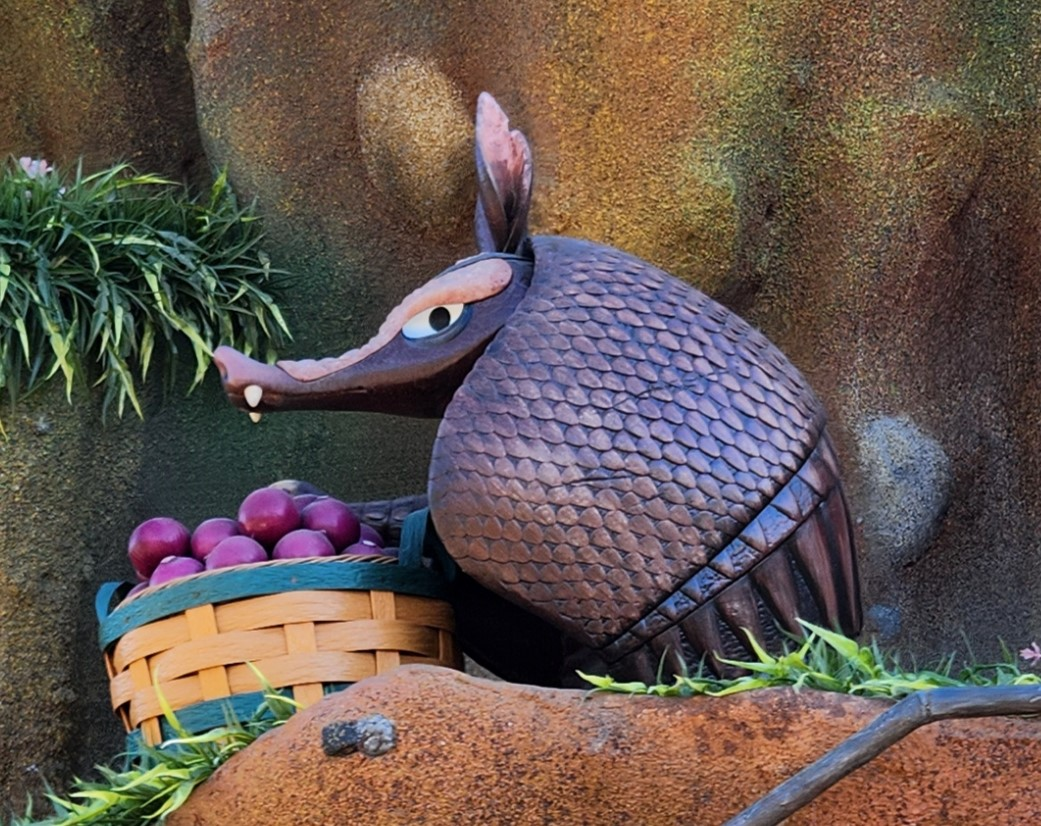
Lari the nine-banded armadillo is one of the new characters for the ride (pictured in Disneyland)

The vehicle ascends up a second lift hill inside of a mill-house where Tiana greets riders and tells them that they need to meet up with Louis to find musicians for their celebration. The vehicle passes through the Tiana's Foods gardens while "Almost There" plays. Louis can be seen in some stalks searching for musicians (at Disneyland, after the vehicle then turns a corner, riders can soon hear the voices of Louis and Tiana; Louis expresses concern that they have not yet found musicians, and Tiana assures him that they will find what they need.) Riders then come upon a waterfall, as Mama Odie can be heard from inside her home saying to riders "If you're looking for musicians, you don't have far to go!" before they drop down.

After the short drop down the waterfall, riders enter the indoor portion of the attraction, a nighttime bayou where Tiana and Louis find a Zydeco band consisting of Byhalia the beaver, Gritty the rabbit, Beau the opossum, Apollo the raccoon, Rufus the turtle, and Timoléon the otter playing an instrumental version of "Gonna Take You There". After this, Tiana and Louis find a Rara band consisting of Phina the gray fox, bobcat family Pawpaw and Octavia, and black bear family Claude, Bernadette, and Sebastián playing an instrumental version of "Gonna Take You There" as well.

Mama Odie then uses her magic to shrink the riders down to a tiny size. The vehicle reaches a dark tunnel with a beam of light shooting different colors followed by a dip-drop before becoming tiny. Dropping into the "Ranitas Verdes Club", riders find an Afro-Cuban jazz band consisting of frogs Mondo, Mayra, Felipe, and Isabel playing "Dig a Little Deeper". Tiana and Louis observe them through a hole, and fireflies are seen dancing. After this, Mama Odie returns the riders to their normal size as they begin their ascent up the final lift hill, and she tells them that they will be at the party in no time.

The vehicle descends the 52-foot (16 m) drop at a 45-degree angle, reaching a maximum speed of 40 mph. After the drop, an instrumental version of "Almost There" plays as the vehicle travels through another outdoor flume segment, and riders then arrive at the party at Tiana and Naveen's home, where Tiana is singing "Special Spice". She is accompanied by Louis and all of the animal bands, as well as Naveen playing a ukulele and his little brother Ralphie playing the drums. Also in attendance are Charlotte La Bouff and Eudora. In addition, Eli "Big Daddy" La Bouff and the King and Queen of Maldonia can be seen among the party guests through the conservatory windows. The vehicle then passes by a view of the Tiana's Palace restaurant in the distance. Mama Odie, standing farther away from the others, makes comments to the riders and keeps Juju from trying to steal her beignets.

== Voice cast ==
- Anika Noni Rose as Tiana
- Jenifer Lewis as Mama Odie
- Michael-Leon Wooley as Louis
- Bruno Campos as Prince Naveen (preshow)

== Soundtrack ==
=== Queue music ===
The following songs can be heard in the queue;

- "Basin Street Blues" (Terence Blanchard)
- "The Second Line" (Julian Gosin)
- "Down in New Orleans" (Victor Goines)
- "Tailgate Ramble" (Charlie Gabriel)
- "St. James Infirmary" (Ronell Johnson, Mark Braud)
- "Louisiana Fairytale" (Clinton Maegden)
- "When We're Human" (Terence Blanchard)
- "Bourbon Street Parade" (Mark Braud)
- "El La Bas" (Ronell Johnson)
- "Big Chief" (Kyle Roussel, Ivan Neville)
- "Li'l Liza Jane" (Herlin Riley)
- "Gonna Take You There" (Terrance Simien)
- "Doctor Jazz" (Kyle Roussel, Mark Braud)
- "They All Ask'd for You" (Gregory Davis)
- "Ma Belle Evangeline" (Terence Blanchard)
- "Do You Know What It Means to Miss New Orleans" (Leah Chase Kamata)
- "It Ain't My Fault" (Tiana's Bayou Adventure Cast)

=== Ride music ===
The following songs are featured in the ride;

- "Down in New Orleans" (written by Randy Newman)
- "Almost There" (written by Randy Newman)
- "Gonna Take You There" (written by Randy Newman)
- "Dig a Little Deeper" (written by Randy Newman)
- "Special Spice" (written by PJ Morton)

"Special Spice", the original song written for the attraction, was made available on streaming music platforms on May 31, 2024.

== Incidents ==
In June 2026, while riding the attraction at Disneyland, a 13 year old boy stood up and fell during the 50 foot drop. He was taken to the hospital and was released. Following this as well as other incidents in which guests were standing up during the ride, in August 2026 Disneyland installed various warning signs in the queue emphasizing that "Failure to stay seated will result in removal from the park".
