= Friends on the Other Side =

Song by Keith David

from the album The Princess and the Frog
- Released: November 23, 2009
- Genre: Jazz; soul; zydeco; R&B
- Length: 3:35
- Label: Walt Disney
- Songwriter: Randy Newman
- Producer: Randy Newman

"Friends on the Other Side" is a song from Disney Animation's 2009 film The Princess and the Frog. It was written by Randy Newman and is sung by Keith David, the voice of the film's villain, Doctor Facilier. It depicts Facilier beginning his plan to take over New Orleans by first deceiving Prince Naveen while at the same time getting his valet, Lawrence, to become his ally. This song is reprised later in the film when he fails his voodoo spirit accomplices, a.k.a. the 'Friends on the Other Side' of the bargain deal, and he, along with his shadow, are being dragged into the voodoo spirit world.

== Production ==
The song shares many similarities with Ursula's "Poor Unfortunate Souls" in The Little Mermaid, both being sung by villains who claim to do business by helping make the dreams of others come true when in reality, they're doing what they do for their own benefit and delight, and both are used as means to deceive the protagonists (both, coincidentally, being royals) into making deals with them, and both songs ending with the protagonist undergoing a mystical transformation that will last for nearly most of the film.

== Synopsis ==
Dr. Facilier is envious at just how much wealth is owned by Eli "Big Daddy" La Bouff. He decides there must be a way to make himself just as wealthy as Eli. Facilier follows Big Daddy and his daughter, Charlotte La Bouff, into a cafe, where they discuss the arrival of a foreign prince, Prince Naveen. A lovesick Charlotte looks to marry Naveen and shares her excitement with a waitress named Tiana. While lurking in the shadows, Facilier eavesdrops on the conversation and plots to use Charlotte and Naveen's union to seize the La Bouff fortune.

He leads Naveen and Lawrence into his shop and bids them sit down at a table for a Tarot reading. While performing tricks with his Tarot cards, Facilier reads Naveen and Lawrence's situations: Naveen has been cut off from his parents' money and needs to marry a rich young lady, while Lawrence has apparently been "pushed around all [his] life", primarily by his family. However, at the end of each reading, Facilier prognosticates that their situation will change, using deliberately ambiguous wording such as "wanting to be free" and "hop from place to place": Naveen will receive "green." The word "green" implies 3 things - money, Naveen's green color as a frog, and the green color of Tiana's dress. Lawrence, however, will become "exactly the man [he] always wanted to be", both referencing Lawrence's envy of Naveen's carefree life as a prince and Lawrence's later physical transformation into Naveen. Facilier pleads for both of them to shake his hand, and grins evilly as they do, sealing a contract with him and summoning his "Friends on the Other Side", who take the form of voodoo dolls, masks, and shrunken heads. Retrieving a talisman from the largest mask Friend, Facilier uses it to prick Naveen's finger and take his blood, starting his transformation. Lawrence is terrified as his master shrinks down into the form of a frog, as Facilier exults with dancing and fireworks with his friends saying that they got what they wanted but lost what they had, before the camera fades to black with a warning of "Hush..." from the magician.

=== Reprise ===
Tiana tries to destroy the talisman Facilier received in the original to lock away Naveen's blood, but Facilier's shadow grabs it and hands it back to the doctor. A sadistic Facilier then transforms Tiana back into a frog, before taunting her by declaring that she will now spend the rest of her life as a frog. Tiana regains the talisman by grabbing hold of it with her elastic, frog tongue, and destroys it before Facilier can stop her. Upon doing so, Facilier falls into a state of immediate panic and frantically tries to recollect the pieces of the broken talisman, just as his "Friends from the Other Side" arrive, announcing their intentions to collect the doctor's soul as punishment for his failure to repay his debt.

A horrified Dr. Facilier tries to persuade his former voodoo spirits accomplice to provide him with another opportunity to redeem himself since he still had Naveen captured and needed more time. Despite telling them the truth, they are not persuaded as he makes an attempt to escape, but the spirits grab ahold of his shadow, thus capturing Facilier as well, subsequently dragging him into the voodoo spirit world, where his soul will be doomed to remain for all eternity. With a flash of light, both Dr. Facilier and the spirits vanish, leaving behind only a tombstone with Facilier's name and horrified face engraved onto it, confirming the witch doctor's death.

== Critical reception ==
The Telegraph describes it as a "trippy voodoo number".

Commonsensemedia says the song "takes listeners through the squares and bayous of the city, bringing to life the mystery of voodoo and magic".

Slate wrote "[Facilier's] big number, Friends on the Other Side, is the best-written in the movie and a great showcase of spooky, voodoo-inflected animation; his comeuppance is appropriately spectacular."

High-Def Digest wrote "Pixar stalwart Randy Newman... adds warmth and a wonderful sense of genuine Americana to the proceedings... In particular Dr. Facilier's song, 'Friends on the Other Side', is a showstopper. It's a big, broad, scary song and it is an absolute hoot". The review said "I would include [it] in any 'Blu-ray highlight reel', because it just sounds so amazing. Sequences like that, which are so wholly immersive, with the dialogue so crystal clear and the surround atmospherics at peak precision, are the sequences that will sway anyone towards the glories of the high definition format."

Variety said the song was "sinister", and said it "recalls Scar's "Be Prepared" from The Lion King.

Filmtracks said the song "steals the show, Keith David's performance a standout". It also notes "The melodies of the songs do carry over throughout the score, of which more than half an hour exists on Disney's album for the soundtrack. The themes of "Almost There," "Friends on the Other Side," and "Ma Belle Evangeline" carry most of the load".

Yahoo.com described it as "devious" and one of the film's highlights, saying it is "delightfully trippy with its visuals".

FilmMusicMag wrote "if there's a devilish pleasure to The Princess and the Frog's songs, it's the Keith David-topped "Friends on the Other Side". This show-stealing, slick voodoo man ascends to classic Disney villainhood with "Friends on the Other Side", his soul-stealing enticement backed by a playfully sinister chorus, funeral brass and stop-and-start melodies that play the character like some twisted version of "Sportin' Life" in Porgy and Bess. It's a tune that's a devilishly fun match for Danny Elfman's "Oogie Boogie's Song" in The Nightmare Before Christmas, let alone when Alan Menken had Ursula belt out "Poor Unfortunate Souls" for The Little Mermaid".

== Certifications ==
Certifications for "Friends on the Other Side"
Region	Certification	Certified units/sales
United States (RIAA)	Gold	500,000^{‡}
^{‡} Sales+streaming figures based on certification alone.
