= Anika Noni Rose =

American actress (born 1972)

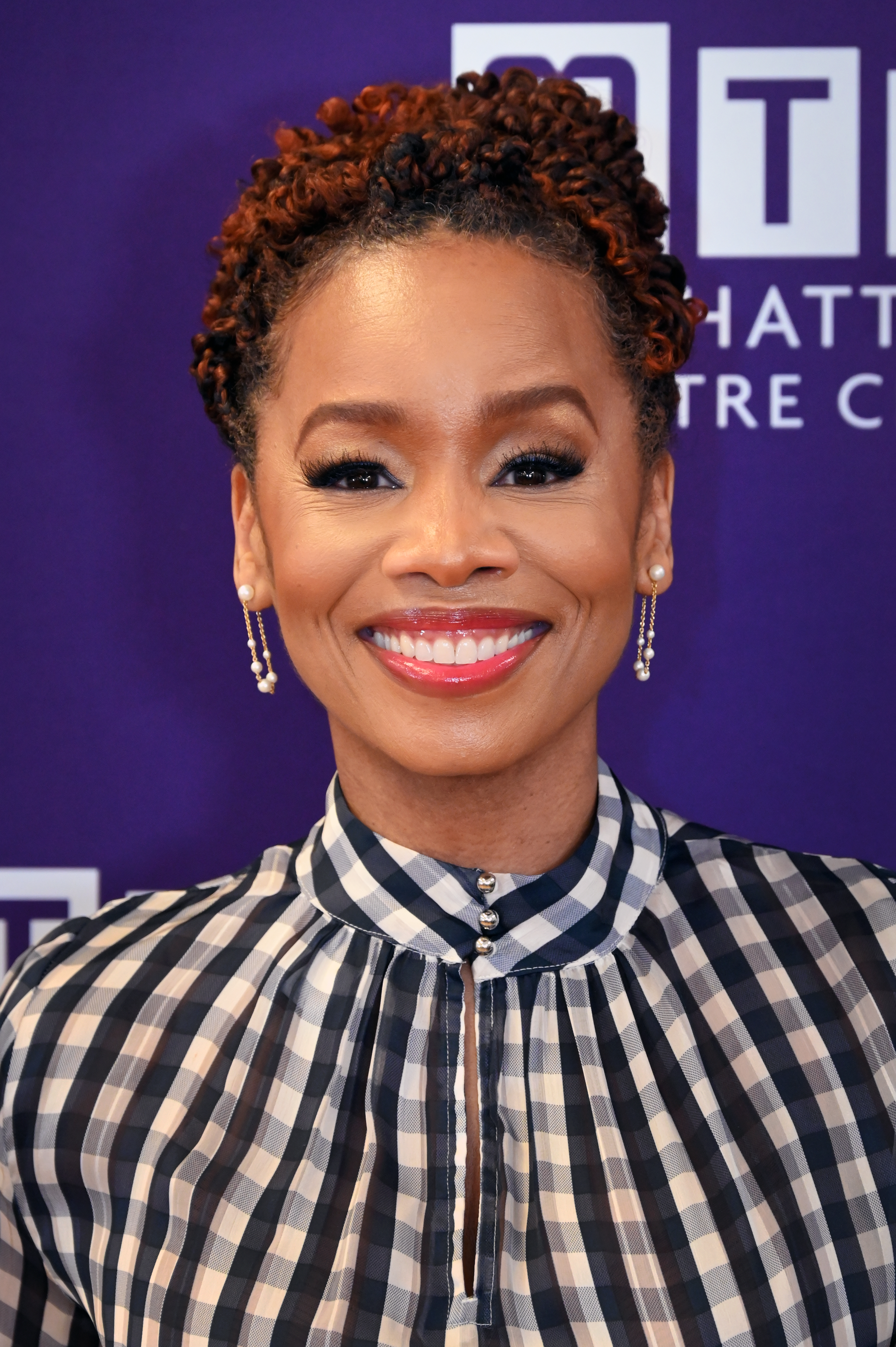
- Rose in 2026
- Born: September 6, 1972 (age 54); Bloomfield, Connecticut, U.S.
- Education: Florida A&M University (BA); American Conservatory Theater (MFA)
- Occupation: Actress
- Years active: 1998–present
- Spouse: Jason Dirden (m. 2022)

Anika Noni Rose (born September 6, 1972) is an American actress. She is best known for voicing Tiana in The Princess and the Frog (2009). She was named a Disney Legend in 2011.

Rose starred as Lorrell Robinson in the Academy Award-winning film Dreamgirls (2006). Her contribution to the film's soundtrack earned her a nomination for a Grammy Award. She is also known for her performances in theatre, particularly for starring as Emmie Thibodeaux in the Broadway production of Caroline, or Change (2004), for which she won the Tony Award for Best Featured Actress in a Musical, and Beneatha Younger in the Broadway revival of A Raisin in the Sun (2014), for which she was nominated for the Tony Award for Best Featured Actress in a Play.

== Early life and education ==
Rose was born in Bloomfield, Connecticut, to Claudia and John Rose, a corporate counsel. She attended Bloomfield High School, appearing in a school production during her freshman year. She earned a bachelor's degree in theatre from Florida A&M University, then studied drama at the American Conservatory Theater in San Francisco, California.

== Career ==
=== Early career ===
Rose moved to New York without a job. After three months, she played the role of Rusty in Broadway's Footloose. She followed Footloose with numerous workshops and two musicals using pre-existing song catalogs, Eli's Comin' Off-Broadway and Me and Mrs. Jones with Lou Rawls in Philadelphia. Both of the full-scale tuners (Note: "Tuner": theatre parlance introduced by Variety trade newspaper.) were rumored for transfers, but neither made it anywhere after their limited engagements ended. Rose's big Broadway break was getting cast as Emmie Thibodeaux in Caroline, or Change. In 2004, she was awarded the Theatre World Award, the Lucille Lortel Award for Outstanding Featured Actress, and the Tony Award for Best Featured Actress in a Musical for Caroline, or Change.

After her film debut, King of the Bingo Game, she played the role of Kaya in From Justin to Kelly in 2003 and performed in Temptation in 2004, followed by Surviving Christmas as a singer in the choir. In 2006, Rose starred in Dreamgirls as Lorrell Robinson with Beyoncé Knowles, Jennifer Hudson, Jamie Foxx, and Eddie Murphy. Rose appeared in the films Just Add Water and Razor.

Rose also starred alongside Jill Scott in The No. 1 Ladies Detective Agency directed by Anthony Minghella.

=== The Princess and the Frog ===
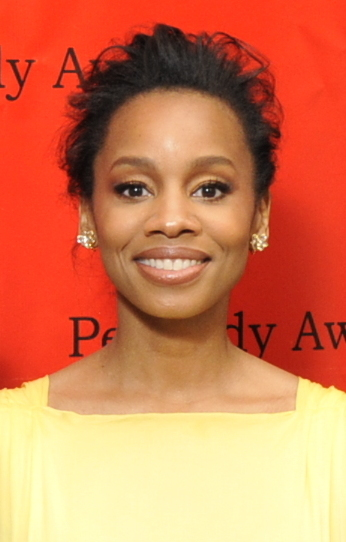
Anika Noni Rose at the 2009 Peabody Awards

Rose is best known for her role in Disney's 2009 animated feature The Princess and the Frog as the voice of the lead character Tiana. Rose was named a Disney Legend on August 19, 2011. Rose said, "I always dreamed of being a voice in a Disney movie, but even in those dreams, I never once dreamed of being a princess... I feel like what an honor that this is and how the dream comes true, bigger and stronger than I had even imagined it."

=== 2010s ===
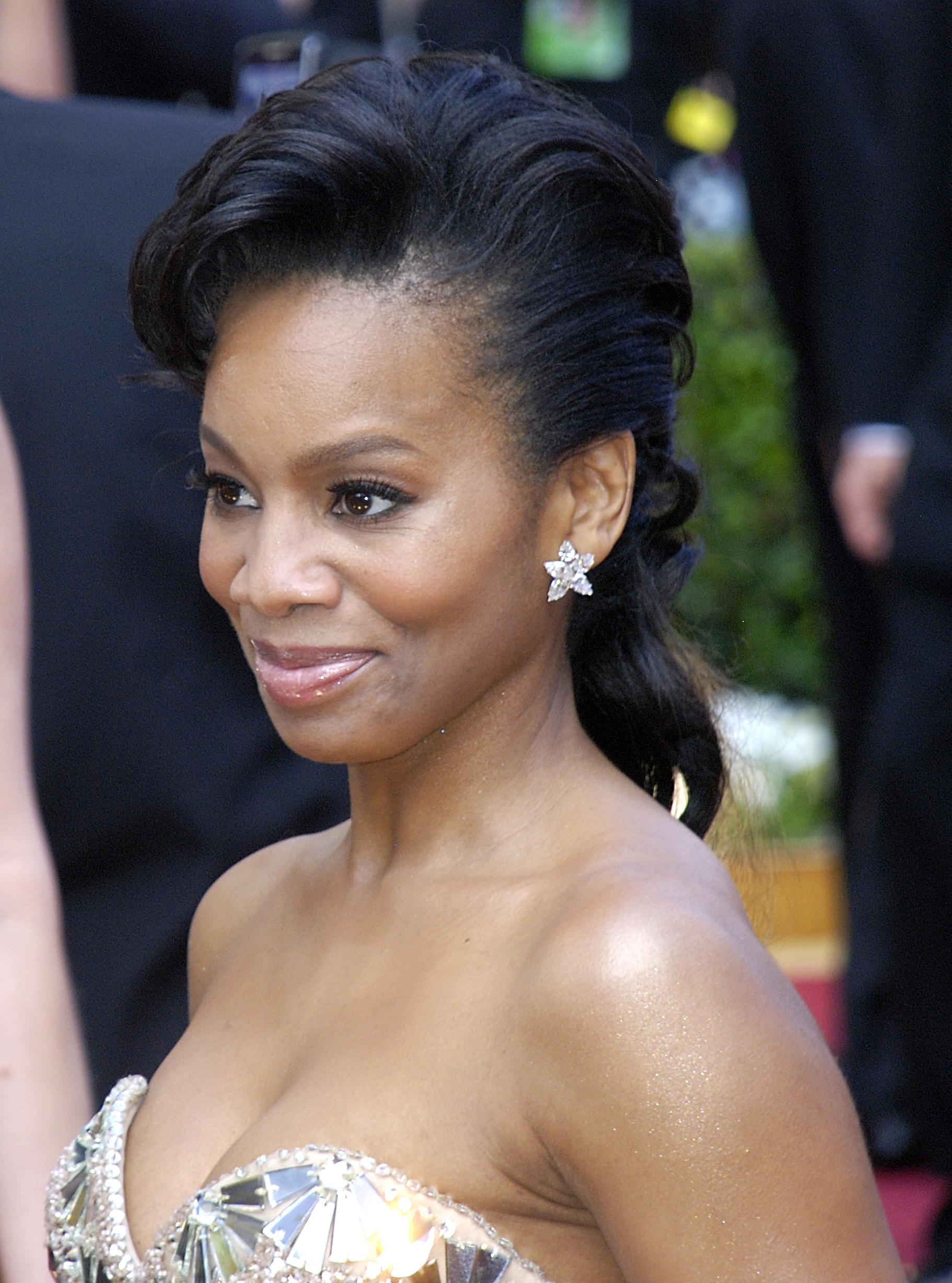
Rose at the 2010 Academy Awards

In 2010, Rose played the role of Yasmine in the film For Colored Girls directed by Tyler Perry and co-starring Phylicia Rashad and Janet Jackson. One critic described Rose's performance as "especially fierce". From 2010 to 2013, Rose had a guest-starring role in the legal TV drama The Good Wife. She played the role of Sara Tidwell in the A&E miniseries Bag of Bones in 2011, based on the Stephen King novel of the same name.

In 2012, Rose guest-starred in The Simpsons episode "Gone Abie Gone", voicing Abe Simpson's second wife, Rita LaFleur.

In 2014, Rose returned to Broadway in a revival of A Raisin in the Sun, receiving a nomination for the Tony Award for Best Featured Actress in a Play.

Rose played the adult Kizzy in two episodes of Roots, an adaptation of the novel by Alex Haley and a remake of the 1977 miniseries. Critic Alan Sepinwall, in suggesting Emmy nominees to the Academy of Television Arts & Sciences, called her "one of the best parts of the outstanding Roots ensemble". She had a role in the Starz series Power and the leading role in the 2017 BET drama The Quad. In 2019, a star was named after Rose through the International Star Registry.

=== 2020s ===
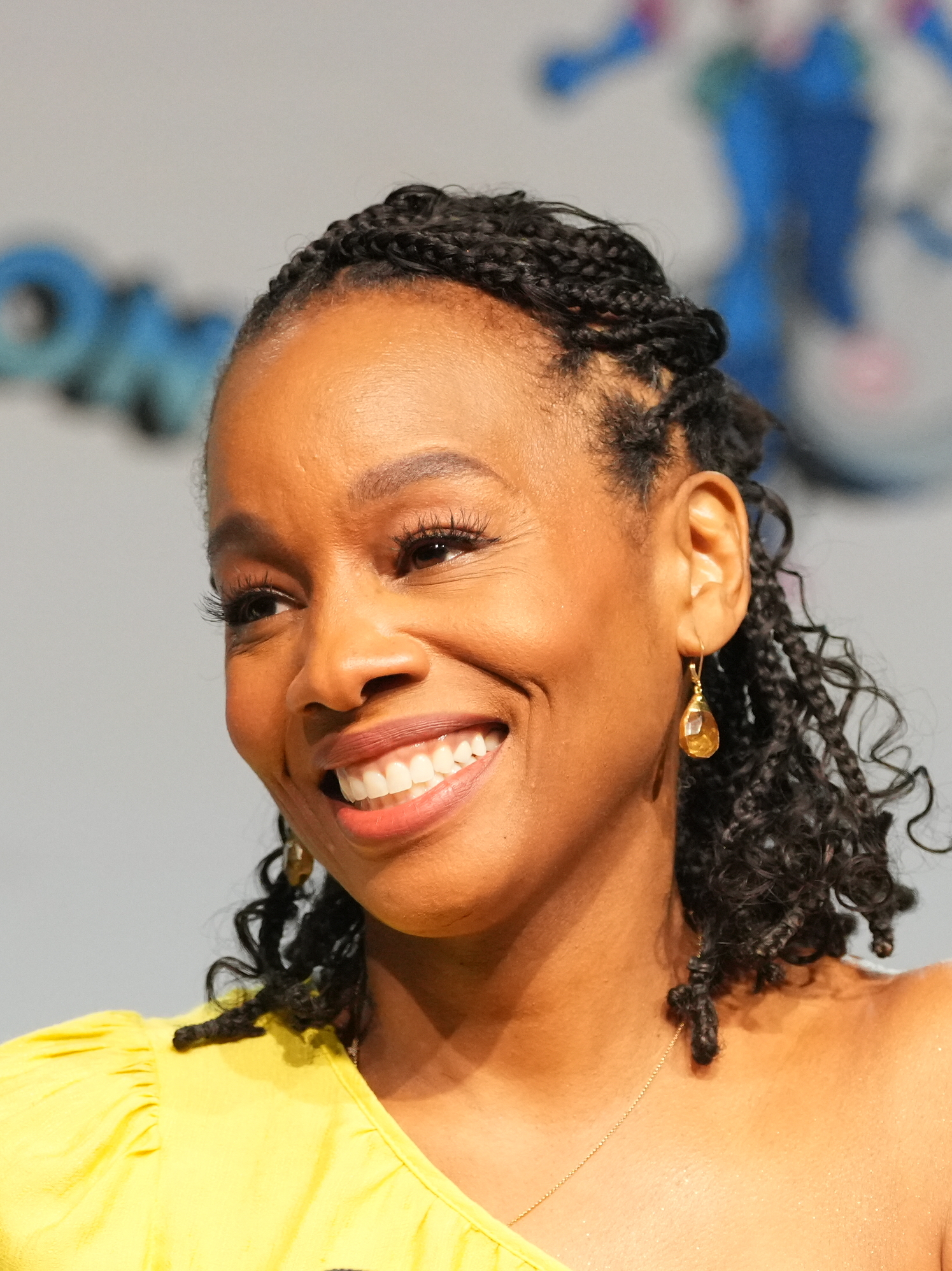
Rose at the 2024 Ft. Lauderdale's Super Festival

During the COVID-19 pandemic lockdown of 2020, Rose created a weekly series, Bedtime Stories for the Littles, where she read bedtime stories to small children to help ease their fear during the lockdown. Rose said, "I love reading to kids, and I wanted to give our little people something soft and soothing in this very jarring moment in time. I thought a bedtime story would be the perfect way. I can give my voice to the ones who know it best, without anyone leaving home." She also said that she wanted to help children act silly, use their imaginations, and find a love of books that Rose said she had as a child. As one of the stories in the series, Rose chose the Princess and the Frog book "Tiana's Growing Experiment."

In 2020, Rose starred in the Netflix musical Jingle Jangle: A Christmas Journey playing Jessica Jangle. Rose applauded the film's portrayal of black and brown professionals in an English Victorian setting. In 2021, she played in the Netflix limited series Maid and in the Amazon horror-series Them. Between 2022 and 2023, she acted as Naomi Cole on Showtime series Let the Right One In and returned to voice the character of Tiana in Disney special film Once Upon a Studio and series Lego Disney Princess: The Castle Quest.

In 2024, she returned to acting in the theater after four years, playing the role of Elena in the Lincoln Center Theatre revival of the Anton Chekov play Uncle Vanya at the Vivian Beaumont Theatre. The same year Rose worked as a voice actress in season two of SuperKitties, where she voiced Cat Burglar's country cousin Sassy, and in Barry Jenkins' film Mufasa: The Lion King as Afia, being nominated at the 56th NAACP Image Awards for her performance. In 2025, she had a voice cameo as the “Squeal of Fortune” in the Disney animated film Zootopia 2.

==== Tiana's Bayou Adventure ====
In June 2020, Disney announced that they would be reworking the ride Splash Mountain in their U.S. theme parks with characters from The Princess and the Frog due to controversy regarding its base film, Song of the South. Rose said: "It's thrilling. People are amped and ready. I think it's awesome, particularly now, to be reinvigorating her story." Disney stated that the ride would take place after the events of the film, during Carnival season. Rose also added that she would love for Disney to create a Tiana's Palace Restaurant at the theme parks. "I've been looking forward to a Tiana's Palace for years ... I have dreams of them partnering with [New Orleans'] Café du Monde on some real deal beignets, having some fantastic shrimp and grits and king cake during Mardi Gras season. And the occasional second line through the joint. Basically all the things I love!" In June 2022, Rose mentioned that she was involved with discussions with Disney on what they wanted the ride to be like. In July 2022, Disney announced that the ride would be called Tiana's Bayou Adventure, setting and opening date of "late 2024" at Disneyland and Magic Kingdom. In September 2022, it was confirmed that Rose would reprise her role as Tiana for the ride. In January 2023, it was announced that Disneyland would convert its French Market Restaurant in the New Orleans Square section of the park into a Tiana's Palace restaurant. Tiana's Palace opened in September 2023. Tianas Bayou Adventure opened at Magic Kingdom in June 2024, and at Disneyland in November 2024.

== Personal life ==
Rose married actor Jason Dirden on 16 October 2022. The wedding, which was officiated by Colman Domingo, took place at the Paramour Estate in Los Angeles. The couple kept their nuptials a secret before announcing they were married in Brides magazine on January 16, 2023.

== Acting credits ==
=== Film ===
Year	Title	Role	Notes
1999	King of the Bingo Game	Film Noir Female	Short film
2003	From Justin to Kelly	Kaya	
2004	Temptation	Fog	
2004	Surviving Christmas	Choir	
2006	Dreamgirls	Lorrell Maya Robinson	
2008	Just Add Water	R'ch'lle	
2009	The Princess and the Frog	Tiana (voice)	
2010	For Colored Girls	Yasmine	
2011	Company	Marta	
2012	Skyler	Therapist	
2013	As Cool as I Am	Frances	
2013	Khumba	Lungisa (voice)	
2013	Half of a Yellow Sun	Kainene	
2014	Imperial Dreams	Miss Price	
2014	A Day Late and a Dollar Short	Paris	
2016	Throne of Elves	Meyla (voice)	
2016	Grace for President	Narrator	Video short
2017	Vixen	Kuasa (voice)	Video
2017	Everything, Everything	Dr. Pauline Whittier	
2018	Assassination Nation	Nance	
2018	Ralph Breaks the Internet	Tiana (voice)	
2020	Body Cam	Taneesha Branz	
2020	Jingle Jangle: A Christmas Journey	Jessica Jangle	
2021	The Killing of Kenneth Chamberlain	Candace Wade	
2021	Injustice	Selina Kyle / Catwoman (voice)	
2023	Once Upon a Studio	Tiana (voice)	Short film
2023	Outlaw Johnny Black	Jessie Lee	
2024	Mufasa: The Lion King	Afia (voice)	
2025	Zootopia 2	Squeal of Fortune Mouse (voice)	Cameo

=== Television ===
Year	Title	Role	Notes
2001	100 Centre Street	Woman	Episode: "Domestic Abuses"
2002	Third Watch	Monay	Episode: "Thicker Than Water"
2003	Hack		Episode: "Hidden Agenda"
2007	The Starter Wife	Lavender	Main cast
2008–09	The No. 1 Ladies' Detective Agency	Grace Makutsi	Main cast
2010–13	The Good Wife	Wendy Scott-Carr	Recurring role (season 2–3), guest (season 4)
2011	LA Phil Live	Juliet	Episode: "Dudamel Conducts Tchaikovsky"
2011	Law & Order: Special Victims Unit	Miriam Deng	Episode: "Scorched Earth"
2011	Have a Little Faith	Annette	TV film
2011	Bag of Bones	Sara Tidwell	Episode: "Part 1 & 2"
2012	Private Practice	Corinne Bennett	Recurring role (season 5)
2012	Elementary	Dr. Carrie Dwyer	Episode: "Lesser Evils"
2012	The Simpsons	Rita LaFleur (voice)	Episode: "Gone Abie Gone"
2013	The Watsons Go to Birmingham	Wilona Sands Watson	TV film
2014	A Day Late and a Dollar Short	Paris Price	TV film
2014	Sofia the First	Princess Tiana (voice)	Episode: "Winter's Gift"
2015	For Justice	Natalia Chapin	TV film
2015–16	Bates Motel	Liz Babbitt	Recurring role (season 3–4)
2015–16	Vixen	Kuasa (voice)	Main role
2016	Roots	Kizzy Waller	Episode: "Part 3 & 4"
2016–17	Power	LaVerne "Jukebox" Ganner	Recurring role (season 3–4)
2017	Voltron: Legendary Defender	Acxa (voice)	2 episodes; role recast with Erica Luttrell
2017–18	The Quad	Dr. Eva Fletcher	Main cast
2018	American Masters	Lorraine Hansberry (voice)	Episode: "Lorraine Hansberry: Sighted Eyes/Feeling Heart"
2018–19	Disney Comics in Motion	Tiana (voice)	2 episodes
2019	Avengers Assemble	Yemandi (voice)	Episode: "Yemandi"
2019	Beast Mode	Marsha Blackstone	TV film
2020	Magical Girl Friendship Squad: Origins	Nut (voice)	Main cast
2020	Little Fires Everywhere	Pauline Hawthorne	2 episodes
2021	Family Reunion	Miss Karen	Episode: "Remember Mazzi's First Love?"
2021	Them	Ella Mae Johnson	Recurring role
2021	Maid	Regina	Main role
2021–22	Amphibia	Dr. Jan (voice)	Recurring role (season 3)
2022	Let the Right One In	Naomi Cole	Main role
2022	Pantheon	Various roles	Voice; 4 episodes
2023	Lego Disney Princess: The Castle Quest	Princess Tiana (voice)	TV special
2023	Star Wars: Visions	Eureka, Livy's Mother (voice)	Episode: "The Pit"
2024	SuperKitties	Cousin Sassy (voice)	2 episodes
2025	Eyes of Wakanda	Black Panther (voice)	Episode: "The Last Panther"
2025	Lego Disney Princess: Villains Unite	Princess Tiana (voice)	TV special
2025	The Mighty Nein	Marion Lavorre (voice)	

=== Theatre ===
Year	Title	Role	Venue	Notes
1998	Insurrection: Holding History	Katie Lynn	American Conservatory Theater	San Francisco
1998	Valley Song	Veronica Jonkers	Berkeley Repertory Theater	Berkeley
1998	Hydriotaphia, or the Death of Dr. Browne	His Soul	Berkeley Repertory Theater	Berkeley
1999	Tartuffe	Marianne	American Conservatory Theater	San Francisco
1999	Threepenny Opera	Polly Peachum	American Conservatory Theater	San Francisco
2000	Footloose	Rusty	Richard Rodgers Theatre	Broadway debut; replacement
2001	Carmen Jones	Cindy Lou	York Theatre	Off-Broadway
2001	Eli's Comin'	The Woman	Vineyard Theatre	Off-Broadway
2001	Me and Mrs. Jones	Cookie	Prince Music Theater	Philadelphia
2003	Caroline, or Change	Emmie Thibodeaux	The Public Theater	Off-Broadway
2004	Caroline, or Change	Emmie Thibodeaux	Eugene O'Neill Theatre	Broadway
2004	Caroline, or Change	Emmie Thibodeaux	Ahmanson Theatre	Los Angeles
2008	Cat on a Hot Tin Roof	Maggie "The Cat"	Broadhurst Theatre	Broadway
2011	Company	Marta	David Geffen Hall	New York Philharmonic concert
2013	Hamilton	Angelica Schuyler	Vassar College	Workshop
2014	A Raisin in the Sun	Beneatha Younger	Ethel Barrymore Theatre	Broadway
2018	Carmen Jones	Carmen Jones	Classic Stage Company	Off-Broadway
2024	Uncle Vanya	Elena	Vivian Beaumont Theatre	Broadway
2025	Wonderful Town	Ruth Sherwood	New York City Center	Off-Broadway

=== Video games ===
Year	Title	Voice role
2011	Kinect: Disneyland Adventures	Princess Tiana
2012	Disney Princess: My Fairytale Adventure	Princess Tiana
2024	Disney Dreamlight Valley	Princess Tiana
2026	Disney Speedstorm	Princess Tiana

== Awards and nominations ==
Year	Award	Category	Nominated work	Result	Ref.
2001	Obie Award	Best Performance	Eli's Comin'	Won	
2004	Clarence Derwent Award	Best Supporting Female	Caroline, or Change	Won	
2004	Lucille Lortel Award	Outstanding Featured Actress	Caroline, or Change	Won	
2004	Theatre World Award	Theatre World Award	Caroline, or Change	Won	
2004	Tony Award	Best Featured Actress in a Musical	Caroline, or Change	Won	
2004	Drama Desk Award	Outstanding Featured Actress in a Musical	Caroline, or Change	Nominated	
2007	NAACP Image Award	Outstanding Supporting Actress in a Motion Picture	Dreamgirls	Nominated	
2007	Screen Actors Guild Award	Outstanding Cast in a Motion Picture	Dreamgirls	Nominated	
2008	NAACP Image Award	Outstanding Actress in a Miniseries or Movie	The Starter Wife	Nominated	
2008	Grammy Award	Best Compilation Soundtrack for Visual Media	Dreamgirls	Nominated	
2009	Satellite Award	Best Supporting Actress – Series, Miniseries or Television Film	The No. 1 Ladies' Detective Agency	Nominated	
2010	NAACP Image Award	Outstanding Supporting Actress in a Drama Series	The No. 1 Ladies' Detective Agency	Nominated	
2010	NAACP Image Award	Outstanding Actress in a Motion Picture	The Princess and the Frog	Nominated	
2010	Black Reel Award	Outstanding Voice Performance	The Princess and the Frog	Won	
2010	Black Reel Award	Outstanding Original Song	"Down in New Orleans" from The Princess and the Frog	Nominated	
2010	Black Reel Award	Outstanding Original Song	"Almost There" from The Princess and the Frog	Won	
2011	Black Reel Award	Outstanding Ensemble	For Colored Girls	Won	
2011	Black Reel Award	Outstanding Supporting Actress	For Colored Girls	Nominated	
2011	NAACP Image Award	Outstanding Supporting Actress in a Motion Picture	For Colored Girls	Nominated	
2011	Disney Legend Award	Animation – Voice	The Princess and the Frog	Won	
2012	NAACP Image Award	Outstanding Supporting Actress in a Drama Series	Law & Order: Special Victims Unit	Nominated	
2014	Tony Award	Best Featured Actress in a Play	A Raisin in the Sun	Nominated	
2019	Lucille Lortel Award	Outstanding Lead Actress in a Musical	Carmen Jones	Won	
2019	Outer Critics Circle Award	Outstanding Actress in a Musical	Carmen Jones	Nominated	
2019	Drama Desk Award	Outstanding Actress in a Musical	Carmen Jones	Nominated	
2025	NAACP Image Awards	Outstanding Character Voice Performance – Motion Picture	Mufasa: The Lion King	Nominated	
