= The Princess and the Frog (soundtrack) =

The Princess and the Frog (Original Motion Picture Soundtrack)

Soundtrack album by Various Artists
- Released: November 23, 2009
- Recorded: 2008–2009
- Studios: Sony Scoring Stage, Culver City
- Genres: Jazz, blues, soul, gospel, R&B, zydeco
- Label: Walt Disney
- Producer: Randy Newman

Randy Newman chronology
Leatherheads (Original Motion Picture Soundtrack) (2008)	The Princess and the Frog (Original Motion Picture Soundtrack) (2009)	Toy Story 3 (Original Motion Picture Soundtrack) (2010)

Singles from The Princess and the Frog (Original Motion Picture Soundtrack)
- 1. "Never Knew I Needed" Released: October 27, 2009

The Princess and the Frog (Original Motion Picture Soundtrack) is the soundtrack of Disney Animation's 2009 film The Princess and the Frog. It was released by Walt Disney Records on November 23, 2009, just a day before the limited release of the film in New York City and Los Angeles. It contains ten original songs and seven score pieces, all but one of which were composed, arranged and conducted by composer Randy Newman, who previously worked with the film's executive producer John Lasseter on Pixar's films Toy Story, A Bug's Life, Toy Story 2, Monsters, Inc. and Cars. "Never Knew I Needed" was written and performed by Ne-Yo. The song had an accompanying music video which featured rotation on Disney Channel. The song was also sent to rhythmic radio on October 27, 2009. The songs are performed by various artists most of which lend their voices to characters in the film. The score features African-American-influenced styles including jazz, zydeco, blues and gospel.

"Almost There" and "Down in New Orleans" were both nominated in the Best Original Song category at the 82nd Academy Awards; they lost to "The Weary Kind". "Down in New Orleans" was also nominated for the Grammy Award for Best Song Written for a Motion Picture, Television or Other Visual Media at the 53rd Grammy Awards.

== Track listing ==
All tracks are written by Randy Newman, except track 1 which is written by Ne-Yo.

The Princess and the Frog (Original Motion Picture Soundtrack)
No.	Title	Performer	Length
1.	"Never Knew I Needed"	Ne-Yo	3:38
2.	"Down in New Orleans (Prologue)"	Anika Noni Rose	0:28
3.	"Down in New Orleans"	Dr. John	2:27
4.	"Almost There"	Anika Noni Rose	2:24
5.	"Friends on the Other Side"	Keith David	3:35
6.	"When We're Human"	Michael-Leon Wooley, Bruno Campos and Anika Noni Rose featuring Terence Blanchard	2:22
7.	"Gonna Take You There"	Jim Cummings featuring Terrance Simien on Accordion	1:46
8.	"Ma Belle Evangeline"	Jim Cummings featuring Terence Blanchard	1:56
9.	"Dig a Little Deeper"	Jenifer Lewis featuring the Pinnacle Gospel Choir and Anika Noni Rose	2:48
10.	"Down in New Orleans (Finale)"	Anika Noni Rose	1:38
11.	"Fairy Tale/Going Home" (score)	Randy Newman	4:17
12.	"I Know This Story" (score)	Randy Newman	5:27
13.	"The Frog Hunters/Gator Down" (score)	Randy Newman	6:04
14.	"Tiana's Bad Dream" (score)	Randy Newman	6:22
15.	"Ray Laid Low" (score; with a reprise of "Almost There")	Randy Newman; cameo appearance by Anika Noni Rose	3:22
16.	"Ray/Mama Odie" (score)	Randy Newman	4:01
17.	"This Is Gonna Be Good" (score)	Randy Newman	3:20

== Reception ==
Professional ratings
Review scores
Source	Rating
AllMusic	3.5/5 stars
Filmtracks	4/5 stars

Matthew Wilkinson of Screen Rant stated that Princess and the Frog is among Disney's finest princess films and found its soundtrack to be outstanding. Wilkinson considered the film’s portrayal of New Orleans culture through its vibrant jazz music, varied songs, and depiction of Mardi Gras to be particularly effective. Grace Magee of Comic Book Resources described The Princess and the Frog as an underrated Disney film, emphasizing that while its visuals can be unsettling, the music is a highlight. Magee noted that the soundtrack includes a significant villain song, "Friends on the Other Side," which serves as a pivotal moment in the film, and praised "Almost There" for its truly beautiful vocals.

Matt Watkins of MovieWeb said that Newman's soundtrack is filled with jazzy musical numbers and skillfully integrates various genres to capture the vibrant cultural backdrop of New Orleans. Watkins particularly praised the lively and empowering "Almost There" performed by Anika Noni Rose. Alexis Petridis of The Guardian asserted that Newman's soundtrack for features a series of excellent pastiches of New Orleans music, including R&B and zydeco, and found its greatest moment to be a tribute to voodoo.

== Charts ==
Chart performance for The Princess and the Frog (Original Motion Picture Soundtrack)
Chart (2009)	Peak position
UK Compilation Albums (OCC)	63
UK Soundtrack Albums (OCC)	12
US Billboard 200	80
US Kid Albums (Billboard)	10
US Top Soundtracks (Billboard)	7

Chart performance for The Princess and the Frog (Original Motion Picture Soundtrack)
Chart (2023)	Peak position
UK Soundtrack Albums (OCC)	28
