= Tiana's Palace =

Restaurant at Disneyland in Anaheim, California

Coordinates: 33.8112°N 117.9215°W

Tiana's Palace is a restaurant in New Orleans Square located at Disneyland in Anaheim, California. It is based on Disney Animation's 2009 film The Princess and the Frog. It originally opened as the French Market Restaurant in 1966, which it remained as until it was rethemed in 2023.
