= Down in New Orleans (song) =

Song by Dr. John

from the album The Princess and the Frog: Original Songs and Score
- Released: 2009
- Recorded: 2008
- Genre: New Orleans R&B
- Length: 2:25
- Label: Walt Disney Records
- Songwriter: Randy Newman

"Down in New Orleans" is a song from Disney Animation's 2009 film The Princess and the Frog, written by Randy Newman. Several versions of the song were recorded for use in different parts of the film and other materials.

The song was nominated for Best Original Song at the 82nd Academy Awards, but lost to "The Weary Kind" from Crazy Heart. The full version of the song appears at the title sequence in the film, performed by Dr. John. The song introduces the city of New Orleans and foreshadows the manipulations of Dr. Facilier, the film's main villain. This is the first full song in the movie and the only one during the film not sung by one of the characters (Ne-Yo's "Never Knew I Needed" appears only over the closing credits).

Tiana sings both a prologue to the song at the opening of the film, and a shorter version of the song as a finale at its end. Anika Noni Rose, the voice of Tiana, also performed the song in full for The Princess and the Frog: Tiana and her Princess Friends along with songs by other Disney Princesses, including "Happy Working Song", another Academy Award-nominated song. A year before the film came out in theatres, Randy Newman himself performed the song at the 2008 New Orleans Jazz & Heritage Festival.

The song was nominated for Best Song at the 53rd Grammy Awards; in this category and the Academy Award it lost to "The Weary Kind". "Almost There", another song from the film, performed by Tiana (Anika Noni Rose), was also nominated for the Oscar.
