= Never Knew I Needed =

Single by Ne-Yo

from the album The Princess and the Frog: Original Songs and Score
- Released: October 27, 2009
- Recorded: 2008
- Genre: Neo soul
- Length: 3:38
- Label: Walt Disney; Def Jam
- Songwriter: Shaffer Smith
- Producer: Chuck Harmony

Ne-Yo singles chronology
"Baby by Me" (2009)	"Never Knew I Needed" (2009)	"Angels Cry" (2009)

Music video
- "Never Knew I Needed" on YouTube

"Never Knew I Needed" is a song written and performed by American R&B singer Ne-Yo for the 2009 Walt Disney Animation Studios film The Princess and the Frog. Produced by Ne-Yo's frequent collaborator Chuck Harmony, it is heard during the end credits of the film and is also the first single from the film's original soundtrack. The song, released and sent to rhythmic radio in the U.S. by Walt Disney Records and Def Jam Recordings on October 27, 2009, and released as a digital download on November 3, 2009, had an accompanying music video which was in heavy rotation on the Disney Channel. The song reached number 56 on the Billboard Hot R&B/Hip-Hop Songs chart. The song also has an official remix that features Cassandra Steen. The song is an R&B ballad that features a drum machine, a piano and a synthesizer in the chorus.

== Music video ==
The music video was directed by Melina Matsoukas. It was released on October 29, 2009.

The video pays homage to several scenes in The Princess and the Frog. It takes place in New Orleans in possibly the jazz age—the time period the film is set. It starts with Ne-Yo walking through the empty streets fantasizing about a woman as jazz musicians play behind him. He walks into a restaurant where he works as a waiter the woman / "Princess" character is a beautiful and clearly wealthy customer who is dining with her family. Ne-Yo then goes into an empty warehouse which he imagines is a kitchen (homage to the scene in which Almost There is performed). He dreams the woman has come to visit him and they are eating some of Ne-Yo's cooking and having a good time with each other. Ne-Yo then takes a streetcar and he sees the woman with her family outside the home through the window. The woman looks up and sees him on the streetcar and runs after it. This is intercut with Ne-Yo overlooking the bayou where a large portion of the Princess and the Frog takes place. He turns around and the woman is standing behind him the two run to each other and share a kiss while two frogs on the bayou are also seen kissing.

== Charts ==
Chart (2009–2010)	Peak position
German Singles Chart	64
Japan Hot 100	13
UK Singles Chart	99
US Billboard Hot R&B/Hip-Hop Songs	56

== Certifications ==
Certifications for "Never Knew I Needed"
Region	Certification	Certified units/sales
United States (RIAA)	Gold	500,000^{‡}
^{‡} Sales+streaming figures based on certification alone.
