= Toy Story 3 (soundtrack) =

2010 soundtrack album by Randy Newman

Toy Story 3 (Original Motion Picture Soundtrack)

Soundtrack album by Randy Newman
- Released: June 15, 2010
- Recorded: 2009–2010
- Genre: Film score
- Length: 56:18
- Label: Walt Disney
- Producer: Randy Newman

Randy Newman chronology
| The Princess and the Frog (2009) | Toy Story 3 (2010) | Monsters University (2013) |

Singles from Toy Story 3 (Original Motion Picture Soundtrack)
- 1. "We Belong Together" Released: June 14, 2010

Professional ratings
Review scores
| Source | Rating |
|---|---|
| Empire | 4/5 stars |
| Filmtracks | 3/5 stars |
| Movie Music UK | 3.5/5 stars |
| Movie Wave | 4/5 stars |

Toy Story 3 (Original Motion Picture Soundtrack) is the soundtrack album to Disney/Pixar's 2010 film of the same name composed by Randy Newman. The score was composed and conducted by Pixar's recurrent collaborator, Randy Newman, who also scored for the previous installments in the franchise. The score album, featuring an original song "We Belong Together" performed by Newman, and instrumental tracks were released on June 15, 2010 by Walt Disney Records. It was also the sixth Pixar film not to be scored by Michael Giacchino or Thomas Newman. The track "You've Got a Friend in Me" from the first installment is also featured in the album, performed by The Gipsy Kings.

The album was initially released through digital download in lossy formats such as MP3 and AAC, and was not released in CD; the second time, where a Pixar film soundtrack was not released through physical formats, the first being Up. In January 2012, Intrada released the album on CD. The score received positive critical reception, and had won the Grammy Award for Best Score Soundtrack for Visual Media, while "We Belong Together" won the Academy Award for Best Original Song.

== Development ==
The track "We Belong Together" was initially planned as a duet song, featuring popular singers Lady Gaga or Katy Perry, and John Mayer performing the track. But Pixar decided against doing so, and instead wanted him to sing the track as "to retain that consistency" as he voiced for the songs in the first two instalments.

In a 2015 interview, Newman recalled that he was unhappy with the director Lee Unkrich, on using the temporary version of the score. He said that, "The movie did great and everything, and maybe I'm wrong and if I look back on it I won't know the difference – but it didn't fit hand in glove the way I would have tried to do – and he fell in love with the [temporary score] very much". He further rejected the offer for composing, Unkrich's Coco (2017), which later went to Michael Giacchino.

== Track listing ==
All tracks are written by Randy Newman, except where noted.

| No. | Title | Writer(s) | Performer(s) | Length |
|---|---|---|---|---|
| 1. | "We Belong Together" | | Randy Newman | 4:03 |
| 2. | "You've Got a Friend in Me" (para Buzz Español) | | The Gipsy Kings | 2:15 |
| 3. | "Cowboy!" | Newman; Jonathan Sacks | | 4:10 |
| 4. | "Garbage?" | | | 2:40 |
| 5. | "Sunnyside" | | | 2:20 |
| 6. | "Woody Bails" | Newman; Sacks | | 4:40 |
| 7. | "Come to Papa" | | | 2:05 |
| 8. | "Go See Lotso" | | | 3:36 |
| 9. | "Bad Buzz" | | | 2:22 |
| 10. | "You Got Lucky" | | | 5:58 |
| 11. | "Spanish Buzz" | Newman; Don Davis; Bruno Coon | | 3:31 |
| 12. | "What About Daisy?" | Newman; Davis | | 2:07 |
| 13. | "To the Dump" | Newman; Davis | | 3:50 |
| 14. | "The Claw" | Newman; Davis; Sacks | | 3:56 |
| 15. | "Going Home" | | | 3:22 |
| 16. | "So Long" | | | 4:55 |
| 17. | "Zu-Zu" (Ken's Theme) | Newman; Coon | | 0:35 |
| Total length: | | | | 56:18 |

== Additional music ==
In addition to the tracks included in the soundtrack album, the film also uses several other tracks such as "Dream Weaver" by Gary Wright, "Le Freak" by Chic, and Randy Newman's original version of "You've Got a Friend in Me". Furthermore, tracks "Cowboy!" and "Come to Papa" included material from Newman's rejected score to Air Force One. The song "Losing You" from Newman's own album Harps and Angels was also used in the first trailer for the film. The Judas Priest song "Electric Eye" was also used in the film in the temp score for the opening scene of Toy Story 3.

== Toy Story Favorites ==
In 2010, Walt Disney Records released a special soundtrack titled Toy Story Favorites, that included songs from the previous Toy Story soundtracks. The tracks "We Belong Together" and Gipsy Kings' version of "You've Got a Friend in Me" were featured in the album.

== Chart positions ==
| Chart (2010) | Peak position |
|---|---|
| Mexican Albums (Top 100 Mexico) | 8 |
| UK Soundtrack Albums (OCC) | 23 |
| US Billboard 200 | 145 |
| US Soundtrack Albums (Billboard) | 34 |

== Accolades ==
| Award | Category | Recipients | Result |
|---|---|---|---|
| 2011 Grammy Awards | Best Score Soundtrack Album for a Motion Picture, Television or Other Visual Media | Toy Story 3 (Original Motion Picture Soundtrack) | Won |
| 16th Annual BFCA Critics Choice Awards | Broadcast Film Critics Association Award for Best Sound | Randy Newman | Nominated |
| 16th Annual BFCA Critics Choice Awards | Best Original Song | Randy Newman (for "We Belong Together") | Nominated |
| 83rd Academy Awards | Best Original Song | Randy Newman (for "We Belong Together") | Won |
