= Almost There (The Princess and the Frog song) =

Song by Anika Noni Rose

from the album The Princess and the Frog: Original Songs and Score
- Released: November 23, 2009
- Genre: Dixieland jazz; soul
- Length: 2:24
- Label: Walt Disney
- Songwriter: Randy Newman
- Producer: Randy Newman

"Almost There" is a song written by Randy Newman for Disney Animation's 2009 film The Princess and the Frog. It was originally recorded by actress and singer Anika Noni Rose in her film role as Tiana.

The song was nominated for Best Original Song at the 82nd Academy Awards, but lost to "The Weary Kind" from Crazy Heart. "Down in New Orleans", another song from the film, performed by Dr. John (with prologue & finale versions by Rose), was also nominated for the Oscar.

== Synopsis ==
Tiana and her mother Eudora, are at Tiana's restaurant. In the song, Tiana is singing that she is "Almost There" to successfully opening her dream restaurant. During the song sequence, the animation shifts to the same art deco style used in Tiana's picture of her dream restaurant that her father James gave her.

== Other languages ==
Besides the original English version, Disney Character Voices International released The Princess and the Frog (including the song) dubbed in 41 foreign-language versions of "Almost There".

"Almost There" in other languages
Performer(s)	Title	Translation	Language
Jacqeline Rafiq	قربت خلاص (Qrbt khlas)	"I've Come Close to Deliverance"	Arabic
Kacau Gomes	"Quase Lá"	"Almost There"	Brazilian Portuguese
Ralitsa Guberska	"Почти успях" (Pochti uspyakh)	"I am Almost There"	Bulgarian
官恩娜 (Ella Koon)	"自信可得到" (Ji sun hoh dak do)	"Self-confidence can be obtained"	Cantonese
Chila Lynn	"Ya Llegaré"	"Already arrived"	Castilian Spanish
Vanda Winter	"Samo malo još"	"Just a little more"	Croatian
Dagmar Sobková	"Málem tam"	"Almost There"	Czech
Nellie Ettison	"Taet, tæt på"	"Close, close to"	Danish
Linda Wagenmakers	"Zo dichtbij"	"So close"	Dutch
Sandra Uusberg	"Hästi läheb"	"Doing Well"	Estonian
Laura Voutilainen	"Voin Saavuttaa"	"I can Achieve"	Finnish
Sandrine Van Handenhoven	"Zo dichtbij"	"So close"	Flemish
China Moses	"Au Bout Du Rêve"	"After my dream"	French
Cassandra Steen	"Ganz nah dran"	"Very close to it"	German
Shaya	"Μια Στιγμή" (Mia Stigmí̱)	"A moment"	Greek
Ninet	"אני שם כמעט" (Ani Sham Kim'at)	"I'm There Almost"	Hebrew
Marianne D'Cruz Aiman	"नहीं मंजिल दूर" (Nahin Manzil Door)	"The Destination's Not Far"	Hindi
Vágó Bernadett	"Álmom Vár!"	"Almost There"	Hungarian
Selma Björnsdóttir	"Ég Er Rétt Að Ná"	"I just reach"	Icelandic
Tisa Julianti	"Hampir Kesana"	"Almost there"	Indonesian
Karima Amma	"Ce la farò"	"I'll do it"	Italian
Suzuki Honoka	"夢まで あとすこし" (Yume made ato sukoshi)	"A little step away from a dream"	Japanese
Lee Young-Mi	"거의 다 왔어" (Geoui da wass-eo)	"We're almost there"	Korean
Paula Arias Esquivel	"Ya Llegaré"	"Already arrived"	Latin American Spanish
Ieva Kerēviča	"Viss būs"	"Everything will be"	Latvian
Jurga Šeduikytė-Bareikienė	"Jau beveik"	"It's almost there"	Lithuanian
Unknown singer	"Makin Dekat"	"Nearer and nearer"	Malaysian
Xiao Man-Xuan	"要實現" (Yào shíxiàn)	"Will achieve"	Mandarin (Taiwan)
Noora Noor	"Nesten Der"	"Almost There"	Norwegian
Karolina Trębacz	"Prawie Udało Się"	"Almost There"	Polish
Nayma Mingas	"Quase Lá"	"Almost There"	Portuguese
Nancy Fortin	"Oui, je suis décidée"	"Yes, I'm decided"	Quebec French
Simona Nae	"Eu mai am un pic"	"I have a little bit"	Romanian
Anna Buturlina	"Только цель" (Tol'ko tsel')	"Only purpose"	Russian
Helena Krajčíová	"Mám Svoj Sen"	"I got my dream"	Slovak
Katarina Bordner	"Vidim tam"	"I see there"	Slovene
Pauline Kamusewu	"Nästan Där"	"Almost There"	Swedish
Wichayanee Pia-Klin	"ใกล้ถึงฝัน" (Kıl̂ t̄hụng f̄ạn)	"Near the Dream"	Thai
Demet Tuncer	"Yakında orda"	"Soon there"	Turkish
Katyko Purtseladze	"До Щастя Крок" (Do Shchastya Krok)	"Step To Happiness"	Ukrainian

== Certifications ==
Region	Certification	Certified units/sales
United Kingdom (BPI)	Gold	400,000^{‡}
United States (RIAA)	Platinum	1,000,000^{‡}
^{‡} Sales+streaming figures based on certification alone.
