= The Princess and the Frog =

2009 Disney animated film

- Theatrical release poster
- Directed by: John Musker; Ron Clements
- Screenplay by: Ron Clements; John Musker; Rob Edwards
- Story by: Ron Clements; John Musker; Greg Erb; Jason Oremland
- Based on: The Frog Princess by E. D. Baker; "The Frog Prince" by Brothers Grimm
- Produced by: Peter Del Vecho
- Starring: Anika Noni Rose; Bruno Campos; Keith David; Michael-Leon Wooley; Jennifer Cody; Jim Cummings; Peter Bartlett; Jenifer Lewis; Oprah Winfrey; Terrence Howard; John Goodman
- Edited by: Jeff Draheim
- Music by: Randy Newman
- Production company: Walt Disney Animation Studios
- Distributed by: Walt Disney Studios Motion Pictures (Note: Distributed under the Walt Disney Pictures banner.)
- Release dates: November 15, 2009 (Walt Disney Studios lot); December 11, 2009 (United States)
- Running time: 97 minutes
- Country: United States
- Language: English
- Budget: $105 million
- Box office: $271 million

The Princess and the Frog is a 2009 American animated musical fantasy comedy film produced by Walt Disney Animation Studios. Inspired in part by the 2002 novel The Frog Princess by E. D. Baker, the story is a modern adaptation of the German folk tale "The Frog Prince" as collected by the Brothers Grimm. The film was directed by John Musker and Ron Clements, and written by Clements, Musker and Rob Edwards. It stars the voices of Anika Noni Rose, Bruno Campos, Michael-Leon Wooley, Jim Cummings, Jennifer Cody, John Goodman, Keith David, Peter Bartlett, Jenifer Lewis, Oprah Winfrey, and Terrence Howard. Set in New Orleans during the 1920s, the film tells the story of a hardworking waitress named Tiana (Rose) who dreams of opening her own restaurant. After kissing Prince Naveen (Campos), who has been turned into a frog by the evil voodoo witch doctor Facilier (David), Tiana becomes a frog as well and the two must find a way to turn human again before it is too late.

The Princess and the Frog began production in July 2006, under the working title The Frog Princess. It marked Disney's brief return to traditional animation, as it was the mainstream animation studio's first traditionally animated film since Home on the Range (2004). Musker and Clements, directors of Disney Animation's The Great Mouse Detective (1986), The Little Mermaid (1989), Aladdin (1992), Hercules (1997), and Treasure Planet (2002) returned to Disney to direct The Princess and the Frog. The studio returned to a Broadway musical-style format frequently used during the Disney Renaissance, and the film features a score and songs composed and conducted by Randy Newman, well known for his musical involvement in Pixar films such as the Toy Story franchise.

The Princess and the Frog premiered at the Roy E. Disney Animation Building on the Walt Disney Studios lot in Burbank on November 15, 2009, and first opened in a limited release in New York City and Los Angeles on November 25, followed by a wide release on December 11. The film received largely positive reviews from critics, who praised the return to a traditional hand-drawn animation style, though it was criticized for its depiction of Louisiana Voodoo and alleged historical negationism of its depiction of the Southern United States during the Jim Crow era. Although it underperformed by Disney's standards, it grossed $271 million and received three Oscar nominations: Best Animated Feature and two for Best Original Song.

== Plot ==
In 1926, New Orleans, a teenager named Tiana dreams of opening a restaurant. She works two waitress jobs to earn money, leaving no time for a social life. The arrogant Prince Naveen of Maldonia arrives in town, and intends to marry Tiana's wealthy best friend, Charlotte La Bouff, because his parents have cut him off from the family fortune. Charlotte's father, Big Daddy, hosts a masquerade ball in Naveen's honor, and Charlotte asks Tiana to make beignets for the party, paying her enough to buy an old mill to convert into her restaurant. Naveen and his valet, Lawrence, encounter Dr. Facilier, an evil voodoo witch doctor who plans to rule New Orleans. Facilier turns Naveen into a frog and Lawrence into a doppelganger of Naveen, using a voodoo talisman containing Naveen's blood. Facilier intends for the disguised Lawrence to marry Charlotte, then kill her father with a voodoo doll so he can gain the La Bouff fortune.

At the ball, Tiana learns she has been outbid for the mill and accidentally spills food on her outfit, so Charlotte lends her a princess costume. Feeling disheartened, she begins wishing on a star when Naveen appears. Mistaking Tiana for an actual princess, he asks her to kiss him to break the spell, offering her a reward. Tiana reluctantly agrees to save her restaurant, but instead turns into a frog as well. They are chased into a nearby bayou, where they meet a jazz-loving alligator named Louis. When they explain their predicament, he suggests they seek the help of Mama Odie, another voodoo practitioner who lives in the bayou. The trio comes across a Cajun firefly named Ray who helps them find Mama Odie's abode and he had a girlfriend named Evangeline, an Evening Star in the sky. During the journey, Tiana and Naveen begin developing romantic feelings for each other, especially after Naveen learns to be more responsible.

Meanwhile, when the talisman containing Naveen's blood runs out, Facilier asks his "friends on the other side", a legion of voodoo spirits, to help retrieve Naveen, offering them the souls of the city's population once he succeeds in taking over, and they grant him an army of shadow demons for his bidding. Mama Odie confirms that only Naveen kissing a princess can break the spell. Tiana realizes that since Charlotte's father has been crowned Mardi Gras king, Charlotte will be a princess until midnight. The group hitches a ride on a steamboat back to New Orleans, during which Naveen tells Ray about his love for Tiana and plans to propose marriage to her. After talking to Tiana, Naveen selflessly decides against proposing, since transforming him and Tiana into humans and financing Tiana's restaurant is contingent on him marrying Charlotte. The shadow demons capture Naveen and bring him to Facilier to replenish the talisman with Naveen's blood. After Ray tells Tiana of Naveen's love for her, Tiana heads to the Mardi Gras parade to find Naveen, only to see the disguised Lawrence marrying Charlotte.

Ray rescues the real Naveen and steals the talisman, but is mortally wounded by Facilier, who then offers to make Tiana's dream come true in exchange for the talisman. Refusing to dishonor her father, Tiana destroys the talisman into the ground, leading the voodoo spirits to claim Facilier’s soul and drag him into the underworld as punishment for failing to pay back his debt. After Lawrence is arrested, Tiana reveals her love to Naveen, and Charlotte agrees to kiss Naveen, but the clock strikes midnight before she can do so. Tiana and Naveen see Ray die, being held by Louis, and Ray is reincarnated as a star beside Evangeline in the night sky in front of his friends and his firefly family in a bayou during his funeral.

Tiana and Naveen are wed by Mama Odie and then restored to human form when they kiss, since Tiana is now truly a princess. They return to New Orleans and open their restaurant, named Tiana's Palace, as Ray and Evangeline watch them dancing together.

== Voice cast ==
- Anika Noni Rose as Tiana, a 19-year-old African American waitress who dreams of owning her own restaurant. She is an intelligent, hardworking, and independent teenager, but always puts work over other things in life such as love, fun, and family. Mark Henn was the supervising animator for Tiana.
- Bruno Campos as Prince Naveen, the prince of Maldonia. Naveen is a 20-year-old amateur musician and playboy who has been cut off from his family's riches until he learns the value of responsibility. Randy Haycock served as the supervising animator of Naveen in both human and frog form.
- Keith David as Dr. Facilier, (nicknamed "Shadow Man") a voodoo bokor (witch doctor) who plans to rule New Orleans with help from his "Friends on the Other Side" and the main antagonist of the film. He is modeled off of Baron Samedi and/or Ghede Nibo wearing a tailcoat and top hat. Bruce W. Smith, supervising animator of Doctor Facilier, jokingly referred to the character as the "lovechild" of Cruella de Vil and Captain Hook. Smith was nominated for the Annie Award for Character Animation in a Feature Production for his work.
- Michael-Leon Wooley as Louis, a friendly yet neurotic trumpet-playing anthropomorphic alligator whose dream is to play his trumpet in a jazz band. His name comes from the famous jazz artist and trumpeter Louis Armstrong. Trumpeter Terence Blanchard performed the music for Louis. Eric Goldberg, the supervising animator of Louis and other miscellaneous characters, won the Annie Award for Character Animation in a Feature Production for his work on the film.
- Jennifer Cody as Charlotte "Lottie" La Bouff, a 19-year-old wealthy White débutante and Tiana's best friend since childhood who dreams of marrying a prince. Though she is initially spoiled and self-centered, she has a heart of gold and cares deeply for Tiana's well-being, going as far as giving up her chance to be a princess when she sees that Prince Naveen and Tiana are truly in love. Nik Ranieri served as the supervising animator of Charlotte as an adult and child. Jennifer Cody won the Annie Award for Voice Acting in a Feature Production for her performance.
- Jim Cummings as Ray, a middle-aged Cajun firefly. He and his vast family are close friends with Mama Odie, so he offers to help the frogs find her. Ray has an unrequited love for the evening star, which he believes is a lady firefly named "Evangeline" (a reference to the 19th-century Longfellow poem). Mike Surrey was the supervising animator for Ray. Ray's name comes from the blind pianist Ray Charles.
- Peter Bartlett as Lawrence, Prince Naveen's pudgy valet, whom Dr. Facilier recruits as a partner in his scheme by transforming him to look like Naveen using a blood charm. Anthony DeRosa was the supervising animator for the Lawrence character, whose design was influenced by the Jasper and Horace Badun and Mr. Smee.
- Jenifer Lewis as Mama Odie, a blind, 197-year-old voodoo priestess, who serves as the film's "fairy godmother figure". Andreas Deja was the supervising animator for both Mama Odie and her pet snake, Juju, and was nominated for the Annie Award for Character Animation in a Feature Production.
- Oprah Winfrey as Eudora, Tiana's mother, who wants to see her happy and is concerned that Tiana focuses too much on her dream of owning a restaurant. Ruben A. Aquino animated both Eudora and her husband, James.
- Terrence Howard as James, Tiana's father, who helped instill a strong work ethic in Tiana
- John Goodman as Eli "Big Daddy" La Bouff, a wealthy Southern sugar mill owner and Charlotte's father. While he spoils his daughter with everything she asks for, he is a loving and generous man and loves Tiana's cooking. Duncan Marjoribanks was the supervising animator for La Bouff.
- Ritchie Montgomery, Don Hall, and Paul Briggs as Reggie, Darnell, and Two-Fingers, three bumbling frog hunters who try to catch Tiana and Naveen as frogs. Their resemblance to The Three Stooges has been noted.
- Corey Burton and Jerry Kernion as the Fenner Brothers, two antagonistic real estate agents who eventually sell Tiana the sugar mill under duress after initially refusing because someone else was offering to pay for it in cash and because they believed that Tiana would not be able to manage it.
- Kevin Michael Richardson and Emeril Lagasse as Ian and Marlon, two of a congregation of wild and hot-tempered alligators who try to eat Tiana and Naveen while they are transformed into frogs.

The film's composer Randy Newman makes a brief cameo as Ray's "Cousin Randy"; the character is also designed to resemble Newman.

== Production ==
=== Early development ===
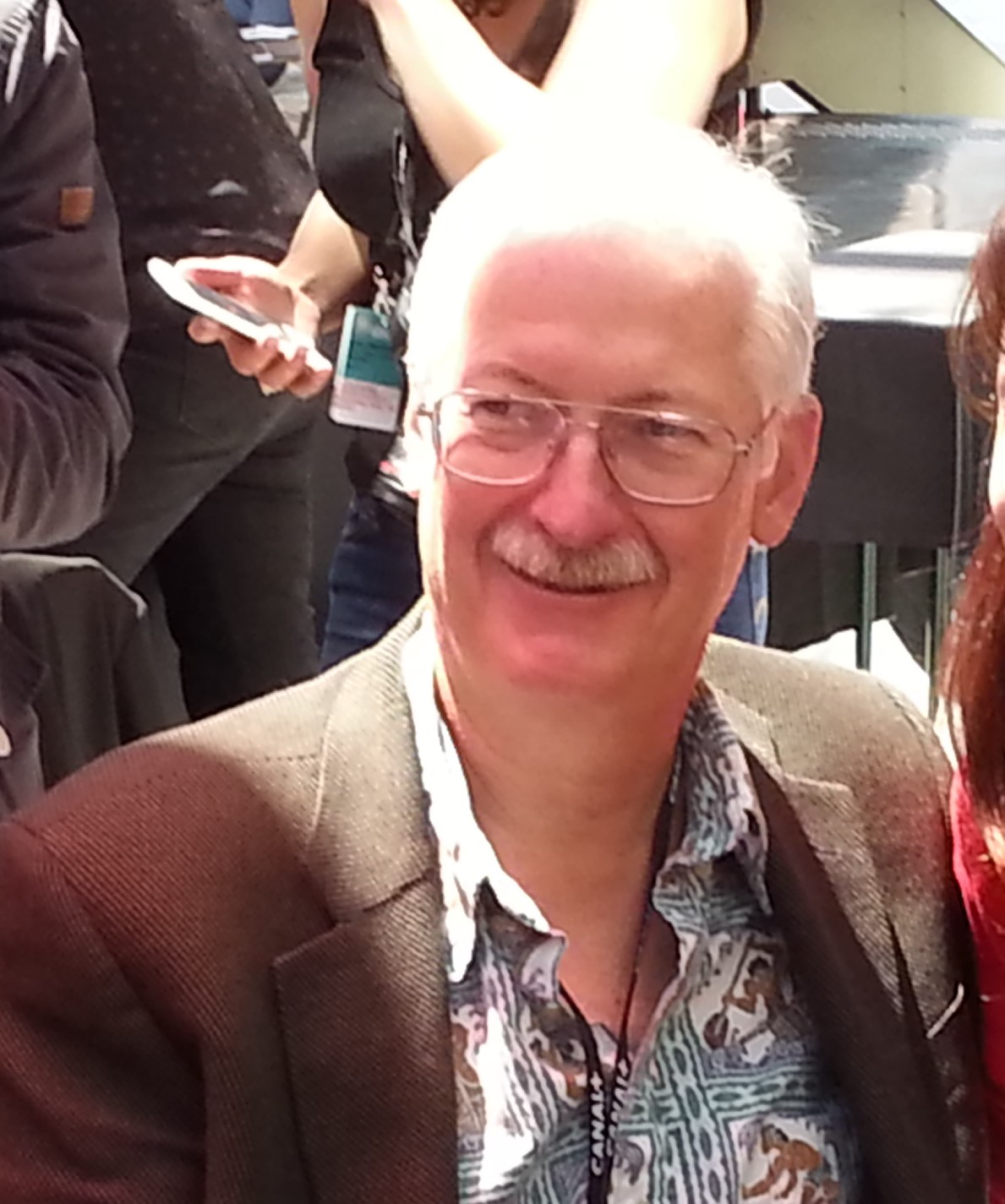
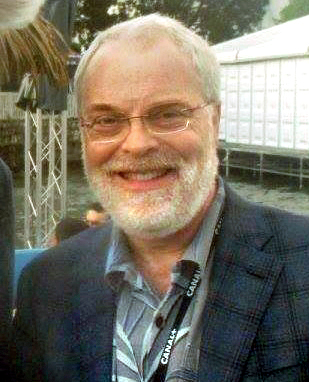
After initially leaving the studio in 2005, John Musker (left) and Ron Clements were both persuaded to return to the studio to write and direct a film in any style of animation they wished.

Disney had once announced that 2004's Home on the Range would be their last traditionally animated film. After the company's acquisition of Pixar in 2006, Ed Catmull and John Lasseter, the new president and chief creative officer of Disney Animation Studios, reversed this decision and reinstated hand-drawn animation at the studio. Many animators who had either been laid off or had left the studio when the traditional animation units were dissolved in 2003 were located and re-hired for the project. Lasseter also brought back directors Ron Clements and John Musker, whose earlier works include The Great Mouse Detective (1986), The Little Mermaid (1989), Aladdin (1992), Hercules (1997), and Treasure Planet (2002). The duo had left the company in 2005, but Lasseter requested their return to Disney to direct and write the film and had let them choose the style of animation (traditional or CGI) they wanted to use.

The film's story began development by merging two projects in development at Disney and Pixar at the time, both based around "The Frog Prince" fairy tale. One of the projects was based on E. D. Baker's The Frog Princess, in which the story's heroine (Princess Emma) kisses a prince turned frog (Prince Eadric), only to become a frog herself. The other was based on Ralph Eggleston's pitch of The Frog Prince set in gangster-era Chicago. Jorgen Klubien separately claimed that a story he was developing at Pixar tentatively titled The Spirit of New Orleans served as inspiration for the film. The Princess and the Frog returns to the musical film format used in many of the previously successful Disney animated films, with a style Musker and Clements declared, like with Aladdin and The Little Mermaid, had inspiration from Golden Age Disney features such as Cinderella (1950). Musker and Clements thought that given so many fairy tales were set in Europe, they could do an American fairy tale. They stated that they chose New Orleans as a tribute to the history of the city, for its "magical" qualities, and because it was Lasseter's favorite city. The directors spent ten days in Louisiana before starting to write the film.

The Princess and the Frog was originally announced as The Frog Princess in July 2006, and early concepts and songs were presented to the public at the Walt Disney Company's annual shareholders' meeting in March 2007. These announcements drew criticism from African-American media outlets, due to elements of the Frog Princess story, characters, and settings considered distasteful. African-American critics disapproved of the original name for the heroine, "Maddy", due to its similarity to the derogatory word term "mammy". Also protested were Maddy's original career as a chambermaid, the choice to have the Black heroine's love interest be a non-Black prince, and the use of a Black male voodoo witchdoctor as the film's villain. The Frog Princess title was also thought by critics to be a slur on French people. Also questioned was the film's setting of New Orleans, which had been heavily damaged by Hurricane Katrina in 2005, resulting in the expulsion of a large number of mostly Black residents. Critics claimed the choice of New Orleans as the setting for a Disney film with a Black heroine was an affront to the Katrina victims' plight. In response to these early criticisms, the film's title was changed in May 2007 from The Frog Princess to The Princess and the Frog. The name "Maddy" was changed to "Tiana", and the character's occupation was altered from chambermaid to waitress. Talk show host Oprah Winfrey was hired as a technical consultant for the film, leading to her taking a voice-acting role in the film as Tiana's mother, Eudora.

=== Writing and themes ===
The head of story, Don Hall, described the plot as a fairy tale "twisted enough that it seems new and fresh", with a kingdom that is a modern city, a handsome prince that is a "knuckleheaded playboy" and a variation on the fairy godmother with Mama Odie. Co-writer Rob Edwards also said The Princess and the Frog was "a princess movie for people who don't like princess movies". As the writers thought Tiana's character motivation of simply dreaming of having her own restaurant was not appealing enough, they expanded so it was her father's as well, with the extra philosophy of "food bringing people together from all walks of life". Musker and Clements stated that while Tiana already starts as a sympathetic character, the events of the plot make her "understand things in a deeper level" and change people around her. Both protagonists would learn from each other—Naveen to take responsibilities, Tiana to enjoy life—as well as figuring from Ray's passion for Evangeline that the perfect balance is brought by having someone you love to share the experience. Tiana became the first African American Disney Princess. Tiana was inspired in part by famed restaurateur Leah Chase, whom Clements and Musker met on their research trip to New Orleans. Clements elaborated, "There's a woman in New Orleans named Lee (sic) Chase who was a waitress and ultimately opened a restaurant with her husband … we met with her and we talked with her and she went to kind of into her story, her philosophy about food, which is a big element of the movie."

=== Voice cast ===
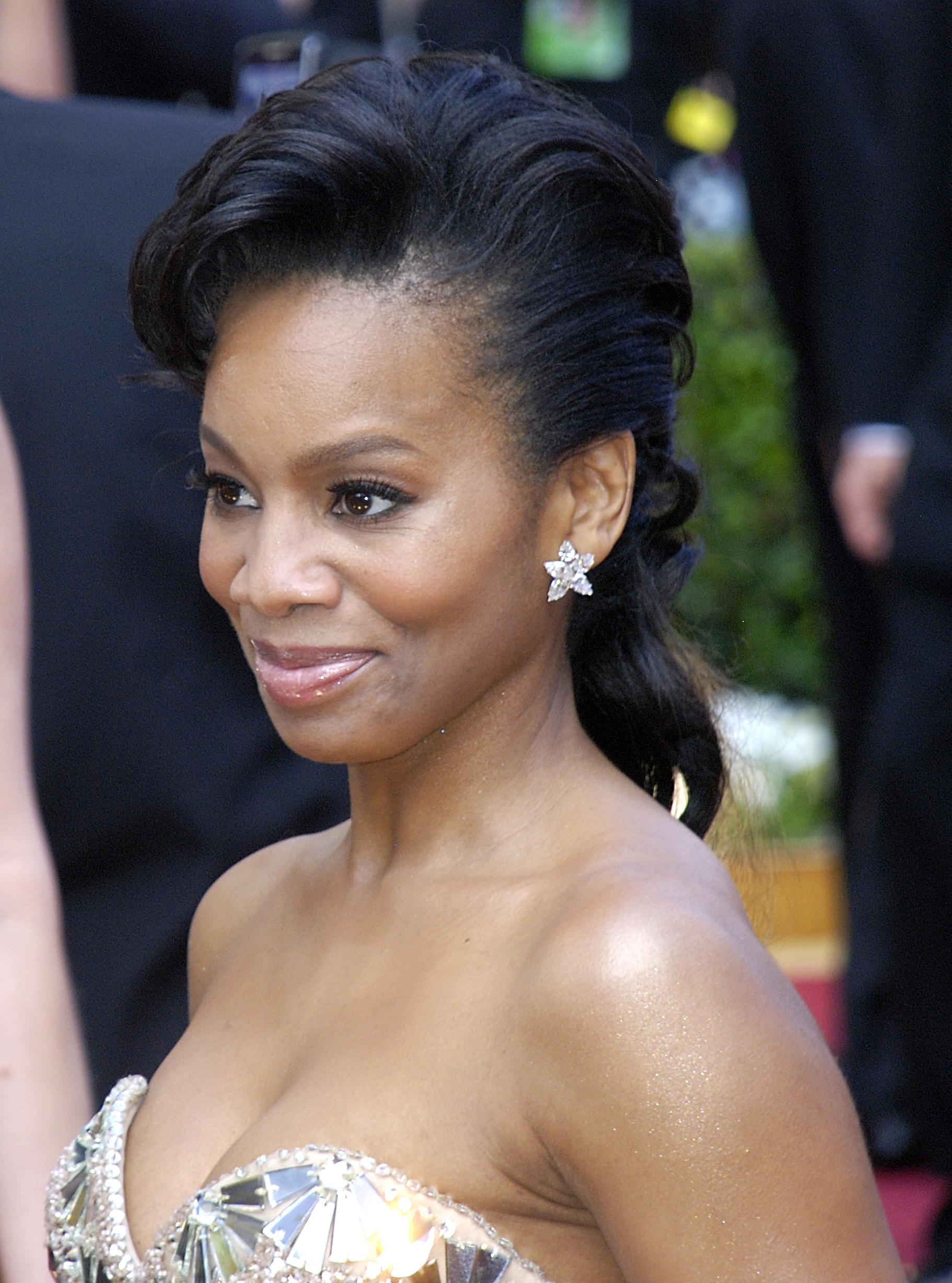
Anika Noni Rose voices Tiana.

On December 1, 2006, a detailed casting call was announced for the film at the Manhattan Theatre Source forum. The casting call states the film as being an American fairy tale musical set in New Orleans during the 1926 Jazz Age and provides a detailed list of the film's major characters. In February 2007, it was reported that Dreamgirls actresses Jennifer Hudson and Anika Noni Rose were top contenders for the voice of Tiana and that Alicia Keys directly contacted then-Walt Disney Studios chairman Dick Cook about voicing the role. It was later reported that Tyra Banks was being considered for the role. Beyoncé was contacted to audition for the role, but she refused as she was expecting an offer not an audition. By April 2007, it was confirmed that Rose would be voicing Tiana. Three months later, it was reported that Keith David was cast as Doctor Facilier, the villain of the film.

=== Animation and design ===
Clements and Musker had agreed early on that the style they were aiming for was primarily that of Lady and the Tramp (1955), a film which they and John Lasseter feel represents "the pinnacle of Disney's style". "After that, everything started becoming more stylized, like Sleeping Beauty, 101 Dalmatians—which are fantastic films as well, but there's a particular style (to Lady and the Tramp) that's so classically Disney." Lady and the Tramp also heavily informed the style of the New Orleans scenes, while Disney's Bambi (1942) served as the template for the bayou scenes. Bambi was described as a stylistic reference for the painted backgrounds, as according to art director Ian Gooding "Bambi painted what it feels like to be in the forest instead of the forest" so The Princess and the Frog would in turn try capturing the essence of roaming through New Orleans.

The former trend in Disney's hand-drawn features where the characters and cinematography were influenced by a CGI-look had been abandoned. Andreas Deja, a veteran Disney animator who supervised the character of Mama Odie, says "I always thought that maybe we should distinguish ourselves to go back to what 2D is good at, which is focusing on what the line can do rather than volume, which is a CG kind of thing. So we are doing less extravagant Treasure Planet kind of treatments. You have to create a world but [we're doing it more simply]. What we're trying to do with Princess and the Frog is hook up with things that the old guys did earlier. It's not going to be graphic...". Deja also mentioned that Lasseter was aiming for the Disney sculptural and dimensional look of the 1950s: "All those things that were non-graphic, which means go easy on the straight lines and have one volume flow into the other—an organic feel to the drawing." Lasseter also felt that traditional animation created more character believability. For example, with Louis the alligator, created by Eric Goldberg, Lasseter said: "It's the believability of this large character being able to move around quite like that." Choreographer Betsy Baytos was brought by the directors to lead a team of eccentric dancers that gave reference to make each character a different style of movement. The character design tried to create beautiful drawings through subtle shapes, particularly for most characters being human. For the frog versions of Tiana and Naveen, while the animators started with realistic designs, they eventually went for stylized designs "removing all that is unappealing in frogs", similar to Jiminy Cricket in Pinocchio (1940).

Toon Boom Animation's Toon Boom Harmony computer software was used as the main software package for the production of the film, as the Computer Animation Production System (CAPS) system that Disney developed with Pixar in the 1980s for use on their previous traditionally animated films had become now outdated by 2004. The Harmony software was augmented with a number of plug-ins to provide CAPS-like effects such as shading on cheeks and smoke effects. The reinstated traditional unit's first production, a 2007 Goofy cartoon short entitled How to Hook Up Your Home Theater, was partly animated without paper by using Harmony and Wacom Cintiq pressure-sensitive tablets. Animators used traditional, scanned paper-and-pencil drawings to create The Princess and the Frog. The one exception to the new Toon Boom Harmony pipeline was the "Almost There" dream sequence, which utilized an Art Deco graphic style based on the art of Harlem Renaissance painter Aaron Douglas. Supervised by Eric Goldberg and designed by Sue Nichols, the "Almost There" sequence's character animation was done on paper without going through the clean-up animation department, and scanned directly into Photoshop. The artwork was then enhanced to effect the appearance of painted strokes and fills, and combined with backgrounds, using Adobe After Effects.

The visual effects and backgrounds for the film were created digitally using Cintiq tablet displays. Marlon West, one of Disney's veteran animation visual effects supervisors, says about the production; "Those guys had this bright idea to bring back hand-drawn animation, but everything had to be started again from the ground up. One of the first things we did was focus on producing shorts, to help us re-introduce the 2D pipeline. I worked as vfx supervisor on the Goofy short, How to Hook Up Your Home Theater. It was a real plus for the effects department, so we went paperless for The Princess and the Frog." The backgrounds were painted digitally using Adobe Photoshop, and many of the architectural elements were based upon 3D models built in Autodesk Maya. Much of the clean-up animation, digital ink-and-paint, and compositing were outsourced to third-party companies in Orlando, Florida (Premise Entertainment), Toronto, Ontario, Canada (Yowza! Animation), and Brooklin, São Paulo, Brazil (HGN Produções).

=== Music ===
In February 2006, Alan Menken was initially reported to be composing the soundtrack. However, Lasseter thought that since Menken was scoring the Disney film Enchanted (2007) at the time, the music might be too repetitive. Lasseter instead hired Randy Newman, with whom he had previously worked with at Pixar. Musker however said he and Clements had suggested Newman since he was a jazz composer and grew up in New Orleans. In February 2007, Newman was announced as the film's new composer.

During Disney's 2007 shareholder meeting, Newman and the Dirty Dozen Brass Band performed the film's opening number, "Down in New Orleans", with famous New Orleans singer Dr. John singing, while slides of pre-production art from the film played on a screen. Other songs in the film include "Almost There" (a solo for Tiana), "Dig a Little Deeper" (a song for Mama Odie), "When We're Human" (a song for Louis, Tiana and Naveen [as frogs]), "Friends on the Other Side" (a solo for Doctor Facilier), and "Gonna Take You There" and "Ma Belle Evangeline" (two solos for Ray).

Newman composed, arranged, and conducted the music for the film, a mixture of jazz, zydeco, blues, and gospel styles performed by the voice cast members for the respective characters, while R&B singer-songwriter Ne-Yo wrote and performed the end title song, "Never Knew I Needed", an R&B love song referring to the romance between the film's two main characters, Tiana and Naveen. Supported by a music video by Melina, "Never Knew I Needed" was issued to radio outlets as a commercial single from the Princess and the Frog soundtrack. The film's soundtrack album contains the ten original songs from the film and seven instrumental pieces. The soundtrack was released on November 23, 2009, the day before the limited release of the film in New York and Los Angeles.

== Release ==
The film premiered in theaters with a limited run in New York and Los Angeles beginning on November 25, 2009, followed by wide release on December 11, 2009. The film was originally set for release on Christmas Day 2009, but its release date was changed due to a competing family film, Alvin and the Chipmunks: The Squeakquel, scheduled for release the same day. The Princess and the Frog received a limited re-release in AMC Theatres, lasting for one week from October 6 to 12, 2017, as part of the Dream Big, Princess campaign. As part of Disney's 100th anniversary the film was re-released in cinemas across the UK on October 6, 2023 for one week.

=== Marketing ===
The first teaser trailer for the film was released on July 30, 2008.

The film was supported by a wide array of merchandise leading up to and following the film's release. Although Disney's main marketing push was not set to begin until November 2009, positive word-of-mouth promotion created demand for merchandise well in advance of the film. Princess Tiana costumes were selling out prior to Halloween 2009, and a gift set of Tiana-themed hair-care products from Carol's Daughter sold out in seven hours on the company's website. Other planned merchandise includes a cookbook for children and even a wedding gown. Princess Tiana was also featured a few months before the release in the Disney on Ice: Let's Celebrate! show. The film itself was promoted through advertisements, including one from GEICO where Naveen, as a frog, converses with the company's gecko mascot.

A live parade and show called Tiana's Showboat Jubilee! premiered on October 25, 2009, at the Magic Kingdom theme park at Walt Disney World Resort in Florida and on November 5 at Disneyland in California. In Disneyland, actors in New Orleans Square paraded to the Rivers of America and boarded the park's steamboat. From there, the cast, starring Princess Tiana, Prince Naveen, Louis the alligator, and Doctor Facilier, would sing songs from the movie, following a short story line taking place after the events of the film. The Disneyland version's actors actually partook in singing, while the Walt Disney World rendition incorporated lip-syncing.

Tiana's Showboat Jubilee! ran at both parks until January 3, 2010. At Disneyland Park, the show was replaced by a land-based event called Princess Tiana's Mardi Gras Celebration, which features Princess Tiana along with five of the original presentation's "Mardi Gras dancers" and the park's "Jambalaya Jazz Band" as they perform songs from the movie. "Tiana's Mardi Gras Celebration" officially ended on October 3, 2010. However, it returned to Disneyland from 2011–2013 as part of the "Limited Time Magic" family-fun weekends. Tiana also appears in Disneyland Paris's New Generation Festival. Some of the characters appear frequently during World of Color, the nightly fountain and projection show presented at Disney California Adventure.

=== Home media ===
The Princess and the Frog was released in North America on DVD and Blu-ray on March 16, 2010. The film is available on DVD, Blu-ray, and Blu-ray combo pack editions. The combo pack includes the DVD, Digital Copy, and Blu-ray of the film. The DVD edition has sold over 4.5 million copies and has made $71.8 million in DVD sales, making it the ninth-best-selling DVD of 2010. As of 2019, the film had earned $117 million from its domestic home media releases. The Princess and the Frog was released on 4K Blu-ray on November 5, 2019, and has also been made available to stream on Disney+.

== Reception ==
=== Box office ===
On its limited day release, the film grossed $263,890 at two theaters and grossed $786,190 its opening weekend. On its opening day in wide release, the film grossed $7 million at 3,434 theaters. It went on to gross $24.2 million over the opening weekend averaging $7,050 per theater, ranking at #1 for the weekend, and making it the highest-grossing opening to date for an animated movie in December (a record previously held by Beavis and Butt-Head Do America from 1996). The film went on to gross $104.4 million in the United States and Canada, and $271 million worldwide. It was the fifth-highest-grossing animated film of 2009, which was deemed an underachievement by Disney's standards. Overall, the film was considered a qualified commercial success against greater production and pre-release hopes.

While the film outgrossed Disney's contemporaneous hand-drawn films of the 2000s – including The Emperor's New Groove (2000), Atlantis: The Lost Empire (2001), Treasure Planet (2002), Brother Bear (2003), and Home on the Range (2004) – it had a considerably less auspicious time than the animated films from the Disney Renaissance. Disney animator Tom Sito compared the film's performance to that of The Great Mouse Detective (1986), which had been a step up from the theatrical run of the 1985 box office failure The Black Cauldron (both films presaged upcoming commercial returns to form for Disney, with The Great Mouse Detective, in particular, cited as a self-successful inflection point towards the Renaissance, including by Disney internally). It has been opined that part of the film's modest return could be ascribed to being overshadowed by the release of James Cameron's Avatar a week after its release. The film's fiscal shortcoming was a major reason for the changing of title of the next year's Tangled from "Rapunzel" in order to dissociate from The Princess and the Frog and the entire vacillating Disney Princess concept (Tangled would almost double its predecessor's box office take).

=== Critical response ===
Review aggregator Rotten Tomatoes reported the film has an approval rating of 86% based on 200 reviews, with an average rating of 7.5/10. The site's critics consensus reads: "The warmth of traditional Disney animation makes this occasionally lightweight fairy-tale update a lively and captivating confection for the holidays." On Metacritic, the film has a weighted average score of 73 out of 100 based on 29 critics, indicating "generally favorable reviews". Audiences polled by CinemaScore gave the film an average grade of "A" on an A+ to F scale.

Lisa Schwarzbaum of Entertainment Weekly gave the film an "A" grade and applauded the film's creative team for "uphold[ing] the great tradition of classic Disney animation". Kirk Honeycutt of The Hollywood Reporter praised Walt Disney Animation for "rediscovering its traditional hand-drawn animation" and for "a thing called story". David Germain of the Associated Press wrote that "The Princess and the Frog is not the second coming of Beauty and the Beast or The Lion King. It's just plain pleasant, an old-fashioned little charmer that's not straining to be the next glib animated compendium of pop-culture flotsam."

Justin Chang of Variety was less receptive, stating "this long-anticipated throwback to a venerable house style never comes within kissing distance of the studio's former glory". Joe Neumaier of the New York Daily News gave the film three stars out of five stars while saying "The Princess and the Frog breaks the color barrier for Disney princesses, but is a throwback to traditional animation and her story is a retread". Village Voice's Scott Foundas found that "the movie as a whole never approaches the wit, cleverness, and storytelling brio of the studio's early-1990s animation renaissance (Beauty and the Beast, The Lion King) or pretty much anything by Pixar". Betsy Sharkey, formerly of the Los Angeles Times, gave the film a positive review claiming: "With The Princess and the Frog they've gotten just about everything right. The dialogue is fresh-prince clever, the themes are ageless, the rhythms are riotous and the return to a primal animation style is beautifully executed."

Chicago Sun-Times film critic Roger Ebert gave the film three out of four stars and admired Disney's step back to traditional animation, writing, "No 3-D! No glasses! No extra ticket charge! No frantic frenzies of meaningless action! And ... good gravy! A story! Characters! A plot! This is what classic animation once was like!", but stated that the film "inspires memories of Disney's Golden Age it doesn't quite live up to, as I've said, but it's spritely and high-spirited, and will allow kids to enjoy it without visually assaulting them." S. Jhoanna Robledo of Common Sense Media gave the film three out of five stars, writing, "First African-American Disney princess is a good role model". Saint Bryan of KING 5 Seattle praised the film and called it "The Best Disney Movie Since The Lion King".

Upon its release, the film created controversy among some Christians over its use of Louisiana Voodoo as a plot device. Christianity Today's review of the film cited its sexual undertones and use of voodoo, arguing that the scenes with Dr. Facilier and his "Friends on the Other Side" contain many horror elements and that young children might be frightened by the film. The film's negative portrayal of Voodoo also drew criticism from non-Christian factions. The film was also criticized for downplaying the racial segregation and discrimination of 1920s New Orleans; scholars argued that its depiction sanitized aspects of African American life and history under Jim Crow. Separately, a 2021 blog post argued that the film largely erased racism from its depiction of the period, pointing to the near absence of race-based conflict in the story.

=== Awards and nominations ===
The film was nominated for the Academy Award for Best Animated Feature and twice for the Academy Award for Best Original Song, but lost to Up and Crazy Heart, respectively. It was also nominated for eight Annie Awards and at the 37th Annie Awards Ceremony on February 6, 2010, won three.

Award	Category	Nominee	Result
2009 Satellite Awards	Best Motion Picture, Animated or Mixed Media	The Princess and the Frog	Nominated
2009 Satellite Awards	Best Original Song	Randy Newman (Almost There)	Nominated
2009 Satellite Awards	Best Original Song	Randy Newman (Down in New Orleans)	Nominated
African-American Film Critics Association Awards 2009	Top 10 Films	The Princess and the Frog	Won
African-American Film Critics Association Awards 2009	Best Screenplay	John Musker, Ron Clements and Rob Edwards — Tied with Geoffrey Fletcher for Precious: Based on the Novel "Push" by Sapphire	Won
2009 Producers Guild of America Awards	Animated Theatrical Motion Pictures	Peter Del Vecho	Nominated
2009 Online Film Critics Society Awards	Best Animated Feature	The Princess and the Frog	Nominated
67th Golden Globe Awards	Best Animated Feature Film	The Princess and the Frog	Nominated
2009 Chicago Film Critics Association	Best Animated Feature	The Princess and the Frog	Nominated
2009 Critics Choice Awards	Best Animated Feature	The Princess and the Frog	Nominated
2009 Critics Choice Awards	Best Score	Randy Newman	Nominated
2009 Critics Choice Awards	Best Song (Almost There)	Randy Newman	Nominated
2009 Black Reel Awards	Best Film	The Princess and the Frog	Nominated
2009 Black Reel Awards	Best Song, Original or Adapted	Ne-Yo (Never Knew I Needed)	Nominated
2009 Black Reel Awards	Best Song, Original or Adapted	Anika Noni Rose (Almost There)	Won
2009 Black Reel Awards	Best Song, Original or Adapted	Anika Noni Rose (Down in New Orleans)	Nominated
2009 Black Reel Awards	Best Voice Performance	Keith David	Nominated
2009 Black Reel Awards	Best Voice Performance	Anika Noni Rose	Won
2009 Black Reel Awards	Best Ensemble	The Princess and the Frog	Nominated
37th Annie Awards	Best Animated Feature	The Princess and the Frog	Nominated
37th Annie Awards	Animated Effects	James DeValera Mansfield	Won
37th Annie Awards	Production Design in a Feature Production	Ian Gooding	Nominated
37th Annie Awards	Character Animation in a Feature Production	Andreas Deja	Nominated
37th Annie Awards	Character Animation in a Feature Production	Eric Goldberg	Won
37th Annie Awards	Character Animation in a Feature Production	Bruce W. Smith	Nominated
37th Annie Awards	Voice Acting in a Feature Production	Jennifer Cody ("Charlotte")	Won
37th Annie Awards	Voice Acting in a Feature Production	Jenifer Lewis ("Mama Odie")	Nominated
82nd Academy Awards			Nominated
82nd Academy Awards	Best Animated Feature	John Musker and Ron Clements	Nominated
82nd Academy Awards	Best Original Song	Randy Newman (Almost There)	Nominated
82nd Academy Awards	Best Original Song	Randy Newman (Down in New Orleans)	Nominated
41st NAACP Image Awards	Outstanding Motion Picture		Nominated
41st NAACP Image Awards	Outstanding Actress in a Motion Picture	Anika Noni Rose	Nominated
36th Saturn Awards	Best Animated Film	The Princess and the Frog	Nominated
2010 Teen Choice Awards	Choice Movie: Animated	The Princess and the Frog	Nominated
2011 Grammy Awards	Best Song Written for a Motion Picture, Television or Other Visual Media	Randy Newman (Down in New Orleans)	Nominated
Women Film Critics Circle	Best Animated Females	Anika Noni Rose (Tiana), Jennifer Cody (Charlotte La Bouff), Oprah Winfrey (Eudora), Jenifer Lewis (Mama Odie), and all other female characters in The Princess and the Frog.	Won

=== Impact and debates ===
Following The Princess and the Frog, Disney considered releasing at least one hand-drawn animated film every two years, starting with Winnie the Pooh (2011), and continuing with a film inspired by "The Snow Queen". The medium of the latter was later switched to CGI (although it features a similar visual style to the 2010 film Tangled by blending elements of the two media) due to complex visual elements in the story. The film was ultimately titled Frozen, and was released in 2013. The blog website /Film noted in July 2014 with the release of hand-drawn concept art for Frozen (which grossed over US$1 billion worldwide), that any future hand-drawn animated films have been "killed" for the time being due to The Princess and the Frog failing "to ignite the box office". Two months later, however, many Disney artists announced they were working on a new independent hand-drawn animated film, Hullabaloo, as part of an attempt to bring back hand-drawn animation, consisting in three short films, while others got later involved on making the Netflix animated film Klaus, released in 2019.

Looking back on the experience four years later, Catmull stated that Disney had made a "serious mistake" in the process of marketing and releasing the film. Walt Disney Studios' marketing department had warned Disney Animation that the word "princess" in the title "would lead moviegoers to think that the film was for girls only," but the animation studio's management insisted on keeping the "princess" title because they believed that the film's quality and hand-drawn animation would bring in all quadrants anyway. In Catmull's words, this belief "was our own version of a stupid pill." The marketing department turned out to be correct in their prediction that many moviegoers would and did avoid the film because they thought it was "for little girls only." This was further compounded by the fact that the film opened a week before Avatar. Looking back on the experience seven years later, Lasseter told Variety: "I was determined to bring back [hand-drawn animation] because I felt it was such a heritage of the Disney studio, and I love the art form [...] I was stunned that Princess didn't do better. We dug into it and did a lot of research and focus groups. It was viewed as old-fashioned by the audience."

Despite the absence of traditional animated feature films after the release of Winnie the Pooh, Disney Animation has been using both media for the sake of experimenting with new techniques and styles. In 2019, after Lasseter left Disney, Jennifer Lee (the succeeding CCO of Walt Disney Animation Studios), producer Peter Del Vecho and director Chris Buck confirmed that making another 2D animated film is still possible, and that the different styles are driven by the filmmakers who chose what method to use to tell their stories. Since the film's original release, it has had success on streaming platforms and with merchandise sales.

== Other media ==
=== Manga ===
A manga adaptation of the film was released to tie-in to the film's Japanese release.

=== Theme parks ===
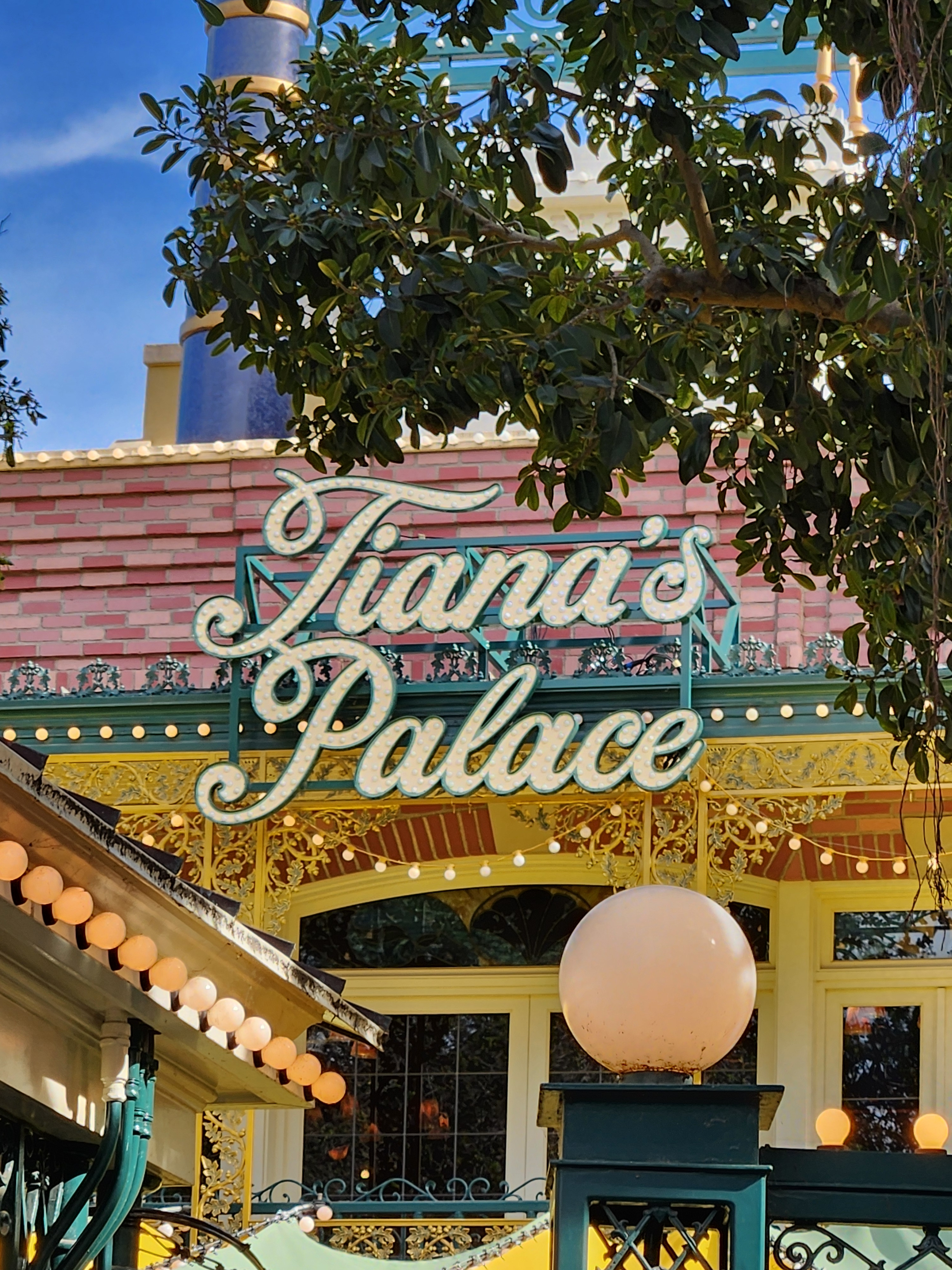
Tiana's Palace restaurant at Disneyland in the park's New Orleans Square area.

Tiana, Naveen, and Dr. Facilier appear as meet-and-greet characters on Main Street, U.S.A., Liberty Square and in Frontierland at the Disney Parks, while Louis appears during parades and live shows.

==== Theme park ride ====
In June 2020, it was announced that the Splash Mountain theme park attraction, which is themed to Disney's 1946 film Song of the South, would be re-themed based on The Princess and the Frog in Disneyland and Magic Kingdom, which was stated to have had been in development since 2019. The announcement came amid the ongoing George Floyd protests and online petitions to change the theme of Splash Mountain. The New York Times reported that Disney executives had privately discussed removing the attraction's Song of the South theme for at least five years, before putting into development the Princess and the Frog theme.

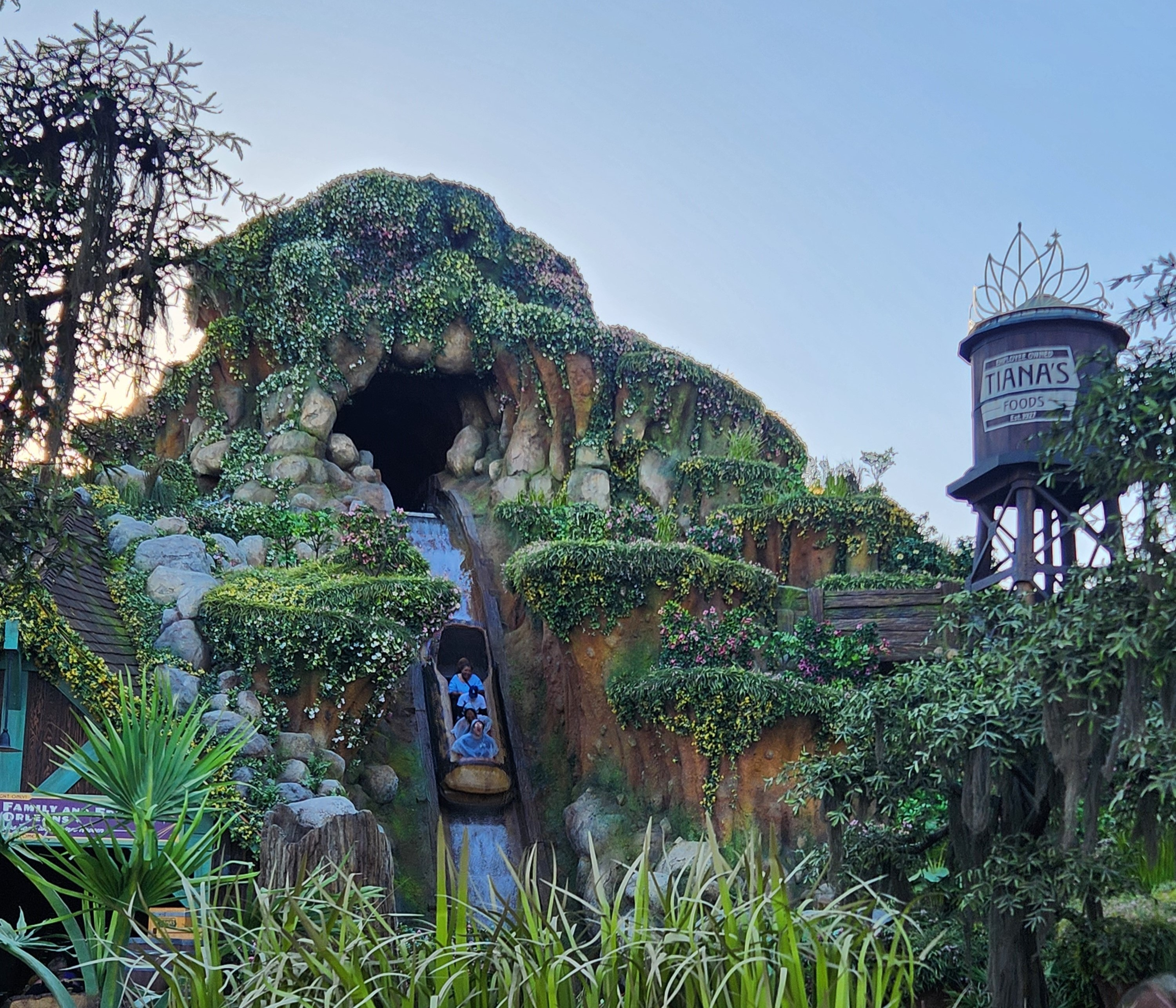
Tiana's Bayou Adventure as it appears at Disneyland.

The attraction's storyline takes place after the events of the film, with Tiana hosting a party for the people of New Orleans during Carnival season. Due to a mix-up, her celebration is missing a band and she needs the guests' help to find one, as they join her and Louis on a trip to the bayou to search for critter musicians. In June 2022, Anika Noni Rose mentioned during an interview on Live with Kelly and Ryan that she had been involved with discussions with Disney on what they wanted the attraction to be like. In July 2022 during the Essence Music Festival in New Orleans, Disney announced that the attraction would be called Tiana's Bayou Adventure, setting an opening date of "late 2024" at both parks. At the D23 Expo in September 2022, it was confirmed that Rose, Bruno Campos, Michael-Leon Wooley, and Jenifer Lewis would be reprising their roles for the attraction. The Magic Kingdom version of Splash Mountain closed in January 2023, while the Disneyland version closed in May 2023. Tiana's Bayou Adventure opened at Magic Kingdom on June 28, 2024 and at Disneyland on November 15, 2024.

=== Films and television ===
==== Cancelled television series and upcoming Disney+ special ====
In December 2020, Disney announced that a television spin-off titled Tiana was in development for Disney+. It was also announced that Anika Noni Rose, who voiced Tiana in the film, would be reprising her role in the series. On November 12, 2021, Stella Meghie was announced as writer and director, making her the first Black Canadian director to helm a Walt Disney Animation Studios project, but was replaced in those capacities by Joyce Sherri by October 2023. Then-Walt Disney Animation Studios chief creative officer Jennifer Lee contacted Meghie for the project following the latter's attempt to pitch a live-action remake of The Princess and the Frog. The series would have centered on Tiana as she explores her city of New Orleans.

A first look of Tiana was revealed in 2021, with the series originally scheduled to release in 2022. The release date was later changed to 2023 and eventually 2024. In March 2023, the show's page changed to "coming soon to Disney+" with mention of a date removed. The series was to be among the first spin-offs of a Walt Disney Animation Studios film to be produced by the studio itself rather than Disney Television Animation. Animation services were to have been provided by Walt Disney Animation Studios' Burbank and Vancouver studios, with storyboarding and pre-production also handled at the Burbank studio.

In March 2025, it was announced that the series had been shelved. The Hollywood Reporter noted; "Sources close to the streaming series say that despite best efforts, including several changes to the creative team, Tiana ultimately could not get to where it needed to be given production costs." Instead, a shortform special inspired by The Princess and the Frog is in development for Disney+. Sherri is still attached as writer and director along with additional director Steve Anderson. In October 2026, the special was officially confirmed by Disney.

==== Upcoming live-action film ====
In July 2026, it was announced that Colman Domingo and Robert O'Hara were in talks to write a live-action film inspired by The Princess and the Frog. The film will not be a remake but rather a spin-off featuring Tiana.

=== Others ===
- Tiana made a guest appearance on Sofia the First in the second-season episode "Winter's Gift".
- Alternate versions of Tiana, Prince Naveen, Eudora, and Dr. Facilier appear in the seventh season of Once Upon a Time. Maldonia also appears as a realm in New Fairy Tale Land.
- Tiana is featured in the 2018 film Ralph Breaks the Internet, alongside all of the other Disney Princesses. However, earlier promo images and trailers from the film showed that her appearance was depicted with a lighter skin tone, a narrower nose, and European features. This led to several backlashes from the viewers on social media as these drew her appearance away from that expected of African-Americans. Disney contacted Anika Noni Rose and the advocacy group Color of Change to redesign Tiana for Ralph Breaks the Internet to make sure that she more closely resembles her actual appearance, which was revealed in the second trailer.
- In the Descendants franchise, Dr. Facilier appears in the novel The Isle of the Lost, being the principal of Dragon Hall, the school for villains' children. Facilier's teen daughter, Freddie, appears as one of the main characters in the animated series Descendants: Wicked World. Dr. Facilier (played by Jamal Sims) appears in Disney Channel's 2019 original film Descendants 3, along with his other teen daughter, Celia. Another descendant of Facilier, his son Felix, is introduced in the 2026 film Descendants: Wicked Wonderland.
- Tiana is one of the main characters in Lego's 2023 animated special Lego Disney Princess: The Castle Quest, and its 2025 sequel Lego Disney Princess: Villains Unite.
- Like other Walt Disney Animation Studios characters, the main characters of the film have cameo appearances in the 2023 short film Once Upon a Studio.

=== Video games ===
- Disney announced on June 4, 2009, that they would release a video game inspired by the film and it was released in November 2009 exclusively for Wii and Nintendo DS platforms. It has been officially described as an "adventure through the exciting world of New Orleans in a family-oriented video game", featuring events from the film and challenges for Princess Tiana.
- Tiana, Prince Naveen, Louis, Mama Odie (along with Juju), Eudora, Charlotte La Bouff, and Dr. Facilier appear as playable characters to unlock for a limited time in the world builder video game Disney Magic Kingdoms, along with some attractions based on locations in the film. In the game, the characters are involved in new storylines that serve as a continuation of the events of the film.
- An alternate version of Tiana appears as a playable character in the video game Disney Mirrorverse (2022).
- Tiana and Prince Naveen appear in Kinect: Disneyland Adventures as characters the player can meet in the park and perform a fetch quest for. There is also a minigame where the player can mirror Tiana's dance moves set to the song "Almost There".

== See also ==
- List of animated feature-length films
- List of traditional animated feature films
- List of Disney theatrical animated features
- List of Disney animated films based on fairy tales
- List of Walt Disney Animation Studios films

== Bibliography ==
- Kurtti, Jeff (2009). The Art of The Princess and the Frog (1st ed.). Chronicle Books. ISBN 978-0-8118-6635-4.
