= Tiana (The Princess and the Frog) =

Fictional character from Disney's 2009 animated film The Princess and the Frog

- The Princess and the Frog character
- Tiana wearing her green dress
- First appearance: The Princess and the Frog (2009)
- Created by: Ron Clements; John Musker
- Based on: Princess Emma from The Frog Princess by E.D. Baker; The Princess from The Frog Prince by the Brothers Grimm
- Voiced by: Anika Noni Rose; Elizabeth M. Dampier (child)

In-universe information
- Full name: Tiana Rogers
- Species: Human; Frog (temporarily via incantation)
- Title: Princess consort of Maldonia
- Occupation: Waitress; Restaurateur
- Affiliation: Disney Princesses
- Family: James Rogers (father); Eudora Rogers (mother)
- Spouse: Prince Naveen
- Relatives: King of Maldonia (father-in-law); Queen of Maldonia (mother-in-law); Prince Ralphie (brother-in-law)

Tiana Rogers is a fictional character in Walt Disney Animation Studios' animated film The Princess and the Frog (2009). Created by writers and directors Ron Clements and John Musker and animated by Mark Henn, Tiana is voiced by Anika Noni Rose, with Elizabeth M. Dampier voicing her as a child. A hardworking waitress who dreams of opening her own restaurant, Tiana finds her ambitions stalled when she kisses a prince named Naveen, who has been turned into a frog by the evil voodoo witch doctor Facilier, only to be transformed into one herself.

She is loosely based on two princesses: Princess Emma from the 2002 novel The Frog Princess by E. D. Baker, and the princess from the Brothers Grimm fairy tale "The Frog Prince". The character also was inspired by famed New Orleans chef Leah Chase.

Tiana has been mostly positively received with critics praising her personality and values. However, the depiction of Tiana and her community has been criticized for lacking "emphasis on racial issues". The decision to depict the two main characters, Tiana and Naveen, as frogs for the majority of the film has also caused controversy, with some saying that it downplays the characters' identities. She is the ninth character added to the Disney Princess franchise, and is known for being the first African American member in the franchise. She is also the most modern princess in the lineup, as her story takes place in 1920s New Orleans.

== Character development ==
=== Conception and ethnicity ===
According to co-director John Musker, adapting the fairy tale "The Frog Prince" by the Brothers Grimm into an animated feature film had been a subject at Walt Disney Animation Studios for 18 years. The project was repeatedly shelved because the studio was unsuccessful in creating a version with which they were satisfied. Disney bought the rights to The Frog Princess, a novel by E. D. Baker that is based on the fairy tale, in 2006. Co-directors Ron Clements and Musker were then hired to lead the studio in yet another attempt at adapting the fairy tale, choosing 1920s New Orleans as its setting. Although originally conceived as a computer-animated film, Clements and Musker fought for The Princess and the Frog to be traditionally animated.

[I]t was certainly about time [for an African American heroine]. But we didn't approach this movie with that as any kind of agenda. John Lasseter suggested taking the fairy tale "The Frog Prince" and setting it in New Orleans. The idea of making our heroine African American simply grew out of the setting and that was an integral part of the story we pitched to John in March of 2006. We all thought it was a great idea. But it wasn't until later that we fully realized the importance of this in the African American community.

— Co-director Ron Clements on their reasoning behind Tiana's ethnicity.

Tiana is loosely based on both Princess Emma, the heroine of Baker's novel, and the princess who appears in the Grimm fairy tale. Clements described Baker's The Frog Princess as "a kind of fairy tale with a twist" because in it "the princess kissed the frog and instead of him turning into a prince she turned into a frog." Clements and Musker pitched the idea for the film to Walt Disney Animation Studios CEO John Lasseter "as a hand-drawn film with an African American heroine", conceiving Tiana "as someone who would never have been a big fan of Disney fairy tales." The character was inspired by famed restaurateur Leah Chase, who Clements and Musker met on their research trip to New Orleans. Clements elaborated, "There's a woman in New Orleans named Lee (sic) Chase who was a waitress and ultimately opened a restaurant with her husband … we met with her and we talked with her and she went to kind of into her story, her philosophy about food, which is a big element of the movie."

Si quis amat Ranam, Ranam putat esse Dianam.
If someone loves a frog, he thinks the frog is Diana.

— Perry 591

Tiana is recognized for being Disney's first African American princess. As the film's writers and directors, Clements and Musker claim that their decision to depict Tiana as an African American young woman came naturally simply as a result of the location in which the story takes place. Clements explained, "We didn't realize it was that big of a deal," and originally gave the character the French name "Madeleine"—"Maddy" for short. However, when the name drew controversy and speculation as a result of alleged racial connotations—according to various sources, the name "Maddy" was commonly used as a "slave name"—they decided to change it to the Greek name "Tiana", which rhymes with "Diana" and rana (Latin for 'frog'). Though "Tiana" (Τιάνα) does not translate as "princess" (πριγκίπισσα), it can be decoded as a portmanteau, coined by blending the princess names Τία and Νταϊάνα. Vying to continue to approach the film with sensitivity, Clements and Musker sought guidance from screenwriter Rob Edwards, who is African American. In order to add emotional weight to the story, Clements and Musker placed further emphasis on Tiana's relationship with her father, James, who originally "wasn't as much in the picture."

=== Voice ===
Directors Ron Clements and John Musker opted against hiring "big stars" to voice the film's main characters, explaining, "It can help with the identification of that animated character with the voice if you don't get an instant mental picture of the real actor." Several well-known African American female entertainers expressed interest in voicing Tiana, including recording artists Beyoncé, Jennifer Hudson and Alicia Keys, and actress and fashion model Tyra Banks. The role of Tiana ultimately went to actress and singer Anika Noni Rose, who co-starred alongside Knowles and Hudson in Dreamgirls (2006). When Rose was personally contacted by Disney about voicing Tiana, her expectations were not particularly high. She explained, "I wasn't planning on being a princess. I thought I'd be like a weeping willow or something." To prepare herself for her audition, Rose made sure that she "had a voice ready." Rose auditioned for the role of Tiana a total of three times.

Both "thrilled" and "ecstatic" by the fact that she would be voicing Disney's first African American princess, Rose, a longtime fan of Disney who had always wanted to voice a Disney character, was "surprised by some of the things that the community took issue with." When the film was brought to her attention, Rose was drawn to it more by "the story of the young woman" rather than Tiana's ethnicity. "I don't think the cultural significance hit me until later," she told The Root.

Rose described the recording process as "very solitary work" that required her to do much research and preparation. She elaborated, "I called people in New Orleans; I listened to their voices to hear what they sounded like. I did a lot of reading up on the city, and listened to a lot of music in the jazz era." Rose gradually received the film's screenplay "in pieces". During her first recording session, Rose read through and recorded the entire script in eight hours, describing the experience as "exhausting, but wonderful." She and co-star Bruno Campos, who provided the voice of Prince Naveen, recorded the majority of their dialogue separately.

=== Design and characteristics ===
Mark Henn served as the supervising animator for Tiana. Henn was hired by Lasseter because he had animated nearly every Disney Princess since Ariel from The Little Mermaid. Describing Tiana, Henn said that she is following "a new trend in our princesses," likening her to Ariel from The Little Mermaid. Henn was inspired by studio employee Jaimie Milner, a film intern who was working in post production. The fact that Tiana is African American was "never a big issue" for Henn when it came to animating her, but drawing her as both a human and a frog proved difficult. He said, "Tiana appears in the movie in so many different forms … she's a little girl, she's an adult human, and then she's a frog".

Rose's thoughts, ideas and concerns were taken into consideration when it came to finalizing Tiana's design. "I … said I wanted it to look like she ate and wasn't skinny, and she has a full mouth and a little round nose and curly hair and these are all things that made her look distinctly herself," she said. Rose didn't want Tiana to resemble "a cookie-cutter princess who had been coloured in brown. When I saw her for the first time and realized how much she looked like me I was really blown away." Rose also served as a form of visual, live-action reference for supervising animator Mark Henn as he worked on Tiana, videotaping her as she recorded her lines and incorporating some of her distinct characteristics, such as her dimples and left-handedness, into Tiana's design.

== Appearances ==
=== The Princess and the Frog ===
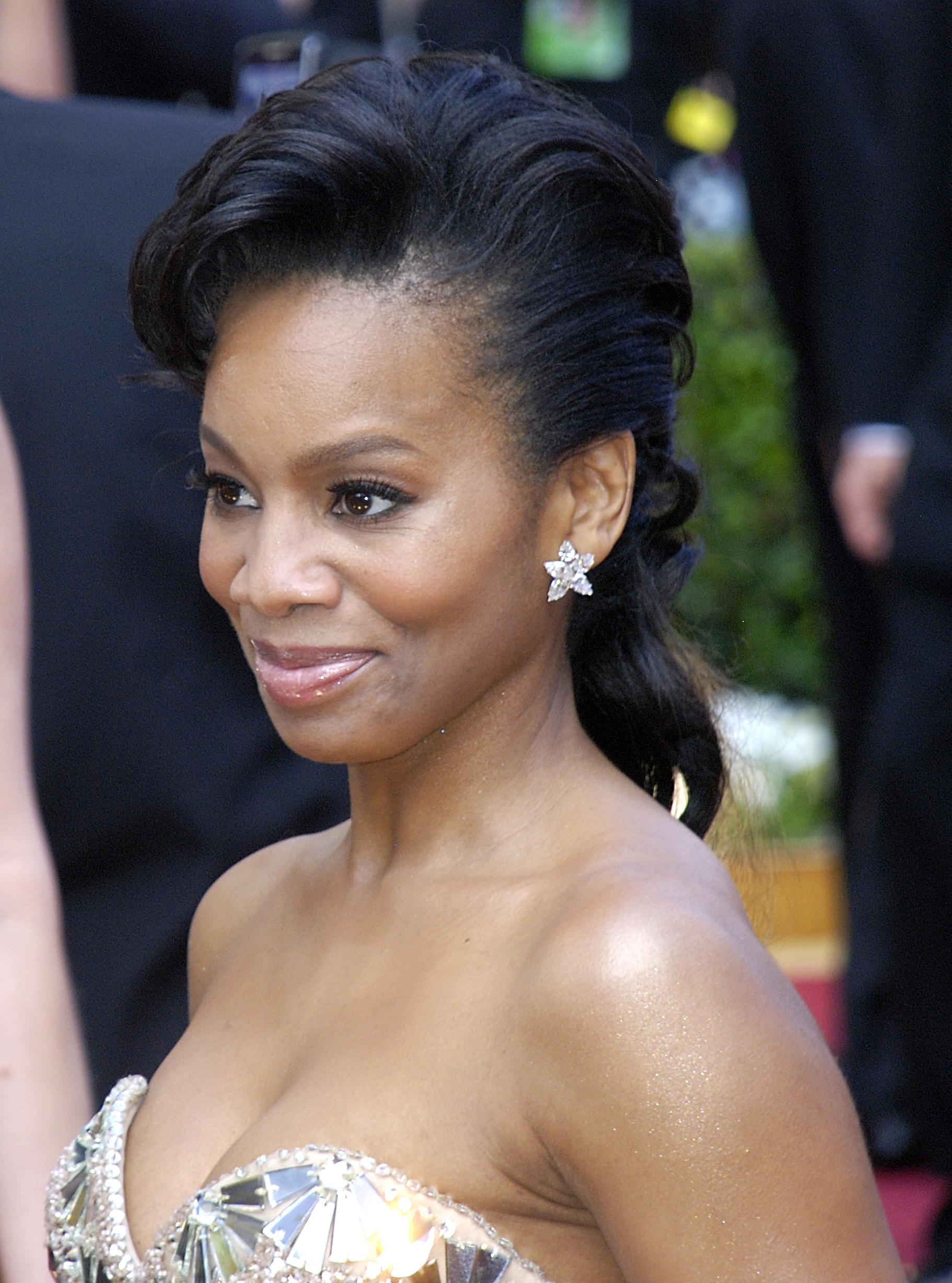
Anika Noni Rose voiced as Tiana in the film.

Tiana works two jobs in order to raise enough money to turn a rundown sugar mill into a restaurant, a promise she made to her father, who was killed in World War I. As a result, Tiana has become absorbed with her work and doesn't have time for anything else. Tiana finds hope when her wealthy childhood best friend Charlotte pays her a lump sum of money to make and serve beignets at a masquerade ball she is hosting for the handsome but disinherited Prince Naveen.

That night, Tiana's hopes are crushed when the realtors of the mill tell her that she was outbid by someone for the sugar mill and that it is probably a good thing given her 'background'. When Tiana accidentally ruins her costume, Charlotte is kind enough to replace it with one of her own. Out of desperation, Tiana wishes on a star, only to be greeted by a talking frog, who claims to be Prince Naveen. Mistaking her for a princess because of her costume, Naveen promises to give Tiana the money she needs if she turns him human again by kissing him. After some persuasion, Tiana succumbs, but becomes a frog instead.

While on the run from hungry alligators, Tiana strikes a deal with Naveen, demanding that once he marries Charlotte, he will use the money he gets from her to help Tiana buy the restaurant. Things change, however, on their journey to end the spell. They both meet a jazz-playing alligator named Louis and a Cajun firefly named Ray, who help them reach the voodoo priestess Mama Odie. Tiana and Naveen help each other escape from frog hunters and Tiana teaches Naveen to help her cook. As Ray sings an ode to his true love "Evangeline", Naveen shows Tiana how to dance, something that she has never done before because she was afraid to. Both frogs find themselves falling in love with one another, but are unsure how to say it.

Eventually Tiana comes face to face with Facilier himself, who promises to make her dream of "Tiana's Place" a reality if she hands over a voodoo charm which plays a significant role in his plans. After reminding her of all the work she has done and the people who held her back, he shows her an image of her late father, telling her that she can make sure the dream he never lived to see come true. Seeing her family together, Tiana finally realizes what her father had meant that he never got what he wanted but he had love, what he needed. Tiana is able to smash the charm and leaves Facilier at the mercy of the angry voodoo spirits.

Tiana finds Naveen, who is promising Charlotte that he will marry her but only if she will give Tiana her restaurant. Tiana stops him and finally admits that she loves him. Moved, Charlotte says she will kiss Naveen, "no marriage required", but it is already midnight and she is too late to break the spell. Tiana and Naveen get married in the bayou. Once they kiss, they finally become human again because Tiana is finally now a princess and is shown wearing her princess ball gown. Louis "terrifies" the realtors into accepting Tiana's offer. Together, Naveen and Tiana open the restaurant, now named "Tiana's Palace" and dance under the stars.

=== Theme parks ===
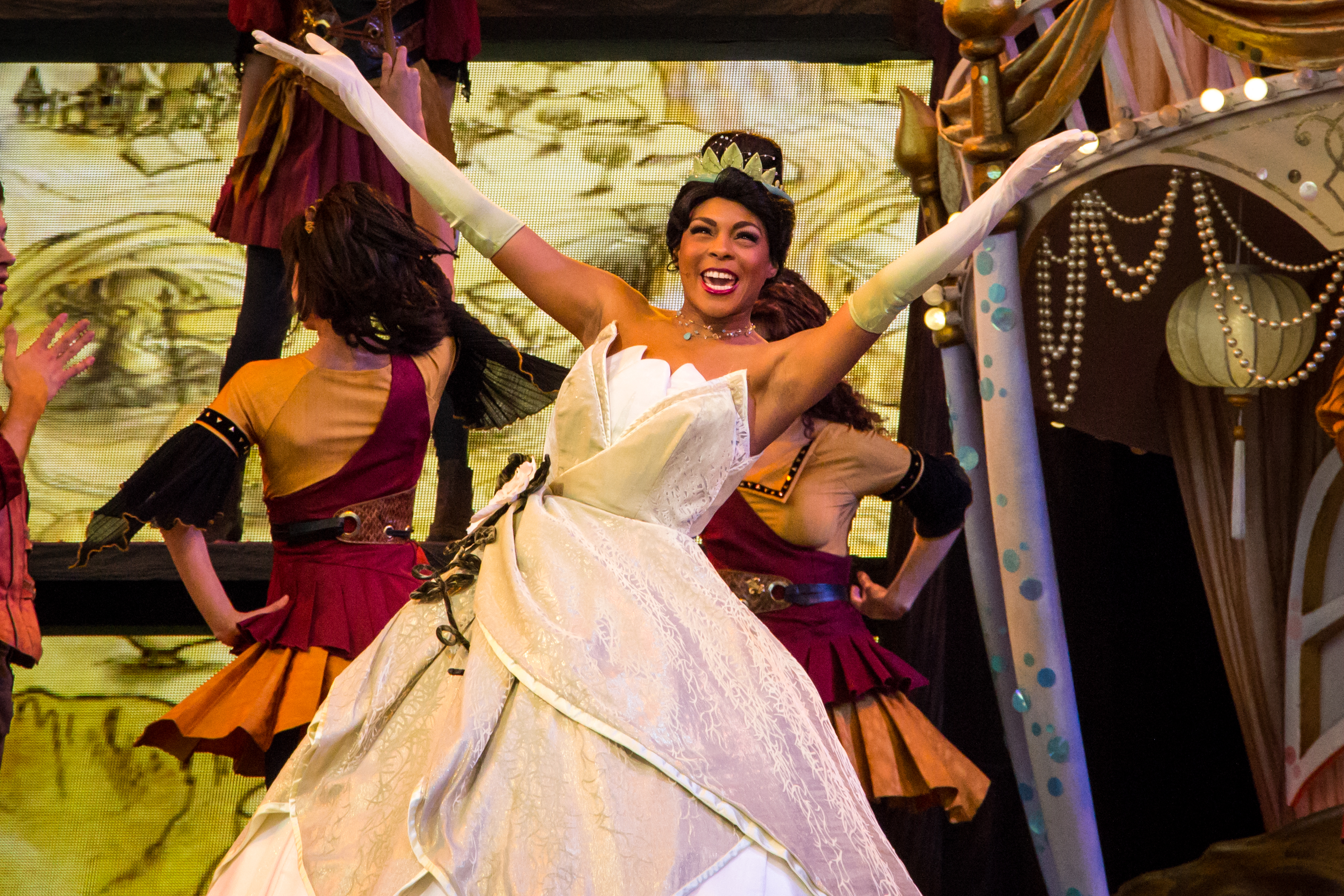
Tiana in Mickey and the Magical Map at Disneyland in 2014.

On October 26, 2009, "Tiana's Showboat Jubilee!" debuted with appearances from Tiana, Naveen, Louis, and Dr. Facilier, at the Walt Disney World Resort; and later at the Disneyland Resort. Tiana and Naveen are also in the "Festival of Fantasy Parade" at Magic Kingdom. Tiana, Naveen and Louis are also doing meet and greets at Walt Disney World's Liberty Square and in other parks in the Frontierland area aboard the riverboats. She joined Disney's "Once upon a Dream Parade" at Disneyland Paris in April 2010 as part of the "New Generations Festival". Tiana also joined Fantasmic! in early January 2010 during the finale with the Mark Twain Riverboat. Tiana, along with Naveen, Doctor Facilier, and Ray each make a cameo appearance in Disney's World of Color at Disney California Adventure. In Magic Kingdom Tiana and the other Disney Princesses can be found at Princess Fairytale Hall. When visiting Magic Kingdom visitors could originally find Princess Tiana under a gazebo at the edge of Liberty Square. Since June 2016, Tiana has been doing meet-and-greets at Princess Fairytale Hall.

In June 2020, it was announced that the Splash Mountain attraction at Disneyland and Magic Kingdom would be rethemed to The Princess and the Frog. The ride's storyline takes place after the events of the film, and involves Tiana hosting a Mardi Gras celebration. She realizes that due to a mix-up, her celebration is missing a band, so she travels to the bayou with Louis to search for musical critters. In June 2022, Anika Noni Rose mentioned during an interview on Live with Kelly and Ryan that she has been involved with discussions with Disney on what they want the attraction to be like. In July 2022 during the Essence Music Festival in New Orleans, Disney announced that the ride would be titled Tiana's Bayou Adventure, setting an opening date of "late 2024" at both parks. During the D23 Expo in September 2022, it was confirmed that Rose would be reprising her role of Tiana for the ride. Tiana's Bayou Adventure opened at Magic Kingdom in June 2024 and at Disneyland in November 2024.

In January 2023, it was announced that Disneyland would convert its French Market Restaurant in New Orleans Square into a Tiana's Palace restaurant. Tiana's Palace opened in September 2023.

=== Sofia the First ===
In 2014, Tiana made a guest appearance on Sofia the First in the episode "Winter's Gift", voiced again by Anika Noni Rose.

=== Once Upon a Time ===
A live-action character inspired by Tiana is a main character in the seventh season of Once Upon a Time, and she is played by Mekia Cox. In the New Enchanted Forest Tiana is the Queen of her kingdom, but then everyone in the realm is cursed and taken to a Land Without Magic. A new area of Seattle called Hyperion Heights is created and everyone including Tiana are sent there with new memories. Her new counterpart Sabine was a fast-food chef, but is now a food truck owner who sells beignets. Eventually, the Dark Curse is broken and Sabine regains her memories. In the series finale, Tiana is seen attending Regina Mills' coronation as the Queen of the newly United Realms.

=== Ralph Breaks the Internet ===
Tiana, alongside the other Disney Princesses, appeared in the film Ralph Breaks the Internet.

=== Lego Disney Princess specials ===
Tiana appears as one of the main characters in Lego's animated special Lego Disney Princess: The Castle Quest, released on Disney+ on August 18, 2023. She also appears in the 2025 sequel, Lego Disney Princess: Villains Unite.

== Reception and legacy ==
As a character, Tiana has been mostly positively received. Helen O'Hara of Empire wrote positively of the character, describing her as "a hard-headed heroine who works hard and displays a focus and drive". Catherine Shoard of The Guardian praised Tiana, congratulating Disney for creating "a heroine who's an actual character; a woman whose three dimensions you don't need to don daft specs to see." Betsy Sharley of The Los Angeles Times wrote positively of Tiana, describing her as both "beautiful" and "boisterous". Carey Bryson of About.com gave Tiana high praise, calling her both "a fabulous new princess" and "a decent role model". In 2022, Matthew Stewart and Paul Sheehan of Gold Derby ranked Tiana as the fifth best Disney Princess writing, "No matter how humble her beginnings or what setbacks she experiences, Tiana never stops working as hard as she can toward her goal of becoming a successful restaurateur. She does, of course, come to a point of frustration when it seems as though her frog transformation will never wear off, but the way she bounces back only adds to her positive characterization."

Tiana is notable for being Disney's first black princess. The studio's decision to create a black heroine was met with mixed reception. While some critics, such as Richard Watson, praised the film for offering a long-awaited "break in tradition", others received it with much criticism and speculation. Rachel Bertsche of O, The Oprah Magazine called the arrival of a black Disney princess "barrier-breaking" and "long overdue". Peter Bradshaw of The Guardian wrote, "these avowedly black people spend an awful lot of the movie being adorable, unthreatening little green creatures. Disney may wish to reach out to people of colour – but the colour green wasn't what we had in mind." Bidisha of The Observer was fairly mixed in her review, calling Tiana a "one-dimensional" but "clever, strong woman", while criticizing the film's light-hearted plot and lack of emphasis on racial issues. Patricia Williams of The Guardian, who conceded harboring a general dislike of Disney animated films and the characters featured in them, including the princesses, accused Disney of being "unforgivably late" in their creation of a black heroine. Williams did, however, find Tiana to be "spunkier than most princesses", comparing her to Princess Fiona of the Shrek franchise, and reacted positively to Tiana's portrayal as a tireless feminist restaurant tycoon. Writer Brooks Barnes from The New York Times highlights the two different issues for Princess Tiana, in her article "Her Prince Has Come. Critics, Too" that shows Disney with a good standing than with a negative standpoint, with the help of other writers expressing how, "Disney should be ashamed", said William Blackburn, a former columnist at The Charlotte Observer. "This princess story is set in New Orleans, the setting of one of the most devastating tragedies to beset a black community." Harvard teacher Michael D. Baran, a cognitive psychologist and anthropologist, expressed how children learn about race, and how Disney has a stereotyping history, "Because of Disney's history of stereotyping, people are really excited to see how Disney will handle her language, her culture, her physical attributes" said Michael D. Baran.

On August 19, 2011, Anika Noni Rose was presented with a Disney Legends award at the D23 Expo in Anaheim, California, to commemorate her work on The Princess and the Frog. At the same ceremony, actresses Jodi Benson, Paige O'Hara, Linda Larkin, and Lea Salonga were also honored with awards for their individual contributions to Disney, having each at some point loaned their voice to a Disney princess.

On March 12, 2012, Sociological Images published a post arguing that using the Disney character Tiana to advertise watermelon candy perpetrated the racist watermelon stereotype. This criticism was reported on some other blogs.

Upon the releases of the trailers on Ralph Breaks the Internet, in which Tiana and the other Disney Princesses would appear, there was criticism regarding Tiana's appearance changed with a lighter skin tone, a narrower nose, and European features compared to her actual appearance in The Princess and the Frog. In response to this controversy, Disney invited Tiana's voice actress Anika Noni Rose and the advocacy group Color of Change at Walt Disney Animation Studios to redesign Tiana's appearance in Ralph Breaks the Internet to make sure she resembles more closely to her actual appearance in The Princess and the Frog; the updated character model was revealed in the second trailer.

In December 2020, it was announced that Tiana would have a self-titled spin-off TV series debuting on Disney+. In March 2025, it was announced that the project was shelved. The Hollywood Reporter noted; "Sources close to the streaming series say that despite best efforts, including several changes to the creative team, Tiana ultimately could not get to where it needed to be given production costs."
