= European dragon =

Mythical creature in European folklore

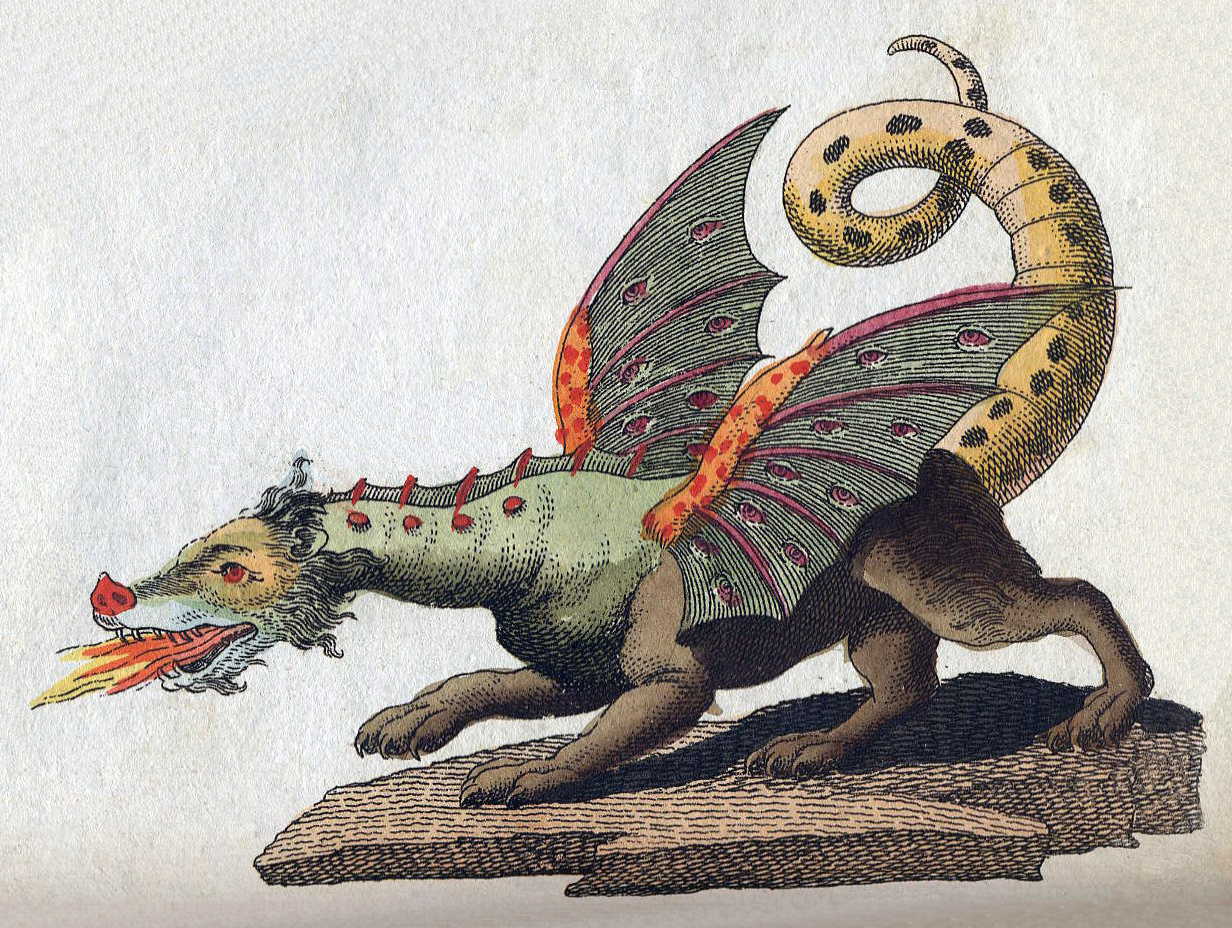
- Illustration of a winged dragon by Friedrich Justin Bertuch, 1806.

Creature information
- Grouping: Legendary creature
- Sub grouping: Dragon
- Similar entities: Other dragons
- Folklore: Medieval folklore

Origin
- Region: Europe and the Mediterranean region
- Habitat: Lairs, caves, castles, mountains

The European dragon is a legendary creature in folklore and mythology among the overlapping cultures of Europe.

The Roman poet Virgil in his poem Culex lines 163–201, describing a shepherd battling a big constricting snake, calls it "serpens" and also "draco", showing that in his time the two words probably could mean the same thing.

In and after the Early Middle Ages, the European dragon is typically depicted as a large, fire-breathing, scaly, horned, lizard-like creature; the creature also has leathery, bat-like wings, and a long, muscular prehensile tail. Some depictions show dragons with one or more of: feathered wings, crests, ear frills, fiery manes, ivory spikes running down its spine, and various exotic decorations.

In folktales, dragon's blood often contains unique powers, keeping them alive for longer or giving them poisonous or acidic properties. The typical dragon in Christian culture protects a cavern or castle filled with gold and treasure. An evil dragon is often associated with a great hero who tries to slay it, and a good one is said to give support or wise advice.

Though a winged creature, the dragon is generally to be found in its underground lair, a cave. Dragons have been mentioned in European literature since antiquity. In some accounts, the hero Sigurð defeats Fáfnir by digging a pit and then lying in wait, piercing his heart with a sword as he passes overhead and slaying him. This concept is also seen in various other dragon stories. In many portrayals of the European dragon, it is shown as a greedy beast who wanted wealth and other valuables. This includes the prominent dragons in Germanic mythology, Fáfnir and the killer of Beowulf.

== Etymology ==
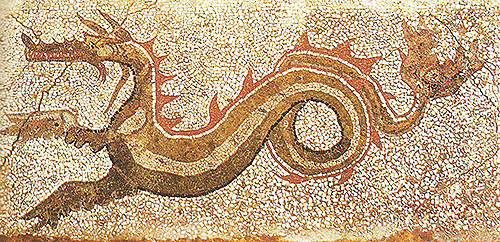
Mosaic of the third century BC from Kaulonia, southern Italy.

== Classical period ==
The Dacian Draco.

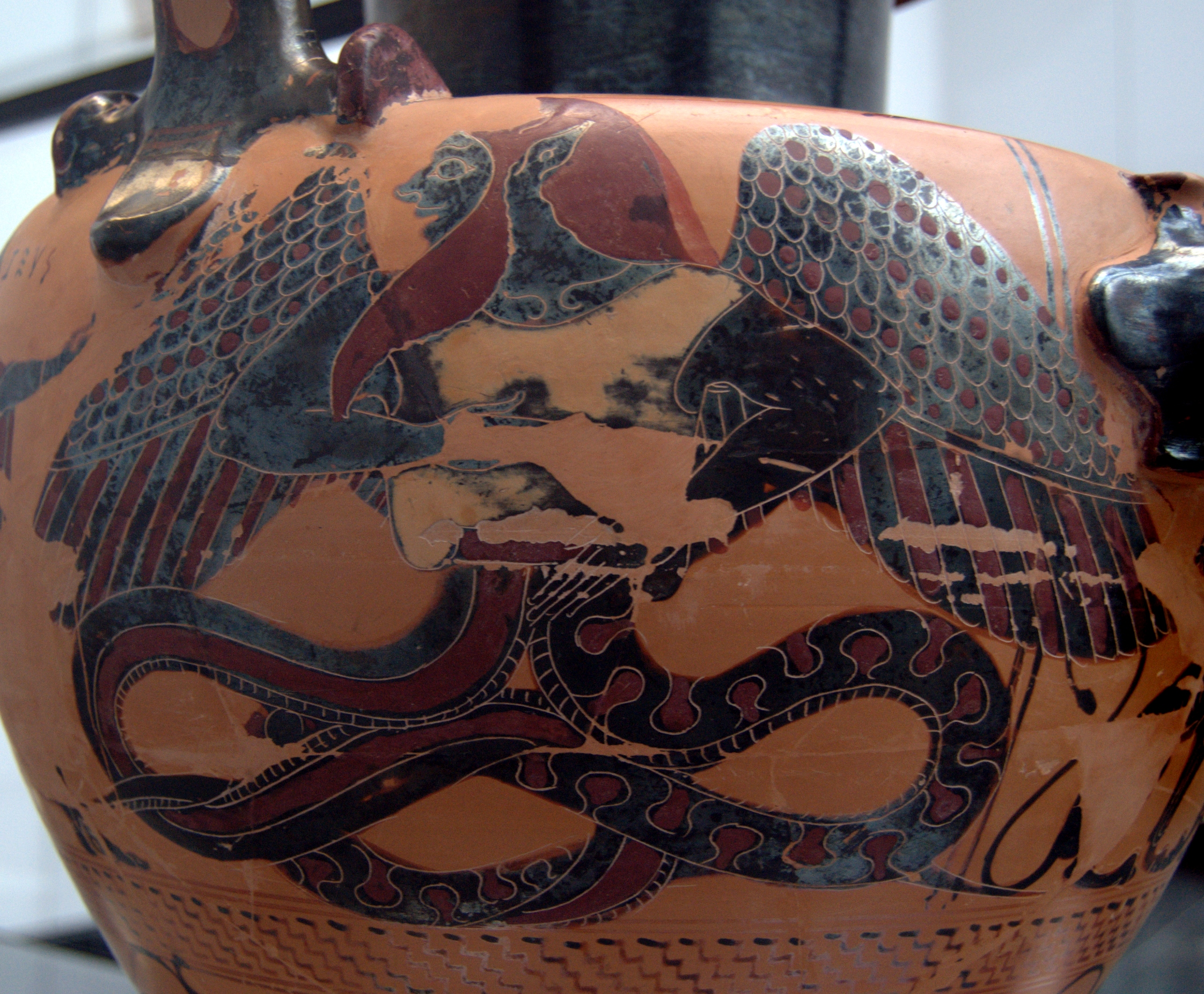
Zeus aiming his thunderbolt at a winged and snake-footed Typhon. Chalcidian black-figured hydria (c. 540–530 BC), Staatliche Antikensammlungen (Inv. 596)

Roman dragons developed from serpentine Greek ones, combined with the dragons of the Near East, in the context of the hybrid Greek/Eastern Hellenistic culture. From Babylon, the muš-ḫuššu was a classic representation of a Near Eastern dragon. St John's Book of Revelation – Greek text, not Latin – describes Satan as "a great dragon, flaming red, with seven heads and ten horns". Much of St John's literary inspiration is late Hebrew and Greek, but his dragon is more likely to have symbolized the dragons from the Near East. In the Roman Empire, each military cohort had a particular identifying signum (military standard); after the Parthian and Dacian Wars of Trajan in the east, the Dacian Draco military standard entered the Legion with the Cohors Sarmatarum and Cohors Dacorum (Sarmatian and Dacian cohorts) – a large dragon fixed to the end of a lance, with large, gaping jaws of silver and with the rest of the body formed of colored silk. With the jaws facing into the wind, the silken body inflated and rippled, resembling a windsock.

Several personifications of evil or allusions to dragons in the Old Testament are translated as forms of draco in Jerome's Vulgate. e.g. Deuteronomy (32:33), Job (30:29), Psalms (73:13, 90:13 & 43:20), Isaiah (13:21, 27:1, 34:13 & 43:20), Jeremiah (9:11), and Malachi (1:3).

Dragons in Greek mythology often guard treasure. For example, Ladon, a hundred-headed dragon, guarded the tree of Hesperides until he was slain by Heracles. Likewise, Python guarded the oracle of Delphi until he was slain by Apollo out of revenge for Python tormenting his mother. The Lernaean Hydra, a multiple-headed serpentine swamp monster killed by Heracles, is said to be a dragon.

Typhon was the dragon par excellence of the Greek world. He was the parent of all monsters and represented the opposition par excellence to the gods. Typhon was described and represented as a snake-like creature with bat-like wings and who breathed fire from several snake-like mouths that branched off from his limbs.

In a tale in Apuleius's The Golden Ass (also called Metamorphoses of Apuleius) a band of travelers ask a shepherd for refreshments. The shepherd asks why they care about refreshments in such a place. An old man asks the travelers if they can help get his son from a well; one of them goes to help. When he does not return to the group, they go search for him. They find a monstrous dragon eating the said man from the group while the old man was nowhere to be seen.

The Roman author Pliny the Elder describes the Indian drakōn as a big constricting snake, likely the Indian Python, but described exaggeratedly as able to kill an elephant by constricting its neck.

The Roman author Claudius Aelianus describes the draco as a big constricting snake found in India, presumably the Indian Python, but with its size and strength greatly exaggerated so that it can kill an elephant by constricting its neck; this battle between a draco and an elephant is repeated with much embellishment in later descriptions of dracones or dragons in bestiaries.

== Middle Ages ==
=== Depiction ===
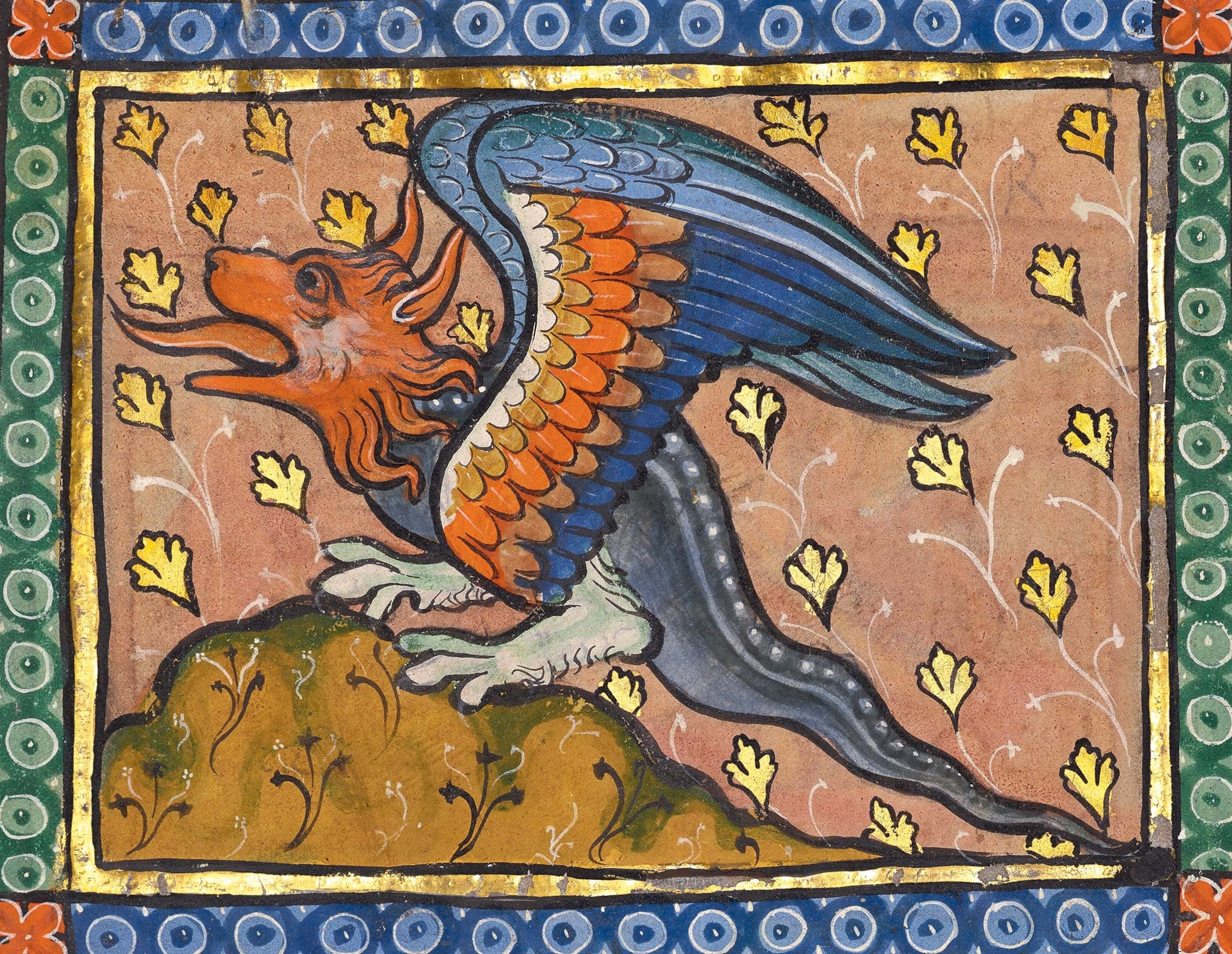
Miniature from a 13th-century Franco-Flemish bestiary by Hugues de Fouilloy showing a ferocious dragon with feathered, birdlike wings, a mane, and a serpentine tongue, ca.1270.

During the early Middle Ages, European culture was largely out of contact with classical literature for centuries. During this time there was a gradual change in the usual mental image of the "dragon", i.e. the Latin draco and its equivalents in vernacular languages, which occurred in oral and written literature, including in classical literature. This led to the depiction in this literature of "modern-type" dragons, whose features are described below.

The modern Western image of a dragon developed in western Europe during the Middle Ages through the combination of the snakelike dragons of classical Graeco-Roman literature, references to Near Eastern dragons preserved in the Bible, and European folk traditions including descriptions and drawings of animals named as types of snakes but inaccurately drawn with wings or legs. The period between the 11th and 13th centuries represents the height of European interest in dragons as living creatures.

Dragons are usually shown in modern times with a body more like a huge lizard, or a snake with two pairs of lizard-type legs, and breathing fire from their mouths. This traces back to the continental dragon, commonly referred to as a fire-breathing dragon. The continental, like many other European dragons, has bat-like wings growing from its back.

The Anglo-Saxon poem Beowulf refers to a dragon as a draca and also as a wyrm (worm, or serpent). Its movements are denoted by the Anglo-Saxon verb bugan, "to bend", and it is said to have a venomous bite, and poisonous breath; all of these indicate a snake-like form and movement rather than with a lizard-like or dinosaur-like body as in later depictions, and no legs or wings are mentioned (although it is able to fly); however it shows several dragon features that later became popular: it breathed fire, flew, lived underground, and collected treasure.

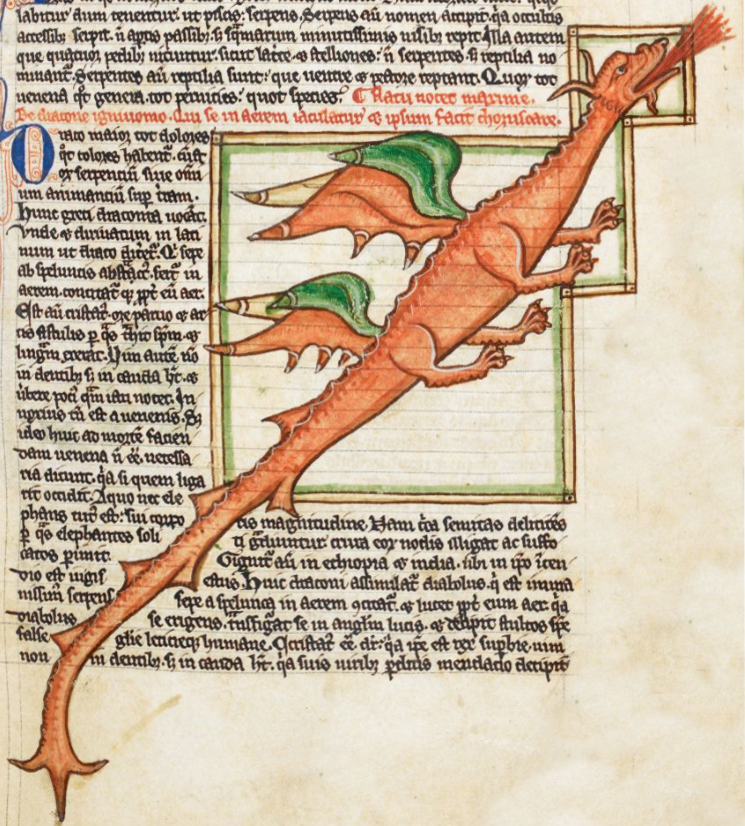
MS Harley 3244, a medieval bestiary dated to around 1260 AD, contains the oldest recognizable image of a fully modern, Western dragon.

An early image of a "modern-style" Western dragon appears in an illustration in the bestiary MS Harley 3244 from about 1260. It has two pairs of wings and two pairs of legs to go with them, and a tail longer than most modern depictions of dragons, but it clearly displays many of the same distinctive features. Otherwise four-legged dragons are not seen until the fifteenth century, for instance in Lambeth Palace Library MS 6, depicting the fight between a white and a red dragon from Arthurian legend.

Dragons are generally depicted as having an underground lair or cave, or living in rivers. They are envisioned as greedy and gluttonous, with voracious appetites. Dragons are often identified with Satan, due to the references to Satan as a "dragon" in the Book of Revelation.

In European folklore, dragon-like creatures and dragons in Christian literature are usually portrayed as evil, except mainly in Asturian and Welsh folklore and modern fiction. In the modern period and late medieval times, the European dragon is typically depicted as a huge fire-breathing, scaly, and horned lizard-like creature, with wings (usually leathery bat-like, sometimes feathered), two or four legs, and a long muscular tail. It is sometimes shown with one or more of a crest, a fiery mane, ivory spikes running down its spine, and various exotic colourations. Dragon's blood often has magical properties. The typical dragon protects a cavern or castle filled with gold and treasure and is often associated with a great hero who tries to slay it. Though a winged creature, the dragon is generally to be found in its underground lair, a cave that identifies it as an ancient creature of earth.

=== Legends and tales ===
The 12th-century Welsh monk Geoffrey of Monmouth recounts a famous legend in his Historia Regum Britanniae in which the child prophet Merlin witnesses the Romano-Celtic warlord Vortigern attempting to build a tower on Mount Snowdon to keep safe from the Anglo-Saxons, but the tower keeps being swallowed into the ground. Merlin informs Vortigern that underneath the foundation he has built is a pool with two dragons sleeping in it. Vortigern orders the pool to be drained, exposing a red dragon and a white dragon, who immediately begin fighting. Merlin delivers a prophecy that the white dragon will triumph over the red, symbolizing England's conquest of Wales, but declares that the red dragon will eventually return and defeat the white one. This story remained popular throughout the 15th century.

The 13th-century Golden Legend, written in Latin, records the story of Saint Margaret of Antioch, a virgin martyr who, after being tortured for her faith in the Diocletianic Persecution and thrown back into her cell, is said to have been confronted by a monstrous dragon, but she made the sign of the cross and the dragon vanished. In some versions of the story, she is swallowed by the dragon alive and, after making the sign of the cross in the dragon's stomach, emerges unharmed - or in another version, after a physical cross she carried irritated the dragon's innards.

Fantastic stories were invented in the Middle Ages to explain gargoyles used as waterspouts on buildings. One medieval French legend holds that, in ancient times, a fearsome dragon known as La Gargouille had been causing floods and sinking ships on the river Seine, so the people of the town of Rouen would offer the dragon a human sacrifice once each year to appease its hunger. Then, in around 600 AD, a priest named Romanus promised that, if the people would build a church, he would rid them of the dragon. Romanus slew the dragon and its severed head was mounted on the walls of the city as the first gargoyle.

==== St George and the Dragon ====
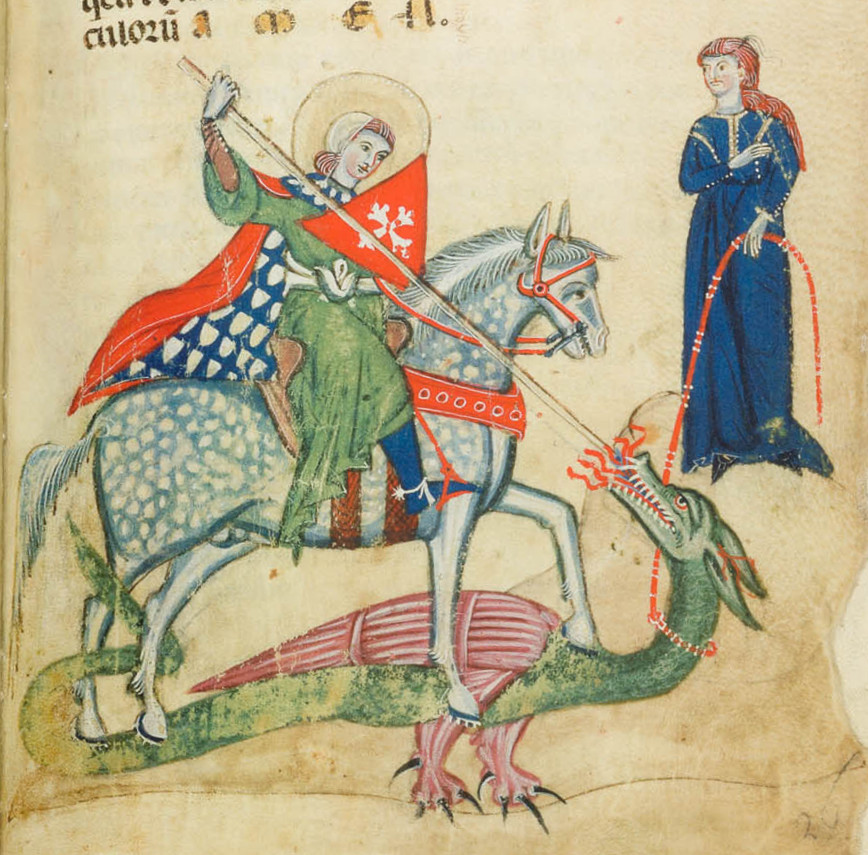
Manuscript illustration from Verona of Saint George slaying the dragon, (northern Italy) dating to c. 1270

The legend of Saint George and the Dragon is recorded as early as the sixth century AD, but the earliest artistic representations of it come from the 11th century and the first full account of it comes from an 11th-century Georgian text. The most famous version of the story from the Golden Legend holds that a dragon kept pillaging the sheep of the town of Silene in Libya. After it ate a young shepherd, the people were forced to placate it by leaving two sheep as sacrificial offerings every morning beside the lake where the dragon lived. Eventually, the dragon ate all of the sheep and the people were forced to start offering it their own children. One day, the king's own daughter came up in the lottery and, despite the king's pleas for her life, she was dressed as a bride and chained to a rock beside the lake to be eaten. Then Saint George arrived and saw the princess. When the dragon arrived to eat her, he stabbed it with his lance and subdued it by making the sign of the cross and tying the princess's girdle around its neck. Saint George and the princess led the now docile dragon into the town and George promised to kill it if the townspeople would convert to Christianity. All the townspeople converted and Saint George killed the dragon with his sword. In some versions, Saint George marries the princess, but, in others, he continues wandering.

=== Heraldry ===
Dragons are prominent in medieval heraldry. Uther Pendragon was famously said to have had two gold dragons crowned with red standing back-to-back on his royal coat of arms. Originally, heraldic dragons could have any number of legs, but, by the late Middle Ages, due to the widespread proliferation of bestiaries, heraldry began to distinguish between a "dragon" (with four legs) and a "wyvern" (with two legs). In myths, wyverns are associated with viciousness, envy, and pestilence, but in heraldry, they symbolise the overthrowing of the tyranny of Satan and his demonic forces. Late medieval heraldry also distinguished a dragon-like creature known as a "cockatrice". A cockatrice is supposedly born when a serpent hatches an egg that has been laid on a dunghill by a rooster, and it is so venomous that its breath and its gaze are both lethal to any living creature, except for a weasel, which is the cockatrice's mortal enemy. A "basilisk" is a serpent with the head of a dragon at the end of its tail that is born when a toad hatches an egg that has been laid in a midden by a nine-year-old cockatrice. Like the cockatrice, its glare is said to be deadly.

== Dragons in specific cultures ==
=== Celtic ===
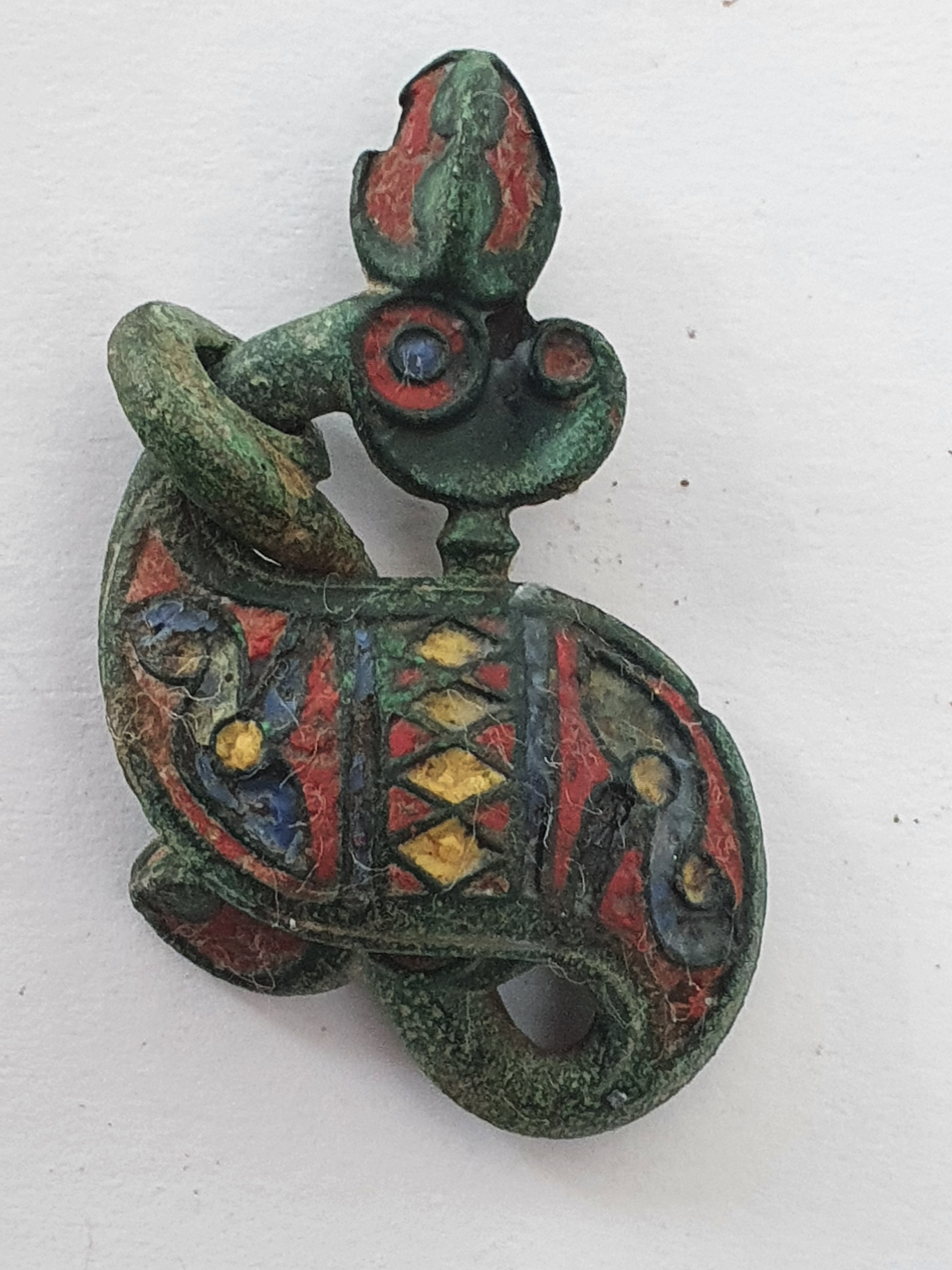
Dragonesque brooch, AD 75 – 175

The Celtic dragon may have developed from a horned and poisonous or fire-breathing snake. It is mostly a snake that is transformed into a monster.

The dragon motif is known in Celtic art in diverse styles, and is presumed to have derived from a serpent-like creature in ancient folklore of the Middle East and Greece. Both the Greeks and the Romans considered the serpent to be a guardian spirit, represented on their altars. Western Celtic peoples were familiar with dragons in the pre-Christian age, and native people of Britain are said to have worn Celtic decorations with motifs of dragons on them during the Roman invasion. There is also archaeological evidence that the continental Celts used brooches and pins in the form of a dragon during the La Téne period from c. 500 BC to 1 AD. Some suggest that the native Britons of Europe may have brought the dragon with them when they migrated to Britain before the Roman age. The earliest known use of the dragon by the Celts appears in swords and sheaths in the 4th century BC. One example found in Britain is an early Iron Age Celtic sword that features two opposing dragons, queried to be from the Hallstatt culture. Two other swords and scabbards (also from the bottom of the river Thames) are thought to include a dragon pair from the La Tène or Hallstatt cultures. Discovery of Celtic dragon-pairs in the Thames suggests that links existed between Britain and the rest of the Celtic world in the decades around 300 BC. Evidence in coins also shows Celticised dragons in 50–45 BC.

=== Germanic ===
Dragons, or worms, are prevalent in early Germanic folklore and art, with notable examples being the killer of Beowulf, the central figure of the Völsung Cycle Fáfnir and Jǫrmungandr. In this cultural context, the distinction between snakes and dragons is blurred with both being referred to by the same terms, including Old Norse: ormr and Old English: wyrm. Other terms often used are the cognates Old Norse: dreki and Old English: draca meaning "dragon, sea serpent or sea monster" which are derived from Proto-Germanic *drakō, an early borrowing from Latin draco "huge serpent or dragon". These terms are sometimes used interchangeably with Old Norse: ormr and Old English: wyrm, although sometimes they are treated as different beings. While in later accounts many dragons are portrayed in these cultures as being winged, this is likely under influence from Southern Europe. In later Northern European folklore, many worms are found that are flightless and resemble large snakes such as the Lambton Worm and the Stoor worm.

While depictions are diverse, several traits are shared amongst many worms, including hoarding gold, and spitting atter and later fire. Depictions of worms are prevalent in early medieval art, notably on runestones, where they often form the band on which the runes are written. Specific worms are also depicted, such as Jǫrmungandr on the Altuna stone and Fáfnir on the Jurby cross, the Hylestad Stave Church and the Ramsund carving.

=== Welsh ===
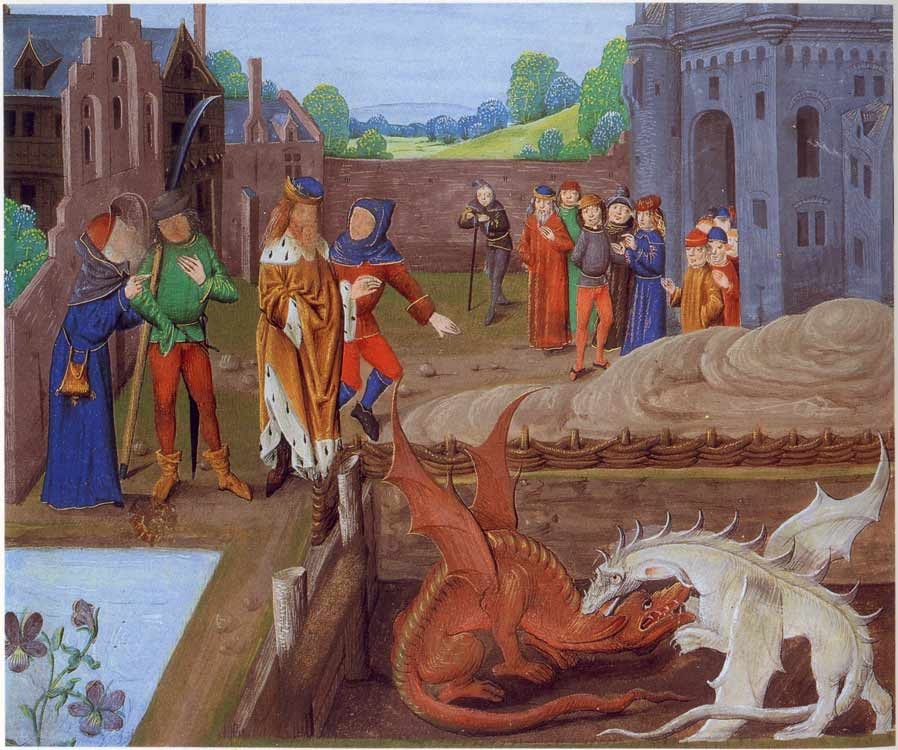
Fifteenth-century manuscript illustration of the battle of the Red and White Dragons from Geoffrey of Monmouth's History of the Kings of Britain

The red dragon features on, and is the name of, the national flag of Wales (Y Ddraig Goch, "the red dragon"). Early Welsh writing associates dragons with war leaders, and in legend, Nennius, in Historia Birttonum, tells of a vision of the red dragon (representing the Britons) and the white dragon (representing the invading Saxons) fighting beneath Dinas Emrys. A version of this particular legend also features in the Mabinogion in the story of Lludd and Llefelys.

=== Slavic ===
==== Alas ====
It is said that a very old snake can transform into an ala. Some depictions of alas are confusingly said to have the bodies of women. Other alas look like dragons. The number of heads on an ala may vary. Alas are enemies of the zmeys and it is sometimes said in south Slavic folklore that thunder is a product of alas and zmeys fighting. Alas are considered evil or malevolent, while zmeys are usually considered good or benevolent.

==== Zmeys ====
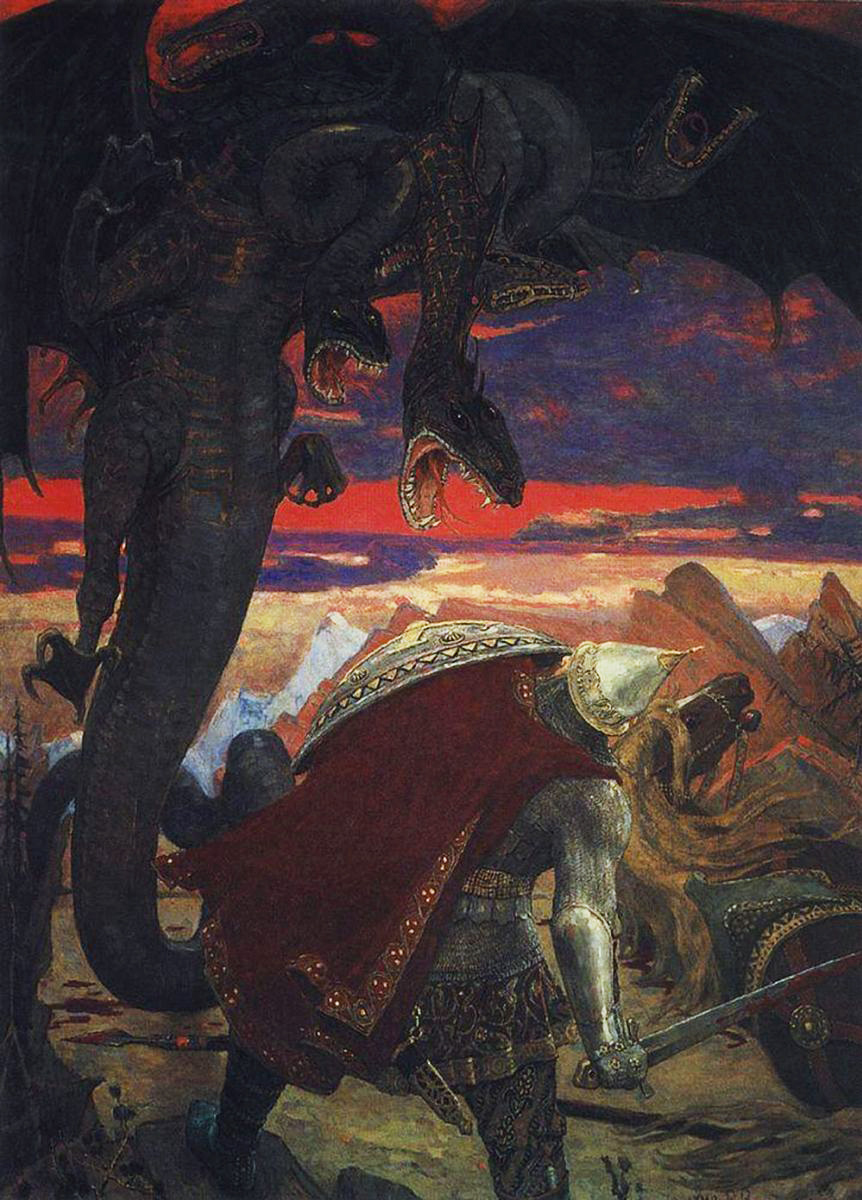
Zmey Gorynych, by Victor Vasnetsov

Dragon-like creatures of Slavic mythology hold mixed temperaments towards humans. For example, Drakons in Bulgarian mythology are either male or female, and each gender has a different view of mankind. The female dragon and male dragon, often seen as sister and brother, represent different forces of agriculture. The female dragon represents harsh weather and is the destroyer of crops, the hater of mankind, and is locked in a never-ending battle with her brother. The male dragon protects the humans' crops from destruction and is generally benevolent to humanity. Fire and water play major roles in Bulgarian dragon lore: the female has water characteristics, while the male is usually a fiery creature. In Bulgarian legend, The drakons are three-headed, winged beings with snake's bodies.

In slavic lore, the dragon-like creature or zmey is generally an evil, four-legged beast with few, if any, redeeming qualities. Zmeys are intelligent, but not greatly so, often demanding tribute from villages or small towns in the form of maidens (for food), or gold. Their number of heads ranges from one to seven or sometimes even more, with three- and seven-headed Zmeys being most commonly cited. The heads also regrow if cut off, unless the neck is "treated" with fire (similar to the hydra in Greek mythology). Zmey blood is said to be so poisonous that the Earth itself will refuse to absorb it. In Bulgarian mythology these "dragons" are sometimes good, opposing the evil Lamya /ламя/, a beast similar to the zmey.

==== Smok ====
The most famous Polish dragon (Polish: Smok) is the Wawel Dragon or Smok Wawelski, the Dragon of Wawel Hill. It supposedly terrorized ancient Kraków and lived in caves on the Vistula river bank below the Wawel castle. According to lore based on the Book of Daniel, it was killed by a boy who offered it a sheepskin filled with sulphur and tar. After devouring it, the dragon became so thirsty that it finally exploded after drinking too much water. In the oldest, 12th-century version of this fantasy tale, written by Wincenty Kadłubek, the dragon was defeated by two sons of a King Krak, Krakus II and Lech II. A metal sculpture of the Wawel Dragon is a well-known tourist sight in Kraków. The Wawel Dragon appears in the coat of arms of the Polish princes, the Piasts of Czersk.

=== Armenian ===
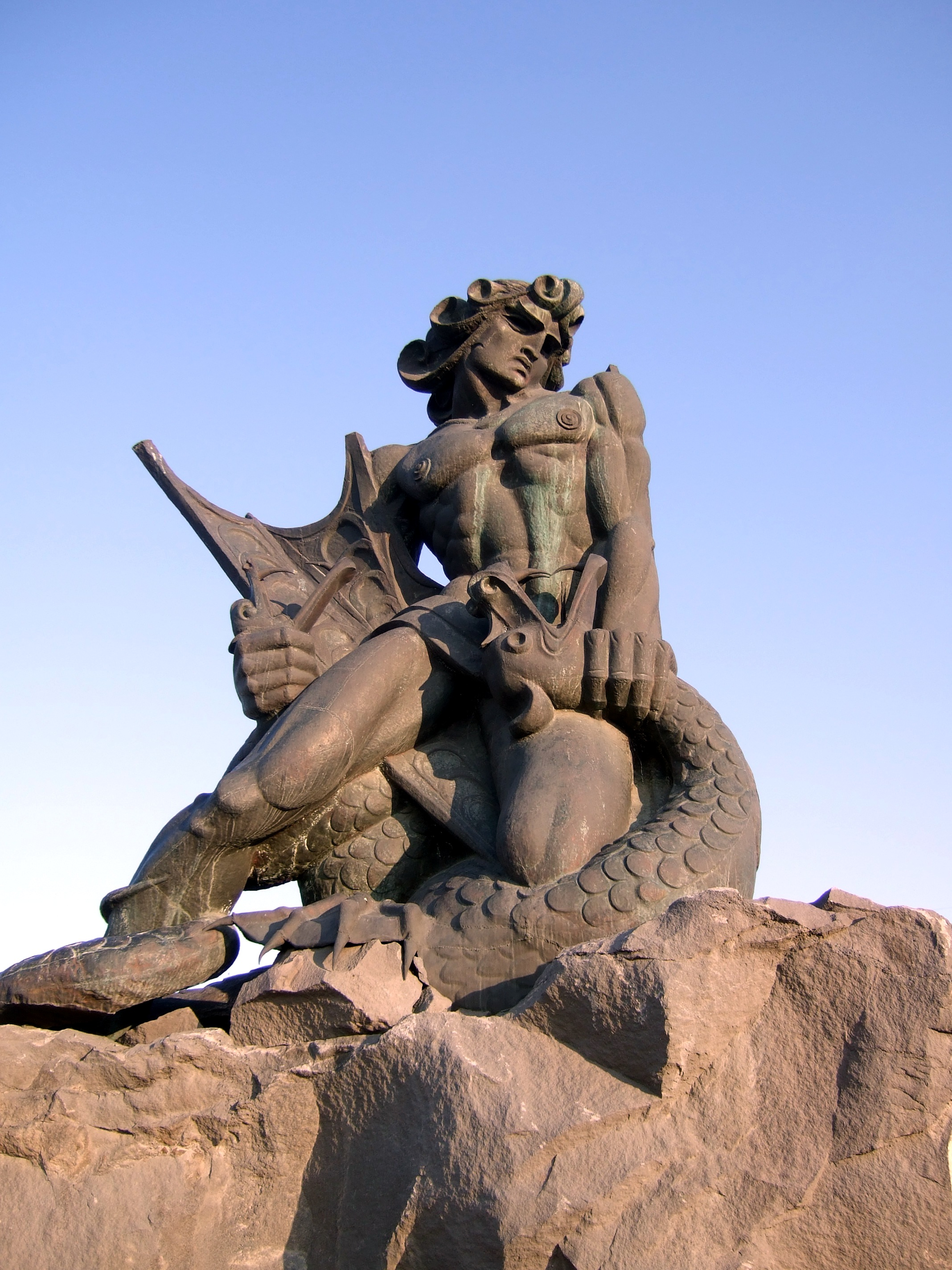
Statue of the Armenian god Vahagn the Dragon Slayer choking a dragon in Yerevan, Armenia

Վիշապ (Vishap) is the Armenian word for "dragon".

=== Iberian ===
Iberian dragons are almost always evil, such as the Cuélebre, or Cuelebre, a giant winged serpent in the mythology of Asturias and Cantabria in the north of Spain. It usually lives in a cave, guards treasures and keeps nymph-like beings called xanas or anjanas as prisoners.

There is a legend that a dragon dwelled in the Peña Uruel mountain near Jaca and claimed that it could mesmerise people with its glance, so the young man who decided to kill the beast equipped himself with a shiny shield, so that the dragon's glance would be reflected. When the young man arrived at the cave where the dragon lived, he could kill it easily because the dragon mesmerised itself. This legend is very similar to the Greek myth of Medusa.

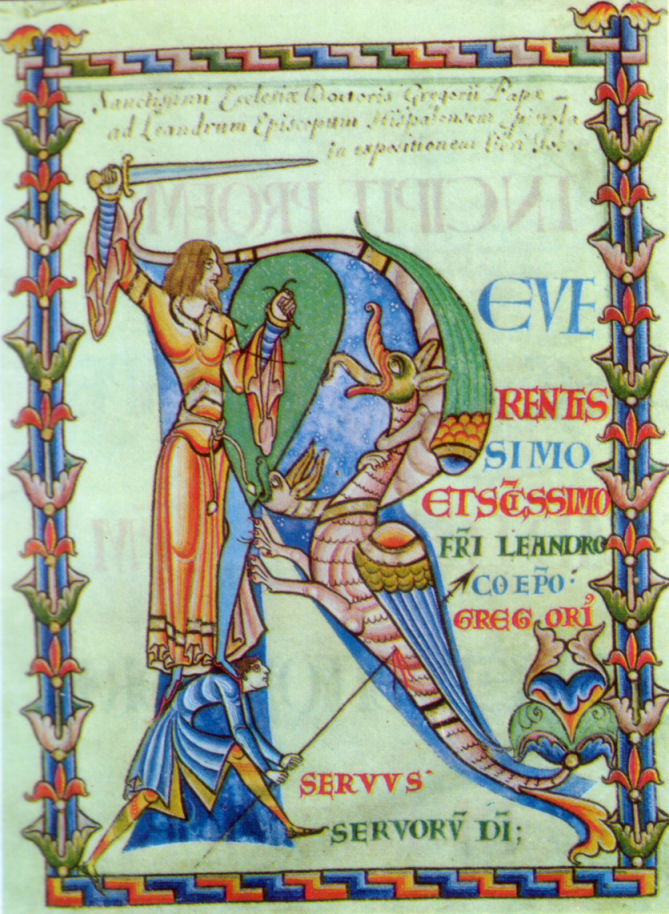
Illumination in a 12th-century manuscript of a letter from Saint Gregory's to St. Leander (Bibl. Municipale, MS 2, Dijon)

Herensuge is the name given to the dragon in Basque mythology, meaning "last serpent". The most famous legend has St. Michael descend from Heaven to kill it, but only once did God agree to accompany him in person.

Sugaar, the Basque male god, is often associated with the serpent or dragon but can take other forms as well. His name can be read as "male serpent".

Dragons are well known in Catalan myths and legends, in no small part because St. George (Catalan Sant Jordi) is the patron saint of Catalonia. Like most mythical reptiles, the Catalan dragon (Catalan drac) is an enormous serpent-like creature with four legs and a pair of wings, or rarely, a two-legged creature with a pair of wings, called a wyvern. As in many other parts of the world, the dragon's face may be like that of some other animal, such as a lion or a bull. As is common elsewhere, Catalan dragons are fire-breathers, and the dragon-fire is all-consuming. Catalan dragons also can emit a fetid odor, which can rot away anything it touches.

The Catalans also distinguish a víbria or vibra (cognate with English viper and wyvern), a female dragon-like creature with two prominent breasts, two claws, two wings and an eagle's beak. Dracs, Víbries and other mythological figures used to participate in correfocs during popular celebrations.

In Portuguese mythology, Coca is a female wyvern that battles Saint George on the Corpus Christi holiday. The fighting has a symbolic meaning: when the coca defeats Saint George the crops will be bad and there will be famine and death; when Saint George defeats the coca and cuts off her tongue and ears, the crops will have a good year and it announces prosperity. Still, she is called "saint" coca just as George is called saint, and the people cheer for her.

Another dragon called drago is also represented in Portuguese mythology and used to take part in celebrations during the Middle Ages.

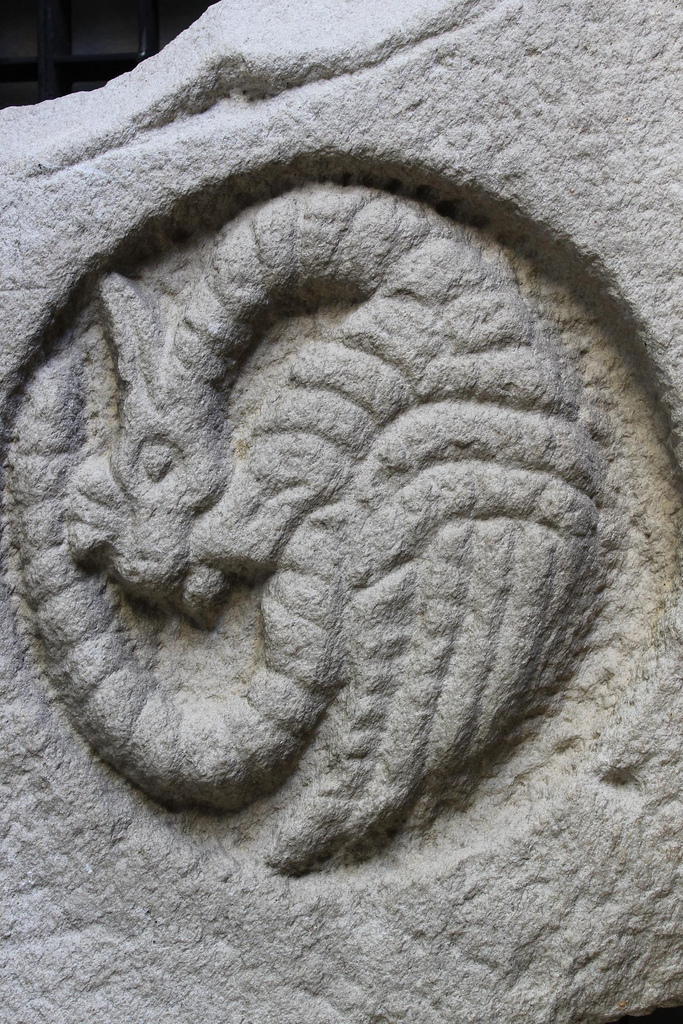
Dragon in a granite Relief (14th century). San Anton Museum (A Coruña, Galicia).

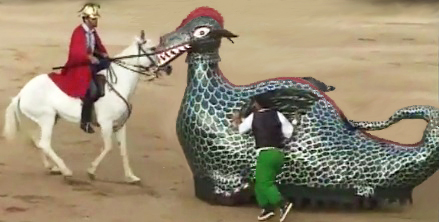
"Festa da Coca" during the Corpus Christi celebration, in Monção, Portugal

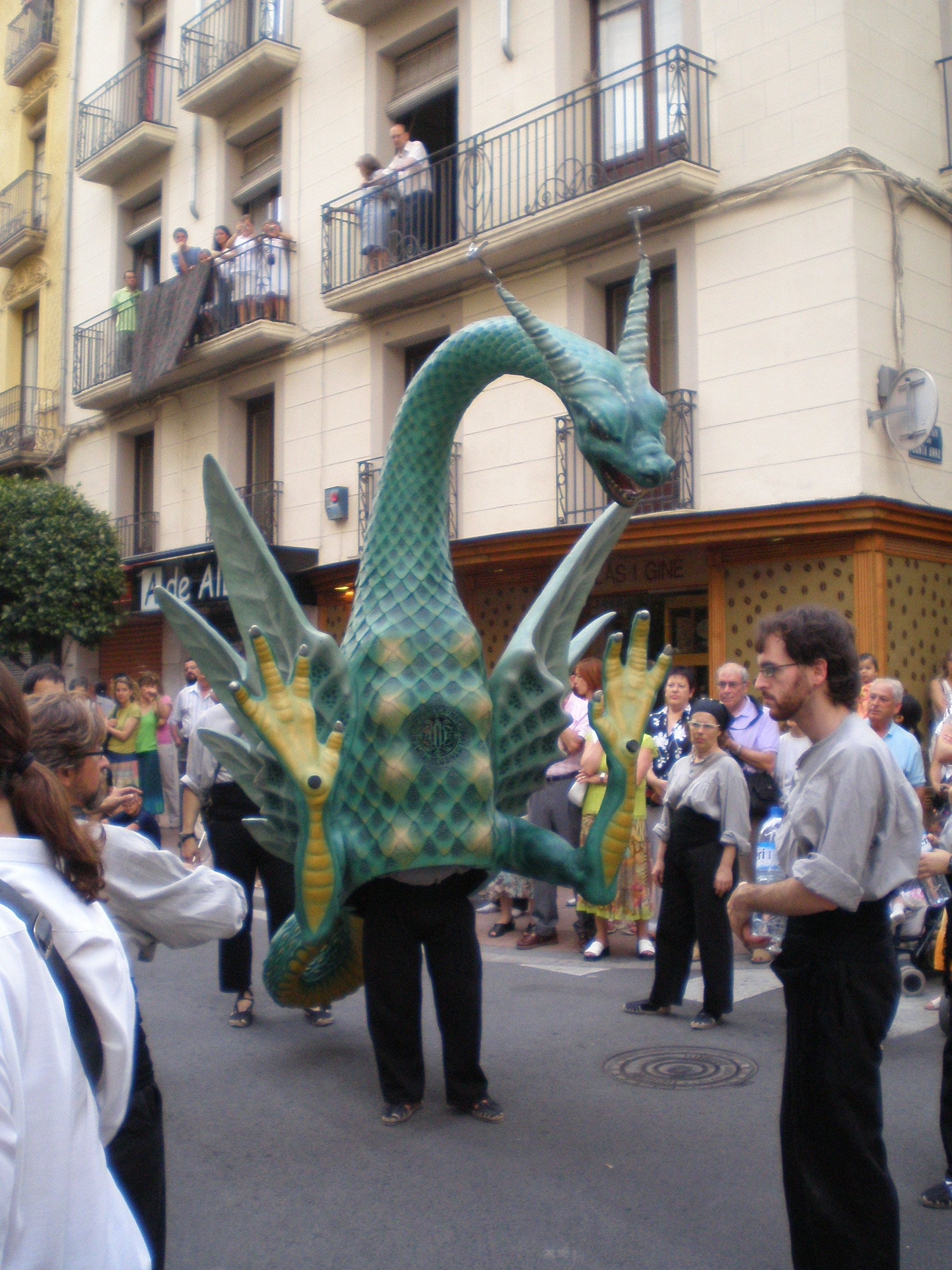
Vibria in a parade in Reus (Catalonia, Spain)

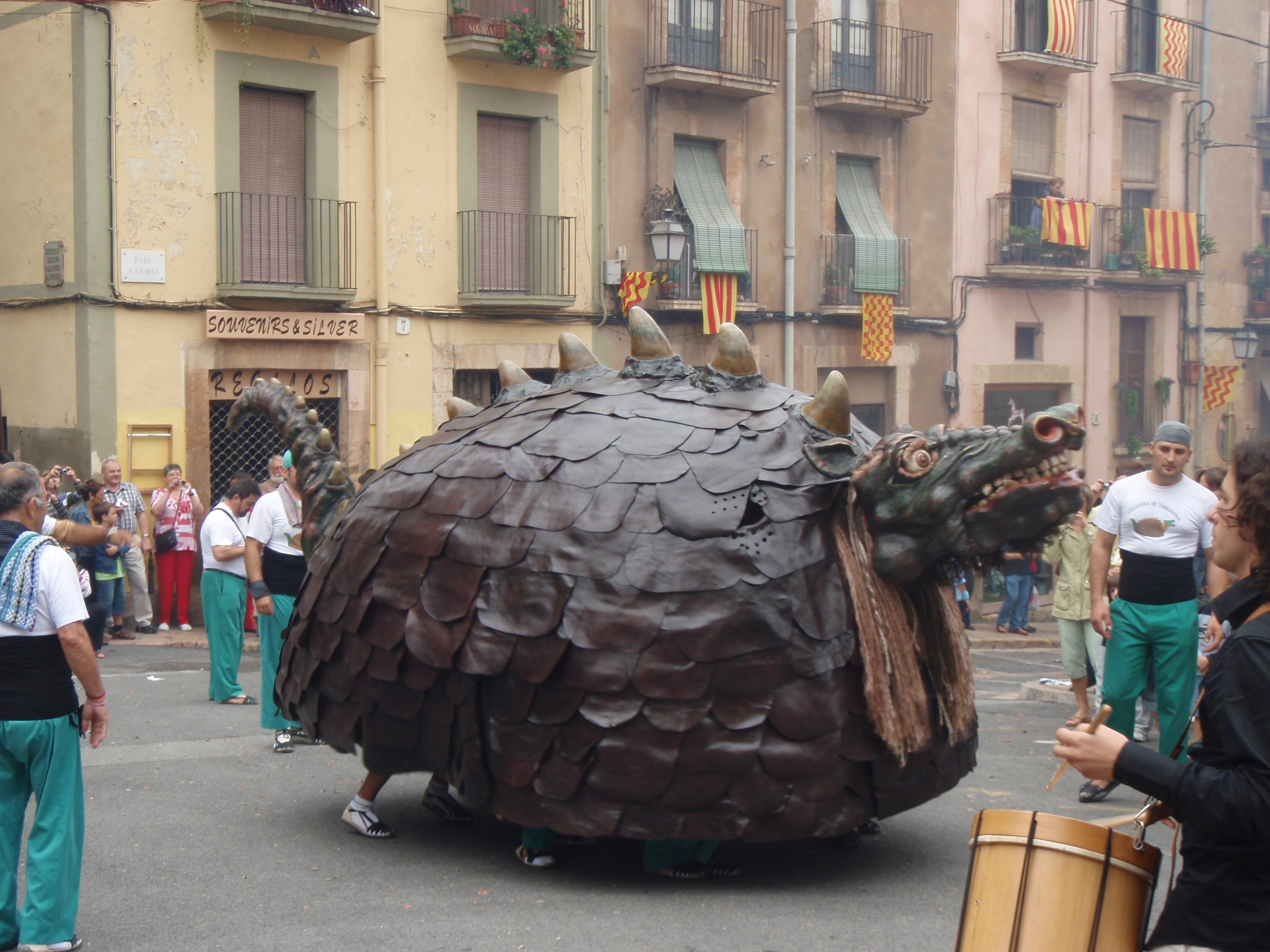
Cucafera during the "Festa Major de Santa Tecla" in Tarragona (Catalonia, Spain)

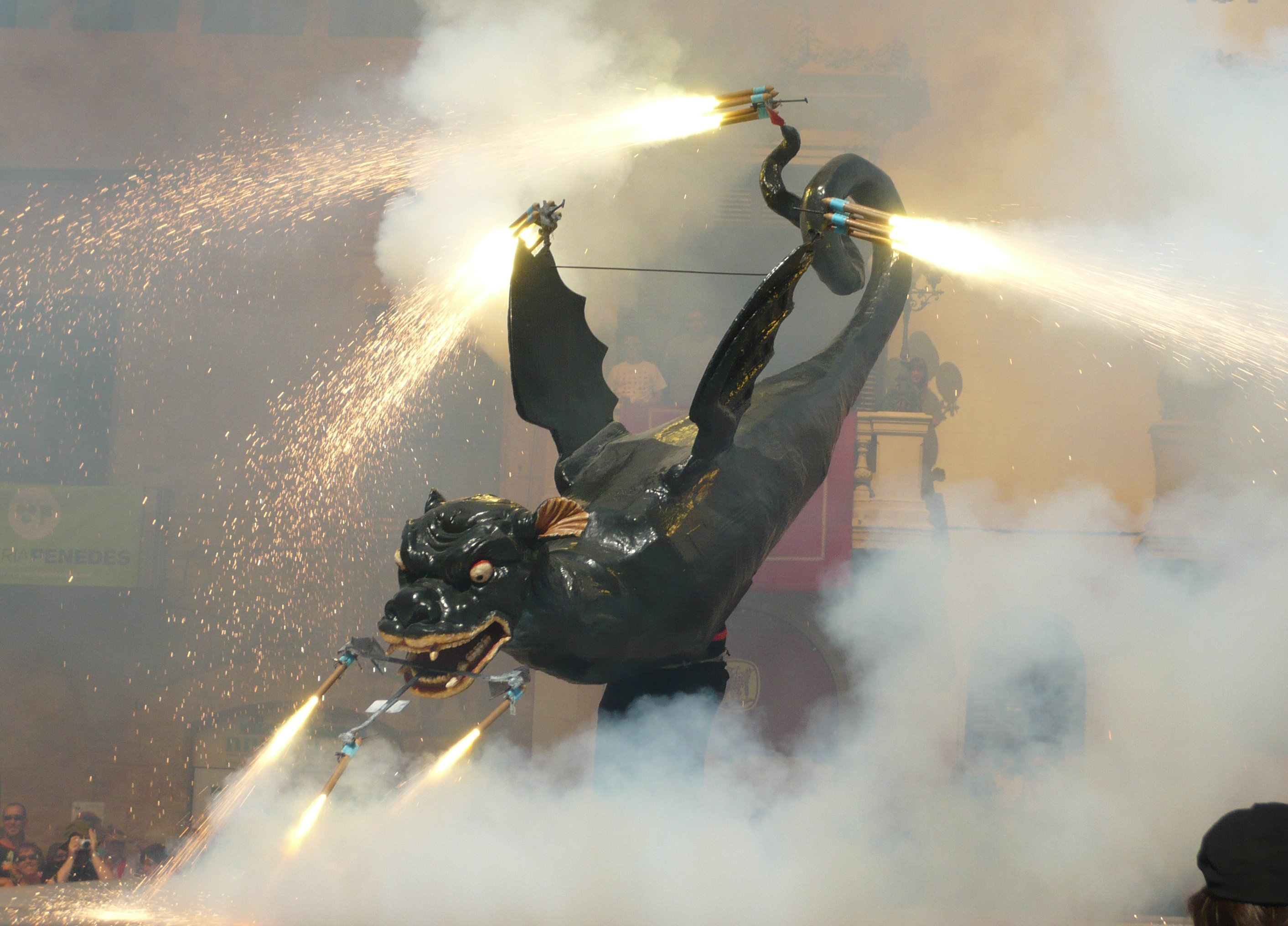
Drac de Vilafranca del Penedès (Catalonia, Spain) dancing during a correfoc

=== Italian ===
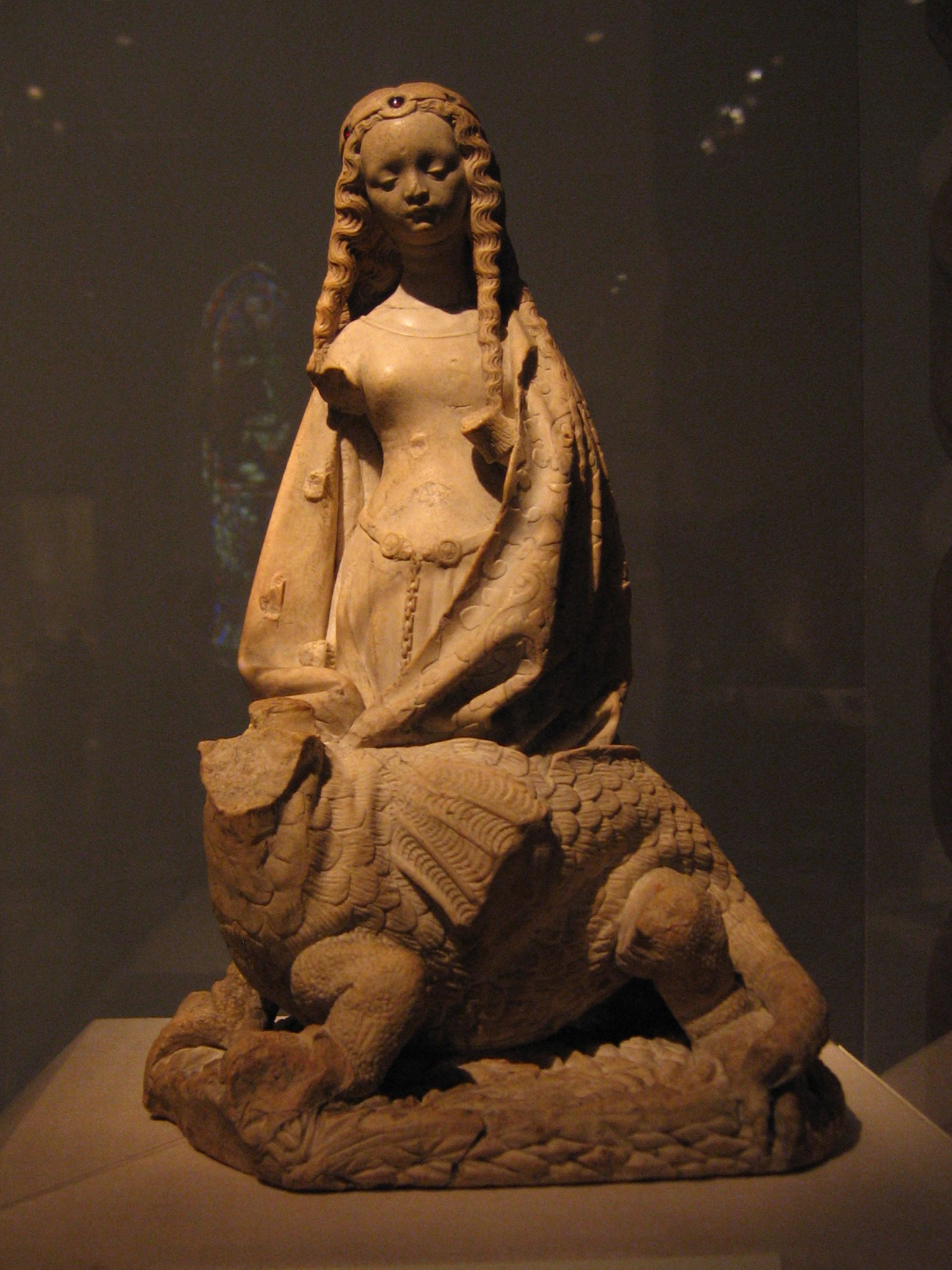
Saint Margaret and the Dragon, alabaster with traces of gilding, Toulouse, ca 1475 (Metropolitan Museum of Art)

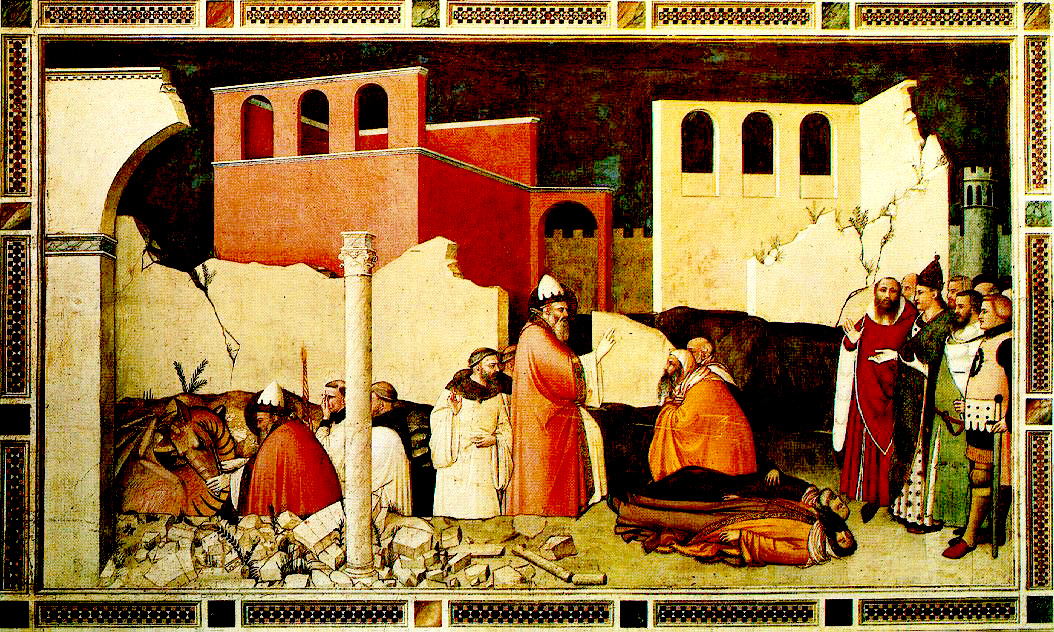
"Saint Silvestro resurrects two magicians, and the Fornole dragon", Vernio Bardi Chapel, Santa Croce (Florence)

Wyverns are usually evil in Italy, and there are many stories of wyverns being slain. Dragons also trick demons in Italian legends. The legend of Saint George and the wyvern is well known in Italy, but other saints are also depicted fighting wyverns. For instance, the first bishop of Forlì, Saint Mercurialis, was said to have killed a wyvern to save the city, so he is often depicted in the act of slaying a wyvern. Likewise, the first patron saint of Venice, Saint Theodore of Tyro, was a wyvern-slayer, and a statue representing his slaying of the wyvern still tops one of the two columns in St Mark's Square. St. Michael, the patron saint of paratroopers, is also frequently depicted slaying a wyvern.

According to the Golden Legend, compiled by the Italian Jacobus de Voragine, Saint Margaret the Virgin was swallowed by Satan in the shape of a hydra, but she escaped alive when the cross she carried irritated the hydra's innards. The Golden Legend, in an atypical moment of scepticism, describes this last incident as "apocryphal and not to be taken seriously" (trans. Ryan, 1.369), which did not prevent the legend from being popular and getting artistic treatments.

More prevalent are the legends about dragons in Italy, particularly in Umbria. One of the most famous wyverns of Italian folklore is Thyrus, a wyvern that besieged Terni in the Middle Ages. One day, a young and brave knight of the noble House of Cittadini, tired of witnessing the death of his fellow citizens and the depopulation of Terni, faced the wyvern and killed it. From that day, the town assumed the creature in its coat of arms, accompanied by a Latin inscription: "Thyrus et amnis dederunt signa Teramnis" ("Thyrus and the river gave their insignia to [the city of] Terni"), that stands under the banner of the town of Terni, honoring this legend.

Another poem tells of another dragon that lived near the village of Fornole, near Amelia, Umbria. Pope Sylvester I arrived in Umbria and freed the population of Fornole from the ferocity of the dragon, pacifying the dragon. Grateful for his deed, the population built a small church dedicated to the saint on the top of the mountain near the dragon's lair in the 13th century. In the apse of the church there is a fresco representing the iconography of the saint.

== Heraldry ==
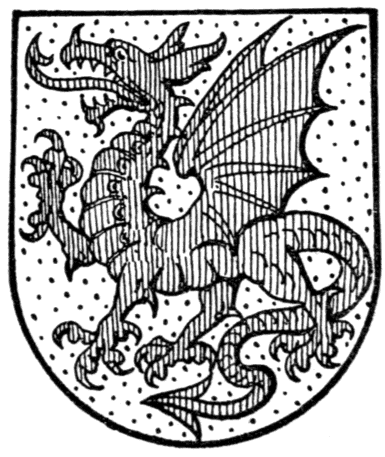
A dragon in the "German" form, depicted passant coward, from A Complete Guide to Heraldry

Coat of arms of the town of Svätý Jur ("Saint George") in western Slovakia

In British heraldry, dragons are depicted as four-legged, distinguishing them from the two-legged wyvern. They always possess wings similar to a bat's. Dragons are traditionally depicted with tongues ending in a barbed tip; recent heraldry depicts their tails as ending with a similar barb, but this trait originated after the Tudor period. During and before this era, dragons were always depicted with tails ending in a blunt tip. A heraldic dragon or wyvern depicted without wings is sometimes referred to as a lindworm.

In terms of attitude, dragons are typically shown statant (with all four legs on the ground), passant (with one leg raised), or rampant (rearing). They are very rarely depicted as coward (with their tail between their legs) in British heraldry, although this attitude is more frequent in German systems.

Dragon iconography is associated with legendary British figures such as King Uther Pendragon and King Arthur. Uther's mythic arms are attributed as having been two green dragons back-to-back, termed addorsed, crowned in red and on a gold field. Arthur is similarly described as having used two dragons addorsed. The use of heraldic dragons in England is recorded to the pre-Norman period, and dragon symbology is traditionally associated with the Saxons. King Cuthred of Wessex used a dragon banner, and the Bayeux Tapestry depicts a dragon-shaped standard above the Saxon army. Following the Conquest, red dragon standards are attested as having been used by British kings and royal forces, such the English army during the Battle of Crécy, Henry III during the Battle of Lewes, and Henry VII during the Battle of Bosworth Field, but were not typically integrated into royal coats of arms. Henry VIII used a red dragon as a supporter, although under King James this was replaced with the unicorn of Scotland. In later heraldry, the red dragon is associated strictly with Wales.

According to heraldic writer Arthur Charles Fox-Davies, the red dragon of Wales on the flag originated with the standard of the 7th-century king Cadwaladr and was used as a supporter by the Tudor dynasty (who were of Welsh origin). Queen Elizabeth, however, preferring gold, changed the color of the dragon supporter from red to gold gules, in parallel to her change of the royal mantle from gules and ermine to gold and ermine. There may be some doubt of the Welsh origin of the dragon supporter of the royal arms, but it certainly was used by King Henry III.

In England, a rampant red dragon (clutching a mace) is still the heraldic symbol of the county of Somerset. The county once formed part of the early medieval Anglo-Saxon kingdom of Wessex in western England, which too bore a dragon, or a wyvern, as a symbol. The Wessex beast is usually colored gold in illustrations. Dragons have also retained popularity among grants in the City of London, where two dragons serve as supporters for the crest of the city itself.

The Welsh flag is blazoned parti per fess Argent and Vert; a dragon Gules passant. Welsh rugby teams include the Newport Gwent Dragons and the Cardiff City Blue Dragons.

In continental European heraldry, the term "dragon" covers a greater variety of creatures than it does in British systems, including creatures such as the wyvern, the basilisk and the cockatrice. In German heraldry, the four-legged dragon is referred to as a Lindwurm.

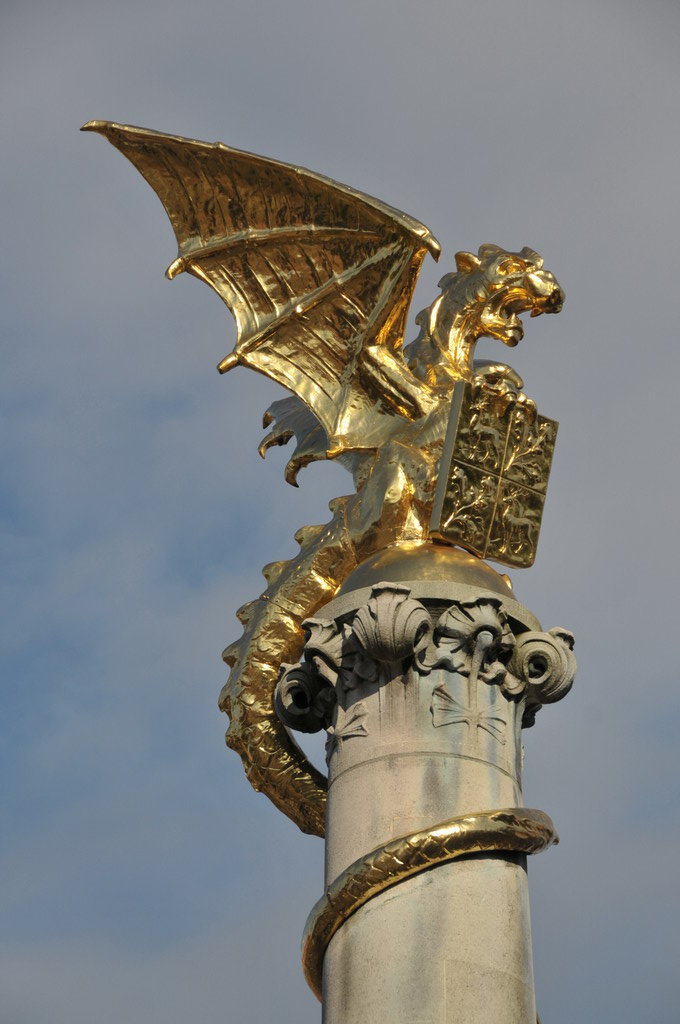
Dutch dragon in the city of 's-Hertogenbosch. The city is also known as 'the Swamp Dragon'

In Spain, there are many examples of dragons as heraldic symbols (particularly "dragantes": two opposing dragon faces biting some figure). Dragons were introduced as heraldic symbols by King Peter IV of Aragon, who used a dragon on his helmet to show that he was the king of Aragon, as a heraldic pun (Rei d'Aragón becoming Rei dragón; translating in English as "dragon king").

Historically, the coat of arms of Madrid included, besides a bear with a strawberry tree, a dragon. This dragon has its origin in a dragon, or a serpent according to Mesonero Romanos, that was shown on the keystone in the arch of a gate of the disappeared walls of Madrid known as "Puerta Cerrada" or "Puerta de la Sierpe" (Closed Gate or Wyrm Gate in English). In 1582 a fire destroyed the gate. At that time the walls had fallen into disuse, for this reason the gate and the surrounding wall have never been rebuilt. The serpent, become dragon, was retained as informal symbol of Madrid until the 19th century, when it was decided to incorporate the dragon in the coat of arms. The dragon then turned into a griffin, and the griffin disappeared from the coat of arms in 1967, although the heraldic dragon remains carved in stone in many monuments around the city.

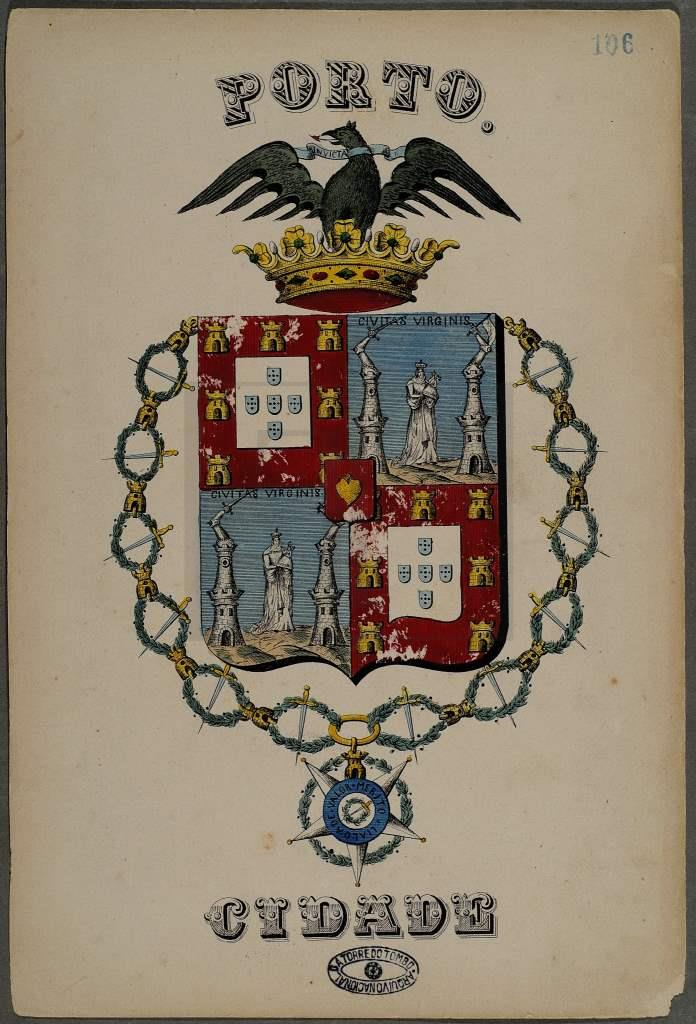
Former coat of arms of Porto.

A dragon was used as the crest of the greater royal coat of arms of Portugal from at least the 14th century. In the 19th century, King Peter IV of Portugal granted the city of Porto the incorporation of the dragon crest of the royal coat of arms in its municipal coat of arms, in gratitude for the support given to him by the city during the Liberal Wars. The badge of FC Porto incorporates the old Porto municipal coat of arms with the dragon crest; this is why the dragon was adopted as the animal mascot of the club.

In relatively recent additions to the image of a dragon, the tongue and the tail ended with a barb. The Tudor image of a dragon does no such thing, with the tail being long and pointy. The German Lindwurm seems to be where the English got their figure of a dragon. It is represented as a traditional one with scales, four legs, wings, sharp teeth, and horns.

- Mr. Mainwaring-Ellerker-Onslow's house was represented by a sea-dragon. This dragon is normal, in today's standards, for half its body and the other half has no hind legs and a large end of the tail. This is closer to the Chinese model of dragons.
- The Duke of Marlborough uses a wyvern sitting erect upon its tail with its claws in the air.
- The crest of the Lancashire family have a crest of the wyvern without wings and the tail knotted.
- While this is comparatively rare, two cockatrices are the supporters to Sir Edmund Charles Nugent.
- The Hydra is a crest comes from the families of Barret, Crespine, and Lownes.

== Modern dragons ==
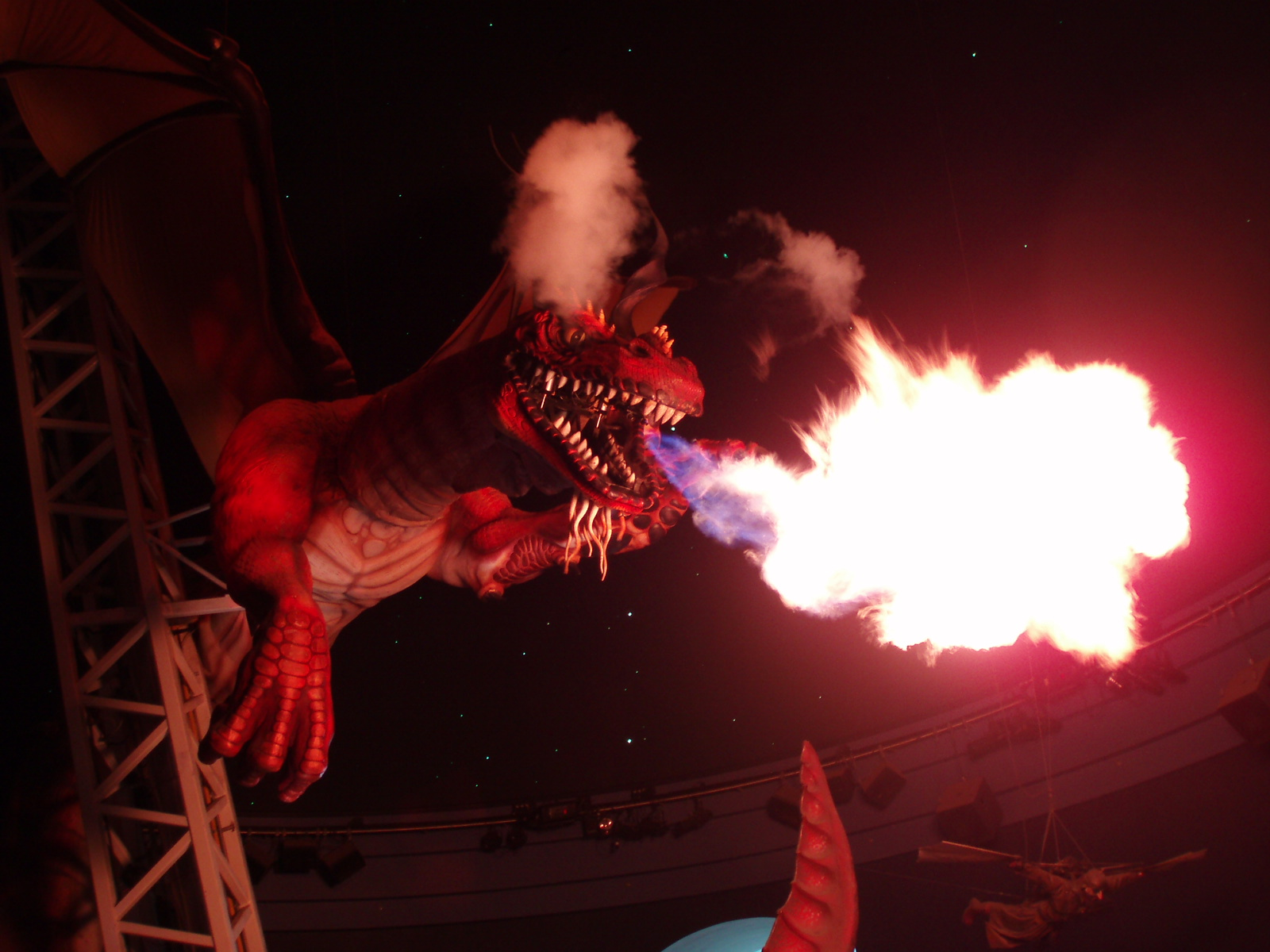
West Edmonton Mall's fire-breathing dragon animatronic. Removed in 2014 due to high maintenance costs and its drying-out rubber skin

The emblem books popular from late medieval times through the 17th century often represent the dragon as an emblem of greed. The prevalence of dragons in European heraldry demonstrates that there is more to the dragon than greed.

Agosti Xaho, a romantic myth creator of the 19th century, fused these myths in his own creation of Leherensuge, the first and last serpent, that, in his newly coined legend, would arise again some time in the future bringing the rebirth of an independent republic for the Basque people.

Dragons have long been portrayed in modern times as greedy treasure-hoarders, lusting for gold and precious gems. In such stories as Beowulf, the theft of such treasure sparks a dragon's fury. In the fantasy genre, however, there has been a trend of originally depicting dragons in a positive light: as allies instead of enemies, the red dragon of Wales, and the brother dragon of Poland. Dragons are increasingly viewed as friends of humans and as highly intelligent and noble creatures, while still remaining the fearsome beasts of legend. They are frequently shown as guardians and close friends of individual humans.

After the discovery of fossil pterosaurs in 1784, European-type dragons are often depicted without front legs, and, when on the ground, standing and walking pterosaur-fashion on their back feet and the wrists of their wings.

=== Recent fiction ===
Dragons play prominent roles in JRR Tolkien's Middle-earth legendarium, particularly in The Silmarillion and The Hobbit. His dragons, including Ancalagon the Black and Smaug, are able to speak; they have four legs, sometimes have wings, and sometimes breathe fire.

Many of these modern ideas were first popularised by Anne McCaffrey with her Dragonriders of Pern series.

Ursula K. Le Guin has prominent dragons in her books about Earthsea.

Later authors such as Christopher Paolini also depicted sympathetic dragon characters in Eragon.

Ffyrnig, the Last Great Dragon of Legend of the Heart Eaters, the first book in the story of Jonah and the Last Great Dragon by M.E.Holley is based on an actual legend of the Welsh Borders, which tells that the last great dragon is asleep under the Radnor Forest, imprisoned there by St. Michael.

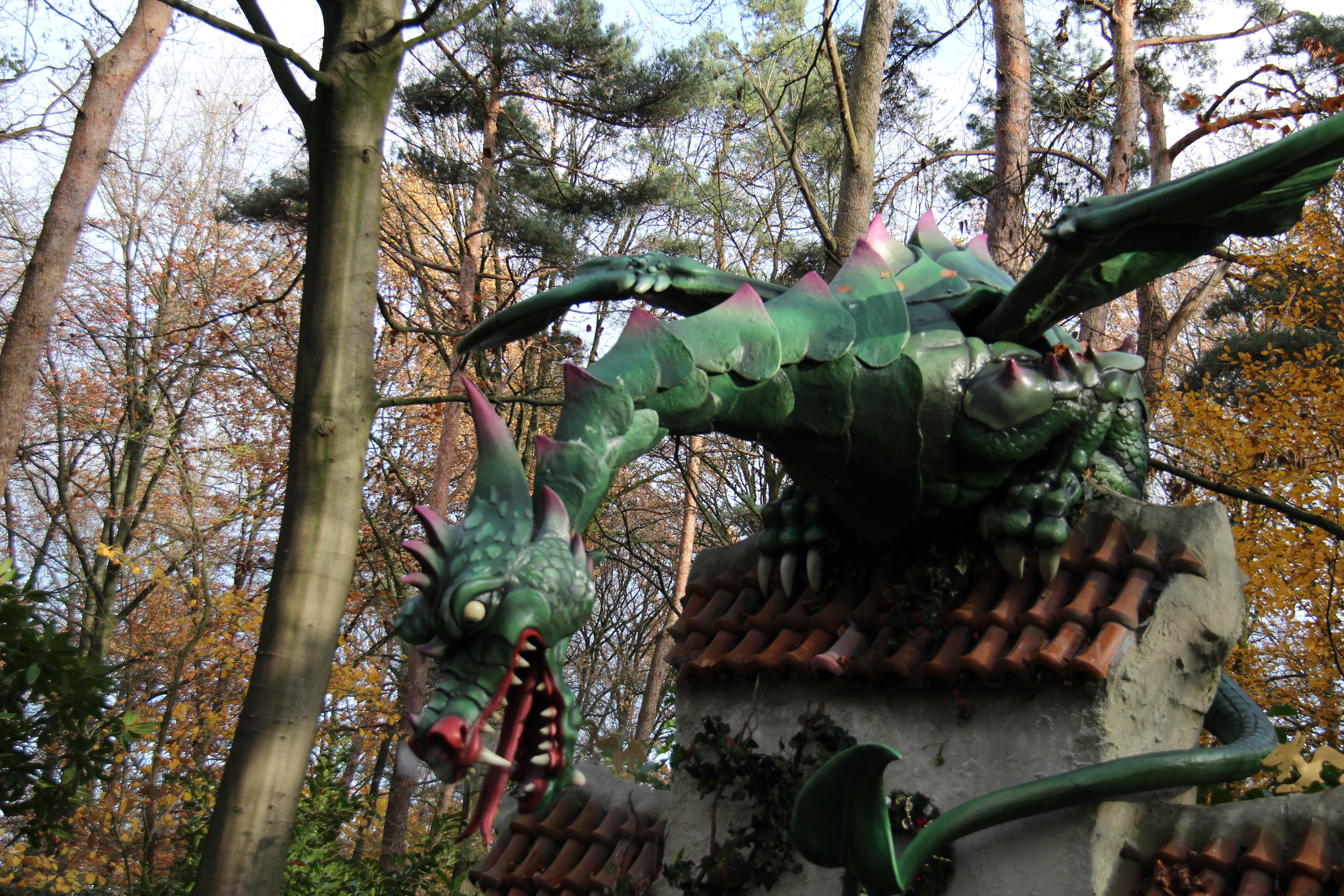
"The Dragon" in the Efteling.

The Efteling has since 1979 an animatronic scene in the Fairytale Forest that depicts an archetypical Western European dragon protecting a treasure from getting stolen by the public.

Bryan Davis's Dragons in Our Midst series depicts dragons as noble and kind beasts, having the ability to marry and reproduce with humans.

E. D. Baker's Tales of the Frog Princess series frequently includes dragons, and people who can change between human shape and dragon shape.

The A Song of Ice and Fire / Game of Thrones series includes dragons and dragon-riders.

How To Train Your Dragon is a series of twelve children's books, written by British author Cressida Cowell. The books are set in a fictional Viking world and focus on the experiences of protagonist Hiccup as he overcomes great obstacles on his journey of Becoming a Hero, the Hard Way.

Tui T. Sutherland's book series Wings of Fire is set in a dragon-dominant world where five dragonets must complete a prophecy to end a twenty-year-long war.

The Temeraire series by Naomi Novik combines dragons with tropes from the Age of Sail.

== See also ==
- Chinese dragon
- Dragon
- Dragons in Greek mythology
- Dragons in Manipuri mythology
- Japanese dragon
- List of dragons in literature
- List of dragons in mythology and folklore
- List of dragons in popular culture
- Animal representation in Western medieval art
