= The Frog Prince =

German fairy tale

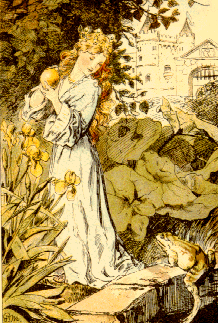
- The Frog Prince by Paul Friedrich Meyerheim (1889)

Folk tale
- Name: The Frog Prince
- Also known as: The Frog Prince; or, Iron Henry
- Aarne–Thompson grouping: AT 440 ("The Frog King")
- Region: Germany
- Published in: Kinder- und Hausmärchen, by the Brothers Grimm (1812)

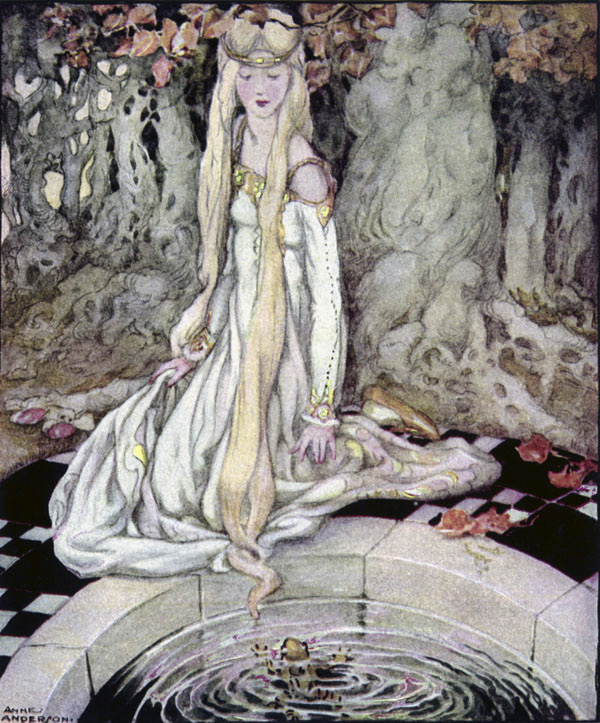
The Frog Prince by Anne Anderson

"The Frog Prince; or, Iron Henry" (German: Der Froschkönig oder der eiserne Heinrich, literally "The Frog King or the Iron Henry") is a German fairy tale collected by the Brothers Grimm and published in 1812 in Grimms' Fairy Tales (KHM 1). Traditionally, it is the first story in their folktale collection. The tale is classified as Aarne-Thompson type 440.

"The Frog Prince" can be compared to the similar eastern European fairy tale "The Frog Princess".

== Origin ==
=== Editions ===
The story is best known through the rendition of the Brothers Grimm, who published it in their 1812 edition of Kinder- und Hausmärchen (Grimms' Fairy Tales), as tale no. 1. An older, moralistic version was included in the Grimms' handwritten Ölenberg Manuscript from 1810. Jack Zipes noted in 2016 that the Grimms greatly treasured this tale, considering it to be one of the "oldest and most beautiful in German-speaking regions."

=== Sources ===
The Grimms' source is unclear, but apparently comes from an oral tradition of Dortchen Wild's family in Kassel. Volume 2 of the first edition of Kinder- und Hausmärchen, published in 1815, included a variation of this story entitled Der Froschprinz (The Frog Prince), published as tale no. 13. As this version was not included in later editions, it has since remained relatively unknown.

It has been postulated by some scholars that parts of the tale may extend back until at least Roman times; an aspect of the story is referred to in Petronius' Satyricon, in which the character Trimalchio remarks, "qui fuit rana nunc est rex" ("The man who was once a frog is now a king"). Other scholars, however, argue that this may actually be a jab at the emperor Nero, who was often mockingly compared to a frog.

Folklorist Stith Thompson suggested that the story of the Frog King in the German tradition began with a 13th-century literary tale written in Latin.

== Plot ==
In the forest, a selfish princess accidentally drops her golden ball into a well. A frog offers to retrieve it in exchange for her friendship. She agrees but goes back on her word after getting the ball back and runs to her castle. The next day, she is eating with her father when the frog knocks on the door and requests to be let in. The king tells his daughter that she must keep her promise, and she reluctantly obeys. The frog sits next to her and eats from her plate, then desires to sleep in the princess's bed. She is disgusted at the idea of sleeping with the frog, but her father angrily chastises her for loathing someone who helped her in a time of need. She picks up the frog and places him in the corner of her bedroom, but he hops up to her bed and demands to sleep as comfortably as the princess. Furious, she throws the frog against the wall, but as he falls to the floor he has transformed into a handsome prince. He explains that he was cursed by a wicked witch and the spell could only be broken with the princess's help. The next day, the two go to the prince's kingdom where they will be married.

In modern versions, the transformation is triggered by the princess kissing the frog (a motif that apparently first appeared in English translations). In other early versions, it was sufficient for the frog to sleep for three nights on the princess' pillow.

The frog prince also has a loyal servant named Henry (or Heinrich) who had three iron bands affixed around his heart to prevent it from breaking from sadness when his master was cursed. When the frog prince reverts to his human form, Henry's overwhelming happiness causes the bands to break, freeing his heart from its bonds.

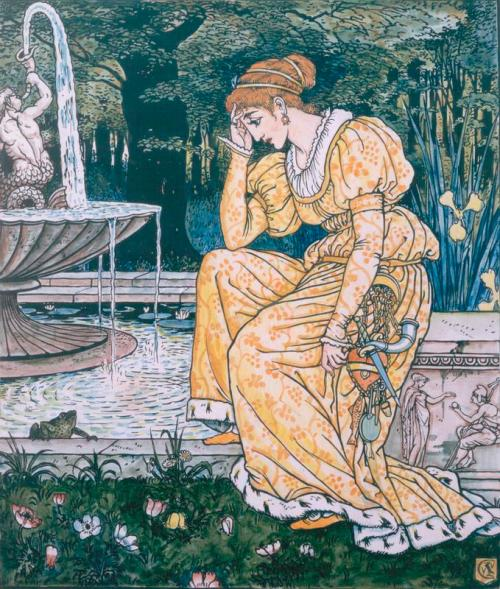
The Princess meets the Frog by the Fountain by Walter Crane, 1874, Aberdeen Art Gallery

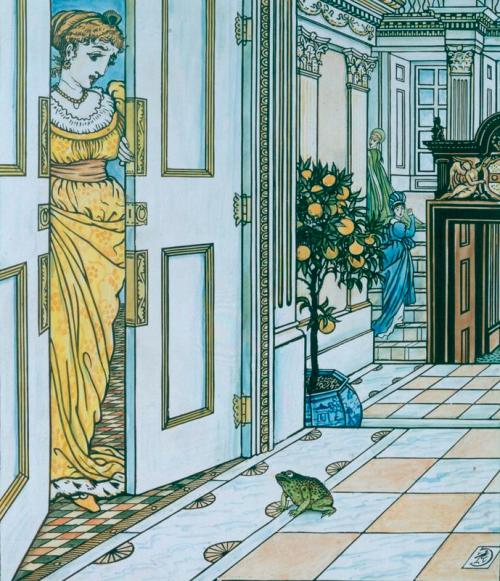
The Frog Asks To Be Allowed To Enter The Castle by Walter Crane, 1874, Aberdeen Art Gallery

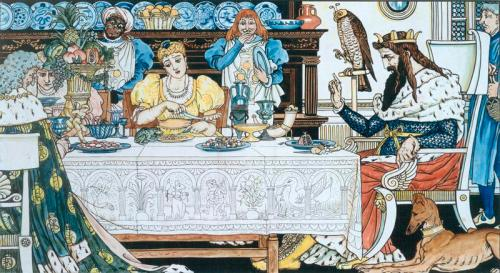
The Frog shares the Princess' Meal by Walter Crane, 1874, Aberdeen Art Gallery

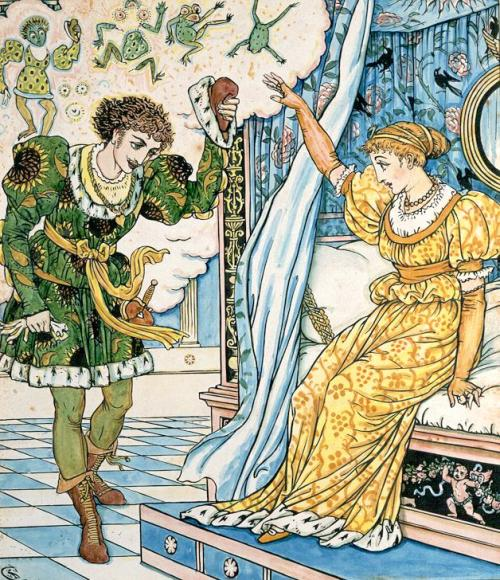
The Frog Turns Into A Prince by Walter Crane, 1874, Aberdeen Art Gallery

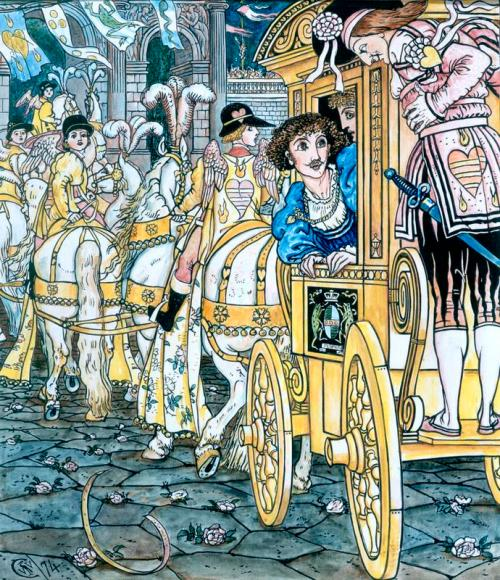
The Wedding Procession by Walter Crane, 1874, Aberdeen Art Gallery

== Variants ==
=== Distribution ===
It is Aarne–Thompson type 440. According to German folklorist Hans-Jörg Uther, variants are registered across Europe. In addition, scholars Lutz Röhrich, Waldemar Liungman, and Jurjen van der Kooi noted that, apart from some isolated attestations in the southern part of the continent and in Eastern Europe, variants of the tale were collected in the northern part of Europe, comprising a sort of "core area": Germany, Denmark, Sweden, Finland, Belgium and Netherlands, extending to Ireland and Great Britain.

However, Röhrich and van der Kooi remarked that the variants collected from oral tradition, even in America, clearly go back to a European original, and Uther argues that they are dependent on the Grimm's tale. That argument does not take into account the Scottish version of the story found referenced in the 16th century Scottish text "Complaynt of Scotland". (See Opie and Opie "The Classic Fairy Tales" (1974) p. 183.)

=== Other tales ===
Other folktales similar to "The Frog Prince" are:

1. "The Frog Prince". The first English translation of the above tale. Edgar Taylor, the translator, not only changed the title, but altered the ending in a substantial and interesting manner.
2. "The Wonderful Frog" (W. Henry Jones and Lewis L. Kropf, Hungary).
3. "The Tale of the Queen Who Sought a Drink From a Certain Well" (J. F. Campbell, Scotland).
4. "The Well of the World's End"
5. "The Paddo" (Robert Chambers, Scotland).
6. "The Maiden and the Frog" (James Orchard Halliwell-Phillipps, England).
7. "Oda und die Schlange" (Oda and the Snake) (Ludwig Bechstein, Germany) – a variant where a serpent replaces the frog
8. "The Kind Stepdaughter and the Frog" (W. Henry Jones and Lewis L. Kropf, England).
9. "The Frog Prince" (H. Parker, Sri Lanka).
10. "A Frog for a Husband" (William Elliot Griffis, Korea).
11. "The Toad Bridegroom" (Zong In-Sob, Korea).

A similar tale type is ATU 402, "The Animal Bride". In these tales, a female animal (mouse, cat or frog) helps a prince with three tasks and after marrying him, assumes human form. In Puddocky (old word for toad), another German folk tale, and likewise "Tsarevna Lyagushka" (The Frog Princess), a Russian folk tale, the male and female roles of the frog prince are reversed. Prince Ivan Tsarevitch discovers the enchanted female frog, who becomes Vasilisa the Wise, a sorceress.

In a Latvian tale, Little White Dog, a girl is tasked with getting water from a well without getting the bucket wet. A little white dog appears and promises to help her if she accepts him as her bridegroom.

=== Predecessors ===
A possible parallel in Antiquity may be found in the story of Amymone, who was one of the Danaides. She went to fetch water in a jug because of a drought season caused by the gods. A satyr tried to force himself on her, but the god Poseidon rescued her. It has been suggested that the amphibian suitor and the handsome prince may have been separate characters at first.

According to the Brothers Grimm, they collected another variant from Hesse with a similar narrative of the frog suitor: a king is ill and sends his three daughters to fetch some healing water from a well in their courtyard. The elder princess draws some water that is muddy, when a frog hops in and asks her to be its sweetheart, saying that otherwise she will only be able to fetch dirty water. The elder refuses, and so does the middle princess. The cadette princess agrees to be the frog's sweetheart and brings back fresh, clean water for her father. Later, the frog appears at the castle and asks the princess to honor her promise, so she lets the animal in and lets it sleep on her bed with her.

== Cultural legacy ==
=== Prose ===
- Stevie Smith's poem "The Frog Prince" (1966) suggests the thoughts of the prince as he waits for disenchantment.
- Anne Sexton wrote an adaptation as a poem called "The Frog Prince" in her collection Transformations (1971), a book in which she re-envisions sixteen of the Grimms' fairy tales.
- Robin McKinley's 1981 collection of short stories The Door in the Hedge contains a version of the tale, entitled "The Princess and the Frog".
- Linda Medley's graphic novel Castle Waiting from 1996 contains a character named Iron Henry or Iron Heinrich, who has 3 iron bands around his heart to repair the heartbreak he suffered when his son died of a fearful curse.
- French graphic novel Garulfo (1992–2002) is a fairy tale about a frog who asks a witch to transform him into a prince - so that he can live life at the top of the food chain.
- Bill Willingham's graphic novel series Fables features many fairytale characters living as refugees in New York, including Ambrose "Flycatcher" the former Frog Prince, now a janitor and errand boy.
- Robert Coover wrote a "reimagined" version of the tale for The New Yorker in 2014.

=== Stage ===
- Adelheid Wette based her 1896 play on "The Frog Prince", although she called it "The Frog King".
- Margarete Schweikert based her 1913 children's operetta "The Frog King" on the Grimm Brothers' fairytale "The Frog Prince".
- A musical version of The Frog Prince, written by Dieter Stegmann and Alexander S. Bermange, was presented at the Amphitheater Park Schloss Philippsruhe in Hanau, Germany as part of the Brothers Grimm Festival in 2005.
- A chamber opera for children based upon The Frog Prince, written by Jacob A. Greenberg for Brown Opera Productions and the Providence Athenaeum, was performed in 2008.
- The Children's Theatre of Cincinnati's Script Development Division adapted the one-act musical Princess & Frog in 2020. The stage musical is adapted from the full-length musical Croaker written by Jason Marks and Debra Clinton.
- The English alternative rock band Keane released a song titled "The Frog Prince" within their 2004 UK number-one album Under The Iron Sea.

=== Film ===
- The Frog (1908), directed by Segundo de Chomón, is the first film adaptation of "The Frog Prince".
- The Frog Prince was a 1971 film starring Robin the Frog, Trudy Young and Gordon Thomson.
- The Frog Prince is a 1986 film starring John Paragon and Aileen Quinn.
- Prince Charming is a 2001 film adaptation of the fairy tale, starring Martin Short, Christina Applegate and Sean Maguire as the title character. The prince is cursed to remain a frog until a maiden breaks his spell, giving him extreme longevity and allowing for the modern setting of the film.
- In Shrek 2, Fiona's father King Harold is secretly the Frog Prince. However, unlike the fairy tale where the princess meets him as a frog and her actions make him human, he becomes human through a deal with the Fairy Godmother.
- The Princess and the Frog is a 2009 Disney animated film loosely inspired by the 2002 novel The Frog Princess by E. D. Baker. The Frog Prince story itself appears in the film, being read to the film's protagonist, Tiana, as a child and motivating the prince-turned-frog Naveen to ask Tiana to kiss him to break the spell. However, the kiss turns her into a frog as well.

=== Television ===
- "The Tale of the Frog Prince" was the first story presented by Shelley Duvall's Faerie Tale Theatre in 1982, with Robin Williams as the witty Frog Prince and Teri Garr as the vain princess.
- "The Frog Prince" was one of the fairy tales featured in Grimm's Fairy Tale Classics in its Grimm Masterpiece Theater season (1987). In the English version, the princess is named Leonora, her two older sisters are Agatha and Martha, and her father is King Bartholomew.
- "The Frog Prince" was enacted by Achim (Joachim Kaps) and Kunibert (Hans-Joachim Leschnitz) in a 1988 episode of Brummkreisel.
- "The Frog Prince" was one of the episodes of Happily Ever After: Fairy Tales for Every Child
- In the second episode of Adventures from the Book of Virtues (1996), Plato the Bison and Annie try to convince their friend Zach to tell his father the truth by telling him three stories, including one about "The Frog Prince". In this version, the title character was transformed into a frog for lying to a witch and breaking his promise. He is voiced by Jeff Bennett while the princess is voiced by Paige O'Hara.
- In the German cartoon Simsala Grimm, the episode is titled "The Frog King" in season 1. In this version, the princess is named Matilda and her love interest is Prince Edward. Unlike other versions, where the princess angrily slams the frog into a wall, killing him, Princess Matilda slams the frog into a wall, causing him to feel dizzy and making her apologize to him.
- The tale was adapted for German television as one of the episodes of fairy tale series Sechs auf einen Streich ("Six at one Blow") in the 2008 season.

=== Games ===
- The 1995 video game Yoshi's Island features a frog as a boss called Prince Froggy.
- Hidden object game series Dark Parables used the tale as basis for its second installment (The Exiled Prince).
- In the game Just Dance 2015, the routine for Love Is All is inspired by this fairy tale, the frog (P2, C1) starts out as a little statue on the fountain. As the song starts, the frog comes to life and grows up. Towards the end of the routine, the princess (P1) kisses the frog and it turns into a prince.
- A version of The Frog Prince, Prince Gerard, is a main character in the Neverafter season of the tabletop role-playing game show Dimension 20. He is played by Brian K. Murphy.

== See also ==
- The Frog Princess
- The Princess and the Frog
- Puddocky
- The Three Feathers (the female frog as the bride)
- The Frog Princess, a novel by E. D. Baker
- Henry F. Urban, author of the play Der Froschkönig
- The Calf's Skin
