= The Tale of the Queen Who Sought a Drink From a Certain Well =

Scottish fairy tale

"The Tale of the Queen Who Sought a Drink From a Certain Well" (Scottish Gaelic: Sgeulachd Ban-Righ a dh' Iarr Deoch a Tobar Araid) is a Scottish fairy tale collected by John Francis Campbell in Popular Tales of the West Highlands, listing his informant as Mrs. MacTavish, Port Ellen, Islay, and noting the story could be traced back to 1548.

It is Aarne-Thompson 440, the frog prince. The creature involved was called a losgann, which could be either a frog or a toad.

== Synopsis ==
An ill queen sent each of her daughters to a well for healing water. They each met a losgann who asked her to marry him, for a drink. The first two refused him as an ugly creature and were unable to get water. The youngest agreed to marry him for the water. She took the water home and healed her mother.

The losgann came to the door and told her to remember her pledge. First she put him behind the door, then under a bucket, then in a little bed by the fireplace, then a bed beside her own bed, but nothing stopped him. Finally, he told her to take down a rusty sword behind the bed and cut off his head. She did, and he became a handsome young prince, who married her.

== Analysis ==
The tale is classified in the international Aarne-Thompson-Uther Index as tale type ATU 440, "The Frog Prince".

== See also ==
- The Frog Prince
- The Well of the World's End
