= The Well of the World's End =

The Well of the World's End is an Anglo-Scottish Border fairy tale, recorded in the Scottish Lowlands, collected by Joseph Jacobs in English Fairy Tales. His source was The Complaynt of Scotland, and he notes the tale's similarity to the German Frog Prince. Like that tale, it is Aarne-Thompson type 440, "The Frog King" or "Iron Henry".

== Synopsis ==
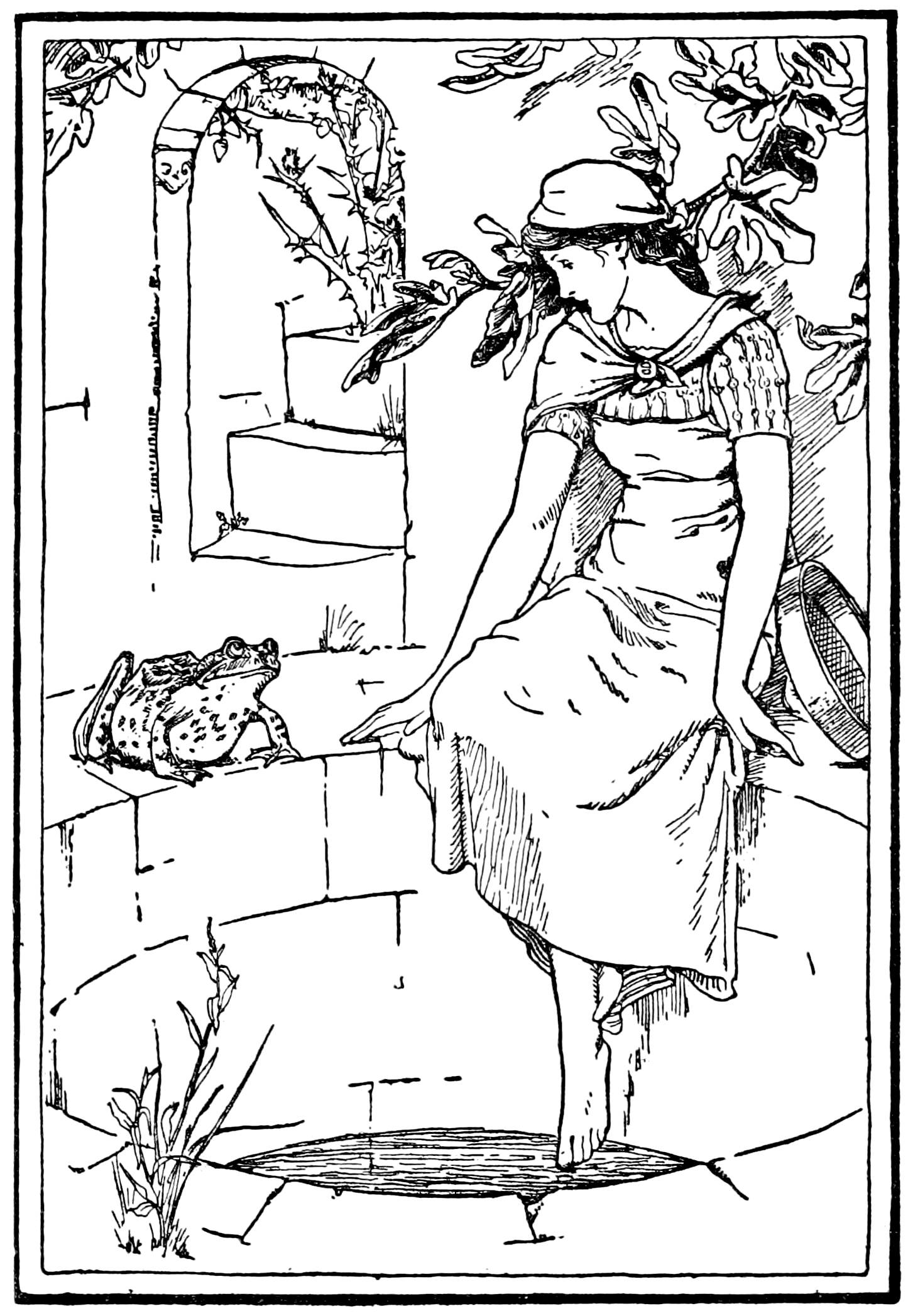
Illustration by John D. Batten

A girl's mother died, and her father remarried. Her stepmother abused her, made her do all the housework, and finally decided to be rid of her. She gave her a sieve and ordered her to not come back without filling it at the Well of the World's End. The girl set out and questioned everyone about the way. Finally, a little old woman directed her to the well, but she could not fill the sieve. She wept. A frog asked what was wrong and said it could aid her if she promised to do everything he asked for a night. She agreed, and the frog told her to stop the holes up with moss and clay. With that, she carried back the water.

The stepmother was angry at her return, and when the frog arrived, she insisted that the girl keep her promise. The frog made her take it on her knee, give it some supper, and take it to the bed with her. In the morning, it made her chop off its head. When she did, it turned into a handsome prince. The stepmother was even more angry, but the prince married the girl and took her to live in his castle.

== Analysis ==
The tale is classified in the international Aarne-Thompson-Uther Index as type ATU 440, "The Frog Prince".

== See also ==
- Frog Prince
- The Frog Princess
- The Tale of the Queen Who Sought a Drink From a Certain Well
- The Three Heads in the Well
