= The Frog Princess (novel) =

2002 novel by E. D. Baker

- Author: E. D. Baker
- Language: English
- Series: Tales of the Frog Princess
- Publisher: Bloomsbury
- Publication date: September 2, 2002
- Publication place: United States
- Pages: 224
- ISBN: 0747560749
- OCLC: 59468312
- Followed by: Dragon's Breath

The Frog Princess is a novel by E. D. Baker. First published in 2002, the story is a parody of the Brothers Grimm fairy tale "The Frog Prince".

The 2009 Disney film The Princess and the Frog is loosely based on this novel.

== Plot summary ==
Princess Emeralda of Greater Greensward is unhappy with her life. She is clumsy, her laugh sounds like a donkey's bray, and she cannot perform magic nearly as well her aunt, the Green Witch Grassina. When the stuck-up Prince Jorge comes to visit, Emma sneaks away to the swamp where she meets a talking frog who claims to be Prince Eadric of Upper Montevista. He has been cursed by a wicked witch for criticizing her fashion sense and only a kiss from a princess can break the spell. Uninterested in kissing a frog she just met and disliking his attitude, she returns home to speak to Grassina about her encounter.

The next day, Queen Chartreuse reveals that she has arranged for Emma to marry Jorge. Desperate for someone to speak with, Emma goes back to the swamp and agrees to give Eadric his kiss. To her surprise, she instead turns into a frog as well. After spending some time getting used to her new form, she and Eadric set off to find the witch and ask her to change them back.

Upon reaching the site where Eadric was cursed, they find a witch searching there, but realize too late that she is not the one who turned him into a frog. They are captured and taken to the witch's cottage where all sorts of animals are kept prisoner. L'il Stinker the bat reveals that the witch is named Vannabe and took over the cottage from Mudine (the witch that cursed Eadric), who fell ill and disappeared in a puff a smoke one year ago. Vannabe plans to use the frogs' tongues and toes for a spell to make herself eternally youthful and beautiful.

Emma is able to use one of Mudine's spell books to free all the animals. She decides to return home to ask Grassina how to change back into humans. L'il and a snake named Fang accompany them as protection during their journey through the forest. At the castle, Grassina reveals that when Emma kissed Eadric, she had been wearing a charm-reversing bracelet that Grassina had given her to prevent witches from casting spells on Emma. To transform back, Emma and Eadric will have to kiss again while wearing the bracelet. Emma remembers that it was stolen by an otter when she turned into a frog, so the three head to the swamp to retrieve it.

Emma disguises herself off as "the swamp fairy" to convince the otter to turn over the bracelet. She puts it on and kisses Eadric as a dog that has been pursuing them throughout their journey approaches. The two turn back into humans and the dog transforms as well, reavealed to be Eadric's horse, Bright Country, who had also been cursed by Mudine. They find Grassina with the otter, whom she recognizes as her old beau named Haywood who had been cursed by Emma's disapproving grandmother many years ago. The two couples make plans to convince their respective parents that they have found their true loves.

== Characters ==
- Emeralda "Emma" – The princess of Greater Greensward.
- Eadric – The prince of Upper Montevista who has been turned into a frog.
- Grassina – The younger sister of Greater Greensward's queen, as well as the Green Witch. She is very close to her niece Emma.
- Chartreuse – The queen of Greater Greensward, and Emma's mother. She has always had a rocky relationship with her daughter.
- L'il Stinker, a.k.a. L'il – A bat held hostage at a witch's cabin. After Emma freed her, she decided to stay with Emma.
- Fang – A snake also held hostage at a witch's cabin. When Emma frees him, he offers to escort them back to the castle.

== Reception and reviews ==
Diane Roback was mixed in her review for Publishers Weekly saying that "the tale occasionally offers peppy dialogue and some comical scenes—particularly as the newly transformed Emeralda adjusts to catching flies ("My eye-tongue coordination wasn't very good," she admits). Unfortunately, the plot does not make much of the magical elements (for example, the characters' encounters with a dragon and a nymph seem inconsequential), resulting in a disappointingly flat fantasy."

Todd Morning was positive in his review for Booklist saying "the ending in this fairy tale–twisting first novel is rather like a Shakespearean comedy, with lots of disguises revealed. Unlike some takeoffs that revolve around one joke, this manages to be entertaining throughout, helped along by Emeralda's amusing first person narration and the many witty lines."

Nancy Menaldi-Scanlon in her review for School Library Journal thought that the vocabulary did not match the book's intended audience saying "The tale moves at a good pace, and, though the happy ending is predictable, the trials and tribulations that precede it are interesting. However, it's difficult to determine the book's audience. While the story would appeal to primary to intermediate grade girls, the vocabulary is rather sophisticated and seems to be more suited to young adults."

== Sequels ==
E.D. Baker followed The Frog Princess with more books in the series chronicling Emma and Eadric's adventures: Dragon's Breath (2005), Once Upon a Curse (2006), and No Place for Magic (2008), as well as a prequel, The Salamander Spell (2008).

There is also an epilogue series of the books about Emma and Eadrics' daughter, Millie. The titles for that series are The Dragon Princess, Dragon Kiss and the most recent, A Prince Among Frogs.

== See also ==
- "The Frog Prince"
- The Princess and the Frog
