= E. D. Baker =

American children's novelist

Elizabeth Dawson Baker is an American children's novelist who made her international debut in 2002 with The Frog Princess, a parody of the Brothers Grimm fairy tale "The Frog Prince". The novel became a Texas Lone Star Reading List Book, A Book Sense Children's Pick, a Florida's Sunshine State Readers List pick and a 2006 Sasquatch Book Award nominee, and also partly inspired the 2009 Disney film The Princess and the Frog.

== Bibliography ==
=== Tales of the Frog Princess series ===
- The Frog Princess (2002) ISBN 978-1619636170 ~ Bloomsbury USA Children's; New edition (August 26, 2014)
- Dragon's Breath (2004) ISBN 978-1619636200 ~ Bloomsbury USA Children's; New edition (August 26, 2014)
- Once Upon A Curse (2004) ISBN 978-1619636194 ~ Bloomsbury USA Children's; New edition (August 26, 2014)
- No Place For Magic (2006) ISBN 978-1619636187 ~ Bloomsbury USA Children's; Reprint edition (August 26, 2014)
- The Salamander Spell (2007) ISBN 978-1619636217 ~ Bloomsbury USA Children's; New edition (February 24, 2015)
- The Dragon Princess (2008) ISBN 978-1599904481 ~ Bloomsbury USA Children's; New edition (February 24, 2015)
- Dragon Kiss (2009) ISBN 978-1619636231 ~ Bloomsbury USA Children's; New edition (February 24, 2015)
- A Prince Among Frogs (2009) ISBN 978-1619636248 ~ Bloomsbury USA Children's; New edition (February 24, 2015)
- The Frog Princess Returns (2017) ISBN 978-1681191379 ~ Bloomsbury USA Children's (June 6, 2017)

=== The Wide-Awake Princess series ===
- The Wide-Awake Princess (2010) ISBN 978-1599906584 ~ Bloomsbury USA Children's; Reprint edition (January 3, 2012)
- Unlocking the Spell [aka The Princess's Promise] (2012) ISBN 978-1619631946 ~ Bloomsbury USA Children's; Reprint edition (April 1, 2014)
- The Bravest Princess (2014) ISBN 978-1619635708 ~ Bloomsbury USA Children's; Reprint edition (February 24, 2015)
- Princess in Disguise (2015) ISBN 978-1619639348 ~ Bloomsbury USA Children's; Reprint edition (April 5, 2016)
- Princess Between Worlds (2016) ISBN 978-1681192796 ~ Bloomsbury USA Children's; Reprint edition (March 21, 2017)
- The Princess and the Pearl (2017) ISBN 978-1681196121 ~ Bloomsbury USA Children's; Reprint edition (March 20, 2018)
- Princess Before Dawn (2018) ISBN 978-1681196732 ~ Bloomsbury USA Children's (March 20, 2018)

=== The Fairy-Tale Matchmaker series ===
- The Fairy-Tale Matchmaker (2014) ISBN 978-1619638006 ~ Bloomsbury USA Children's; Reprint edition (October 6, 2015)
- The Perfect Match (2015) ISBN 978-1681191478 ~ Bloomsbury USA Children's; Reprint edition (October 11, 2016)
- The Truest Heart (2016) ISBN 978-1681195742 ~ Bloomsbury USA Children's; Reprint edition (October 10, 2017)
- The Magical Match (2017) ISBN 978-1681198828 ~ Bloomsbury Children's Books; Reprint edition (October 16, 2018)

=== Fairy Wings series ===
- Fairy Wings [originally titled Wings: A Fairy Tale] (2008) ISBN 978-1599907567 ~ Bloomsbury USA Children's; 1 edition (February 14, 2012)
- Fairy Lies (2012) ISBN 978-1619630352 ~ Bloomsbury USA Children's; Reprint edition (August 6, 2013)

=== Magical Animal Rescue series ===
- Maggie and the Flying Horse (2017) ISBN 978-1681191416 ~ Bloomsbury USA Children's (April 11, 2017)
- Maggie and the Wish Fish (2017) ISBN 978-1681191430 ~ Bloomsbury USA Children's (April 11, 2017)
- Maggie and the Unicorn (2017) ISBN 978-1681194882 ~ Bloomsbury USA Children's (October 3, 2017)
- Maggie and the Flying Pigs (2017) ISBN 978-1681194851 ~ Bloomsbury USA Children's (October 3, 2017)

=== Other books ===
- A Question of Magic (2013) ISBN 978-1619634374 ~ Bloomsbury USA Children's; Reprint edition (August 4, 2015)
