= 3LW discography =

- Studio albums: 3
- Soundtrack albums: 8
- Singles: 7
- Music videos: 7

This is the discography and music video information of American R&B girl group 3LW. Throughout their career, 3LW sold over 2.5 million records.

== Albums ==
=== Studio albums ===
List of albums, with selected chart positions
Title	Album details	Peak chart positions			Certifications
Title	Album details	US	US R&B	UK	Certifications
3LW	Released: December 5, 2000; Label: Epic; Formats: CD, digital download	29	19	75	RIAA: Platinum
A Girl Can Mack	Released: October 22, 2002; Label: Epic; Formats: CD, digital download	15	12	—	
Naughty or Nice	Released: December 10, 2002; Label: Epic; Formats: CD, digital download	—	—	—	
"—" denotes a title that did not chart, or was not released in that territory.

=== Compilation albums ===
Title	Details
Neva Get Enuf	Released: July 26, 2005; Label: BMG Special Products

== Singles ==
=== As lead artist ===
List of singles, with selected chart positions
Title	Year	Peak chart positions									Certifications	Album
Title	Year	US	US R&B	AUS	CAN	IRE	NDL	NZ	SCO	UK	Certifications	Album
"No More (Baby I'ma Do Right)"	2000	23	22	26	26	22	58	5	14	6	ARIA: Gold; RMNZ: Gold	3LW
"Playas Gon' Play"	2001	81	56	66	—	46	—	36	45	21		3LW
"I Do (Wanna Get Close to You)" (featuring Loon)	2002	58	50	41	—	—	—	13	—	—		A Girl Can Mack
"Neva Get Enuf" (featuring Lil Wayne)	2002	—	—	—	—	—	—	—	—	—		A Girl Can Mack
"I Need That (I Want That)" (featuring Lil' Kim)	2003	—	—	—	—	—	—	—	—	—		A Girl Can Mack
"Feelin' You" (featuring Jermaine Dupri)	2006	—	—	—	—	—	—	—	—	—		Non-album single
"—" denotes a title that did not chart, or was not released in that territory.

=== As featured artist ===
List of singles, with selected chart positions
Title	Year	Peak chart positions						Album
Title	Year	US	US R&B	AUS	NZ	SCO	UK	Album
"Parents Just Don't Understand" (with Lil Romeo and Nick Cannon)	2001	—	—	—	—	—	—	Jimmy Neutron: Boy Genius
"Feels Good (Don't Worry Bout a Thing)" (Naughty by Nature featuring 3LW)	2002	53	25	34	19	97	44	IIcons
"Get Up N Get It" (Bone Thugs-n-Harmony featuring 3LW and Felecia)	2002	—	63	—	—	—	—	Thug World Order
"—" denotes a title that did not chart, or was not released in that territory.

=== Promotional singles ===
Title	Year	Notes
"Trouble"	2022	Previously unreleased songs recorded in 2003–2004
"After This"	2022	Previously unreleased songs recorded in 2003–2004
"How U Gonna Act" (featuring Penelope Magnet)	2022	Previously unreleased songs recorded in 2003–2004

== Guest appearances ==
Title	Year	Other artist(s)	Album
"'Til I Say So"	2000	—N/a	Bring It On
"Never Let Go"	2001	—N/a	Down to Earth
"Not This Time"	2002	—N/a	Taina
"Could've Been You"	2002	—N/a	Barbershop
"More Than Friends"	2003	—N/a	Deliver Us from Eva
"Hate 2 Luv U"	2003	—N/a	Love Don't Cost a Thing
"Can I Talk To U"	2003	DJ Envy	The Desert Storm Mixtape: Blok Party, Vol. 1
"'On The Weekend"	2004	Morgan Smith	Barbershop 2
"The One"	2005	Frankie J	The One
"'Bout It"	2006	Yung Joc	Step Up

== DVDs ==
List of DVDs
Title	Year
3LW: Live on Sunset	2002

== Music videos ==
List of music videos
Title	Year	Director
"No More (Baby I'ma Do Right)"	2000	Chris Robinson
"Playas Gon' Play"	2001	Darren Grant
"Parents Just Don't Understand"	2001	Jessy Terrero
"Feels Good (Don't Worry Bout a Thing)"	2002	Noble Jones
"I Do (Wanna Get Close to You)"	2002	Chris Applebaum
"Neva Get Enuf"	2002	Eric White
"Feelin' You"	2006	Bille Woodruff
