= Taina (TV series) =

American television sitcom (2001–2002)

- Genre: Teen sitcom
- Created by: Maria Perez-Brown
- Starring: Christina Vidal; Khaliah Adams; Chris Knowings; David Oliver Cohen; LaTangela
- Opening theme: "Gonna Be a Star", performed by Christina Vidal
- Country of origin: United States
- Original language: English
- No. of seasons: 2
- No. of episodes: 26

Production
- Production locations: Nickelodeon Studios, Universal Studios Florida, Orlando, Florida (2001; season 1); Nickelodeon on Sunset, Hollywood, California (2002; season 2)
- Camera setup: Videotape; Multi-camera
- Running time: 23 minutes
- Production companies: Dorado Productions; Nickelodeon Productions

Original release
- Network: Nickelodeon
- Release: January 14, 2001 – May 11, 2002

Taina is an American teen sitcom created by Maria Perez-Brown and starring Christina Vidal. It aired on Nickelodeon from January 14, 2001, until May 11, 2002. Originally taped at Nickelodeon Studios in Orlando, Florida, it was the last sitcom filmed at the studio before moving to Nickelodeon on Sunset for its second season.

== Premise ==
Taina Morales is a young Puerto Rican teenager who aspires to become a singer and actress. She and her best friend Renee Jones attend the Manhattan High School of the Performing Arts, where they reunite with Lamar, whom they have not seen since elementary school. The girls' nemesis Maritza Hogg, who knew them before high school, also attends the performing-arts school and hopes to be a singer/actress. Every episode features Taina daydreaming of eventual superstardom and occasionally performing a new song.

== Cast and characters ==
=== Main ===
- Christina Vidal as Taina Maria Morales, a young girl who dreams of becoming a professional singer and actress. She attends a performing arts school with her best friend Renée, rival Maritza, and friends Daniel and Lamar. She and her friends often get themselves into crazy situations in their search for stardom. Though Taina's impatience and impulsiveness occasionally get her into scraps, her honesty and compassion get her out. The name Taina is the female form of the name of the indigenous Puerto Rican people, the Tainos.
- Khaliah Adams as Renée Aretha Jones, Taina's best friend. She is an aspiring comedienne and rapper. A boy-crazy girl, she often helps to ground Taina when her imagination runs away with her. Renée also tends to chase after boys frequently; unfortunately, her love interests aren't the right ones for her.
- Chris Knowings as Lamar Carlos Johnson, Taina's friend and an aspiring director and writer. Not only does he serve as an editor of the performing art school's newspaper, he also has a crush on Taina and awaits the day she might finally come around. His best friend is Daniel, and the two often join forces to make a quick buck. He serves as a support for Taina and the others, often offering level-headed advice.
- David Oliver Cohen as Daniel Nathaniel McDaniel, a multi-instrumentalist, who also shares the same school locker with Taina. Handsome and opinionated, his loves include writing songs, playing other instruments, and chasing after girls. Daniel prides himself on being quite the ladies' man but often ends up scorned. It's hinted that he had true feelings for Renée. He loves The Beatles, and usually accompanied Taina's songs on his guitar.
- LaTangela Newsome as Maritza Hogg, Taina and Renée's rival. She also aspires to be an actress and singer but tends to be more ruthless than Taina. She liked to upstage others in her quest to become a star. However, she isn't all bad, and sometimes joins forces with Taina and her friends to make money or fight other rivals. She prides herself on being an "evil diva".

=== Recurring ===
- Lisa Lisa as Gloria Elena Morales
- Cristina Saralegui as Principal Rojas
- Josh Cruze as Eduardo Morales
- Manolo Villaverde as Gregorio "Abuelo" Sanchez
- Brandon Iglesias as Santito Morales (season 1)
- Selenis Leyva as Titi Rosa
- Joseph Bertot as Hector Colon
- Ruben Rabasa as Papito
- Jacob Urrutia as Santito Morales (season 2)

== Development and production ==
The show premiered on January 14, 2001, on Nickelodeon. New episodes aired on the TEENick block at launch on March 4, 2001, starting with its eighth episode. Taina was scheduled to air every Sunday at 6 pm. In July 2002, Nickelodeon canceled Taina after two seasons. According to Vidal, the show was replaced with Romeo!.

== Episodes ==
=== Series overview ===
Season	Episodes	Originally released	
Season	Episodes	First released	Last released
1	13	January 14, 2001	April 22, 2001
2	13	January 19, 2002	May 11, 2002

=== Season 1 (2001) ===
No. overall	No. in season	Title	Directed by	Written by	Original release date	Prod. code
1	1	"Be Careful What You Wish For"	Carl Lauten	Fracaswell Hyman	January 14, 2001	101
Taina Morales, an aspiring entertainer, begins her first day at Manhattan School for The Arts, but when her drama teacher, Mr. Colon, calls her out on her overacting, she starts to doubt her acting ability. Lamar is convinced that Daniel is a jinx, then he's forced to take an all-female ballet class. Guest star: Cristina Saralegui as Principal Rojas (can be heard on the intercom).
2	2	"Blue Mascara"	Kim Fields	Tracy Grandstaff	January 21, 2001	104
Taina is asked to join the senior girl group Blue Mascara (3LW). However, the group discourages her from continuing to hang out with Renee, feeling that she will interfere with the group's career pursuits. Meanwhile, Daniel loses a bet to Lamar and must join the school's losing basketball team. Taina ultimately decides that her friendship with Renee is more important than being in Blue Mascara and quits the group. Gia (Adrienne Bailon), Lia (Kiely Williams), and Ria (Naturi Naughton) go on to perform "No More (Baby I'ma Do Right)" without Taina, and Maritza tries to take her place in the group. Guest stars: 3LW
3	3	"Quinceañero"	Kim Fields	Fracaswell Hyman and Maria Perez-Brown	January 28, 2001	109
Taina and Gloria disagree on what dress she should wear for her Quinceañero, her 15th birthday party; Lamar competes with Alex (Nick Cannon), Maritza's boyfriend who appears to have feelings for Taina. Guest stars: C-Note, Nick Cannon
4	4	"Mega Funds"	Beth McCarthy	Anthony Hill	February 4, 2001	108
Taina is forced to find her own way to get money to go on an amusement-park trip to see singer Joe perform, after her parents refuse to giver her the money. After winning a cash prize in a radio contest, Taina spends almost all of the money on an expensive pair of shoes instead of on the trip. Lamar and Daniel win the chance to be radio DJs for a week at Papito's, but Lamar's ego goes to his head, ruining the experience for them both.
5	5	"En Español"	Carl Lauten	Fracaswell Hyman	February 11, 2001	102
When Taina gets a bad grade on a Spanish exam, Abuelo Gregorio goes overboard immersing the family in their Puerto Rican heritage. Lamar helps Taina write a love letter to Papito's nephew, who only speaks Spanish. A weird goth girl, Ice, falls in love with Lamar.
6	6	"Charmed Bracelet"	Carl Lauten	Tracy Grandstaff	February 18, 2001	107
After buying a cheap bracelet and being told that her great-grandmother was psychic, Taina is convinced that she is also psychic. Daniel and Lamar are so obsessed with a skiing video game at Papito's that they refuse to take showers.
7	7	"I Want It That Way"	Kim Fields	Nicole Jefferson	February 25, 2001	105
A short play that Taina wrote is chosen for a showcase which she must also direct. The task becomes overwhelming when her actresses Renee and Maritza, her musician Daniel, and her assistant-director Lamar all want to do their own thing. Guest star: Cristina Saralegui as Principal Rojas
8	8	"A Twitch in the Tail"	Rick Fernandes	Fracaswell Hyman	March 4, 2001	113
Taina auditions for a soap opera but Santito, who accompanied her, gets the role. Beatrice (Benita Robledo), whom Daniel had a crush on back in band camp, moves to town and falls for Lamar.
9	9	"Big Break"	Chuck Vinson	Anthony Hill	March 11, 2001	103
Taina is desperate to be cast as Robert De Niro's daughter in a movie. Daniel and Lamar get jobs to buy a used computer program to make their movies. Taina's Titi Carmen visits, causes tension with Abuelo Gregorio.
10	10	"Friend or Phone"	Chuck Vinson	Anthony Hill	April 1, 2001	106
Taina wants a new cell phone after hers malfunctions. When Titi Rosa buys her a new phone, she sells her old one to Renee; when it finally breaks down for good, Renee asks for her money back, causing a rift in their relationship. Daniel and Lamar try to bribe Maritza for Knicks-Lakers tickets.
11	11	"Singing with the Enemy"	Kim Fields	Anthony Hill	April 8, 2001	111
Taina, Renee, and Maritza must team up to perform for a talent show or get a failing grade in drama class. Taina has difficulty telling Renee that she can't sing. Daniel has writer's block and turns secret, embarrassing stories from Lamar and Taina into songs.
12	12	"Undercover"	Kim Fields	Tracy Grandstaff	April 15, 2001	112
Taina suspects that Alex of the group MDO is a fraud. Guest stars: MDO
13	13	"My Left Eye"	Rick Fernandes	Fracaswell Hyman	April 22, 2001	110
Taina is selected to record a song with a popular artist and must go on tour for a year; she faces a tough decision on whether or not to go.

=== Season 2 (2002) ===
No. overall	No. in season	Title	Directed by	Written by	Original release date	Prod. code
14	1	"Crouching Actor, Hidden Chicken"	Richard A. Fernandes	Fracaswell Hyman	January 19, 2002	15
Taina acts like a tough girl to snag a role in a boxing movie; Daniel and Renee build a robot for a robot-fighting competition.
15	2	"Sabotage"	Chuck Vinson	Tracy Grandstaff	January 26, 2002	14
Taina and Maritza join forces to take down Lizzie (Brooke Allison), a southern girl who sabotaged her way to the lead role in the school musical; Renee develops romantic feelings for Daniel. Guest star: Brooke Allison
16	3	"Scary Legend"	Richard A. Fernandes	Anthony Hill	February 2, 2002	17
A scary story Mr. Colon told spooks Taina and the gang; while staying at school at night for costume fittings, Taina and Renee make a bet with Lamar and Daniel to see who can last longest there without being scared.
17	4	"Test Friends"	Virgil L. Fabian	Wayne Conley	February 9, 2002	20
Taina and Renee take a magazine quiz on their friendship and find out they hardly know anything about each other; Lamar, Daniel, and Maritza must work at Papito's to pay for a display-case glass they broke.
18	5	"Papi Don't Preach"	Fracaswell Hyman	Fracaswell Hyman	February 23, 2002	23
Eduardo questions Taina about whether she attended an all-night party after he told her not to, and Taina vehemently says she didn't go; Lamar and Daniel get jobs at a movie theater and promise they will sneak Taina and Renee into the film premiere starring Teck Money of The Real World. Guest star: Nick Cannon as LaTanya (of All That and The Nick Cannon Show)
19	6	"The Big Show"	Kim Fields	Luisa Leschin	March 2, 2002	21
Taina tries to audition for the lead in the new school play directed by Shevchenko (Liz Torres), a once-prestigious theater director, but she must overcome the long-standing rule that only seniors can audition for lead roles in school plays. Lamar and Daniel sell tickets to the play with extreme measures, and Renee and Maritza compete for the affection of Darius, the play's senior male lead. Guest star: Jaci Velasquez as Yvette
20	7	"Crushin’"	Joe Menendez	Rodney Stringfellow	March 9, 2002	24
Taina discovers that the guy she's crushing on is younger than she thought; Lamar gets jealous when Renee and Daniel share interest in sumo-wrestling.
21	8	"Abuelo Knows Best"	Maria Perez-Brown	Maria Perez-Brown	March 16, 2002	16
Abuelo Gregorio spends more time with Taina but starts to cramp her style; Maritza wants to write her own songs and asks Lamar and Daniel for help. Guest stars: Luis Fonsi and Shakira
22	9	"Bad Review"	Melissa Joan Hart	Tracy Grandstaff	March 23, 2002	26
Taina gets a bad review of a play from Lamar, which has her reevaluating her performance. Daniel invites Maritza as his plus-one for an opera show in exchange for Maritza promising to give him a guitar signed by all four Beatles, but her fashion advice drives him crazy. Guest stars: Solange Knowles as Rachel and Dorothy Lyman as Ms. Harper
23	10	"Desperately Seeking Agent"	Kim Fields	Tracy Grandstaff	April 6, 2002	18
Taina is willing to go through many extremes to be signed by an agent; Daniel, caught in a lie by his dad, blames Lamar for not cooperating with him on hiding the truth. Guest stars: Carlos Alazraqui as Stan LaBlan and Melanie Chartoff as Sasha Simmons
24	11	"Starstruck"	Loretha Jones	Jim Hecht	April 13, 2002	22
When actress Nicole Burke (Kelly Rowland) starts at Manhattan School for the Arts, everyone believes that she is as evil as the character she plays on her popular teen soap and only Taina gives her a chance. On Mr. Colon's orders, Renee and Lamar pretend to be mother and son outside of class to bring better performances out of them for an emotional scene. Guest star: Kelly Rowland
25	12	"The Fear Factors"	Chuck Vinson	Fracaswell Hyman	May 4, 2002	25
Taina's old friend Lisa shows up to the Manhattan School for the Arts to audition for the lead in the school musical and asks Taina to help keep secret that she isn't a registered student. Lamar asks retired wrestler Gladys Goldfinger (Roma Maffia) to help him perform better in his stage combat class in exchange for teaching her how to cry to fulfill her acting dreams; when her elderly piano player dies, Maritza asks Daniel to be her new one. Guest star: Tina Landon as Jackie
26	13	"Beyond The Music"	Kim Fields	Fracaswell Hyman	May 11, 2002	19
Lamar shows the drama class his Behind the Music-style documentary looking back on the short-lived group made up of Taina, Renee, Daniel, and Maritza. Guest stars: Dream and Lil' Romeo

== Home releases ==
The series has seen no DVD releases in North America, however a single-release VHS/DVD was released by Maverick Entertainment in the United Kingdom in March 2004 named "Be Careful What You Wish For"', which features the first four aired episodes.

=== Current availability ===
As of June 2022, the original series is not available to stream on Paramount+ in the United States (though available in Spanish in Latin America), where many of its Nickelodeon counterparts can be streamed. The series is, however, available on the Paramount Streaming service Pluto TV as a Spanish-dubbed program. Despite these developments, YouTube remains the only means of viewing the program in its original English language.

== Soundtrack ==
Taina: Original Television Soundtrack was released on February 19, 2002, by Nick Records and distributed through Jive Records/Zomba Recording Corporation and MTV Networks. The album contains songs featured in the show's second season, and none from the first season, with the exception of "Gonna Be A Star", the show's theme. The album primarily features the show's stars, Christina Vidal and LaTangela (who are credited as their characters), with two additional songs performed by girl groups 3LW and Dream, both of which made guest appearances during the show's first season.

Taina: Original Television Soundtrack – CD
No.	Title	Writer(s)	Vocals	Length
1.	"Gonna Be A Star"	Fracaswell Hyman; Maria Perez-Brown; Chuck Giscombe	Christina Vidal	3:01
2.	"Carnival"	Martin Bushell; Nicky Alan Cook; Phil Dane	Christina Vidal	3:02
3.	"I Represent"	Nate Butler; Brian Kierulf; Joshua M. Schwartz	LaTangela	3:02
4.	"Feel Good"	Full Force	Christina Vidal	3:33
5.	"Not While I'm Around"	Kevin Paige; Lindy Robbins	LaTangela	3:47
6.	"Not This Time"	Chrissy Conway; Joe Priolo; Errol Johnson	3LW	3:20
7.	"I'm In Love With Me"	Chuck Giscombe	LaTangela	3:03
8.	"I Thought That We Were Friends"	Full Force; Jalil Hutchins; Lawrence Smith	Christina Vidal	3:14
9.	"In My Dreams"	Sean Combs; Mario Winans; Dez Dottin; Karen Johnson; Gordon Dukes; Jack Knight	Dream	4:55
10.	"Voy a Ser Una Estrella (Gonna Be a Star)"	Hyman; Perez-Brown; Giscombe	Christina Vidal	3:00

== Awards and nominations ==
- ALMA Awards

2002 – Outstanding Children's Television Programming (Won)
2002 – Outstanding Actress in a Television Series – Christina Vidal (Nominated)
2002 – Outstanding Script for a Television Drama or Comedy – Fracaswell Hyman & Maria Perez-Brown for episode "Quinceanero"(Nominated)

== See also ==
Victorious (TV Series)- Another Nickelodeon sitcom about a girl who attends a performing arts high school with aspirations to be a singer
