= Shake It Off =

2014 single by Taylor Swift

Single by Taylor Swift

from the album 1989
- Released: August 18, 2014
- Studio: MXM (Stockholm); Conway Recording (Los Angeles)
- Genre: Dance-pop
- Length: 3:39
- Label: Big Machine
- Composers: Taylor Swift; Max Martin; Shellback
- Lyricist: Taylor Swift
- Producers: Max Martin; Shellback

Taylor Swift singles chronology
"The Last Time" (2013)	"Shake It Off" (2014)	"Blank Space" (2014)

Music video
- "Shake It Off" on YouTube

"Shake It Off" is a song by the American singer-songwriter Taylor Swift and the lead single from her fifth studio album, 1989 (2014). She wrote the lyrics by herself and composed the melody with the song's producers, Max Martin and Shellback. The lyrics express Swift's disinterest in her detractors' negative remarks, inspired by her experience with media scrutiny. An uptempo dance-pop song, "Shake It Off" features a looping drum beat, a Mellotron-based saxophone line, and a handclap-accented bridge. Big Machine Records released it on August 18, 2014, to promote 1989 as Swift's first pop album after her previous country-oriented image and sound.

Initial reviews mostly praised the production as catchy, but some criticized the lyrics as weak and shallow. Retrospectively, critics have considered "Shake It Off" an effective opener for 1989, transforming Swift's status to that of a pop star. NME and Consequence ranked it among their best songs of the 2010s decade. The single reached the top 10 and was certified multi-platinum in Australia, Austria, Canada, Denmark, Italy, Japan, New Zealand, Norway, Spain, and the UK. In the US, the single spent four weeks atop the Billboard Hot 100 and was certified diamond by the Recording Industry Association of America.

Mark Romanek directed the music video for "Shake It Off", which portrays Swift as a clumsy person unsuccessfully attempting several dance moves. Some critics accused the video of cultural appropriation for featuring dances associated with people of color such as twerking. Swift performed the song on the 1989 World Tour (2015), the Reputation Stadium Tour (2018), and the Eras Tour (2023–2024). "Shake It Off" received several awards and nominations, including three nominations at the 2015 Grammy Awards for Record of the Year, Song of the Year, and Best Pop Solo Performance. Following a 2019 dispute regarding the ownership of her back catalog, Swift re-recorded the song as "Shake It Off (Taylor's Version)" for her re-recorded album 1989 (Taylor's Version) (2023).

== Background and production ==
The American singer-songwriter Taylor Swift had identified as a country musician until her fourth studio album, Red (2012), which incorporated eclectic styles of pop and rock. Although the album was promoted by Swift and Big Machine Records as country music, its diverse musical styles sparked a media debate over Swift's status in country. She was inspired by 1980s synth-pop to create her fifth studio album, 1989, as her "first official pop" record, naming it after her birth year.

Swift enlisted the Swedish producer Max Martin as co-executive producer of 1989. For the album's standard edition, Martin and his frequent collaborator Shellback produced 7 out of 13 tracks, including "Shake It Off". Swift wrote the song's lyrics and composed its melody with Martin and Shellback. According to Swift, she went into the studio with the producers without any melody and only knowing the "vibe" she wanted to have. As soon as Martin and Shellback played their instrumental, Swift conceived "Shake It Off" as an energetic song that could get "this one girl who hasn't danced all night" to get up and dance at a wedding reception.

"Shake It Off" was one of the two last songs (the other being "Style") produced for 1989. The track was recorded by Sam Holland at Conway Recording Studios in Los Angeles, and by Michael Ilbert at MXM Studios in Stockholm. It was mixed by Serban Ghenea at MixStar Studios in Virginia Beach, Virginia, and mastered by Tom Coyne at Sterling Sound in New York City.

== Lyrics and music ==
Swift was inspired to write "Shake It Off" by the media scrutiny on her image that she had experienced throughout her career. In an interview with Rolling Stone in August 2014, Swift said about the song's inspiration: "I've had every part of my life dissected. [...] When you live your life under that kind of scrutiny, you can either let it break you, or you can get really good at dodging punches. And when one lands, you know how to deal with it." From a songwriting point of view, Swift shared with NPR in October 2014 that she viewed "Shake It Off" as having a more mature perspective than her 2011 single "Mean", which was also inspired by her critics. Whereas "Mean" was written from a "victimized" perspective, "Shake It Off" depicted Swift in a proactive stance to "take back the narrative, and have [...] a sense of humor" about her detractors and their remarks.

In the first verse, Swift references her perceived image as a flirtatious woman with serial romantic attachments: "I go on too many dates / But I can't make 'em stay / At least that's what people say." The lines in the choruses are arranged rhythmically to produce a catchy hook: "Cause the players gonna play, play, play, play, play / And the haters gonna hate, hate, hate, hate, hate / Baby, I'm just gonna shake, shake, shake, shake, shake." The bridge opens with Swift asserting that, among the "dirty cheats of the world, you could have been getting down to this sick beat", and sarcastically mentions her ex-lovers; the lyric "this sick beat" is trademarked to Swift by the U.S. Patent and Trademark Office.

"Shake It Off"
Featuring a Mellotron-based saxophone line, "Shake It Off" is an uptempo dance-pop song in which Swift expresses disinterest in her detractors' negative remarks, inspired by her experience with media scrutiny.

At 3 minutes and 39 seconds long, "Shake It Off" is composed in G mixolydian – the fifth mode of the C major scale. It follows a ii–IV–I chord progression (Am–C–G) and employs the verse–chorus form, beginning with a loose verse, tightening for the prechorus, and loosening again for the chorus. Set over a tempo of 160 beats per minute, the track is a dance-pop song with an uptempo production. Using minimalist instruments, it begins with a stomping drum-and-clap pattern, created by Martin and Shellback banging their feet on a wooden floor.

The beat is looped throughout the song, as is the synthesized staccato saxophone line. Shellback used a brass preset on the Mellotron to play the said saxophone sound; he said he "started playing something bad on purpose" but Martin was immediately enthusiastic. The saxophonist Jonas Thander added to this by creating his own instrumental lines to complement Shellback's part. Thander recorded his alto and tenor saxophones at his home studio in Sweden, and it took him one whole night and the next day to edit together all the saxophone parts from multiple players. The choruses incorporate a syncopated brass trio of saxophone, trumpet, and trombone, and layers of backing vocal harmonies echoing Swift's lead vocals. The bridge, accentuated by hand claps and running from 2:18 to 2:42, features Swift's spoken word delivery.

== Release ==
On August 18, 2014, during a live streaming event held on Yahoo and sponsored by ABC News, Swift announced 1989 and its lead single "Shake It Off", and premiered its music video. Within minutes of the video's release, Big Machine, in partnership with Republic Records, released the song to contemporary hit radio and adult contemporary radio in the US. "Shake It Off" was made available for download by Big Machine on August 19, and a limited CD single edition was available via Swift's website on September 11. In Europe, Universal Music Group released "Shake It Off" to Italian radio on August 29, and as a CD single in Germany on October 10; while Big Machine, in partnership with Mercury Records, released it as a single in the UK on October 13, 2014.

The release of "Shake It Off" received extensive media attention, given Swift's abandonment of country music to reinvent her artistry as pop. The magazine Drowned in Sound described the single as "undoubtedly ... the most significant cultural event" since Radiohead's 2011 album The King of Limbs, while country radio stations and the Country Music Association received the song with surprise and confusion. Writing for Billboard, Jason Lipshutz contended that while "Shake It Off" was not Swift's first "straight-up" pop song, by explicitly naming it so, it was her "bold foray into the unknown" where she could distance herself from the limitations of the country pop sound that had defined her music.

== Critical reception ==
"Shake It Off" received mixed reviews upon release. Although positive reviews found the production catchy, critics deemed the track repetitive and lacking substance compared to Swift's works on Red. Randall Roberts from the Los Angeles Times's lauded the sound as "perfect pop confection" but found the lyrics shallow, calling them insensible to the political events at the time: "When lives are at stake and nothing seems more relevant than getting to the Actual Truth, liars and cheats can't and shouldn't be shaken off." In congruence, The Guardian's Molly Fitzpatrick wrote that the lyrics fell short of Swift's songwriting abilities.

Giving the song a three-out-of-five-stars score, Jeff Terich from American Songwriter regarded Swift's new direction as "a left-turn worth following". While Terich agreed that the lyrics were dismissive, he felt that critics should not have taken the song seriously because it was "pretty harmless". In a positive review, Jason Lipshutz from Billboard wrote: "Swift proves why she belongs among pop's queen bees ... the song sounds like a surefire hit." In a review of the album 1989, Alexis Petridis praised the lyrics for "twisting clichés until they sound original". In the words of Andrew Unterberger from Spin, while "Shake It Off" was musically a "red herring" that feels out of place on the album, it thematically represents Swift's new attitude on 1989, where she liberated herself from overtly romantic struggles to embrace positivity. Swift herself acknowledged the song as an outlier on 1989, and she deliberately released it as the lead single to encourage audiences to explore the entire album and not just the singles.

Retrospectively, Hannah Mylrea from NME considered "Shake It Off" an effective opener for Swift's 1989 era, which transformed her image to mainstream pop. While saying that "Shake It Off" was not one of the album's better songs, Rob Sheffield from Rolling Stone applauded it for "serving as a trailer to announce her daring Eighties synth-pop makeover". Nate Jones from Vulture agreed, but he described the song's bridge as "the worst 24 seconds of the entire album". In his 2019 ranking of Swift's singles, Petridis ranked "Shake It Off" third—behind "Blank Space" (2014) and "Love Story" (2008), lauding its "irresistible" hook and "sharp-tongued wit". Jane Song from Paste was less enthusiastic, placing "Shake It Off" among Swift's worst songs in her catalog: "Swift has a pattern of choosing the worst song from each album as the lead single."

== Commercial performance ==
"Shake It Off" gained an audience of nine million on US airplay after one day of release to radio and debuted at number 45 on Radio Songs after two days of release. After its first week of release, the single debuted at number nine on Adult Pop Songs and number 12 on Pop Songs, setting the record for the highest debut on both charts. On the Pop Songs chart, it tied with Mariah Carey's "Dreamlover" (1993) for the highest first-week chart entry. Although not officially released to country radio, the single debuted and peaked at number 58 on Country Airplay.

"Shake It Off" debuted at number one on the US Billboard Hot 100 chart dated September 6, 2014, becoming the 22nd song to do so and Swift's second number-one single. After two consecutive weeks at number one, it dropped to number two, where it stayed for eight consecutive weeks. "Shake It Off" returned to number one in its tenth charting week, and spent a further week at number one, totaling four non-consecutive weeks atop the Hot 100. It also topped Billboard airplay-focused charts including Pop Songs, Adult Pop Songs, and Adult Contemporary. "Shake It Off" was one of the best-selling singles of the 2010s decade in the US, selling 5.4 million digital copies as of January 2020. As of December 2024, the single remains Swift's biggest hit on the Hot 100, where it spent nearly six months in the top 10 and 50 weeks in the top 100. The song was certified diamond by the Recording Industry Association of America, which denotes 10 million units based on sales and streams. With this achievement, Swift is the first female artist to have both a song and an album (Fearless) certified diamond in the US.

"Shake It Off" topped the charts and has received multi-platinum certifications in Australia (19-times platinum), New Zealand (seven-times platinum), and Canada (six-times platinum). In the UK, it peaked at number two on the Singles Chart and, by November 2022, became the first song since 2020 to surpass one million in pure sales. It was certified six-times platinum by the British Phonographic Industry to become Swift's best-selling single in the UK as of July 2026. In Japan, "Shake It Off" peaked at number four on the Japan Hot 100 and was certified triple platinum. The single also topped charts in Hungary and Poland, and it was a top-five hit in other European countries, peaking at number two in Spain; number three in Ireland, Norway, and Sweden; number four in Denmark; and number five in Germany and the Netherlands. It was certified triple-diamond in Brazil; and double-platinum in Austria, Italy, Norway, and Spain.

== Music video ==
=== Concept ===
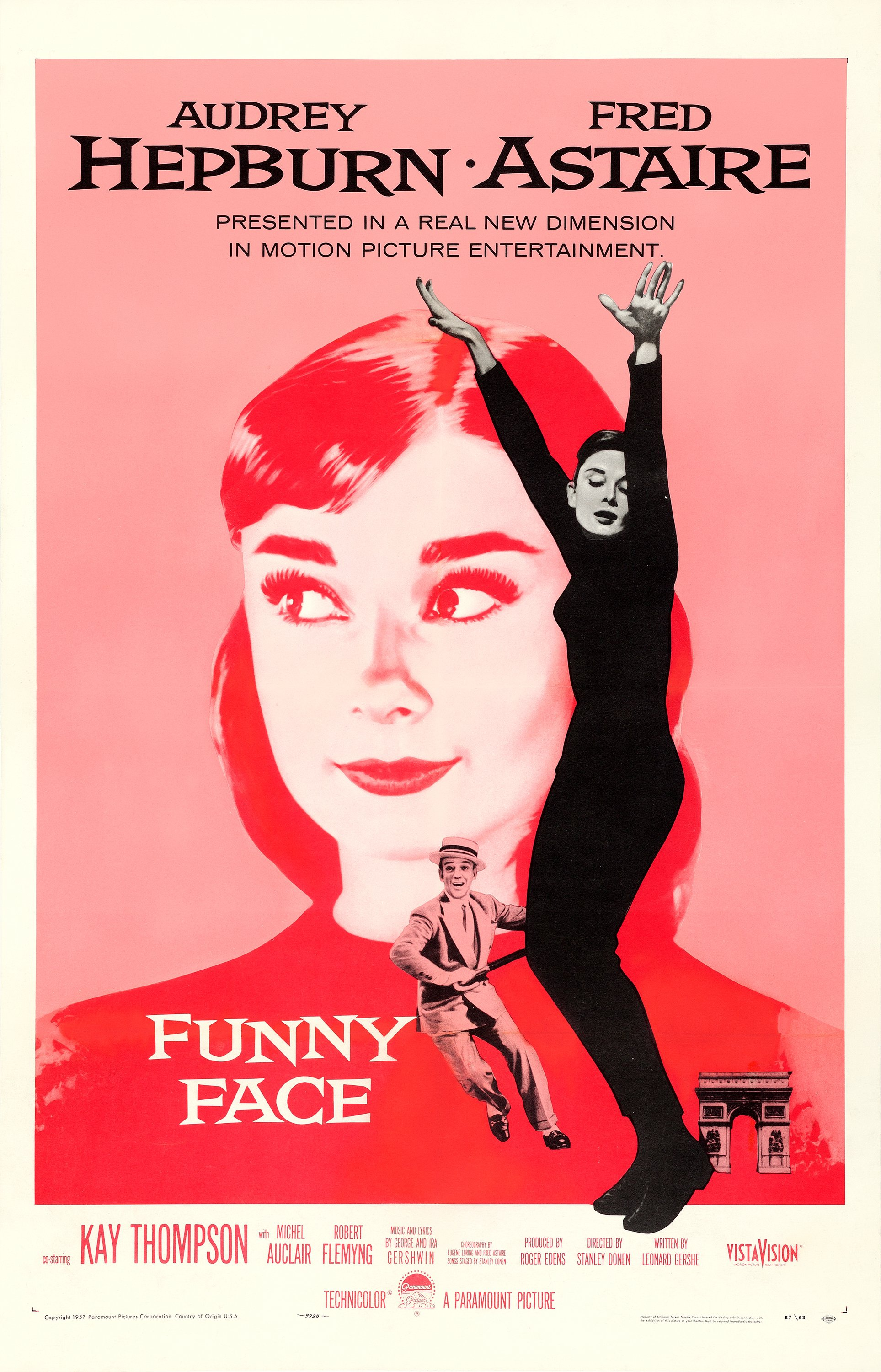
Swift's black turtleneck and jeans in "Shake It Off" (left) drew comparisons to Audrey Hepburn's outfit in the 1957 film Funny Face (right).

The music video for "Shake It Off", directed by Mark Romanek, was released on August 18, 2014, the same day as the song's release. It was shot over three days in June 2014 in Los Angeles. Swift conceived the video as a humorous depiction of her trying to find her identity: "It takes a long time to figure out who you are and where you fit in in the world." To this end, the video depicts Swift as a clumsy person who unsuccessfully attempts dance moves with professional artists, including ballerinas, street dancers, cheerleaders, rhythmic gymnasts and performance artists. She summed up the video: "I'm putting myself in all these awkward situations where the dancers are incredible, and I'm having fun with it, but not fitting in ... I'm being embarrassingly bad at it. It shows you to keep doing you, keep being you, keep trying to figure out where you fit in in the world, and eventually you will."

The dances were choreographed by Tyce Diorio. The final scenes feature Swift dancing with her fans, whom Swift had personally selected through social media engagement. The video contains references to other popular-culture items. According to VH1, those references are: the ballerinas to the 2010 film Black Swan, the breakdancers to the 2010 film Step Up 3D, the "sparkling suits and robotic dance moves" to the electronic music duo Daft Punk, the twerking dance moves to the singer Miley Cyrus, the cheerleaders to Toni Basil's 1981 video "Mickey", and Swift's black turtleneck and jeans to the outfits of Audrey Hepburn in the 1957 film Funny Face. The Sydney Morning Herald and the Los Angeles Times also opined there were references to Lady Gaga and Skrillex.

=== Analysis and reception ===
Fitzpatrick considered Swift "a little too skilled a dancer" for the video's concept, writing: "The incongruent blend of modern dance, ballet, and breakdancing is fun, but the conceit falls flat." Peter Vincent from The Sydney Morning Herald called the video "unoriginal", citing the many popular culture references, and doubted Swift's success in transforming her image to pop. Media studies academic Maryn Wilkinson noted "Shake It Off" as a representation of Swift's "zany" persona during the 1989 era. (Note: Wilkinson used "zany" to describe Swift as "a figure who emphasises the pop 'performance' as one of hard work instead, because she exposed its construction as one that does not come 'naturally'".) According to Wilkinson, because Swift had been associated with a hardworking and authentic persona through her country songs, her venture to "artificial, manufactured" pop required intricate maneuvering to retain her sense of authenticity. In the video, after failing every dance routine, Swift laughs at herself implying that she will never "fit in" to "any commercially viable image, and prefers to embrace her natural zany state instead". Wilkinson argued that in doing so, she reminded the audience of her authenticity underneath "the artificial manufacture of pop performances".

"Shake It Off" attracted allegations of racism and cultural appropriation for perpetuating African American stereotypes such as twerking and breakdancing. Its release coinciding with the race relation debates revolving the Ferguson unrest was also met with criticism. Analyzing the video's supposedly "racializing surveillance" in a post-racial context, communications academic Rachel Dubrofsky noted the difference between Swift's depiction of conventionally white dance moves such as ballet and cheerleading and conventionally black dance moves such as breakdancing and twerking. (Note: Dubrofsky, citing Simone Browne, describes "racializing surveillance" as "a technology of social control where surveillance practices, policies, and performances concern the production of norms pertaining to race and exercise a power to define what is in or out of place.") She argued that while Swift's outfits and demeanor when she performs ballet or cheerleading fit her "naturally", she "does not easily embody the break-dancer's body nor does the style of dress [while twerking] fit her seamlessly". Dubrofsky summarized the video as Swift's statement of her white authenticity: "I'm so white, you know it, I know it, which makes it so funny when I try to dance like a person of color."

The Washington Post commented the video's depiction of dance moves associated with people of color, such as twerking, was another case of an ongoing debate about white pop singers embracing black culture. Romanek defended his work: "We simply choose styles of dance that we thought would be popular and amusing ... If you look at [the video] carefully, it's a massively inclusive piece. And ... it's a satirical piece. It's playing with a whole range of music video tropes and cliches and stereotypes."

== Accolades ==
On publications' year-end lists of the best songs of 2014, "Shake It Off" was ranked in the top 10 by Time Out (third), PopMatters (fourth), The Village Voice's Pazz & Jop critics' poll (fourth), and Consequence (eighth). The track also featured on lists by Drowned in Sound (14th), Dagsavisen (16th), and NME (27th). On 2010s decade-end lists, the single was ranked as the 19th-best song by NME and 38th-best by Consequence. USA Today listed "Shake It Off" as one of the ten songs that defined the 2010s. Time Out Riyadh ranked the song third on their list of the best pop songs of the 21st century.

In 2015, "Shake It Off" won Top Streaming Song (Video) at the Billboard Music Awards, Song of the Year at the iHeartRadio Music Awards, Favorite International Video at the Myx Music Awards in the Philippines, and Favorite Song at the People's Choice Awards. The song was honored as one of the "Ten Songs I Wish I'd Written" at the 2015 Nashville Songwriters Association International, and it was one of the "Award-Winning Songs" at the 2016 BMI Pop Awards, which honored the year's most popular songs on US television and radio.

At the 57th Annual Grammy Awards in 2015, "Shake It Off" was nominated for Record of the Year, Song of the Year, and Best Pop Solo Performance. The song also received nominations at the Kids' Choice Awards for Song of the Year, Teen Choice Awards for Choice Female Single, Rockbjörnen Awards in Sweden for Foreign Song of the Year, Radio Disney Music Awards for Song of the Year, and Los Premios 40 Principales in Spain for Best International Video.

== Live performances ==
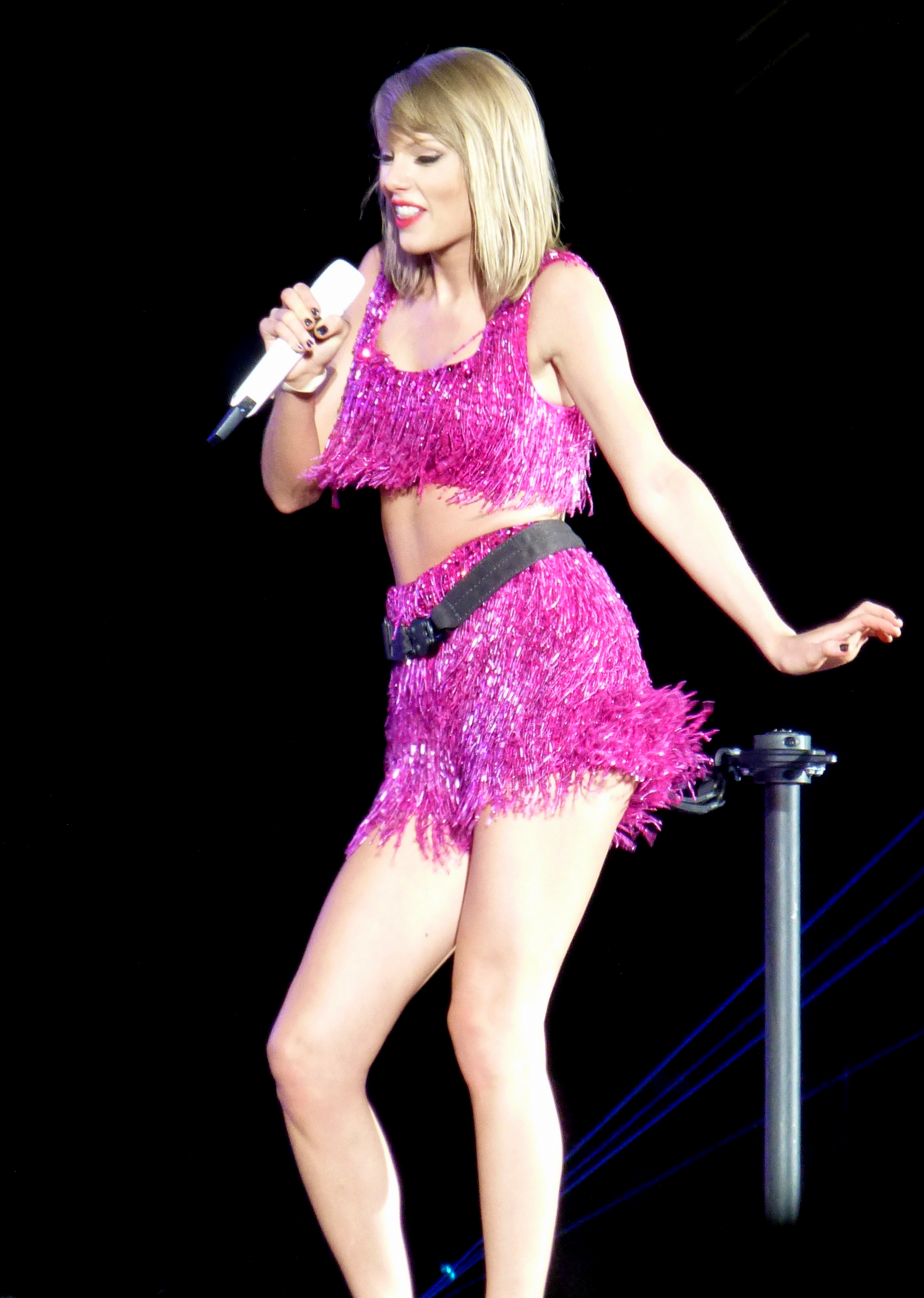
Swift performing "Shake It Off" on the 1989 World Tour (2015)

Swift premiered "Shake It Off" on television at the 2014 MTV Video Music Awards on August 24, 2014, with Kiki Wong on drums. She performed the song at the German Radio Awards on September 4. As part of promotion of 1989, she performed the song on television shows including The X Factor UK on October 12, The X Factor Australia on October 20, Jimmy Kimmel Live! on October 23, and Good Morning America on October 29. On October 27, 2014, the day of 1989's release, she performed the song as part of a mini-concert titled the "1989 Secret Sessions", live broadcast by Yahoo! and iHeartRadio. She also played "Shake It Off" on music festivals including the iHeartRadio Music Festival on September 19, the We Can Survive benefit concert at the Hollywood Bowl on October 24, and the Jingle Ball Tour 2014 on December 5. At the after party for the 40th anniversary of Saturday Night Live, Swift performed the song in an impromptu performance with Jimmy Fallon on backing vocals and Paul McCartney on backing vocals and bass guitar.

On April 23, 2019, she performed an acoustic version of the song at the Time 100 Gala, where she was honored as one of the "100 most influential" people of the year. She again performed the song on the finale of the eighth season of The Voice France on May 25, on the Wango Tango festival on June 1, at the City of Lover one-off concert in Paris on September 9, and at the We Can Survive charity concert in Los Angeles on October 19, 2019. At the 2019 American Music Awards, where she was honored as the Artist of the Decade, Swift performed "Shake It Off" as part of a medley of her hits. Halsey and Cabello joined Swift onstage during the song. She again performed the song at Capital FM's Jingle Bell Ball 2019 in London and at iHeartRadio Z100's Jingle Ball in New York City. On June 24, 2025, Swift did a surprise, impromptu performance of "Shake It Off" during a Tight End University concert in Nashville, where she played guitar and was accompanied by a band.

"Shake It Off" was included on the set lists on three of Swift's world tours—the 1989 World Tour (2015), where the song was the final number, the Reputation Stadium Tour (2018), where she performed the song with Camila Cabello and Charli XCX as supporting acts, and the Eras Tour (2023–2024).

== Controversies ==
=== 2014 Triple J Hottest 100 ===
Following a January 13, 2015, BuzzFeed article titled "Why Isn't Everyone Voting For 'Shake It Off' In The Hottest 100?", the #Tay4Hottest100 hashtag campaign on social media emerged during the voting period for the Triple J Hottest 100, an annual poll selecting the 100 most prominent songs by the Australian radio station Triple J. The social media posts tagged with #Tay4Hottest100 overwhelmed those mentioning the official contenders. The campaign led to a significant amount of media debate over the merits of Swift's inclusion in the poll. One criterion for eligibility was being played on air by Triple J at least once in 2014; Swift's "Shake It Off" did not receive airplay, but a cover of the song by the folk group Milky Chance did. Critics of the campaign argued that the Hottest 100 was a platform for up-and-rising, non-mainstream artists, but defenders criticized Triple J for embodying cultural elitism and sexism, citing how the radio prioritized "masculine 'rockist'" and "alternative" artists. Guardian Australia's Elle Hunt wrote: "[The] virulent response to #Tay4Hottest100 has revealed the persistence of a dichotomy I'd thought we'd thrown out long ago: that of high art versus low."

On January 20, 2015, Guardian Australia submitted a freedom of information request to the ABC in regard to the station's response to the campaign and the eligibility of "Shake It Off" for the Hottest 100 contest. Triple J's manager Chris Scaddan told the website Tone Deaf: "We don't comment on voting campaigns while Hottest 100 voting is open. It draws attention to them and may influence the results of the poll." "Shake It Off" was eventually disqualified by Triple J on January 26, 2015; in the announcement, Triple J acknowledged Swift's music and career but highlighted that her entry—which had not received airtime—would not reflect their spirit. They subsequently introduced two new rules that prohibited "trolling the poll"-type campaigns for the proceeding Hottest 100 polls. The communications scholar Glen Fuller described the #Tay4Hottest100 campaign as an example of "connective action" in the age of social media. As noted by Fuller, the emergence of personalized "action frames" expressing personal viewpoints intertwining with a larger framework of information created by media publications resulted in fragmented arguments that failed to result in a definite outcome.

=== Lawsuits ===
In November 2015, Jessie Braham, an R&B singer known by the stage name Jesse Graham, claimed that Swift plagiarized his 2013 song "Haters Gonna Hate", citing his lyrics: "Haters gone hate, playas gone play. Watch out for them fakers, they'll fake you everyday." In his lawsuit, he alleged that 92% of Swift's "Shake It Off" came from his song and demanded $42 million in damages from Swift and the distributor Sony. On November 12, 2015, the lawsuit was dismissed by U.S. District Court Judge Gail Standish, who ruled that Braham did not have enough factual evidence but could file a new complaint "if his lawsuit deficiencies are corrected". Standish quoted lyrics from Swift's songs "We Are Never Ever Getting Back Together", "Bad Blood", "Blank Space" and "Shake It Off".

In September 2017, the songwriters Sean "Sep" Hall and Nate Butler sued Swift for copyright infringement. They alleged that the lyrics of "Shake It Off" plagiarized those of "Playas Gon' Play" (2001), a song they wrote for the girl group 3LW, citing their lyrics: "Playas they gon' play, and haters they gonna hate / Ballers they gon' ball, shot callers they gonna call." U.S. District Judge Michael W. Fitzgerald, in February 2018, dismissed the case on the grounds that the lyrics in question were too "banal" to be copyrighted; but U.S. Circuit Judges John B. Owens, Andrew D. Hurwitz, and Kenneth K. Lee of the U.S. Court of Appeals for the Ninth Circuit, in October 2019, reversed the ruling, holding that the district court had "constituted itself as the final judge of the worth of an expressive work", and sent the case back to the district court.

Swift's legal team filed new documents for dismissal of the suit in July 2020, and in July 2021, filed for a summary judgment, arguing that the discovery phase of the lawsuit has turned up evidence in their favor. On December 9, 2021, Fitzgerald refused Swift's request for a summary judgment. Swift's legal team filed a second motion to dismiss the case on December 23, claiming the Fitzgerald's ruling was "unprecedented and cheats the public domain" if the plaintiffs could sue everyone who uses the phrases in any songwriting, singing or says it publicly. On January 14, 2022, Hall and Butler's legal team filed a response stating, "The rules simply do not provide defendants with vehicles for rehashing old arguments and are not intended to give an unhappy litigant one additional chance to sway the judge." On December 12, 2022, the lawsuit was dropped with no final verdict.

== Cover versions and usage in media ==
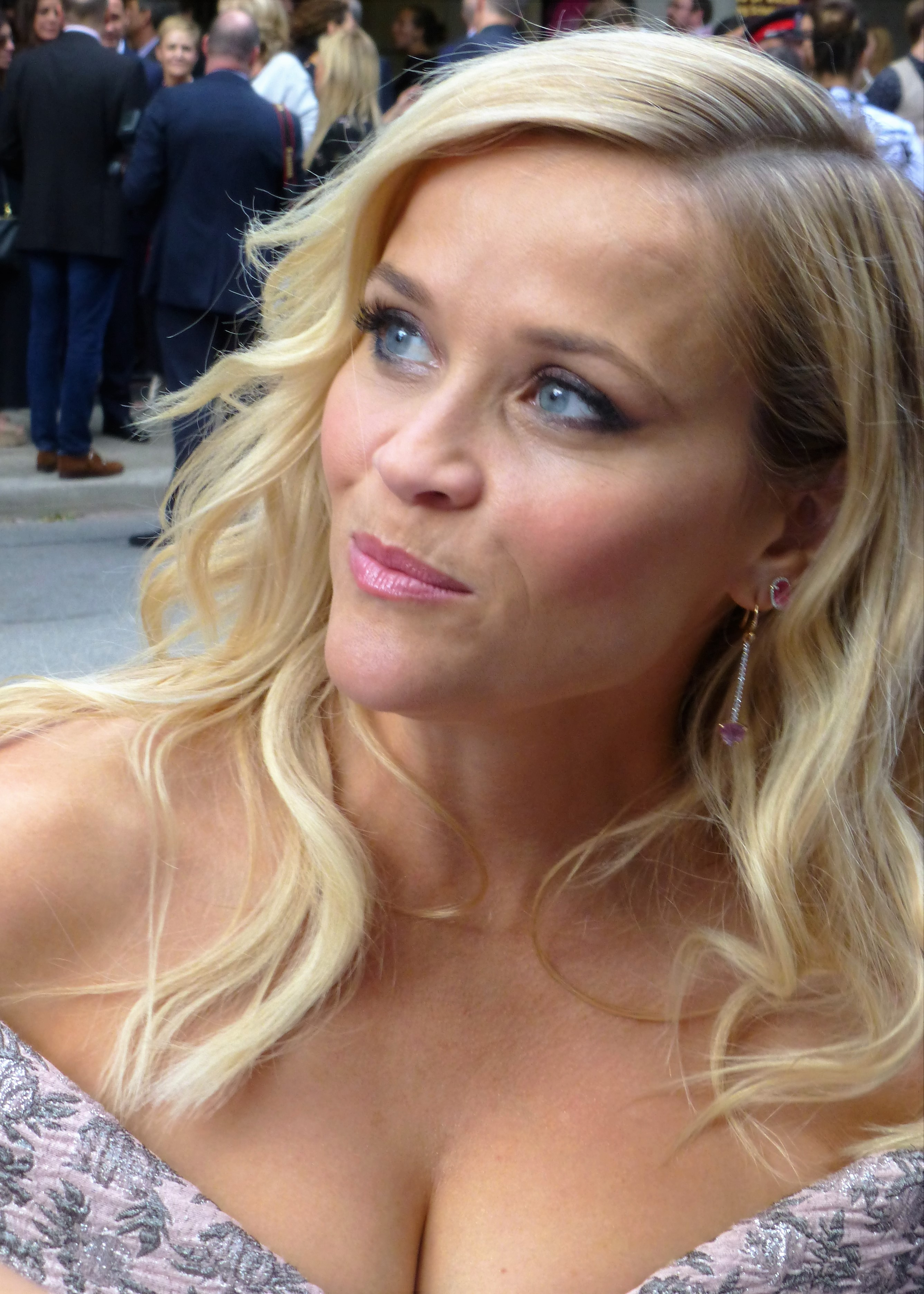
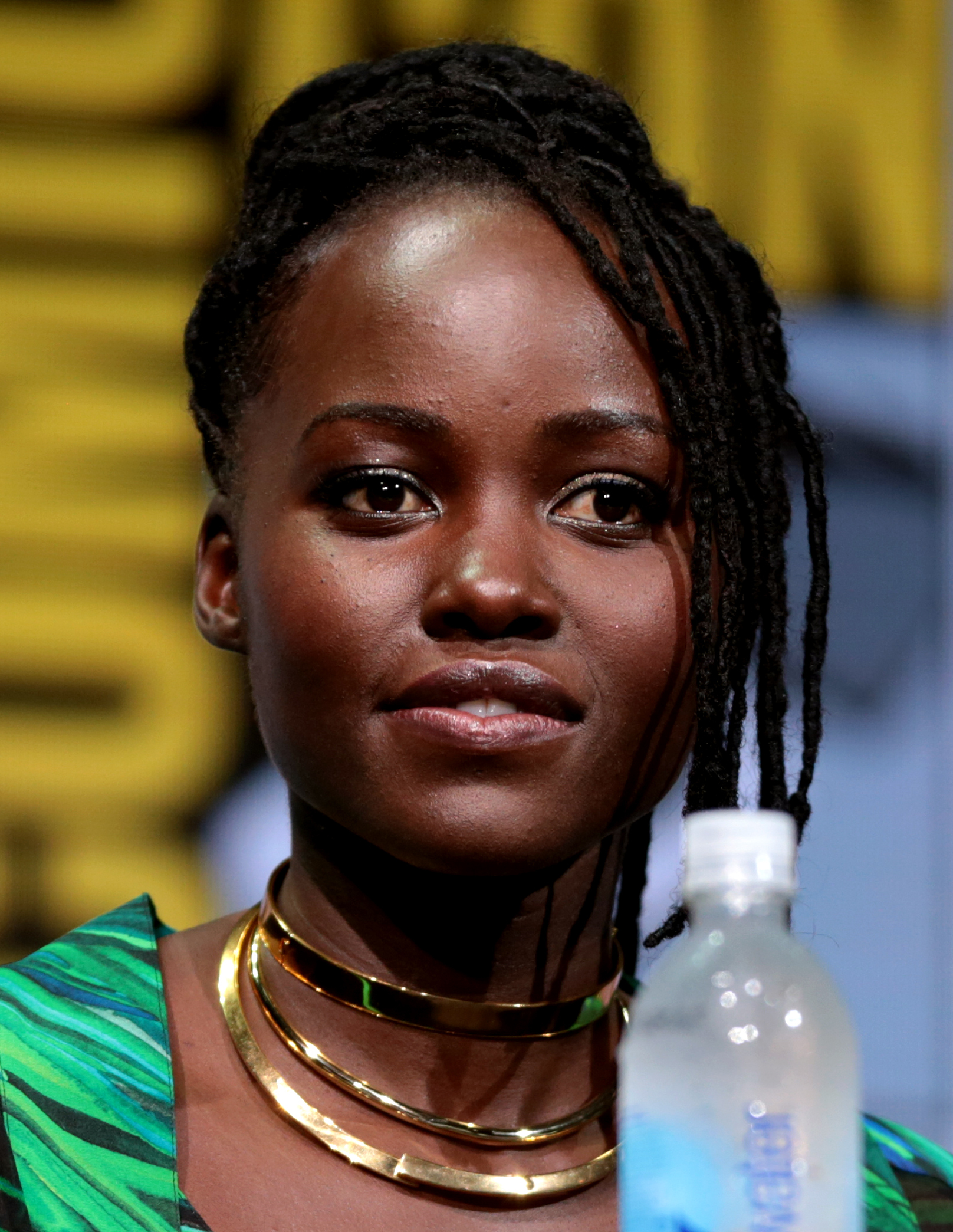
"Shake It Off" was covered by Reese Witherspoon (left) in the film Sing (2016) and Lupita Nyong'o in Little Monsters (2019).

Many musicians have covered "Shake It Off". Labrinth covered it at BBC Radio 1's Live Lounge September 20, 2014, and Charli XCX performed a punk rock-inspired version at BBC Radio 1's Live Lounge on February 10, 2015; the latter version was nominated for Best Cover Song at the 2015 mtvU Woodie Awards. Ryan Adams covered "Shake It Off" for his track-by-track interpretation of Swift's 1989, released in September 2015. Adams said that Swift's 1989 helped him cope with emotional hardships and that he wanted to interpret the songs from his perspective "like it was Bruce Springsteen's Nebraska". His version of "Shake It Off" incorporates acoustic instruments and a thumping drum line that critics found reminiscent of the drums on Springsteen's 1985 song "I'm on Fire". Coldplay covered "Shake It Off" during their Music of the Spheres World Tour shows in Vienna, Austria, on August 22 and 24, 2024, as a tribute to the three cancelled shows of Swift's Eras Tour following the uncovering of a terror plot.

"Shake It Off" has been parodied and adapted into other mediums. In an April 2015 episode of Lip Sync Battle, the actor Dwayne Johnson lip synced to "Shake It Off" and Bee Gees' "Stayin' Alive" (1977) in a battle against Jimmy Fallon, and won. The title of "Chris Has Got a Date, Date, Date, Date, Date", a Family Guy episode featuring a fictionalized character of Swift and aired on November 6, 2016, is a pun on the lyrics of "Shake It Off". The actress Reese Witherspoon and the comedian Nick Kroll performed an EDM-influenced version for the soundtrack to the musical animated film Sing (2016). "Shake It Off" was also sung by the actress Lupita Nyong'o on a ukulele in the comedy film Little Monsters (2019). A cover by the cast of the 2020 television series Zoey's Extraordinary Playlist was featured in the final episode of its second season. "Weird Al" Yankovic covered "Shake It Off" as the final song of his 2024 polka medley "Polkamania!".

== Personnel ==
Credits are adapted from the liner notes of 1989.

- Taylor Swift – vocals, background vocals, songwriter, clapping, shouts
- Cory Bice – assistant recording
- Tom Coyne – mastering
- Serban Ghenea – mixing
- John Hanes – engineering for mix
- Sam Holland – recording
- Michael Ilbert – recording
- Jonas Lindeborg – trumpet
- Max Martin – producer, songwriter, keyboards, programming, claps, shouts
- Shellback – producer, songwriter, acoustic guitar, bass guitar, keyboards, background vocals, drums, programming, claps, shouts, percussion
- Jonas Thander – saxophones
- Magnus Wiklund – trombone

== Charts ==
=== Weekly charts ===
2014–2015 weekly chart performance
Chart (2014–2015)	Peak position
Australia (ARIA)	1
Austria (Ö3 Austria Top 40)	6
Belgium (Ultratop 50 Flanders)	17
Belgium (Ultratop 50 Wallonia)	14
Brazil (Billboard Hot 100)	56
Canada Hot 100 (Billboard)	1
Canada AC (Billboard)	1
Canada CHR/Top 40 (Billboard)	1
Canada Hot AC (Billboard)	1
Czech Republic Airplay (ČNS IFPI)	3
Czech Republic Singles Digital (ČNS IFPI)	1
Denmark (Tracklisten)	4
Denmark Airplay (Tracklisten)	1
Euro Digital Song Sales (Billboard)	2
Finland (Suomen virallinen lista)	6
France (SNEP)	6
France Airplay (SNEP)	18
Germany (GfK)	5
Germany Airplay (BVMI)	2
Greece Digital Song Sales (Billboard)	3
Hong Kong (HKRIA)	5
Hungary (Single Top 40)	1
Hungary (Stream Top 40)	3
Iceland (Tónlistinn)	19
Ireland (IRMA)	3
Israel International Airplay (Media Forest)	4
Italy (FIMI)	10
Japan Hot 100 (Billboard)	4
Japan Adult Contemporary (Billboard)	1
Lebanon (Lebanese Top 20)	15
Luxembourg Digital Songs (Billboard)	8
Mexico Airplay (Billboard)	1
Netherlands (Dutch Top 40)	5
Netherlands (Single Top 100)	7
New Zealand (Recorded Music NZ)	1
Norway (VG-lista)	3
Poland Airplay (ZPAV)	1
Portugal Digital Songs (Billboard)	3
Romania (Airplay 100)	71
Scottish Singles Sales (Official Charts)	2
Slovakia Airplay (ČNS IFPI)	4
Slovakia Singles Digital (ČNS IFPI)	1
Slovenia (SloTop50)	8
South Africa Airplay (EMA)	2
South Korea International (Gaon)	19
Spain (Promusicae)	2
Sweden (Sverigetopplistan)	3
Switzerland (Schweizer Hitparade)	7
Ukraine Airplay (TopHit)	85
UK Singles (Official Charts)	2
US Billboard Hot 100	1
US Adult Contemporary (Billboard)	1
US Adult Pop Airplay (Billboard)	1
US Country Airplay (Billboard)	58
US Dance Club Songs (Billboard)	17
US Latin Airplay (Billboard)	48
US Pop Airplay (Billboard)	1
US Rhythmic Airplay (Billboard)	17

2023–2026 weekly chart performance
Chart (2023–2026)	Peak position
Global 200 (Billboard)	78
Lithuania Airplay (TopHit)	84
Portugal (AFP)	38
Singapore (RIAS)	20

=== Year-end charts ===
2014 year-end charts
Chart (2014)	Position
Australia (ARIA)	3
Austria (Ö3 Austria Top 40)	58
Canada (Canadian Hot 100)	9
France (SNEP)	101
Germany (Official German Charts)	39
Hungary (Single Top 40)	48
Ireland (IRMA)	12
Israel (Mako Hitlist)	48
Italy (Musica e dischi)	70
Japan (Japan Hot 100)	34
Japan Adult Contemporary (Billboard)	2
Netherlands (Dutch Top 40)	55
Netherlands (Single Top 100)	77
New Zealand (Recorded Music NZ)	3
Poland (ZPAV)	45
Spain (PROMUSICAE)	42
Switzerland (Schweizer Hitparade)	49
Taiwan (Hito Radio)	9
UK Singles (Official Charts Company)	14
US Billboard Hot 100	13
US Adult Contemporary (Billboard)	20
US Adult Pop Songs (Billboard)	19
US Pop Songs (Billboard)	19

2015 year-end charts
Chart (2015)	Position
Australia (ARIA)	49
Belgium (Ultratop Wallonia)	71
Canada (Canadian Hot 100)	17
France (SNEP)	116
Hungary (Single Top 40)	54
Japan (Japan Hot 100)	12
Slovenia (SloTop50)	31
US Billboard Hot 100	18
US Adult Contemporary (Billboard)	15
US Adult Pop Songs (Billboard)	43

2016 year-end chart
Chart (2016)	Position
Japan (Japan Hot 100)	62

2017 year-end chart
Chart (2017)	Position
Japan (Japan Hot 100)	100

2023 year-end charts
Chart (2023)	Position
Australia (ARIA)	81
Global 200 (Billboard)	143

2025 year-end chart performance
Chart (2025)	Position
Argentina Anglo Airplay (Monitor Latino)	52

=== Decade-end charts ===
2010s decade-end charts
Chart (2010–2019)	Position
Australia (ARIA)	23
UK Singles (Official Charts Company)	76
US Billboard Hot 100	34
US Digital Songs (Billboard)	41
US Streaming Songs (Billboard)	26

=== All-time charts ===
All-time charts
Chart (1958–2018)	Position
US Billboard Hot 100 (Female) (Note: Compiled by Billboard for singles during 1958–2018)	46
US Billboard Hot 100 (Note: Compiled by Billboard for singles during 1958–2018)	139
US Adult Pop Songs (Billboard) (Note: Compiled by Billboard for singles during 1996–2018)	37

== Certifications ==
Certifications
Region	Certification	Certified units/sales
Australia (ARIA)	19× Platinum	1,330,000^{‡}
Austria (IFPI Austria)	2× Platinum	60,000^{*}
Belgium (BRMA)	Gold	20,000^{‡}
Brazil (Pro-Música Brasil)	3× Diamond	750,000^{‡}
Canada (Music Canada)	6× Platinum	480,000^{*}
Denmark (IFPI Danmark)	2× Platinum	180,000^{‡}
France (SNEP)	Diamond	333,333^{‡}
Germany (BVMI)	3× Gold	900,000^{‡}
Italy (FIMI)	2× Platinum	200,000^{‡}
Japan (RIAJ)	3× Platinum	750,000^{*}
Mexico (AMPROFON)	Gold	30,000^{*}
New Zealand (RMNZ)	7× Platinum	210,000^{‡}
Norway (IFPI Norway)	2× Platinum	120,000^{‡}
Portugal (AFP)	Gold	10,000^{‡}
Spain (Promusicae)	2× Platinum	120,000^{‡}
Sweden (GLF)	Platinum	40,000^{‡}
Switzerland (IFPI Switzerland)	Platinum	30,000^{‡}
United Kingdom (BPI)	6× Platinum	3,600,000^{‡}
United States (RIAA)	Diamond	10,000,000^{‡}
Streaming
Denmark (IFPI Danmark)	Gold	1,300,000^{†}
Japan (RIAJ)	Platinum	100,000,000^{†}
^{*} Sales figures based on certification alone.^{‡} Sales+streaming figures based on certification alone.^{†} Streaming-only figures based on certification alone.

== Release history ==
Release dates and formats
Region	Date	Format	Label(s)	Ref.
United States	August 18, 2014	Contemporary hit radio; adult contemporary radio	Big Machine; Republic	
Various	August 19, 2014	Digital download	Big Machine	
Italy	August 29, 2014	Radio airplay	Universal	
United States	September 11, 2014	CD single	Big Machine	
Germany	October 10, 2014	CD single	Universal	

== "Shake It Off (Taylor's Version)" ==
"Shake It Off (Taylor's Version)"

Song by Taylor Swift

from the album 1989 (Taylor's Version)
- Released: October 27, 2023
- Studio: Prime Recording (Nashville)
- Length: 3:39
- Label: Republic
- Songwriters: Taylor Swift; Max Martin; Shellback
- Producers: Taylor Swift; Christopher Rowe

Lyric video
- "Shake It Off (Taylor's Version)" on YouTube

After signing a new contract with Republic Records, Swift began re-recording her first six studio albums in November 2020. The decision followed a public 2019 dispute between Swift and the talent manager Scooter Braun, who acquired Big Machine Records, including the masters of Swift's albums which the label had released. By re-recording the albums, Swift had full ownership of the new masters, which enabled her to control the licensing of her songs for commercial use. In doing so, she hoped that the re-recorded songs would substitute the Big Machine-owned masters.

The re-recording of "Shake It Off", subtitled "Taylor's Version", was released as part of 1989's re-recording, 1989 (Taylor's Version), on October 27, 2023. Swift produced "Shake It Off (Taylor's Version)" with Christopher Rowe, who had produced her previous re-recordings. The track was engineered by Derek Garten and Lowell Reynolds at Prime Recording Studio in Nashville, Tennessee; mixed by Ghenea at MixStar Studios in Virginia Beach, Virginia; and mastered by Randy Merrill at Sterling Sound in Edgewater, New Jersey. Rowe and Sam Holland recorded Swift's vocals at Conway Recording Studios in Los Angeles and Kitty Committee Studio in New York.

=== Personnel ===
Credits are adapted from the liner notes of 1989 (Taylor's Version).

Technical

- Taylor Swift – producer
- Bryce Bordone – engineer for mix
- Mattias Bylund – horn recording, horn editing
- Derek Garten – engineering, additional programming, editing
- Serban Ghenea – mixing
- Sam Holland – vocals recording
- Lowell Reynolds – engineering, additional programming, editing
- Christopher Rowe – vocals recording, producer

Musicians

- Taylor Swift – vocals, background vocals, songwriter
- Robert Allen – foot stomps, handclaps, background vocals
- Max Bernstein – synth horns
- Matt Billingslea – percussion
- Janne Bjerger – trumpet
- Mattias Bylund – synth horns, conducting
- Wojtek Goral – alto saxophone, baritone saxophone
- Amos Heller – bass
- Peter Noos Johansson – trombone, tuba
- Magnus Johansson – trumpet
- Tomas Jönsson – baritone saxophone, tenor saxophone
- Max Martin – songwriter
- Mike Meadows – synthesizer, background vocals
- Christopher Rowe – trumpet, background vocals
- Paul Sidoti – electric guitar, background vocals
- Shellback – songwriter, drums, laser harp

=== Charts ===
Chart performance
Chart (2023)	Peak position
Australia (ARIA)	18
Canada Hot 100 (Billboard)	24
Global 200 (Billboard)	21
Greece International (IFPI)	36
New Zealand (Recorded Music NZ)	27
Philippines (Billboard)	22
Sweden Heatseeker (Sverigetopplistan)	4
UK Singles Downloads (Official Charts)	46
UK Singles Sales (OCC)	53
UK Streaming (OCC)	26
US Billboard Hot 100	28
Vietnam (Vietnam Hot 100)	94

=== Certifications ===
Certifications
Region	Certification	Certified units/sales
Australia (ARIA)	Platinum	70,000^{‡}
Brazil (Pro-Música Brasil)	Gold	20,000^{‡}
New Zealand (RMNZ)	Gold	15,000^{‡}
United Kingdom (BPI)	Silver	200,000^{‡}
^{‡} Sales+streaming figures based on certification alone.

== See also ==
- List of best-selling singles in the UK
- List of highest-certified singles in Australia
- List of Billboard Hot 100 number ones singles of 2014
- List of Billboard Adult Contemporary number ones of 2014
- List of Billboard Adult Contemporary number ones of 2015
- List of Canadian Hot 100 number-one singles of 2014
- List of number-one digital songs of 2014 (U.S.)
- List of number-one singles of 2014 (Australia)
- List of number-one singles from the 2010s (New Zealand)
- List of most-viewed YouTube videos
- List of most-liked YouTube videos
