= Never Get Enough =

Never Get Enough may refer to:

- "Neva Get Enuf", a 2002 song by 3LW
- Never Get Enough, a 2015 EP by Eva Avila
