= Playas Gon' Play =

2001 single by 3LW

Single by 3LW

from the album 3LW
- B-side: "Never Let 'Em Go"
- Released: April 10, 2001
- Genre: R&B
- Length: 4:40 (album version); 3:40 (radio edit)
- Label: Epic
- Songwriters: Sean "Sep" Hall; Nate Butler
- Producer: Sean "Sep" Hall

3LW singles chronology
"No More (Baby I'ma Do Right)" (2000)	"Playas Gon' Play" (2001)	"Feels Good (Don't Worry Bout a Thing)" (2002)

Music video
- "Playas Gon' Play" on YouTube

"Playas Gon' Play" is the second and final single from American girl group 3LW's self-titled debut album (2000). The single was released in April 2001 and peaked at number 81 on the Billboard Hot 100. It performed moderately on the UK Singles Chart, where it peaked at number 21. In 2017, Billboard named the song number 89 on their list of "100 Greatest Girl Group Songs of All Time". The song featured lead vocals by Naturi Naughton.

== Music video ==
The video for "Playas Gon' Play" was directed by Darren Grant. It starts with 3LW being dropped off at a tropical beach resort on an unknown island. Once they have been dropped off, they change into their bikinis and walk through the resort. As they walk through the resort, boys are looking at them. Throughout the video are scenes of 3LW hanging out on a balcony watching over the resort, sitting at a bar, and sitting at the pool. Another portion of the video shows 3LW performing a dance routine in front on the pond at the resort at night. The video received decent video play on TV channels such as BET and MTV and enjoyed some success on BET's 106 & Park and MTV's Total Request Live.

== Track listings ==
US CD single

1. "Playas Gon' Play" (album version) – 4:40
2. "Playas Gon' Play" (instrumental) – 4:43
3. "Playas Gon' Play" (a cappella) – 4:37
4. "Never Let Em' Go" (album version) – 3:46
5. "Never Let Em' Go" (remix) – 4:04

UK CD single

1. "Playas Gon' Play" (radio edit) – 3:40
2. "Playas Gon' Play" (8 Jam Street mix) – 5:08
3. "Playas Gon' Play" (System 3 Step mix) – 6:11
4. "Playas Gon' Play" (video) – 3:48

UK cassette single

1. "Playas Gon' Play" (radio edit) – 3:40
2. "Playas Gon' Play" (8 Jam Street mix) – 5:08
3. "Dear Diary" – 4:15

Australian CD single

1. "Playas Gon' Play" (radio edit) – 3:40
2. "Playas Gon' Play" (Street mix) – 5:15
3. "Playas Gon' Play" (System 3 Step mix) – 6:11
4. "No More (Baby I'ma Do Right)" (8 Jam Street mix) – 5:08

== Charts ==
=== Weekly charts ===
Chart (2001)	Peak position
Australia (ARIA)	66
Europe (Eurochart Hot 100)	83
Ireland (IRMA)	46
New Zealand (Recorded Music NZ)	36
Scotland Singles (OCC)	45
UK Singles (OCC)	21
UK Dance (OCC)	7
UK Hip Hop/R&B (OCC)	5
US Billboard Hot 100	81
US Hot R&B/Hip-Hop Songs (Billboard)	56
US Rhythmic Airplay (Billboard)	17

=== Year-end charts ===
Chart (2001)	Position
US Rhythmic Top 40 (Billboard)	68

== Release history ==
Region	Date	Format(s)	Label(s)	Ref.
United States	April 10, 2001	Rhythmic contemporary; urban radio	Epic	
United States	May 1, 2001	Contemporary hit radio	Epic	
United Kingdom	August 27, 2001	12-inch vinyl; CD; cassette	Epic	
Australia	October 15, 2001	CD	Epic	

== Lawsuit ==
In 2017, "Playas Gon' Play" writers Sean Hall and Nathan Butler filed a lawsuit accusing Taylor Swift of copyright infringement because Swift's 2014 song "Shake It Off" from her album 1989 features the lyrics "the players gonna play, play, play, play, play and the haters gonna hate, hate, hate, hate, hate." Swift claimed in a 2022 declaration that she had never heard "Playas Gon' Play" or anything else by 3LW prior to writing "Shake It Off," rather, the first time she heard the song was after the claim was made against her. Swift also pointed out other songs that use similar phrasing and said the concept is common phrasing, whereas Hall and Butler claimed the phrasing, while common in recent years, was unique at the time they wrote the song. On December 12, 2022, the lawsuit was dropped with no final verdict.
