= 3LW (album) =

Studio album by 3LW
- Released: December 5, 2000
- Recorded: July 1999 – April 2000
- Length: 51:53
- Label: Epic
- Producers: The Co-Stars; Chrissy Conway; Chad Elliott; Full Force; Sean "Sepp" Hall; Ken Johnston; Brian Kierulf; Edwin "Tony" Nicholas; Gregg Pagani; Poke & Tone; Precision; Joe Priolo; Joshua Schwartz; She'kspere; Jujuan Williams

3LW chronology
3LW (2000)	A Girl Can Mack (2002)

Singles from 3LW
- 1. "No More (Baby I'ma Do Right)" Released: October 3, 2000; 2. "Playas Gon' Play" Released: April 10, 2001

3LW is the debut studio album by American girl group 3LW. It was released through Epic Records on December 5, 2000 in the United States. Over the course of nine months, the group recorded material for the project, working with a range of producers and songwriters to craft a contemporary R&B sound aimed at the teen pop market. Contributors to the album included Chrissy Conway, Chad Elliott, production teamss Full Force and Poke & Tone, Trackmasters (Poke & Tone), and Kevin "She'kspere" Briggs.

Reviews for 3LW were generally positive, with critics praising its fresh, radio-friendly blend of R&B and pop and strong vocals, while noting its manufactured image and occasional formulaic songwriting. The album peaked at number 29 on the US Billboard 200 and was certified Platinum by Recording Industry Association of America (RIAA). By March 2003, it had sold 1.3 million copies in the United States. 3LW produced the band's their debut single "No More (Baby I'ma Do Right)" which peaked at number 23 on the Billboard Hot 100, and their follow-up single "Playas Gon' Play".

== Background and production ==
In April 1999, Kiely Williams, Adrienne Bailon and Naturi Naughton met each other at an audition. The following week later the trio went to a recording studio to record a 4-song demo tape. Eventually they caught the attention of Sony Music Entertainment chairman/CEO Tommy Mottola and after performing for him he signed them to his label. For nine months the girls recorded material for their debut album. Bailon discussed the developmental experience saying, "We've become like sisters. We sing, pray, and go to church as unit". She continued," We have bunk beds, and "the bond we share is unbreakable".

== Release and promotion ==
The album was originally scheduled to be released on November 14, but was delayed to December 5, 2000. Beginning in May 2000, a marketing campaign was implemented to promote the group. 3LW cassette tape samplers and bounce-back postcards were distributed on the 'N Sync, Sisqó, and Christina Aguilera tours. 3LW were a part of Ed McMahon's mall and high school tour to promote his internet venture, "Nextbigstar.com". They had sponsorships with Adidas and Jump Magazine. Following the album's release, 3LW made several televised appearances on BET, Soul Train, and Nickelodeon, and were featured in teen-oriented magazines such as Seventeen and Teen People. 3LW also embarked on a European promotional tour in support of the project.

== Critical reception ==
Professional ratings
Review scores
Source	Rating
AllMusic	4/5 stars
Entertainment Weekly	B−
The Guardian	3/5 stars
Rolling Stone	2.5/5 stars

Ed Hogan from AllMusic praised the album for having a "fresh sound that deftly mixes hip-hop/R&B and pop." Overall, he felt that "The group's strong vocals and an overall adventurous vibe supplied by the album's producers and songwriters makes 3LW a pleasure." Barry Walters from Rolling Stone felt that the group radiate prefab vibes due to their "jerky beats" and the "kewpie-doll coo of their radio-friendly crooning". Ultimately, he declared 3LW "rise above the crassness behind their creation by laying low: no bombastic ballads, no embarrassing between-track skits, no strained displays of virtuoso technique and fake emotion".

Michael Paoletta from Billboard felt the album was full of "radio-ready singles", and like their contemporaries the group is targeting their peers with their material in which they succeed at doing. Caroline Sullivan from The Guardian considered the music on 3LW stronger than the band's name implied, noting that the trio's harmonies and experimental rhythms were clearly influenced by Destiny's Child and impressively executed given the members' young ages. She praised the opening track "No More" for its promising sound but felt the album ultimately became too formulaic and lyrically clichéd. Overall, she viewed it as polished and enjoyable, if somewhat repetitive "ear candy."

== Commercial performance ==
In the United States, 3LW peaked at number 29 on the Billboard 200 and number 19 on the Top R&B/Hip-Hop Albums. A steady seller, it was eventually certified Platinum by the Recording Industry Association of America (RIAA), signifying shipments of one million copies in the United States, and had surpassed 1.3 million copies in domestic sales by March 2003. In Canada, the album reached number 32 on the Canadian R&B Albums chart compiled by Nielsen SoundScan. In the United Kingdom, the album peaked at number 75 on the UK Albums Chart and number 21 on the UK R&B Albums Chart.

== Track listing ==
3LW track listing
No.	Title	Writer(s)	Producer(s)	Length
1.	"No More (Baby I'ma Do Right)"	Sean "Sepp" Hall; Nathan Butler; Cameron Giles	Hall	4:23
2.	"Is You Feelin' Me"	Gregg Pagani; Mar'Leina Kemp	Pagani	4:17
3.	"Playas Gon' Play"	Hall; Butler	Hall	4:43
4.	"Gettin' Too Heavy"	Michele Williams; Joshua Schwartz; Brian Kierulf	Schwartz; Kierulf	4:37
5.	"I'm Gonna Make You Miss Me"	Stephanie Salzman; Lindy Robbins; Jay Condiotti	Schwartz; Kierulf	4:36
6.	"Not This Time"	Chrissy Conway; Joe Priolo; Errol Johnson	Conway; Priolo	3:20
7.	"More Than Friends (That's Right)"	Brian George; Junior Clark; Paul Anthony George; Lucien George, Jr.; Curt Bedeau; Gerry Charles; Charlene Cockett; Darryl Barksdale; Morgan Robinson	Full Force	3:54
8.	"Curious"	Hall; Butler; Johnathan Baker	Hall	4:49
9.	"'Til I Say So"	M. Williams; Vito Colapietro; Nathan Porter; Neely Dinkins; Gregory Crapps	The Co-Stars; Ken Johnston	3:57
10.	"Crush On You"	M. Williams; V. Williams; Colapietro; Porter; Dinkins; Crapps; James Glasco	The Co-Stars	3:59
11.	"Ocean"	Brenda K. Starr; E. Raheim	Edwin "Tony" Nicholas	4:44
12.	"I Can't Take It" (No More Remix, featuring Nas)	Samuel Barnes; Jean Claude Olivier; Nasir Jones; Cynthia Loving; Eric Barrier; William Griffin	Poke & Tone; Precision	4:26

Japanese bonus track
No.	Title	Writer(s)	Producer(s)	Length
13.	"Dear Diary"	3LW; M. Williams; Chad Elliott	Elliott	4:15

Walmart limited edition – bonus disc
No.	Title	Writer(s)	Producer(s)	Length
1.	"Never Let 'Em Go"	Kevin "She'kspere" Briggs; Kandi Burruss	Briggs; Jujuan Williams	4:06
2.	"I Think You Should Know"	3LW; M. Williams; Conya Doss; Phillip O'Rourke; Tony Nicholas	Tony Nicholas	3:18
3.	"Dear Diary"	3LW; M. Williams; Chad Elliott	Elliott	4:15
4.	"Playas Gon' Play" (Enhanced Video)

Sample credits

- "More Than Friends (That's Right)" contains a sample from "Rockin' It" (1982), performed by The Fearless Four.

== Charts ==
=== Weekly charts ===
Weekly chart performance for 3LW
Chart (2000–01)	Peak position
Canadian R&B Albums (Nielsen SoundScan)	32
UK Albums (Official Charts)	75
UK R&B Albums (Official Charts)	21
US Billboard 200	29
US Top R&B/Hip-Hop Albums (Billboard)	19

=== Year-end charts ===
Year-end chart performance for 3LW
Chart (2001)	Position
Canadian R&B Albums (Nielsen SoundScan)	103
US Billboard 200	76
US Top R&B/Hip-Hop Albums (Billboard)	61

== Certifications ==
Certifications for 3LW
Region	Certification	Certified units/sales
United States (RIAA)	Platinum	1,300,000
^{^} Shipments figures based on certification alone.
