= Sing On! =

2020 reality television show

- Genre: Reality competition Game show
- Directed by: Richard Riet
- Presented by: Tituss Burgess
- Opening theme: Varies in accordance of the episode theme
- Composer: David Tench
- Country of origin: United States
- Original language: English
- No. of seasons: 1
- No. of episodes: 8

Production
- Executive producers: Victoria Ashbourne; Stuart Shawcross; Paul Wright
- Producer: Jamie Rea
- Production locations: Pinewood Studios; Buckinghamshire, England, United Kingdom
- Editors: Paul Bussey; Mark Goodwin; Judith Hay; Phil Shephard; Paul Wright
- Running time: 34-37 minutes
- Production company: Hello Dolly!

Original release
- Network: Netflix
- Release: September 16, 2020

Sing On! is a 2020 reality game show television series hosted by Tituss Burgess. It premiered on Netflix on September 16, 2020.

== Format ==
=== Main game ===
A team of six contestants performs a total of five songs that share the same theme. For each song, each remaining contestant who is part of the team must sing their assigned lines, with the order of performance being assigned at random. The amount of money that is added to the jackpot (which has a maximum value of $60,000) is determined based on how well the team sings; the individual scores (which determine a contestant's vocal accuracy) are calculated during the performance. At the end of a song, the contestant with the highest individual score (out of 100 percent) advances to the next round; the other contestants are put up for elimination via a secret vote. After the contestants vote, the contestant who has the most votes is eliminated from the game and leaves with no money except if they accumulated a bonus prize; if there is a tie, the contestant with the lowest individual score is eliminated. This process continues until two contestants remain. In the first two rounds, the maximum value for each song is $10,000; the value increases to $20,000 per song in the third and fourth rounds. During the second round, a “Tituss Prize” for best physical performance of $500 is awarded to one contestant. If the “Tituss Prize” isn’t awarded in the second round, it continues until awarded by the host. The rules change slightly for the fourth round, where the "Golden Note" bonus feature, where each of the three remaining contestants can win a guaranteed $1,000 bonus by perfectly singing a designated note, goes into effect; no voting takes place in the fourth round, where the contestant with the lowest individual score is eliminated. The format for the main game is somewhat similar to Weakest Link.

=== Endgame ===
In the final round of the game, two contestants compete. The contestant who had the highest individual score at the end of the fourth round is given a list of two songs to choose from; the other contestant is responsible for singing the first lines. Unlike in the first four rounds, the individual scores for both contestants are not calculated during the performance, and no additional money is added to the jackpot. Once the song finishes, the individual scores are determined; the contestant with the highest individual score claims the jackpot plus any accumulated bonuses.

== International versions ==
Country	Title	Presenter	Channel	Airdates		
Vietnam	Cùng hát lên nào	Thanh Duy	VTV3	Netflix	19 February 2022	2026
Germany	Sing On! Germany	Palina Rojinski	Netflix	7 August 2020		
Spain	¡A cantar!	Ricky Merino	Netflix	24 July 2020		

== See also ==
- The Weakest Link - A quiz show that works on the similar premises of contestants working as a team to build the prize money and periodically voting off the weakest performer.
- The Singing Bee (disambiguation)
- Don't Forget the Lyrics!
