= Naughty or Nice (album) =

Studio album by 3LW
- Released: November 26, 2002
- Recorded: September 2002
- Genre: Christmas; hip hop; R&B
- Length: 37:00
- Label: Epic
- Producer: Tse Williams, Michele Williams

3LW chronology
A Girl Can Mack (2002)	Naughty or Nice (2002)

Professional ratings
Review scores
Source	Rating
AllMusic	2/5 stars

Naughty or Nice is a Christmas album, as well as the third and final studio album by American girl group 3LW, released in 2002. The album was recorded without Naturi Naughton who had recently left the group.

The album features nine original songs with Christmas-themed lyrics and a cover of the Christmas classic "Have Yourself A Merry Little Christmas". Adrienne Bailon and Kiely Williams would later re-record the song with Sabrina Bryan as the Cheetah Girls for the 2007 compilation, Disney Channel Holiday.

Despite being a Christmas album, some of the songs on Naughty or Nice feature more mature content similar to that of A Girl Can Mack, and the album is largely hip-hop influenced. The mature content and hip-hop sound of the album would heavily contrast the R&B and pop sound of 3LW's debut album. Bailon and Williams would later go on to record as The Cheetah Girls.

Released just weeks after A Girl Can Mack, Naughty or Nice did not chart.

== Track listing ==
No.	Title	Writer(s)	Producer(s)	Length
1.	"Xmas in the Hood"	Adrienne Bailon; Beau Dozier; Kiely Williams	Dozier	3:43
2.	"Naughty on Xmas"	Dozier; Nate Butler	Dozier	3:12
3.	"Christmas Party" (featuring Treach of Naughty by Nature)	Steve Russell; Troy Taylor	Russell; Taylor	3:51
4.	"This Year (It's All About You)"	Kangol; Sidiq Alexander	Kangol; Sidiq	4:24
5.	"Ahh Hell Nah"	Dozier; Butler	Dozier	3:04
6.	"Shady Holiday"	Mischke Butler; Russell	Russell	4:19
7.	"Santa's Coming"	Glen Moseley; Keith Miller; Shanell L. Irving; Tanesha Blacks	Moseley; Miller	4:48
8.	"Take You Home for Christmas"	Butler; Russell	Russell	5:07
9.	"Christmas Love"	Bailon; Dozier; Williams	Russell	4:50
10.	"Have Yourself a Merry Little Christmas"	Hugh Martin; Ralph Blane	Russell	2:00
