= Nate Butler =

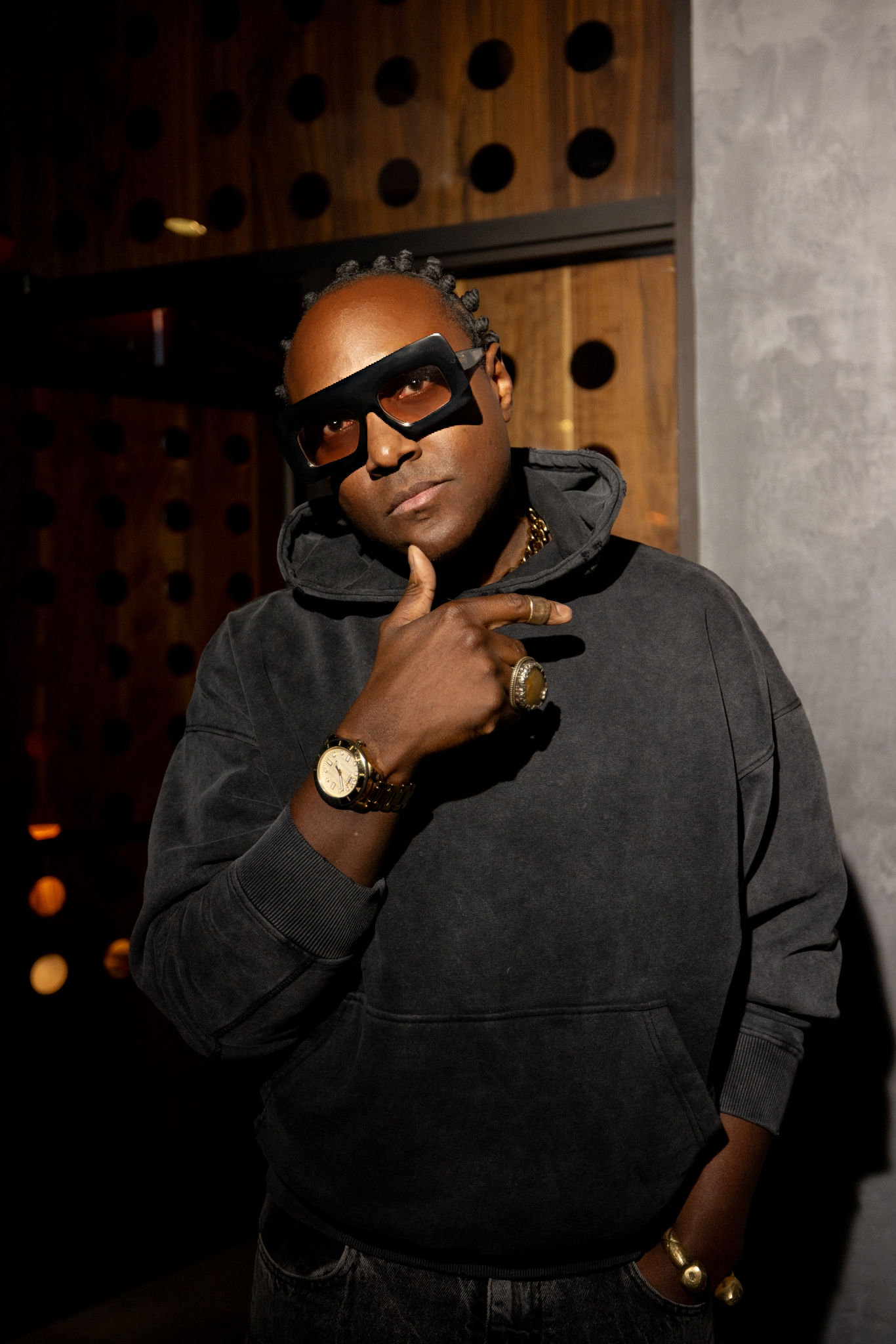

Background information
- Born: Nate Butler; August 15, 1981 (age 44); Baltimore, Maryland, US
- Genres: R&B, pop, electronica, soul, Rap/Hip hop
- Occupations: Singer-songwriter, record producer, casting (performing arts)
- Years active: 1992–present

Nate Butler is an American songwriter, music producer, vocal producer, recording artist, and casting director based in Atlanta, Georgia. He has been a part of 50 plus million records sold worldwide at last count. Butler has worked with multi-platinum artists such as A Boogie wit da Hoodie, Luther Vandross, Victoria Beckham aka Posh Spice, Houston, Craig David, Backstreet Boys, 3LW, Christina Milian, Stacie Orrico, JoJo, Aaron Carter, The Cheetah Girls and others. Butler launched the career of the platinum R&B group 3LW by writing their hit singles: No More (Baby I'ma Do Right) and Playas Gon' Play. Two of the members of 3LW, Kiely Williams and Adrienne Bailon, went on to become members of the worldwide Disney sensation The Cheetah Girls. He subsequently contributed as a songwriter to The Cheetah Girls catalog, whose recordings sold more than 11 million records worldwide. Butler also penned the notable chart topping R&B smash single "Afterparty" by Koffee Brown, also referred to as a R&B classic.

Butler helped launch the careers of many artists, such as the American Idols and others such as, S Club 7 (U.K.), L5 (France), Blue (U.K.), Sugababes (U.K.), Miss3 (Norway), BoA (Japan), and Lola (Italy). Butler has racked up credits on blockbuster films such as Barbershop, Four Brothers, Dr. Dolittle 2, Save the Last Dance, and the Nickelodeon hit Jimmy Neutron.

Butler was a part of the casting team of The X Factor. During his tenure, Fifth Harmony, which later achieved worldwide commercial success and sold more than 30 million records worldwide. As well as casting team of America's Got Talent Season 9 and 10.

He worked as the Jr. Casting Producer for Showtime at the Apollo on Fox Entertainment Group hosted by Steve Harvey and he is currently casting for the new show The Four: Battle For Stardom with Sean John Combs, DJ Khaled, Meghan Trainor, Charlie Walk the President of Universal Republic Records and Fergie which also airs on the Fox Entertainment Group. In 2020 he joined the casting team for the Netflix show Sing On! a Karaoke based show out of the UK. Later he joined the casting team for an Amazon Audible show called "Breakthrough" with Kelly Rowland, Sara Bareilles. Butler just finished the Netflix show Building the Band premiering in 2025 with host Kelly Rowland, Nicole Scherzinger and AJ McLean

He was one of the stars of the South African television show Live Your Dream, a series created to empower aspiring talent in the entertainment industry by connecting them with top executives in the arts. The show originally aired on VIA TV, DSTV channel 147. It was later rebranded as Dream Factory and moved to a new network, where it ran for two successful seasons before concluding in 2023.

== Discography ==
Sources
Artist	Song	Record label
A Boogie wit da Hoodie	Before Artistry "Glitchin"	Atlantic
KeKe Palmer	DivaGurl "Leave me Alone"	Virgin Atlantic
A Boogie wit da Hoodie	Me vs. Myself "Turn of the Radio"	Atlantic
Four Tet	Looking at your Pager	Sony Music
Efya ft Tiwa Savage	The One	Farm UK
King Combs	Birthday Suit	Bad Boy Records
Timeflies	One Hit Wonder	Epic Records
Royce Lovett	Home For Christmas	Motown
Royce Lovett	Go	Motown
Royce Lovett	That's Dat Jesus	Motown
Royce Lovett	I Wanna Love You	Motown
Royce Lovett	Reach (Feat. Nate Butler)	Motown
Royce Lovett	Freedom	Motown
Royce Lovett	Down 4 Whatever	Motown
Royce Lovett	Put Your Armour On	Motown
Royce Lovett	Show Me Love	Motown
Royce Lovett	Say Something	Motown
Royce Lovett	Write It on the Wall	Motown
Shawty Lo	Blenda	D4L/Asylum/Warner Bros
Jay Sean	Why Why Why	Virgin Records UK
Ellie	Pop Pop Fizz Fizz	Ministry of Sound UK
Ellie	Supersonic Soul	Ministry of Sound UK
Ellie	So Cruel	Ministry of Sound UK
Krave	Scrub the Ground	Upfront/Interscope
The Cheetah Girls	Falling For You	Walt Disney Records
Stacie Orrico	Save Me	Virgin
Stacie Orrico	Can't Give It Up	Virgin
Guy Sebastian	I'll Never Forget Ya	Sony Music Australia
Melody	De Ja Vu	BMG/Japan
Backstreet Boys	Moving On	Jive Records/UK/Asia
Houston	What U Say	Capitol Records
Blue (boy band)	I Wanna Know	Innocent Records/Virgin UK
American Idol Juniors	No Matta What	Jive Records
Christina Milian	Perfect	Universal Records/UK
Ma$e	Sell It	Bad Boy/
Manzini	The Balloon Song	Warner Music Denmark
Jody Lei	Salt Shaker	Independiante/Sony UK
Jody Lei	Reminisce	Independiante/Sony UK
Miss 3	No Matta What	Sony Norway
Won-G	My Life	Sanctuary/Bmg
LMNT	Keep It Coming	Elektra
Justin Guarini	Be A Heartbreaker	RCA Records
Luther Vandross	Say It Now	J Records
Craig David	2 Steps Back	Windstar U.K./Atlantic US
Toya	No Matta What (Party All Night)	Arista
American Juniors	No Matta What (Party All Night Long)	Jive
Tynisha Kelli	Dats What's Up	Warner Bros/Digital Release
3LW	Crazy	Epic
3LW	Leave Wit You	Epic
3LW	No More (Baby I'ma Do Right)	Epic
3LW	Playas Gon Play	Epic
3LW	Curious	Epic
3LW	Naughty On Xmas	Epic
3LW	Ahh Nah	Epic
Koffee Brown	After Party	Arista
Scene 23	The Greatest	143 Atlantic
S Club 7	The Greatest	Universal U.K.
Michico	Should I Leave	Sony Japan
Aaron Carter	Kid in Me	Jive
Aaron Carter	AC Alienation	Jive
L5 (band)	Look at Me	Mercury France
Jimmy Cozier	Two Steps	J Records
Dawn Robinson (EnVogue)	Set It Off	Universal
Virtue	I am God	Jive
Virtue	God Is Your Source	Jive
No Secrets	Go Girlfriend	Hollywood Records
Victoria Beckham (Posh Spice)	What You Talkin Bout	Virgin
Victoria Beckham (Posh Spice)	Every Lil Part of Me	Virgin
Deleon Richards	Let Go, Let God	Universal Music Christian Group
Deleon Richards	Come Follow Me	Universal Music Christian Group
Deleon Richards	Give It Up	Universal Music Christian Group
Deleon Richards	Testify	Universal Music Christian Group
DeLeon Richards	Don't Let It	Tommy Boy
Xscape	Hold On	So So Def
Tonya Mitchell	I Represent	Motown
Elisha Laverne	Not at Home	Avex Japan
Elisha Laverne	For Me	Avex Japan
Elisha Laverne	Talking Bout	Avex Japan
Namico	Perfect	Avex Japan
Sugababes	Us Girls	Island Records UK
BoA	Be the One	Avex Japan

== Film and television placements ==
Movie	Song	Artist
Four Brothers	I Got That Fire	
Barbershop	Baby, Baby, Baby	Colin P
Save the Last Dance	Hate the Playaz	Audrey Martells
Dr. Dolittle 2	Two Steps	Jimmy Cozier
Jimmy Neutron	Go Jimmy	Aaron Carter
Jimmy Neutron	AC Alienation	Aaron Carter
Popstars (Season 2)	The Greatest	The Popstars
Taina/Nickelodeon	I Represent	Maritza

== Web campaign music and sound design catalogue ==
Company	Website	Job Description
Atlanta Botanical Gardens.	www.atlantabotanicalgardens.org	Web Site Campaign Sound Design(2006)
Coca-Cola	www.them.com	Theme music for limited release bottles (2005)
Marit Milien Couture	armchairmedia.com/projects/marit	Theme music for lingerie site (2006)
Radio One	www.freefm.com	Sound Design for David Lee Roth website(2006)
