= A Girl Can Mack =

Studio album by 3LW
- Released: October 22, 2002
- Recorded: 2001–2002
- Genre: R&B
- Length: 55:59
- Label: Epic
- Producer: Sean "Puffy" Combs; John "Jayd" Daniels; Beau Dozier; Brainz Dimilo; Beau Dozier; Joey Elias; Steve Estiverne; Full Force; Rob Fusari; Falonte Moore; Travon Potts; Anthony President; Jonathan Robinson; Steve Russell; Smash Central; Mario Winans

3LW chronology
3LW (2000)	A Girl Can Mack (2002)	Naughty or Nice (2002)

Singles from A Girl Can Mack
- 1. "I Do (Wanna Get Close to You)" Released: June 18, 2002; 2. "Neva Get Enuf" Released: November 12, 2002; 3. "I Need That (I Want That)" Released: March 28, 2003

A Girl Can Mack is the second studio album by American girl group 3LW. A follow-up to their self-titled debut album (2000), it was released by Epic Records on October 22, 2002. With A Girl Can Mack, the group attempted to shed their youthful image and craft a mature look. The album combines both ballads and upbeat songs, with several serving as a declaration of equality in romantic relationships.

Three singles were released in support of the album. The first, "I Do (Wanna Get Close To You)", features Loon and was a moderate chart hit, peaking at number 58 on the Billboard Hot 100 and at 13 in New Zealand. It was followed by the singles "Neva Get Enuf", featuring Lil Wayne, and "I Need That (I Want That)", featuring Lil' Kim, neither of which charted. The album itself debuted at number 15 on the Billboard 200 with 53,000 copies sold in its first week.

The album's release was hindered by the departure of member Naturi Naughton, who controversially left the group in August 2002, during promotion for the album. Remaining members Kiely Williams and Adrienne Bailon continued as a duo for the album's launch and release of its second single "Neva Get Enuf", before introducing Jessica Benson as the group's new third member in March 2003. With Benson, the group continued promoting the record and its third single "I Need That (I Want That)". A Girl Can Mack has sold over 176,000 copies in the United States alone.

== Background ==
3LW announced in February 2002 that they had recorded 10 tracks for their sophomore studio album to be titled A Girl Can Mack. On June 18, the group released the P. Diddy–produced single "I Do (Wanna Get Close To You)", featuring Loon. The song was a moderate chart hit, peaking at number 58 on the Billboard Hot 100. It achieved greater success in New Zealand, where it peaked at number 13. In mid-July, the group was rehearsing for a concert special as part of the TEENick Summer Concerts series.

By August, the group was set to release A Girl Can Mack, when member Naughton left the group following an altercation between her and Williams involving a plate of food from KFC. Williams and Bailon initially denied that this occurred; Williams later acknowledged the incident but said that "it was so much more than that". Naughton cited numerous conflicts with the group's management (mainly Michelle Williams, Kiely Williams's mother) and said that she was forced out of the group, while members Williams and Bailon claimed that Naughton had been unhappy within the group for some time and lacked ambition.

Following Naughton's departure, Epic Records quickly introduced Williams and Bailon to two potential replacements for Naughton. Williams and Bailon decided to continue 3LW as a duo, causing the press to jokingly refer to them as "2LW". Naughton's image and vocals still appear on the record, with Williams noting that Naughton "participated on the album just as much as we did. So we didn’t feel it would be right to not have her. This album is coming out just as it would be if she was sitting here with us." Despite this, A Girl Can Mack's planned September release date was pushed back a month and the duo returned to the studio to record five new tracks after several songs intended for the record leaked online. The album was eventually released on October 22, 2002. Naughton was only credited for lead vocals on two songs on the album - "Funny" and "More Than Friends". Naughton claimed that management prevented her from appearing on certain songs, while Bailon said: "there would be some times when she really did not even want to go to the studio - and there are a couple of songs that she did not even participate in at all."

After the second single released from the album, "Neva Get Enuf", underperformed, auditions were held across the country for a new third member. Jessica Benson made the cut and joined 3LW in March 2003. At the end of the month, the group released "I Need That (I Want That)", as the third single from A Girl Can Mack, but the song did not chart. With Benson, the group continued to promote A Girl Can Mack with several tour dates.

== Critical reception ==
Professional ratings
Review scores
Source	Rating
Sunday Herald	2.5/5 stars
USA Today	2.5/4 stars

AllMusic found that A Girl Can Mack "proves that these girls can also sing. Production, courtesy of P. Diddy, the Full Force crew, and Mario Winans, among others, is witty and imaginative." The website further remarked that the album was "divided between such club fare and slinky, sexy cuts such as "This Goes Out" and the deep after-hours soul of "Good Good Girl," and the [3LW] prove here they're adept at covering both bases." Natasha Washington, writing for The Oklahoman wrote that A Girl Can Mack "shows a mature 3LW." She noted that the band "adds high-energy dance tracks such as "Leave" and "Meet Me at the Crib," while ballads including "Crazy" and "More Than Friends" showcase sultry vocals and lush melodies." USA Today critic Steve Jones wrote that A Girl Can Mack overcame a lineup change to deliver "trademark warblings" with street-edged collaborations, while the soulful "Good Good Girl" "rises above the rest."

== Commercial performance ==
The album debuted and peaked at number 15 on the Billboard 200 with 53,000 copies sold in its first week. In its second week, it charted at 53 with 19,000 copies sold. By March 2003, the album had sold 176,000 copies in the US.

== Track listing ==
A Girl Can Mack track listing
No.	Title	Writer(s)	Producer(s)	Length
1.	"I Do (Wanna Get Close to You)" (featuring Loon)	Adeeka Stupart; Chauncey Hawkins; Mario Winans; Michael "Carlos" Jones; Sean Combs; Winsom "D'Mello" Singh	Winans; P. Diddy	4:14
2.	"Neva Get Enuf" (featuring Lil Wayne)	Anthony President; Brainz Dimilo; Ericka Yancey; Dwayne Carter; Kenneth Gamble; Leon Huff	President; Dimilo	3:44
3.	"I Need That (I Want That)" (featuring Lil' Kim)	Full Force; Kimberly Jones; Rina David; Shelene Thomas	Full Force	4:43
4.	"Ain't No Maybe"	Steve Russell; Stacia Gardner	Russell	4:22
5.	"Ghetto Love & Heartbreak"	Jack Knight; Makeba Riddick; Steve Estiverne	Estiverne	4:07
6.	"Good Good Girl"	Montell Jordan; Tandria Potts; Travon Potts	Smash Central; Travon Potts	3:42
7.	"Put Em Up" (featuring Treach of Naughty by Nature)	Curtis Richardson; John "Jayd" Daniels; Riddick; Anthony Criss	Daniels	3:35
8.	"This Goes Out"	Balewa Muhammad; Falonte Moore; Rob Fusari	Moore; Fusari	4:01
9.	"Leave wit You (I Think I Wanna)"	Beau Dozier; Nate Butler	Dozier	3:48
10.	"Crazy"	Dozier; Butler	Dozier	3:21
11.	"Funny"	Alex Cantrell; Eric Jackson; Joey Elias; Jonathan Robinson; Shaunna Bolton	Elias; Robinson	3:34
12.	"One More Time"	Alfred Jackson; Robinson; Bolton	Elias; Robinson	3:37
13.	"Be Like That" (Hidden track)	Connie McKendricks; Anthony T Prendatt	Dozier	4:15
14.	"More Than Friends" (Hidden track)	Dozier; Jason Edmonds	Dozier	3:34

Japan bonus track
No.	Title	Writer(s)	Producer(s)	Length
15.	"High Fashion"	Michelle Bell	88-Keys	3:58

Sample credits

- "Neva Get Enuf" contains a sample of "Close the Door" as performed by Teddy Pendergrass.
- "Funny" contains a sample of "Funny How Time Flies (When You're Having Fun)" by Janet Jackson.

== Charts ==
Chart performance for A Girl Can Mack
Chart (2002)	Peak position
Canadian R&B Albums (Nielsen SoundScan)	24
US Billboard 200	15
US Top R&B/Hip-Hop Albums (Billboard)	12

== Release history ==
A Girl Can Mack release history
Region	Date	Format(s)	Label
Japan	August 2002	CD; digital download	Epic Records
United States	October 22, 2002	CD; digital download	Epic Records
Germany	November 4, 2002	CD; digital download	Epic Records
