= The Singing Bee =

The Singing Bee may refer to the game show franchise:

- The Singing Bee (American game show), the original US version
- The Singing Bee (Australian game show), the Australian version
- The Singing Bee (Philippine game show), the Philippine version
