= I Do (Wanna Get Close to You) =

Single by 3LW featuring Loon

from the album A Girl Can Mack
- Released: June 18, 2002
- Recorded: Late 2001
- Genre: Dance
- Length: 3:47 (radio edit); 4:14 (album version)
- Label: Epic · Sony Music
- Songwriters: 3LW; M. Jones; W. Sing; A. Stupart; M. Winans
- Producers: P. Diddy; C.D. Hawkins

3LW singles chronology
"Feels Good (Don't Worry Bout a Thing)" (2002)	"I Do (Wanna Get Close to You)" (2002)	"Neva Get Enuf" (2002)

Loon singles chronology
"I Need a Girl (Part Two)" (2002)	"I Do (Wanna Get Close to You)" (2002)	"Young & Sexy" (2002)

"I Do (Wanna Get Close to You)" is the first single from 3LW's second album A Girl Can Mack. The single features Loon and peaked at number 58 on the Billboard Hot 100 during 2002. It achieved greater success in New Zealand, where it peaked at number 13 on the New Zealand Top 40. It is the last single to feature Naturi Naughton.

== Background ==
In May 2002, 3LW member Adrienne Bailon discussed the song, saying "[The song] is a lot of fun". According to Bailon the group "wanted to come out with a song that was going to make people happy."

== Critical reception ==
Chuck Taylor from Billboard compared the song to the work of Ashanti and praised the group's vocals on the track saying it was "a fine, fine performance". Overall, he felt that the song was a hit and that it would "saturate the top 40 and R&B airwaves through the summer".

== Music video ==
The music video for "I Do (Wanna Get Close to You)" was directed by Chris Applebaum and it shows the girls, hitting "the club in search of good time". The videos setting is based in a "futuristic pod-like venue in the middle of the ocean where they come across Loon — who raps on the track". Rap group Naughty by Nature and rapper/actor Nick Cannon both make cameo appearances in the video. By June 2002, the video was in post-production and was released in July.

== Track listing ==
US mini single

1. "I Do (Wanna Get Close to You) (feat. Loon) – 4:14
2. "Neva Get Enuf" – 3:46

Australian & New Zealand Maxi Single

1. "I Do (Wanna Get Close to You) (feat. Loon) (Radio Edit)"
2. "I Do (Wanna Get Close to You) (Callout Hook)"
3. "I Do (Wanna Get Close to You) (Instrumental)"
4. "I Do (Wanna Get Close to You) (feat. Loon) (Acapella)"
5. "I Do (Wanna Get Close to You) (No Rap Edit)"

US Promo Single

1. "I Do (Wanna Get Close to You) (feat. Loon) (Radio Edit)"
2. "I Do (Wanna Get Close to You) (Instrumental)"
3. "I Do (Wanna Get Close to You) (feat. Loon) (Acapella)"
4. "I Do (Wanna Get Close to You) (No Rap Edit)
5. "I Do (Wanna Get Close to You) (Callout Hook)

== Charts ==
Chart (2002)	Peak position
Australia (ARIA)	41
Australian Urban (ARIA)	12
New Zealand (Recorded Music NZ)	13
US Billboard Hot 100	58
US Pop Airplay (Billboard)	26
US Hot R&B/Hip-Hop Songs (Billboard)	50
US Rhythmic Airplay (Billboard)	13

== Release history ==
Region	Date	Format(s)	Label(s)	Ref(s).
United States	June 18, 2002	Digital download	Epic · Sony Music	
United States	July 8, 2002	Rhythmic contemporary radio · urban contemporary radio	Epic · Sony Music	
United States	July 22, 2002	Contemporary hit radio	Epic · Sony Music	
