= Feels Good (Don't Worry Bout a Thing) =

Single by Naughty by Nature featuring 3LW

from the album IIcons
- B-side: "Rah Rah"
- Released: April 30, 2002
- Recorded: July 2001
- Genre: Hip hop; R&B
- Length: 4:08
- Label: TVT
- Songwriters: Anthony Criss, Vincent Brown
- Producer: Naughty by Nature

Naughty by Nature singles chronology
"Holiday" (1999)	"Feels Good (Don't Worry Bout a Thing)" (2002)	"Flags" (2010)

3LW singles chronology
"Playas Gon' Play" (2001)	"Feels Good (Don't Worry Bout a Thing)" (2002)	"I Do (Wanna Get Close to You)" (2002)

"Feels Good (Don't Worry Bout a Thing)" is the only single released from Naughty by Nature's sixth album, IIcons. It was released on April 30, 2002, and featured R&B group 3LW. The single found success, making it to six Billboard charts, including 53 on the Billboard Hot 100. This was Naughty by Nature's only single to not feature DJ Kay Gee on production, instead the production was handled by the remaining members, Treach and Vin Rock.

== Single track listing ==
=== A-Side ===
1. "Feels Good (Don't Worry Bout a Thing)" (Album Mix) - 4:13
2. "Feels Good (Don't Worry Bout a Thing)" (Album Instrumental) - 4:13
3. "Feels Good (Don't Worry Bout a Thing)" (Acapella) - 4:09

=== B-Side ===
1. "Feels Good (Don't Worry Bout a Thing)" (Kelly G. Club Mix) - 8:13
2. "Rah Rah" 4:20 (Featuring Rottin Razkals)

== Charts ==
Chart (2002)	Peak position
Australia (ARIA)	34
Australian Urban (ARIA)	10
New Zealand (Recorded Music NZ)	19
Scotland Singles (OCC)	97
UK Singles (OCC)	44
UK Hip Hop/R&B (OCC)	6
US Billboard Hot 100	53
US Dance Singles Sales (Billboard)	5
US Hot R&B/Hip-Hop Songs (Billboard)	25
US Hot Rap Songs (Billboard)	1
US Pop Airplay (Billboard)	34
US Rhythmic Airplay (Billboard)	10
