= Neva Get Enuf =

Single by 3LW featuring Lil Wayne

from the album A Girl Can Mack
- Released: October 14, 2002
- Recorded: April 2002
- Genre: Pop; hip hop soul; R&B
- Length: 3:44
- Label: Epic
- Songwriters: Brainz Dimilo; Kenny Gamble; Leon Huff; Dwayne Carter; Anthony President; Ericka Yancey
- Producers: Anthony President; Brainz Dimilo

3LW singles chronology
"I Do (Wanna Get Close to You)" (2002)	"Neva Get Enuf" (2002)	"Feelin' You" (2006)

Lil Wayne singles chronology
"Way of Life" (2002)	"Neva Get Enuf" (2002)	"Go D.J." (2004)

"Neva Get Enuf" is the second single released from 3LW's second album A Girl Can Mack and features Lil Wayne, it heavily samples Teddy Pendergrass's "Close the Door". The song is a trio but the video was released by the group as a duo, after the exit of group member Naturi Naughton and before the introduction of Jessica Benson in her place. Naughton's vocals are still present on the track.

The single failed to chart on the Billboard Hot 100.

== Track listing ==
1. "Neva Get Enuf" (LP Version)
2. "Neva Get Enuf" (No Rap Edit)
3. "Neva Get Enuf" (A Cappella)

== Official versions/remixes ==
1. "Neva Get Enuf" (Call Out Hook)
2. "Neva Get Enuf" (Instrumental)
3. "Neva Get Enuf" (The Spa Remix)

== Release history ==
Region	Date	Format(s)	Label(s)	Ref(s).
United States	October 14, 2002	Urban contemporary radio	Epic	
United States	October 21, 2002	Rhythmic contemporary radio	Epic	
