= Naturi Naughton =

American actress and singer

Naturi Naughton-Lewis
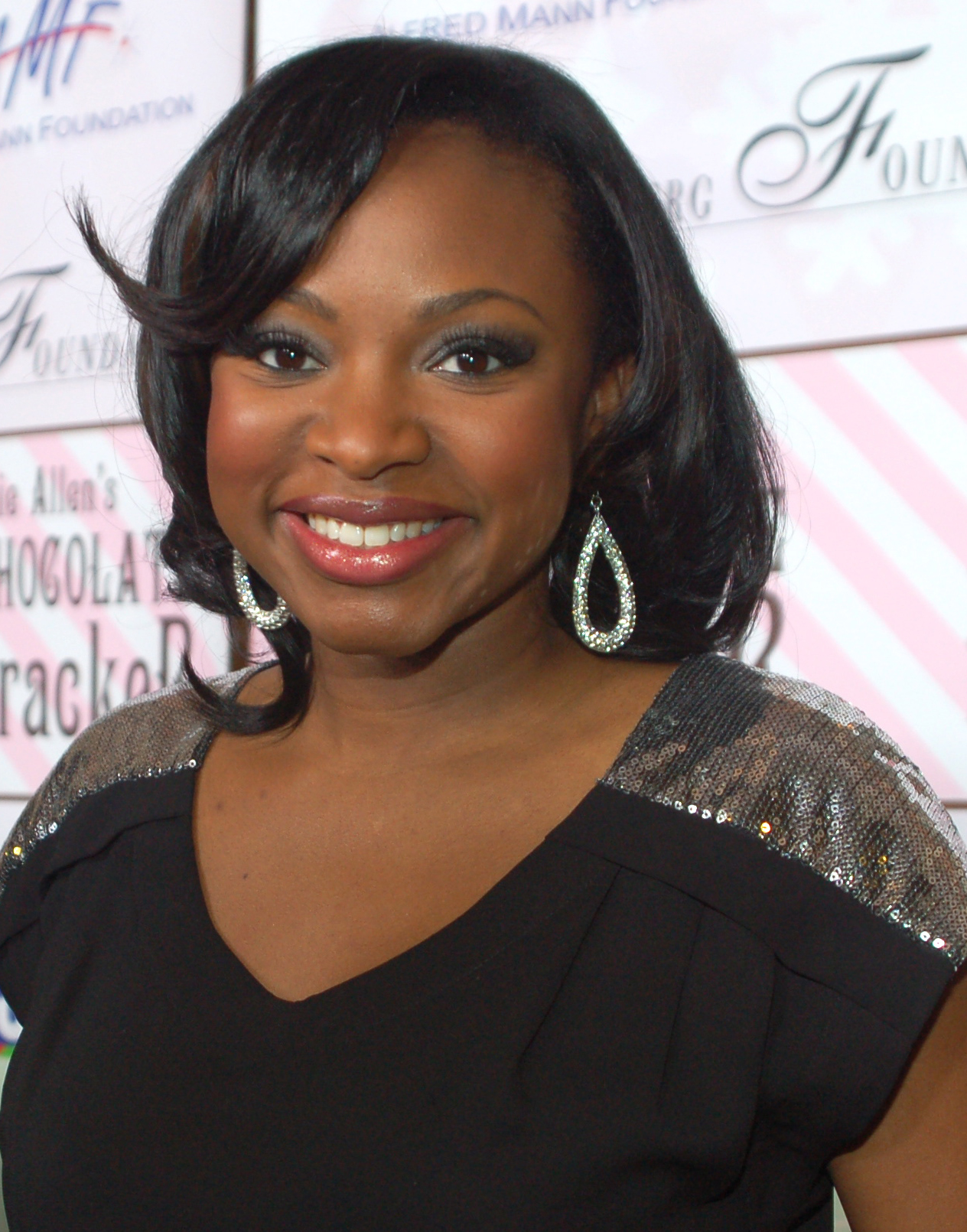
- Naughton at a performance of The Hot Chocolate Nutcracker in December 2010

Background information
- Born: Naturi Cora Maria Naughton; May 20, 1984 (age 42); East Orange, New Jersey, U.S.
- Genres: R&B; hip hop; soul
- Occupations: Singer; songwriter; actress
- Instrument: Vocals
- Years active: 1999–2002 (3LW); 2005–present (solo)
- Label: Epic Records (1999–2002)

Naturi Cora Maria Naughton-Lewis (born May 20, 1984) is an American singer, songwriter, and actress. Naughton is best known as one-third of the R&B group 3LW and for her acting roles in the films Fame and Notorious, playing rapper Lil' Kim in the latter film. Naughton was a series regular on the NBC series The Playboy Club as Bunny Brenda, starred in the first season of the Lifetime drama series The Client List as Kendra and starred in the Starz drama Power as Tasha St. Patrick, a role she reprised in the spin-off series Power Book II: Ghost. In 2022, she starred as Jill “Da Thrill” in the ABC series Queens.

== Early life and education ==
Naughton was born and raised in East Orange, New Jersey, the daughter of Brenda, a part-time paralegal, and Ezra Naughton, a retired accountant. Her father is originally from St. Croix, U.S. Virgin Islands and her mother is from Raleigh, North Carolina. Her musical talent emerged at the age of five years old, when she joined the choir at New Hope Baptist Church in Newark, New Jersey (the same church where Whitney Houston had performed in her youth). Naughton continued her musical studies at the Newark School of the Arts. She attended St. Joseph's Catholic school and Immaculate Conception High School in Montclair, New Jersey. Naughton has sung the national anthem at various events in New Jersey and attended Seton Hall University.

== Career ==
=== 3LW ===
In 1999, at age 15, Naughton joined Adrienne Bailon and Kiely Williams to form the group 3LW. Their first single, "No More (Baby I'ma Do Right)", was released in the fall of 2000. "No More" was a success and was followed by the second single, "Playas Gon' Play" in early 2001. The group's debut album, 3LW, was released on December 5, 2000. The album went platinum, selling 1.3 million copies in the U.S. alone.

3LW returned in the summer of 2002 with the P. Diddy-produced single "I Do (Wanna Get Close to You)", featuring Loon. In August 2002, the group was set to release its newest LP, A Girl Can Mack, when Naughton announced that she was no longer a member of the trio. Naughton insisted that the other two girls and their management had forced her out. The problems reached a breaking point after a heated argument with Williams, Bailon, and their manager, which allegedly involved Williams throwing a hot plate of KFC food at Naughton. Following Naughton's departure, Bailon and Williams resumed as a duo for a short time, before Jessica Benson became Naughton's replacement. The group has since disbanded. In May 2017, Naughton reunited with Bailon on the daytime talk show The Real, while promoting the season premiere of Power.

=== Solo work ===
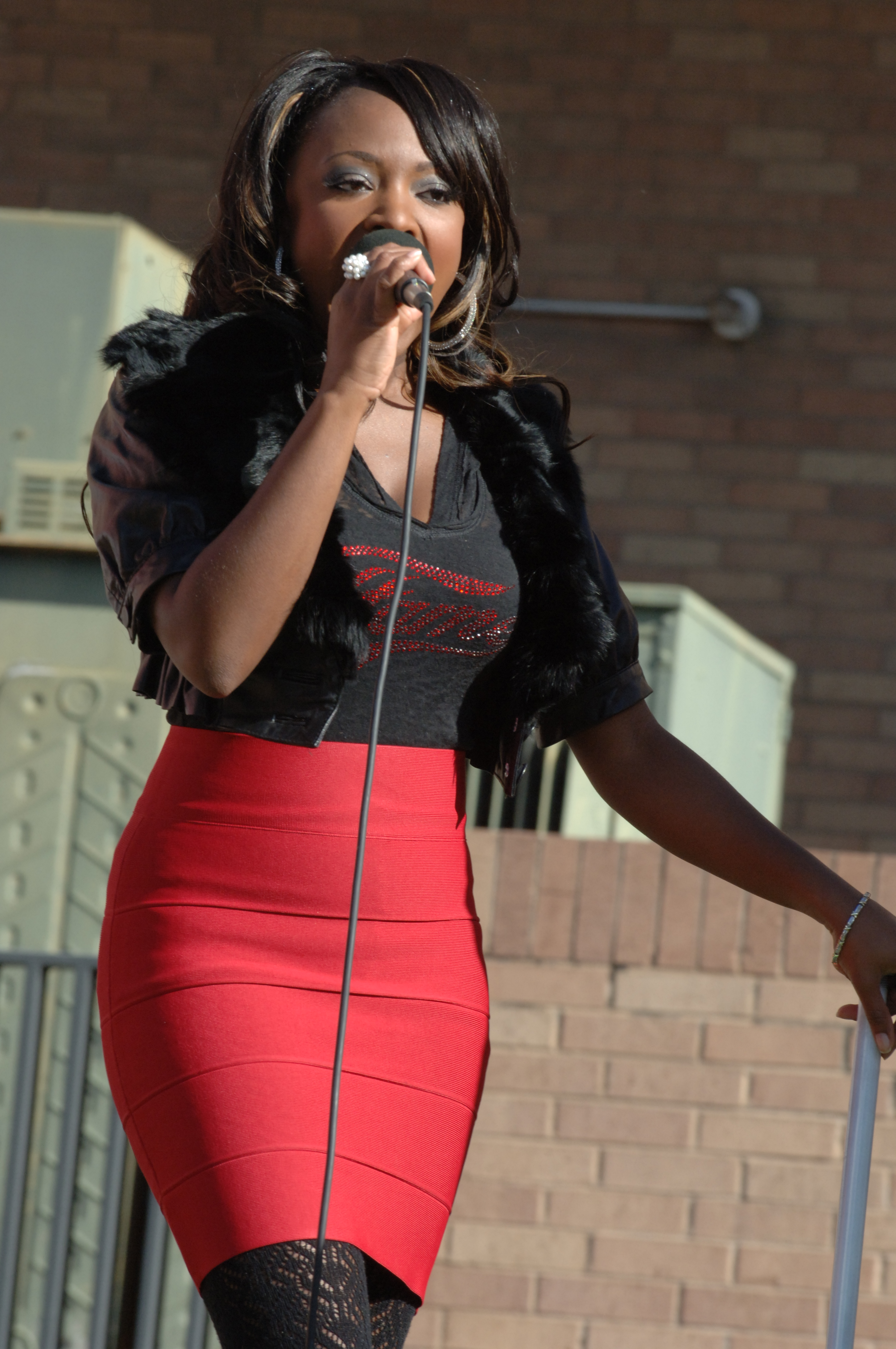
Naughton at H-E-B Holiday Parade 2009

Naughton recorded five tracks for the Fame soundtrack, released on August 25, 2009. The following month, Naughton scored her first solo chart entry ever with her cover of Fame peaking at No. 33 on the UK Singles Chart. The single also reached the Top 20 in Finland, Portugal and Norway. In 2010, an extended play was released, titled Fame Presents Naturi Naughton as Denise: Didn't I Tell You?. The EP included both previously released and unreleased tracks.

During her February 2010 appearance on The Mo'Nique Show, Naughton expressed interest in recording a solo-debut album. She was believed to be working with music producer Full Force at the time. Naughton has since revealed that she is now focusing on her acting career, but has not ruled out an album. An ensemble of demos, including a duet with Lil' Kim, have been leaked to the internet in recent years. However, it is unknown whether or not they will be released on Naughton's debut album.

=== Acting ===
In March 2008, Naughton was cast to portray Grammy Award-winning rap artist Lil' Kim in Notorious, a biopic film about The Notorious B.I.G. The film was released in January 2009 to mixed reviews and went on to make over $43 million worldwide. Lil' Kim has stated that she "hated everything about that movie" and would not have chosen Naughton to play her because they "have nothing in common".

Naughton was later cast as Denise, an aspiring singer, in the Lionsgate remake of the 1980 film of the same name Fame. Filming took place in New York City and Los Angeles in November and December 2008. The film was released in September 2009 and opened No. 3 at the U.S. box office in its opening weekend despite negative reviews from critics. It went on to make $77 million worldwide.

In August 2010, Naughton was announced to appear in an episode of the AMC drama television series Mad Men. The episode, "Hands and Knees", which aired on September 26, 2010, saw Naughton portray the role of Toni Charles, a Playboy Bunny mistress to the character Lane Pryce. That same month, Naughton appeared in the Warner Bros. Pictures comedy film Lottery Ticket.

In March 2011, Naughton appeared in the drama television series pilot The Playboy Club, which centers around the lives of the employees of the original Playboy Club operating in Chicago. The series was picked up by NBC in May 2011. Naughton portrayed Brenda, a Playboy Bunny who dreams of being the first African-American Playboy centerfold. The role marked the second time Naughton portrayed a fictional Playboy Bunny. The series premiered on September 19, 2011 and was cancelled after three episodes due to low ratings. In October 2011, Naughton appeared as a 1960s jazz club singer named Shadynasty in an episode of the sitcom It's Always Sunny in Philadelphia. In December 2011, it was announced Naughton had been cast in the Lifetime drama television series The Client List opposite Jennifer Love Hewitt. The series is a re-imagining of the 2010 film of the same name. Naughton plays the role of Kendra, a hard-working masseuse at a parlor. The series premiered on April 8, 2012 to 2.79 million viewers and mixed reviews from critics. In May 2012, Lifetime renewed the series for a 15-episode second season.

=== 2012–present: Power and Queens ===
In September 2012, Naughton starred in the BET original film Let the Church Say Amen, which is an adaptation of author ReShonda Tate Billingsley's 2005 best-selling novel of the same name. The film marked the directorial debut of actress Regina King.

Naughton then starred in the Starz drama Power as Tasha St. Patrick, the wife of James "Ghost" St. Patrick (played by Omari Hardwick), a New York nightclub owner living a double life as a drug kingpin. She won an NAACP Image Award for Outstanding Supporting Actress in a Drama Series for the third season. Naughton reprised her role as Tasha in the spin-off series Power Book II: Ghost, which began airing in September 2020.

On March 8, 2021, it was announced that Naughton had joined the cast of American Broadcasting Company's music series Queens, alongside Brandy and Eve. In May 2021, it was announced the show was being picked up for a full series, followed by the first official trailer, released on May 18. On October 1, 2021, the first promo single from Queens (“Nasty Girl"), featuring Naughton alongside the cast: Brandy, Eve and Velazquez, was released. A music video, directed by Tim Story, premiered on the same day. This was followed on October 18, 2021, by another rap song from the Queens soundtrack, “The Introduction”, which was co-written by Nas. Queens debuted on October 19; although the series was cancelled after one season, reviews were largely positive. Caroline Framke for Variety praised the quartet’s musical offering, calling their raps “sharp and distinct […] making clear their talent as both individuals and a swaggering collective”. Angie Han for The Hollywood Reporter called the show “Impressive […] lavish […] magic”.

In 2023, Naughton starred in the BET+ action thriller film Call Her King. On December 18, 2025, it was announced that Naughton would executive produce and star as Ruby in the Starz action-drama television miniseries The Nowhere Man, which premiered on January 16, 2026.

== Personal life ==
In March 2017, Naughton announced that she was expecting her first child. She welcomed a daughter with her then-partner Ben on July 19, 2017. In April 2022, Naughton married talent manager and entrepreneur Xavier "Two" Lewis in a lavish wedding ceremony in Atlanta. She welcomed her second child, a son, on May 27, 2023.

== Discography ==
- Fame Presents Naturi Naughton as Denise: Didn't I Tell You (2010)

== Filmography ==
=== Film ===
Year	Title	Role	Notes
2008	Cash Rules	-	Video
2009	Notorious	Lil' Kim	
2009	Fame	Denise Dupree	
2010	Lottery Ticket	Stacie	
2013	Highland Park	Char	
2013	Let the Church Say Amen	Rachel Jackson	TV movie
2018	Step Sisters	Aisha	
2020	Emperor	Sarah Green	
2020	Really Love	Sicily	
2022	88	Maria Jackson	
2022	The Night Before Christmas	Journee	
2023	Call Her King	Jaeda King	
2024	Abducted at an HBCU: A Black Girl Missing Movie	Ellen Hampton	Lifetime movie

=== Television ===
Year	Title	Role	Notes
2001	Taina	Ria	Episode: "Blue Mascara"
2001	The Jersey	Herself	Episode: "Speaking of Coleman"
2001	Becoming Presents: Wannabe	Herself	Episode: "3LW"
2002	The Nick Cannon Show	Herself	Episode: "Nick Takes Over Nickelodeon"
2002	All That	Herself	Episode: "3LW"
2010	Mad Men	Toni Charles	Episode: "Hands and Knees"
2011	The Playboy Club	Bunny Brenda	Main Cast
2011	It's Always Sunny in Philadelphia	Shadynasty	Episode: "Frank's Brother"
2012	The Client List	Kendra	Main Cast: Season 1
2013	Let's Stay Together	Sharon	Episode: "Single Black Stacy"
2014	The Eric Andre Show	Herself	Episode: "Naturi Naughton; Ryan Phillippe"
2014–20	Power	Tasha St. Patrick	Main Cast
2015–19	Doc McStuffins	Luna (voice)	Guest Cast: Seasons 2-3 & 5
2018	Queen of the South	Sasha Bishop	Episode: "La Muerte"
2020–24	Power Book II: Ghost	Tasha St. Patrick	Main Cast: Season 1, Guest: Seasons 2-3, Recurring cast: Season 4
2021–22	Queens	Jill “Da Thrill”	Main Cast
2025	The Nowhere Man	Ruby	Main Cast
2026	The Real Housewives of Atlanta	Herself	Episode: "Star Spangled Mess"

=== Theater ===
Year	Title	Role	Venue	Notes	Ref.
2005–06	Hairspray	Little Inez	US National Tour	Replacement	
2006–08	Hairspray	Little Inez	Neil Simon Theatre, Broadway	Replacement	
2026	The Great Gatsby	Jordan Baker	Broadway Theatre, Broadway	Replacement	

== Awards and nominations ==
Year	Award	Category	Work	Result
2001	BET Award	Best Female Group	3LW	Nominated
2001	Teen Choice Award	Choice Breakout Artist	3LW	Nominated
2001	Teen Choice Award	Choice Pop Group	3LW	Nominated
2001	Soul Train Lady of Soul Award	R&B/Soul Album of the Year – Group, Band or Duo	3LW	Won
2001	Soul Train Lady of Soul Award	Best R&B/Soul or Rap New Artist – Group, Band or Duo	"No More (Baby I'ma Do Right)"	Won
2001	Soul Train Lady of Soul Award	Best R&B/Soul Single – Group, Band or Duo	"No More (Baby I'ma Do Right)"	Nominated
2003	Soul Train Lady of Soul Award	Best R&B/Soul Single – Group, Band or Duo	"I Do (Wanna Get Close to You)"	Nominated
2003	Source Award	Best Female R&B Act	3LW	Nominated
2016	NAACP Image Award	Outstanding Supporting Actress in a Drama Series	Power	Nominated
2017	NAACP Image Award	Outstanding Supporting Actress in a Drama Series	Power	Won
2018	NAACP Image Award	Outstanding Supporting Actress in a Drama Series	Power	Won
2019	NAACP Image Award	Outstanding Actress in a Drama Series	Power	Nominated
2025	NAACP Image Award	Outstanding Actress in a Limited Television (Series, Special, or Movie)	Abducted at an HBCU: A Black Girl Missing Movie	Won
