= No More (Baby I'ma Do Right) =

2000 single by 3LW

Single by 3LW

from the album 3LW
- B-side: "I Can't Take It"
- Released: August 22, 2000
- Genre: Pop-soul; R&B; hip hop
- Length: 4:23
- Label: Epic
- Songwriters: Sean Hall; Nate Butler; Cameron Giles
- Producer: Sean "Sep" Hall

3LW singles chronology
"No More (Baby I'ma Do Right)" (2000)	"Playas Gon' Play" (2001)

Music video
- "No More (Baby I'ma Do Right)" on YouTube

"No More (Baby I'ma Do Right)" is a song by American girl group 3LW from their self-titled debut album (2000). Released on August 22, 2000, as the group's debut single, it reached number 23 on the US Billboard Hot 100 chart. The song was issued in other countries in early 2001, peaking inside the top 10 in the United Kingdom and the top five in New Zealand. There are two versions of the song, both with different rap verses by Kiely Williams.

== Music video ==
"No More (Baby I'ma Do Right)" is also 3LW's first music video. It was shot in August 2000 in various locations around New York City by director Chris Robinson and released in September. It received a fair amount of video play on TV channels such as BET, The Box and MTV and enjoyed some success on BET's top ten video countdown series 106 & Park, and MTV's Total Request Live.

== Track listings ==
US CD single

1. "No More (Baby I'ma Do Right)" – 4:22
2. "I Can't Take It" ("No More" remix featuring Nas) – 4:26
3. "No More (Baby I'ma Do Right)" (8-Jam Streetmix) – 5:08
4. "No More (Baby I'ma Do Right)" (instrumental) – 4:24
5. "No More (Baby I'ma Do Right)" (original rap version a cappella) – 4:14

Australian CD single

1. "No More (Baby I'ma Do Right)" (radio edit) – 3:33
2. "No More (Baby I'ma Do Right)" – 4:22
3. "I Can't Take It" (main "No More" remix featuring Nas) – 4:09
4. "No More (Baby I'ma Do Right)" (video)

European CD single

1. "No More (Baby I'ma Do Right)"
2. "I Can't Take It" (main "No More" remix featuring Nas)

UK CD single

1. "No More (Baby I'ma Do Right)" – 3:32
2. "No More (Baby I'ma Do Right)" (8-Jam Step Mix) – 5:28
3. "No More (Baby I'ma Do Right)" (8-Jam Streetmix) – 5:05
4. "I Can't Take It" ("No More" remix) – 4:26
5. "No More (Baby I'ma Do Right)" (video)

UK 12-inch single

A1. "No More (Baby I'ma Do Right)" (8-Jam Step Mix) – 5:28
A2. "No More (Baby I'ma Do Right)" (8-Jam Streetmix) – 5:05
B1. "I Can't Take It" ("No More" remix) – 4:26
B2. "No More (Baby I'ma Do Right)" – 4:22

UK cassette single

1. "No More (Baby I'ma Do Right)" – 3:32
2. "No More (Baby I'ma Do Right)" (8-Jam Streetmix) – 5:05
3. "I Can't Take It" ("No More" remix) – 4:26

== Charts ==
=== Weekly charts ===
Chart (2000–2001)	Peak position
Australia (ARIA)	26
Australian Urban (ARIA)	7
Canada Airplay (Nielsen BDS)	26
Europe (European Hot 100 Singles)	26
Ireland (IRMA)	22
Netherlands (Dutch Top 40 Tipparade)	5
Netherlands (Single Top 100)	58
New Zealand (Recorded Music NZ)	5
Scotland Singles (OCC)	14
UK Singles (OCC)	6
UK Dance (OCC)	11
UK Hip Hop/R&B (OCC)	1
US Billboard Hot 100	23
US Hot R&B/Hip-Hop Songs (Billboard)	22
US Pop Airplay (Billboard)	12
US Rhythmic Airplay (Billboard)	10

=== Year-end charts ===
Chart (2000)	Position
US Rhythmic Top 40 (Billboard)	78

Chart (2001)	Position
Australia (ARIA)	90
UK Singles (OCC)	109
US Billboard Hot 100	69
US Mainstream Top 40 (Billboard)	58
US Rhythmic Top 40 (Billboard)	36

== Certifications ==
Region	Certification	Certified units/sales
Australia (ARIA)	Gold	35,000^{^}
New Zealand (RMNZ)	Gold	5,000^{*}
United Kingdom (BPI)	Silver	200,000^{‡}
^{*} Sales figures based on certification alone.^{^} Shipments figures based on certification alone.^{‡} Sales+streaming figures based on certification alone.

== Release history ==
Region	Date	Format(s)	Label(s)	Ref.
United States	August 22, 2000	Rhythmic contemporary; urban radio	Epic	
Australia	April 23, 2001	CD	Epic	
United Kingdom	May 21, 2001	12-inch vinyl; CD; cassette	Epic	
