= Lil Rob discography =

- Studio albums: 9
- Extended plays: 1
- Compilation albums: 6
- Singles: 21
- Remix albums: 3
- Mixtapes: 3

This is the discography of Chicano rapper Lil Rob.

== Albums ==
=== Studio albums ===
Year	Title	Chart positions			
Year	Title	US	US R&B	US Rap	US Ind
1997	Crazy Life	—	—	—	—
1999	Natural High	—	—	—	—
2001	Can't Keep a Good Man Down	—	—	—	—
2002	The Album	—	94	—	40
2004	Neighborhood Music	—	94	—	10
2005	Twelve Eighteen (Part I)	31	16	9	3
2008	1218 (Part II)	101	16	5	12
2009	Love & Hate	158	49	21	26
2014	R.I.P. (Recording In Progress)	—	42	25	—

== Extended plays ==
- The Last Laff EP (2001)

== Remix albums ==
- DJ Supermix (2000)
- High Till I Die: Remix 2000 (2003)
- The Best of Lil Rob & Mr. Sancho Super Megamix (2009)

== Compilations ==
- Still Smokin' (2000)
- Greatest Hits Non-Stop (2004)
- Gangster Classics (2005)
- Instrumentals (2005)
- Best of Lil Rob (2008)
- Lil Rob's Oldie Collection (2010)

== Mixtapes ==
- Uncut for the Calles: The Mextape (2007)
- Everything to Me (2011)
- It's My Time (2012)

== Singles ==
Year	Title	Chart positions			Album
Year	Title	U.S.	U.S. R&B	U.S. Rap	Album
1998	"Brown Crowd"	—	—	—	Crazy Life
1999	"La Cantina"	—	—	—	Natural High
2003	"Barely Getting By"	—	—	—	The Album
2003	"Brought Up in a Small Neighborhood"	—	—	—	The Album
2003	"City That Everyone Knows"	—	—	—	The Album
2004	"Linda Mujer"	—	—	—	The Album
2004	"Drinking on My Driveway"	—	—	—	The Album
2004	"Neighborhood Music"	—	84	—	Neighborhood Music
2004	"Can We Ride?" (feat. David Wade)	—	—	—	Neighborhood Music
2005	"It's My Life"	—	—	—	Neighborhood Music
2005	"Summer Nights"	36	—	13	Twelve Eighteen (Pt. I)
2005	"Bring Out the Freak in You"	85	—	20	Twelve Eighteen (Pt. I)
2006	"Playground"	—	—	—	Twelve Eighteen (Pt. I)
2006	"Back in the Streets"	—	—	—	Twelve Eighteen (Pt. I)
2007	"Stuck with You"	—	—	—	1218 (Pt. II)
2007	"Do It"	—	—	—	1218 (Pt. II)
2007	"Just One of Those Days"	—	—	—	1218 (Pt. II)
2008	"Let Me Come Back"	—	—	—	1218 (Pt. II)
2008	"Slow It Down" (feat. Frankie J)	—	—	—	1218 (Pt. II)
2008	"Cortez Shoes"	—	—	—	1218 (Pt. II)
2009	"Make You Say"	—	—	—	Love & Hate
