= R.I.P. (Recording in Progress) =

Studio album by Lil Rob
- Released: May 27, 2014
- Genre: Chicano rap; gangsta rap
- Length: 58:16
- Label: Upstairs Records
- Producer: John Lopez (exec.); Simez Carter; Moox; DJ Soupamodel; J. Wells

Lil Rob chronology
Love & Hate (2009)	R.I.P. (Recording in Progress) (2014)

R.I.P. (Recording in Progress) is the ninth studio album by Mexican-American Chicano rap recording artist Lil Rob from San Diego, California. It was released on May 27, 2014 through Upstairs Records with distribution via INgrooves. Unlike his previous albums, Love & Hate, 1218 Part II and Twelve Eighteen Part I, this effort didn't reach the Billboard 200, but only peaked at #42 on the Top R&B/Hip-Hop Albums chart and at #25 on the Top Rap Albums chart in the United States.

== Track listing ==
Standard Edition
No.	Title	Length
1.	"Good Game"	3:30
2.	"Daddy's Home"	3:20
3.	"Been There, Done That"	3:15
4.	"Yo Baby Yo"	3:40
5.	"Thinking Twice"	3:24
6.	"Back in the Day"	3:43
7.	"Party Over Here"	3:30
8.	"Who Do You Think You Are?" (featuring Renee Batres)	3:36
9.	"Second Chance"	3:30
10.	"Start Brand New"	4:10
11.	"Keep It Gangster"	4:15
12.	"They Don't Know Me" (featuring Priscilla G.)	3:21
13.	"Everywhere I Go"	3:50
Total length:		58:16

Deluxe Edition
No.	Title	Length
14.	"Always on My Mind" (featuring Priscilla G.)	3:55
15.	"Hey Girl"	3:16
16.	"Caught Up"	3:27
Total length:		70:54

== Charts ==
Chart (2014)	Peak position
US Top R&B/Hip-Hop Albums (Billboard)	42
US Top Rap Albums (Billboard)	25
