= All You've Got =

- DVD cover
- Written by: K.A. Hoeffner
- Directed by: Neema Barnette
- Starring: Adrienne Bailon; Ciara Harris; Sarah Mason; Jennifer Peña; Taylor Cole
- Music by: Kenn Michael
- Country of origin: United States
- Original language: English

Production
- Producers: Leslie Belzberg; Pat Faulstich; Karen Firestone; Max Wong
- Cinematography: Charles Cohen
- Editor: David Beatty
- Running time: 95 minutes
- Production company: MTV Studios

Original release
- Network: MTV
- Release: May 23, 2006

All You've Got is a 2006 American sports drama television film directed by Neema Barnette and starring Ciara Harris and Adrienne Bailon. The film debuted on MTV.

== Synopsis ==
A rivalry between two volleyball teams (the Phantoms and the Madonnas) causes a big catastrophe when the two teams collide.

Gabby Espinoza is captain of the Cathedral High Phantoms volleyball team. Her mother died when she was little, and recently, a fire claimed the life of her firefighter father. Coincidentally, the fire was in the Madonnas' school (the Phantoms' rival).

Having to go to different schools and split up, the three Madonnas Lauren McDonald, Katilin, and Becca chose Cathedral High and joined the volleyball team. Tension forms between Gabby's group Lettie and Rada and the Madonnas, causing them to lose during a volleyball game because of lack of teamwork. This makes the coach furious and he makes a speech about working together as a team and feeling the love. Soon after, the girls begin to warm up to one another and at the same time, winning game after game. Lauren's friendship with the other girls, particularly with Gabby, makes Becca jealous and in a fit of jealousy, she tells Gabby about Lauren and Artie (Gabby's ex-boyfriend) and a rift between the two escalates. During the game, a fight between Gabby and Lauren occurs. The coach tells them to put their own issues aside and focus on the game. After winning, Gabby and Lauren are back on good terms, agreeing that both should concentrate on their games first and deciding afterwards who should get the boy. Before the game starts, Becca puts Melatonin in Gabby's water bottle. Gabby begins to lose focus, the coach suspects she's on drugs and orders her to sit on the bench, replacing her with Becca. Gabby breaks down and the Phantoms win. Becca confesses to Lauren about what she did, with reason that she wanted her father to get to watch her play. She gets kicked off the team and the Phantoms head on to finals.

With determination, hard work and cooperation, the Phantoms win the championship. Becca makes up with Gabby. Gabby and Lauren didn't care about which one of them gets Artie and the girls set off to make their dreams come true.

== Cast ==
- Adrienne Bailon — Gabby Espinoza
- Sarah Wright — Lauren McDonald
- Ciara — Becca Watley
- Jennifer Peña — Letica "Lettie" Morales
- Taylor Cole — Kaitlin
- Jackée Harry — butt shorts salesman
- Daniella Alonso — Rada Kincaid
- Laila Ali — Herself
- T-Bone — announcer
- Barbara Niven — Peggy McDonald
- Faizon Love — Coach Harlan
- Doug Savant — Sam McDonald
- Eduardo Yáñez — Javier Espinoza
- George Rodguriez — assistant volleyball coach
- Brendan Kirsch — madonna volleyball coach
- Michael Dorm — Fireman Captain Diaz
- Julissa Bermudez — cousin Mali
- Efren Ramirez — Carlos
- Parker Torress — Monster
- Renee Victor — Grandmother Rosa
- Michael Copon — Artie Sanchez
- Dominique Ianni - The Setter
- Maya Cornejo - Lettie's little sister

== Soundtrack ==
All You've Got (CD/DVD)

- 1, 2 Step by Ciara
- 12' O Clock by Marques Houston
- Latinos Stand Up by Play-N-Skillz
- Reggaeton Latino by Don Omar
- Summer Nights by Lil Rob
- Baby I'm Back – Baby Bash ft. Akon
- Bounce – T-Bone
- B.O.B - OutKast
- Latin Salsa Mix – T-Bone
- Follow T – T-Bone
- Love Should Be A Crime - Michael Copon
- Obsession – Frankie J
- Pon De Replay – Rihanna
- Oye, Mi Canto - N.O.R.E ft Nina Sky and Tego Calderon
- Where Will I Be – Jennifer Pena
