= Crazy Life =

Crazy Life may refer to:

- Crazy Life (Gino Vannelli album), 1973
- Crazy Life (Lil Rob album), 1997
- "Crazy Life", a single by Toad the Wet Sprocket from Coil, 1997
- "Crazy Life", a song by Tim Rushlow as well as the reissue title of Tim Rushlow (album), 2001

== See also ==
- This Crazy Life, an album by Joanna Pacitti, 2006
- "The Crazy Life", a song by Girls Aloud from their 2006 single "Something Kinda Ooooh"
