= Empire Girls: Julissa and Adrienne =

- Adrienne Bailon (left) and Julissa Bermudez
- Genre: Reality television
- Starring: Adrienne Bailon; Julissa Bermudez
- Country of origin: United States
- No. of seasons: 1
- No. of episodes: 10

Production
- Executive producers: Charles Suitt; Keira Brings; Michael Hirschorn
- Running time: 40–41 minutes
- Production company: Ish Entertainment

Original release
- Network: Style Network
- Release: June 3 – August 26, 2012

Empire Girls: Julissa and Adrienne is an American reality television series that premiered on the Style Network on June 3, 2012. The series follows the lives of rising Latina stars and best friends Julissa Bermudez and Adrienne Bailon as they try to get their big breaks in the entertainment industry.

== Background ==
Julissa and Adrienne met on the set of the 2006 television film All You've Got, where they become fast friends to the point of sharing Adrienne's larger trailer. Since then, they have supported each other through trials and tribulations in life and love. Julissa has hosted several programs for young adults on networks like MTV, BET, and more, including shows like 106 & Park and The Jersey Shore Aftershow. Her ultimate goal is to be a major talk show personality, like Oprah Winfrey. Adrienne has had success as a singer for pop groups 3LW and The Cheetah Girls, as well as an actress. Adrienne's inspiration is Jennifer Lopez, and solidifying her solo singing career is her primary objective. In addition to their career aspirations, the girls are eager to find the right guy to settle down with. Both have high profile exes in the world of sports and entertainment, and try to put their romantic pasts behind them.

== Cast ==
=== Main ===
- Julissa Bermudez
- Adrienne Bailon

=== Recurring ===
- Ashley Weatherspoon
- Layla Kayleigh
- Angie Martinez
- Claudette Bailon Alexander
- Jorge Santos

== Episodes ==
No.	Title	Original release date
1	"Made in New York"	June 3, 2012
Julissa hopes to appeal to a more mainstream audience by working on her accent. Adrienne tries to remove all aspects of her former boyfriend from her life because of its potential interference with her music career.
2	"The Godmother"	June 10, 2012
Adrienne questions her priorities after her sister has a baby. Julissa throws a housewarming to introduce her new love interest to her friends.
3	"Triple Threat, Baby!"	June 17, 2012
Julissa reunites with her ex-fiancé. Adrienne works on rebranding herself with her new label Compound Entertainment under the mentoring of Ne-Yo.
4	"Oh Say Can You See"	June 24, 2012
Adrienne is asked to sing the national anthem at a Knicks game. Meanwhile, Julissa and Adrienne's moms set them up on blind dates. Tensions arise when Ne-yo, Adrienne's music manager, bans Julissa from the studio fearing she is distracting Adrienne from her work in her music career.
5	"Fingertip Fetish"	July 8, 2012
Julissa co-hosts Angie Martinez's national radio show. Meanwhile, Adrienne plans a singles mixer and launches her Fingertip Fetish nail-polish line.
6	"I Kissed a Girl"	July 15, 2012
Julissa recruits her friends to help update her hosting reel for a major gig. Layla considers moving from Los Angeles to New York in an effort to save her marriage, but possibly put her career in shaky, unknown waters. Adrienne explores lesbianism for a possible role in a movie.
7	"It's Hot in Miami"	July 22, 2012
Adrienne and Julissa travel to beautiful Miami to attend the Latin Billboard Music Awards.
8	"Wardrobe Will Malfunction"	July 29, 2012
Adrienne debuts a dress line. Julissa struggles with her body image.
9	"This Baby Stuff Is Scary"	August 19, 2012
Adrienne babysits her niece and has a hell of an interesting time, which leads her to an exploration of freezing her eggs. Julissa auditions for a new role on the new Mundos channel. Later, the girls shoot a public-service announcement for the Latino arts community in New York.
10	"Love at Last?"	August 26, 2012
Adrienne prepares for her dream moment to perform during the famous National Puerto Day Parade in New York. Julissa is sidetracked when she reunites with an old friend who could become her new love interest.
