= Adrienne Bailon-Houghton =

American singer, actress, and television personality

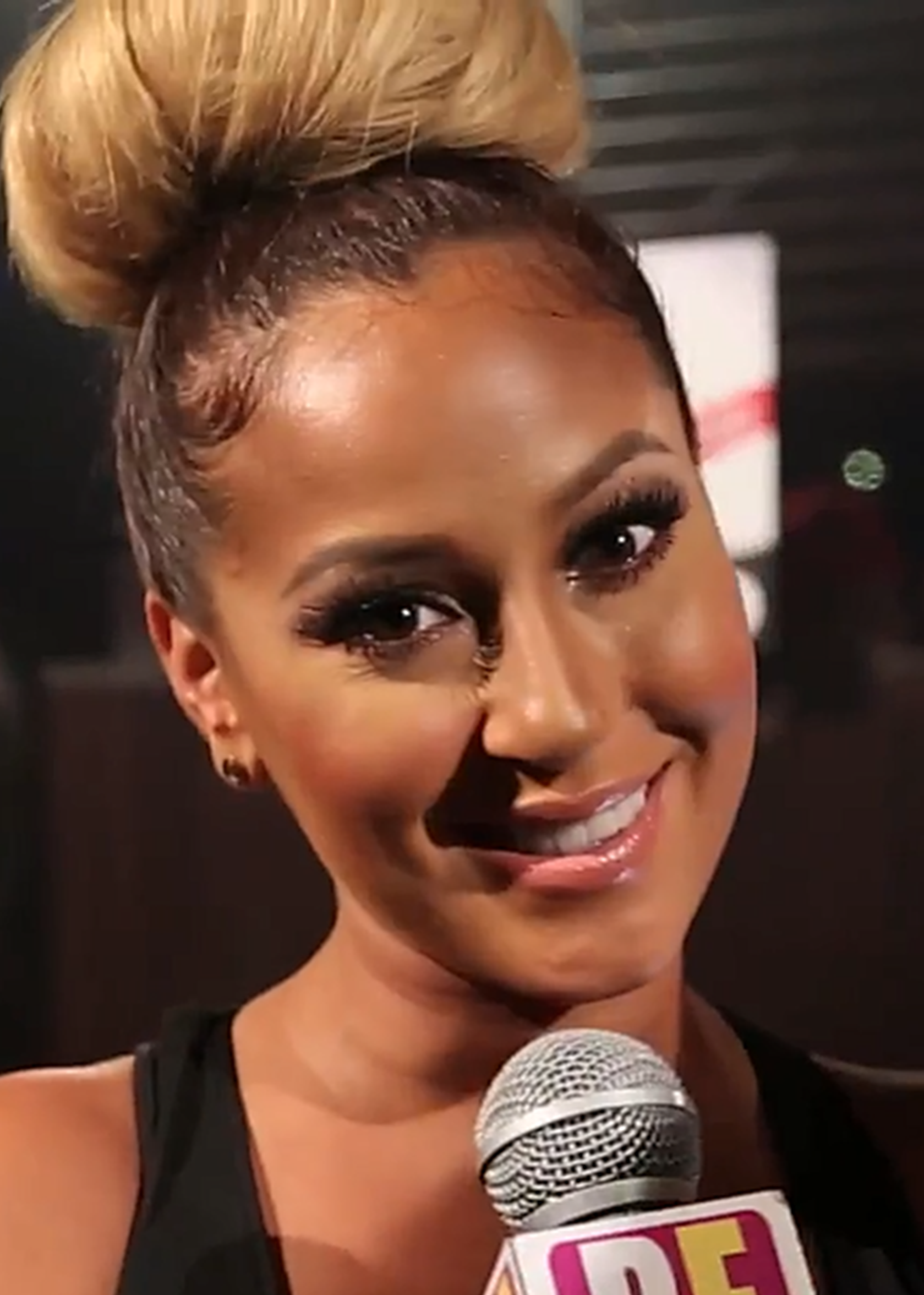
- Bailon during an interview in July 2013
- Born: Adrienne Eliza Bailon; October 24, 1983 (age 43); New York City, U.S.
- Other names: Adrienne Bailon; Adrienne Houghton
- Occupations: Television personality; singer; actress; entrepreneur
- Years active: 1999–present
- Spouse: Israel Houghton (m. 2016)
- Children: 1
- Musical career
- Genres: R&B; pop; Latin; hip hop; dance; gospel
- Labels: Island Def Jam; Compound; Disney; Jive; So So Def
- Formerly of: 3LW; the Cheetah Girls

Adrienne Eliza Bailon-Houghton (née Bailon (/baɪˈloʊn/); born October 24, 1983) is an American television personality, singer, and actress. She was a former member of the girl groups 3LW and The Cheetah Girls. From 2013 to 2022, Bailon co-hosted The Real. For her work on The Real, she became the first Latina host of a daytime talk show in the United States, and earned a Daytime Emmy Award. She also had a stint as co-anchor of the entertainment news show, E! News.

As an actress, Bailon appeared in The Cheetah Girls films, Coach Carter and All You've Got. She has guest starred in numerous television series including That's So Raven as Alana Rivera (a role she reprised for the series' spin-off, Raven's Home), and as herself in The Suite Life of Zack & Cody. In 2019, she competed in The Masked Singer as the Flamingo, finishing in third place.

== Life and career ==
=== 1983–2002: Early life, career beginnings, and 3LW ===
Adrienne Eliza Bailon was born to a Puerto Rican mother, Nilda Alicea and an Ecuadorian father, Freddie Bailón, on October 24, 1983. She grew up on the Lower East Side of Manhattan. Bailon has an older sister, Claudette. She attended PS 110-The Monitor in Brooklyn and the High School for Health Professions and Human Services, but did not pursue a career in the medical field because of her musical endeavors. Bailon commented "I really wanted to be an obstetrician! I wanted to bring babies into the world..." Bailon was discovered by Latin pop singer Ricky Martin in October 1999 while she was performing in a church choir at Madison Square Garden. Martin asked for the four best singers in the group, and Bailon was one of the four elected by Martin to perform as back-up singers as part of his Livin' la Vida Loca Tour concert show later that night.

Following the performance, Bailon became a member of the girl group 3LW, joining Kiely Williams and Naturi Naughton, the other two members of the group. Bailon stated that she was spotted by a producer while on a field trip to Beth Israel, and was later offered a slot in the female trio. Bailon said "... coming from very humble beginnings in the projects of the Lower East Side and not having any "Hollywood" connections.... It did not seem realistic. I sang in church, acted in all the church and school plays.... So when the opportunity came to join a girl group I was ready!"

With the original line-up of 3LW formed, the group was signed to Epic Records, and work on their debut album began in 1999. Their first single, "No More (Baby I'ma Do Right)", was released in the fall of 2000. "No More" was a chart success, and was followed by "Playas Gon' Play" in early 2001. The group's self-titled debut album, 3LW was released on November 14, 2000. The album went on to be certified platinum by the RIAA, selling 1.3 million copies in the United States.

3LW returned in the summer of 2002 with the single "I Do (Wanna Get Close To You)", featuring Loon. That same summer, the group performed a concert special on Nickelodeon titled Live on Sunset. By August, the group was set to release their sophomore LP, A Girl Can Mack, when member Naughton left the group, alleging that she had a number of conflicts and arguments with Bailon, Williams, and their management. The album's release date was pushed back a month and debuted at No. 15 on the Billboard 200 with 53,000 copies sold its first week. Following Naughton's departure, Williams and Bailon decided to continue 3LW as a duo, causing the press to jokingly refer to them as "2LW". After A Girl Can Mack's second single "Neva Get Enuf" underperformed, 3LW released their Christmas-themed third studio album Naughty or Nice, which failed to appear on any major Billboard charts.

=== 2003–2008: The Cheetah Girls, 3LW disbandment, and acting career ===
Beginning in late 2002, 3LW held nationwide auditions for a new third member. Jessica "J" Benson was selected and with Benson, the group continued to promote A Girl Can Mack and began working on their third studio album. In June, 3LW departed from Epic Records and signed with So So Def.

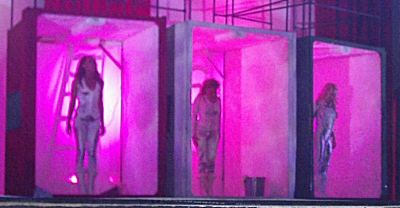
The Cheetah Girls performing during their Christmas tour in 2005

Amidst 3LW's public drama, Bailon and Williams signed on to star in the Disney Channel Original Movie, The Cheetah Girls. They starred as two of four members of a girl group named after the film, with Raven-Symoné and Sabrina Bryan portraying the final two members. The movie premiered in August 2003. Upon release, the film was the number one rated basic cable telecast and premiered to 6.5 million viewers, a record for Disney at the time. The film's soundtrack was certified double platinum by the RIAA. In 2003 and 2004, Bailon had a supporting role on the second season of Disney Channel's That's So Raven in which she played Alana, a personal enemy of the show's title character. In 2005, she appeared as Dominique in Coach Carter, her first theatrically released film.

The success of The Cheetah Girls film prompted Disney to turn the project into a real girl group, composed of Williams, Bailon, and Bryan. Raven was offered a spot in the group but opted to focus on her solo career. Bailon noted that both The Cheetah Girls and 3LW projects would continue concurrently. As a trio, the Cheetah Girls began working on their first studio album, Cheetah-licious Christmas, which was released in 2005. Bailon then starred in the MTV film All You've Got, along with R&B singer Ciara. It was released on DVD in May 2006 and premiered on MTV.

The release of 3LW's third studio album, tentatively titled Phoenix Rising in 2003 and later Point of No Return in 2005, was delayed several times. On August 15, 2006, the group released the single "Feelin' You", but it did not impact any major charts. Point of No Return was shelved and Bailon and Williams continued with The Cheetah Girls. 3LW officially disbanded in 2007.

In April 2006, the Cheetah Girls began filming the sequel musical film The Cheetah Girls 2. Raven-Symoné returned for the film, which was shot on location in Barcelona, Spain. The Cheetah Girls 2 premiered on August 26, 2006, and received over 8.1 million viewers, making it the highest-rated premiere for a Disney Channel Original Movie at the time. The film's soundtrack album was certified platinum by the RIAA. The Cheetah Girls released their second studio album TCG on September 25, 2007, which featured the single "Fuego".

In January 2008, filming commenced on the third Cheetah Girls film,The Cheetah Girls: One World, in which the group appeared as a trio without Raven-Symoné. The Cheetah Girls: One World premiered on August 22, 2008 and its soundtrack was released on August 19. While the film was a ratings hit, debuting with 6.2 million viewers, the soundtrack failed to match the success of their previous soundtrack releases and sold 140,000 copies in its first two months. Bailon recorded the solo songs "Stand Up" and "What If" for the film's soundtrack album. In late December 2008, the group disbanded.

=== 2009–2013: Empire Girls, I'm in Love with a Church Girl ===
Following the breakup of the Cheetah Girls, Bailon was signed to Columbia Records. Making the initial announcement in a radio interview in New York City, Bailon later confirmed the news on her official Twitter page, stating: "For everyone who wasn't in [New York] – I officially announced I have signed a solo deal with Sony's Columbia Records! So happy I'm finally able to tell you guys..." Bailon began working on her debut studio album shortly after signing with the label. Her first official musical releases were the songs "Uncontrollable" and "Big Spender", both of which were featured on the Confessions of a Shopaholic film soundtrack, released in 2009. The soundtrack featured songs from numerous artists, including Lady Gaga and the Pussycat Dolls. Later that year, she was featured in the Ghostface Killah song "I'll Be That", featured on his eighth studio album Ghostdini: Wizard of Poetry in Emerald City.

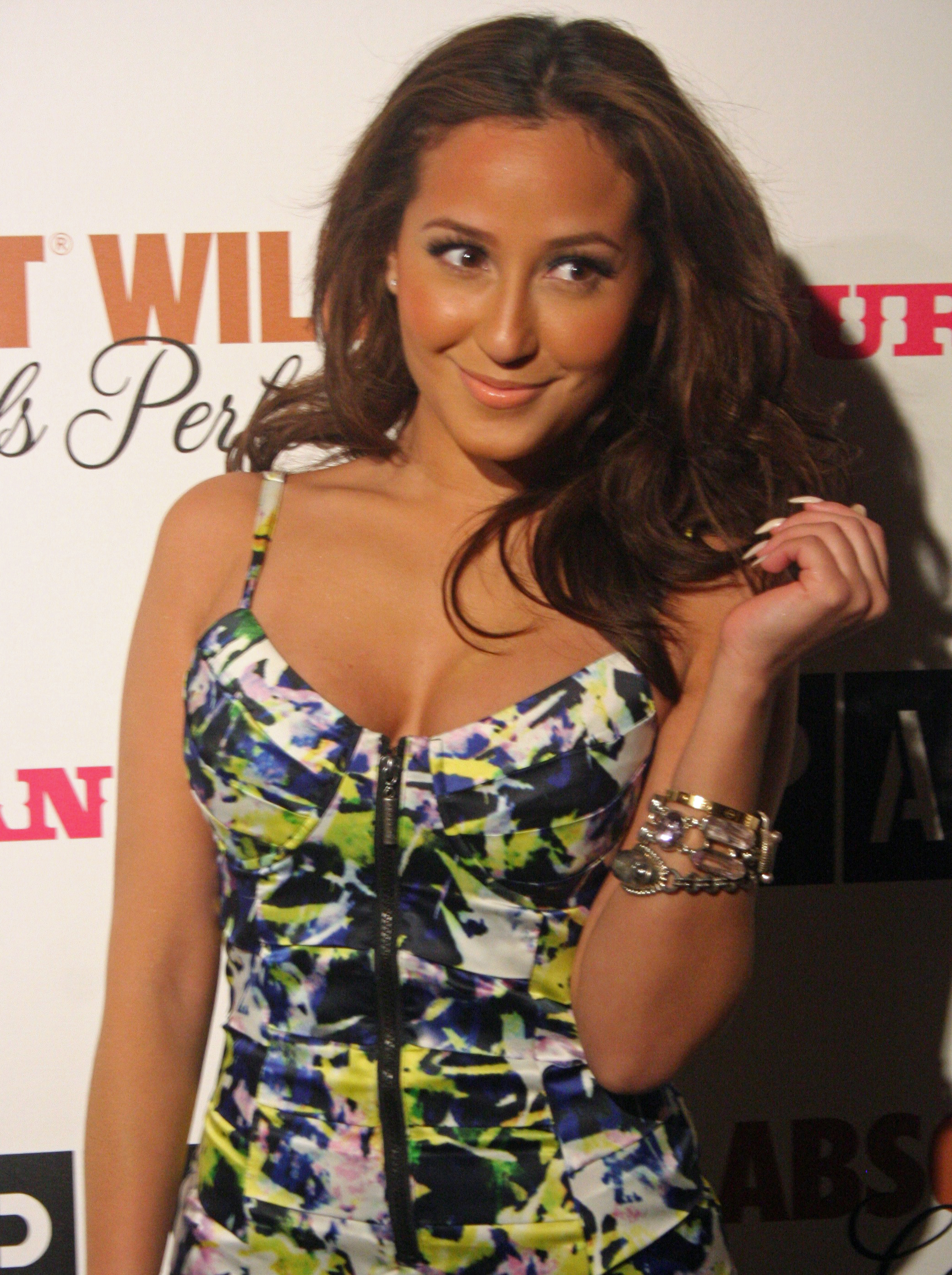
Bailon in March 2011

In 2009, Bailon ended her relationship with her boyfriend of two years, Rob Kardashian, the brother of Kim Kardashian. While dating Rob, Bailon appeared as Rob's girlfriend in a total of eight episodes of the reality series Keeping Up with the Kardashians. The show saw Bailon and Kardashian get tattoos with one another, among other aspects of their relationship. On the breakup, Bailon stated "You know they say opposites attract. I'm a real New Yorker [...] Sometimes I think the things that matter to us were different." Though the reasoning was not announced at the time of the breakup, it was later revealed that Rob had cheated on Bailon during their relationship, which was the ultimate reason they broke up. At the end of 2008, Bailon had appeared on MTV New Year's show from Times Square, in advance promotion of her upcoming afternoon hosting on the channel. In 2009, Bailon hosted the programming block New Afternoons on MTV, relocating to New York City for the job. That same year, she co-hosted MTV News Presents: Top 9 of '09, the year-end MTV New Year's programming live from inside and outside MTV Studios in Times Square. In 2012, Bailon announced that she was taking part in the reality show Empire Girls: Julissa and Adrienne, which would revolve around Bailon and friend Julissa Bermudez. Bailon said of the show's premise, "The show follows us wanting to take our careers to the next level, coming back to New York City, where we’re originally from [...] to take our careers to that next level." The show premiered on June 3, 2012 and became a ratings success for Style Network. Bailon later appeared in the music video for Pitbull's "Give Me Everything".

On November 1, 2012, Bailon appeared alongside Jesse Giddings and Jim Cantiello, as the co-host of The Pepsi Pre-show Live, a podcast that was sponsored by Pepsi, and broadcast through The X Factor website one hour before every episode in the live rounds of the show. Also in 2012, Bailon separated from Island Def Jam due to creative differences. Bailon portrayed Katalina Santiago in the film, The Coalition, which was released on DVD and Blu-ray in February 2013. Bailon appeared in the ABC Family television movie, Lovestruck: The Musical, on April 21, 2013. It showcased Bailon singing the Madonna classic, "Like a Virgin" with Sara Paxton and Chelsea Kane. Other songs Bailon sang in the film include a song titled "Everlasting Love", featuring Paxton, Kane, and Drew Seeley. Bailon starred alongside Ja Rule in the film I'm in Love with a Church Girl, which was released in October 2013.

=== 2013–2022: The Real, The Masked Singer, and E! News ===
From 2013 to 2022, Bailon served as one of the co-hosts of the syndicated daytime talk show The Real originally alongside Tamar Braxton, Loni Love, Jeannie Mai, and Tamera Mowry. The show premiered on July 15, 2013. Following a trial summer run during 2013 on the Fox Television Stations group, it was picked up to series the following year. Bailon became the first Latina host of a daytime talk show in the US. Bailon and her co-hosts won the Daytime Emmy Award for Outstanding Entertainment Talk Show Host for their work in 2018.

In 2014, Bailon became the host of a competition show called Nail'd It! on Oxygen. The show was canceled after one season.

In 2015, she made a cameo on the series Being Mary Jane. On November 17, 2017, Bailon released her debut solo album New Tradiciones, a Christmas album with both English and Spanish songs. New Tradiciones would quickly reach number 1 on the Latin charts.

In November 2018, Bailon launched a jewelry line named XIXI. She also owns a vegan handbag line named La Voûte.

In 2019, Bailon was revealed to be "Flamingo" in the second season of The Masked Singer where she finished in third place.

On October 20, 2022, E! announced that E! News would be revived as a late-night entertainment news program and return to the E! network after a two-year hiatus; Bailon-Houghton and Justin Sylvester (who returned to the show for its revival) served as co-hosts when it premiered on November 14. On October 31, 2023, Bailon-Houghton announced she was resigning as co-anchor due to wanting to spend more time with her family and living on the East coast.

=== 2022–present: Return to acting ===
In 2022, Bailon made her return to acting, reprising her role of Alana on the fifth season of the That's So Raven's sequel series Raven's Home, where she is now Bayside High School's principal. On January 28, 2025, Bailon was cast in the musical adaptation of the 2006 film Take The Lead. The musical made its debut at the Paper Mill Playhouse in Millburn, New Jerseyon April 6, 2025. Bailon made her return to film in the 2026 Roku Channel original film Chef's Kiss, staring alongside Tim Robards. At the 67th Annual Grammy Awards, Bailon took home the award for "Best Contemporary Christian Music Album" alongside her husband Israel Houghton and artist New Breed for Coritos Vol. 1, becoming the first artists to win in the category with a spanish language album. On July 8, 2026 Bailon was announced to be reprising her role as Chanel Simmons in a forth installment of The Cheetah Girls film series alongside Raven-Symoné and Sabrina Bryan.

== Personal life ==
On January 26, 2015, Bailon announced on The Real the reason why she had not released her debut solo album at that point. She stated that she was "scared to fail" and that she did not like the sound of her own voice because executives at Disney praised the fact that she sounded "so young". Bailon expressed that when she got her solo record deal at Def Jam, things didn't go the way she expected.

Bailon is a Christian. When asked "Do you relate with I'm in Love with a Church Girl and not get involve[d] with the sins and craziness that Hollywood is all about?", she replied, "I think I've definitely tried. No one is left without a sin. Everyone sin [sic] in their own different ways. Never judge one person's sins to be greater and lesser than your own. One thing I'm so grateful for was my foundation in faith. It kept me away from a lot of things like drugs that I never had an interest. I always had my faith in God. My relationship with God helped me to get along not to get caught up in those things.

=== Relationships ===
Bailon dated Rob Kardashian, from 2007 until 2009, when they went their separate ways after Kardashian's infidelity.

On February 5, 2015, Bailon announced that she was engaged to her boyfriend of six years, music executive Lenny Santiago. In September 2015, the couple split and called off their engagement.

Bailon announced her engagement to singer Israel Houghton on August 12, 2016 after six months of dating. They were married in Paris on November 11, 2016.

On August 5, 2022, Adrienne Bailon announced the birth of her first child with her husband via surrogate; Israel Houghton has six children from three previous relationships.

== Discography ==
=== Studio albums ===
Title	Album details	Peak positions
Title	Album details	US Latin
New Tradiciones	Released: November 17, 2017; Labels: Bridge Music; Format: CD, digital download	23

=== Guest appearances ===
List of non-single guest appearances, with other performing artists, showing year released and album name
Title	Year	Other performer(s)	Album
"No Me Digas Que No"	2004	Enemigo	Caminando
"War (Extended Version)"	2007	Edwin Starr, Jackie Chan, Chris Tucker	Rush Hour 3
"No Me Digas Que No"	2007	Xtreme	Haciendo Historia: Platinum Edition
"Stand Up"	2008	—N/a	The Cheetah Girls: One World
"What If" (credited as Chanel)	2008	—N/a	The Cheetah Girls: One World
"Uncontrollable"	2009	—N/a	Confessions of a Shopaholic
"Big Spender"	2009	—N/a	Confessions of a Shopaholic
"I'll Be That"	2009	Ghostface Killah	Ghostdini: Wizard of Poetry in Emerald City
"Come With Me"	2012	Daddy Yankee, Prince Royce, Elijah King	Prestige
"Like A Virgin"	2013	Sara Paxton, Chelsea Kane	Lovestruck: The Musical
"Everlasting Love"	2013	Sara Paxton, Chelsea Kane, Drew Seeley	Lovestruck: The Musical
"Days Go By"	2013	Duane Harden, Gilbere Forte	#NB4U (Naked Before You)
"I'm With You/Be Still"	2018	Israel Houghton	The Road to DeMaskUs

== Filmography ==
=== Film ===
List of film credits
Year	Title	Role	Notes
2005	Coach Carter	Dominique	Credited as Adrienne Eliza Bailon
2008	Cuttin' da Mustard	Erma	
2008	The Sisterhood of the Traveling Pants 2	Cute Video Couple Girl	Cameo
2012	The Coalition	Katalina Santiago	Direct-to-video
2013	I'm in Love with a Church Girl	Vanessa Leon	
2026	Chef's Kiss	Lauren Navarro	Also executive producer; also released as From Italy with Love

=== Television ===
List of television credits
Year	Title	Role	Notes
2001	Taina	Gia	Episode: "Blue Mascara"
2001	The Jersey	Herself	Episode: "Speaking of Coleman"
2002	All That	Herself	Episode: "3LW" (uncredited)
2003	The Cheetah Girls	Chanel "Chuchie" Simmons	Television film
2003–2004	That's So Raven	Alana Rivera	Recurring role; 4 episodes
2005	Taylor Made	Madison Santos	Television film
2005	Buffalo Dreams	Domino	Television film
2006	All You've Got	Gabby Espinoza	Television film
2006	The Cheetah Girls 2	Chanel "Chuchie" Simmons	Television film
2007–2008	Disney Channel Games	Herself	
2008–2011	Keeping Up with the Kardashians	Herself	13 episodes
2008	The Cheetah Girls: One World	Chanel "Chuchie" Simmons	Television film
2008	The Suite Life of Zack & Cody	Herself; with The Cheetah Girls	
2008	Studio DC: Almost Live	Herself; with The Cheetah Girls	
2008	MTV New Year's	Herself	Times Square Correspondent
2009–2010	New Afternoons on MTV	Herself	Host
2009–2010	MTV New Year's (MTV News Presents: Top 9 of '09)	Herself	Host
2011	Kourtney and Kim Take New York	Herself	Episode: "In a New York Minute"
2011	Celebrity Nightmares Decoded	Herself	Episode 2
2012	Empire Girls: Julissa and Adrienne	Herself	Main role
2013	Lovestruck: The Musical	Noelle	Television film
2013–2022	The Real	Herself	Talk show; co-host & producer
2013–2014	Big Morning Buzz Live	Herself	Weekly special guest correspondent
2014	Celebrities Undercover	Herself	Episode: "Adrienne Bailon & Chilli"
2014	Nail'd It!	Herself	
2014	I Love The 2000s	Herself	
2014	My Crazy Love	Herself	Episode: "Tina & Adrienne"
2015	Knock Knock Live	Herself	Co-host; season 1, episode 2
2015	Being Mary Jane	Herself	Episode 10 season 3 "Some Things Are Black and White"
2016	Cupcake Wars	Herself	Episode: "Celebrity: Josie and the Pussycats"
2018	Famous in Love	Herself	Episode: "The Players"
2018	Celebrity Family Feud	Herself	Episode: "Aly Michalka & AJ Michalka vs. Adrienne Houghton"
2018–2023	All Things Adrienne	Herself	Host; web series
2019	The Masked Singer	Flamingo (third place)	Season two; 12 episodes
2020–2024	I Can See Your Voice	Herself	Regular Panelist
2022	Raven's Home	Alana Rivera	Recurring role; Season 5
2022	The Real Housewives of Beverly Hills	Herself	Episode: "It Takes A Villain"
2022–2023	E! News	Herself	Co-anchor
2022–present	Love Always, Adrienne	Host; web series	
2023	Miss USA 2023	Herself	Host
2027	The Cheetah Girls: Next Gen	Chanel Simmons	Filming

=== Theater ===
Year	Title	Role	Notes
2025	Take the Lead	Arianna	Paper Mill Playhouse

=== Music videos ===
Year	Title	Artist(s)
2002	"Crush Tonight"	Fat Joe
2004	"Radio"	Jarvis
2004	"Blow Your Whistle"	Morgan Smith
2009	"A Toast to the Good Life"	Fabolous
2009	"Everything, Everyday, Everywhere"	Fabolous
2011	"Give Me Everything"	Pitbull
2013	"Sexy People"	Pitbull
2013	"Sunday Kinda Love"	Israel Houghton
2016	"Where's the Love?"	The Black Eyed Peas featuring The World
2018	"Secrets"	Israel & Adrienne Houghton

== Awards and nominations ==
Note: The year given is the year of the ceremony

Year	Association	Category	Nominated work	Result
2001	BET Award	Best Female Group	3LW	Nominated
2001	Teen Choice Award	Choice Breakout Artist	3LW	Nominated
2001	Teen Choice Award	Choice Pop Group	3LW	Nominated
2001	Soul Train Lady of Soul Award	R&B/Soul Album of the Year – Group, Band or Duo	3LW	Won
2001	Soul Train Lady of Soul Award	Best R&B/Soul or Rap New Artist – Group, Band or Duo	"No More (Baby I'ma Do Right)"	Won
2001	Soul Train Lady of Soul Award	Best R&B/Soul Single – Group, Band or Duo	"No More (Baby I'ma Do Right)"	Nominated
2003	Soul Train Lady of Soul Award	Best R&B/Soul Single – Group, Band or Duo	"I Do (Wanna Get Close to You)"	Nominated
2003	Source Award	Best Female R&B Act	3LW	Nominated
2016	Daytime Emmy Award	Outstanding Entertainment Talk Show Host (shared with Tamar Braxton, Loni Love, Jeannie Mai, and Tamera Mowry-Housley)	The Real	Nominated
2017	Daytime Emmy Award	Outstanding Entertainment Talk Show Host (shared with Tamar Braxton, Loni Love, Jeannie Mai, and Tamera Mowry-Housley)	The Real	Nominated
2018	Daytime Emmy Award	Outstanding Entertainment Talk Show Host (shared with Love, Mai, and Mowry-Housley)	The Real	Won
2018	People's Choice Award	The Daytime Talk Show of 2018	The Real	Nominated
2018	NAACP Image Award	Outstanding Talk Series (shared with Love, Mai, and Mowry-Housley)	The Real	Won
2019	NAACP Image Award	Outstanding Talk Series (shared with Love, Mai, and Mowry-Housley)	The Real	Won
2019	Daytime Emmy Award	Outstanding Entertainment Talk Show Host (shared with Love, Mai, and Mowry-Housley)	The Real	Nominated
2019	Daytime Emmy Award	Outstanding Musical Performance in a Daytime Program (shared with Israel Houghton)	"Secrets”	Nominated
2025	GMA Dove Award	Spanish Language Recorded Song of the Year	"Coritos de Fuego" (with Israel & New Breed, Unified Sound, Nate Diaz, Aaron Moses, and Lucia Parker)	Won
