= Still Smokin =

Still Smokin or Still Smokin' may refer to:

- Still Smokin (film), a 1983 American comedy film by Cheech and Chong
- Still Smokin (Lil Rob album), 2000, or the title song
- Still Smokin', a 1992 album by The Marshall Tucker Band
- Still Smokin', a 2012 album by Brownsville Station
- Still Smokin', an unauthorized release of the Doobie Brothers On Our Way Up
- "Still Smokin'", a song by Kottonmouth Kings from Hidden Stash III
