= The Masked Singer (American TV series) season 2 =

Season of television series

The Masked Singer
- Season 2
- Promotional poster for season two, featuring "Skeleton", "Flamingo", "Leopard", and "Egg"
- Starring: Ken Jeong; Jenny McCarthy Wahlberg; Nicole Scherzinger; Robin Thicke
- Hosted by: Nick Cannon
- No. of contestants: 16
- Winner: Wayne Brady as "Fox"
- Runner-up: Chris Daughtry as "Rottweiler"
- No. of episodes: 14

Release
- Original network: Fox
- Original release: September 25 – December 18, 2019

Season chronology
- ← Previous; Season 1 Next → Season 3

The second season of the American television series The Masked Singer premiered on Fox on September 25, 2019, following a "special sneak peek" aired on September 15, and concluded on December 18, 2019. The season was won by actor/comedian Wayne Brady as "Fox", with singer Chris Daughtry finishing second as "Rottweiler", and singer/talk show host Adrienne Bailon-Houghton placing third as "Flamingo".

== Production ==
For the season, which featured 16 new costumes, Toybina says her goals were to increase the production quality, emphasize their backstories and increase their mobility. Tree was experimental; Toybina and her team challenged themselves to question "what fabric can do" by creating something new and different. Meanwhile, Fox was steampunk-inspired and the Penguin's mask was chromed in silver. Ice Cream was also innovative; the costume was formed during a complicated process of sculpting the head "out of foam and [waxing it] onto the shoulder." As opposed to stereotypical black and red accents, Toybina wanted to create a sleek costume for Black Widow by experimenting with texture and movement for its design. Similarly, rather than designing the expected appearance of a Leopard, Toybina relegated animal print to the costume's mask only and instead created a vintage look with a Victorian dress and large collar. Toybina says she wanted to push the boundaries of costume design by creating a "theatrical environment" made of petals surrounding the face mask of the Flower. In order to confuse viewers, the celebrity inside the Flamingo saw out of a peephole in the neck instead of the head to hide their true height.

Movie and cultural influences were also present in the season; the hippie-like Eagle embodied Americana and was influenced by rock musicians Jimi Hendrix and Bruce Springsteen, while Skeleton was heavily inspired by the character Jack Skellington of Tim Burton's 1993 film The Nightmare Before Christmas. The Panda was imagined as a playful costume that would appeal to younger viewers of the show as the necklace was inspired by gumball machines and the clothing Harajuku-like. The Egg costume, which was requested by a contestant, was described as "somewhere between the runway and Lady Gaga." It incorporated egg features in four different ways: the costume's mask was a boiled egg, the hat was a fried egg, the intricacy of the breastplate (which was hand-beaded) represented a Fabergé egg, and the overcoat resembled a cracked eggshell. Toybina inserted the beads and stones into the Butterfly costume by hand, which she says transforms the costume's darkness and sex appeal into beauty onstage.

Increasing the mobility of the celebrities inside the costumes was also a focus of the season's designs, Toybina said. For safety purposes, she had to reduce the extravagance of Ladybug's face mask to make it tight to the face and instead accentuated the volume of the body of the costume. Alternatively, the mask is the main feature of the street-inspired Rottweiler costume to allow the celebrity to move freely onstage. One of the last costumes that was created for the season was Thingamajig, which Toybina says resembles a grandfather and an elf with its long bead and ears. Contrary to popular belief, Toybina insists the costume was not made to resemble asparagus, rather, it was born out of pure creativity.

Filming occurred from July 1 to August 9, 2019. Toybina won a Costume Designers Guild Award in the Excellence in Variety, Reality-Competition, Live Television category in recognition of her work on the finale. Also starting with this season, Fox Entertainment took production of the show over from Endemol Shine North America, with the show falling under the Fox Alternative Entertainment label. It also allowed the show to be produced in-house.

== Panelists and host ==
Season 2 panelists and host

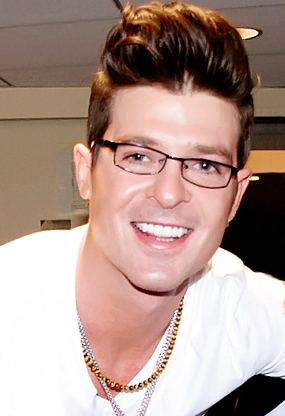
Robin Thicke

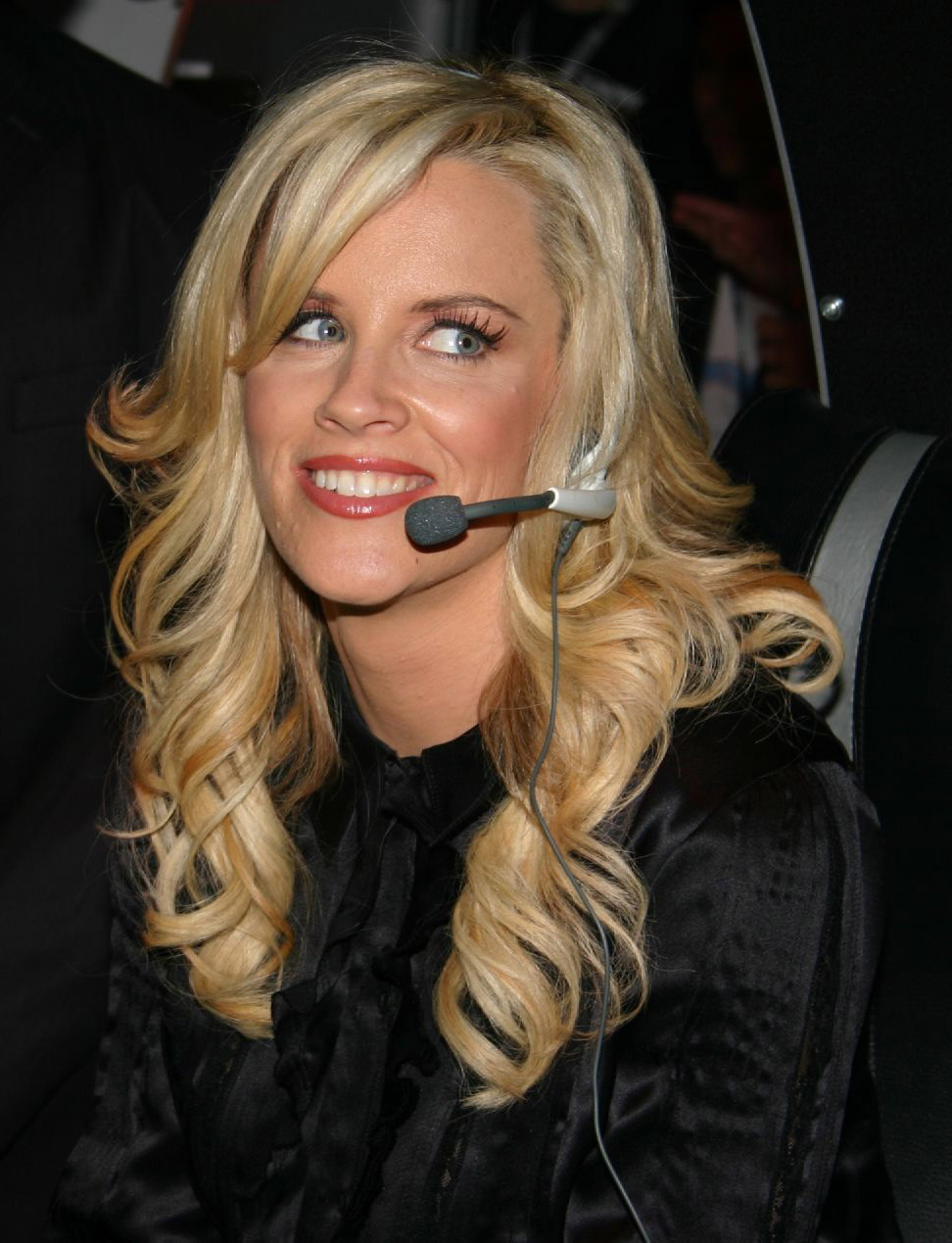
Jenny McCarthy Wahlberg

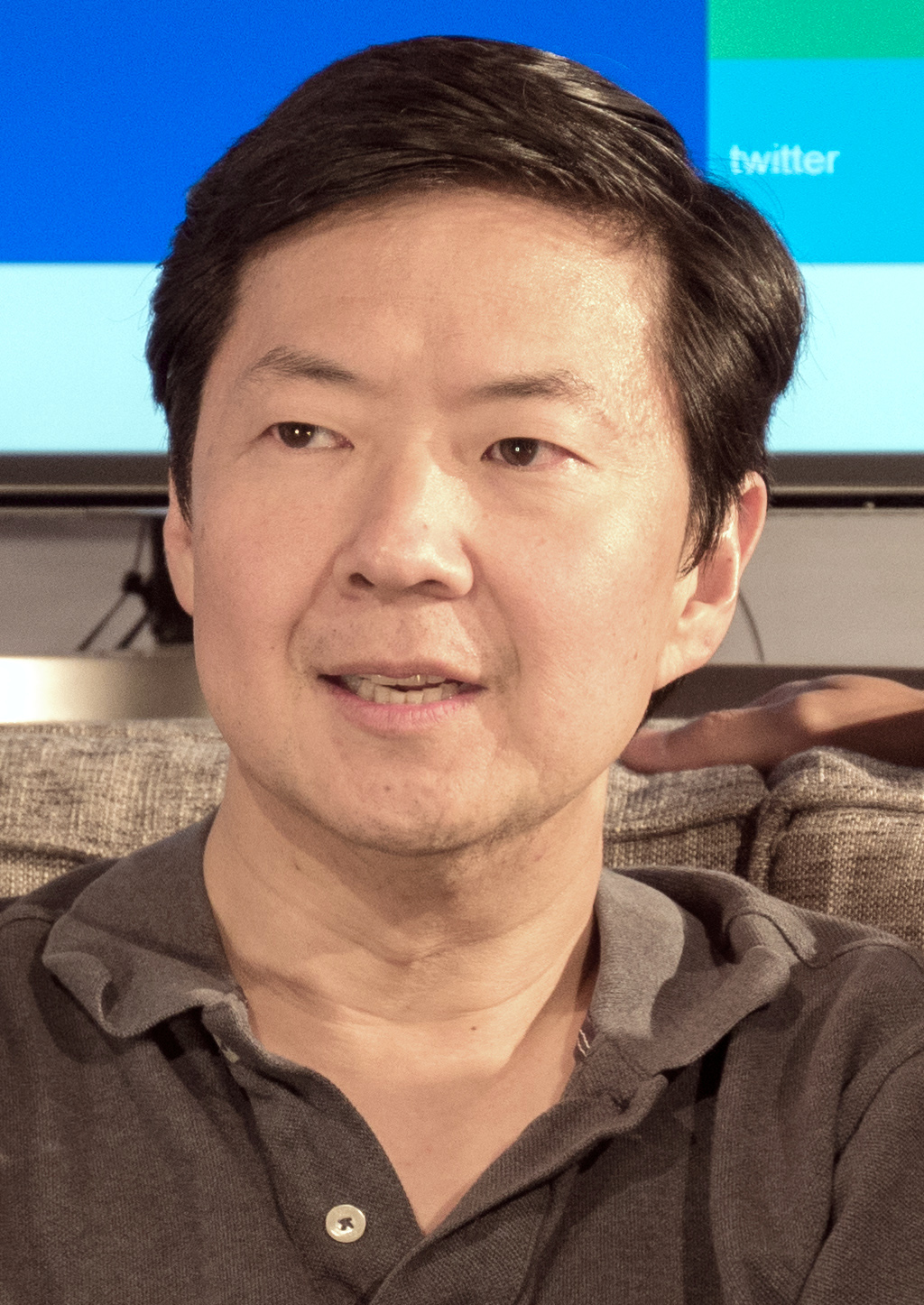
Ken Jeong

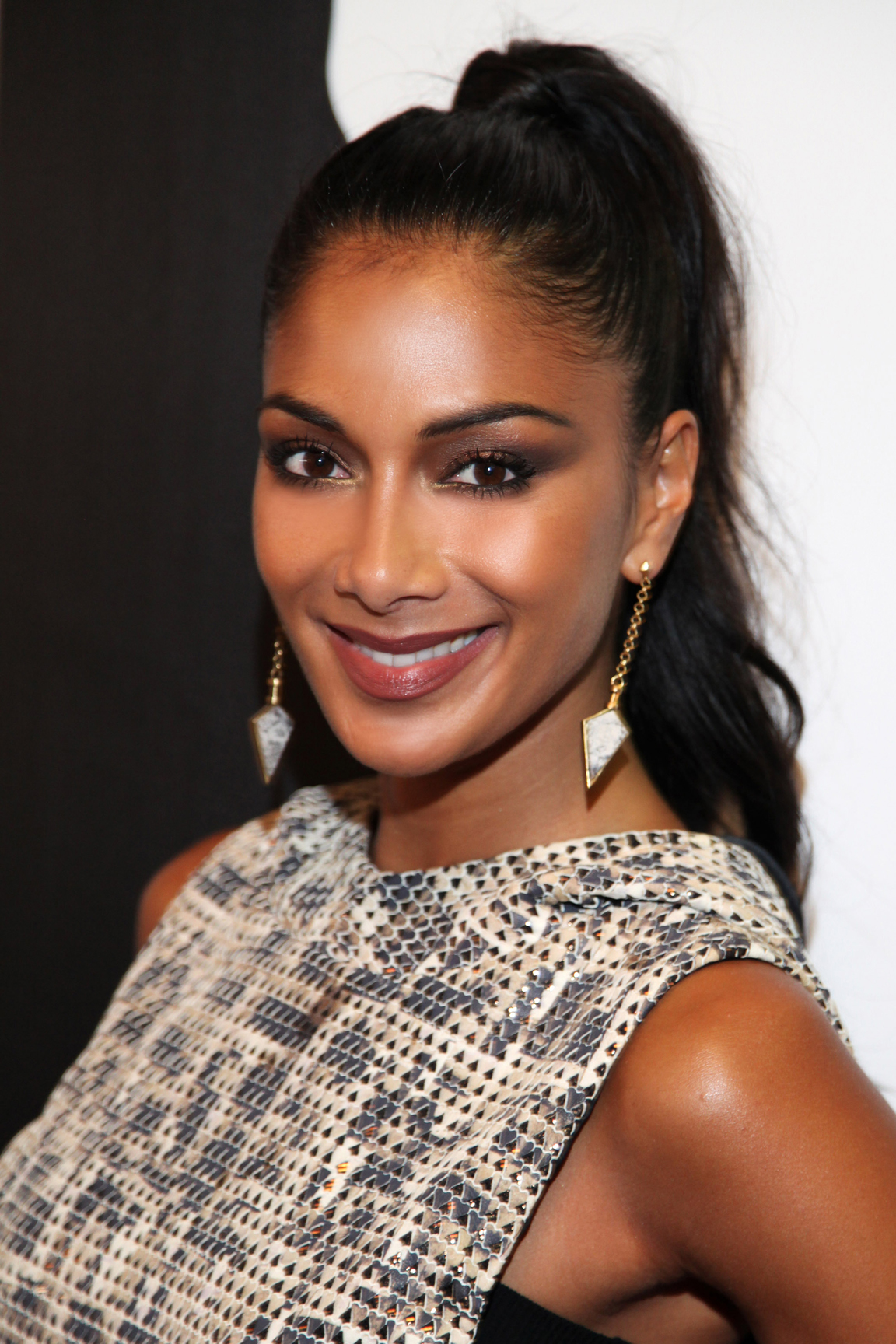
Nicole Scherzinger

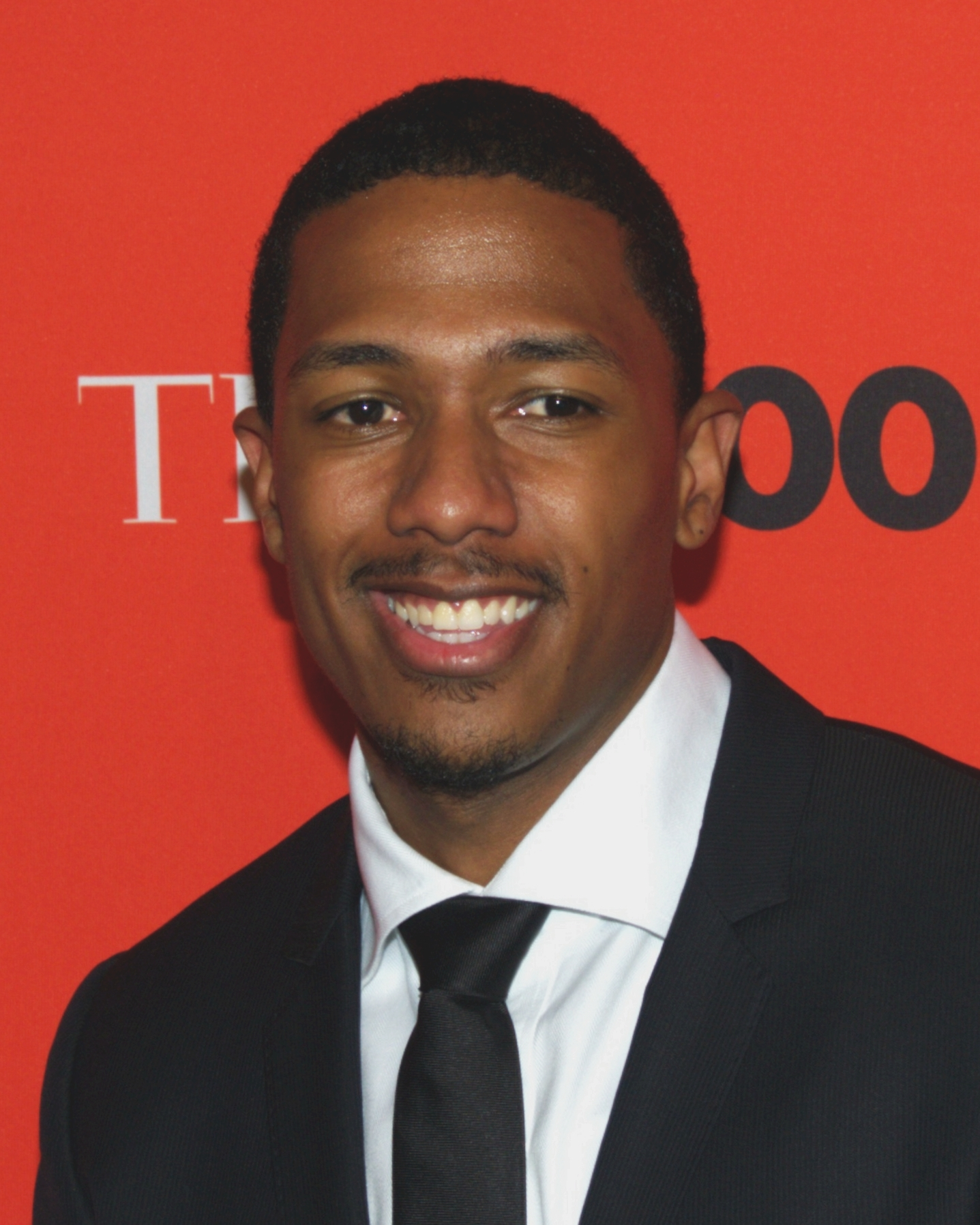
Nick Cannon

Singer-songwriter Robin Thicke, television personality Jenny McCarthy Wahlberg, actor and comedian Ken Jeong, and recording artist Nicole Scherzinger returned as panelists. Nick Cannon once again returned as host.

Almost Family cast members Brittany Snow, Megalyn Echikunwoke, and Emily Osment appeared in the audience in the second episode, while Anthony Anderson was a guest panelist in the sixth episode, Triumph the Insult Comic Dog (Robert Smigel) was a guest panelist in the seventh episode, Joel McHale returned as a guest panelist in the eighth and ninth episodes, and season one winner T-Pain returned to the show as a guest panelist in the tenth episode.

== Contestants ==
The competitors were said to have achieved 140 films, 69 Emmy Award nominations, 42 Grammy Award nominations, 31 Billboard #1 singles, 22 Broadway shows, 20 platinum records, 19 Emmys wins, 15 marriages, eight divorces, seven Super Bowl appearances, six multi-platinum records, five Hall of Fame honors, three New York Times Best Sellers, and two Time 100 honors.

The Season 2 winner, Wayne Brady, had been asked to be on the first season of the show, but turned it down at the time. He said he felt viewers would tune in "not because they want to see the talent, but because they want to see the train wreck." After he saw the success of the first season and getting approval from his daughter and ex-wife, he joined in for the second season.

Stage name	Celebrity	Occupation	Episodes												
Stage name	Celebrity	Occupation	1		2	3	4	5	6	7	8	9	10	11	13
Stage name	Celebrity	Occupation	Group A	Group B	Group C	Group D	4	5	6	7	8	9	10	11	13
Fox	Wayne Brady	Actor/comedian				WIN		SAFE		SAFE		WIN	SAFE	SAFE	WINNER
Rottweiler	Chris Daughtry	Singer		WIN				SAFE		SAFE	WIN		SAFE	SAFE	RUNNER-UP
Flamingo	Adrienne Bailon-Houghton	Singer/talk show host			WIN		SAFE		SAFE		WIN		SAFE	SAFE	THIRD
Leopard	Seal	Singer			RISK		SAFE		SAFE		RISK		SAFE	OUT	
Thingamajig	Victor Oladipo	NBA player	WIN				SAFE		SAFE			RISK	SAFE	OUT	
Tree	Ana Gasteyer	Actor/comedian		WIN				SAFE		SAFE		WIN	OUT		
Butterfly	Michelle Williams	Singer	WIN				SAFE		SAFE			OUT			
Flower	Patti LaBelle	Singer				WIN		SAFE		SAFE	OUT				
Ladybug	Kelly Osbourne	TV personality		RISK				SAFE		OUT					
Black Widow	Raven-Symoné	Actor			WIN		SAFE		OUT						
Penguin	Sherri Shepherd	Comedian				RISK		OUT							
Skeleton	Paul Shaffer	Bandleader	RISK				OUT								
Eagle	Dr. Drew Pinsky	Celebrity doctor				OUT									
Panda	Laila Ali	Boxer			OUT										
Ice Cream	Tyler "Ninja" Blevins	Professional gamer		OUT											
Egg	Johnny Weir	Figure skater	OUT												

The masked singer won their face-off and remained in the competition.
The masked singer lost their face-off and was in the bottom two, but was not eliminated.
The masked singer was safe from elimination.
The masked singer was eliminated from the competition and unmasked.
The masked singer did not perform.
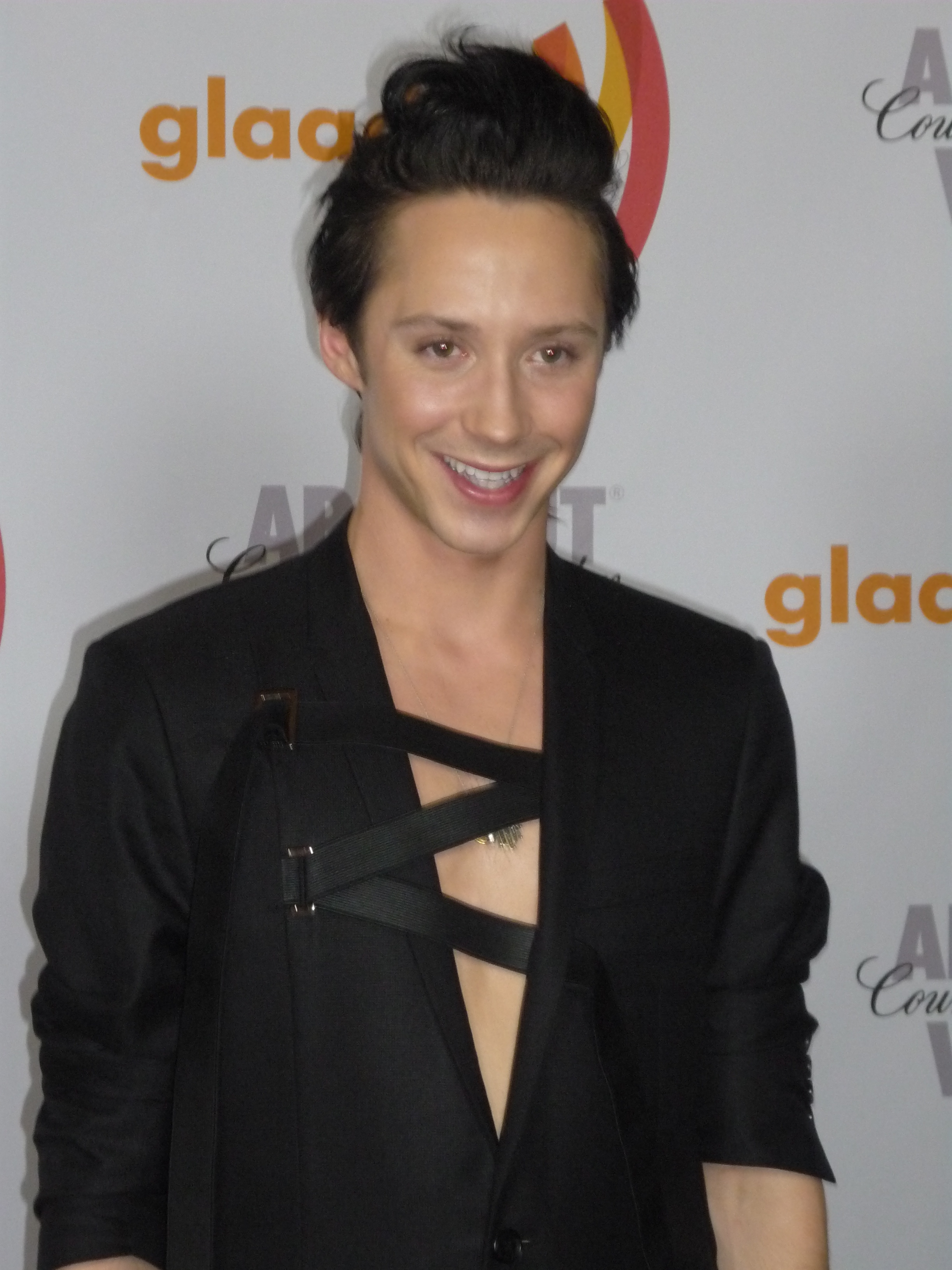
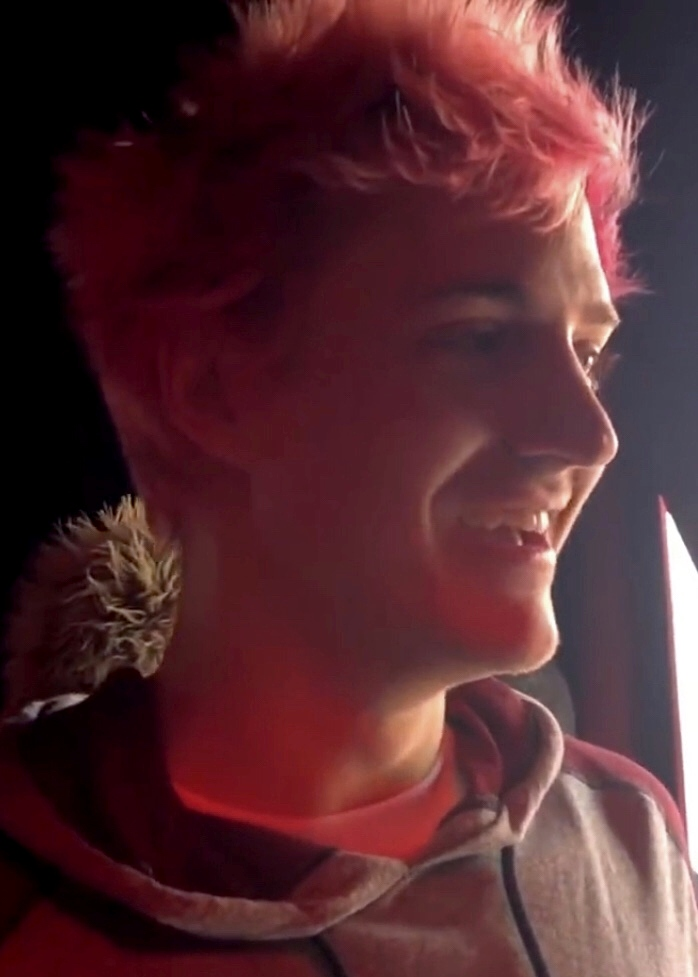
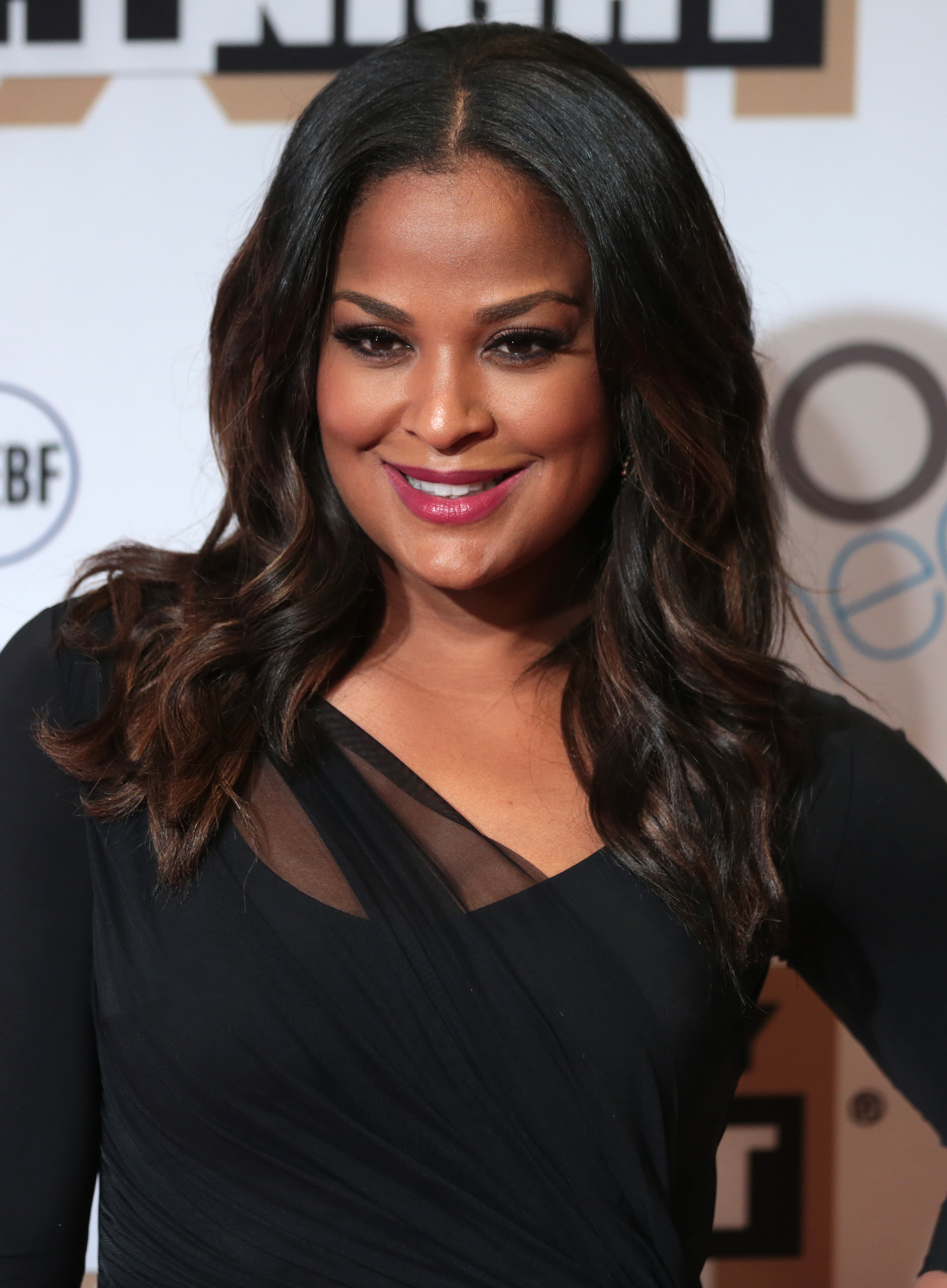
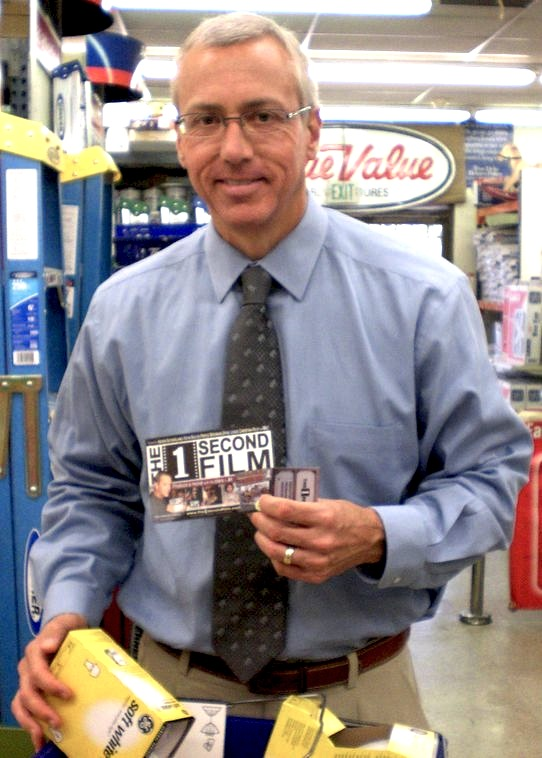
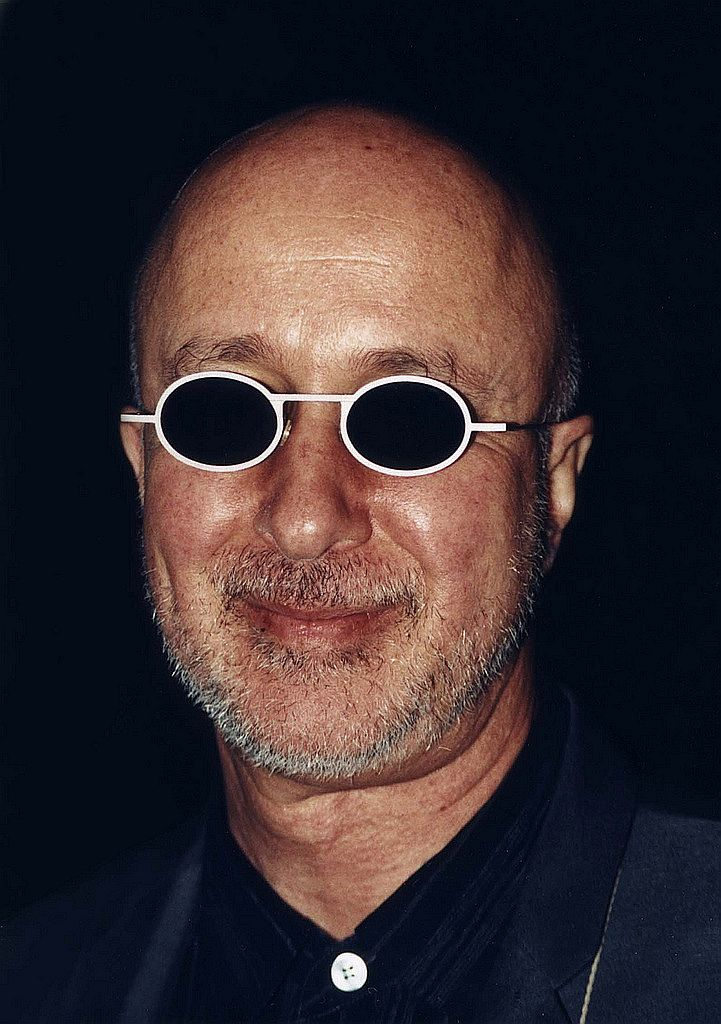
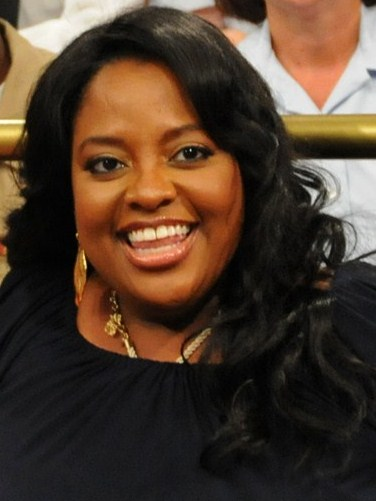
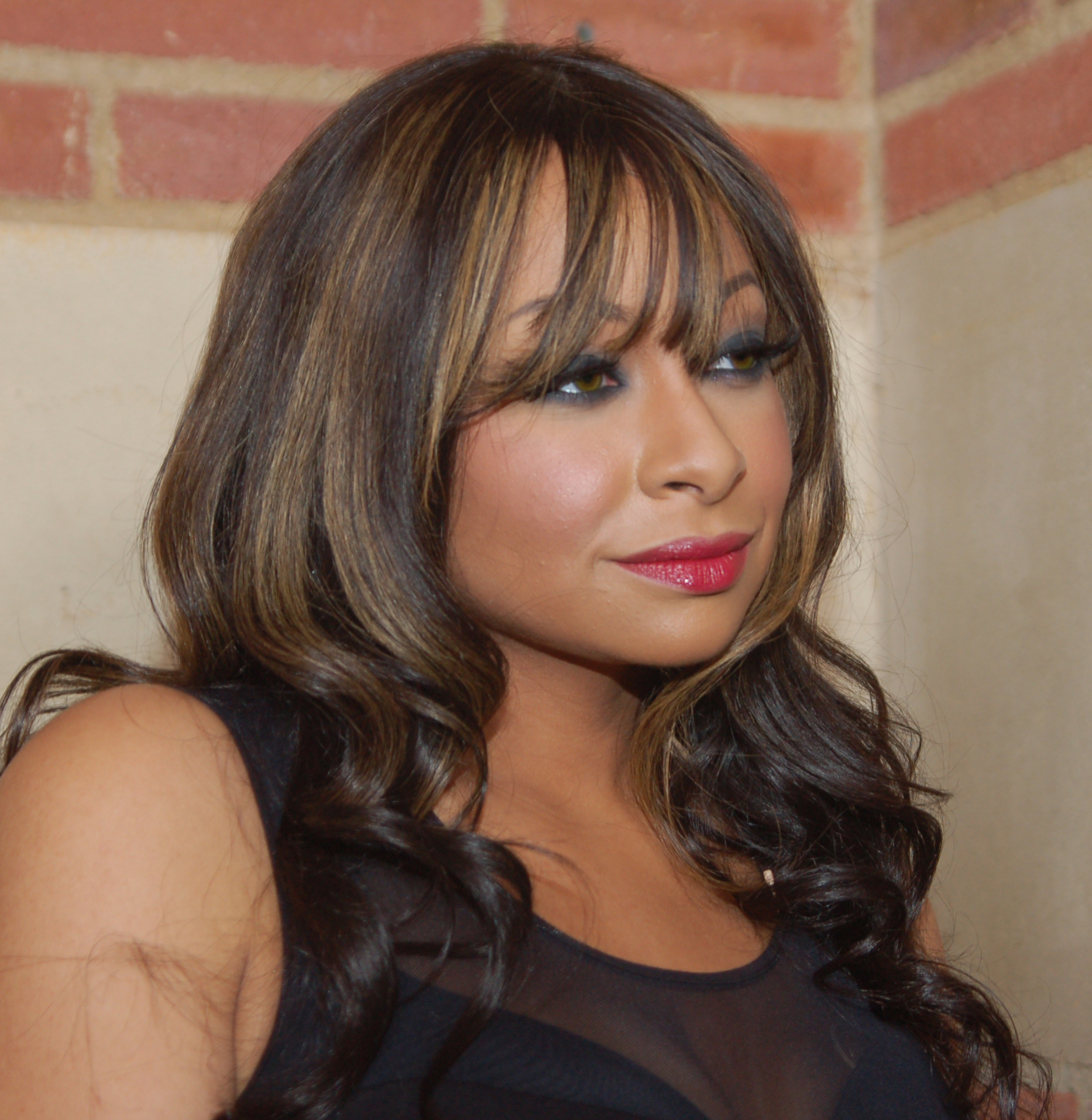
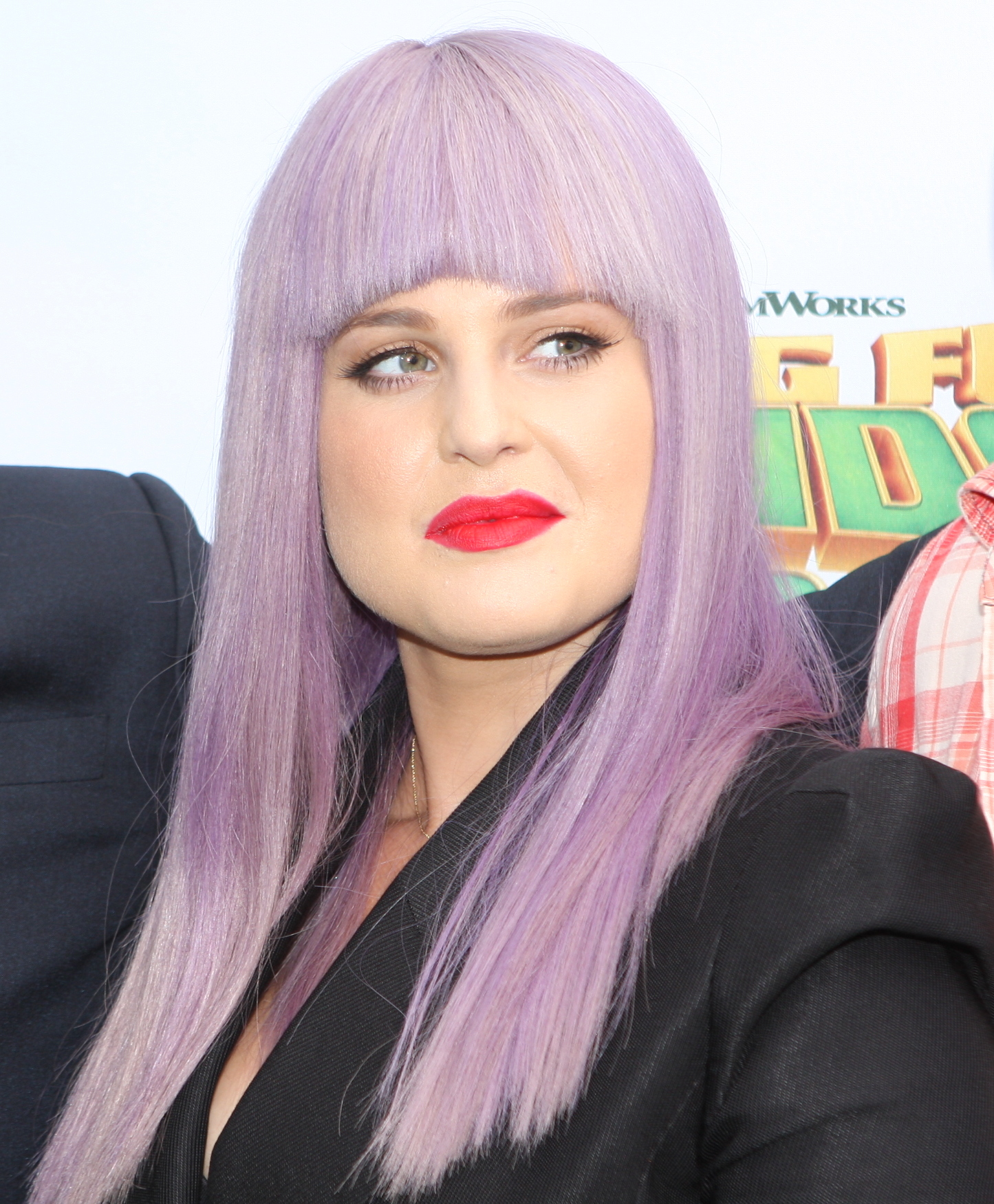
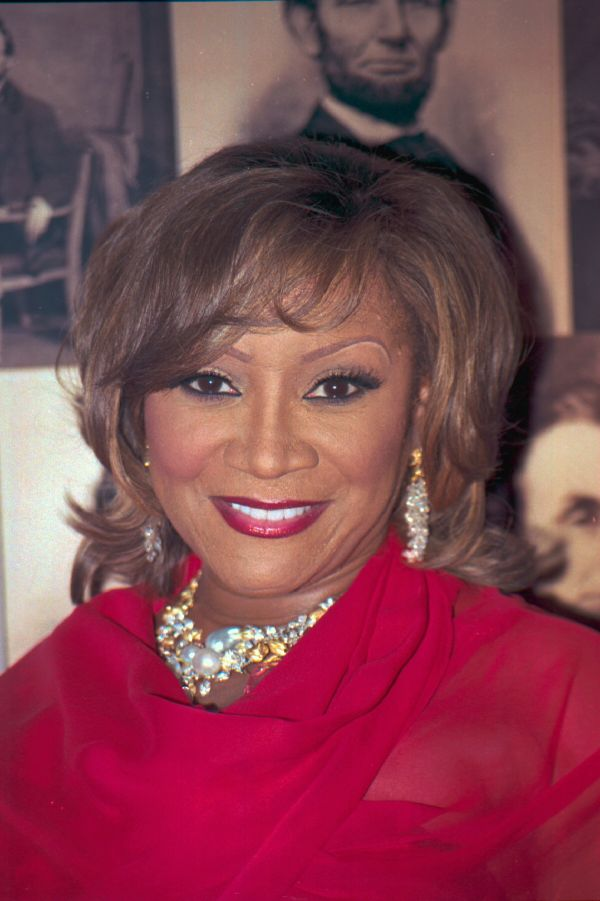
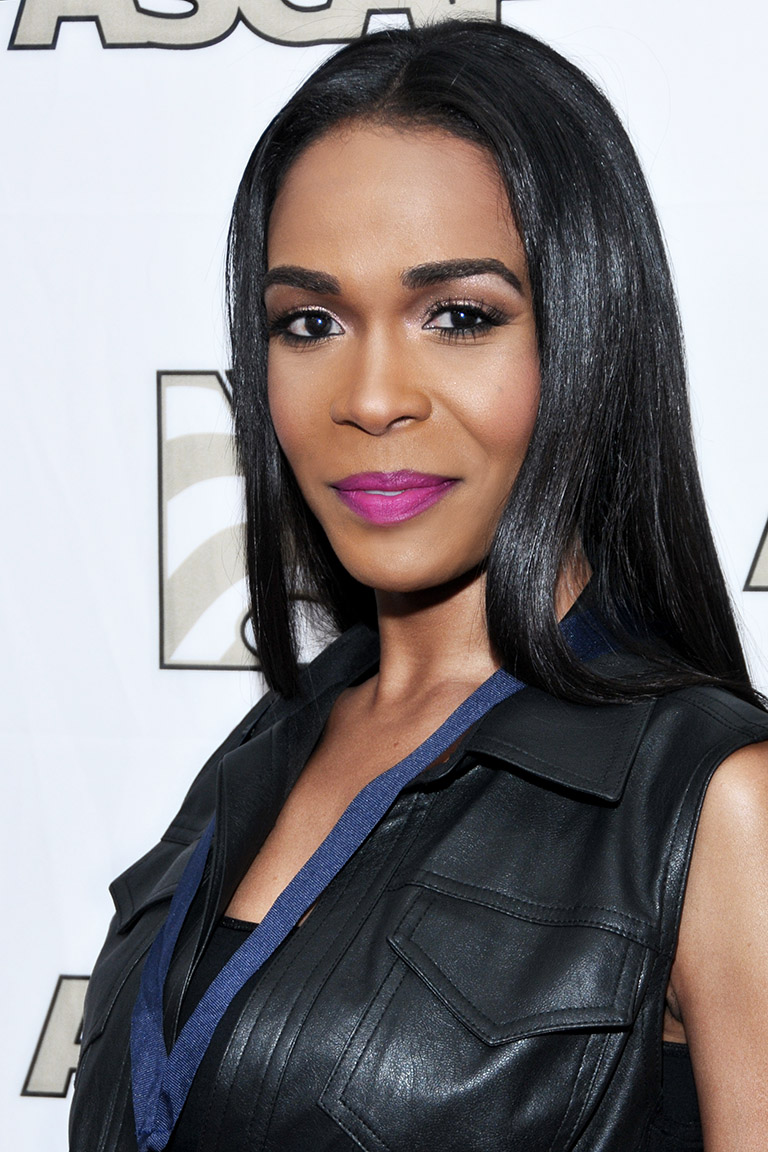
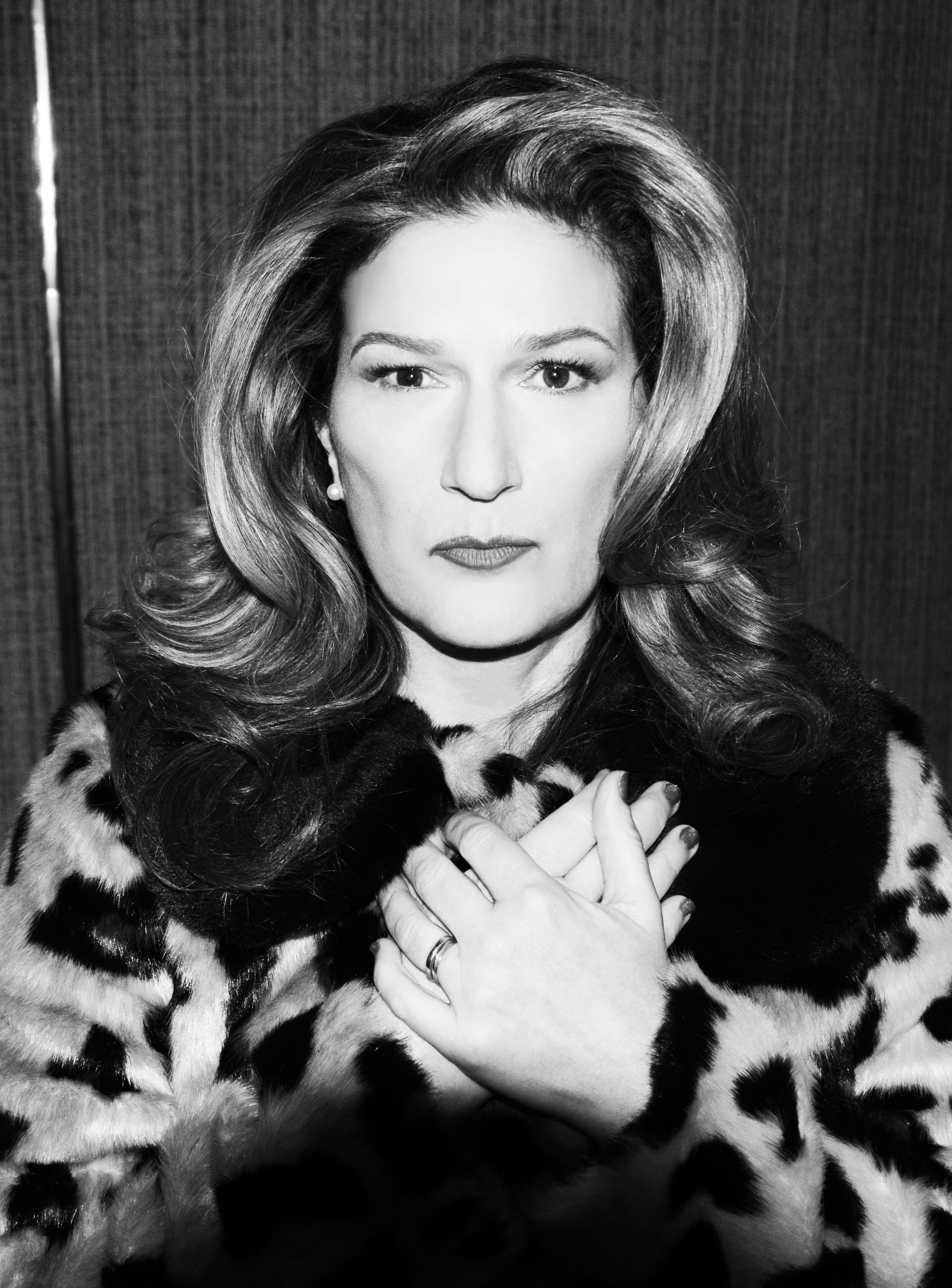
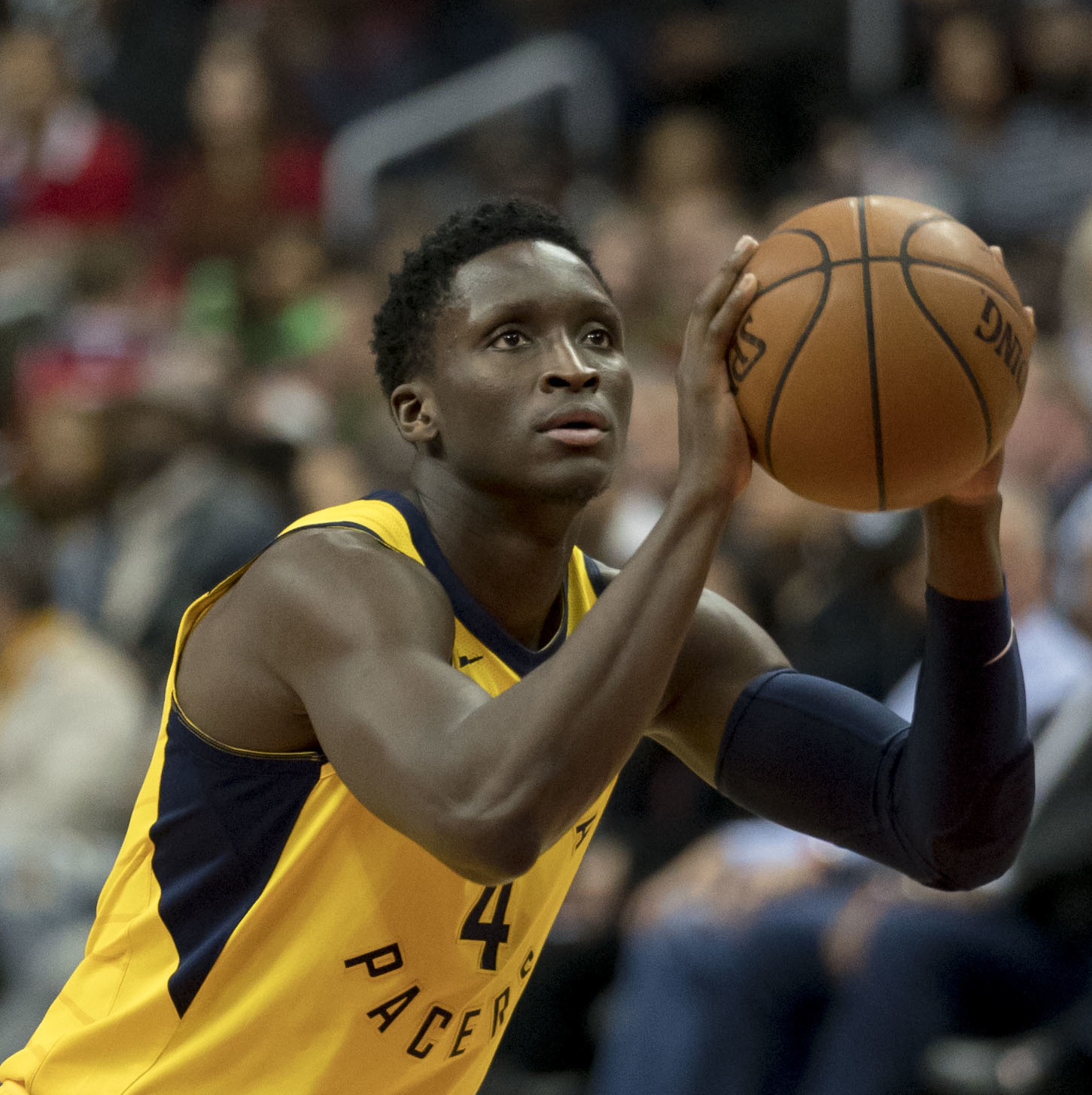
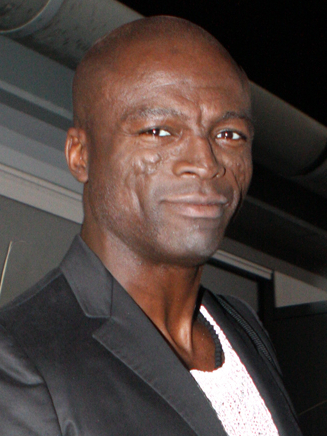
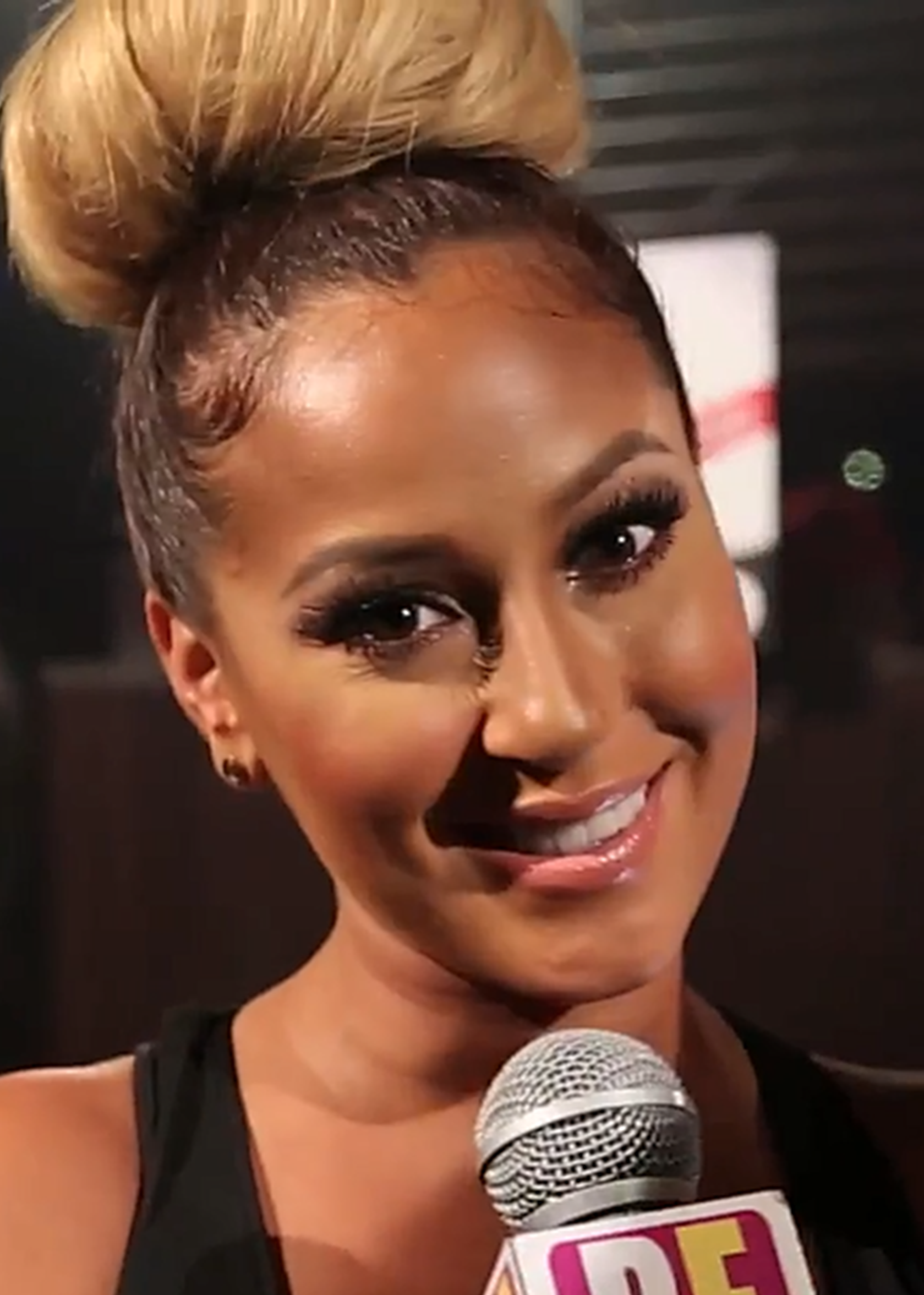
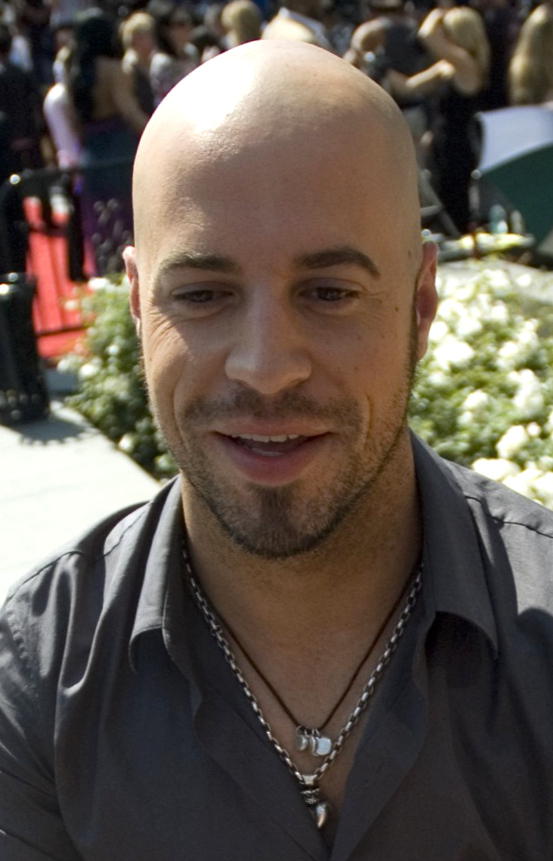
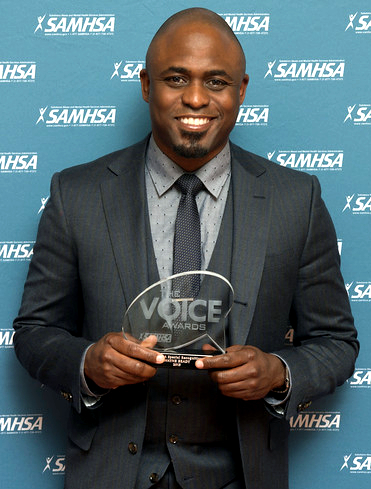
The celebrities who competed in the second season of The Masked Singer, pictured in order of elimination (L–R):
Johnny Weir ("Egg"), Tyler "Ninja" Blevins ("Ice Cream"), Laila Ali ("Panda"), Drew Pinsky ("Eagle"), Paul Shaffer ("Skeleton"), Sherri Shepherd ("Penguin"), Raven-Symoné ("Black Widow"), Kelly Osbourne ("Ladybug"), Patti LaBelle ("Flower"), Michelle Williams ("Butterfly"), Ana Gasteyer ("Tree"), Victor Oladipo ("Thingamajig"), Seal ("Leopard"), Adrienne Bailon-Houghton ("Flamingo"), Chris Daughtry ("Rottweiler"), and Wayne Brady ("Fox")

== Episodes ==
=== Week 1 (September 25) ===
Performances on the first episode (Group A)
#	Stage name	Song	Result	
1	Butterfly	"Bang Bang" by Jessie J, Ariana Grande and Nicki Minaj	WIN	
2	Egg	"Just Dance" by Lady Gaga	RISK	
3	Thingamajig	"Easy" by Commodores	WIN	
4	Skeleton	"Rapper's Delight" by The Sugarhill Gang/"Good Times" by Chic	RISK	
Smackdown			Identity	Result
1	Egg	"One Way or Another" by Blondie	Johnny Weir	OUT
2	Skeleton	"Hard to Handle" by Otis Redding	undisclosed	SAFE

Performances on the first episode (Group B)
#	Stage name	Song	Result	
1	Ladybug	"Holding Out for a Hero" by Bonnie Tyler	RISK	
2	Rottweiler	"Maneater" by Hall & Oates	WIN	
3	Tree	"High Hopes" by Panic! at the Disco	WIN	
4	Ice Cream	"Old Town Road" by Lil Nas X and Billy Ray Cyrus	RISK	
Smackdown			Identity	Result
1	Ice Cream	"Whip It" by Devo	Tyler "Ninja" Blevins	OUT
2	Ladybug	"Hit Me with Your Best Shot" by Pat Benatar	undisclosed	SAFE

=== Week 2 (October 2) ===
Performances on the second episode (Group C)
#	Stage name	Song	Result	
1	Black Widow	"I Wanna Dance with Somebody" by Whitney Houston	WIN	
2	Leopard	"Somebody to Love" by Queen	RISK	
3	Flamingo	"Sucker" by Jonas Brothers	WIN	
4	Panda	"Stronger (What Doesn't Kill You)" by Kelly Clarkson	RISK	
Smackdown			Identity	Result
1	Panda	"All I Do Is Win" by DJ Khaled	Laila Ali	OUT
2	Leopard	"Respect" by Aretha Franklin	undisclosed	SAFE

=== Week 3 (October 9) ===
Performances on the third episode (Group D)
#	Stage name	Song	Result	
1	Flower	"9 to 5" by Dolly Parton	WIN	
2	Eagle	"I'd Do Anything for Love (But I Won't Do That)" by Meat Loaf	RISK	
3	Penguin	"The Middle" by Zedd, Maren Morris and Grey	RISK	
4	Fox	"This Love" by Maroon 5	WIN	
Smackdown			Identity	Result
1	Eagle	"These Boots Are Made for Walkin'" by Nancy Sinatra	Dr. Drew Pinsky	OUT
2	Penguin	"Worth It" by Fifth Harmony	undisclosed	SAFE

=== Week 4 (October 16) ===
Performances on the fourth episode
#	Stage name	Song	Identity	Result
1	Flamingo	"Footloose" by Kenny Loggins	undisclosed	SAFE
2	Leopard	"Stitches" by Shawn Mendes	undisclosed	SAFE
3	Black Widow	"Before He Cheats" by Carrie Underwood	undisclosed	SAFE
4	Skeleton	"Are You Gonna Be My Girl" by Jet	Paul Shaffer	OUT
5	Thingamajig	"Rainbow" by Kacey Musgraves	undisclosed	SAFE
6	Butterfly	"Livin' on a Prayer" by Bon Jovi	undisclosed	SAFE

=== Week 5 (November 6) ===
Performances on the fifth episode
#	Stage name	Song	Identity	Result
1	Rottweiler	"Love Runs Out" by OneRepublic	undisclosed	SAFE
2	Ladybug	"Juice" by Lizzo	undisclosed	SAFE
3	Tree	"Think" by Aretha Franklin	undisclosed	SAFE
4	Penguin	"All About That Bass" by Meghan Trainor	Sherri Shepherd	OUT
5	Flower	"Cheap Thrills" by Sia	undisclosed	SAFE
6	Fox	"Hey Look Ma, I Made It" by Panic! at the Disco	undisclosed	SAFE

Performances on the sixth episode
#	Stage name	Song	Identity	Result
1	Black Widow	"Believe" by Cher	Raven-Symoné	OUT
2	Thingamajig	"Ain't Too Proud to Beg" by The Temptations	undisclosed	SAFE
3	Butterfly	"Don't Know Why" by Norah Jones	undisclosed	SAFE
4	Leopard	"Teenage Dream" by Katy Perry	undisclosed	SAFE
5	Flamingo	"Never Enough" by Loren Allred	undisclosed	SAFE

=== Week 6 (November 13) ===
Performances on the seventh episode
#	Stage name	Song	Identity	Result
1	Fox	"Every Little Step" by Bobby Brown	undisclosed	SAFE
2	Ladybug	"Youngblood" by 5 Seconds of Summer	Kelly Osbourne	OUT
3	Flower	"Amazed" by Lonestar	undisclosed	SAFE
4	Tree	"No Excuses" by Meghan Trainor	undisclosed	SAFE
5	Rottweiler	"Castle on the Hill" by Ed Sheeran	undisclosed	SAFE

=== Week 7 (November 20) ===
Performances on the eighth episode
#	Stage name	Song	Result	
1	Flamingo	"Lady Marmalade" by Patti LaBelle	WIN	
2	Leopard	"September" by Earth, Wind & Fire	RISK	
3	Flower	"Alone" by Heart	RISK	
4	Rottweiler	"Grenade" by Bruno Mars	WIN	
Smackdown			Identity	Result
1	Leopard	"Don't Cha" by The Pussycat Dolls feat. Busta Rhymes	undisclosed	SAFE
2	Flower	"Eye of the Tiger" by Survivor	Patti LaBelle	OUT

=== Week 8 (December 4) ===
Performances on the ninth episode
#	Stage name	Song	Result	
1	Butterfly	"Sorry Not Sorry" by Demi Lovato	RISK	
2	Fox	"Tennessee Whiskey" by Chris Stapleton	WIN	
3	Thingamajig	"Haven't Met You Yet" by Michael Bublé	RISK	
4	Tree	"Total Eclipse of the Heart" by Bonnie Tyler	WIN	
Smackdown			Identity	Result
1	Butterfly	"Believer" by Imagine Dragons	Michelle Williams	OUT
2	Thingamajig	"Caught Up" by Usher	undisclosed	SAFE

=== Week 9 (December 10 and 11) ===
Performances on the tenth episode
#	Stage name	Song	Identity	Result
1	Fox	"Blame It" by Jamie Foxx feat. T-Pain	undisclosed	SAFE
2	Leopard	"We Are Young" by Fun.	undisclosed	SAFE
3	Thingamajig	"Ordinary People" by John Legend	undisclosed	SAFE
4	Flamingo	"Go Your Own Way" by Fleetwood Mac	undisclosed	SAFE
5	Tree	"The Edge of Glory" by Lady Gaga	Ana Gasteyer	OUT
6	Rottweiler	"Someone You Loved" by Lewis Capaldi	undisclosed	SAFE

Performances on the eleventh episode
#	Stage name	Song	Identity	Result
1	Fox	"This Christmas" by Donny Hathaway	undisclosed	SAFE
2	Rottweiler	"Mr. Brightside" by The Killers	undisclosed	SAFE
3	Thingamajig	"Winter Wonderland" by Bing Crosby	Victor Oladipo	OUT
4	Flamingo	"Hallelujah" by Jeff Buckley	undisclosed	SAFE
5	Leopard	"Big Spender" by Shirley Bassey	Seal	OUT

=== Week 10 (December 18) – Finale ===
Performances on the final episode
#	Stage name	Song	Identity	Result
1	Fox	"Try a Little Tenderness" by Otis Redding	Wayne Brady	WINNER
2	Flamingo	"Proud Mary" by Tina Turner	Adrienne Bailon-Houghton	THIRD PLACE
3	Rottweiler	"Alive" by Sia	Chris Daughtry	RUNNER-UP

== Ratings ==
The premiere received a lower 18–49 rating than the first season's but was similar to its average. The ratings for the finale also dropped, though the broadcast was up almost 20 percent in viewers from the previous week's episode. Deadline Hollywood cited the second season as a major reason why Fox—for the first time in the network's history—ranked number one in fall entertainment programming, and Adweek named the show the "Hottest Reality/Competition Series" of 2019.

Viewership and ratings per episode of The Masked Singer (American TV series) season 2
No.	Title	Air date	Timeslot (ET)	Rating/share (18–49)	Viewers (millions)	DVR (18–49)	DVR viewers (millions)	Total (18–49)	Total viewers (millions)
0	"Super Sneak Peek"	September 15, 2019	Sunday 8:00 p.m.	1.4/6	4.52	0.1	0.54	1.5	5.07
1	"Return of the Masks: Groups A & B"	September 25, 2019	Wednesday 8:00 p.m.	2.5/12	8.02	1.1	3.34	3.6	11.37
2	"Return of the Masks: Group C"	October 2, 2019	Wednesday 8:00 p.m.	2.0/10	6.97	1.0	2.97	3.0	9.95
3	"Return of the Masks: Group D"	October 9, 2019	Wednesday 8:00 p.m.	2.0/10	7.11	1.0	2.95	3.1	10.07
4	"Once Upon a Mask"	October 16, 2019	Wednesday 8:00 p.m.	2.2/11	7.41	1.0	2.80	3.1	10.22
5–6	"Mask Us Anything / Mask-ish"	November 6, 2019	Wednesday 8:00 p.m.	2.0/10	7.10	1.0	2.99	3.0	10.11
7	"Triumph Over Masks"	November 13, 2019	Wednesday 8:00 p.m.	1.6/8	5.58	1.0	2.78	2.6	8.37
8	"Mask and You Shall Receive"	November 20, 2019	Wednesday 8:00 p.m.	1.9/9	6.69	0.8	2.51	2.7	9.21
9	"Clash of the Masks"	December 4, 2019	Wednesday 8:00 p.m.	1.8/9	6.59	0.8	2.40	2.6	8.99
10	"A Pain in the Mask"	December 10, 2019	Tuesday 8:00 p.m.	1.6/8	5.78	0.8	2.21	2.4	7.99
11	"Two Masks Take It Off: Holiday Semi-Finals"	December 11, 2019	Wednesday 8:00 p.m.	1.9/10	6.90	0.8	2.43	2.7	9.33
12	"Road to the Finals"	December 18, 2019	Wednesday 8:00 p.m.	1.6/9	6.20	0.7	2.27	2.4	8.47
13	"Season Finale: And The Winner Takes It All and Takes It Off"	December 18, 2019	Wednesday 9:00 p.m.	2.2/11	8.36	0.9	2.74	3.1	11.11
