= I'm in Love with a Church Girl =

2013 U.S. Christian drama film

- Film poster
- Directed by: Steve Race
- Screenplay by: Galley Molina
- Produced by: Galley Molina; Steve Race; Michael K. Race; Sean Dinwoodie; Israel Houghton
- Starring: Jeff "Ja Rule" Atkins; Adrienne Bailon; Stephen Baldwin; T-Bone; TobyMac; Vincent Pastore; Michael Madsen; Martin Kove
- Cinematography: Keith J. Duggan
- Edited by: Taichi Erskine
- Music by: Bruce Fowler
- Production company: Reverence Gospel Media
- Distributed by: High Top Releasing
- Release date: October 18, 2013
- Country: United States
- Language: English
- Budget: $3 million
- Box office: $2.5 million

I'm in Love with a Church Girl is a 2013 American Christian drama film directed by Steve Race. It stars Jeff "Ja Rule" Atkins, Adrienne Bailon, Stephen Baldwin, Vincent Pastore, Toby Mac, T-Bone, Michael Madsen and Martin Kove. The film was released in theaters on October 18, 2013. Reviews from mainstream media were negative while the response from Christian media was more positive.

== Plot ==
Wealthy drug dealer Miles Montego meets a nice Christian girl, Vanessa Leon, at a mutual friend's house, and the two hit it off and start a relationship. Miles tells Vanessa that he used to be a drug dealer, but now wants to change his life. At first she is reluctant, but accepts it, assuming that he will start having faith in God. However, unknown to Miles, a few DEA agents are watching him and his friends and plan on taking them down.

Miles' mother dies from an illness, and he proposes to Vanessa on an airplane. After a car accident, Vanessa enters a coma. As he waits in the hospital, Miles starts to restore his faith in God, praying to him to make Vanessa wake up and saying that she shouldn't have to pay for his sins. Vanessa recovers and the two marry. He writes to his friends, who are now in jail, and tells them that he misses them. He also sends them Bibles and tells them that they better stay out of trouble since they're going to be uncles.

The film ends with a look at three years later, showing Vanessa, her family, Miles' dad and their daughter in church, where Miles is now the pastor.

== Cast ==
- Jeff "Ja Rule" Atkins as Miles Montego
- Adrienne Bailon as Vanessa Leon
- Stephen Baldwin as Jason McDaniels
- Vincent Pastore as Nicholas Halston
- Toby Mac as "T"
- T-Bone as Martin De LaFuente
- Michael Madsen as Frank Harris
- Martin Kove as Terry Edgemond

== Production ==
The film, which was written by Galley Molina is based on his own experience. Molina wrote it during his time in prison. He initially wanted to tell his story in a book but it was eventually developed into a film. He chose Bailon and Baldwin for the film because of their "strong Christian backgrounds and for their talents". Molina sought financing on his own for the project so that he could retain more creative control. He refused an offer of a major studio because they wanted to glamorize his drug-dealing days. Singer Israel Houghton, who Co-Executive produced the film, contributed four original songs to the soundtrack.

The film was produced by Sean Dinwoodie, Galley Molina, Michael K. Race, & Steve Race.

The film was shot in San Jose, California and was completed in November 2010.

== Release ==
The trailer for the film was released on July 15, 2013. The film opened on October 18, 2013.

=== Critical reception ===
The film has been panned by critics; it holds a 10% approval rating on aggregate review site Rotten Tomatoes with an average score of 3.10/10, based on 21 reviews. On Metacritic, which assigns a weighted mean rating out of 100 to reviews from mainstream critics, the film received an average score of 23, based on 13 reviews, indicating "generally unfavorable" reviews. In 2013, Matt Barone of complex.com, shared his thoughts on the film in article titled "The Most Unintentionally Hilarious Movie Scene of 2013 Stars Ja Rule (Yes, That Ja Rule)", referring to a scene near the end of the film in which an angry Miles enters a church and delivers a vitriolic monologue.

=== Christian response ===
The film had a slightly more positive reception among Christian publications. Christianity Today gave the film 2 out of 4 stars, saying: "Church Girl tries to pack too many messages (about conversion, about faith, about drugs, about romance, about tragedy, about church, and more) into a movie that just isn't wide enough to hold it all." The magazine gave positive marks to Ja Rule's acting, calling it "good" and "believable". Movieguide praised the production and the performances, which they described as "convincing, despite the mediocre script". It concluded stating the film "has a heartfelt Christian message that many will enjoy". The Dove Foundation summarized the film as "the story of a man that falls in love with a woman and one of a man realizing that God loves him. This movie is timely, contemporary, yet shares a wonderful old message: God can change people’s lives! It features fine actors and a terrific theme centering on God's forgiveness and love as well as the love between a man and a woman." Ryan Duncan of Crosswalk.com wrote: "Though the movie still suffers from a few trademark flaws that mar faith-based films, it succeeds in telling a story that will resonate with Christian and secular audiences alike." Duncan further applauded the actors' performances describing them as "powerful" and highlighting the chemistry between the two main characters. However, Duncan also noted that the story at times can be tedious and boring. "As for the Christian message, viewers will be happy to know it is delivered with authenticity and respect."

=== Box office ===
In its first weekend, the film opened in 457 locations in North America. It finished the weekend at fifteenth place and earned $1,025,000, with a per screen average of $2,243. The film performed above expectations, as it was forecast that "it would be surprising if this averaged above $1,000 per theater."

=== Home media ===
Cinedigm Entertainment released the film to Google Play Store, iTunes Store, DVD and Blu-ray on January 14, 2014.
