= Julissa Bermudez =

American actress

Julissa Bermúdez
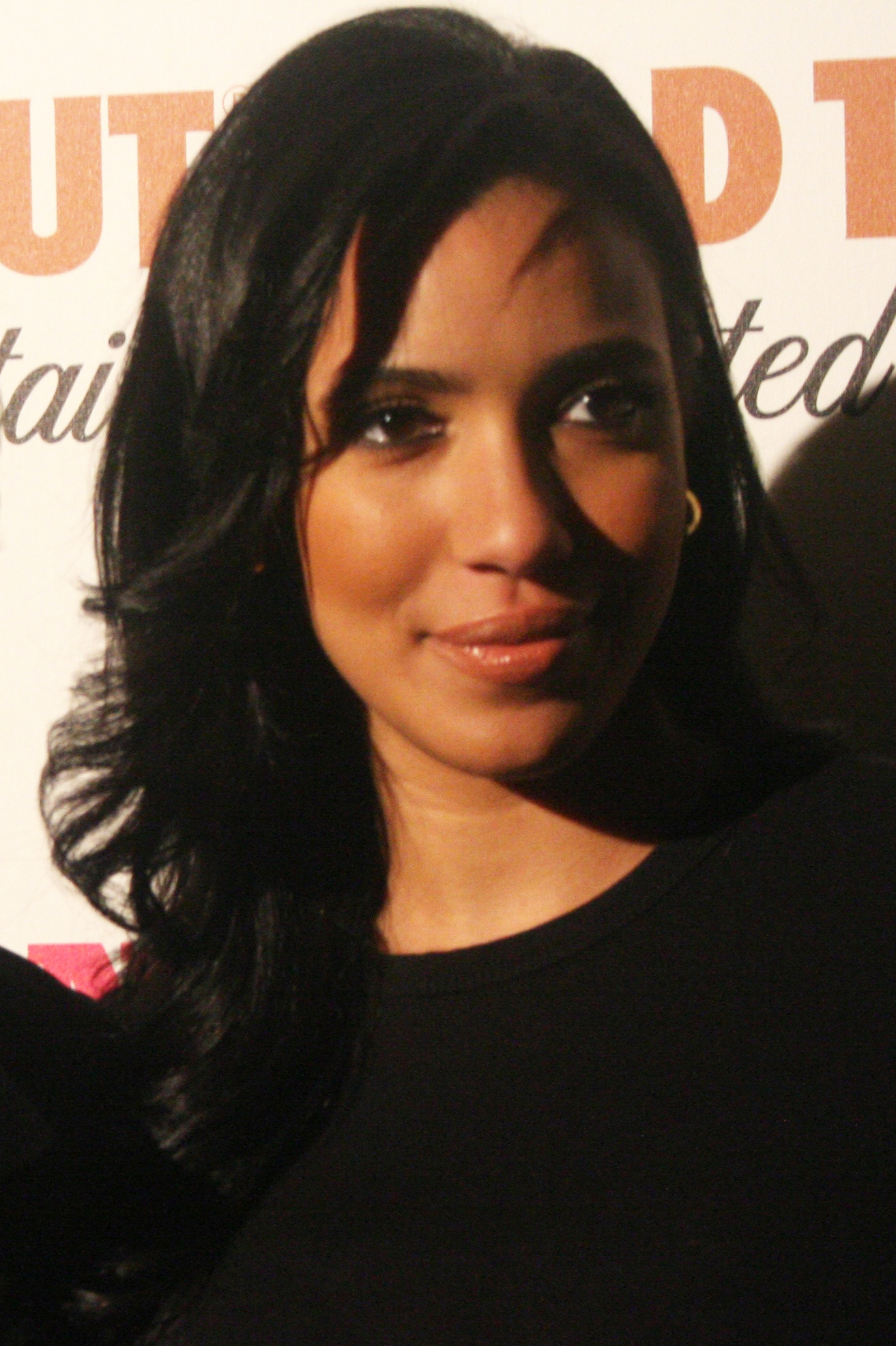
- Bermúdez in 2011
- Born: Santo Domingo, Dominican Republic
- Occupations: Actress; television personality
- Years active: 2003–present

Julissa Bermúdez is an American actress and television personality. Along Big Tigger, she was a co-host on BET's most popular music video countdown show 106 & Park from 2005 until 2006 (came back in December 2014 during its end), and the former host of MTV's Jersey Shore: After Hours and related Jersey Shore specials and reunions for earlier seasons. She co-starred alongside recording artist and actress Adrienne Bailon in their own reality series, Empire Girls: Julissa and Adrienne, which aired on the former Style Network.

== Early life ==
Bermudez was born in Santo Domingo, Dominican Republic and raised in Elmhurst, Queens, New York.

== Career ==
Bermúdez co-hosted the entertainment news show "Central Ave" from 2020 until 2021.

== Filmography ==
Film
Year	Film	Role	Notes
2006	The Wannabe	David's Fantasy Girl	
2006	All You've Got	Cousin Mali	
2008	Make It Happen	Carmen	
2010	Harlem Hostel	Julie	
2018	Danger One	Montez	
Television
Year	Title	Role	Notes
2003	The Roof	Herself	Hostess
2005–2007, 2014	106 & Park	Herself	Hostess
2006–2007	Julissa's Corner	Herself	Hostess
2009	Royal Pains	Maxine	1 episode
2009	Z Rock	Lola	1 episode
2009–2011	Jersey Shore	Herself	6 episodes: "After Hours" / "Reunion" / "Before the Shore"
2010	Rescue Me	Hot Bartender	1 episode
2010	Tyler Perry's Meet the Browns	Girl that likes Will	1 episode
2012	Empire Girls: Julissa & Adrienne	Herself	Lead role
2020	Hunters	Maria de la Ruiz	Recurring role, 8 episodes
2023	The Plus One	Ana Sanchez	1 episode

== See also ==
- List of Afro-Latinos
- Lists of people from the Dominican Republic
