= La Colonia de Eden Gardens =

Neighbourhood in San Diego County, California

Coordinates: 32.985°N 117.258°W

La Colonia de Eden Gardens, also known as La Colonia and Eden Gardens, is a neighborhood in Solana Beach in northern San Diego County, California.

== History ==
La Colonia de Eden Gardens is one of the oldest residential areas of Solana Beach, founded in the 1920s by Mexican farmers who were hired by the owners of large ranches in adjacent Rancho Santa Fe. The farmers wanted their families living nearby, hence the name La Colonia (the colony). The original homes built by the first settlers were single-level adobe buildings. They were later demolished and replaced by two-story apartment complexes. This brought more residents and expanded the density of the neighborhood.

The name Eden Gardens was thought up in the 1970s by eager land developers, looking to attract residents to the area. But it's thought to originated as early as the 1950s.

In the late 1980s, drug and alcohol problems in the area had reached troublesome levels. Undocumented immigrants were exploited by the drug dealers who got them to sell drugs on the street, since they made for reluctant witnesses, were they to be questioned by police. At the two ends of the main drag through La Colonia sentries would be posted, who would send warnings should the police show up.

Local residents spoke up about these issues to the City Council, with the council responding by voting in new ordinances, banning the public consumption of alcohol and increasing the police presence. In 1988 Eddie Lewis created the "Eden Gardens Against Drugs" organization in an effort to improve the area's troubled reputation. In 1991, a new community center was built in La Colonia park and the children's playground was renovated. In 1996, the San Diego County Sheriff's Department opened an office in the La Colonia Park Community Center. Through these efforts, crime in the area began to diminish substantially.

== Community outreach ==
In 2010, Manny Aguilar, Mary Ann Aguilar, Victor Tostado, Maria Dybbro, Tracy Weiss, Diane Hardison, Pat Caughey and other concerned community members founded La Colonia de Eden Gardens Foundation to help reduce increasing drug and gang violence, and to support local youth by helping them to make positive choices and to provide greater resources for residents.

In 2014, the La Colonia de Eden Gardens Foundation, the National Latino Research Center and Cal State San Marcos met with 70 community members, having them complete a 94-question survey. The results of the survey were analyzed to document community needs and concerns, the cultural and social identity of the community and to find ways to improve the community.

== La Colonia Park ==
In 1974, a report by the San Diego Human Relations Commission criticized the county for neglecting the recreational needs of La Colonia de Eden Gardens, and the result was the creation of La Colonia Park in the late 1970s.

The oldest building in Solana Beach, the "Stevens House" is located within the park. Once a private property, it now houses the Solana Heritage Museum.

== Local businesses ==
Popular in La Colonia are three Mexican restaurants. Don Chuy's restaurant was originally called La Tiendita and was opened in 1932 by the Granados family. It was run by members of the Granados family until 2014 when it went out of business. Tony's Jacal Restaurant was opened in 1946 by the Gonzalez family. Currently, three generations of the Gonzalez family work in the restaurant. Fidel's Little Mexico Restaurant started by Fidel Montanez selling tacos in his barber shop in the 1960s. The tacos were a hit and the barber shop replaced and transformed into a large and successful restaurant.

Also found in La Colonia de Eden Gardens is Baker Iron Works. The owner Charlie Baker runs the establishment and creates an assortment of ornamental wrought iron works for customers.

== Notable people ==
- Lil Rob, rapper
