= Neighborhood Music =

Studio album by Lil Rob
- Released: February 17, 2004
- Recorded: 2003–2004
- Studio: Digital Services (Houston, Texas)
- Genre: Chicano rap; gangsta rap
- Length: 47:06
- Label: Upstairs Records
- Producer: John Lopez (exec.); Fingazz

Lil Rob chronology
| The Album (2002) | Neighborhood Music (2004) | Twelve Eighteen Part I (2005) |

Singles from Neighborhood Music
- 1. "Neighborhood Music" Released: 2004

Neighborhood Music is the fifth studio album by Mexican-American Chicano rap recording artist Lil Rob from San Diego, California. It was released on February 17, 2004, via Upstairs Records.

== Track listing ==
| No. | Title | Length |
|---|---|---|
| 1. | "Intro" | 0:49 |
| 2. | "I'm Still Ridin' Like That" | 3:24 |
| 3. | "Neighborhood Music" | 4:12 |
| 4. | "Can We Ride?" (featuring David Wade) | 3:36 |
| 5. | "Back Up" | 3:26 |
| 6. | "Bluffin'" | 4:12 |
| 7. | "Just One of Your Kisses" | 4:12 |
| 8. | "I Know How It Feels" | 3:46 |
| 9. | "It's My Life" (featuring David Wade & Moox) | 4:13 |
| 10. | "What Can I Do?" | 3:46 |
| 11. | "We Don't Play" | 3:20 |
| 12. | "1218" | 3:51 |
| 13. | "Boo-Hoo-Hoo" (Mr. Shadow & Royal T diss) | 3:49 |
| Total length: | | 47:06 |

== Charts ==
| Chart (2004) | Peak position |
|---|---|
| US Top R&B/Hip-Hop Albums (Billboard) | 94 |
| US Independent Albums (Billboard) | 10 |
