= Love & Hate (Lil Rob album) =

Studio album by Lil Rob
- Released: September 29, 2009
- Recorded: 2009
- Genre: Chicano rap
- Label: Upstairs Records
- Producer: John Lopez (exec.); Moox; Steve Vicious

Lil Rob chronology
1218 (Part II) (2008)	Love & Hate (2009)	R.I.P. (Recording In Progress) (2014)

Professional ratings
Review scores
Source	Rating
AllMusic	3.5/5 stars

Love & Hate is the eighth studio album by Mexican-American Chicano rap recording artist Lil Rob from San Diego, California. It was released on September 29, 2009 through Upstairs Records with distribution via Fontana Distribution. The album peaked at number 158 on the Billboard 200 albums chart in the United States.

== Track listing ==
All lyrics are written by Roberto L. Flores.

No.	Title	Producer(s)	Length
1.	"In My Blood"	Steve Vicious	4:02
2.	"You Don't Understand"	Moox	3:45
3.	"Get a Grip"	Moox	3:41
4.	"Make You Say"	Moox	3:36
5.	"Dream"	Moox	3:52
6.	"Together"	Moox	3:31
7.	"The Jam"	Moox	3:00
8.	"Jealous" (Lil G Diss)	Moox	3:13
9.	"Lay You Down"	Moox	3:06
10.	"Where You From?"	Moox	4:01
11.	"Can't Believe"	Moox	3:40
12.	"What Goes Around Comes Around"	Steve Vicious	4:21
13.	"Off My Mind"	Moox	3:21
14.	"Smile"	Moox	3:17

== Chart history ==
Chart (2009)	Peak position
US Billboard 200	158
US Top R&B/Hip-Hop Albums (Billboard)	49
US Top Rap Albums (Billboard)	21
US Independent Albums (Billboard)	26
