= Bring Out the Freak in You =

Single by Lil Rob

from the album Twelve Eighteen, Pt. 1
- A-side: "Back in the Streets"
- Released: 2006
- Recorded: 2005
- Genre: Dirty rap
- Length: 3:47
- Label: Upstairs Records
- Songwriter(s): Robert Flores; Shonn Bonnett
- Producer(s): Moox

Lil Rob singles chronology
"Summer Nights" (2005)	"Bring Out the Freak in You" (2006)	"Stuck With You / Do It" (2007)

Music video
- "Bring Out The Freak In You" on YouTube

"Bring Out the Freak in You" is a song by hip hop recording artist Lil Rob from his sixth studio album Twelve Eighteen, Pt. 1. It was released in 2006 via Upstairs Records as the second single from the album. Production was handled by Moox.

== Charts ==
Chart (2006)	Peak position
US Billboard Hot 100	85
US Hot Rap Songs (Billboard)	20
