= The Album (Lil Rob album) =

Studio album by Lil Rob
- Released: September 3, 2002
- Recorded: 2002
- Genre: Chicano rap; gangsta rap
- Length: 52:29
- Label: Upstairs Records
- Producer: John Lopez (exec.); VMF; Destiny The Bandit; Wendell Springer; Daniel Castillo

Lil Rob chronology
| Can't Keep a Good Man Down (2001) | The Album (2002) | Neighborhood Music (2004) |

The Album is the fourth studio album by Mexican-American Chicano rap recording artist Lil Rob from San Diego, California. It was released on September 3, 2002 via Upstairs Records.

== Track listing ==
| No. | Title | Length |
|---|---|---|
| 1. | "Intro (They Call Me Lil Rob)" | 0:53 |
| 2. | "Brought Up in a Small Neighborhood" | 4:43 |
| 3. | "City That Everyone Knows Produced by Destiny the Bandit composer Robert Montano" | 3:23 |
| 4. | "Barely Getting By" | 3:53 |
| 5. | "California" | 3:41 |
| 6. | "Linda Mujer" | 4:32 |
| 7. | "I Remember" | 3:50 |
| 8. | "Saw You on the Dance Floor" | 3:44 |
| 9. | "Drinking On My Driveway" | 3:57 |
| 10. | "Hey There Ms. Brown" | 4:31 |
| 11. | "Keep It Real" | 3:40 |
| 12. | "Call the Cops" (Royal T Diss) | 3:30 |
| 13. | "School Days" | 2:37 |
| 14. | "Skit" | 0:09 |
| 15. | "Street Dayz" | 2:46 |
| 16. | "Brought Up in a Small Neighborhood" (West Coast Mix) | 4:32 |
| Total length: | | 52:29 |

== Charts ==
| Chart (2003) | Peak position |
|---|---|
| US Top R&B/Hip-Hop Albums (Billboard) | 94 |
| US Independent Albums (Billboard) | 40 |
