= Celebrity Nightmares Decoded =

Celebrity Nightmares Decoded is a show that aired on FYI (formerly known as The Biography Channel) in the United States. It premiered on Saturday, September 18, 2010, at 10:00 PM EST.

== Description ==
Lauren Lawrence, who has been interpreting the dreams of famous celebrities for over 10 years, is a columnist for the NY Daily News and has written several books including "Private Dreams of Public People" which breaks down the nightmares that have haunted stars.

== Format ==
A celebrity sits down with a dream analyst and discusses their nightmare. After reviewing the key symbols in the dream, the analyst explains its meaning to the celebrity.

The pilot features host and dream analyst Lauren Lawrence, Bronson Pinchot, Jodie Sweetin, Rachel Dratch, and Barry Williams.

The show is produced by Sharp Entertainment and is distributed by AENT to the Biography Channel.
