= Twelve Eighteen, Pt. 1 =

Twelve Eighteen Part I

Studio album by Lil Rob
- Released: July 26, 2005
- Recorded: 2005
- Genre: Chicano rap
- Length: 51:20
- Label: Upstairs Records
- Producers: John Lopez (exec.); Fingazz; Moox

Lil Rob chronology
Neighborhood Music (2004)	Twelve Eighteen Part I (2005)	1218 (Part II) (2008)

Singles from Twelve Eighteen Part I
- 1. "Back in the Streets/Bring Out the Freak in You" Released: 2005; 2. "Summer Nights" Released: June 28, 2005

Professional ratings
Review scores
Source	Rating
AllMusic	3.5/5 stars
RapReviews	7/10 stars

Twelve Eighteen Part I is the sixth studio album by Mexican-American Chicano rap recording artist Lil Rob. It was released on July 26, 2005 via Upstairs Records. Production was handled by Fingazz and Moox with executive producer John Lopez. The album was Lil Rob's most commercial success, reaching number 31 on the Billboard 200 albums chart in the United States. It spawned two singles: "Bring Out the Freak in You" and "Summer Nights", which both charted on the Billboard Hot 100 singles chart at numbers 85 and 36, respectively.

== Track listing ==
No.	Title	Length
1.	"My Turn"	3:46
2.	"Summer Nights"	4:28
3.	"Back in the Streets"	3:14
4.	"Superbad"	4:11
5.	"Playground"	3:52
6.	"What Am I Saying?"	3:44
7.	"Ooh Baby Baby"	3:28
8.	"Bring Out the Freak in You"	3:46
9.	"Rough Neighborhood"	3:46
10.	"No Future in It"	4:12
11.	"Representing"	4:12
12.	"I Who Have Nothing (But I Have Respect)"	3:56
13.	"I'm Still Here" (Bonus Track)	4:05
Total length:		51:20

Sample credits

- "Back in the Streets" contains elements from "I Was Married" by Billy Paul
- "I Who Have Nothing" contains elements from "I Who Have Nothing" by Linda Jones

== Charts ==
Chart (2005)	Peak position
US Billboard 200	31
US Top R&B/Hip-Hop Albums (Billboard)	16
US Top Rap Albums (Billboard)	9
US Independent Albums (Billboard)	3
