= Summer Nights (Lil Rob song) =

Single by Lil Rob

from the album Twelve Eighteen, Pt. 1
- Released: June 28, 2005
- Recorded: 2005
- Genre: Hip hop
- Length: 4:09
- Label: Upstairs Records
- Songwriters: Robert Flores; John Stary
- Producer: Fingazz

Lil Rob singles chronology
"Neighborhood Music" (2004)	"Summer Nights" (2005)	"Bring Out the Freak in You" (2006)

Music video
- "Summer Nights" on YouTube

"Summer Nights" is a song by hip hop recording artist Lil Rob from his sixth studio album Twelve Eighteen, Pt. 1. It was released on June 28, 2005 via Upstairs Records as the lead single from the album. Production was handled by Fingazz. The song peaked at number 36 on the US Billboard Hot 100 singles chart.

== Charts ==
Chart (2005)	Peak position
US Billboard Hot 100	36
US Hot Rap Songs (Billboard)	13
