= 1218 (Pt. II) =

1218 Part II

Studio album by Lil Rob
- Released: October 21, 2008
- Genre: Chicano rap
- Label: Upstairs Records
- Producer: John Lopez (exec.); Fingazz; Bionik; Nasty Beatz; Simez Carter; Moox

Lil Rob chronology
Twelve Eighteen Part I (2005)	1218 Part II (2008)	Love & Hate (2009)

Singles from 1812 Part II
- 1. "Stuck With You/Do It" Released: April 3, 2007

1218 Part II is the seventh studio album by Mexican-American Chicano rap recording artist Lil Rob from San Diego, California. The album was set to be released in 2006, advertisement posters were created stating April 2007, but it ended up being pushed back because songs were being leaked. Lil Rob decided he needed to remake some songs that would differ from leaked tracks. Release date by Upstairs Records advertisements state October 21, 2008. The album leaked onto the Internet on October 18, 2008.

== Track listing ==
No.	Title	Producer(s)	Length
1.	"Bringing It Back"	Fingazz	3:53
2.	"Slow It Down" (featuring Frankie J)	Moox	4:00
3.	"Leanin' on the Weekend"	Bionik	3:25
4.	"Brown Side"	Fingazz	5:27
5.	"Let's Go"	Fingazz	4:16
6.	"Let Me Come Back"	Fingazz	4:11
7.	"Bang Bang Boogie"	Fingazz	3:44
8.	"Fast Life"	Bionik	3:26
9.	"Microphone Rippin'"	Simez Carter; Nasty Beatz	4:05
10.	"Cortez Shoes"	Fingazz	4:06
11.	"Everyday"	Bionik	3:35
12.	"Stuck With You"	Simez Carter; Nasty Beatz	3:36
13.	"Out of My Mind"	Fingazz	4:32
14.	"Do It"	Fingazz	4:00
15.	"Just One of Those Days"	Fingazz	3:28
16.	"Stick Up"	Bionik	3:51
17.	"Fan Mail" (f.y.e. Bonus Track)	Fingazz	3:57

Rejected tracks

- "My Chick"
- "Keep Doing What You're Doing"
- "Bouncin'" (featuring Fingazz)

Sample credits

- "Bang Bang Boogie" sampled "The Safety Dance" by Men Without Hats
- "Fan Mail" sampled "Juicy" by Notorious B.I.G. and "Juicy Fruit" by Mtume
- "Let Me Come Back" sampled "Baby Come Back" by Player
- "Out of My Mind" sampled "I'm Gone" by Shirley and Lee and "What Can I Do?" by Donnie Elbert

== Chart history ==
Chart (2005)	Peak position
US Billboard 200	101
US Top R&B/Hip-Hop Albums (Billboard)	16
US Top Rap Albums (Billboard)	5
US Independent Albums (Billboard)	12
