= Radio Disney Jams series =

Compilation album series

Radio Disney Jams was a series of CD compilations of music that was featured on Radio Disney, a children's radio network.

The first album was released in 1999, titled Radio Disney Kid Jams, containing the top songs from Radio Disney's playlist. Additional volumes of the Jams series were periodically released over time, dropping "Kid" from the titles. Special albums spun off from the series included two Holiday Jams albums, an Ultimate Jams with select songs from Jams 1-6, Jingle Jams (Series 2004 & 2005), Pop Dreamers, Move It, Party Jams from their tenth birthday concert, a 15th Birthday Edition, and a 2015 awards show edition.

The last volume of the series, Volume 12, was released on March 30, 2010, and the last two specials (15th Birthday Edition and Radio Disney Music Awards) were released on August 16, 2011, and April 21, 2015, respectively.

== Radio Disney Jams ==
=== Radio Disney: Kid Jams ===
Radio Disney: Kid Jams

Compilation album by various artists
- Released: March 16, 1999
- Genre: Pop
- Length: 64:08
- Label: Walt Disney Records

Radio Disney: Kid Jams is the first album of Radio Disney Jams. It is a compilation of artists whose songs were played on Radio Disney. It was released on both CD & cassette tape.

No.	Title	Recording artist(s)	Length
1.	"Get Ready for This"	2 Unlimited	3:45
2.	"Quit Playing Games (with My Heart)"	Backstreet Boys	3:52
3.	"Pump Up the Jam"	Technotronic	5:17
4.	"River"	Hanson	3:59
5.	"Whoomp! (There It Went)"	Tag Team	3:32
6.	"Macarena"	Los Del Rio	5:04
7.	"Hakuna Matata" (from The Lion King)	Soundtrack Cast Version	3:33
8.	"Yoda"	"Weird Al" Yankovic	4:16
9.	"U Can't Touch This"	MC Hammer	4:15
10.	"I'll Make a Man Out of You" (from Mulan)	Donny Osmond	3:19
11.	"Go, Speed Racer, Go!"	Sponge	3:07
12.	"Ghostbusters"	Ray Parker Jr.	4:18
13.	"Wipeout"	Steve Vai	2:53
14.	"I Got You (I Feel Good)"	James Brown	2:47
15.	"Let's Get Together"	MMC (featuring JC Chasez)	4:34
16.	"I Am Rubber"	I-8-Paste (Just Plain Mark & Zippy)	2:16
17.	"I'll Be There for You"	Solid HarmoniE	3:10

=== Radio Disney Jams, Vol. 2 ===
Radio Disney Jams, Vol. 2

Compilation album by various artists
- Released: February 28, 2000
- Genre: Pop
- Length: 66:15
- Label: Walt Disney Records

Radio Disney Jams, Vol. 2 is the second album of Radio Disney Jams, released by Walt Disney Records in 2000 on CD, and the last to be offered on cassette tape. The album is a compilation of several artists whose songs were regularly featured on Radio Disney. It peaked at No. 92 on the Billboard 200 and No. 1 on the Billboard Kid Albums chart. It was certified gold by the RIAA on January 22, 2002.

No.	Title	Recording artist(s)	Length
1.	"Disney Mambo #5 (A Little Bit Of...)"	Lou Bega	4:10
2.	"I'll Never Break Your Heart"	Backstreet Boys	4:45
3.	"Soda Pop"	Britney Spears	3:21
4.	"I'll Be Your Everything"	Youngstown	3:41
5.	"Just the Two of Us"	Will Smith	5:16
6.	"Reflection"	Christina Aguilera	3:35
7.	"The Saga Begins"	"Weird Al" Yankovic	5:28
8.	"Boogie Shoes"	K.C. and the Sunshine Band	2:45
9.	"True to Your Heart" (from Mulan)	98 Degrees and Stevie Wonder	4:14
10.	"We Will Rock You"	Queen	2:02
11.	"We Are the Champions"	Queen	3:01
12.	"We Are Family"	Sister Sledge	3:33
13.	"Y.M.C.A."	Village People	4:03
14.	"Boom Da Boom"	Goldo	2:44
15.	"One for Sorrow"	Steps	3:30
16.	"Girl You Shine"	Aaron Carter	3:55
17.	"Let's Go!"	I-8-Paste (Just Plain Mark & Zippy)	2:16
18.	"Lovin' You Lovin' Me"	Jason Raize	3:36

=== Radio Disney Jams, Vol. 3 ===
Radio Disney Jams, Vol. 3

Compilation album by various artists
- Released: February 13, 2001
- Genre: Pop
- Length: 52:49
- Label: Walt Disney Records

Radio Disney Jams, Vol. 3 is the third album in the Radio Disney Jams series, released on February 13, 2001. It peaked at No. 109 on the Billboard 200 on March 3, 2001, and No. 1 on the Billboard Kid Albums chart.

No.	Title	Recording artist(s)	Length
1.	"Back Here"	BBMak	3:40
2.	"Mamma Mia!"	A*Teens	3:43
3.	"All Star"	Smash Mouth	3:21
4.	"How Do I Feel?"	Hoku	2:57
5.	"Jumpin' Jumpin'" (Party mix)	Destiny's Child (featuring Solange Knowles)	3:33
6.	"The Hampsterdance Song"	Hampton the Hampster	3:34
7.	"Dance with Me" (Radio Disney Edit)	Debelah Morgan	3:39
8.	"Thinkin' About You"	Britney Spears	3:37
9.	"We Like to Party!"	Vengaboys	3:40
10.	"Don't Say You Love Me"	M2M	3:38
11.	"Vacation"	Vitamin C	3:21
12.	"Dancing in the Street"	Myra	3:42
13.	"If You Wanna Dance"	Nobody's Angel	3:40
14.	"Upside Down" (Radio Edit)	Tik N' Tak (featuring Steve Jaimes)	3:12
15.	"Valentino"	Bowling for Soup	3:31

=== Radio Disney Jams, Vol. 4 ===
Radio Disney Jams, Vol. 4

Compilation album by various artists
- Released: September 25, 2001
- Genre: Pop
- Length: 59:26
- Label: Walt Disney Records

Radio Disney Jams, Vol. 4 is the fourth volume in the Radio Disney Jams series. The album was released on September 25, 2001, and contains top songs from Radio Disney's playlist. The CD peaked at No. 169 on the Billboard 200 and No. 1 on the Billboard Kid Albums chart.

No.	Title	Recording artist(s)	Length
1.	"Halfway Around the World"	A*Teens	3:38
2.	"Bounce"	Aaron Carter	3:19
3.	"Perfect Day"	Hoku	3:27
4.	"The Answer to Our Life"	Backstreet Boys	3:16
5.	"No More (Baby I'ma Do Right)"	3LW	4:18
6.	"Blue (Da Ba Dee)"	Eiffel 65	3:28
7.	"Supergirl"	Krystal	3:39
8.	"It Happens Every Time"	Dream Street	3:08
9.	"Miracles Happen"	Myra	5:00
10.	"Who Woke Snow White Up"	Baha Men	3:10
11.	"Last Flight Out"	Plus One	3:55
12.	"Never Again"	True Vibe	3:30
13.	"I Wanna Be With You"	Mandy Moore	4:13
14.	"I Think I Love You"	Kaci	3:28
15.	"Spinnin' Around"	Jump5	3:41
16.	"I Wanna Love You Forever"	Jessica Simpson	4:22

=== Radio Disney Jams, Vol. 5 ===
Radio Disney Jams, Vol. 5

Compilation album by various artists
- Released: September 10, 2002
- Genre: Pop
- Length: 52:15
- Label: Walt Disney Records

Radio Disney Jams, Vol. 5 is the fifth installment in the Radio Disney Jams series containing popular songs from Radio Disney's playlist. It peaked at No. 122 on the Billboard 200 and No. 2 on the Billboard Kid Albums chart.

No.	Title	Recording artist(s)	Length
1.	"Call Me, Beep Me"	Christina Milian	2:39
2.	"Can't Help Falling in Love"	A*Teens	3:07
3.	"Juliet"	LMNT	3:41
4.	"Move It Like This"	Baha Men	3:25
5.	"Oh Aaron"	Aaron Carter (featuring Nick Carter and No Secrets)	3:18
6.	"I'm Gonna Make You Love Me"	Play (featuring Chris Trousdale)	3:08
7.	"What Makes You Different (Makes You Beautiful)"	Backstreet Boys	3:34
8.	"Everything"	M2M	4:22
9.	"Pop" (Deep Dish Cha-Ching Remix)	NSYNC	4:15
10.	"Get a Clue"	Simon and Milo	3:18
11.	"Kids in America"	No Secrets	3:06
12.	"Kryptonite"	3 Doors Down	3:55
13.	"Playas Gon' Play"	3LW	4:44
14.	"God Bless the U.S.A."	Jump5	3:21
15.	"I Say Yeah"	Dream Street	2:55

=== Radio Disney Jams, Vol. 6 ===
Radio Disney Jams, Vol. 6

Compilation album by various artists
- Released: September 9, 2003
- Genre: Pop
- Length: 50:09
- Label: Walt Disney Records
- Producer: Jay Landers

Radio Disney Jams, Vol. 6 is the sixth album in the Radio Disney Jams Series. It's a compilation of artists whose songs are played on Radio Disney. It peaked at No. 105 on the Billboard 200 and No. 3 on the Billboard Kid Albums chart.

No.	Title	Recording artist(s)	Length
1.	"I Can't Wait"	Hilary Duff	3:11
2.	"Dig It"	D-Tent Boys	3:46
3.	"Up, Up, Up"	Rose Falcon	2:52
4.	"You're the One"	LMNT	3:44
5.	"The Tide Is High (Get the Feeling)"	Atomic Kitten	3:21
6.	"Sing a Simple Song"	Hampton and the Hamsters	4:46
7.	"All I Can Do"	Jump5	3:12
8.	"That's So Raven"	Raven-Symoné	0:49
9.	"Us Against the World"	Play	3:41
10.	"Don't Stop Movin'"	S Club 7	3:50
11.	"My Baby"	Lil' Romeo	3:42
12.	"Last One Standing"	Triple Image	3:27
13.	"You Make Me Feel Like a Star"	The Beu Sisters	3:03
14.	"All for Love"	Stevie Brock	3:30
15.	"Floorfiller"	A*Teens	3:13

=== Radio Disney Jams, Vol. 7 ===
Radio Disney Jams, Vol. 7

Compilation album by various artists
- Released: March 22, 2005
- Genre: Pop
- Length: 52:08
- Label: Walt Disney Records
- Producer: Jay Landers

Radio Disney Jams, Vol. 7 is the seventh installment in Radio Disney's Jams music compilation series. Featuring artists regularly featured on Radio Disney, the album peaked at No. 109 on the Billboard 200 and No. 3 on the Billboard Kid Albums chart.

No.	Title	Recording artist(s)	Length
1.	"Come Clean"	Hilary Duff	3:34
2.	"Cinderella"	The Cheetah Girls	3:19
3.	"Punk Rock 101" (Radio Disney Version)	Bowling for Soup	3:01
4.	"Because You Live"	Jesse McCartney	3:18
5.	"Everywhere"	Michelle Branch	3:34
6.	"Geek Love" (Oh My Gosh Version)	fan 3	3:22
7.	"Backflip"	Raven-Symoné	3:53
8.	"Come On, Come On"	Smash Mouth	2:32
9.	"Tangled Up in Me"	Skye Sweetnam	2:52
10.	"Ordinary Day"	Vanessa Carlton	3:56
11.	"Graduation (Friends Forever)" (Radio Disney Version)	Vitamin C	4:23
12.	"Drama Queen (That Girl)"	Lindsay Lohan	3:27
13.	"The Naked Mole Rap"	Will Friedle and Nancy Cartwright	3:28
14.	"I'm Over It"	Everlife	3:33
15.	"Over It"	Anneliese van der Pol	3:48

Bonus DVD

1. "Tangled Up in Me" - Skye Sweetnam
2. "Because You Live" - Jesse McCartney
3. "Backflip" - Raven-Symoné
4. "The Naked Mole Rap" - Will Friedle and Nancy Cartwright
5. "Geek Love (Oh My Gosh Version)" - fan_3

=== Radio Disney Jams, Vol. 8 ===
Radio Disney Jams, Vol. 8

Compilation album by various artists
- Released: February 7, 2006
- Genre: Pop
- Length: 51:51
- Label: Walt Disney Records
- Producers: Robin Jones; Jay Landers
- Compiler: Dani Markman

Radio Disney Jams, Vol. 8 is the eighth album from the Radio Disney Jams series. Released by Walt Disney Records, the album is a compilation of several artists that have songs that were played on Radio Disney. It peaked at No. 70 on the Billboard 200 and No. 2 on the Billboard Kid Albums chart.

No.	Title	Recording artist(s)	Length
1.	"Do You Believe in Magic"	Aly & AJ	2:12
2.	"What's Your Name"	Jesse McCartney	3:31
3.	"Pon de Replay"	Rihanna	3:36
4.	"Fly"	Hilary Duff	3:42
5.	"Pop Princess"	The Click Five	4:27
6.	"Lonely" (Radio Disney Edit)	Akon	3:55
7.	"Dance 4 U" (Radio Disney Edit)	B5	3:56
8.	"The Cha Cha Slide" (Radio Disney Edit)	Mr. C The Slide Man	4:05
9.	"Shake a Tail Feather"	The Cheetah Girls	3:01
10.	"Axel F"	Crazy Frog	2:50
11.	"Sk8er Boi"	Avril Lavigne	3:23
12.	"Almost" (Radio Disney Edit)	Bowling for Soup	3:26
13.	"Just the Way I Am"	Skye Sweetnam	2:10
14.	"Go Figure"	Everlife	4:08
15.	"That's Good"	Devo 2.0	3:22

Target edition
No.	Title	Recording artist(s)	Length
16.	"I Won't Say (I'm in Love)"	The Cheetah Girls	3:03
17.	"Strangers Like Me"	Everlife	3:32

Bonus DVD

1. "Fly" - Hilary Duff
2. "What's Your Name?" - Jesse McCartney
3. "Do You Believe In Magic" - Aly & AJ
4. "Shake a Tail Feather" - The Cheetah Girls
5. "Just the Way I Am" - Skye Sweetnam

=== Radio Disney Jams, Vol. 9 ===
Radio Disney Jams, Vol. 9

Compilation album by various artists
- Released: March 13, 2007
- Length: 51:25
- Label: Walt Disney Records

Radio Disney Jams, Vol. 9 is the ninth album from the Radio Disney Jams series. It's a compilation of artists whose songs are played on Radio Disney. It peaked at No. 56 on the Billboard 200.

No.	Title	Recording artist(s)	Length
1.	"If We Were a Movie"	Miley Cyrus	3:03
2.	"Bad Day"	Daniel Powter	3:55
3.	"Come Back to Me"	Vanessa Hudgens	2:47
4.	"Life is a Highway"	Rascal Flatts	4:34
5.	"Strut"	The Cheetah Girls	3:18
6.	"Right Where You Want Me" (Radio Disney Edit)	Jesse McCartney	3:06
7.	"Unwritten"	Natasha Bedingfield	4:14
8.	"I Could Get Used to This"	Everlife	3:27
9.	"Dance with Me"	Drew Seeley	3:11
10.	"Cool"	Gwen Stefani	3:40
11.	"Vertical"	T-Squad	2:57
12.	"Chemicals React"	Aly & AJ	2:55
13.	"Wake Up"	Hilary Duff	3:37
14.	"Beverly Hills" (Radio Disney Edit)	Weezer	3:17
15.	"Start of Something New" (Live)	High School Musical Cast	4:47

Bonus DVD

1. "Best of Both Worlds" - Miley Cyrus
2. "Chemicals React" - Aly & AJ
3. "Vertical" - T-Squad
4. "Route 66" - The Cheetah Girls
5. "Find Yourself in You" - Everlife

=== Radio Disney Jams, Vol. 10 ===
Radio Disney Jams, Vol. 10

Compilation album by various artists
- Released: January 22, 2008
- Genre: Pop
- Length: 52:08
- Label: Walt Disney Records
- Producer: Jay Landers

Radio Disney Jams, Vol. 10 is the tenth album in the Radio Disney Jams series. Released on January 22, 2008, it's a compilation of popular songs played on Radio Disney. It peaked at No. 18 on the Billboard 200 and No. 16 on the Billboard Kid Albums chart.

No.	Title	Artist(s)	Length
1.	"Nobody's Perfect"	Miley Cyrus	3:20
2.	"That's Just the Way We Roll"	Jonas Brothers	2:51
3.	"Potential Breakup Song" (Radio Disney Edit)	Aly & AJ	3:39
4.	"Bet on It" (Remix)	Zac Efron	3:23
5.	"Be Good to Me" (Radio Disney Edit)	Ashley Tisdale	3:14
6.	"With Love"	Hilary Duff	3:02
7.	"Hey There Delilah"	Plain White T's	3:51
8.	"G.N.O. (Girl's Night Out)"	Miley Cyrus	3:35
9.	"Lean on Me"	Mitchel Musso	2:48
10.	"Bubbly"	Colbie Caillat	3:17
11.	"So Bring It On"	The Cheetah Girls	3:00
12.	"Wait for You"	Elliott Yamin	4:20
13.	"I Don't Think About It"	Emily Osment	2:58
14.	"Run It Back Again"	Corbin Bleu	2:52
15.	"Home"	Daughtry	4:17

Bonus DVD

1. "Nobody's Perfect" - Hannah Montana
2. "That's Just the Way We Roll" - Jonas Brothers
3. "Hey There Delilah" - Plain White T's
4. "Fabulous" - Ashley Tisdale and Lucas Grabeel
5. "Say OK" - Vanessa Hudgens

=== Radio Disney Jams, Vol. 11 ===
Radio Disney Jams, Vol. 11

Compilation album by various artists
- Released: January 27, 2009
- Genre: Pop
- Length: 50:21
- Label: Walt Disney Records

Radio Disney Jams, Vol. 11 is the eleventh album in the Radio Disney Jams series. It's a compilation of popular songs played on Radio Disney. It peaked at No. 41 on the Billboard 200 and No. 1 on the Billboard Kid Albums chart.

No.	Title	Recording Artist(s)	Length
1.	"Burnin' Up"	Jonas Brothers	2:55
2.	"Fly on the Wall"	Miley Cyrus	2:31
3.	"Crush"	David Archuleta	3:33
4.	"Teardrops on My Guitar" (Pop Version)	Taylor Swift	3:00
5.	"The In Crowd"	Mitchel Musso	3:25
6.	"Get Back"	Demi Lovato	3:18
7.	"Scream"	Zac Efron	3:56
8.	"Tell Me Something I Don't Know" (Radio Disney Version)	Selena Gomez	3:20
9.	"Leavin'" (Radio Disney Version)	Jesse McCartney	3:35
10.	"Goodbyes"	Savannah Outen	3:32
11.	"Amazed"	Vanessa Hudgens (featuring Lil Mama)	2:59
12.	"Future Love"	Varsity Fanclub	3:47
13.	"One Love"	Jordan Pruitt	3:00
14.	"Check Yes Juliet"	We the Kings	3:39
15.	"Distracted"	KSM	3:19

Bonus DVD

1. "Right Here, Right Now" - Zac Efron and Vanessa Hudgens
2. "Future Love" - Varsity Fanclub
3. "Burnin' Up" - Jonas Brothers
4. "Fly on the Wall" - Miley Cyrus
5. "One Love" - Jordan Pruitt
6. Making of the Album - Mitchel Musso
7. Meet the Band - KSM

=== Radio Disney Jams, Vol. 12 ===
Radio Disney Jams, Vol. 12

Compilation album by various artists
- Released: March 30, 2010
- Genre: Pop
- Length: 55:49
- Label: Walt Disney Records

Radio Disney Jams, Vol. 12 is the twelfth entry in the Radio Disney Jams series of compilation albums featuring popular songs played on Radio Disney. Released on March 30, 2010, CDs autographed by Justin Bieber were given out as codeword of the day prizes during the end of March. Radio Disney also had a grand prize in which the winner would go to a concert featuring all the singers. The winner was announced on Friday, April 2, 2010.

No.	Title	Recording artist(s)	Length
1.	"One Time" (Acoustic version)	Justin Bieber	3:11
2.	"Fireflies"	Owl City	3:48
3.	"Party in the U.S.A."	Miley Cyrus	3:22
4.	"Who I Am"	Nick Jonas & the Administration	4:05
5.	"Falling Down"	Selena Gomez & the Scene	3:04
6.	"Low Day"	Capra	3:17
7.	"Shout It!"	Mitchel Musso	3:38
8.	"Fallin' for You"	Colbie Caillat	3:37
9.	"He Could Be the One"	Miley Cyrus	3:00
10.	"A Different Side of Me"	Allstar Weekend	3:09
11.	"Here We Go Again"	Demi Lovato	3:45
12.	"Give Love a Try"	Jonas Brothers	3:23
13.	"No Surprise"	Daughtry	4:09
14.	"Magic"	Selena Gomez	2:49
15.	"Battlefield"	Jordin Sparks	3:59
16.	"Boy Crazy"	Jasmine Sagginario	3:25

== Holiday and Jingle Jams ==
=== Radio Disney Holiday Jams ===
Radio Disney Holiday Jams

Compilation album by various artists
- Released: October 31, 2000
- Genre: Christmas
- Label: Walt Disney Records

Radio Disney Holiday Jams is a Christmas album released by Walt Disney Records on October 31, 2000. On December 8, 2002, the album peaked on the Billboard charts, reaching No. 24 on the Holiday Albums chart, No. 19 on the Catalog Albums charts, and No. 4 on the Kids Albums chart.

1. "Jingle Bell Rock" - Bobby Helms
2. "Merry Christmas, Happy Holidays" - NSYNC
3. "Little Saint Nick" - The Beach Boys
4. "The Chipmunk Song (Christmas Don't Be Late)" - The Chipmunks
5. "Last Christmas" - Billie
6. "Rockin' Around the Christmas Tree" - Brenda Lee
7. "Frosty the Snowman" - Myra
8. "Deck the Halls" - SHeDAISY
9. "Jingle Bells" - The Singing Dogs
10. "Santa Claus Is Comin' to Town" - The Jackson 5
11. "Sleigh Ride" - Spice Girls
12. "Grandma Got Run Over by a Reindeer" - Elmo & Patsy
13. "A Holly Jolly Christmas" - Burl Ives
14. "Macarena Christmas" - Los Del Rio
15. "As Long as There's Christmas" - Peabo Bryson and Roberta Flack

=== Radio Disney Holiday Jams 2 ===
Radio Disney Holiday Jams 2

Compilation album by various artists
- Released: October 15, 2002
- Genre: Christmas
- Label: Walt Disney Records

Radio Disney Holiday Jams 2 is a Christmas album released by Walt Disney Records on October 15, 2002. The album contains a collection of popular Christmas songs.

1. "I Wish It Could Be Christmas Everyday" - A*Teens
2. "As Long As There's Christmas" - Play
3. "Wonderful Christmas Time" - Jump5
4. "Feliz Navidad" - Jose Feliciano
5. "It's Beginning to Look a Lot Like Christmas" - Johnny Mathis
6. "Santa Claus Lane" - Hilary Duff
7. "Here Comes Santa Claus" - Gene Autry
8. "Christmas Time" - Backstreet Boys
9. "Rudolph the Red-Nosed Reindeer" - Burl Ives
10. "Go Girlfriend (Have a Merry Christmas)" - No Secrets
11. "Santa Claus Is Comin' to Town" - B2K
12. "I Saw Mommy Kissing Santa Claus" - The Jackson 5
13. "The Chimney Song" - Bob Rivers
14. "My Christmas List" (Radio Disney Edit) - Simple Plan

=== Radio Disney Jingle Jams ===
Radio Disney Jingle Jams is a special collection of 17 Christmas carols tracks, both original and revived, featuring Hilary Duff, Raven-Symoné, Jesse McCartney, Aly & AJ, and Ashlee Simpson. It was released by Walt Disney Records during the winter seasons of 2004 and 2005.

==== 2004 release ====
Radio Disney Jingle Jams

Compilation album by various artists
- Released: October 12, 2004
- Genre: Christmas
- Label: Walt Disney Records

1. "Winter Wonderland" - Jesse McCartney - 2:50
2. "Santa Claus Lane" (North Pole Mix) - Hilary Duff 3:02
3. "Dear Santa" - The Beu Sisters - 2:57
4. "I Love Christmas" - fan_3 - 3:27
5. "Santa Claus Is Coming to Town" - Stevie Brock - 3:27
6. "Sleigh Ride" - Jump5 - 3:13
7. "Toy Town" - Christy Carlson Romano - 3:31
8. "One Way or Another" - Jesse McCartney - 3:28
9. "Jingle Bell Rock" - Aly & AJ - 2:41
10. "Run Rudolph Run" - Aaron Carter - 2:41
11. "My Christmas Wish" - Raven-Symoné - 3:29
12. "Christmas Past, Present and Future" - Ashlee Simpson - 2:42
13. "Have Yourself a Merry Little Christmas" - Greg Raposo - 3:23
14. "Why Doesn't Santa Like Me?" - Skye Sweetnam - 2:40
15. "White Christmas" - Stacie Orrico - 3:39
16. "Wild Christmas" - Huckapoo - 3:29
17. "Circle of Life" (Christmas version) - Circle of Stars - 4:15

==== 2005 release ====
Radio Disney Jingle Jams 2

Compilation album by various artists
- Released: October 11, 2005
- Genre: Christmas
- Label: Walt Disney Records

1. "Someday at Christmas" - B5 - 2:51
2. "Everyday is Christmas" - Everlife - 3:29
3. "Winter Wonderland" - Jesse McCartney - 2:50
4. "A Dream is a Wish Your Heart Makes" (Christmas version) - Circle of Stars - 3:47
5. "Santa Claus Lane" (North Pole mix) - Hilary Duff - 3:02
6. "Jingle Bell Rock" - Aly & AJ - 2:41
7. "I Love Christmas" - fan 3 - 3:27
8. "Feels Like Christmas" - Caleigh Peters - 2:58
9. "One Way or Another" - Jesse McCartney - 3:28
10. "Home for Christmas" - The Beu Sisters - 3:26
11. "Sleigh Ride" - Jump5 - 3:13
12. "Toy Town" - Christy Carlson Romano - 3:31
13. "Run, Rudolph, Run" - Aaron Carter - 2:41
14. "My Christmas Wish" - Raven-Symoné - 3:29
15. "Christmas Past, Present and Future" - Ashlee Simpson - 2:42
16. "Why Doesn't Santa Like Me?" - Skye Sweetnam - 2:40
17. "Circle of Life" (Christmas version) - Circle of Stars - 4:15

== Special and independent CDs ==
=== Radio Disney's Pop Dreamers ===
Radio Disney's Pop Dreamers

Compilation album by Julie Griffin, Patty Mattson, and Nadia Fay
- Released: August 20, 2002
- Genre: Pop
- Length: 33:04
- Label: Walt Disney Records
- Producers: Marco Marinangeli; Harold J. Kleiner

Radio Disney's Pop Dreamers is an album released by Walt Disney Records on August 20, 2002 for the doll line of the same name. The songs are performed by Julie Griffen, Patty Mattson, and Nadia Fay as Ari, Ella, and Gabrielle. The majority of the songs are covers of other songs, four of which are Disney Princess songs, along with five original songs, including a theme for each character.

It went on to reach No. 13 on Billboard's Top Kid Audio chart. The album is available for purchase from the U.S. iTunes Music Store.

1. "Be a Star"
2. "Beauty and the Beast" (originally performed by Angela Lansbury from the movie of the same name)
3. "We Got the Beat" (originally performed by The Go-Go's)
4. "If You Can Dream" (originally performed by Ella)
5. "Better Together" (originally performed by Ari)
6. "A Dream is a Wish Your Heart Makes" (originally performed by Ilene Woods from Cinderella)
7. "Walking on Sunshine" (originally performed by Katrina and the Waves)
8. "Part of Your World" (originally performed by Jodi Benson from The Little Mermaid)
9. "Between the Lines" (originally performed by Gabrielle)
10. "Do What We Wanna Do"
11. "Some Day My Prince Will Come" (originally performed by Adriana Caselotti from Snow White and the Seven Dwarfs)
12. "Give a Little Love" (originally performed by Ziggy Marley)

=== Radio Disney Ultimate Jams ===
Radio Disney Ultimate Jams

Compilation album by various artists
- Released: April 6, 2004
- Genre: Pop
- Label: Walt Disney Records

Radio Disney Ultimate Jams is a compilation of songs previously featured on the first six volumes of the Radio Disney Jams series. Released as a two-disc package by Walt Disney Records, it features a DVD containing music videos from six songs on the album. It peaked at No. 75 on the Billboard 200 and No. 182 on the Billboard Kid Albums chart.

1. "I Can't Wait" – Hilary Duff
2. "Dig It" – D-Tent Boys
3. "Spinnin' Around" – Jump5
4. "Juliet" – LMNT
5. "Blue (Da Ba Dee)" – Eiffel 65
6. "Get Ready for This" – 2 Unlimited
7. "Can't Help Falling in Love" – A*Teens
8. "Disney Mambo #5 (A Little Bit Of...)" – Lou Bega
9. "Y.M.C.A." – Village People
10. "I Got You (I Feel Good)" – James Brown
11. "You Make Me Feel Like a Star" – The Beu Sisters
12. "Pump Up the Jam" – Technotronic
13. "All for Love" – Stevie Brock
14. "The Hamster Dance" – Hampton the Hampster
15. "Move It Like This" – Baha Men

Bonus DVD

1. "Disney Mambo #5 (A Little Bit Of...)" – Lou Bega
2. "I Can't Wait" – Hilary Duff
3. "Spinnin' Around" – Jump5
4. "Hampster Dance" – Hampton the Hampster
5. "All for Love" – Stevie Brock
6. "Disneymania 2" (featuring Hilary Duff, Haylie Duff, Raven-Symoné, and Stevie Brock)

=== Radio Disney: Move It! ===
Radio Disney: Move It!

Compilation album by various artists
- Released: August 2, 2005
- Genre: Pop
- Length: 50:50
- Label: Walt Disney Records

Radio Disney: Move It! is a collection of songs that help kids move and exercise in relation to staying healthy.

No.	Title	Recording artist(s)	Length
1.	"We Will Rock You"	Queen	2:02
2.	"Move It Like This"	Baha Men	3:23
3.	"Everybody Dance Now"	C+C Music Factory	4:07
4.	"Le Freak"	Chic	3:43
5.	"Cha Cha Slide"	Mr. C The Slide Man	4:05
6.	"Macarena"	Los Del Rio	3:26
7.	"U Can't Touch This"	M.C. Hammer	4:15
8.	"I Got You (I Feel Good)"	James Brown	2:46
9.	"BYou"	Sabrina Bryan	3:30
10.	"Get Ready for This"	2 Unlimited	3:43
11.	"Kung Fu Fighting"	Carl Douglas	3:10
12.	"Limbo Rock Remix" (Miami Mix)	Chubby Checker	3:57
13.	"Who Let the Dogs Out"	Baha Men	2:44
14.	"Y.M.C.A."	Village People	3:42
15.	"Shout" (Part 1)	Isley Brothers	2:15

=== Radio Disney: Party Jams ===
Radio Disney: Party Jams

Compilation album by various artists
- Released: October 10, 2006
- Genre: Pop
- Length: 31:26
- Label: Walt Disney Records

Radio Disney: Party Jams is a collection of songs that celebrated Radio Disney's 10th birthday on November 18, 2006. The bonus DVD contains some performances from their Totally 10th Birthday Party concert that was held on July 22, 2006 at the Arrowhead Pond in Anaheim, California. A separate DVD containing the full concert performance was also released titled Radio Disney: Party Jams, The Concert.

No.	Title	Recording artist(s)	Length
1.	"BFS Birthday Song"	Bowling for Soup	2:05
2.	"Pumpin' Up the Party"	Miley Cyrus	3:09
3.	"We're All in This Together"	High School Musical Cast	3:51
4.	"Wake Up"	Hilary Duff	3:38
5.	"Rush"	Aly & AJ	3:10
6.	"What's Your Name?"	Jesse McCartney	3:40
7.	"Shake a Tail Feather"	The Cheetah Girls	3:04
8.	"Real Wild Child"	Everlife	3:15
9.	"Let's Groove"	B5	3:35
10.	"The Birthday Song"	T-Squad	2:00

Bonus DVD

1. "Who Said" (from the first season of Hannah Montana) by Miley Cyrus
2. "Best of Both Worlds" by Miley Cyrus
3. "Find Yourself in You" by Everlife
4. "Real Wild Child" by Everlife
5. "Rush" by Aly & AJ
6. "No One" by Aly & AJ
7. "The Party's Just Begun" by The Cheetah Girls
8. "Cheetah Sisters" by The Cheetah Girls
9. "Right Where You Want Me" by Jesse McCartney
10. "Beautiful Soul" by Jesse McCartney

=== Radio Disney Jams: 15th Birthday Edition ===
Radio Disney Jams: 15th Birthday Edition

Compilation album by various artists
- Released: August 16, 2011
- Genre: Pop
- Length: 51:58
- Label: Walt Disney Records

The Radio Disney Jams: 15th Birthday Edition was released on August 16, 2011. It is a compilation of songs that were frequently played on Radio Disney from 1999 through the time of its release in 2011. Before the album was released, Radio Disney hosted a concert featuring Cody Simpson, Nigel Pilkington, Dan Russell and Emma Tate.

No.	Title	Recording artist(s)	Length
1.	"Who Says" (Acoustic version)	Selena Gomez & the Scene	3:15
2.	"All Day"	Cody Simpson	3:07
3.	"Tonight Tonight" (Radio Disney Edit)	Hot Chelle Rae	3:20
4.	"21st Century Girl"	Willow Smith	3:00
5.	"Beautiful Soul"	Jesse McCartney	3:35
6.	"Not Your Birthday" (Radio Disney Edit)	Allstar Weekend	3:26
7.	"Watch Me"	Bella Thorne and Zendaya	2:56
8.	"Baby"	Justin Bieber (featuring Ludacris)	3:36
9.	"...Baby One More Time"	Britney Spears	3:30
10.	"Young Forever"	The Ready Set	3:24
11.	"Determinate" (from Lemonade Mouth)	Lemonade Mouth Cast	3:18
12.	"My Girl" (Radio Disney Edit)	Mindless Behavior	3:49
13.	"Waiting Outside the Lines"	Greyson Chance	3:53
14.	"Wake Up"	Hilary Duff	3:38
15.	"Keeping Secrets"	Kicking Daisies	3:55

=== Radio Disney Music Awards ===
Radio Disney Music Awards

Compilation album by various artists
- Released: April 21, 2015
- Genre: Pop
- Length: 49:09
- Label: Walt Disney Records

Radio Disney Music Awards was the last Radio Disney album released on April 21, 2015. It is a compilation of songs by nominees of the Radio Disney Music Awards in 2015.

Radio Disney Music Awards
No.	Title	Writer(s)	Artist(s)	Length
1.	"All About That Bass" (RD Version)	Meghan Trainor; Kevin Kadish	Meghan Trainor	3:07
2.	"Problem" (featuring Iggy Azalea)	Ariana Grande; Max Martin; Savan Kotecha; Ilya Salmanzadeh; Amethyst Kelly	Ariana Grande	3:13
3.	"The Heart Wants What It Wants" (RD Version)	Selena Gomez; Antonina Armato; David Jost; Tim James	Selena Gomez	3:47
4.	"Chains" (RD Version)	Jason Evigan; Danny Parker; Ammar Malik	Nick Jonas	3:22
5.	"Boss" (RD Version)	Taylor Parks; Jacob Kasher Hindlin; Daniel Kyriakides; Eric Frederic; Joseph Spargur; Gamal Lewis	Fifth Harmony	2:50
6.	"Let's Not Be Alone (Alright)" (RD Version)	Savan Kotecha; Kristian Lundin; Johan Carlsson; Carl Falk	R5	2:54
7.	"Shower"	Lukasz Gottwald; Henry Walter; Rebbeca Gomez; Theron Thomas; Timothy Thomas	Becky G	3:26
8.	"Can't Blame A Girl For Trying"	Meghan Trainor; Al Anderson; Chris Gelbuda	Sabrina Carpenter	2:49
9.	"Cool Kids"	Echosmith; Jeffrey David; Jesiah Dzwonek	Echosmith	3:57
10.	"Really Don't Care" (featuring Cher Lloyd) (RD Version)	Carl Falk; Rami Yacoub; Savan Kotecha; Demi Lovato; Cher Lloyd	Demi Lovato	3:20
11.	"American Dream"	Malcolm David Kelly; Tony Oller	MKTO	3:44
12.	"Somebody to You"	Savan Kotecha; Kristian Lundin; Carl Falk	The Vamps (featuring Demi Lovato)	3:02
13.	"Move Like This"	Alex Angelo; Dakari	Alex Angelo	3:12
14.	"Young Blood" (DJ Mike D Remix)	Mike Del Rio; Pheobe Ryan; Matt Parad; Beatrice Miller	Bea Miller	3:13
15.	"Wrapped Up" (Live)	Oliver Murs; Stephen Robson; Claude Kelly	Olly Murs	3:01
Total length:				49:09
