= Girl Can Rock =

Girl Can Rock may refer to:

- "Girl Can Rock" (Hilary Duff song), 2003
- The Girl Can Rock, 2004 video album
