= List of songs recorded by Haylie Duff =

The following is a list of songs recorded by American actress, singer, and songwriter Haylie Duff.

== Background ==
Duff began her music writing career, when she collaborated on her sister Hilary Duff's debut album Metamorphosis. Which made its chart debut in September 2003, peaking at number 1, and was later certified quadraple platinum by the Recording Industry Association of America (RIAA).

After the album's success, Hollywood Records approached Haylie about recording herself, and in 2004 she began work on her own debut album. The album tentatively titled Walk That Walk was expected to hit shelves in August 2004. The album hit a major roadblock, when its lead single "Screwed" was revealed to have also been recorded by Paris Hilton as the lead single off her own debut album Paris Is Burning. On July 12, USA Today revealed that Duff's version of "Screwed" would be released "in two weeks." Duff said, "Paris has talked to the people who wrote the song, and I think it's all under control now." The drama came to a head in August 2004, when Hilton's version leaked onto the internet the same week Duff's was supposed to be officially released. Though Duff's team originally had no comment, they later confirmed, "...[Duff] plans to include her version of the song on her own upcoming debut album, since she procured the first rights to record and release the song from both of the songwriters and from their publisher."

Despite the issues with "Screwed", Haylie Duff still performed it, as well as "The Joke", live as the opening act for Hilary's Most Wanted Tour.

In November 2004, while the Duffs were interviewed by MTV News about their next film project Material Girls. The reporter Corey Moss, asked about "Screwed". "I don't know, there's all sorts of stuff going on [with "Screwed"]," Haylie said, "Right now we're still recording and writing. I didn't sign the papers with Hollywood Records [Hilary's label]. …We're just working on some acting stuff right now and kind of deciding what we're going to do with the music." News about Haylie Duff's music career cooled, and in September 2005, Duff was asked if she was going to continue pursuing music. "I'd really like to. I just haven't been focused on it. After the first time when I was working on an album, I had all these problems with songs," Duff said referring to "Screwed". She went on to say, "I just don't like having a lot of drama in my life." Haylie continued to contribute to her sister's music until Hilary's last album with Hollywood Records, Dignity.

Duff has written and recorded material that has never been officially released. Many of her unreleased songs have been registered with professional bodies such as the United States Copyright Office, Broadcast Music Incorporated (BMI), and American Society of Composers, Authors and Publishers (ASCAP).

== Songs ==
Songs recorded by Haylie Duff(The writer(s) of each song can be viewed by selecting "show")
Song	Other performer(s)	Writer(s)	Originating album	Year	Ref.
"Babysitting Is A Bum Deal"	Seth MacFarlane	Walter Murphy; Seth MacFarlane	Family Guy: Live in Vegas	2005	
"Girl In The Band"	—N/a	Chico Bennett; Charlie Midnight	The Lizzie McGuire Movie	2003	
"Material Girl"	Hilary Duff	Peter Brown; Robert Rans	Girl Next	2006	
"On The Rise Again"	Kool G Rap		Half a Klip	2007	
"One In This World"	—N/a	Diane Warren	A Cinderella Story	2004	
"Our Lips Are Sealed"	Hilary Duff	Jane Wiedlin; Terence Hall	A Cinderella Story	2004	
"Same Old Christmas"	Hilary Duff	Charlie Midnight; Marc Swersky	Santa Claus Lane	2002	
"The Siamese Cat Song"	Hilary Duff	Sonny Burke; Peggy Lee	Disneymania 2	2004	
"Sweet Sixteen"	—N/a	Haylie Duff; Toran Caudell	Metamorphosis	2003	
"Sweetest Pain"	—N/a	Michael Mangini; Shelly Peiken	Raising Helen	2004	
"A Whatever Life"	—N/a	Desmond Child; Brendan Lynch	Stuck In The Suburbs	2004	
"What Dreams Are Made Of"	Hilary Duff	Dean Pitchford; Matthew Wilder	The Lizzie McGuire Movie	2003	
"What Dreams Are Made Of - Ballad Version"	Yani Gellman (Note: Duff and Gellman are uncredited as the song is only credited to the characters of Isabella and Paolo, who they perform as respectively.)	Dean Pitchford; Matthew Wilder	The Lizzie McGuire Movie	2003	

== Unreleased songs ==
Unreleased songs recorded by Haylie Duff
Song	Notes	Ref.
"Confidential"	Performed during Most Wanted Tour	
"Crush"	Included on a review copy of Walk the Walk	
"The Deal"	Written by Andreas Carlsson, Lisa Greene, and Savan Kotecha	
"It’s Different"	Performed during Most Wanted tour	
"Faded"	Included on a review copy of Walk the Walk	
"Holiday"	Included on a review copy of Walk the Walk	
"The Joke"	Written by Kevin DeClue, Haylie Duff, and Charles E. Kaufman	
"Just a Minute"	Included on a review copy of Walk the Walk	
"Kindness Kills"	Written by Patrik Berger, Haylie Duff, and Charles E. Kaufman; It is unknown whether a studio version was recorded	
"New York City"	Written by Kevin DeClue, and Haylie Duff	
"Screwed"	Written by Greg Wells, Kara DioGuardi, & Rob Cavallo; Simultaneously recorded by Paris Hilton, whose version leaked blocking Haylie's.	
"Walk the Walk"	Included on a review copy of Walk the Walk	
