= All Sides =

All Sides may refer to:

- All Sides (O.A.R. album), 2008
- All Sides (LMNT album), 2002
- AllSides, a company that evaluates media bias
- All Sides with Ann Fisher, WOSU-FM talk show
