= All Access Pass =

Video by Hilary Duff
- Released: November 4, 2003
- Recorded: 2002–2003
- Genre: Pop; teen pop; pop rock
- Length: 60 minutes
- Label: Buena Vista; Hollywood
- Director: Virgil P. Thompson; Tess Gallagher Thompson
- Producer: Maria Kleinman (exec.); Virgil P. Thompson; Tess Gallagher Thompson

Hilary Duff video chronology
All Access Pass (2003)	The Girl Can Rock (2004)

Hilary Duff: All Access Pass, commonly referred to as All Access Pass, is the first video album by American recording artist Hilary Duff, released on November 4, 2003 by Buena Vista and Hollywood Records. Directed and produced by Virgil P. and Tess Gallagher Thompson, the hour-long DVD features the music videos for Duff's songs "So Yesterday", "Why Not" and "I Can't Wait". All Access Pass also features behind-the-scenes videos of the former two music videos and her second studio album Metamorphosis (2003), and a live performance from Duff at Sessions@AOL. Duff has stated that the DVD also documents her two-year musical journey leading up to the release of Metamorphosis. To date, it has been certified double platinum in the United States and five-times platinum in Canada.

== Background ==
Duff said of All Access Pass, "This All Access Pass really shows the fun we had, and of course, the hard work that went into making my album Metamorphosis. [...] This DVD is very personal, as it gives an up-close look at my exciting and inspiring musical journey over the last two years."

== Content ==
All Access Pass features Duff's music videos for "So Yesterday", "Why Not" and "I Can't Wait", with videos documenting the making of the two former videos and Metamorphosis. The DVD also features Duff performing the songs "So Yesterday" and "Little Voice" at Sessions@AOL, a collection of photos and home videos of Duff, and a biography. The DVD also features a hidden remix video of "I Can't Wait".

== Track listing ==
Hilary Duff: All Access Pass – Music videos
No.	Title	Length
1.	"So Yesterday"	3:37
2.	"Why Not"	3:11
3.	"I Can't Wait"	1:01
Total length:		7:49

Hilary Duff: All Access Pass – Performances
No.	Title	Length
1.	"Sessions@AOL Performance"	7:10
2.	"Making of Sessions@AOL"	3:04
Total length:		10:14

Hilary Duff: All Access Pass – Behind the scenes
No.	Title	Length
1.	"Making of "So Yesterday" Video"	11:31
2.	"Making of "Why Not" Video"	2:42
3.	"Making of Metamorphosis Album"	8:03
Total length:		22:26

Hilary Duff: All Access Pass – Bonus features
No.	Title	Length
1.	"In the Studio – "Anywhere But Here" / "Love Just Is""	2:00
2.	"Photo Gallery & Home Movies"	2:32
3.	"Hilary Duff Biography"

== Credits and personnel ==
- Maria Kleinman – executive producer
- Virgil P. Thompson – director, producer
- Tess Gallagher Thompson – director, producer
- Enny Joo – art director, art designer

== Certifications ==
Region	Certification	Certified units/sales
Australia (ARIA)	Platinum	15,000^{^}
Canada (Music Canada)	5× Platinum	50,000^{^}
United States (RIAA)	2× Platinum	200,000^{^}
^{^} Shipments figures based on certification alone.

== Release history ==
Release dates and formats for All Access Pass
Region	Date	Format	Label	Ref.
Canada	November 4, 2003	DVD	Universal	
United States	November 4, 2003	DVD	Buena Vista; Hollywood	
