= I'll Be Your Everything =

I'll Be Your Everything may refer to:

- "I'll Be Your Everything" (Youngstown song)
- "I'll Be Your Everything" (Tommy Page song)
