= The Beu Sisters =

American pop-rock girl group

Beu Sisters
- Origin: Florida, United States
- Genres: Pop
- Years active: 2002–present
- Labels: S-Curve
- Members: Candice Beu; Christie Beu; Danielle Beu
- Past members: Jilaine (Beu) Shea

The Beu Sisters are a pop-rock girl group from New Smyrna Beach, Florida, consisting of sisters Candice Beu (born 1975), Christie Beu (born 1978), Jiliane (born 1983), and Danielle Beu (born 1987). Originally from New York City, the sisters were exposed to classic Broadway music at an early age. Their parents, both stage veterans, had performed in major theatrical productions. The family relocated to New Smyrna Beach in 1988, and by the late 1990s, they had formed an a cappella act. They were later discovered by songwriter and producer Desmond Child, who helped them sign a contract with S-Curve Records.

== History ==
In 2002, the Beu Sisters' first album, Decisions, was released. Nine of the thirteen tracks on the album were co-written by them. The album includes the lead single "I Was Only (Seventeen)", for which a music video was filmed. To promote their album, the Beu Sisters management Magus Entertainment secured them as the opening act on Kelly Clarkson and Clay Aiken's 2004 Independent Tour which spanned 32 cities.

In the meantime, the group featured on various soundtracks, including Disney productions: Ella Enchanted, Home on the Range, Disney Girlz Rock, Radio Disney Jingle Jams, Radio Disney Ultimate Jams, The Lizzie McGuire Movie soundtrack, and DisneyMania 2. They appeared on the Because of Winn-Dixie movie soundtrack and also contributed to the movie How to Lose a Guy in 10 Days, featuring Kate Hudson and Matthew McConaughey, in 2003.

After their tour with Kelly Clarkson and Clay Aiken, they were signed to an entertainment deal with Sony/Columbia Records, but delays led them to the unanimous decision to return home and release themselves of all contractual obligations. A new song, "What Do You Do in the Summer (When It's Raining?)", was released to radio in summer 2004.

In 2008, the group started working with music producer On-Dre Mendoza, while Jilaine decided to pursue a degree in marketing. Between 2011 and 2012, the Beu Sisters (minus Jilaine) made a comeback to the music scene and released three EPs in the Beu~tiful series under their own label, Beach Breakz Records.
