= LMNT =

Boy band

- Origin: New York City, New York and Orlando, Florida, United States
- Genres: Pop
- Years active: 2000–2003
- Labels: Atlantic; Walt Disney
- Past members: Bryan Chan; Mike Miller; Jonas Persch; Ikaika Kahoano; Matthew Morrison

LMNT (pronounced "element") was an American boy band that was active from 2000 to 2003. The group's name was selected by the band's original line-up from contest entries solicited by Teen People magazine. It at first consisted of three singers (Ikaika Kahoano, Bryan Chan and Mike Miller) who had all competed on the 2000 series Making the Band (which had resulted in the creation of the boy band O-Town). Matthew Morrison joined the group in 2001, making it a quartet, but he left after a year and was replaced by Jonas Persch. This line-up recorded the band's sole album, All Sides (2002).

== History ==
Three of LMNT's five members first met as potential candidates for ABC's 2000 reality television series Making the Band. Thousands of young men auditioned for what would eventually become the boy band O-Town. Hawaii native Ikaika Kahoano was originally selected as one of the five winners but an undisclosed dispute caused him to back out of the line-up.

Joined by fellow runners-up baritone Bryan Chan and Mike Miller, the bass vocalist, the three decided to form their own group. Matthew Morrison, later of TV show Glee, joined LMNT in 2001. LMNT was the headline pop act at the Linda Creed Breast Cancer Foundation Benefit Concert held in South Jersey in the spring of 2002. The group performed a live a capella rendition of Papa Was A Rolling Stone in tribute to honored guest Motown legend Richard Street, formerly of The Temptations. That same year, LMNT and Richard Street were featured on the cover of the debut issue of the entertainment quarterly R&B Showcase Magazine.

In the summer of 2002, LMNT opened for Britney Spears on her Dream Within a Dream tour, and toured the United States as part of the Pop 'Til You Drop! Tour, a 30-date tour headlined by A*Teens with other supporting acts, including Baha Men and Play.

LMNT performed in front of crowds in support of the Elizabeth Glaser Pediatric AIDS Foundation, 2002 A Time for Heroes Carnival, in Los Angeles, California. They recorded their own version of "A Whole New World" from Disney's Aladdin, for the Disneymania 2 CD, and "Open Your Eyes (To Love)", for The Lizzie McGuire Movie soundtrack. In 2002, the band performed at various U.S. high schools as part of a Clear Channel Communications contest, including Immaculata High School in Marrero, LA. Their song "Juliet" made it into the Lizzie McGuire episode "Lizzie in the Middle", where she falls in love with TV star Frankie Muniz.

The members last performed in a music video for their song "It's Just You", for the Kim Possible soundtrack. The group only consisted of Mike Miller, Bryan Chan, and Jonas Persch at this time. In 2003, the group disbanded, but some members went on to pursue different avenues.

== Members ==
Former members

- Bryan Chan (2000–2003)
- Mike Miller (2000–2003)
- Jonas Persch (2001–2003)
- Ikaika Kahoano (2000–2003)
- Matthew Morrison (2001)

== Discography ==
=== Studio albums ===
Title	Album details	Peak chart positions
Title	Album details	US Heat.
All Sides	Released: June 4, 2002; Label: Atlantic; Format: CD, cassette	40

=== Singles ===
Title	Year	Peak chart positions	Album
Title	Year	US Singles Sales	Album
"Juliet"	2001	49	All Sides

=== Compilation and soundtrack album appearances ===
- Radio Disney Jams, Vol. 5 (2002) ("Juliet")
- The Lizzie McGuire Movie soundtrack (2003) ("Open Your Eyes to Love")
- Radio Disney Jams, Vol. 6 (2003) ("You're the One")
- Kim Possible soundtrack (2003) ("It's Just You")
- Disneymania 2 (2004) ("A Whole New World")
- Radio Disney Ultimate Jams (2004) ("Juliet")
