= Just Plain Mark and Zippy =

- Just Plain Mark (left) and Zippy (right)
- Genre: Children's
- Running time: 4 p.m. – 8 p.m. Pacific
- Country of origin: United States
- Language: English
- Home station: Radio Disney
- Syndicates: Radio Disney affiliates and XM Radio
- Original release: 1997 – 2001

Just Plain Mark and Zippy were two Radio Disney DJs that aired weekday afternoons at 4:00 p.m. Eastern Time. Both DJs were on at the same time and their show lasted till 8:00 p.m. ET. Mark (real name: Mark Sutherland) and Zippy (real name: Gary Wallace) broadcast from Tomorrowland at Disneyland. Both Just Plain Mark and Zippy became Radio Disney DJs in 1997 and retired in 2001.

The duo formed a group called I-8-Paste. Two songs were produced and can only be found on Radio Disney Jams 1 and 2. "I Am Rubber" can be found on Jams 1 and "Let's Go" is on Jams 2. Although Just Plain Mark and Zippy did not appear anytime after, they hosted the launch party for Jams 3 at Disneyland in California.
