= So Yesterday =

2003 single by Hilary Duff

Single by Hilary Duff

from the album Metamorphosis
- B-side: "Girl Can Rock"; "Metamorphosis Megamix"; "Workin' It Out"
- Released: July 14, 2003
- Genre: Pop rock
- Length: 3:35
- Label: Buena Vista; Hollywood
- Songwriters: Lauren Christy; Scott Spock; Graham Edwards; Charlie Midnight
- Producer: The Matrix

Hilary Duff singles chronology
"Why Not" (2003)	"So Yesterday" (2003)	"Come Clean" (2004)

Music video
- "So Yesterday" on YouTube

"So Yesterday" is a song by American actress and singer Hilary Duff for her second studio album, Metamorphosis (2003). It was written and produced by The Matrix (a production team consisting of Lauren Christy, Scott Spock, and Graham Edwards), with additional writing from Charlie Midnight. The song is influenced by pop rock music, and the lyrics chronicle the protagonist getting over a breakup with her boyfriend, declaring him as "so yesterday". The song received mixed reviews from music critics, with some of them noting its close similarity to Avril Lavigne's works, while others named it one of Duff's best songs.

"So Yesterday" premiered on AOL Music's "First Listen" on June 27, 2003. It was serviced to mainstream radio in the United States on July 14, 2003. The song became Duff's first single to chart in the US Billboard Hot 100 where it reached number 42. It was more successful outside the US, reaching the top 40 in most countries it charted, peaking at number two in Canada, number six in Ireland, number eight in Australia and France, and number nine on the UK Singles Chart; in Australia the song was certified platinum.

The song was accompanied by a music video, directed by Chris Applebaum, which showed Duff playing a prank on her ex-boyfriend. It was successful on various music video channels like MTV and MuchMusic. Duff performed the song on her Metamorphosis Tour and has since performed it on all her concert tours. The song is also featured on the compilations Most Wanted (2005), 4Ever Hilary (2006) and Best of Hilary Duff (2008), and the 2009 music video game Band Hero.

== Background and release ==
Although Hilary Duff recorded songs like "I Can't Wait", "Why Not" and "What Dreams Are Made Of", which received substantial airplay on Radio Disney, executives at Buena Vista Music Group, Duff's record label, planned to help her reach a more mature audience. So, Andre Recke, an executive at Buena Vista, along with Duff and her mother Susan Duff, enlisted the songwriting and production team The Matrix (consisting of Lauren Christy, Scott Spock and Graham Edwards) to produce songs for Duff's second studio album Metamorphosis (2003). "So Yesterday" became one of three songs produced by the team for the album, and was the last song recorded for the album. Duff herself has said that when she first heard the song, she did not really like it; however, her opinion changed after she listened to it more often. She then decided she would give the song a "100 percent" and not comment negatively of it. According to her, she "ended up loving it", stating, "It was such a fun song, and it means a lot." Bob Cavallo, chairman of Buena Vista Records, said that the song was "more mature than the past work that she's done."

"So Yesterday" premiered on AOL Music's "First Listen" on June 27, 2003, and it drew over 500,000 streams in two days. It was released to mainstream radio in the United States on July 15, and was the "most added" song on the format in its first two weeks of release. The song is featured on all of Duff's compilations album, including Most Wanted (2005), 4ever (2006) and her greatest hits album, Best of Hilary Duff (2008). It is also featured on the 2009 music video game Band Hero as a bonus download.

A re-recorded version of the song was featured on Duff's third extended play (Mine), which was released to streaming and digital download platforms on May 29, 2026.

== Composition ==
So Yesterday
The chorus of "So Yesterday", backed by guitars and percussion. The song incorporates elements of pop rock music.

Lyrically, "So Yesterday" talks about someone who has got over a broken relationship, declaring the partner as "so yesterday". According to Duff, the song's lyrics are very empowering towards breaking up with someone and getting over it. In a 2006 interview with Instinct, Duff said that people often told her that "So Yesterday" was "the ultimate post-breakup anthem". She said her mother Susan Duff instilled the notion of inner strength in her, and that she wanted the music she makes to be positive. "I don't think there's very much of that out there anymore.", she said. She stressed the importance of strong songs that are not all about how "a boy broke your heart and you're never going to get on your feet again", saying it was good for girls to hear.

Musically, "So Yesterday" is moderately paced, with influences of pop and rock music and moves at a tempo of 76 bpm. The song is set in the signature of common time, and is written in the key of C major. The song has the sequence of Am–G–Fmaj7 as its chord progression. Duff's vocal range in the song spans from the note of G3 to the note of A4.

== Critical reception ==
Upon its release, the song received mixed reviews from critics. Stephen Thomas Erlewine of AllMusic gave a positive review and commented that the song sounded natural coming from a teenager like Duff. He also noted the influence of Avril Lavigne on the song. Billboard gave a mixed review, also commenting on Lavigne's influence on the song. Similarly, Spence D. of IGN Music was mixed in his review stating, "[it's] like bubblegum ice cream: smooth and sweet at first listen, but the flavor eventually wears off, leaving somewhat generic pop anthems that will most likely be forgotten by the aforementioned throngs of young girl worshippers as they age along with Duff." While reviewing Duff's compilation Most Wanted, Talia Kraines of BBC Music commented that the song was Duff's best. Similarly, Sal Cinquemani of Slant Magazine, noted the track as "kind of cute." Elysa Gardner of USA Today gave a negative review on the song's title writing, "[That] song title may, unfortunately, prove prophetic for an artist who seems so content to merely ride the wave of the moment".

== Commercial performance ==
"So Yesterday" debuted on the Billboard Hot 100 of August 16, 2003, at number 53 and eventually peaked at number 42. It spent 20 weeks on the Hot 100. The song topped the US Billboard Hot 100 Singles Sales chart, making Duff the first artist in four months not affiliated with American Idol to top the chart. The song peaked at number two in Canadian Singles Chart. In Australia, the song debuted at number 39, peaked at number eight in its eighth week, and remained on the chart for 20 weeks. It was the 49th-best-selling single of 2003 in Australia, and was certified platinum in 2004. In United Kingdom, the song debuted at number nine on the UK Singles Chart. The song peaked within the top 10 on the charts in other European countries such as Ireland, the Netherlands, and France. As of July 27, 2014, the song had sold 252,000 digital copies in the United States and has been certified gold by the Recording Industry Association of America for equivalent sales of 500,000 units.

== Music video ==
The music video premiered on MTV on July 24, 2003. It was directed by Chris Applebaum. It was also featured on MTV's Making the Video two days after the video's premiere on July 26, 2003. According to Disney Music Group chairman Bob Cavallo, care was taken to see that the video would not be offensive to Duff's young fans and parents, but would work for MTV.

In the video, Duff's plays a break-up prank on her aloof boyfriend. While he is at the beach, she steals his clothes, including an orange T-shirt that reads "Everything is bigger in Texas!". She spends several days taking snapshots of strangers wearing the T-shirt and anonymously sneaking them into his mailbox. His bewilderment turns to dismay when he receives the final package returning the garment along with a picture of Duff smiling, looking back, and wearing a shirt that declares, "you're so yesterday". Throughout the whole video, Duff is shown performing the song with her band. The music video ranked at number one on Total Request Live. It was a staple on TRL UK, the UK incarnation of Total Request Live, reaching a peak of number four. In late August 2003 it was the most streamed music video on AOL.

== Live performances ==
"So Yesterday" was performed at the 31st American Music Awards in November 2003. The song was also performed at the British chart program Top of the Pops in 2003. Duff performed an acoustic version of the song at Sessions@AOL and Studio Disney. Apart from the live television performances, the song has been performed on all of Duff's tours, including her debut Metamorphosis Tour (2003). The live acoustic performance at Sessions@AOL was taped and is featured on Duff's video compilation All Access Pass, and the performance at the Metamorphosis tour is featured on Duff's 2004 live video compilation, The Girl Can Rock.

== Track listings ==
- American, Canadian and Japanese CD single
1. "So Yesterday" – 3:33
2. "Workin' It Out" – 3:20
- French and German CD single
1. "So Yesterday" – 3:34
2. "So Yesterday" (Thunderpuss mix) – 4:17
- Australian CD maxi single
1. "So Yesterday" – 3:34
2. "So Yesterday" (Thunderpuss mix) – 4:16
3. "So Yesterday" (dance mix) – 3:37
4. "Workin' It Out" – 3:21
5. "So Yesterday" (video)
- UK CD maxi single 1 and German CD maxi single
1. "So Yesterday" – 3:37
2. "Girl Can Rock" – 3:10
3. "Metamorphosis Megamix" – 5:33
- UK CD maxi single 2 and French CD maxi single
1. "So Yesterday" – 3:36
2. "Workin' It Out" – 3:17
3. "So Yesterday" (Thunderpuss mix) – 4:18

== Credits and personnel ==
Credits and personnel are adapted from the Metamorphosis album liner notes.

- Hilary Duff – lead vocals
- The Matrix – production, arrangement, recording, mixing
- Lauren Christy – songwriting
- Scott Spock – songwriting
- Graham Edwards – songwriting
- Charlie Midnight – songwriting
- Stephen Marcussen – mastering

== Charts ==
=== Weekly charts ===
Weekly chart performance for "So Yesterday"
Chart (2003–2004)	Peak position
Australia (ARIA)	8
Belgium (Ultratop 50 Flanders)	11
Belgium (Ultratop 50 Wallonia)	24
Canada (Nielsen SoundScan)	2
France (SNEP)	8
Germany (GfK)	46
Ireland (IRMA)	6
Japan (Oricon)	199
Netherlands (Dutch Top 40)	5
Netherlands (Single Top 100)	4
New Zealand (Recorded Music NZ)	23
Scottish Singles Sales (Official Charts)	7
Spain (Promusicae)	17
Switzerland (Schweizer Hitparade)	28
UK Singles (Official Charts)	9
US Billboard Hot 100	42
US Pop Airplay (Billboard)	15

=== Year-end charts ===
2003 year-end chart performance for "So Yesterday"
Chart (2003)	Position
Australia (ARIA)	49
Ireland (IRMA)	43
Netherlands (Dutch Top 40)	64
Netherlands (Single Top 100)	68
UK Singles (OCC)	169
US Mainstream Top 40 (Billboard)	81

2004 year-end chart performance for "So Yesterday"
Chart (2004)	Position
Belgium (Ultratop 50 Flanders)	73
France (SNEP)	74

== Certifications ==
Certifications and sales for "So Yesterday"
Region	Certification	Certified units/sales
Australia (ARIA)	Platinum	70,000^{^}
United States (RIAA)	Gold	500,000^{‡}
^{^} Shipments figures based on certification alone.^{‡} Sales+streaming figures based on certification alone.

== Release history ==
Release dates and formats for "So Yesterday"
Region	Date	Format	Label(s)	Ref.
United States	July 14, 2003	Contemporary hit radio	Buena Vista; Hollywood	
Canada	July 29, 2003	CD single	Buena Vista; Hollywood	
United States	July 29, 2003	CD single	Buena Vista; Hollywood	
Australia	September 8, 2003	CD single	Buena Vista; Hollywood; Festival Mushroom	
United Kingdom	October 20, 2003	CD single	Buena Vista; Hollywood	
Japan	October 22, 2003	CD single	Buena Vista; Hollywood	
France	January 5, 2004	CD single	Buena Vista; Hollywood	
Germany	March 29, 2004	CD single	Buena Vista; Hollywood	
