= The Girl Can Rock =

Video by Hilary Duff
- Released: August 10, 2004
- Recorded: November 21, 2003
- Venue: Ventura Theatre, Ventura, California
- Genre: Pop rock
- Length: 120 minutes
- Label: Hollywood
- Producer: Stuart Radford

Hilary Duff video chronology
All Access Pass (2003)	The Girl Can Rock (2004)	Learning to Fly (2004)

Alternate cover
- Japanese edition cover

Hilary Duff: The Concert – The Girl Can Rock, commonly referred to as The Girl Can Rock, is the first live video album by American recording artist Hilary Duff, released on August 10, 2004, by Hollywood Records. It contains a full concert from Ventura Theatre, Ventura, California and an accompanying music video for her single "Come Clean". Some special features of the DVD include Duff's appearance on Ryan Seacrest's On Air television program and her getting her first surfing lesson. In addition, the DVD contains footage of Duff recording "Crash World" and an interview with Duff discussing her self-titled album. Duff's DVD won the DVDX Award for Best Overall DVD in the Music Program. The DVD was nominated for the home video VSDA Award. The album was also certified four times platinum in Canada by Canadian Recording Industry Association (CRIA).

== Track listing ==
Hilary Duff: The Concert – The Girl Can Rock – The concert
No.	Title	Writer(s)	Length
1.	"Girl Can Rock"	Charlie Midnight; Denny Weston Jr.	3:29
2.	"Little Voice"	Kara DioGuardi; Patrik Berger	4:02
3.	"Come Clean"	DioGuardi; John Shanks	3:43
4.	"So Yesterday"	Lauren Christy; Scott Spock; Graham Edwards; Midnight	3:34
5.	"Anywhere But Here"	Jim Marr; Wendy Page; Chico Bennett	3:46
6.	"Metamorphosis"	Hilary Duff; Midnight; Bennett; Andre Recke	3:33
7.	"Sweet Sixteen"	Haylie Duff; Toran Caudell	3:17
8.	"Where Did I Go Right?"	Christy; Spock; Edwards; Midnight	3:57
9.	"Love Just Is"	Marr; Page; Midnight	5:09
10.	"Why Not"	Midnight; Matthew Gerrard	3:02
11.	"The Math"	Christy; Spock; Edwards; Midnight	3:21
12.	"Workin' It Out"	Midnight; Charlton Pettus; Marc Swersky	4:06
13.	"Party Up"	Meredith Brooks; Taylor Rhodes; Ashley George	3:56
Total length:			48:53

Hilary Duff: The Concert – The Girl Can Rock – Behind the scenes (bonus feature)
No.	Title	Length
1.	"Hilary's New Album"	5:34
2.	"The Tour"	29:35
3.	"The "Come Clean" Video"	10:01
Total length:		45:10

Hilary Duff: The Concert – The Girl Can Rock – Music videos (bonus feature)
No.	Title	Director(s)	Length
1.	"Come Clean"	Dave Meyers	3:32
2.	"So Yesterday" (Live)		3:39
Total length:			7:11

Hilary Duff: The Concert – The Girl Can Rock – Interviews and featurettes (bonus feature)
No.	Title	Length
1.	"Hilary on air with Ryan Seacrest"	8:38
2.	"Hilary Hangs Ten"	1:29
3.	"Photo Gallery"
4.	"Sneak Peaks" (A Cinderella Story soundtrack & Lizzie McGuire on DVD)	2:19
Total length:		12:26

Hilary Duff: The Concert – The Girl Can Rock – Japanese edition (bonus CD)
No.	Title	Length
1.	"Why Not" (McMix)
2.	"So Yesterday" (Radio Edit Remix)
3.	"Come Clean" (Cut to the Chase Club Mix)
4.	"Party Up" (Rob Chiarelli Dance Remix)
5.	"Anywhere But Here" (Live from The WB Island Birthday Bash special)
6.	"Metamorphosis" (Album version)
7.	"Come Clean" (Joe Bermudez & Josh Harris Pop Mix: Main Mix)
8.	"So Yesterday" (Joe Bermudez Mixshow Mix)
9.	"Come Clean" (Flood Remix Flood)

== Charts ==
=== Weekly charts ===
Chart (2004)	Peak position
Japanese Albums (Oricon)	78

== Certifications ==
Region	Certification	Certified units/sales
Australia (ARIA)	Platinum	15,000^{^}
Canada (Music Canada)	5× Platinum	50,000^{^}
^{^} Shipments figures based on certification alone.

== Release history ==
Release dates and formats for The Girl Can Rock
Region	Date	Format	Label	Ref.
Canada	August 10, 2004	DVD	Universal	
United States	August 10, 2004	DVD	Buena Vista; Hollywood	
Australia	August 23, 2004	DVD	Festival Mushroom	
Japan	October 14, 2004	CD+DVD	Avex Trax	
Germany	November 1, 2004	DVD	Universal	

== Awards and nominations ==
Award	Category	Result
DVDX Award	Best Overall DVD in the Music Program	Won
VSDA Award	Home Video	Nominated
