= All Sides (LMNT album) =

Studio album by LMNT
- Released: June 4, 2002
- Studios: Big Baby Recording, New York, NY; Chung King Studios, NY; E.S.P. Sound Studios; Epicentre Studio, Stockholm Sweden; Hit Factory, NY; Kokopelli Sounds, Miami, FL; Kondor Music, NY; Quad Studios, New York, NY; Rhythm Attic Studios, NY; Stargate Studios, Norway; The Record Plant, Los Angeles, CA
- Genres: Pop, teen pop, dance-pop
- Length: 41:19
- Label: Atlantic
- Producers: John Poppo, Soulshock, Ander Wikstrom, Karlin, Craig Kallman, Peter Zizzo, Stargate, Steve Morales, Rich Christina, Jimmy Bralower, Robbie Nevil

LMNT chronology
All Sides (2002)	The Lizzie McGuire Movie Soundtrack (2003)

All Sides is a 2002 album by multi-cultural pop music boy band LMNT, and the group's sole album.

== Reception ==
All Sides was released after the American boy band craze had already peaked; the bands NSYNC and the Backstreet Boys, for example, were already on hiatus by June 2002. The album did gain some modest success, as the single "Juliet" managed to reach number one on Radio Disney, where it remained for eight consecutive weeks. It also reached No. 49 on the Billboard Hot 100 Singles Sales Chart. However, it ultimately failed to gain the group any significant popularity.

Professional ratings
Review scores
Source	Rating
Allmusic	1.5/5 stars
Entertainment Weekly	D

The album received generally negative reviews. AllMusic.com reviewer Michael Gallucci stated: "Their debut album is filled with post-millennium teen pop and all of its trappings", criticizing the use of "forced slang, suburban hip-hop touches, and a canned, manufactured sound that's both insincere and fake". Entertainment Weekly reviewer Kristen Baldwin wasn't impressed, either: "[LMNT] is unlikely to revive the [Boy Band] genre". Both reviewers also stated that they were little more than rejects from the ABC/MTV reality show, Making the Band, and as such, there wasn't much to be expected from their sound.

== Track listing ==
No.	Title	Writer(s)	Length
1.	"Girl Crazy"	Steve Morales, Howell, Sigel, Solomonoff, Bermudez, Soloman	3:32
2.	"Juliet" (Top 40 Edit)	Tony Marty, Anders Wikstrom, Fredrik Thomander	3:40
3.	"Get It All"	Kasia Livingston, Robbie Nevil, Fredrik Thomander, Anders Wikstrom	3:38
4.	"The Best"	Jason Blume, Keith Follesé	4:07
5.	"Forget to Forget"	Billy Crawford, Peter Zizzo	3:40
6.	"Shangri La"	Stargate, Hallgeir Rustan, S. Robinson, R. Nevelle	3:20
7.	"Keep it Coming"	Soulshock, P. Biker, Philip "Silky" White, N. Butler, K. Mantronik	3:25
8.	"Hold Me Down"	Stargate, Hallgeir Rustan	4:11
9.	"It's Your Love"	Stephony Smith	3:54
10.	"Running Home"	Bryan Chan, John Poppo, John Peppard	4:16
11.	"Greatest Gift"	J. Kempster, S. Hosford	4:16

== Charts ==
Chart (2002)	Peak position
US Heatseekers Albums (Billboard)	40
