= Inspector Gadget (film) =

1999 film by David Kellogg

- Theatrical release poster
- Directed by: David Kellogg
- Screenplay by: Kerry Ehrin; Zak Penn
- Story by: Kerry Ehrin; Dana Olsen
- Based on: Inspector Gadget by Andy Heyward; Jean Chalopin; Bruno Bianchi
- Produced by: Jordan Kerner; Roger Birnbaum; Andy Heyward
- Starring: Matthew Broderick; Rupert Everett; Joely Fisher; Michelle Trachtenberg; Mike Hagerty; Andy Dick; Cheri Oteri; Dabney Coleman
- Cinematography: Adam Greenberg
- Edited by: Alan Cody; Thom Noble
- Music by: John Debney
- Production companies: Walt Disney Pictures; Caravan Pictures; DIC Entertainment; Avnet/Kerner Productions; Roger Birnbaum Productions
- Distributed by: Buena Vista Pictures Distribution
- Release date: July 23, 1999
- Running time: 78 minutes
- Countries: United States; France
- Language: English
- Budget: $75–90 million
- Box office: $134 million

Inspector Gadget is a 1999 superhero comedy film directed by David Kellogg and written by Kerry Ehrin and Zak Penn from a story by Ehrin and Dana Olsen. Loosely based on the 1983–1985 animated television series of the same name, the film stars Matthew Broderick as the title character, Rupert Everett as Dr. Claw, Michelle Trachtenberg as Penny, and Dabney Coleman as Chief Quimby. Five new characters were introduced: Dr. Brenda Bradford (played by Joely Fisher), Sykes (played by Mike Hagerty), Kramer (played by Andy Dick), Mayor Wilson (played by Cheri Oteri) and the Gadgetmobile (voiced by D. L. Hughley). The film tells the origin story of Inspector Gadget as he attempts to foil an evil plot concocted by the series villain, Dr. Claw. It was filmed in Pittsburgh, Pennsylvania; Baton Rouge, Louisiana; and Los Angeles, California, with the castle-like main tower of Pittsburgh's PPG Place playing a central role.

Produced by Walt Disney Pictures, Caravan Pictures and DIC Entertainment (which was owned by The Walt Disney Company at the time of production), the film was released theatrically by Buena Vista Pictures Distribution on July 23, 1999. It was the last film produced by Caravan Pictures, before the company merged into Spyglass Entertainment. It was also dedicated to the memory of production designer Michael White, who died on January 19, 1999, in Los Angeles during production of the film at the age of 36.

The film was a box office bomb of $134 million against a $75–90 million budget, and lost the studio approximately $30 million. It also received negative reviews from critics, who gave some praise towards the score and the performances of Everett and Trachtenberg, but criticized the screenplay, visual effects, editing, humor, Broderick's performance, and lack of faithfulness to the source material (particularly with Dr. Claw showing his face). It was followed by the 2003 direct-to-video sequel Inspector Gadget 2, though only D. L. Hughley reprised his role as the voice of the Gadgetmobile.

== Plot ==
John Brown lives in the city of Riverton with his 12-year-old niece, Penny Brown, and her pet beagle, Brain. Dreaming of becoming a police officer, John works as a security guard for the Bradford robotics laboratory. Artemus Bradford and his daughter, Brenda, are designing a lifelike robotic foot as part of the Gadget Program, designed to add android officers to the Riverton Police Department. Sanford Scolex, a malicious tycoon, uses a robotic tank to break into the Bradford laboratory and steal the foot to build an army of androids from its technology, murdering Artemus in the process. John chases after Scolex's limousine in his hatchback, but John's car gets flipped over due to an oil slick from Scolex's limo, leading both vehicles to crash into a Yahoo billboard. John is blown up in his capsized car by a dynamite stick disguised as a cigar and left for dead, but a bowling ball launched by the explosive blast from the destroyed car lands in the limo and crushes Scolex's left hand; Scolex receives a mechanical claw from his associate, Kramer, taking on the alias "Dr. Claw".

Brenda decides to make John, whose body is now mangled, as he also nearly died of severe injuries from the car explosion, the first test subject for the Gadget Program. She builds an array of gadgets into his body and gives him the alias "Inspector Gadget", inserting a control chip as his power supply. Brenda and a local guru give John an orientation on using his new gadgets, which goes awry when the guru is hospitalized by a pinch to the testicles inadvertently caused by John, causing the guru's voice pitch to rise. He is helped by the Gadgetmobile, a robotic car with a chatty AI. Despite struggling with his new gadgets, John stops two criminals trying to rob a car after stealing a cat.

At a charity ball, Scolex approaches Brenda, having known her at Harvard, inviting her to work for him in her own laboratory. Brenda accepts, unaware that Scolex plans to steal her technological ideas and designs. Unimpressed with John, Riverton Police Chief Frank Quimby assigns him to menial assignments rather than investigate Artemus' murder. Upset at not being taken seriously, John begins investigating Artemus' murder on his own and finds a piece of scrap metal, which he later connects to Scolex with Penny's help.

Scolex uses Brenda's research to build his own android, "Robo-Gadget", sending him out on a rampage across Riverton to frame John, who infiltrates Scolex's lab to recover the foot but is caught and deactivated when Scolex breaks his chip. Scolex's minion, Sykes, dumps John in a junkyard and is then tasked to dispose of the foot. Brenda encounters her own robotic doppelgänger, Robo-Brenda, who confirms that Scolex stole the foot and murdered her father. Brenda, Penny, Brain, and the Gadgetmobile track John to a junkyard, where a kiss from Brenda awakens him, proving John's human willpower can control his new body without the chip.

After dropping Penny and Brain off at home for their safety, John and Brenda chase Scolex and Robo-Gadget's limo. John and Robo-Gadget fall off the roof and duel on a bridge until John removes the latter's head, tossing it into the river, though Robo-Gadget's body strips John's pants off and runs away. Brenda crashes the Gadgetmobile into Scolex's limo but is taken prisoner. Scolex tries to escape in a helicopter with her, but John appears using his helicopter hat to intercept. Scolex destroys it, and John is stuck hanging from the landing skis. John deconstructs a pen in his finger, whilst remembering the "visualizing [his] goal" advice from the guru, and launches the metal ink chamber, sending it bouncing around until it hits a button on Scolex's claw, causing it to clamp shut and break the joystick of the helicopter. Brenda leaps out of the spinning helicopter onto John's back, and they fall down the side of Scolex's skyscraper, using a parasol to land safely. Scolex parachutes down but lands in the Gadgetmobile and is captured by it. The police arrive to arrest John for Robo-Gadget's rampage, but Penny appears with a repentant and reformed Sykes, who confesses his boss' crimes to the police. Saluted and acknowledged by Quimby as an actual member of the police force, John departs with Brenda and Penny while Scolex vows revenge as he is taken away by the cops. The film ends with John and Brenda beginning a relationship, and Gadgetmobile driving after a red car.

== Cast ==
- Matthew Broderick as John Brown / Inspector Gadget and Robo-Gadget
- Rupert Everett as Sanford Scolex / Dr. Claw
- Joely Fisher as Dr. Brenda Bradford and Robo-Brenda
- Michelle Trachtenberg as Penny Brown
- Michael G. Hagerty as Sykes
- Andy Dick as Kramer
- René Auberjonois as Dr. Artemus Bradford
- D. L. Hughley as the voice of the Gadgetmobile
- Dabney Coleman as Chief Frank Quimby
- Cheri Oteri as Mayor Wilson
- Frances Bay as Thelma
- J. P. Manoux as The Mayor's Sycophantic Assistant
- Brian George as The Sore Guru
- Richard Penn as Fantastic Doctor
- Sonya Eddy as Hospital Secretary
- Andy Heyward as Mr. D.I.C.
- Don Adams as the voice of Brain

During the "Minions Anonymous" scene in the credits, the henchmen include Mr. T and Richard Kiel (who is credited as the "Famous Bad Guy with Silver Teeth", in reference to his role of James Bond's enemy Jaws), as well as Richard Lee-Sung as the "Famous Villain with Deadly Hat", Bobby Bell as the "Famous Identifier of Sea Planes", Hank Barrera as the "Famous Native American Sidekick", Jesse Yoshimura as "Bane of the Bumbling, Idiotic Yet Curiously Successful French Detective's Existence", John Kim as "Son Before Second Son", and Keith Morrison as the "Famous Assistant to Dr. Frankensomething".

== Production ==
=== Development ===
Universal Pictures at one point had an option on the film rights to the animated television series in 1993. Ivan Reitman signed on to produce with a script by Jeph Loeb and Matthew Weisman. Inspector Gadget moved to Disney when the film studio bought out DIC Entertainment. At one point, Peter and Bobby Farrelly were considered to write and direct. Disney eventually hired David Kellogg to direct, best known for The Adventures of Seinfeld & Superman television commercials and the Vanilla Ice film, Cool as Ice (1991). Stan Winston was responsible for the practical, animatronic, and makeup effects for the film.

=== Casting ===
Cameron Diaz declined the role of Dr. Brenda Bradford in favor of Any Given Sunday.

=== Filming ===
Principal photography began on July 22, 1998, and wrapped on October 18.

=== Post-production ===
After a test screening, the film was cut to 78 minutes from the original 110-minute version.

=== The Gadgetmobile ===
The Gadgetmobile, designed by Brenda Bradford, is a white & chrome 1962 Lincoln Continental convertible instead of a Matra Murena/Toyota Supra hybrid from the cartoon. It cannot transform from a minivan to a police vehicle as in the cartoon either. It has an artificial intelligence with a male persona and can drive itself. Like most anthropomorphic cars, "his" front bumper is his mouth and he has eyes in his headlights. However, unlike those cars, who have two eyes, he has four. He also has a face on a computer screen on the dashboard and a license plate that reads "GADGET". Among other things, he can camouflage himself, has a radar system to track Gadget's location (and other people's as well), can extend his tires upwards, has retractable jail bars in his back seat (for transporting criminals), a vending machine (options on this include Skittles, M&M's, Surge, Sprite, Coca-Cola and McDonald's), police lights hidden in the hood that mechanically move onto the windshield, and a jet engine he keeps in his trunk. His artificial intelligence has a laid-back personality. The Gadgetmobile openly breaks the law constantly (he is a particular fan of backturns), but claims it is okay: "Speed limits are for cars, not the Gadgetmobile". Comedian D. L. Hughley provides his voice.

== Music ==
The soundtrack of the film, composed by John Debney, contains the singles "All Star" by Smash Mouth and "I'll Be Your Everything" by the boy band Youngstown.

== Home media ==
Inspector Gadget was released on VHS and DVD on December 7, 1999, and re-released on DVD on May 27, 2003, by Buena Vista Home Entertainment.

== Reception ==
=== Box office ===
The film had a gross of $134 million worldwide, against a budget of $90 million. It lost the studio approximately $30 million. In its opening weekend, the film grossed $21.9 million, finishing in second at the box office behind The Haunting ($33.4 million). In the United Kingdom, it grossed just over £7 million.

=== Critical response ===
On the review aggregator website Rotten Tomatoes, 20% of 64 critics' reviews are positive, with an average rating of 4.1/10. The website's consensus reads: "Despite an abundance of eyecandy, the film doesn't amount to much." Metacritic, which uses a weighted average, assigned the film a score of 36 out of 100, based on 22 critics, indicating "generally unfavorable" reviews. Audiences polled by CinemaScore gave the film an average grade of "B" on an A+ to F scale.

Lawrence Van Gelder of The New York Times stated that it "wastes a lot of good talent". In his review for the Chicago Sun-Times, Roger Ebert gave the film one-and-a-half stars out of four and mentioned that fans were angered when Dr. Claw reveals himself in the movie. Ian Freer of Empire magazine gave the film a two out of five stars.

Good notices included Susan Stark from The Detroit News, commenting that the film was "quick, mischievous, and full of visual trickery," but lacked magic. Bob Graham from the San Francisco Chronicle found the movie to be just as cartoonish and wondrous as Disney's Tarzan.

At the 1999 Stinkers Bad Movie Awards, the film received five nominations: Worst Picture, Worst Director (Kellogg), Most Painfully Unfunny Comedy, Worst Resurrection of a TV Show, and Least "Special" Special Effects.

== Franchise ==
=== Sequel ===
Inspector Gadget 2 is a 2003 made-for-video sequel to Inspector Gadget, with French Stewart taking over the title role. It follows Gadget getting a replacement named G2 (Elaine Hendrix) who is a woman-like version of Gadget. Meanwhile, Dr. Claw gets out of prison and plans to steal gold from the United States Treasury, so it is up to Gadget, Penny, Brain and G2 to stop Claw's plans.

The sequel drew more from its source material than the original film and also experienced a slightly improved critical reception, earning a 40% rating on Rotten Tomatoes based on 5 reviews. The film was released on March 11, 2003.

=== Reboot ===
In May 2015, a new film with a live-action version of the character was in development, with Dan Lin as producer. In October 2019, Mikey Day and Streeter Seidell were hired to write the film.
