= Come Clean (Hilary Duff song) =

2004 single by Hilary Duff

Single by Hilary Duff

from the album Metamorphosis
- B-side: "Why Not"
- Released: January 12, 2004
- Recorded: 2003
- Genre: Pop rock
- Length: 3:34
- Label: Buena Vista; Hollywood
- Songwriters: Kara DioGuardi; John Shanks
- Producer: John Shanks

Hilary Duff singles chronology
"So Yesterday" (2003)	"Come Clean" (2004)	"Little Voice" (2004)

Audio video
- "Come Clean" on YouTube

"Come Clean" is a song by American actress and singer Hilary Duff from her second studio album, Metamorphosis (2003). Released as the second single from Metamorphosis, the song was written by Kara DioGuardi and John Shanks, while production was handled by Shanks. It is a midtempo pop rock song with electronica and techno influences. Lyrically, "Come Clean" is about letting go of a strained relationship and wanting a fresh start. It uses the metaphor of rain washing away pretense to find honesty and emotional clarity. The song was sent to contemporary hit radio in the United States on January 12, 2004, by Buena Vista and Hollywood Records.

Upon its release, "Come Clean" received generally favorable reviews from music critics, who praised the song's production and lyrical content. It was a commercial success worldwide, reaching number seven in Canada, number nine in the Netherlands, number 17 in Australia, and number 18 in the United Kingdom, as well as peaking within the top 20 in Ireland, New Zealand, and Spain. In the United States, "Come Clean" reached number 35, becoming Duff's first top-40 single on the Billboard Hot 100. The song would later go on to become Duff's best-selling single in the United States.

The accompanying music video for "Come Clean" was directed by Dave Meyers and shows Duff inside a house on a rainy day, waiting for her love interest. It was nominated in the category of Best Pop Video at the 2004 MTV Video Music Awards. The song was used in the theatrical trailer for the 2004 film A Cinderella Story, which stars Duff. It was used as the theme song for the MTV reality television shows Laguna Beach: The Real Orange County and Newport Harbor: The Real Orange County, and the song is included on the soundtrack album for Laguna Beach. A remix of "Come Clean" by DJ Chris Cox was included on Duff's first compilation album, Most Wanted (2005); this version was also included on Duff's Dignity Walmart edition Remix EP as the dance mix in 2007. Another remix of the song by Chico Bennett and Richard "Humpty" Vission was included on Duff's third compilation album, Best of Hilary Duff (2008). A re-recorded version of "Come Clean" was released on April 10, 2026.

== Background and release ==
Work on Hilary Duff's first high-profile album (following her Christmas debut record in 2002) started concurrently with the shooting of the films The Lizzie McGuire Movie and Cheaper by the Dozen. Duff, the executive producer Andre Recke, and her mother Susan Duff, enlisted her to work with songwriters and producers such as Kara DioGuardi, The Matrix, Charlie Midnight, and John Shanks. Duff commented on the process, claiming, "Here were the very best writers, musicians, and producers ever and they were so open to my opinions. I got to talk with some of the writers and say, ‘You know, I feel like this’ and they got it. It is so cool. I loved the whole process." The project would lean into pop rock songs, with pop influences as well.

As DioGuardi recalled, she had written a song called "Come Clean" with John Shanks, which in her own words, "was sort of this personal statement for me", since she felt uninspired after working on Marc Anthony's 2002 album, Mended. She continued: "I felt like it was very binding. The melodies had to be within the constraints of what was going on in the tracks. So 'Come Clean' was kind of this statement for me, as I’m getting away from all of that, I’m going to go back to the way it should be done in music. The song changed because she was young. I think the line originally was 'wet my dreams' [and became] 'wake my dreams'." In November 2003, MTV News announced that "Come Clean" was set to be released as the album's second single in January 2004. It was immediately released to US mainstream radio on January 12, 2004.

A re-recorded version of the song was originally released as a bonus track on select editions of Duff's sixth studio album Luck... or Something, but was later released to digital download and streaming platforms on April 10, 2026. This version was featured in promotional material for the Laguna Beach: The Real Orange County reunion special.. Additionally, it was included on Duff's third extended play (Mine), which was released to streaming and digital download platforms on May 29, 2026.

== Composition ==
"Come Clean"
The chorus of the song, backed by drums. It also incorporates elements of electronic music.

"Come Clean" was written and produced by Kara DioGuardi with songwriter John Shanks. Although written from DioGuardi's point of view, it was "adapted for Duff and fit the singer’s goal of sharing who she really was." It is a pop song with a "hypnotic synth pattern" and a "driving tempo". Musically, "Come Clean" is a moderately fast song in a tempo of 120 beats per minute. Written in the key of B major, it features the sequence of G♯mj7—E2 as its chord progression. Duff's vocals span from the note of F♯3 to the note of B4 As noted by Billboard writer Chuck Taylor and MTV News editor Joe D'Angelo, it is less "bratty" and "clichéd" than Duff's previous single, "So Yesterday" (2003). Duff agreed, citing the song as her favorite on Metamorphosis, saying it is "a little more mellow" than "So Yesterday", "but it's not really pop. It sounds sort of like techno, but it's slow. It's really cool."

Lyrically, the song talks about looking at a situation carefully to fully understand what's at the heart of the matter. In it, she also sings about requiring honesty and transparency in a relationship. D'Angelo noted that "it's her emotional portrayal that has matured in line with the song's reflective theme," with Duff singing at one point, "I'm shedding every color/ Trying to find a pigment of truth/ Beneath my skin," before launching into the chorus of "Let the rain fall down/I'm coming clean." Some critics noted that it features "angst-ridden lyrics like "let it wash away my sanity, 'cause I wanna feel the thunder, I wanna scream"." In a 2005 interview with News Times, Duff said that the song is "obviously about a boy and a girl's relationship and it's just talking about how somebody thinks they're in the dark. She's tired of it and he's tired of it and they're coming clean, whether it means they're gonna be together or not. They're laying all the cards out on the table and coming out with everything that hasn't been said basically".

== Chart performance ==
The song debuted on the Billboard Hot 100 chart of February 28, 2004, at number 53, and eventually peaked at number 35, becoming Duff's first top 40 song in the United States. As of July 27, 2014, the song had sold 655,000 digital copies in the United States and has been certified platinum by the Recording Industry Association of America for equivalent sales of 1,000,000 units.

== Music video ==
=== Development and release ===
The single's music video was directed by Dave Meyers and filmed in Los Angeles on November 23, 2003. Meyers said of the video, "I'm trying to do something where you're taking her [Duff] very seriously ... very dramatic and very feminine, and sort of almost sensual. I don't think we've ever seen that from her. She's been a bit of a pop icon, so I'm just trying to give her a bit more credibility on an artist front."

In the United States, the video premiered on January 11, 2004, during Nickelodeon's TEENick block. The next day, it made its debut on MTV during an episode of Making the Video before premiering on Total Request Live two days later. It entered the show's top ten video countdown the following day at number eight, and spent twenty-five days on the countdown, peaking at number three. It also reached the top 5 of TRL UK. The video was nominated in the category of Best Pop Video at the 2004 MTV Video Music Awards.

=== Synopsis ===
In the video, Duff is shown in her house during a rainy day (reflecting the rain reference in the chorus of the song), walking from room to room. Her friends arrive and watch television with her in the living room. The rainstorm intensifies over the course of the day, as right before the bridge, the power in her house goes out. The interior scenes are intercut with shots of Duff's boyfriend (played by Gavin Beasley) driving to her house in a car. At the end of the video, the boyfriend arrives at the house, and Duff ventures out into the rain to meet him; they kiss as the video ends.

According to Meyers, "We never do know if the guy in the end is a boyfriend or friend or what the drama is. It's just all very photogenic and sophisticated and not too colorful." Duff said that the video "really shows that she's kind of in this monotone mood throughout the whole thing. She doesn't show too much emotion except that she's waiting for this boy, this guy, to come. You can't tell when they're running toward each other if they're gonna kiss or they're gonna hug or they're gonna hit each other. It's a bunch of different emotions."

== Track listing and formats ==
"Come Clean" – Australian maxi single
No.	Title	Length
1.	"Come Clean" (Radio mix)	3:26
2.	"Come Clean" (Rhythmic mix)	3:32
3.	"Come Clean" (Acoustic version)	3:22
4.	"Hilary Speaks" (Exclusive Australian Interview)	6:13
5.	"Come Clean" (Music video)	3:26
Total length:		13:46

"Come Clean" – Canadian CD single
No.	Title	Length
1.	"Come Clean" (Radio mix)	3:26
2.	"Come Clean" (Rhythmic mix)	3:33
Total length:		7:08

"Come Clean" – UK CD single 1
No.	Title	Length
1.	"Come Clean"	3:35
2.	"Why Not"	2:59
3.	"Come Clean" (Music video)	3:33
Total length:		10:07

"Come Clean" – UK CD single 2
No.	Title	Length
1.	"Come Clean"	3:35
2.	"Come Clean" (Joe Bermudez & Josh Harris Main Mix)	3:35
3.	"Come Clean" (Cut to the Chase Club Mix — Radio Edit)	3:29
4.	"Come Clean" (Music video)	3:33
Total length:		13:32

"Come Clean" – UK The Remixes EP
No.	Title	Length
1.	"Come Clean" (Cut to the Chase Club Mix — Radio Edit)	3:29
2.	"Come Clean" (Flood Remix Radio)	3:44
3.	"Come Clean" (Joe Bermudez & Josh Harris Main Mix)	3:35
4.	"Come Clean" (Cut to the Chase Club Extended Club Mix)	5:31
5.	"Come Clean" (Chris Cox Flood Remix)	9:42
Total length:		25:21

== Personnel ==
Adapted from the liner notes

- John Shanks – producer
- Rob Chiarelli – recording, mixing

== Charts ==
=== Weekly charts ===
Chart (2004)	Peak position
Australia (ARIA)	17
Belgium (Ultratop 50 Flanders)	33
Belgium (Ultratip Bubbling Under Wallonia)	2
Canada (Nielsen SoundScan)	7
France (SNEP)	29
Ireland (IRMA)	16
Netherlands (Dutch Top 40)	8
Netherlands (Single Top 100)	9
New Zealand (Recorded Music NZ)	17
Romania (Romanian Top 100)	98
Scottish Singles Sales (Official Charts)	12
Spain (Promusicae)	12
Switzerland (Schweizer Hitparade)	78
UK Singles (Official Charts)	18
US Billboard Hot 100	35
US Adult Pop Airplay (Billboard)	37
US Pop Airplay (Billboard)	9

=== Year-end charts ===
Chart (2004)	Rank position
Netherlands (Dutch Top 40)	80
Netherlands (Single Top 100)	65
US Mainstream Top 40 (Billboard)	53

== Certifications and sales ==
Region	Certification	Certified units/sales
United States (RIAA)	Platinum	1,000,000^{‡}
^{‡} Sales+streaming figures based on certification alone.

== Release history ==
Region	Date	Format(s)	Label(s)	Ref.
United States	January 12, 2004	Mainstream radio	Buena Vista; Hollywood	
Australia	January 19, 2004	Maxi single	Buena Vista; Hollywood	
United Kingdom	April 12, 2004	CD single; maxi single	Buena Vista; Hollywood	
Germany	June 28, 2004	Maxi single	Buena Vista; Hollywood	
United States	October 19, 2004	Digital download	Buena Vista; Hollywood	
