= Metamorphosis (Hilary Duff album) =

2003 studio album by Hilary Duff

Studio album by Hilary Duff
- Released: August 26, 2003
- Recorded: January – June 6, 2003
- Studio: Hollywood Records Studio/Walt Disney (California)
- Genres: Pop rock; teen pop; bubblegum pop
- Length: 43:07
- Labels: Buena Vista; Hollywood
- Producers: The Matrix; John Shanks; Charlie Midnight; Charlton Pettus; Marc Swersky; Chico Bennett; Kara DioGuardi; Jim Marr; Wendy Page; Denny Weston Jr.; Meredith Brooks; Matthew Gerrard

Hilary Duff chronology
Santa Claus Lane (2002)	Metamorphosis (2003)	Hilary Duff (2004)

Alternative cover
- European and Australian edition cover

Singles from Metamorphosis
- 1. "So Yesterday" Released: July 15, 2003; 2. "Come Clean" Released: January 13, 2004; 3. "Little Voice" Released: May 9, 2004

Metamorphosis is the second studio album by American singer-songwriter Hilary Duff. The album was released on August 26, 2003, by Buena Vista Records and Hollywood Records as the follow-up to her Christmas album, Santa Claus Lane (2002). According to Duff, the album incorporates elements of pop and rock music, and it represents changes that are specific to her life and that everyone experiences. Duff worked with several producers on the album such as The Matrix. Others who collaborated on the album include Chico Bennett, Matthew Gerrard, John Shanks and Kara DioGuardi.

The album coincided with other high-profile projects in which she was involved in other media. Metamorphosis received mixed to negative reviews from music critics; some complimented it for being a modern-day bubblegum album, while others considered the album to be a promotional gimmick for Duff, lacking real substance. The album debuted at number two on the US Billboard 200, selling 203,000 copies in its first week. In the following week, the album rose to number one on the chart. It became the eighth best-selling album of 2003 in the US, according to Nielsen SoundScan, selling 2.6 million copies in a period of five months. By late 2005, the album had sold five million copies worldwide. Later the album was certified quadraple platinum by the Recording Industry Association of America (RIAA) for shipments of over four million copies in the United States. For Hollywood Records, Metamorphosis was the label's first high-seller in several years and led to the company's further successful cultivation of new artists and brands using the Disney Channel. She was the sixth solo artist to peak at number one on the Billboard 200 under the age of 18.

Three singles were released from the album. The lead single, "So Yesterday", was released in July 2003 to mixed reviews. The song only made a moderate impact in the United States, peaking in the top 50 at number 42 on the US Billboard Hot 100. Internationally, it peaked within the top-ten of the music charts in Australia, Canada, France and the UK Singles Chart. The second single, "Come Clean", released in early 2004, was more successful in the United States, peaking at number 35 on the US Billboard Hot 100 and becoming her best-selling single in the country. The third and final single from the album, "Little Voice", was only released internationally. Duff further promoted the album with the Metamorphosis Tour, which began in November 2003 and ended in May 2004.

== Background ==
Hilary Duff had always wanted to follow in the footsteps of her elder sister, Haylie Duff. Duff watched her sister rehearsing in 2001, after which she told her mother Susan Duff that she wanted to be involved in singing. During the same time period, she attended a Radio Disney concert where she met Andre Recke, whose client Myra was performing. According to Duff, watching the pop musicians preparing and warming up backstage at the concert made her think, "I want to do this so bad". Recke said he thought Duff, who was popular with preteens at the time because of her role in the popular Disney Channel original series Lizzie McGuire, had "something special ... Sometimes you just have that feeling, that, 'Wow, she's a star.'" After becoming determined to start a music career, Duff resumed her vocal lessons—which she had started before her acting career began—and became one of Recke's clients. "I've always had a big drive", she said. "When I felt like something looked fun or I wanted to accomplish something, I really just go for it ... I didn't really know what it was gonna be like, but I knew I wanted to try it and I knew that I could do it." Duff recorded several songs for Disney soundtrack and compilation albums, and a Christmas album, Santa Claus Lane, in 2002. Her songs "I Can't Wait", "Why Not" and "What Dreams Are Made Of" were hits on Radio Disney, but Recke and executives at Buena Vista Music Group envisioned Metamorphosis as a vehicle by which Duff could reach a more mature audience.

== Recording ==
Duff, her mother Susan, and Recke enlisted the songwriting and production team The Matrix—whom Recke had previously hired to write songs for Myra's 2001 eponymous debut album—and songwriter Charlie Midnight, who had contributed to Santa Claus Lane (2002). According to Duff, her mother, Recke and Duff herself worked very hard to get music that she related to and was age-appropriate for her. Duff said that she did not want to make "a really poppy album" because that was not the type of music she listened to. The presence of The Matrix was noted because of their work on Avril Lavigne's highly successful debut album, Let Go (2002), but Duff said that she did not want to emulate other artists: "There are definitely people I respect and I love their music, but there was never really an artist that I said, 'I want to be just like them...' ... I wanted to be like myself".

According to Duff, although she did not write most of the songs, she collaborated on each of them. Aside from The Matrix and Charlie Midnight, contributions to the album came from singer-songwriter Meredith Brooks, Kara DioGuardi, Matthew Gerrard, John Shanks and Duff's sister, Haylie, who Duff said knows her better than "anyone else in the world". Duff discussed her feelings with some of the songwriters, and she praised them because they were open to her opinions and "really got it". She said that she would have liked more time to work with the songwriters and co-write more of her own material, saying "I feel like you need time to really get in touch with yourself to do that". In May 2004, Meredith Brooks, writer and producer of "Party Up", complained about the million-dollar budgets major labels spend to produce albums, saying "There's something seriously wrong with all that! You can't keep that going. Artists have to sell millions of records for anybody to make money off of those bloated budgets."

== Production ==
=== Influences and sound ===
As Duff was really into Destiny's Child at the time, initial work on the album carried a more "urban style" than the finished project. The work, according to Chico Bennett, "didn't strike a chord", so they went for a different approach. Recke asked Duff what type of music she would like to do, to which she responded: "Well, growing up, we listened to a lot of rock music, and I like a little bit more guitar in it." So they decided to go about the record with a "real band vibe". According to Recke, the album is still pop, but with a "little rockier edge to it". They wanted to do something that would fit Duff's personality and "something that she wanted to be". Recke made sure that the music was what Duff wanted, as there's "nothing worse than an artist not excited to perform it".

Recke, Landers and Duff wanted to make "not just a record that might appeal to an audience because of her television popularity", but they wanted to create a "really fun, great pop record that Hilary could get behind personally". According to Recke, the songs on the album were all "molded around" Duff. He cited this as the reason why the album "feels so authentic". According to Midnight, the album does not contain "just a bunch of different songs that don't have anything to do with the others. When you look at the overall roster of songs, they all do fit into a certain context." Of the process, Midnight explained:

Considering how young she was, I thought that was interesting, that it wouldn’t be a complete fabrication, because I’m used to working with very strong artists, strong personalities. After I got to know Hilary and we hung out, I saw that she had real points of view and was going to be real involved, which makes it easier to actually create the music—coming from somewhere, from a personality, from a point of view, rather than created out of whole cloth. So that excited me. Hilary had so much personality that she was able to convey on a recording.

=== Contributors ===
"I always chose my music, but not really being an artist yet, I wasn't a big writer. I didn't have a ton of ideas going into it. I think I was really in touch with the subject matter and content. I would change things here or there. Everybody loves to say they just cranked me out like I was just a product or whatever, but if there was some song that one of the A&R guys loved but I didn't love it, they didn't make me record it."

— Duff on the production process for Metamorphosis

As she was not familiar with the process of creating an album, Duff met with many different record producers. She sat down with each of them and told them what she enjoyed listening to. In some instances, Duff would go into detail about events in her personal life that could be used for inspiration in a song. While Recke and Landers were in charge of looking for the "right songs" for the album, Duff was also heavily involved in the song selection and in "making sure the lyrics were where she was at that age".

Kara DioGuardi, who had long outgrown Disney, thus making her unaware of who Duff was, was told by an acquaintance of hers who worked at EMI that she should meet up with Recke. DioGuardi told her friend that she was "on a tight schedule", but later decided that she'd "try it". During their initial meeting, DioGuardi played Recke several songs that she had written. After hearing the selection, he immediately told her that he wanted "Come Clean" and "Little Voice" for Duff, saying that they were perfect for her.

Having liked the chemistry between Charlie Midnight, Recke and Duff on Santa Claus Lane, Landers asked Midnight to provide material for Metamorphosis. He submitted "quite a few songs" for the album because he loved working with Duff. He concentrated on trying to "bounce things" off Recke, Landers and Duff about "what topics they thought would be right" for the album. Midnight was "pretty much ground zero" for a lot of people involved with Metamorphosis, according to Charlton Pettus; he was the lyricist who "seemed to get the tone of it all".

Pettus deemed his involved in the project as being "completely accidental"; he had just moved from New Jersey to Los Angeles and was introduced to Midnight through their mutual friend Marc Swersky. The three wrote several songs together with no particular artist in mind. One song in particular, "Workin' It Out", was given to Duff for Metamorphosis. Similarly, Midnight had written "Love Just Is" with Jim Marr and Wendy Page without "necessarily thinking of Hilary at first". After insisting that Duff should record it, Recke played the song for her and she "absolutely loved it".

The Matrix, a record production team consisting of Lauren Christy, Graham Edwards and Scott Spock had "just come off the back of a very successful little run" with three number one hits with Avril Lavigne when Disney approached them and asked if they would be interested in writing for Duff. They agreed and called Midnight, who had already been involved in the project. Christy cited him as one of her favorite writers and her mentor. Being familiar with their work, meeting with The Matrix was "very exciting" for Duff. Upon hearing the demos for "So Yesterday", "Where Did I Go Right?" and "The Math" – performed by Christy – Hollywood Records "immediately loved them".

=== Writing ===
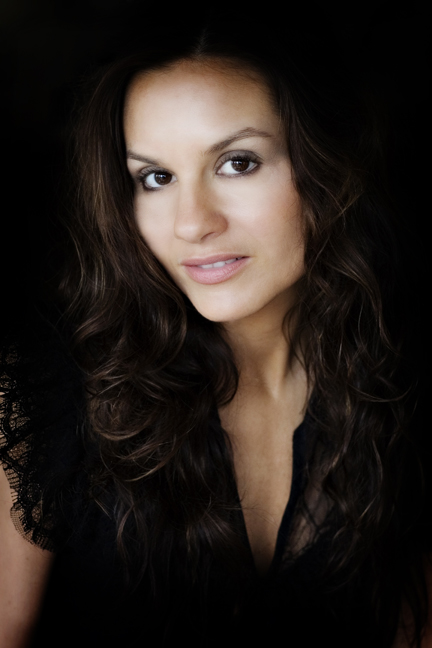
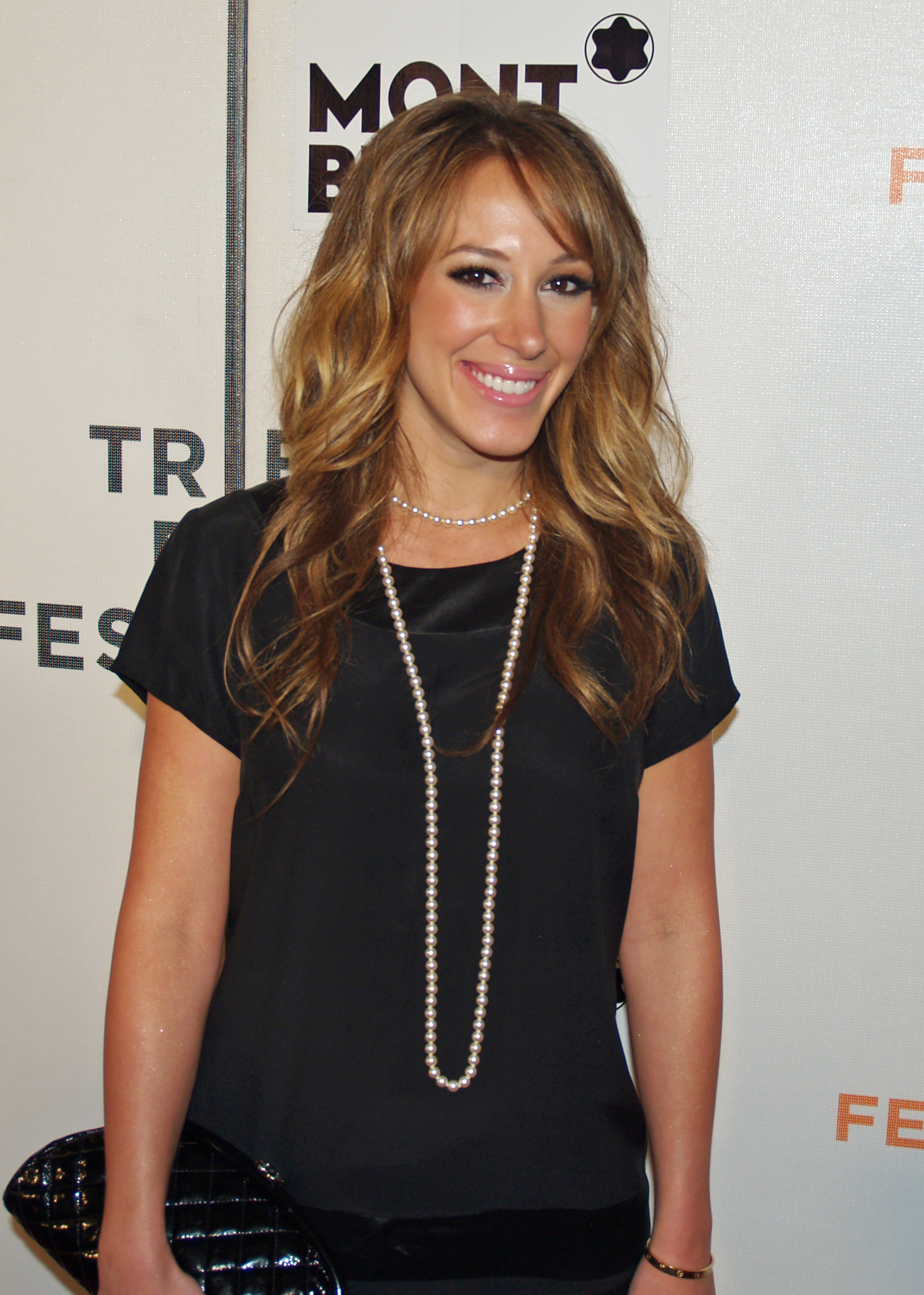
During the production of Metamorphosis, Duff's life had been changing "so fast and so quickly". Songwriter Kara DioGuardi (left) helped Duff find her "voice", while her sister Haylie (right) acted as a "specific comfort place".

DioGuardi wrote "Come Clean" with John Shanks as a "personal statement" to herself. At the time, she had just finished work on Marc Anthony's sixth studio album, Mended (2002), and was "really, really uninspired writing to tracks". DioGuardi felt as if it was "very binding", as "the melodies had to be within the constraints of what was going on in the tracks". According to DioGuardi, the song was "kind of this statement for [herself]", as she was "getting away from all of that" and "going to go back to the way it should be done in music". "Little Voice" was written by DioGuardi and Patrik Berger for Swedish singer Sahlene.

After Recke chose the songs, DioGuardi had the task of rewriting some of the song's lyrics to make them more appropriate for Duff's demographic. According to Recke: "Kara got [it]. It morphed into this really cool creative relationship that Hilary and Kara developed. What I always loved about Kara was she wrote like an artist, not as a typical songwriter. I think that's what really connected with Hilary." Duff herself credits DioGuardi as helping her find her "voice".

Duff loved the recording process of "Come Clean", having a "good time" in the studio with Shanks, who produced the song. According to Duff, he was "really, really, really great" about making her feel comfortable in the studio. DioGuardi's idea for the vocals on "Little Voice" were "very, very character—it was one of those songs that's more about the character of the vocal as opposed to being a more straight-to-the-middle kind of vocal performance". According to Bennett, the song's producer, "it was kind of an acting job as opposed to a more traditional approach" for Duff.

"Inner Strength" was an "awesome experience" for Duff, as it was the first time that she and her sister Haylie wrote together. Writing with Haylie was a "specific comfort place" for her at the time, as her life had been changing "so fast and so quickly". According to Duff, "it was kind of scary and a lot of times I felt alone or criticized". Haylie used to write a lot of poetry and when she was 16 she wrote a poem about sweet sixteen. She read it for my family and Duff suggested that they make it into a song, which became "Sweet Sixteen".

Christy found writing the songs for Duff as "really fun and easy". The Matrix had just completed their work with Avril Lavigne on her debut studio album, Let Go (2002) at the time, so they were "in that zone". The Matrix knew that they had a hit on their hands as soon as they began working on "So Yesterday". When Duff heard the song for the first time, she was very unsure about it. Despite her reluctance to do the song, she recorded it and once Hollywood Records heard it, "everybody started sort of freaking out". She later recalled, in August 2013, that it was not one of her favorite songs, but that it "definitely grew on [her]". Christy recalled the process of working with Duff as being "too easy". She cited Duff as "just a professional" and that the one thing that she remembers the most from working on Metamorphosis was that Duff is a "real worker". According to Christy, "Where Did I Go Right?" and "So Yesterday" are among her favorite songs that she has ever written.

As she had already worked with Midnight in the past, he already knew what "she wanted to talk about and what she was going through at that time". For "Metamorphosis", Bennett, Midnight and Duff had discussions about "all these changes that were going on" in her life. Bennett wrote the track and then got together with Midnight to compose the lyrics and the melody. Duff had only a couple of days to record the vocals for "Metamorphosis", as she was also working on a film at the time. As Bennett was putting the song together he realized that he had a "different spin on the melody", so Duff went back into the studio to "lay down a different melody" for the chorus at the last minute. Duff's "really strong work ethic" greatly impressed Bennett.

== Composition ==
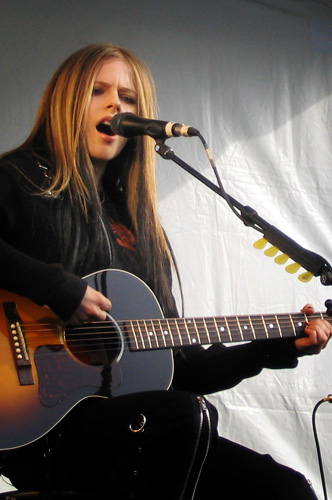
The Matrix worked on the album, causing critics to compare it to the music of Avril Lavigne (pictured).

Duff described the album as "pop music [that] has some more rock and edginess to it"; she said the type of music was "somewhere in between" pop and "hardcore rock", but that she did not know how to explain it. According to her, there is "a lot of different music" on Metamorphosis that she finds difficult to categorize. The music on the album is "a little different" from her previous music because, according to her, the album "has all the kinds of music I like to listen to". She said that there are many "different sounds" on the album, such as rock and electronic, and "a whole range" of tempos, including "deep, slow" tracks and "high-energy" songs to provide her with a "boost". According to Duff, everyone experiences varied feelings and moods, and they can "feel a bit better" by playing their favorite song.

Rolling Stone magazine described the album as "a slick collection of pop songs, master-crafted to appeal to huge numbers of young people". Duff told the Chicago Sun-Times in 2005 she was under the control of the record label during the making of Metamorphosis and her third album, Hilary Duff (2004), and could not incorporate the sound she wanted into her recordings. She said the production "[had] been mastered and sounds really pretty ... If I could change it, I would, and it would sound [less pop]. My name is Hilary Duff, and I don't know why I don't get to make Hilary Duff music."

Duff said the album represented "kind of a change" because it was "kind of different" from anything she had previously done; as she put it, "We called the album Metamorphosis because it's about changes that everybody experiences". Duff called change "a very important and natural thing", saying that the album was a good way to introduce everyone to "the real me" because, in her words, "Everyone evolves and changes". She said she was "excited" about Metamorphosis because it represented her rather than characters she played: "It's more personal than acting", she said; however, she said that the album was "not just about me". Duff said she believed her music provided a way for people to get to disassociate her from her Lizzie McGuire persona, a goal she said was "so important to me". She described it as "definitely stuff that everybody my age can relate to". She characterized the recording process as "cool" because the songs are strongly related to her personal life.

The album opens with its lead single "So Yesterday," that according to Duff is an empowering song about breaking up with someone and getting over it. The song, that incorporates elements of pop and rock music, was cited as having influences of Avril Lavigne. The second song on the album, and second single, "Come Clean" documents a relationship between a boy and a girl who feel they are "in the dark" about each other; in Duff's words: "they're coming clean, whether it means they're gonna be together or not." "Little Voice," a cover of the 2000 single "The Little Voice" by Swedish recording artist Sahlene, is the album's third single. The song speaks of having a conversation with ones conscience. "Sweet Sixteen" is a song by Haylie Duff described as being "a really fun song that totally relates to [her] life right now." The album's title track "Metamorphosis" is a song about "getting over a boy." Duff insisted the song was not about fellow singer and ex-boyfriend Aaron Carter, with whom she was rumored to have broken up after a fight. "Inner Strength," another contribution of Haylie Duff, is described by as "very empowering and uplifting" and "really beautiful". The final song on the album, "Why Not," was previously released on the soundtrack for The Lizzie McGuire Movie, a film in which Duff starred.

== Release and promotion ==
Metamorphosis was released in North America on August 26, 2003. Its CD+DVD deluxe editions were released in Japan and Australia in 2004. During the period in which Metamorphosis was released, Duff was participating in many projects in film, brand licensing, music and television; USA Today wrote in July 2003 that she was emerging as "The Next Big Thing" and "a marketing powerhouse" with nine to twelve year-olds, and Billboard magazine said that she "is looking to become more than just the nation's next teen pop princess. She wants to become a brand-name phenomenon ... [Metamorphosis] is just the beginning." These projects included the high-profile Hollywood films Cheaper by the Dozen (2003) and A Cinderella Story (2004), a clothing and accessories line called Stuff by Hilary Duff, a Lizzie McGuire merchandise line, and a Visa prepaid credit card for children aged six to thirteen. She also participated in a marketing campaign for the Hasbro personal video player VideoNow, for which she filmed the video A Day in the Life of Hilary Duff, which included a behind-the-scenes look at the making of the "Why Not" music video. Entertainment lawyer Larry Golring called it "a great cross-promotion" for VideoNow and Duff's music career, which he said were "two new brands that are going to be huge this time next year, and they hopefully will have helped each other get there". The Associated Press quoted Bob Cavallo, the chairman of Buena Vista Music Group, as saying that "At this point, she's obviously already a franchise".

Marketing people such as Laura Groppe, president of Girls Intelligence Agency, said that the timing of the release of Metamorphosis and other Duff-related products was right because there had been a lack of teen idols since Britney Spears, and that Duff "[is] not too pretty. Not too thin. Not too anything ... like a little Meg Ryan." According to Marketing Evaluations/TvQ, Duff was, in July 2003, the female star most popular with kids aged between six and eleven. Amy Doyle, at MTV's vice president of music programming, said Duff was "definitely one of the hot people to watch ... She's become the fabric of pop culture with teens right now." There was concern from some, however, that Duff could become overexposed, although Duff's manager emphasized his selectiveness against "[i]f something looks cheesy", and that Duff "doesn't want to be all over TV commercials". Others, such as Robert Thorne, the CEO of the Olsen twins' Dualstar Entertainment, said that Duff should have stayed with The Walt Disney Company — from which she separated after contract negotiations broke down — to build the Lizzie McGuire franchise and use it to help develop her career into adulthood. In spite of this split, the profile of Duff and the album was supported by the DVD release of The Lizzie McGuire Movie and reruns of Lizzie McGuire episodes on the Disney Channel for two seasons. Duff herself said that Lizzie McGuire was "a great place to begin my career", but said that "it's exciting to go out on my own" with Metamorphosis.

Before the release of the album, and beginning in July 2003, Duff and Metamorphosis were given substantial promotional support from MTV, which highlighted "So Yesterday" on Making the Video and Total Request Live; Duff co-hosted the special TRL's All-Star Backyard BBQ. "So Yesterday" was released to US Top 40 radio in mid-July, after which it became the "most added" song on the format. On the internet AOL Music had a marketing relationship with Duff and Metamorphosis: it hosted the premiere of "So Yesterday" and recording a Sessions@AOL broadcast with her, among other content exclusive to AOL members. In late September The WB Television Network aired an hour-long Hilary Duff birthday special, and MTV aired an episode of the documentary series Diary that followed Duff through a day. A DVD containing music videos, performance and behind-the-scenes footage and bonus features, Hilary Duff: All Access Pass, was released in November.

Duff embarked on a four-week concert tour in the US from November to early December 2003. The song "Anywhere But Here" was included on the soundtrack of the film A Cinderella Story; Duff promoted the film and Metamorphosis with a series of television appearances in July 2004, including one on ABC's Good Morning America. She performed before roughly 7,000 people, breaking a Good Morning America audience record. In the same period she embarked on a US summer tour, during which she performed a one-hour set that included Metamorphosis tracks, covers of The Go-Go's' "Our Lips Are Sealed" and The Who's "My Generation", and previously unheard material from Hilary Duff. Haylie Duff was the opening act on the tour, which ran for thirty-six dates and sold well in major arenas; Pollstar editor-in-chief said that there was "a real positive buzz about ticket sales for Hilary's show". The tour was involved with the charity Kids with a Cause, of which Duff was a charter member in 1999; it sponsored a "Food for a Friend" drive and encouraged attendees to bring canned food to each tour venue, where the cans were collected and distributed across shelters in each city through which Duff toured. By early August 2004, enough food had been amassed to feed more than 12,000 children. The success of the tour was credited with helping keep the teen pop market alive in the tour circuit, and for being one of the "bright spots" in a slow concert season.

=== Singles ===
"So Yesterday" was released as the lead single from the album on July 29, 2003. The song, written by Lauren Christy, Scott Spock, Graham Edwards and Charlie Midnight, was produced by production team The Matrix, who were notable at the time for their work with Avril Lavigne. Thus, some similarities arose between the song and the work of Lavigne. "So Yesterday" debuted on the Billboard Hot 100 chart at number fifty-three in the thirty-third week of 2003, and peaked at number forty-two in its eleventh week. It spent twenty weeks on the Hot 100. The song topped the US Billboard Hot 100 Singles Sales chart, making Duff the first artist in four months not affiliated with American Idol, to top the chart. The song peaked at number two in Canadian Singles Chart. In Australia the song debuted at number thirty-nine, peaked at number eight in its eighth week, and remained on the chart for twenty weeks. It was the forty-ninth best selling single of 2003 in Australia, and was certified platinum in 2004. In Japan, the song reached number 199 on the Oricon weekly charts. In United Kingdom, the song debuted at number nine on the UK Singles Chart. The song peaked in the top ten on the charts in other European countries such as the Netherlands and France. The Chris Applebaum-directed music video for the song premiered on MTV on July 24, 2003. It was later featured on MTV's Making the Video two days after the video's premiere on July 26, 2003. The video shows Duff playing a breakup prank on her aloof boyfriend.

"Come Clean" was released as the second single from the album on January 13, 2004. Duff described the song as being "obviously about a boy and a girl's relationship and it's just talking about how somebody thinks they're in the dark." "She's tired of it and he's tired of it and they're coming clean, whether it means they're gonna be together or not. They're laying all the cards out on the table and coming out with everything that hasn't been said basically.", she said. Duff cited the song as her favorite on Metamorphosis, saying it is "a little more mellow" than her previous single, "So Yesterday", "but it's not really pop. It sounds sort of like techno, but it's slow. It's really cool." The song peaked at number thirty five, becoming Duff's first top forty single in the US and also her highest charting single at the time. However, the song failed to match the success of its predecessor "So Yesterday" in many other countries. It reached a peak of number seventeen in Australia and eighteen in the UK, while charting inside top twenty in Canada, Netherlands, Ireland and New Zealand. The accompanying music video, directed by Dave Meyers, premiered on MTV's Total Request Live on January 14, 2004. The video showed Duff inside a house on a rainy day, waiting for her love interest. The video was nominated for Best Pop Video at the 2004 MTV Video Music Awards.

"Little Voice" was released as the third and final single from the album on June 15, 2004, only internationally. The song is a cover of the 2000 song "The Little Voice" by Swedish recording artist Sahlene, written by Kara DioGuardi and Patrik Berger. The new version by Duff featured slightly different lyrics and was produced by Chico Bennett and DioGuardi. The song peaked at number twenty-nine in Australia. The music video for the song is a live performance taken from The Girl Can Rock Tour DVD.

== Critical reception ==
Professional ratings
Review scores
Source	Rating
AllMusic	4/5 stars
IGN	6.3/10
New York Post	3/4 stars
Rolling Stone	3/5 stars
Slant Magazine	1.5/5 stars
UKMIX	3/5 stars
USA Today	1.5/4 stars

Bob Cavallo said he expected the album to sell "a couple of million [copies] ... [i]f the pixie dust flies the right way". Stephen Thomas Erlewine of AllMusic wrote the album, "is what teen pop should sound like in 2003... a very good modern bubblegum album"; he said that it was influenced by Avril Lavigne but that Duff "has a sweeter, more appealing voice than Avril, and the rest of the record follows her cheerful charisma, resulting in a charmingly effervescent listen". However, Slant magazine said that Duff "has decided to ride the Avril wave" and noted that, like Lavigne, Duff enlisted The Matrix to produce and write some of the tracks.

Blender magazine called it "a masterfully executed tour through contempo mall-pop, '80s new-wave bubblegum and girl-power affirmations". IGN rated Metamorphosis 6.3 out of 10, praising Duff's confident vocals and the album's polished, radio-friendly production, while noting its bubblegum-pop appeal and occasional rock influences. USA Today named it the tenth worst pop album of 2003, writing "Note to all young, modestly talented singers: Stay in school and you won't wind up on worst-of lists before you're old enough to vote." Allison Stewart of The Chicago Tribune described Metamorphosis as a "not unenjoyable" collection of upbeat pop songs, praising its perky, wholesome tone and noting that Duff is particularly convincing on its edgier tracks, where the Matrix successfully give her an Avril Lavigne-inspired sound.

=== Accolades ===
Metamorphosis was nominated at the Juno Awards of 2004 for International Album of the Year, but lost to 50 Cent's Get Rich or Die Tryin'. Duff won in the Best New Artist category at the 2004 World Music Awards and Favorite Female Artist at the 2004 Kids' Choice Awards, on top of that "Come Clean" was nominated for a MTV Video Music Award for Best Pop Video. Duff also won a TMF award for the "Fake ID Award" category.

== Commercial performance ==
The album debuted at number two on the US Billboard 200 (behind Mary J. Blige's Love & Life) with 203,000 copies sold in its first week of release. Despite a 30% sales drop in its second week, during which it sold 131,000 copies, Metamorphosis peaked at number one on the chart for that week. It was certified platinum by the RIAA in three months, and two times platinum by the end of the year. In late November/early December, after Duff had appeared at the Macy's Thanksgiving Day Parade and sneak previews of the film Cheaper by the Dozen were held in select cities, Metamorphosis returned to the top five on the albums chart with a 132% sales increase over the previous week with 224,000 copies. In the Christmas shopping week, when the album was at number six on the Billboard 200, it sold 275,000 copies. It was the eighth best selling album of 2003 according to Nielsen SoundScan, selling 2.6 million copies, and it was certified four times platinum in October 2023. By September 2004, the album had sold 3.4 million copies in the United States. In August 2005, the release month of Duff's compilation album, Most Wanted, the album re-entered the Billboard 200.

In Canada, the album reached the top spot in its first week of release. It was certified platinum four months after its release for sales of 100,000, and in December 2004 it was certified quadruple platinum for sales exceeding 500,000 copies. In Australia, the album was certified platinum for sales of 70,000; it was number seventy-four on the ARIA year-end chart. Metamorphosis debuted at number twenty-six in France, and peaked at number twenty-two a week later, remaining on the chart for thirty-nine weeks. As of July 27, 2014, the album has sold 3,961,000 million copies in the United States and more than 5 million copies worldwide. It is her best selling album to date.

== Legacy ==
Metamorphosis was credited with helping to significantly raise the industry and corporate profile and marketplace presence of Hollywood Records, which Geoff Mayfield, charts director and senior analyst for Billboard magazine, said "[have] had some top albums before with the Tarzan movie soundtrack in 2000, but not like this Hilary Duff album". The San Fernando Valley Business Journal wrote that the album was "giving Hollywood Records a needed shot in the arm" after a decline in CD sales during the previous two years had forced the label to reduce costs and alter its operation. Hilliard Lyons analyst Jeffrey Thomison said Metamorphosis was a reflection of Disney's ability to develop "great synergy between their cable, film and music segments", particularly after The Lizzie McGuire Movie indicated that Duff's television fanbase could be migrated to film. Geoff Mayfield said on the subject, "All things being equal, if this album were done by anybody else, it would not be a hit". Metamorphosis made Duff the first "breakout artist" for Hollywood Records in its ten-year history, and its success coincided with that of albums by other artists on the label, such as Rascal Flatts and Josh Kelley, and of soundtracks for films such as The Cheetah Girls, Freaky Friday and The Lizzie McGuire Movie. Later, partly as a result of Metamorphosis, Hollywood Records used the Disney Channel to launch brands such as High School Musical and Hannah Montana, and artists such as Aly & AJ, The Cheetah Girls, Hannah Montana star Miley Cyrus, Raven-Symoné, Vanessa Hudgens and Jesse McCartney.

Blender magazine wrote that the success of the album consolidated Duff's status as a "tween icon", and estimated that it had earned her US$5,000,000. Moreover, sales of Metamorphosis indicated that Duff's popularity with teenagers was rising — 70% of buyers were aged between thirteen and twenty-two, compared to the soundtrack for The Lizzie McGuire Movie, 70% of the buyers of which were below the age of thirteen. Bob Cavallo attributed the album's success to Duff's amassing of fans of the singers and former Disney "Mouseketeers" Britney Spears and Christina Aguilera.

== Track listing ==
Metamorphosis – Standard edition
No.	Title	Writer(s)	Producer(s)	Length
1.	"So Yesterday"	Charlie Midnight; Lauren Christy; Scott Spock; Graham Edwards	The Matrix	3:35
2.	"Come Clean"	Kara DioGuardi; John Shanks	Shanks	3:34
3.	"Workin' It Out"	Midnight; Charlton Pettus; Marc Swersky	Midnight; Pettus; Swersky	3:15
4.	"Little Voice"	DioGuardi; Patrik Berger	Chico Bennett; DioGuardi	3:03
5.	"Where Did I Go Right?"	Midnight; Christy; Spock; Edwards	The Matrix	3:51
6.	"Anywhere But Here"	Jim Marr; Wendy Page; Bennett	Bennett	3:32
7.	"The Math"	Midnight; Christy; Spock; Edwards	The Matrix	3:19
8.	"Love Just Is"	Midnight; Marr; Page	Midnight; Marr; Page	4:02
9.	"Sweet Sixteen"	Haylie Duff; Toran Caudell	Midnight; Denny Weston Jr.	3:07
10.	"Party Up"	Meredith Brooks; Taylor Rhodes; Ashley George	Brooks	3:51
11.	"Metamorphosis"	Hilary Duff; Midnight; Bennett; Andre Recke	Midnight; Bennett	3:28
12.	"Inner Strength"	Haylie Duff	Midnight; Weston	1:34
13.	"Why Not" (bonus track)	Midnight; Matthew Gerrard	Gerrard	2:59
Total length:				43:07

Metamorphosis – US Target edition, European and Latin American edition
No.	Title	Writer(s)	Producer(s)	Length
14.	"Girl Can Rock"	Midnight; Weston	Midnight; Weston	3:10
Total length:				46:17

Metamorphosis – Asian and Australian edition
No.	Title	Writer(s)	Producer(s)	Length
14.	"A Day in the Sun"	Midnight; Gerrard	Gerrard	3:24
Total length:				46:31

Metamorphosis – Japanese edition
No.	Title	Writer(s)	Producer(s)	Length
14.	"A Day in the Sun"	Midnight; Gerrard	Gerrard	3:24
15.	"Girl Can Rock"	Midnight; Weston	Midnight; Weston	3:10
Total length:				49:41

Metamorphosis – Japanese deluxe edition
No.	Title	Writer(s)	Producer(s)	Length
16.	"So Yesterday" (Thunderpuss Remix)	Christy; Spock; Edwards; Midnight	The Matrix; Thunderpuss^{[a]}	4:17
17.	"Come Clean" (Radio Mix)	DioGuardi; Shanks	Shanks	3:25
Total length:				57:23

Metamorphosis – Australian deluxe edition DVD
No.	Title	Director(s)	Length
1.	"So Yesterday"	Chris Applebaum
2.	"Why Not"	Elliott Lester
3.	"Come Clean"	Dave Meyers
4.	"Anywhere But Here"

Metamorphosis – Japanese deluxe edition DVD
No.	Title	Length
1.	"So Yesterday"
2.	"Why Not"
3.	"I Can't Wait"
4.	"Acoustic Song Performances from Sessions@AOL"
5.	"Making of 'So Yesterday', The Video"
6.	"Making of 'Why Not', The Video"
7.	"Making of Sessions@AOL"
8.	"Making of Metamorphosis, The Album"
9.	"In the Recording Studio: 'Anywhere But Here', 'Love Just Is'"
10.	"Hilary Duff Photo Gallery and Home Movies"
11.	"Biography"
12.	"Making of 'Japan Promotion Tour'"
13.	"Hilary Duff EPK" (Japan version)
14.	"Metamorphosis TV-CM 15sec" (Japan version)
15.	"Metamorphosis TV-CM 30sec" (Japan version)
16.	"Metamorphosis TV-CM 15sec Version 2" (Japan version)

Metamorphosis Remixes track listing
No.	Title	Writer(s)	Producer(s)	Length
1.	"So Yesterday" (Remix)	Christy; Spock; Edwards; Midnight	The Matrix; Joe Bermudez^{[a]}	3:41
2.	"Party Up" (Remix)	Brooks; Rhodes; Hamilton	Brooks; Rob Chiarelli^{[a]}	3:43
3.	"Why Not" (Remix)	Midnight; Gerrard	Gerrard; Bennett^{[a]}	2:53
4.	"Sweet Sixteen"	Haylie Duff; Caudell	Weston, Jr.; Midnight	3:07
Total length:				13:21

Notes:

- ^{^[a]} signifies a remixer.
- The version of "Why Not" included on Metamorphosis is an alternate version with different lyrics in the first verse.
- Some digital releases of Metamorphosis do not include "Why Not".

== Credits and personnel ==
Credits for Metamorphosis adapted from AllMusic.

- Chico Bennett — composer, producer
- Meredith Brooks — producer
- Rob Chiarelli — mixing
- Lauren Christy — composer
- Savina Ciaramella — A&R
- Kara DioGuardi — producer
- Hilary Duff — composer
- Graham Edwards — composer
- Matthew Gerrard — composer
- Martin Häusler — art direction, design
- Jay Landers — executive producer
- Stephen Marcussen — mastering
- Dani Markman — A&R
- Jim Marr — producer
- The Matrix — arranger, engineer, mixing, producer
- Charlie Midnight — composer, producer
- Keith Munyan — photography
- Sheryl Nields — photography
- Wendy Page — composer, producer
- Charlton Pettus — composer
- Andre Recke — executive producer
- Jeff Rothschild — engineer
- John Shanks — producer
- Joel Soyffer — mixing
- Scott Spock — composer
- Steve Sterling — layout design
- Marc Swersky — composer
- Denny Weston Jr. — producer

=== Metamorphosis Remixes personnel ===
Credits for Metamorphosis Remixes adapted from liner notes.

- Andre Recke — executive producer
- Charlie Midnight — composer, producer
- Chico Bennett — remix
- Denny Weston, Jr. — producer
- Graham Edwards — composer
- Haylie Duff — composer
- Jay Landers — executive producer
- Joel Soyffer — mixing
- Joe Bermudez — remix
- Lauren Christy — composer
- Matthew Gerrard — composer, producer
- The Matrix — arranger, engineer, mixing, producer
- Meredith Brooks — producer
- Rob Chiarelli — remix
- Scott Spock — composer
- Steve Sterling — album design
- T.L. Rhodes — composer
- Toran Caudell — composer

== Charts ==
=== Weekly charts ===
Chart (2003–04)	Peak position
Argentine Albums (CAPIF)	4
Australian Albums (ARIA)	19
Belgian Albums (Ultratop Flanders)	20
Belgian Albums (Ultratop Wallonia)	50
Canadian Albums (Billboard)	1
Dutch Albums (Album Top 100)	23
French Albums (SNEP)	22
Irish Albums (IRMA)	41
Japanese Albums (Oricon)	9
New Zealand Albums (RMNZ)	20
Scottish Albums (Official Charts)	57
UK Albums (Official Charts)	69
US Billboard 200	1

Chart (2006)	Peak position
US Top Catalog Albums (Billboard)	35

=== Year-end charts ===
Chart (2003)	Position
Australian Albums (ARIA)	74
US Billboard 200	51
Worldwide Albums (IFPI)	43

Chart (2004)	Position
Australian Albums (ARIA)	67
Belgian Albums (Ultratop Flanders)	84
Dutch Albums (Album Top 100)	93
US Billboard 200	17

=== Decade-end charts ===
Chart (2000–09)	Position
US Billboard 200	80

== Certifications ==
Region	Certification	Certified units/sales
Argentina (CAPIF)	Gold	20,000^{^}
Australia (ARIA)	Platinum	70,000^{^}
Canada (Music Canada)	4× Platinum	400,000^{^}
Japan (RIAJ)	Gold	100,000^{^}
Mexico (AMPROFON)	Gold	50,000^{^}
South Korea	—	14,822
United States (RIAA)	4× Platinum	4,000,000^{‡}
^{^} Shipments figures based on certification alone.^{‡} Sales+streaming figures based on certification alone.

== Release history ==
Release dates and formats for Metamorphosis
Region	Date	Format	Label	Ref.
Canada	August 26, 2003	CD	Universal	
United States	August 26, 2003	CD	Buena Vista; Hollywood	
Australia	September 22, 2003	CD	Festival Mushroom	
Japan	November 6, 2003	CD	Avex Trax	
Germany	December 1, 2003	CD	Warner	
Japan	February 4, 2004	CD+DVD	Avex Trax	
Japan	March 28, 2007	CD	Avex Trax	
United States	June 11, 2021	LP	Walt Disney	
