= Youngstown (band) =

American band

- Origin: Youngstown, Ohio, U.S.
- Genres: Pop, R&B, ballad, contemporary R&B
- Years active: 1998–2005
- Label: Hollywood Records
- Past members: David "DC" Yeager; James Lee Dallas; Samuel "Sammy" Lopez Jr

Youngstown was an American boy band from Youngstown, Ohio, formed in 1998 and composed of David "DC" Yeager, Samuel "Sammy" Lopez Jr and James L. Dallas. They are best known for their 1999 single "I'll Be Your Everything", which peaked at number 71 on the Billboard Hot 100 and was the theme song for the Walt Disney Pictures film Inspector Gadget.

== History ==
The band's first single, "I'll Be Your Everything", featured on the film soundtrack for Inspector Gadget and on their debut album Let's Roll. In February 2000, Disney Channel aired Steps and Youngstown In Concert, a concert special featuring Youngstown and another group, Steps.

Their second album, Down For the Get Down, was released in 2001, and yielded the No. 21 Hot Singles Sales US hit "Sugar". Both albums were released through Hollywood Records. "Could You Love Me", the second album track was recorded later by Nick Lachey on his first album, SoulO. Another of their songs, "Away With The Summer Days", is on the first Princess Diaries soundtrack.

In 2005, the band dissolved.

== Members ==
- David "DC" Yeager
- James Lee Dallas
- Samuel "Sammy" Lopez Jr

== Discography ==
=== Albums ===
- Let's Roll (September 28, 1999)
- Down for the Get Down (August 7, 2001)

=== Other albums ===
- Music for Pokémon: The Movie 2000 (with Nobody's Angel), Released: July 18, 2000.
- "Away With The Summer Days" for The Princess Diaries soundtrack

=== Singles ===
- 1999: "I'll Be Your Everything" (Note: There are two versions of this song. The album version from the album entitled "Let's Roll" has suggestive lyrics while the "Disney version” used in the 1999 Disney film Inspector Gadget has cleaner lyrics.)
- 1999: "It's Not What You Think" (from soundtrack for The Famous Jett Jackson)
- 2000: "Pedal to the Steel" (featuring Kel Mitchell), Released: November 21, 2000 (import)
- 2000: "The Prince You Charmed"
- 2001: "Sugar" (enhanced single)
- 2001: "Anything and Everything" (from the Summer Catch soundtrack)
