= The Lizzie McGuire Movie (soundtrack) =

2003 soundtrack album by Various artists

The Lizzie McGuire Movie (Original Motion Picture Soundtrack)

Soundtrack album by Various artists
- Released: April 22, 2003
- Genre: Pop
- Length: 47:44
- Label: Walt Disney
- Producers: Various: Chico Bennett; Robbie Buchanan; Jill Cunniff; Cliff Eidelman; Matthew Gerrard; Lee Gillette; Jem Godfrey; Christian Hamm; Mark Hammond; Jay Landers; Stephen Lironi; Marco Marinangeli; Charlie Midnight; Bill Padley; Pop Rox; Andre Recke

Singles from The Lizzie McGuire Movie
- 1. "Why Not" Released: March 21, 2003

The Lizzie McGuire Movie (Original Motion Picture Soundtrack) is a soundtrack album to the 2003 film The Lizzie McGuire Movie. It was released on April 22, 2003, by Walt Disney Records.

== Music ==
It is composed primarily of songs from (or inspired by) the film, including Hilary Duff's "Why Not" and her sister Haylie's "Girl in the Band". "Why Not" was released to Radio Disney on March 21, 2003. It was released in Australia and Europe on June 23, 2003. A version of "Why Not" featuring different lyrics in the first verse was later included on Duff's second studio album, Metamorphosis. Duff referred to "Why Not" as "a song that I really love. It's really fun, and about just letting loose, so it's really cool".

While actor Yani Gellman played the pop singer Paolo on screen, the book Disney High revealed that the ballad version of "What Dreams Are Made Of" that appears in the movie and on the soundtrack was actually a demo recording with music producer Mark Hammond singing for Paolo and a local singer named Amy Owsley singing for Isabella. Hammond told author Ashley Spencer that he didn't know his version of the track would be used in the movie until he heard it at the film's premiere.

== Critical reception ==
Heather Phares of AllMusic called The Lizzie McGuire Movie Soundtrack a "fun but not especially memorable soundtrack".

== Commercial performance ==
Two weeks after its release, The Lizzie McGuire Movie was certified gold by the Recording Industry Association of America (RIAA) for shipments of over 500,000 copies in the United States. The soundtrack was number ten on the week of May 14, selling 92,900 copies, which was 30% gain over the previous week. The next week saw a sales decrease of 16% to 78,000 copies, despite raising two spots to number eight. On the week of May 28, the soundtrack remained at number eight, selling an additional 77,000 copies. The album has been certified platinum by the CRIA, and 2× platinum by the RIAA for selling 2,000,000 copies in the U.S.

== Track listing ==
No.	Title	Writer(s)	Producer(s)	Length
1.	"Why Not" (performed by Hilary Duff)	Charlie Midnight; Matthew Gerrard	Gerrard; Andre Recke^{[a]}; Jay Landers^{[a]}	2:59
2.	"The Tide Is High (Get the Feeling)" (performed by Atomic Kitten)	John Holt; Garth Evans; Howard Barrett; Brian Padley; Jermey Godfrey	Bill Padley; Jem Godfrey	3:22
3.	"All Around the World" (performed by Cooler Kids)	Samuel Hollander; David Schommer; Jill Cunniff	Pop Rox; Cunniff^{[b]}	4:12
4.	"What Dreams Are Made Of" (Ballad Version) (performed by Mark Hammond and Amy Owsley)	Dean Pitchford; Matthew Wilder	Mark Hammond	1:44
5.	"Shining Star" (performed by Jump5)	Maurice White; Philip Bailey; Larry Dunn	Hammond	3:17
6.	"Volaré" (performed by Vitamin C)	Mitchell Parish; Francesco Migliacci; Domenico Modugno	Christian Hamm	3:00
7.	"Open Your Eyes (To Love)" (performed by LMNT)	David Friedman	Robbie Buchanan	2:29
8.	"You Make Me Feel Like a Star" (Lizzie Mix) (performed by The Beu Sisters)	Candice Beu; Christie Beu; Shelly Peiken; Rick Neigher	Stephen Lironi; Hamm^{[c]}	3:05
9.	"Supermodel" (performed by Taylor Dayne)	RuPaul Charles; Jimmy Harry; Lawrence Thom	Marco Marinangeli	3:45
10.	"What Dreams Are Made Of" (performed by Hilary Duff)	Pitchford; Wilder	Hammond; Chico Bennett	4:02
11.	"On an Evening in Roma" (performed by Dean Martin)	Alessandro Taccani; Umberto Bertini	Lee Gillette	2:25
12.	"Girl in the Band" (performed by Haylie Duff)	Bennett; Midnight	Bennett; Midnight	3:01
13.	"Orchestral Suite from The Lizzie McGuire Movie" (performed by Cliff Eidelman)	Eidelman	Eidelman	7:31
14.	"Why Not" (McMix) (performed by Hilary Duff)	Midnight; Gerrard	Gerrard; Recke^{[a]}; Landers^{[a]}; Bennett^{[c]}	2:52
Total length:				47:44

Notes

- ^{^[a]} – indicates executive producer
- ^{^[b]} – indicates co-producer
- ^{^[c]} – indicates remixer

== Charts ==
=== Weekly charts ===
Chart (2003)	Peak position
Australian Albums (ARIA)	6
Canadian Albums (Billboard)	8
US Billboard 200	6
US Soundtrack Albums (Billboard)	1

=== Year-end charts ===
Chart (2003)	Position
Australian Albums (ARIA)	81
US Billboard 200	44
US Soundtrack Albums (Billboard)	4

Chart (2004)	Position
US Billboard 200	199
US Soundtrack Albums (Billboard)	7

== Certifications ==
Region	Certification	Certified units/sales
Australia (ARIA)	Gold	35,000^{^}
Canada (Music Canada)	Platinum	100,000^{^}
United States (RIAA)	2× Platinum	2,000,000^{^}
^{^} Shipments figures based on certification alone.

== Score ==
The Lizzie McGuire Movie

Film score by Cliff Eidelman
- Released: April 22, 2003
- Length: 33:37
- Label: Walt Disney

The Lizzie McGuire Movie score was composed by Cliff Eidelman, and has never received any commercial release.

=== Track listing ===
No.	Title	Length
1.	"Lizzie's Theme"	2:15
2.	"Romancing Lizzie"	2:23
3.	"Meet Miss Ungermeyer"	1:14
4.	"Graduation Day"	1:55
5.	"Lizzie's Embarrassment"	0:45
6.	"Tearful Goodbyes"	0:48
7.	"Lift Off"	0:59
8.	"Paolo's Plight"	2:13
9.	"Dash To The Hotel"	2:29
10.	"The Billboard"	1:07
11.	"The Aventure Begins"	1:11
12.	"Gordo To The Rescue"	0:51
13.	"Main Title/Operation Sister Surveillance"	1:27
14.	"Romancing Rome (Street Music)"	1:28
15.	"The Plan"	0:40
16.	"Slow Curve"	1:07
17.	"Cliff's Mod Odyssey"	2:13
18.	"Very Old Isabella"	0:31
19.	"Matt Pleas, Lizzie Sneaks"	1:28
20.	"Lizzie Takes A Stand"	0:50
21.	"Gordo Spots Isabella"	1:12
22.	"Lizzie Laments, Room Check"	0:50
23.	"The Truth About Paolo"	1:10
24.	"Lizzie And Isabella Take A Bow"	1:27
25.	"The Kiss"	1:04
Total length:		33:37
