= I'll Be Your Everything (Youngstown song) =

Single by Youngstown

from the album Let's Roll
- Released: June 26, 1999
- Recorded: July 1998 – February 1999
- Genre: Pop
- Length: 3:37
- Label: Hollywood Records
- Songwriter(s): Haim Saban, Shuki Levy, Steve Durham, Tim James, Josh Stevens & Skee-Lo
- Producer(s): Groove Brothers

"I'll Be Your Everything" is a song by the boy band Youngstown that served as the theme for the 1999 Walt Disney Pictures film Inspector Gadget. The song was written by Haim Saban, Shuki Levy, Steve Durham, Skee-Lo, Tim James and Josh Stevens and produced by the Groove Brothers.

The Disney version can be heard in the movie Inspector Gadget and the album version can be heard on Youngstown's debut album Let's Roll. The song peaked at #71 on the Billboard Hot 100 chart in August 1999.
