= Why Not (song) =

Single by Hilary Duff

from the album The Lizzie McGuire Movie and Metamorphosis
- B-side: "I Can't Wait"
- Released: June 16, 2003
- Recorded: January 2003
- Length: 2:59
- Label: Walt Disney
- Songwriters: Charlie Midnight; Matthew Gerrard
- Producer: Matthew Gerrard

Hilary Duff singles chronology
"Tell Me a Story" (2002)	"Why Not" (2003)	"So Yesterday" (2003)

Audio video
- "Why Not" on YouTube

"Why Not" is a song recorded by American actress and singer Hilary Duff. It was written by Charlie Midnight with Matthew Gerrard, who also produced the song. It was released in June 2003 as the first single from The Lizzie McGuire Movie soundtrack. The version of the song on Duff's 2003 album, Metamorphosis, features different lyrics in the first verse.

== Release ==
In the United States, "Why Not" received airplay only on Radio Disney, and "So Yesterday" served as the first official single from Duff's second album, Metamorphosis. Festival Mushroom Records released "Why Not" commercially in Australia on June 16, 2003. The CD single release includes a remix of "Why Not," a remix of "I Can't Wait" and the music video. Later in 2003, a different version of "Why Not" was included on Metamorphosis. Although promoted from The Lizzie McGuire Movie soundtrack, Duff considers the song a single from Metamorphosis as well.

== Versions ==
"Why Not" has four versions. The main version is the one that Duff originally recorded for the soundtrack of The Lizzie McGuire Movie. The second version features different lyrics in the first verse and was included on Metamorphosis. A third version was released on Duff's 2005 compilation album, Most Wanted, and is a slightly remixed version of the recording released on Metamorphosis. The Metamorphosis album version is included on Duff's 2008 compilation album, Best of Hilary Duff. In addition, a newly re-recorded version subtitled "(Mine)", was included on the Walmart exclusive edition of Duff’s 2026 album Luck… or Something, and later her third extended play (Mine), which features several re-recordings of her earlier hits.

== Commercial performance ==
The single debuted on the Australian ARIA Singles Chart at number 43 in June 2003, and it peaked at number 14 during its fifth week, remaining in the top 50 for 16 weeks. The song also reached the top 20 in the Netherlands and New Zealand. As of July 27, 2014, the song had sold 124,000 digital copies in the United States.

== Music video ==
The music video was directed by Elliott Lester and shot in downtown Los Angeles. It premiered on the Disney Channel on March 21, 2003, after the premiere of the Disney Channel Original Movie Right on Track. The video became the first of Duff's to air on MTV after a viewer requested it on the popular show Total Request Live. The video debuted on the show's countdown at number six a few days later. The video shows Duff singing from a rooftop; this is inter-cut with scenes of street scenes of skipping, break dancing and crowds running, as well as waist shots of extras mouthing the words. Two distinct versions of the video exist; the one includes scenes from The Lizzie McGuire Movie while the other does not.

== Track listing ==
"Why Not" – Australian maxi single
No.	Title	Writer(s)	Length
1.	"Why Not"	Charlie Midnight; Matthew Gerrard	2:59
2.	"Why Not" (McMix)	Midnight; Gerrard	2:52
3.	"I Can't Wait" (dance mix)	Gerrard; Brooke McClymont; Christopher Ward	3:06
4.	"Why Not" (CD-ROM music video)	Midnight; Gerrard	2:59
Total length:			11:56

== Charts ==
=== Weekly charts ===
Weekly chart performance for "Why Not"
Chart (2003–2004)	Peak position
Australia (ARIA)	14
Netherlands (Dutch Top 40)	20
Netherlands (Single Top 100)	22
New Zealand (Recorded Music NZ)	15

=== Year-end charts ===
Year-end chart performance for "Why Not"
Chart (2003)	Position
Australia (ARIA)	94

== Release history ==
Release dates and formats for "Why Not"
Region	Date	Format	Label	Ref.
Australia	June 16, 2003	CD	Festival Mushroom	
