= List of songs recorded by Hilary Duff =

American actress and singer Hilary Duff has recorded her discography primarily as a solo artist but has also been credited as part of a group or ensemble as well. As such, this page covers all of Duff's officially released material, which includes album tracks, extended plays (EPs), singles, soundtrack appearances, compilation tracks, re-recorded songs and officially released alternate versions of many of her songs.

This page also covers unreleased material associated with film and television projects, works registered with music rights databases, songs discussed by Duff in interviews or on social media, and material that has leaked online.

== Released songs (original recordings) ==
Throughout her career, Duff has released a total of 111 songs for which she is individually credited as a solo recording artist. This section serves as Duff's primary discography, with all entries below referring to the original recordings and their originating albums.

Original recordings released by Hilary Duff
Song	Other performer(s)	Writer(s)	Originating album	Year	Ref.
"9 to 5"	Sutton Foster; Miriam Shor	Dolly Parton	Younger (TV Land Series Soundtrack) (Note: 9 to 5 is a shortened version of Dolly Parton's original song.)	2021	
"Adult Size Medium"	—N/a	Hilary Duff; Matthew Koma; Brian Douglas Phillips	Luck... or Something	2026	
"All About You"	—N/a	Hilary Duff; Kristian Lundin; Savan Kotecha; Carl Falk	Breathe In. Breathe Out.	2014	
"All You Want for Christmas Is Me"	—N/a	Hilary Duff; Matthew Koma; Brian Douglas Phillips	Holiday Things (EP)	2026	
"Any Other Day"	—N/a	Hilary Duff; Jonathan Glatzer; Robert Lawson	What Goes Up (Original Motion Picture Soundtrack)	2009	
"Anywhere but Here"	—N/a	Jim Marr; Wendy Page; Chico Bennett	Metamorphosis	2003	
"Arms Around a Memory"	—N/a	Matthew Koma	Breathe In. Breathe Out.	2015	
"Beat of My Heart"	—N/a	Dead Executives; Hilary Duff	Most Wanted	2005	
"Belong"	—N/a	Sam Watters; Edwin "Lil Eddie" Serrano; Mike Einziger; Tobias Gad	Breathe In. Breathe Out. (Note: Belong and Rebel Hearts were initially released as bonus tracks on the Target-exclusive deluxe edition of Breathe In. Breathe Out. in the United States, and on international deluxe editions of the album as well.)	2015	
"Between You and Me"	—N/a	Hilary Duff; Kara DioGuardi; Chico Bennett; Richard Vission	Dignity	2007	
"Brave Heart"	—N/a	Hilary Duff; Jerrod Bettis; Sean Douglas	Breathe In. Breathe Out.	2015	
"Break My Heart"	—N/a	Dead Executives; Hilary Duff	Most Wanted	2005	
"Breathe In. Breathe Out."	—N/a	Matthew Koma; Dan Book	Breathe In. Breathe Out.	2015	
"Burned"	—N/a	Hilary Duff; Kara DioGuardi; Fredwreck Nassar	Dignity	2007	
"CATastrophe"	—N/a	Hilary Duff; Matthew Koma; Madison Love; Brian Douglas Phillips	The Cat in the Hat (Original Motion Picture Soundtrack)	2026	
"Chasing the Sun"	—N/a	Colbie Caillat; Jason Reeves; Toby Gad	Breathe In. Breathe Out.	2014	
"Come Clean"	—N/a	Kara DioGuardi; John Shanks	Metamorphosis	2003	
"Confetti"	—N/a	Matthew Koma; Kevin Nicholas Drew; Richard W. Nowels; Ellen Shipley	Breathe In. Breathe Out. (Note: Confetti contains an interpolation of "Heaven Is a Place on Earth" by Belinda Carlisle.)	2015	
"Crash World"	—N/a	Desmond Child; Andreas Carlsson; Julian Bunetta	A Cinderella Story: Original Soundtrack	2004	
"Cry"	—N/a	Charlie Midnight; Marc Swersky; Charlton Pettus	Hilary Duff	2004	
"Danger"	—N/a	Hilary Duff; Kara DioGuardi; Vada Nobles; Mateo Camargo; Julius Diaz	Dignity	2007	
"Dangerous to Know"	—N/a	Charlie Midnight; Wendy Page; Jim Marr	Hilary Duff	2004	
"A Day in the Sun"	—N/a	Charlie Midnight; Matthew Gerrard	Metamorphosis (Note: A Day in the Sun only appeared on the Asian, Australian and Japanese editions of Metamorphosis. Anneliese van der Pol later covered the song, with altered lyrics, for the 2006 compilation album That's So Raven Too!.)	2003	
"Dignity"	—N/a	Hilary Duff; Kara DioGuardi; Chico Bennett; Richard Vission	Dignity	2007	
"Do You Want Me?"	—N/a	Matthew Gerrard; Kara DioGuardi	Hilary Duff	2004	
"Dreamer"	—N/a	Hilary Duff; Kara DioGuardi; Fredwreck Nassar	Dignity	2007	
"Fly"	—N/a	Kara DioGuardi; John Shanks	Hilary Duff	2004	
"Future Tripping"	—N/a	Hilary Duff; Matthew Koma; Maya Kurchner; Brian Douglas Phillips	Luck... or Something	2026	
"The Getaway"	—N/a	Julian Bunetta; James Michael	Hilary Duff	2004	
"Girl Can Rock"	—N/a	Charlie Midnight; Denny Weston, Jr.	Metamorphosis	2003	
"Growing Up"	—N/a	Hilary Duff; Matthew Koma; Thomas DeLonge; Mark Hoppus; Brian Douglas Phillips; Scott Raynor	Luck... or Something (Note: Growing Up contains an interpolation of "Dammit" by Blink-182.)	2026	
"Gypsy Woman"	—N/a	Hilary Duff; Haylie Duff; Ryan Tedder	Dignity (Note: Gypsy Woman features a spoken-word sample from Winston Churchill's 1940 speech "This was their finest hour", specifically the line "The battle of France is over", which appears at the beginning and end of the track.)	2007	
"Happy"	—N/a	Hilary Duff; Kara DioGuardi; Mitch Allan; Rhett Lawrence	Dignity (Note: SOCAN registrations associate the titles Happy and Play with Fire across multiple work registrations. Work No. 35704272 lists the original work title Play with Fire and the alternate titles Happy and I Found Something Really Really Big TC Massive. Work No. 37523727 lists the original work title Happy and the alternate title Happy Playing with Fire. Additional registrations exist under the original work titles Happy (Work Nos. 45274164 and 78055475) and Play with Fire (Work No. 70105464). Play with Fire was originally titled Happy before its lyrics and instrumentals were changed, and Happy became a separate track on Dignity.)	2007	
"Haters"	—N/a	Hilary Duff; Haylie Duff; Charlie Midnight; Marc Swersky	Hilary Duff	2004	
"Have Yourself a Merry Little Christmas"	—N/a	Hugh Martin; Ralph Blane	Holiday Things (EP)	2026	
"Hide Away"	—N/a	Shaun Shankel; Charlie Midnight; Trina Harmon; Tyler Hayes Bieck	Hilary Duff	2004	
"Holiday"	—N/a	Ryan Tedder; Hilary Duff; Haylie Duff	Best of Hilary Duff	2008	
"Holiday Party"	—N/a	Hilary Duff; Matthew Koma; Maya Kurchner; Brian Douglas Phillips; Sxssy	Luck... or Something	2026	
"I Am"	—N/a	Diane Warren	Hilary Duff	2004	
"I Can't Wait"	—N/a	Matthew Gerrard; Brooke McClymont; Christopher Ward	Lizzie McGuire (soundtrack)	2002	
"I Guess It's Christmas"	—N/a	Hilary Duff; Matthew Koma; Madison Love; Brian Douglas Phillips	Holiday Things (EP)	2026	
"I Heard Santa on the Radio"	Christina Milian	Charlie Midnight; Chris Hamm	Santa Claus Lane	2002	
"I Want (A Few Small Things)"	—N/a	Hilary Duff; Matthew Koma; Brian Douglas Phillips	Holiday Things (EP)	2026	
"I Wish"	—N/a	Hilary Duff; Kara DioGuardi; Tim Kelley; Bob Robinson	Dignity	2007	
"(I'll Give) Anything but Up!"	—N/a	Hilary Duff; Charlie Midnight; Wendy Page; Jim Marr; Marc Swersky; Sarah Durkee	Marlo Thomas and Friends: Thanks & Giving All Year Long	2004	
"Inner Strength"	—N/a	Haylie Duff	Metamorphosis	2003	
"Jericho"	—N/a	Charlie Midnight; Chico Bennett	Hilary Duff	2004	
"Jingle Bell Rock"	—N/a	Joseph Carleton Beal; James Ross Boothe	Santa Claus Lane	2002	
"Last Christmas"	—N/a	George Michael	Santa Claus Lane	2002	
"The Last Song"	—N/a	Haylie Duff; Kevin De Clue	Hilary Duff	2004	
"Lies"	—N/a	Hilary Duff; Oscar Holter; Albin Nedler; Kristoffer Fogelmark	Breathe In. Breathe Out.	2015	
"Little Lies"	—N/a	Christine McVie; Eddy Quintela	Non-album single (Note: Little Lies was originally released in 2016 as a promotional single for the second season of Younger, and was later included on the 2021 soundtrack album Younger (TV Land Series Soundtrack).)	2016	
"Little Voice"	—N/a	Kara DioGuardi; Patrik Berger	Metamorphosis	2003	
"Love Just Is"	—N/a	Jim Marr; Wendy Page; Charlie Midnight	Metamorphosis	2003	
"Material Girl"	Haylie Duff	Peter Brown; Robert Rans	Girl Next	2006	
"The Math"	—N/a	Lauren Christy; Scott Spock; Graham Edwards; Charlie Midnight	Metamorphosis	2003	
"Mature"	—N/a	Hilary Duff; Matthew Koma; Madison Love; Brian Douglas Phillips	Luck... or Something	2025	
"Metamorphosis"	—N/a	Hilary Duff; Charlie Midnight; Chico Bennett; Andre Recke	Metamorphosis	2003	
"Mr. James Dean"	—N/a	Hilary Duff; Haylie Duff; Kevin De Clue	Hilary Duff	2004	
"My Generation"	—N/a	Pete Townshend	Hilary Duff (Note: Duff's cover of The Who's My Generation was initially only released on the Japanese edition of Hilary Duff. It later appeared as a B-side on the 2005 CD single for Someone's Watching Over Me, which was released only in Australia and New Zealand.)	2004	
"My Kind"	—N/a	Jason Gill; Elina Stridh	Breathe In. Breathe Out.	2015	
"Never Let You Go"	RAC; Matthew Koma	Stephan Jenkins	Non-album single	2020	
"Never Stop"	—N/a	Hilary Duff; Kara DioGuardi; Chico Bennett; Richard Vission	Dignity	2007	
"Night Like This"	Kendall Schmidt	Hilary Duff; Ian Kirkpatrick; Lindy Robbins	Breathe In. Breathe Out.	2015	
"No Work, All Play"	—N/a	Hilary Duff; Kara DioGuardi; Greg Wells	Dignity	2007	
"Now You Know"	—N/a	Kara DioGuardi; Charlton Pettus; Michelle Lewis	A Cinderella Story: Original Soundtrack	2004	
"One in a Million"	—N/a	Ebba Tove Elsa Nilsson; Oscar Görres; Ilya	Breathe In. Breathe Out.	2015	
"The Optimist"	—N/a	Hilary Duff; Matthew Koma; Zack Kardon; Brian Douglas Phillips	Luck... or Something	2026	
"Our Lips Are Sealed"	Haylie Duff	Jane Wiedlin; Terence Hall	A Cinderella Story: Original Soundtrack	2004	
"Outlaw"	—N/a	Hilary Duff; Ian Kirkpatrick; Lindy Robbins	Breathe In. Breathe Out. (Note: Outlaw was featured in the ninth episode of the first season of Younger, titled "I'm with Stupid", which aired on May 19, 2015. Duff later announced the download-only bonus tracks for the Fanjoy edition of Breathe In. Breathe Out., which included Outlaw, in an Instagram post. The Japanese edition of the album, released a few months after the initial release, also included the track.)	2015	
"Outside of You"	—N/a	Alecia Moore; Chantal Kreviazuk; Raine Maida	Dignity	2007	
"Party Up"	—N/a	Meredith Brooks; Taylor Rhodes; Ashley George	Metamorphosis	2003	
"Picture This"	—N/a	Hilary Duff; Christian Medice; Mitchy Collins	Breathe In. Breathe Out.	2015	
"Play with Fire"	—N/a	Hilary Duff; Kara DioGuardi; Rhett Lawrence; Will I Am	Dignity	2006	
"Reach Out"	R. Prophet (uncredited)	Martin Gore; Ryan Tedder; Evan Bogart; Mika Guillory	Best of Hilary Duff (Note: Reach Out contains a sample of "Personal Jesus" by Depeche Mode.)	2008	
"Rebel Hearts"	—N/a	Hilary Duff; Christopher J. Baran; Audra Mae; Skyler Stonestreet; Kara DioGuardi	Breathe In. Breathe Out.	2015	
"Rock This World"	—N/a	Charlie Midnight; Denny Weston, Jr. Ty Stevens; Hilary Duff	Hilary Duff	2004	
"Roommates"	—N/a	Hilary Duff; Matthew Koma; Brian Douglas Phillips	Luck... or Something	2026	
"Same Old Christmas"	Haylie Duff	Charlie Midnight; Marc Swersky	Santa Claus Lane	2002	
"Santa Claus Is Coming to Town"	—N/a	John Frederick Coots; Haven Gillespie	Santa Claus Lane	2002	
"Santa Claus Lane"	—N/a	Matthew Gerrard; Charlie Midnight; Bridget Benenate; Jay Landers	Santa Claus Lane	2002	
"Shine"	—N/a	Kara DioGuardi; Guy Chambers	Hilary Duff	2004	
"The Siamese Cat Song"	Haylie Duff	Sonny Burke; Peggy Lee	Disneymania 2	2004	
"Sleigh Ride"	—N/a	Leroy Anderson; Mitchell Parish	Santa Claus Lane	2002	
"So Yesterday"	—N/a	Lauren Christy; Scott Spock; Graham Edwards; Charlie Midnight	Metamorphosis	2003	
"Someone's Watching Over Me"	—N/a	Kara DioGuardi; John Shanks	Hilary Duff	2004	
"Sparks"	—N/a	Christian "Bloodshy" Karlsson; Peter Thomas; Ebba Tove Elsa Nilsson; Sam Shrieve	Breathe In. Breathe Out.	2015	
"Stay in Love"	—N/a	Michael Angelo; Ebba Tove Elsa Nilsson	Breathe In. Breathe Out.	2015	
"Stranger"	—N/a	Hilary Duff; Kara DioGuardi; Vada Nobles; Derrick Haruin; Julius Diaz	Dignity	2007	
"Supergirl"	—N/a	Kara DioGuardi; Greg Wells	Most Wanted (Note: Supergirl was included on The Collector's Signature Edition of Most Wanted in the United States and on the standard Japanese and Australian editions, but not on the standard U.S. edition.)	2005	
"Sweet Sixteen"	—N/a	Haylie Duff; Toran Caudell	Metamorphosis	2003	
"Tattoo"	—N/a	Ed Sheeran; Jake Gosling; Chris Leonard	Breathe In. Breathe Out.	2015	
"Tell Me a Story (About the Night Before)" Alternate title: "Tell Me a Story"	Lil' Romeo	Charlie Midnight; Chico Bennett; Jay Landers; Master P Lil' Romeo	Santa Claus Lane (Note: Tell Me a Story (About the Night Before) was shortened to Tell Me a Story on the 2003 reissue of Santa Claus Lane.)	2002	
"Tell Me That Won't Happen"	—N/a	Hilary Duff; Matthew Koma; Delacey; Maya Kurchner; Brian Douglas Phillips	Luck... or Something	2026	
"The Tiki, Tiki, Tiki Room"	—N/a	Robert Sherman; Richard Sherman	Disneymania	2002	
"Underneath This Smile"	—N/a	Kara DioGuardi; John Shanks	Hilary Duff	2004	
"Wake Up"	—N/a	Dead Executives; Hilary Duff	Most Wanted	2005	
"We Don't Talk"	—N/a	Hilary Duff; Matthew Koma; Dan Book	Luck... or Something	2026	
"Weather for Tennis"	—N/a	Hilary Duff; Matthew Koma; Brian Douglas Phillips	Luck... or Something	2026	
"Weird"	—N/a	Charlie Midnight; Marc Swersky; Ron Entwistle	Hilary Duff	2004	
"What Christmas Should Be"	—N/a	Charlie Midnight; Matthew Gerrard	Santa Claus Lane (Note: What Christmas Should Be was added as a bonus track on the 2003 reissue of Santa Claus Lane.)	2003	
"What Dreams Are Made Of"	—N/a	Dean Pitchford; Matthew Wilder	The Lizzie McGuire Movie (Original Motion Picture Soundtrack)	2003	
"When the Snow Comes Down in Tinseltown"	—N/a	Charlie Midnight	Santa Claus Lane	2002	
"Where Did I Go Right?"	—N/a	Lauren Christy; Scott Spock; Graham Edwards; Charlie Midnight	Metamorphosis	2003	
"Who's That Girl?"	—N/a	Charlie Midnight; Andreas Carlsson; Desmond Child	Hilary Duff	2004	
"Why Not"	—N/a	Charlie Midnight; Matthew Gerrard	The Lizzie McGuire Movie (Original Motion Picture Soundtrack) and Metamorphosis (Note: Both 2003 releases of Why Not on The Lizzie McGuire Movie (Original Motion Picture Soundtrack) and Metamorphosis share the same recording, but feature different opening verses.)	2003	
"With Love"	—N/a	Hilary Duff; Kara DioGuardi; Vada Nobles; Julius Diaz	Dignity	2007	
"Wonderful Christmastime"	—N/a	Paul McCartney	Santa Claus Lane	2002	
"Workin' It Out"	—N/a	Charlie Midnight; Charlton Pettus; Marc Swersky	Metamorphosis	2003	
"You, From the Honeymoon"	—N/a	Hilary Duff; Matthew Koma; Brian Douglas Phillips	Luck... or Something	2026	
"Youngblood"	Aubrey Peeples; Stefanie Scott	Martin Johnson; Fransisca Hall; Anjulie Persaud	Jem and the Holograms (Original Motion Picture Soundtrack)	2015	

== Group recordings ==
Songs in this section are recordings in which Duff is credited as part of a group or ensemble, though she has participated in only one such recording.

Group recordings featuring Hilary Duff
Song	Group / Ensemble	Writer(s)	Originating album	Year	Ref.
Circle of Life	Disney Channel; Circle of Stars	Tim Rice	Disneymania 2	2004	

== Re-recorded songs ==
The eight songs listed in this section were previously released by Duff and have since been re-recorded with new vocals.

Re-recorded songs by Hilary Duff
Song	Original album (year)	Re-recording album	Year	Ref.
"Come Clean (Mine)"	Metamorphosis (2003)	Luck... or Something	2026	
"Last Christmas (Mine)"	Santa Claus Lane (2002)	Holiday Things (EP)	2026	
"So Yesterday (Mine)"	Metamorphosis (2003)	Luck... or Something	2026	
"Sparks (Mine)"	Breathe In. Breathe Out. (2015)	Luck... or Something	2026	
"Wake Up (Mine)"	Most Wanted (2005)	Luck... or Something	2026	
"What Dreams Are Made Of (Mine)"	The Lizzie McGuire Movie (Original Motion Picture Soundtrack) (2003)	Luck... or Something	2026	
"Why Not (Mine)"	version from Metamorphosis (2003)	Luck... or Something	2026	
"With Love (Mine)"	Dignity (2007)	Luck... or Something	2026	

== Alternate versions ==
The alternate versions and derivative recordings listed in this section include remixes, acoustic versions, live recordings, revised recordings, radio edits and mixes, mash-ups, and other officially released versions of songs previously released by Duff, either as a solo artist or as part of a group or ensemble, that differ from the original recordings.

Alternate versions of songs recorded by Hilary Duff
Song	Other performer(s)	Version Type	Originating Album	Year	Ref.
"Beat of My Heart (Sugarcookie Remix)"	—	Remix	4Ever Hilary Duff	2006	
"Chasing the Sun (Dave Audé Remix)"	—	Remix	Breathe In. Breathe Out.	2015	
"Circle of Life (All-Star Remix)"	Disney Channel Circle of Stars	Remix	Disneyremixmania	2005	
"Come Clean (Cut to the Chase Club Mix – Radio Edit)"	—	Radio Edit/Remix	Come Clean: Remixes (Maxi-Single)	2004	
"Come Clean (Cut to the Chase Extended Club Mix)"	—	Remix	Come Clean: Remixes (Maxi-Single)	2004	
"Come Clean (Dance Mix)"	—	Remix	Dignity Remix EP	2007	
"Come Clean (Flood Remix Club)"	—	Remix	Come Clean: Remixes (Maxi-Single)	2004	
"Come Clean (Flood Remix Radio)" (Note: Come Clean (Flood Remix Radio) was later released as Come Clean (Remix 2005) on Most Wanted.)	—	Remix	Come Clean: Remixes (Maxi-Single)	2004	
"Come Clean (Joe Bermudez & Josh Harris Main Mix)"	—	Remix	Come Clean: Remixes (Maxi-Single)	2004	
"Come Clean (Radio Mix)"	—	Radio Remix	Metamorphosis	2003	
"Come Clean (Remix)"	—	Remix	Best of Hilary Duff	2008	
"Cry (Remix)"	—	Revised recording (Note: Cry (Remix), Do You Want Me?, Haters, Hide Away, I Am, Jericho, Rock This World, and Weird are revised versions of the original recordings with heavier, more rock-oriented instrumentation and were issued on later CD and vinyl pressings of Hilary Duff, as well as on digital and streaming releases. Cry is specifically titled Cry (Remix) on these releases.)	Hilary Duff	2004	
"Dignity (Richard Vission Remix)"	—	Remix	Dignity Remix EP	2007	
"Do You Want Me?"	—	Revised recording	Hilary Duff	2004	
"Do You Want Me? (From Sessions@AOL)"	—	Live recording	Most Wanted	2005	
"Fly (AOL Session)"	—	Live recording	Fly (Single)	2006	
"Haters"	—	Revised recording	Hilary Duff	2004	
"Hide Away"	—	Revised recording	Hilary Duff	2004	
"Holiday (Remix)"	—	Remix	Best of Hilary Duff	2008	
"I Am"	—	Revised recording	Hilary Duff	2004	
"I Am (Remix 2005)" (Note: I Am (Remix 2005) is a hidden song on Most Wanted that is appended after silence, at the end of the track Why Not.)	—	Remix	Most Wanted	2005	
"I Can't Wait (Dance Mix)"	—	Remix	Why Not? (single)	2003	
"Jericho"	—	Revised recording	Hilary Duff	2004	
"Jericho (Remix 2005)"	—	Remix	Most Wanted	2005	
"Mature (Joel Corry Remix)"	—	Remix	Mature (Joel Corry Remix) (single)	2025	
"Mature (Mellow)"	—	Mellow version	Luck... or Something	2026	
"Metamorphosis (Live)" (Note: Metamorphosis (Live) was released as a Target exclusive bonus track on the 2004 soundtrack album A Cinderella Story: Original Soundtrack.)	—	Live recording	A Cinderella Story: Original Soundtrack	2004	
"Party Up (Remix)"	—	Remix	Metamorphosis Remixes (EP)	2003	
"Party Up (Remix 2005)"	—	Remix	Most Wanted	2005	
"Play with Fire (Richard Vission Remix)"	—	Remix	Dignity Remix EP	2007	
"Play with Fire (Rock Mix)"	—	Remix	Dignity	2007	
"Play with Fire (Vada Mix)"	—	Remix	Dignity Remix EP	2007	
"Reach Out (Caramel Pod E Remix)"	—	Remix	Best of Hilary Duff	2008	
"Reach Out (Remix)"	—	Remix	Best of Hilary Duff	2008	
"Rock This World"	—	Revised recording	Hilary Duff	2004	
"Rock This World (Remix 2005)"	—	Remix	Most Wanted	2005	
"Roommates (Mellow)"	—	Mellow version	Luck... or Something	2026	
"Santa Claus Lane (North Pole Remix)" (Note: Santa Claus Lane (North Pole Remix) is the title of the song on the 2004 and 2005 editions of Radio Disney Jingle Jams. However, the streaming editions of Radio Disney Jingle Jams and Disney 2000s Holiday use the title Santa Claus Lane (Remix) for the same recording.)	—	Remix	Radio Disney Jingle Jams	2004	
"The Siamese Cat Song (Cat-Scratch Remix)"	Haylie Duff	Remix	Disneyremixmania	2005	
"So Yesterday (Radio Remix)"	—	Remix	4Ever Hilary Duff	2006	
"So Yesterday (Remix)"	—	Remix	Metamorphosis Remixes (EP)	2003	
"So Yesterday (Thunderpuss Remix)"	—	Remix	Metamorphosis	2003	
"Sparks (Cutmore Radio Mix)"	—	Radio Remix	Sparks (Cutmore Radio Mix) (single)	2015	
"Sparks (The Golden Pony Remix)"	—	Remix	Sparks (The Golden Pony Remix) (single)	2015	
"Stranger (Albert Castillo Club Mix)"	—	Remix	Stranger - Remixes	2007	
"Stranger (Albert Castillo Radio Edit)"	—	Radio Edit/Remix	Stranger - Remixes	2007	
"Stranger (Albert Castillo Remix)"	—	Remix	Stranger - Remixes	2007	
"Stranger (Bermudez & Preve Blue Room Neon Mix Mixshow Version)"	—	Remix	Stranger - Remixes	2007	
"Stranger (Bermudez & Preve Blue Room Neon Mix Radio Version)"	—	Remix	Stranger - Remixes	2007	
"Stranger (Jody den Broeder 86 Edit)"	—	Remix	Stranger - Remixes	2007	
"Stranger (Jody den Broeder 86 Remix)"	—	Remix	Stranger - Remixes	2007	
"Stranger (Jody den Broeder Royal Dub)"	—	Remix	Stranger - Remixes	2007	
"Stranger (Smax & Gold Club Mix)"	—	Remix	Best of Hilary Duff	2008	
"Stranger (Vada Mix)"	—	Remix	Dignity	2007	
"Stranger (Vission Solmatic Mix)"	—	Remix	Stranger - Remixes	2007	
"Stranger (Vission vs. Audé Edit)"	—	Remix	Stranger - Remixes	2007	
"Stranger (Vission vs. Audé Mixshow)"	—	Remix	Stranger - Remixes	2007	
"Stranger (Vission vs. Audé One Dub)"	—	Remix	Stranger - Remixes	2007	
"Stranger (Vission vs. Audé Remix)"	—	Remix	Stranger - Remixes	2007	
"Stranger (Wawa Club Mix)"	—	Remix	Stranger (Maxi-Single)	2007	
"Wake Up (DJ Kaya Dance Remix)"	—	Remix	Most Wanted	2005	
"Wake Up (DJ Kaya Long-T Remix)"	—	Remix	Most Wanted	2005	
"Weather for Tennis (Mellow)"	—	Mellow version	Luck... or Something	2026	
"Weird"	—	Revised recording	Hilary Duff	2004	
"The Whistle Mash Up" (Note: The Whistle Mash Up combines Hilary Duff's Sparks, Maroon 5's "Moves Like Jagger", Flo Rida's "Whistle", Foster the People's "Pumped Up Kicks", and Britney Spears' "I Wanna Go". The song also opens with a brief sample of Lauren Bacall's dialogue "You know how to whistle, don't you? You just put your lips together and blow" from the 1944 film To Have and Have Not. The track was available as a free download on Duff's official The Whistle Mash Up YouTube page for a limited time.)	Maroon 5 Flo Rida; Foster the People; Britney Spears	Mash-up	The Whistle Mash Up (single)	2015	
"Who's That Girl? (Acoustic Mix)"	—	Acoustic version	Hilary Duff	2004	
"Why Not (McMix)"	—	Remix	The Lizzie McGuire Movie (Original Motion Picture Soundtrack)	2003	
"Why Not (Remix)"	—	Remix	Metamorphosis Remixes (EP)	2003	
"Why Not (Remix 2005)"	—	Remix	Most Wanted	2005	
"With Love (Bimbo Jones Radio Edit)"	—	Radio Edit	Dignity	2007	
"With Love (Boosta Dub Remix)"	—	Remix	Dignity	2007	
"With Love (DJ Kaya Remix)"	—	Remix	Dignity	2007	
"With Love (Richard Vission Remix)"	—	Remix	Dignity Remix EP	2007	
"You, From the Honeymoon (Mellow)"	—	Mellow version	Luck... or Something	2026	

== Unreleased songs in film, television and other media ==
Songs in this section were recorded or performed by Duff for film, television, commercials, and other media projects but have not been commercially released on an album or as a single.

Unreleased songs in film, television, and other media by Hilary Duff
Song	Other performer(s)	Writer(s)	Project / Appearance	Role	Year	Ref.
"Boom, Boom, Bang, Bang"	—	Paul Hipp	War, Inc.	Yonica Babyyeah	2008	
"A Dream is a Wish Your Heart Makes"	—	Mack David; Al Hoffman; Jerry Livingston	Disney Mobile commercial	Herself	2008	
"I Want to Blow You Up"	—	Paul Hipp; John Cusack; Mark Leyner; Jeremy Pikser	War, Inc.	Yonica Babyyeah	2008	
"I'm the Best"	—	Aaron Mirman-Heslin	Dora the Explorer "Dora's Ice Skating Spectacular" (season 8, episode 10)	Jessica the Ice Witch	2013	
"Leader of the Pack"	Haylie Duff	Shadow Morton; Jeff Barry; Ellie Greenwich	American Dreams "Change a Comin'" (season 2, episode 8)	The Shangri-Las member	2003	
"Mickey Mouse March"	—	Jimmie Dodd	Disney Mobile commercial	Herself	2008	
"When You Wish Upon a Star"	—	Leigh Harline; Ned Washington	Disney Mobile commercial	Herself	2008	
"Your Phone Cut Out"	—	John Cusack; Mark Leyner; Jeremy Pikser	War, Inc.	Yonica Babyyeah	2008	

== Unreleased songs (registered works) ==
The songs listed in this section are unreleased works associated with Duff that have been documented through performing rights organizations such as ASCAP, SOCAN, and other music rights databases. These works have never been officially released and may have been written or co-written by Duff and in some cases, recorded or performed live by Duff.

Unreleased songs associated with Hilary Duff
Song	Notes	Ref.
"17" (Note: Registered with SOCAN under the work title 17 (Work No. 202327395). Still Seventeen is listed as an alternate title for the same registered work number.) Alternate title: "Still Seventeen"	Written by Melody Faith Federer, Oliver Elliot Goldstein, and Hilary Duff	
"Before the Light Changes"	Written by Rudolph J. Ollero, Melody Faith Federer, and Hilary Duff	
"Better Days"	Written by Mitchel Anthony Collins, Christian A. Medice, and Hilary Duff	
"Carry On"	Written by David Hall Hodges, Nolan Joseph Lambroza, and Hilary Duff	
"Don't Need a Hero"	Written by Tobias Gad, and Mike Posner	
"Falling" (Note: Registered with SOCAN under the work title Falling (Work No. 79733270).)	Written by Hilary Duff, Tobias Gad, and Wayne Hector	
"Feel Alive (Summer Heat)"	Written by Tobias Gad, Christy Lauren, and Hilary Duff	
"Gotta Get Away From You"	Written by Walter Anthony Cusick III	
"Heroine"	Written by Kara DioGuardi, James Everette Lawrence, Allan Scherr, and Hilary Duff	
"If I Fall"	Written by Tobias Gad, Wayne Hector, and Hilary Duff	
"It All Starts Tonight"	Written by Tobias Gad, Wayne Hector, and Hilary Duff	
"Like I Care"	Written by Steve Diamond, and Dennis Matkosky	
"Love Is a Battlefield" (Note: Love Is a Battlefield was performed live by Duff during the Dignity Tour (2007-08).)	Written by Michael Donald Chapman, and Holly Knight	
"Safety Glass" (Note: Registered with SOCAN under the work title Safety Glass (Work No. 86366548). Jonathan Glatzer and Robert Lawson are also credited as writers of the screenplay for the film What Goes Up, which was originally titled Safety Glass and stars Duff.)	Written by Hilary Duff, Jonathan Glatzer, and Robert Lawson	
"Slip Away"	Written by Joshua Stephen Grant, Cara Elizabeth Salimando, and Allan Scherr	
"Snow Globe"	Written by Anthony Collins, Billy Mann, Hilary Duff, Christian Medice, and Phoebe Ryan.	
"That's What Girls Do"	Written by Nina Meryl Ossoff, and Richard Supa	
"This Heart"	Written by Tobias Gad, Hilary Duff, and Lindy Robbins.	
"When We Were Young" (Note: Registered with SOCAN under the work title When We Were Young (Work No. 79733237).)	Written by Hilary Duff, Tobias Gad, and Wayne Hector	
"Wherever We Go" (Note: Registered with SOCAN under the work title Wherever We Go (Work No. 88043313).)	Written by Hilary Duff, Jason Evigan, Mitch Allan, and Ali Tamposi	
"Whistling Dixie" (Note: Registered with SOCAN under the work title Whistling Dixie (Work No. 79733183).)	Written by Hilary Duff, Tobias Gad, and Wayne Hector	
"Wild Night Out"	Written by Tobias Gad, Lindy Robbins, and Hilary Duff	

== Other known unreleased songs ==
Several unreleased songs by Duff have been mentioned in interviews, news articles or social media, while others are known only through official video recordings. Despite this, these songs have never been officially released.

Other known unreleased songs associated with Hilary Duff
Song	Other performer(s)	Notes	Ref.
"Apartment Number 4"	—	Intended for Luck... or Something, Duff mentioned the song in two separate interviews. During a TikTok Live interview on February 20, 2026, alongside her husband, Matthew Koma, Duff remarked that "there wasn't a whole bunch of duds" for the record before Koma reminded her of the song, which Koma said was recorded in 2023. In a September 23, 2026 interview with the Grammy Museum, Duff again identified Apartment Number 4 as an outtake, stating that it "wasn't good enough to make the record." During the latter interview, she estimated that there were "maybe two" outtakes from the album but did not identify the other outtake.	
"Hurts"	—	Recorded by Duff during the sessions for Breathe In. Breathe Out. The song title was revealed through an Instagram post on January 7, 2014.	
"I Need a Sunday"	Haylie Duff	Written for Duff by her sister, Haylie Duff, and recorded during the Metamorphosis era. Hilary Duff discussed the song in the June 2003 MTV article Hilary Duff Not Just for Kids while promoting her then-upcoming album, Metamorphosis. A performance of the song by Hilary and Haylie Duff was later featured on the VideoNow release Hilary Duff: A Day in My Life (2003). It is unknown whether the final recording was intended to be a duet by the Duff sisters or a solo Hilary Duff recording.	
"Northern Star"	—	Recorded by Duff during the sessions for Breathe In. Breathe Out. The song title was identified from a lyric sheet shared by Duff on Instagram on March 26, 2014, and was later confirmed by Duff in response to a fan inquiry on X. The song was also reported by Perez Hilton.	
"Take It for What It Is"	—	Recorded by Duff during the sessions for Breathe In. Breathe Out. The song title was revealed through an Instagram post on January 23, 2014.	
"Tied to You"	—	Recorded by Duff and meant for a new album, post-Breathe In. Breathe Out.. A snippet of the song, as well as the song's title was revealed through a now-deleted SnapChat post in early 2016, and was also mentioned in a 2016 interview with E! News.	

== Leaked songs ==
Songs listed in this section have been recorded by Duff and circulated online through unofficial leaks.

Leaked songs recorded by Hilary Duff
Song	Year leaked	Ref.
"Carry On"	2019	
"Feel Alive (Summer Heat)"	2019	
"Hurts"	2019	
"If I Fall"	2019	
"It All Starts Tonight"	2019	
"Neighborhood" (Note: Neighborhood is known only through unofficial leaks and has not been identified in any performing rights databases.)	2019	
"This Heart"	2019	
"Wherever We Go"	2019	
"Wild Night Out"	2019	
