= 4Ever Hilary Duff =

2006 compilation album by Hilary Duff

Compilation album by Hilary Duff
- Released: May 12, 2006
- Recorded: 2003–2005
- Genre: Pop rock; teen pop
- Length: 52:58
- Label: EMI; Hollywood

Hilary Duff chronology
Most Wanted (2005)	4Ever Hilary Duff (2006)	Dignity (2007)

Singles from 4Ever Hilary Duff
- 1. "Fly" Released: May 5, 2006 (re-release)

4Ever Hilary Duff is the second compilation album by American singer Hilary Duff. It was released exclusively in Italy on May 12, 2006, by EMI and Hollywood Records.

4Ever Hilary Duff compiles fifteen previously released tracks, the majority of which were being released in Italy for the first time. "Fly", originally released as the lead single from Hilary Duff, was re-released as the sole single from 4Ever Hilary Duff. A supplemental DVD of the same title was released a week after the album. The album debuted and peaked at number 12 on the Italian Albums chart.

== Background ==
4Ever Hilary Duff compiles material that was originally released on Duff's second and third studio albums Metamorphosis (2003) and Hilary Duff (2004), neither of which had been released in Italy, in addition to songs from Duff's first compilation Most Wanted (2005). It also contains Duff's 2004 cover of "Our Lips Are Sealed", recorded with her sister Haylie Duff for the soundtrack to A Cinderella Story, plus several alternate versions of songs taken from various single releases. Each song on the album was personally selected by Duff for inclusion. 4Ever Hilary Duff was released while Duff was in the midst of her Still Most Wanted tour, following two May dates in Milan, Italy at Discoteca Alcatraz.

"Fly", originally released as the lead single from Hilary Duff two years prior, was re-released as the sole single from 4Ever Hilary Duff on May 5, 2006. On May 18, 2006, the song debuted and peaked at number 13 on the Italian singles chart, spending 12 weeks on the chart.

== Track listing ==
No.	Title	Writer(s)	Original album	Length
1.	"Fly"	Kara DioGuardi; John Shanks	Hilary Duff, 2004	3:44
2.	"Weird"	Charlie Midnight; Marc Swersky; Ron Entwistle	Hilary Duff	2:55
3.	"Our Lips Are Sealed" (with Haylie Duff)	Jane Wiedlin; Terrance Hall	A Cinderella Story, 2004	2:39
4.	"Shine"	DioGuardi; Guy Chambers	Hilary Duff	3:28
5.	"Someone's Watching Over Me"	DioGuardi; Shanks	Hilary Duff	4:09
6.	"Anywhere But Here"	Chico Bennett; Jim Marr; Wendy Page	Metamorphosis, 2003	3:31
7.	"Who's That Girl?" (Acoustic Version)	Midnight; Andreas Carlsson; Desmond Child	Hilary Duff	3:30
8.	"Jericho" (Remix 2005)	Midnight; Bennett	Hilary Duff^{[a]}	3:48
9.	"Sweet Sixteen"	Haylie Duff; Toran Caudell	Metamorphosis	3:07
10.	"SuperGirl"	DioGuardi; Greg Wells	Most Wanted, 2005	2:51
11.	"Come Clean" (Joe Bermudez & Josh Harris Main Mix)	DioGuardi; Shanks	Metamorphosis	3:36
12.	"Wake Up" (DJ Kaya Long-T Remix)	Hilary Duff; Dead Executives	Most Wanted	5:28
13.	"Beat of My Heart" (Sugarcookie Remix)	Hilary Duff; Dead Executives	Most Wanted	2:55
14.	"So Yesterday" (Radio Remix)	Midnight; Lauren Christy; Scott Spock; Graham Edwards	Metamorphosis	3:39
15.	"Fly" (AOL Session)	DioGuardi; Shanks	Hilary Duff	3:42
Total length:				52:58

Notes

- ^{^[a]} This version was first released on special editions of Most Wanted. The original version appears on Hilary Duff.

== Personnel ==
- John Shanks – production (tracks 1, 4, 5, 11, 15)
- Charlie Midnight – production (tracks 2, 3, 7-9)
- Ron Entwistle – production (track 2)
- Marc Swersky – production (track 2)
- Spider – production (track 3)
- Chico Bennett – production (tracks 6, 8)
- Desmond Child – production (track 7)
- Andreas Carlsson – production (track 7)
- Joel Soyffer – mixing (track 7)
- Denny Weston Jr. – production (track 9)
- Greg Wells – production (track 10)
- Dead Executives – production (track 12, 13)
- The Matrix – production (track 14)

== Charts ==
Chart (2006)	Peak position
Italian Albums (FIMI)	12

== DVD release ==
4Ever Hilary Duff

Video by Hilary Duff
- Released: May 19, 2006
- Recorded: 2003–2005
- Label: EMI

Hilary Duff chronology
Learning to Fly (2004)	4Ever Hilary Duff (2006)

4Ever Hilary Duff is a video album by American singer Hilary Duff, released only in Italy on May 19, 2006. The DVD includes the recording of her Metamorphosis tour (first featured on The Girl Can Rock DVD) and most of her music videos up to that point. It was released a week after the album of the same title.

=== Track listing ===
4Ever Hilary Duff – The Concert (from Metamorphosis Tour)
No.	Title	Length
1.	"Girl Can Rock"
2.	"Little Voice"
3.	"Come Clean"
4.	"So Yesterday"
5.	"Anywhere but Here"
6.	"Metamorphosis"
7.	"Sweet Sixteen"
8.	"Where Did I Go Right"
9.	"Love Just Is"
10.	"Why Not"
11.	"The Math"
12.	"Workin' It Out"
13.	"Party Up"

4Ever Hilary Duff – Music videos
No.	Title	Length
1.	"Beat of My Heart"
2.	"Wake Up"
3.	"Come Clean"
4.	"Fly"
5.	"Our Lips Are Sealed"
6.	"So Yesterday"
