= Most Wanted (Hilary Duff album) =

Compilation album by Hilary Duff
- Released: August 10, 2005
- Recorded: 2003–2005
- Genres: Pop; dance-pop; rock
- Length: 48:58
- Label: Hollywood
- Producers: Chico Bennett; Meredith Brooks; Julian Bunetta; Andreas Carlsson; Desmond Child; Chris Cox; DJ Kaya; Kevin De Clue; Dead Executives; Haylie Duff; Hilary Duff; Matthew Gerrard; The Matrix; Charlie Midnight; Andre Recke; John Shanks; Joel Soyffer; Spider; Greg Wells; Denny Weston Jr.

Hilary Duff chronology
Hilary Duff (2004)	Most Wanted (2005)	4Ever Hilary Duff (2006)

The Collector's Signature Edition

Singles from Most Wanted
- 1. "Wake Up" Released: July 12, 2005; 2. "Beat of My Heart" Released: December 11, 2005; 3. "Fly" Released: March 13, 2006 (re-release)

Most Wanted is the first compilation album by American actress and singer Hilary Duff. It was released on August 10, 2005, by Hollywood Records. The album comprises ten previously released tracks (three of which are in a remixed form), and three new recordings: "Wake Up", "Beat of My Heart", and "Break My Heart". A deluxe edition of the album, subtitled The Collector's Signature Edition, was also released, containing additional remixes and another new recording "Supergirl". At first, Duff was concerned about the reaction of fans to the new songs, since they carry a "totally different sound" and are more dance-oriented than her previous music.

Following its release, Most Wanted received mostly negative reviews from critics, who deemed the release as premature, stating that Duff did not have enough material to warrant a compilation. However, the Dead Executives-produced tracks received favorable comments; critics wrote that they stood out from the rest of the album. In the United States, the album debuted atop the Billboard 200, becoming Duff's second number one entry on the chart, also becoming the second solo artist to chart on the Billboard 200 under the age of 18 twice, and sixth overall. It was later certified Platinum by the Recording Industry Association of America (RIAA). Elsewhere, it debuted at number one in Canada, and reached the top ten in Australia, Ireland, Italy, Japan and New Zealand.

Three singles were released from the album. The lead single, "Wake Up", was released in July 2005, and peaked within the top ten in countries including Italy, Norway and the United Kingdom. In the United States, the song reached number 29 and was certified Gold by the RIAA. The accompanying music video features Duff portraying styles from cities over the world like London and Tokyo. The second single, "Beat of My Heart", peaked in the top 20 in countries such as Australia, Italy and Spain. "Supergirl" was released in February 2006 exclusively to the iTunes Store as a promotional single and "Fly", originally released as the lead single from Hilary Duff, was re-released throughout Europe as the final single from Most Wanted. Duff embarked on the worldwide Still Most Wanted Tour in support of the album; the tour ran from July 2005 through September 2006.

== Background and development ==
On May 20, 2005, MTV News reported that Hilary Duff would be releasing a new album in August, comprising previously released tracks and four new recordings. It was also announced that preceding the album's release, she would begin a 32-date summer concert tour in support of the album. Four days later, on May 24, the album's title was revealed to be Most Wanted, and the album's release date was announced to be August 16, 2005. The following month, Duff said that she had been working with brothers Joel and Benji Madden, of the American rock band Good Charlotte, and Jason Epperson (together known under the production name the Dead Executives) to write and produce new songs for the compilation. She said that " ... they're three of my favorite songs I've ever done. ... It was really fun being in the studio with them." Described by Duff as the first time when "all the responsibility was on [her]", she went into the recording studio without the guidance of her record label or management. Duff said she did not tell anyone at her record label Hollywood Records about working with the Dead Executives. Joel, her boyfriend at the time, was aware that Duff sought new material, and knew that she wanted a "totally different sound". Together, the Dead Executives went into the recording studio and worked on new music for Duff, before bringing her into the studio to collectively work on them.

" ... The first one we're going to release ['Wake Up'] is very dancy, kind of pop – not '80s, but kind of with that in it, so it's very fun. Another ['Beat of My Heart'] is more techno, like DJ Sammy almost, and the third one ['Break My Heart'] is a pop-punk song, more like [Good Charlotte's] music."

— Duff on the new songs recorded for the album

Duff described working with them as pleasant, and the music as a new milestone in her career, stating that working with "people you're close with makes a world of difference when you're recording and being creative." At the same time, Duff was also nervous about how her fans would react to the new music. Duff recorded four tracks for the album, three of which appear on the standard edition of the album—"Wake Up", "Beat of My Heart" and "Break My Heart"— while the fourth appears only on the deluxe edition: "Supergirl". The song was penned by Duff alongside Kara DioGuardi and Greg Wells. The track listing for Most Wanted was revealed on July 12, 2005, and the album was released on August 16, 2005 in the United States and Canada. The Japanese standard edition of the album features the same track listing as The Collector's Signature Edition, with additional remixes of "Wake Up" by DJ Kaya, and was released on August 10, 2005. Another version with a bonus DVD including music videos to selected songs and "making of" clips was also released in the same region. In the US, the iTunes digital version includes an interview with Duff. A deluxe edition of the album, subtitled The Collector's Signature Edition, was also released, containing an acoustic version of "Who's That Girl?", an alternate version of "Jericho" and a remix of "Party Up" along with "Supergirl". The pressing features a different album art and was packed with four autographed photo cards and a wristband. Most Wanted also contains 10 previously released tracks from Metamorphosis (2003) and Hilary Duff (2004), as well as songs from soundtracks of Duff's films: The Lizzie McGuire Movie (2003) and A Cinderella Story (2004), three of which—"Come Clean", "Rock This World" and "Why Not"—are in a remixed form.

== New material ==
"Break My Heart"
A 20-second sample of "Break My Heart". The song features a heavy dance tone and was compared to the works by Good Charlotte.

"Wake Up", the opening track, is a mid-tempo number backed by dance, pop and electronic beats, and has "a more mature pop-techno sound" than Duff's previous work. Its instrumentation includes a guitar, bass and drums. Kelefa Anneth of The New York Times noted that the song contains musical influences of The Go-Go's. The lyrics of the song speak about having fun. Duff initially sings about the consequences of her fame and how people think they know "everything about [me]" ("There's people talking / They talk about me / They know my name / They think they know everything / But they don't know anything about me"). As the chorus draws near, the song takes on a "party anthem" approach, where Duff discusses the "struggle" for joy and self-confidence: "I know I make mistakes / I'm living life day to day / It's never really easy but it's OK..." According to Duff, the song "makes you want to forget about all the pressure of dealing with your boss, or your teacher, or your mom, or [whoever]," and lyrically discusses "getting out and not forgetting to have some fun." Duff has also said the song also "talks about being in all [my] favorite places in the world, which is Tokyo and Paris and London and New York." "Beat of My Heart", the third track on the album, is inspired by the new wave genre. The song also draws influences from the bubblegum pop and dance genres. It carries a "soft electronic pop" sound and has the heart beat sound as its base. According to Chuck Taylor of Billboard magazine, the phrase "beat of my heart" is repeated forty-four times in the song.

The next new track and the ninth track on the album, "Break My Heart" is another dance-inspired number incorporating pop punk elements, and was described as a "highly produced four-on-the-floor rocker." The song interpolates "slick and clean 'punk' guitars and a chugging rhythm". "Break My Heart" leans more towards the rock genre and was compared to the works of Good Charlotte. The lyrics describe the feelings faced by the protagonist, following her heartbreak. Bill Lamb of About.com observed that "Beat of My Heart" and "Break My Heart" were "cookie cutter copies" of Avril Lavigne's "Sk8er Boi" (2002). "Girl Can Rock", according to Anthony Miccio of Baltimore City Paper has a chord progression similar to the song "Cherry Pie" by American band Warrant. The song displays elements of country music and the lyrics are a "statement of purpose". Duff sings the chorus, backed by a guitar: "It ain't no shock/ The girl can rock".

The standard North American edition of Most Wanted includes remixes of "Come Clean", "Why Not", and "Rock This World"; other editions feature additional remixes of "Party Up", "Jericho", and "I Am", and an acoustic version of "Who's That Girl?". Duff described the remixes as having "sort of a Muse feel going on." According to Spence D. of IGN, "Come Clean" remixed by Chris Cox exhibits elements of house music, and he described the remix of "Why Not" as "hyperkinetic pop" sped-up to a "level of sugar high bounce". He classified "Rock This World" as displaying "Kid Rock-meets-Aerosmith rock blitz", however, Tricia Olszewski of The Washington Post described it as having a "barely noticeable" difference from the original. A remix of the Diane Warren-penned "I Am" is included as a hidden track, with added synths to give it "a decidedly '80s indie waver".

== Critical response ==
Professional ratings
Review scores
Source	Rating
About.com	4/5 stars
AllMusic	3/5 stars
Baltimore City Paper	(unfavorable)
BBC Music	(mixed)
Common Sense Media	2/5 stars
IGN	6.9/10
MTV Asia	5/10
The Philadelphia Inquirer	1.5/5 stars
The San Francisco Chronicle	(unfavorable)
Slant Magazine	2/5 stars

Stephen Thomas Erlewine of AllMusic gave a mixed review of Most Wanted, stating that "hardcore fans will be hard-pressed for a reason to add this to their collection" and that the new songs—"Wake Up", "Beat of My Heart" and "Break My Heart"—"sound a bit like leftovers". Although he wrote that Most Wanted "isn't a terrible album by any means, it's not particularly a good one, since Duff's two pop albums [Metamorphosis (2003) and Hilary Duff (2004)] have distinctive personalities that don't necessarily mesh together [...], and are both more fun than this." Bill Lamb of About.com noted that the three new songs "seem to be marking time instead of finding a new direction" but said that "[the] remaining bulk of this collection is strong." Anthony Miccio, from the Baltimore City Paper, wrote that the album "doesn't signify the closure of a brief career" but is "meant to satisfy an audience that won't be offended by the opportunity to buy their favorite songs again and again." He noted that Duff's voice was not strong enough and stated that the "rock tracks are surprisingly sluggish." Talia Kraines of BBC Music commented that " ... there isn't enough here to warrant a purchase if you're already the owner of her back catalogue. But if you're after your first taste of Duff-flavoured pop to listen to in the background as you do your homework, then this album can do no harm."

Spence D. of IGN stated that "the only draw for this album are the three new tracks and the three remixes." He further commented that Most Wanted is a "filler album" and that "[T]he new songs that are served up still show Duff chasing trends rather than setting them and actively searching for her own voice and image." Sal Cinquemani of Slant Magazine was critical of the album and lamented how nothing from her first album Santa Claus Lane (2002) was included. He also wrote "I literally laughed out loud when I heard the Duffster was releasing a best-of album titled Most Wanted." Cinquemani praised the Dead Executives produced tracks and concluded the review by writing that "apparently there aren't even enough bearable moments in Duff's recording career to fill one CD". Gabriel Leong of MTV Southeast Asia started the review by writing "A greatest hits album seems a tad flagrant when you've only had two albums so far. So let's call this one a compilation album instead." Leong noted that the title fitted the album perfectly and that it proves "its innocuous appeal of infectious bubblegum pop." David Hiltbrand of The Philadelphia Inquirer commented that it was "a little early in the career" to release a greatest hits album and that it showcased that "Duff is more product than talent." Aidin Vaziri of San Francisco Chronicle also commented that it was premature as it was too early in Duff's career to release a greatest hits compilation. He commended the new tracks produced by the Dead Executives writing that they "help alleviate the feeling that this is a total cash grab." In 2006, Rolling Stone included the album in their Lamest Greatest Hits Albums Ever list.

== Commercial performance ==
In the United States, Most Wanted debuted at number one, with sales of over 208,000 units. It became her first album to debut at the top, and her second album to top the chart after Metamorphosis (2003). It stayed at the same position in its second week of release, after a 40% drop in sales. In September 2005, the album was certified platinum by the Recording Industry Association of America (RIAA) for shipments of over one million copies. By January 13, 2007, the album had sold over 1.4 million in the United States. In Canada, the album became Duff's third consecutive album to debut at number one, selling 32,000 units in its initial week. In December 2005, it was certified two times platinum by the Canadian Recording Industry Association (CRIA) for shipments of over 200,000 copies. In Australia, the album debuted at number three and was certified platinum by the Australian Recording Industry Association (ARIA) for shipments of over 70,000 copies. In New Zealand, it debuted at number 17 and two weeks later, peaked at number 10 becoming Duff's first and only top 10 entry in New Zealand, to date. As of July 27, 2014, the album had sold 1,489,000 copies in the United States.

Overseas, in the United Kingdom, Most Wanted debuted at number 31, with first-week sales of 10,661 copies, and stayed on the chart for a total of five weeks. It was certified gold by the British Phonographic Industry (BPI) for shipments of 100,000 copies in January 2006. The album peaked at number eight on the Irish Albums Chart and stayed on the charts for eighteen weeks, with its final appearance on the chart at number sixty-nine. It was certified gold by the Irish Recorded Music Association (IRMA) denoting sales/shipments of 7,500 copies. In Japan, the album debuted at number three on the Oricon charts, with sales of 38,892 units. It stayed on the chart for fourteen weeks and was certified gold by the Recording Industry Association of Japan (RIAJ). Most Wanted also peaked within the top 10 in Italy and Ireland, and the top fifty in Mexico and Spain. Due to its appearance on many European charts, it peaked at number 59 on the European Albums Chart, as compiled by Billboard's Music & Media.

== Promotion ==
=== Singles ===
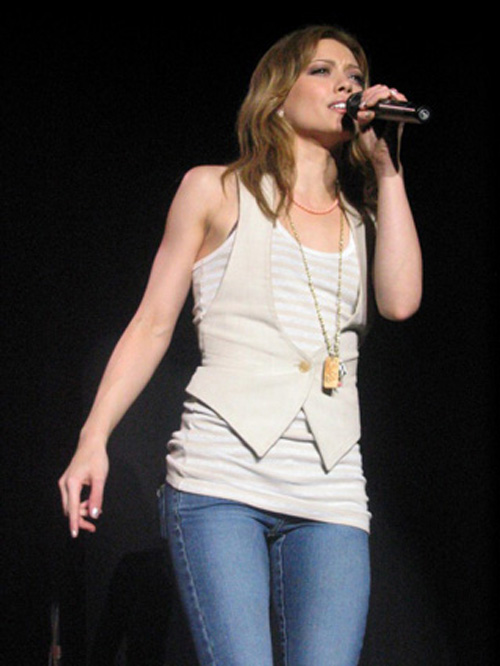
Duff performing during the Still Most Wanted Tour.

"Wake Up" was released as the lead single from Most Wanted. It was serviced to US mainstream radio on July 12, 2005, and was physically released on August 26, 2005. The song was met with generally mixed reviews from critics; a few noted that the Madden-produced track was a standout on the album. Chuck Taylor of Billboard called the song "an easy ace" and deemed it "a summer beach staple". He also commended Duff's vocal style in the song and remarked that it would "put her singing career on par with her hyperactive acting endeavors." Stephen Thomas Erlewine of AllMusic commented that it sounded like "leftovers" Commercially, "Wake Up" peaked within the top 10 in Italy, Ireland, Norway, Spain and the United Kingdom. In the United States, the song reached number 29 on the Billboard Hot 100, becoming Duff's highest peak at the time. The accompanying music video for the song, directed by Marc Webb, portrays Duff in several different looks, representing styles from Tokyo, London, Paris and New York City.

"Beat of My Heart" was released as the second single from Most Wanted on December 12, 2005. The song received generally negative reviews from critics, who labelled it repetitive. Chuck Taylor of Billboard wrote: "Pop music is always appreciated, but this is a kiddie anthem, plain and simple, so repetitive and childlike [...] that is hardly a contender for contemporary radio." The song failed to chart in the US, but was a moderate success elsewhere, peaking within the top 10 in Italy, and the top-twenty in Australia and Spain. The song's accompanying music video, directed by Phil Harder, was influenced by the opening title sequences of James Bond films, and Duff sports different looks inspired by the different eras of the Bond films. In a few European countries, "Fly" was released as the second single from Most Wanted on March 13, 2006. It charted and peaked at number 20 on the UK Singles Chart and number 13 on the Italian Singles Chart. A third single from the album was planned to be released, but due to Duff's busy schedule and exhaustion from touring, it did not materialize. Instead, "Supergirl" was released as a download-only single on February 28, 2006. "Wake Up" and "Supergirl" were also used in an advertisement campaign to promote Candie's' clothing line for young women in 2005–06.

=== Tour ===
To promote the album, Duff embarked on a worldwide arena tour. Titled the Still Most Wanted Tour, the tour—an extension of the Most Wanted Tour (2004–2005)—began on July 12, 2005 in Los Angeles, California at the Greek Theatre, with a United States leg. Following the end of the US leg in September, it visited Australia in December. Duff then made her Canadian touring debut in January 2006, before heading off to Europe in April. She then visited Latin America, before closing the tour up with various dates in North America from June to September 2006. The set list contained songs from Metamorphosis and Hilary Duff. Duff also premiered "Wake Up", "Beat of My Heart" and "Break My Heart" on the tour.

== Track listing ==
North American edition
No.	Title	Writer(s)	Original album	Length
1.	"Wake Up"	Hilary Duff; Dead Executives		3:38
2.	"The Getaway"	Julian Bunetta; James Michael	Hilary Duff, 2004	3:37
3.	"Beat of My Heart"	Hilary Duff; Dead Executives		3:09
4.	"Come Clean" (Remix 2005)	Kara DioGuardi; John Shanks	Metamorphosis, 2003^{[a]}	3:44
5.	"Mr. James Dean"	Hilary Duff; Haylie Duff; Kevin De Clue	Hilary Duff	3:29
6.	"So Yesterday"	Charlie Midnight; Lauren Christy; Scott Spock; Graham Edwards	Metamorphosis	3:35
7.	"Metamorphosis"	Hilary Duff; Midnight; Chico Bennett; Andre Recke	Metamorphosis	3:28
8.	"Rock This World" (Remix 2005)	Hilary Duff; Midnight; Denny Weston Jr.; Ty Stevens	Hilary Duff^{[b]}	3:58
9.	"Break My Heart"	Hilary Duff; Dead Executives		3:21
10.	"Fly"	DioGuardi; Shanks	Hilary Duff	3:43
11.	"Girl Can Rock"	Midnight; Weston	Metamorphosis^{[b]}	3:04
12.	"Our Lips Are Sealed" (with Haylie Duff)	Jane Wiedlin; Terence Hall	A Cinderella Story, 2004	2:40
13.	"Why Not" (Remix 2005)	Midnight; Matthew Gerrard	The Lizzie McGuire Movie, 2003^{[b]}	2:59
Total length:				44:25

International edition
No.	Title	Writer(s)	Original album	Length
14.	"I Am" (Remix 2005) (hidden track)	Diane Warren	Hilary Duff^{[b]}	4:03
Total length:				48:58

Target bonus track
No.	Title	Writer(s)	Original album	Length
14.	"Do You Want Me?" (AOL session)	DioGuardi; Gerrard	Hilary Duff^{[b]}	3:44
15.	"I Am" (Remix 2005) (hidden track)	Diane Warren	Hilary Duff^{[b]}	4:03
Total length:				52:44

Radio Disney bonus track
No.	Title	Length
14.	"Hilary Duff Most Wanted Interview"	2:58
Total length:		47:23

Australian edition
No.	Title	Writer(s)	Original album	Length
1.	"Wake Up"	Hilary Duff; Dead Executives		3:38
2.	"Beat of My Heart"	Hilary Duff; Dead Executives		3:09
3.	"Break My Heart"	Hilary Duff; Dead Executives		3:21
4.	"Why Not" (Remix 2005)	Charlie Midnight; Matthew Gerrard	The Lizzie McGuire Movie, 2003^{[b]}	2:59
5.	"So Yesterday"	Midnight; Lauren Christy; Scott Spock; Graham Edwards	Metamorphosis, 2003	3:35
6.	"Come Clean" (Remix 2005)	Kara DioGuardi; John Shanks	Metamorphosis^{[a]}	3:44
7.	"Party Up" (Remix 2005)	Ashley Hamilton; Taylor Laurence Rhodes; Meredith Ann Brooks	Metamorphosis^{[b]}	3:56
8.	"Our Lips Are Sealed" (with Haylie Duff)	Jane Wiedlin; Terence Hall	A Cinderella Story, 2004	2:40
9.	"Fly"	DioGuardi; Shanks	Hilary Duff, 2004	3:43
10.	"Someone's Watching Over Me"	DioGuardi; Shanks	Hilary Duff	4:11
11.	"Girl Can Rock"	Midnight; Denny Weston Jr.	Metamorphosis^{[b]}	3:04
12.	"Rock This World" (Remix 2005)	Midnight; Weston; Hilary Duff; Ty Stevens	Hilary Duff^{[b]}	3:58
13.	"Supergirl" (bonus track)	DioGuardi; Greg Wells		2:53

The Collector's Signature Edition
No.	Title	Writer(s)	Original album	Length
1.	"Wake Up"	Hilary Duff; Dead Executives		3:38
2.	"The Getaway"	Julian Bunetta; James Michael	Hilary Duff, 2004	3:37
3.	"Beat of My Heart"	Hilary Duff; Dead Executives		3:09
4.	"Come Clean" (Remix 2005)	Kara DioGuardi; John Shanks	Metamorphosis, 2003^{[a]}	3:44
5.	"Who's That Girl?" (Acoustic Version)	Charlie Midnight; Desmond Child; Andreas Carlsson	Hilary Duff	3:26
6.	"Mr. James Dean"	Hilary Duff; Haylie Duff; Kevin De Clue	Hilary Duff	3:29
7.	"So Yesterday"	Midnight; Lauren Christy; Scott Spock; Graham Edwards	Metamorphosis	3:35
8.	"Metamorphosis"	Hilary Duff; Midnight; Chico Bennett; Andre Recke	Metamorphosis	3:28
9.	"Rock This World" (Remix 2005)	Hilary Duff; Midnight; Denny Weston Jr.; Stevens	Hilary Duff^{[b]}	3:58
10.	"Break My Heart"	Hilary Duff; Dead Executives		3:21
11.	"Jericho" (Remix 2005)	Midnight; Bennett	Hilary Duff^{[b]}	3:50
12.	"Fly"	DioGuardi; Shanks	Hilary Duff	3:43
13.	"Supergirl"	DioGuardi; Greg Wells		2:53
14.	"Party Up" (Remix 2005)	Ashley Hamilton; Taylor Laurence Rhodes; Meredith Ann Brooks	Metamorphosis^{[b]}	3:56
15.	"Girl Can Rock"	Midnight; Weston	Metamorphosis^{[b]}	3:04
16.	"Our Lips Are Sealed"	Jane Wiedlin; Terence Hall	A Cinderella Story, 2004	2:40
17.	"Why Not" (Remix 2005)	Midnight; Matthew Gerrard	The Lizzie McGuire Movie, 2003^{[b]}	2:59
Total length:				58:30

US Target edition bonus track
No.	Title	Writer(s)	Original album	Length
18.	"Do You Want Me?" (AOL session)	DioGuardi; Gerrard	Hilary Duff^{[b]}	3:44
Total length:				62:14

Japanese edition bonus tracks
No.	Title	Length
18.	"Wake Up" (DJ Kaya Long-T Remix)	5:29
19.	"Wake Up" (DJ Kaya Dance Remix)	4:17
Total length:		68:16

Japanese deluxe edition DVD
No.	Title	Length
1.	"Wake Up" (Music video)
2.	"So Yesterday" (Music video)
3.	"Why Not" (Music video)
4.	"Come Clean" (Music video)
5.	"Our Lips Are Sealed" (Music video)
6.	"Learning to Fly"
7.	"Making of Hilary's Interview in L.A. 2003"
8.	"Making of Japan Promotion Tour 2003"
9.	"Making of Japan Promotion Tour 2004"
10.	"Making of Hilary's Interview in Toronto 2005"
11.	"Making of 'Wake Up'"

Notes

- ^{^[a]}"Come Clean (Remix 2005)" was previously included on single releases of "Come Clean" under the title "Come Clean (Flood Remix Radio)".
- ^{^[b]}These tracks are previously unreleased. The original version appears on a previous release.
- The version of "Girl Can Rock" on Most Wanted is an alternate mix. The original version appears as a Target bonus track on ''Metamorphosis'' and later included on the soundtrack of ''A Cinderella Story''.

== Personnel ==
Credits adapted from the liner notes of the album

- Hilary Duff – vocals & executive production (all tracks)
- Andre Recke – executive production (all tracks); production & mixing (track 5)
- Dead Executives – production, engineering, mixing & bass guitar (track 1, 3, 9)
- Julian Bunetta – production (track 2)
- The Matrix – production (track 2, 6); mixing, arrangement & recording (track 6)
- John Shanks – production (track 4, 10); mixing (track 10)
- Haylie Duff – production (track 5)
- Kevin De Clue – production (track 5)
- Chico Bennett – production (track 7)
- Charlie Midnight – production (track 7, 8, 11, 12)
- Denny Weston Jr. – production (track 8, 11)
- Ty Stevens – production (track 8)
- Spider – production (track 12)
- Matthew Gerrard – production & remix (track 13)
- Chris Cox – remix (track 4)
- Dean Butterworth – drums (track 1, 3, 9)
- Monique Powell – background vocals (track 1, 3, 9)
- The Fruit – background vocals (track 1, 3, 9)
- Todd Parker – engineering (track 1, 3, 9)
- Grant Conway – engineering (track 1, 3, 9)
- Allan Hessler – engineering assistance (track 1, 3, 9)
- Joe Gastwirt – mastering (track 1, 3, 9)
- Stephen Marcussen – mastering (track 2, 5, 6, 8, 10)
- Joel Soyffer – mastering (track 7, 11, 12); remix (track 8)
- Eric Sarafin – mixing (track 2)
- Jeff Rothschild – mixing (track 10)
- Jay Landers – executive production (2, 4, 5–8, 10–12)

== Charts ==
=== Weekly charts ===
Chart (2005–2006)	Peak position
Australian Albums (ARIA)	3
Austrian Albums (Ö3 Austria)	72
Canadian Albums (Billboard)	1
Dutch Albums (Album Top 100)	51
European Albums (Billboard)	59
Irish Albums (IRMA)	8
Italian Albums (FIMI)	6
Japanese Albums (Oricon)	3
Mexican Albums (AMPROFON)	25
New Zealand Albums (RMNZ)	10
Scottish Albums (Official Charts)	25
South African Albums (RISA)	9
Spanish Albums (Promusicae)	43
Swiss Albums (Schweizer Hitparade)	69
UK Albums (Official Charts)	31
US Billboard 200	1

=== Year-end charts ===
Chart (2005)	Position
Australian Albums (ARIA)	53
Italian Albums (FIMI)	91
Mexican Albums (AMPROFON)	74
US Billboard 200	86
Worldwide Albums (IFPI)	50

Chart (2006)	Position
Italian Albums (FIMI)	27
South African Albums (RISA)	18
US Billboard 200	104

== Certifications ==
Region	Certification	Certified units/sales
Australia (ARIA)	Platinum	70,000^{^}
Canada (Music Canada)	2× Platinum	200,000^{^}
Ireland (IRMA)	Gold	7,500^{^}
Japan (RIAJ)	Gold	100,000^{^}
Mexico (AMPROFON)	Gold	50,000^{^}
New Zealand (RMNZ)	Gold	7,500^{‡}
Spain (Promusicae)	Gold	50,000^{^}
United Kingdom (BPI)	Gold	100,000^{^}
United States (RIAA)	Platinum	1,000,000^{^}
Summaries
Worldwide	—	2,200,000
^{^} Shipments figures based on certification alone.^{‡} Sales+streaming figures based on certification alone.

== Release history ==
Country	Date	Edition	Label	Ref.
Japan	August 10, 2005	Standard (CD); limited (CD+DVD)	Avex Trax	
Canada	August 16, 2005	Standard; collector's (CD)	Universal	
United States	August 16, 2005	Standard; collector's (CD)	Hollywood	
Italy	October 28, 2005	Standard (CD)	Virgin	
United Kingdom	October 31, 2005	Standard (CD)	Angel	
Germany	November 18, 2005	Standard (CD)	EMI	
Poland	November 28, 2005	Standard (CD)	EMI	
Denmark	November 30, 2005	Standard (CD)	EMI	
