= Learning to fly =

Learning to fly or learn to fly may refer to:

- Fledging, a bird, bat or other flighted creature learning how to fly
- Flight training, in which a person takes lessons to fly an aircraft such as a helicopter or fixed-wing aircraft

== Music ==
- "Learn to Fly", a 1999 song by Foo Fighters
- "Learn to Fly" (A1 song), 2002
- "Learn to Fly", a 2020 song by Elton John and Surfaces off the album The Lockdown Sessions
- "Learn to Fly", a 2009 song by Greek stoner rock band Nightstalker off the album Superfreak
- "Learning to Fly" (Pink Floyd song), a 1987 song by Pink Floyd
- "Learning to Fly", a 1986 song by Emerson, Lake & Powell from the album Emerson, Lake & Powell
- "Learning to Fly" (Tom Petty and the Heartbreakers song), a 1991 song by Tom Petty and the Heartbreakers
- "Learning to Fly" (Christina Aguilera song), 2023

== Other ==
- Learning to Fly, the 2001 autobiography of singer Victoria Beckham
- Learning to Fly (video), Hilary Duff's third video album
