= A Cinderella Story (soundtrack) =

Soundtrack album by Various artists
- Released: July 13, 2004
- Genre: Pop
- Length: 48:23
- Label: Hollywood
- Producers: Chico Bennett; Julian Bunetta; Desmond Child; Andy Dodd; Sherry Kondor; Ginger McCartney; Charlie Midnight; Charlton Pettus; Spider; Adam Watts; Denny Weston Jr.

Singles from A Cinderella Story
- 1. "Our Lips Are Sealed" Released: June 5, 2004

A Cinderella Story is a soundtrack album to the 2004 film of the same name. It was released on July 13, 2004, by Hollywood Records. It includes 3 new songs by Hilary Duff including the single, a cover of "Our Lips Are Sealed" with her sister Haylie Duff. It also includes 2 of her songs, one from her 2003 album Metamorphosis which is "Anywhere But Here" and one from her 2005 released album ‘’Most Wanted’’ "Girl Can Rock", which was a bonus track.

== Singles ==
"Our Lips Are Sealed" was released as the only single from the soundtrack on June 5, 2004. As of July 27, 2014, the song had sold 161,000 copies in the United States.

== Critical response ==
Professional ratings
Review scores
Source	Rating
AllMusic	3/5 stars

Heather Phares of AllMusic gave a positive review of the soundtrack, awarding it three out of five stars. She praised Duff's songs, noting that they "display a little more edge and depth while still remaining appropriate for a teen pop singer like Duff and her audience," and added that they were complemented by the contributions from other artists. She claimed that Duff contributing to the majority of the album would "tide [her] fans over" before the release of her eponymous third album. Phares finalized her review stating, "A Cinderella Story is an admittedly lightweight but solidly entertaining soundtrack that delivers exactly what its audience wants from it."

== Track listing ==
A Cinderella Story track listing
No.	Title	Writer(s)	Producer(s)	Length
1.	"Our Lips Are Sealed" (Hilary Duff and Haylie Duff)	Jane Wiedlin; Terry Hall	Charlie Midnight; Spider; Andre Recke^{[a]}; Jay Landers^{[a]}; Jon Lind^{[a]}	2:40
2.	"Anywhere But Here" (Hilary Duff)	James Marr; Wendy Page; Chico Bennett	Bennett	3:31
3.	"The Best Day of My Life" (Jesse McCartney)	David Katz; Robert Palmer; Lindy Robbins	Charlton Pettus; Sherry Kondor^{[b]}; Ginger McCartney^{[b]}; Landers^{[a]}	3:13
4.	"Girl Can Rock" (Hilary Duff)	Midnight; Denny Weston Jr.	Midnight; Weston Jr.; Recke^{[a]}; Landers^{[a]}	3:10
5.	"Now You Know" (Hilary Duff)	Kara DioGuardi; Pettus; Michelle Lewis	Pettus; Recke^{[a]}; Landers^{[a]}	3:39
6.	"One in This World" (Haylie Duff)	Diane Warren	Midnight; Spider; Recke^{[a]}; Landers^{[a]}; Lind^{[a]}	4:11
7.	"Crash World" (Hilary Duff)	Desmond Child; Andreas Carlsson; Julian Bunetta	Child; Midnight; Bunetta; Recke^{[a]}; Landers^{[a]}	3:00
8.	"To Make You Feel My Love" (Josh Kelley)	Bob Dylan	Pettus	3:32
9.	"Sympathy" (Goo Goo Dolls)	John Rzeznik		2:48
10.	"Friend" (Kaitlyn)	Kaitlyn Harner; Johnny Douglas		3:49
11.	"Beautiful Soul" (Cinderella mix) (Jesse McCartney)	Andy Dodd; Adam Watts	Watts; Dodd; Kondor; G. McCartney	3:57
12.	"I'll Be" (Edwin McCain)	McCain		4:28
13.	"Fallen" (Mýa)	Richard Shelton; Kevin Veney; Loren Hill; Leonard Huggins; Luis Bonfa; Maria Toledo		3:24
14.	"First Day of the Rest of Your Life" (MxPx)	Michael Herrera		3:01
Total length:				48:23

Target bonus track
No.	Title	Length
15.	"Metamorphosis" (live) (Hilary Duff)	3:16
Total length:		51:39

Notes

- ^{^a} signifies an executive producer
- ^{^b} signifies a vocal producer and executive producer

== Charts ==
=== Weekly charts ===
Chart (2004)	Peak position
Australian Albums (ARIA)	37
Canadian Albums (Billboard)	3
US Billboard 200	9
US Soundtrack Albums (Billboard)	1

=== Year-end charts ===
Chart (2004)	Position
US Billboard 200	172
US Soundtrack Albums (Billboard)	10

== Certifications ==
Region	Certification	Certified units/sales
United States (RIAA)	Gold	500,000^{^}
^{^} Shipments figures based on certification alone.

== Release history ==
Release dates and formats for A Cinderella Story
Region	Date	Format	Label	Ref.
Canada	July 13, 2004	CD	Universal	
United States	July 13, 2004	CD	Hollywood	
United Kingdom	August 23, 2004	CD	Warner	
Australia	September 13, 2004	CD	Festival Mushroom	
Japan	November 3, 2004	CD	Avex Trax	
