= Raise Your Voice =

2004 film by Sean McNamara

- Theatrical release poster
- Directed by: Sean McNamara
- Screenplay by: Sam Schreiber
- Story by: Mitch Rotter
- Produced by: Anthony Rhulen; A.J. Dix; David Brookwell; Sean McNamara; Sara Risher
- Starring: Hilary Duff; Rita Wilson; David Keith; Jason Ritter; Oliver James; Rebecca De Mornay; John Corbett
- Cinematography: John R. Leonetti
- Edited by: Jeff W. Canavan
- Music by: Aaron Zigman
- Production companies: Brookwell McNamara Entertainment; FilmEngine
- Distributed by: New Line Cinema
- Release date: October 8, 2004
- Running time: 103 minutes; 107 minutes (extended cut)
- Country: United States
- Language: English
- Budget: $15 million
- Box office: $14.9 million

Raise Your Voice is a 2004 American teen musical drama film directed by Sean McNamara and starring Hilary Duff. The film follows a small-town girl with a passion for singing who secretly travels to Los Angeles to attend a prestigious summer music program at a performing arts academy after the death of her brother. The film received negative reviews and grossed $14.9 million against a $15 million budget.

Three songs by Duff were featured in Raise Your Voice, all of which appear on her eponymous third album. "Someone's Watching Over Me" is performed by her character during the film's climax. Canadian rock band Three Days Grace makes a cameo appearance in the film, performing the songs "Are You Ready" and "Home".

== Plot ==
Terri Fletcher is a Flagstaff, Arizona teenager who dreams of becoming a professional singer. She wants to participate in a music program that could give her a $10,000 scholarship. Her overprotective father Simon, a second-generation restaurateur, disapproves of Terri's plans, wanting her to run the family business.

Terri is very close to her elder brother Paul, who supports her dream. At Paul's graduation-day barbecue, he has a fight with Simon and is grounded. That night, Terri sneaks Paul out of the house to attend a Three Days Grace concert. On their way home, they are hit by a drunk driver, killing Paul.

Terri blames herself for Paul's death and decides to quit singing, but her mother Frances says that Paul's death is not her fault, and that Paul would have wanted Terri to attend the program. She eventually convinces Terri to go, telling Simon that Terri plans to stay with her aunt Nina in Palm Desert, California for the summer while she actually goes to Los Angeles.

Terri arrives in Los Angeles and has a few difficulties: her jacket is stolen, her cab driver is crabby, and initially can't get into the music school. While in the program, Terri makes new friends, including fun-loving DJ Kiwi, quiet pianist Sloane, and talented violinist Denise. Terri learns a great deal about music but has flashbacks of the car crash.

Terri also develops a mutual fondness for British songwriter Jay, but she faces competition from Robin Childers, who was with Jay the previous summer. Robin still harbors feelings for Jay, but he does not reciprocate. Jay tries to get Robin to leave him and Terri alone. On one occasion, Robin kisses Jay just as Terri walks in. Jay pushes Robin away, but Terri runs off in tears, ignoring Jay's insistence that the kiss meant nothing. Later, finding him drunk, Terri and Denise take Jay to the roof to sober up. When he does, Jay apologizes, and Terri agrees to finish the song they have been working on for the scholarship contest.

In the meantime, Simon learns of Terri's ruse, and drives to Los Angeles to bring her home. On the final day, Simon comes to the school and chastises Terri for deceiving him, as well as accuses her of turning his sister and wife against him, but Terri begs her father not to make same mistake he did with Paul and make her run, and not ruin the summer. Ultimately, realizing how selfish he had been, Simon changes his mind.

Terri and Jay perform the song they wrote ("Someone's Watching Over Me"), dedicating it to Paul. Even though Denise wins the scholarship prize, Simon is proud of his daughter and her talents, and is also glad that her last memory of Paul is one worth having (the concert), as opposed to Simon's own (their argument). Terri's teachers hope to see her next year; Simon replies that they just might. The students perform together.

== Cast ==
- Hilary Duff as Teresa "Terri" Fletcher
- Oliver James as Jay Corgan
- Lauren Mayhew as Robin Childers
- Rebecca De Mornay as Aunt Nina Fletcher
- Rita Wilson as Frances Fletcher
- David Keith as Simon Fletcher
- Dana Davis as Denise
- Johnny Lewis as Kiwi
- Kat Dennings as Sloane
- Jason Ritter as Paul Fletcher
- James Avery as Mr. Gantry
- John Corbett as Mr. Torvald
- Robert Trebor as Mr. Wesson
- Sean McNamara as Mr. Farley
- Davida Williams as Lauren

== Production ==
Principal photography began in Los Angeles in January 2004, and ended the following April.

== Reception ==
=== Box office ===
Raise Your Voice grossed $10.4 million in the United States and Canada, and $4.5 million in other territories, for a worldwide total of $14.9 million. The film opened on October 8, 2004, and grossed $4,022,693 on its opening weekend, finishing at number six behind Shark Tale, Friday Night Lights, Ladder 49, Taxi, and The Forgotten.

=== Critical response ===
On the review aggregator website Rotten Tomatoes, the film holds an approval rating of 16% based on 83 reviews, with an average rating of 3.8/10. The website's critics consensus reads, "A bland, formulaic tween version of Fame." On Metacritic, the film has a score of 33 out of 100 based on reviews from 24 critics, indicating "generally unfavorable" reviews.

=== Accolades ===
Raise Your Voice was nominated for an Artios Award for Outstanding Casting in Children's Programming Casting and a Golden Reel Award for Best Sound Editing in a Feature Film - Music/Musical.

== Home media ==
The film was released on VHS and DVD on February 15, 2005.

== Soundtrack ==
Hilary Duff contributed three songs to Raise Your Voice, all of which appear on her eponymous third album. "Someone's Watching Over Me" is performed by her character during the climax of the film, and a performance of "Jericho" plays during the film's ending credits. The single "Fly" also appears in the film. Three Days Grace contributed the songs "Are You Ready" and "Home" to the film, the latter from their self-titled debut album.
