= Learning to Fly (video) =

Video by Hilary Duff
- Released: November 16, 2004
- Recorded: 2004
- Genre: Pop rock
- Length: 31:48
- Label: Hollywood
- Producer: Abbey Konowitch (exec.); David Snow (exec.)

Hilary Duff video chronology
The Girl Can Rock (2004)	Learning to Fly (2004)	4Ever Hilary Duff (2006)

Learning to Fly: Creating the Video and Concert, commonly referred to as Learning to Fly, is the third long-form video by American singer Hilary Duff. It was released on November 16, 2004, by Hollywood Records. The DVD takes a behind-the-scenes look at the making of Duff's "Fly" music video filmed at Worcester's Centrum Centre in Worcester, Massachusetts during rehearsal for her Most Wanted Tour. At the end of the DVD, the "Fly" music video is also featured. Prior to its DVD release in November, the production aired as a television special on Nickelodeon on September 26, 2004, in promotion of Duff's self-titled album released two days later in the United States.

Professional ratings
Review scores
Source	Rating
Allmusic	3.5/5 stars

== Track listing ==
No.	Title	Length
1.	"Learning to Fly" (documentary)	27:08
2.	"Fly" (music video)	4:40
Total length:		31:48

== Charts ==
Chart (2004)	Peak position
US Top Music Videos (Billboard)	17

== Certifications ==
Region	Certification	Certified units/sales
Australia (ARIA)	Gold	7,500^{^}
^{^} Shipments figures based on certification alone.

== Release history ==
Release dates and formats for Learning to Fly
Region	Date	Format	Label	Ref.
Canada	November 16, 2004	DVD	Universal	
United States	November 16, 2004	DVD	Hollywood	
Australia	January 24, 2005	DVD	Festival Mushroom	
