= Beat of My Heart =

2005 single by Hilary Duff

Single by Hilary Duff

from the album Most Wanted
- Released: December 11, 2005
- Recorded: 2005
- Studio: Foxy (Los Angeles, California)
- Genre: Electropop
- Length: 3:09
- Label: Hollywood
- Songwriters: Dead Executives; Hilary Duff
- Producer: Dead Executives

Hilary Duff singles chronology
| "Wake Up" (2005) | "Beat of My Heart" (2005) | "Play with Fire" (2006) |

Australian single cover

Music video
- "Beat of My Heart" on YouTube

"Beat of My Heart" is a song by American actress and singer Hilary Duff from her first compilation album, Most Wanted (2005). She co-wrote the track with its producers Dead Executives, a record production team consisting of Jason Epperson, Joel and Benji Madden. Along with the three other new songs on Most Wanted, "Beat of My Heart" was crafted with the intention of having a "totally different sound" from Duff's previous material. It is an up-tempo new wave-inspired electropop song that incorporates elements of bubblegum pop in its production. Lyrically, "Beat of My Heart" can be interpreted in many ways. For Duff, it tells the story of a woman "com[ing] out of her shell again" after a bad break-up.

Following the success of previous single, "Wake Up", "Beat of My Heart" was issued as the second international single from Most Wanted. It was released in Australia by Festival Mushroom Records on December 11, 2005, and in several European countries on March 6, 2006, by Angel Records. The single achieved moderate commercial success, charting in four countries. Its highest position was in Italy, where it peaked at number eight. It reached the top 20 in Australia and Spain, and secured a position towards the lower end of the chart in Switzerland. Critical reception of "Beat of My Heart" was generally mixed, with some critics pointing out its repetitive and childish nature, while others commended it for its sound.

The accompanying music video for "Beat of My Heart" was directed by Phil Harder. The music video, which paid homage to Bond girls, debuted a "more mature" image of Duff. It emulates the title sequences of James Bond films from the 1960s to 2000s, high-tech 3D designs. Duff has performed "Beat of My Heart" live on all of her concert tours since its inception. A pre-recorded performance of the song was played during the 2006 edition of Dick Clark's New Year's Rockin' Eve, which would later become a regular feature during future editions of the program.

== Background and development ==
On May 20, 2005, MTV News reported that Hilary Duff would be releasing a new album in August, comprising previously released tracks and four new recordings. The following month, in an interview with MTV News, Duff said that she had been working with brothers Joel and Benji Madden, of the American rock band Good Charlotte, and Jason Epperson (together known under the production name the Dead Executives) to write and produce new songs for the compilation. She said that " ... they're three of my favorite songs I've ever done. ... It was really fun being in the studio with them." Described by Duff as the first time when "all the responsibility was on [her]", she went into the recording studio without the guidance of her record label or management.

According to Duff, she did not tell anyone at her record label that she was working with the Dead Executives. Joel, whom Duff had been dating at the time, was aware that she needed new material for a compilation album, and knew that she wanted a "totally different sound". Together, the Dead Executives went into the recording studio and worked on new music for Duff, before bringing her into the studio to collectively work on them. Duff described working with them as pleasant, and the music as a new milestone in her career, stating that working with "people you're close with makes a world of difference when you're recording and being creative." At the same time, Duff was also nervous about how her fans would react to the new music. Duff recorded four tracks for the album, three of which were co-written and produced with the Dead Executives.

For Duff, who stated that the song can be interpreted in many ways, "Beat of My Heart" tells the story of a heterosexual relationship, in which the woman was in love with the man, but he was not "as into her as she was him". After the couple broke up, she found herself in a place where she "wasn't herself". She then "comes out of her shell again", which Duff described as: "Coming out again, dancing again, smiling again, having fun and seeing everything in a brighter light." The Dead Executives were instrumental in the instrumentation of "Beat of My Heart", performing on the bass and guitars. They also mixed and engineered the song; the latter was also conducted by Todd Parker and Grant Conway and assisted by Allan Hessler. It was mixed and recorded at the Foxy Studio in Los Angeles, California. The drums featured on the track was performed by Dean Butterworth while Monique Powell and The Fruit performed backing vocals. The song was then mastered by Joe Gastwirt.

== Composition ==
"Beat of My Heart" is an up-tempo new wave-inspired electropop song that incorporates elements of bubblegum pop and dance music in its production. It contains a "soft electronic pop" sound and has the heart beat sound as its base, as well as guitar strums at a "feverish pace" throughout the song. Spence D. of IGN described "Beat of My Heart" as a "glorious uninhibited slab of Euro pop as filtered through the vocal chords of a warm-blooded American girl."

"Beat of My Heart" opens with the sound of a beating heart. In the pre-chorus, Duff's vocals are made distant by the song's use of guitars and synth keyboards. She sings that she is going to follow her own interests: "To the beat of my / To the beat of my / To the beat of my heart". In the first verse, a disinterested Duff sings that she is eager to speak her mind and "yield to her every desire". In the chorus, she sings that her confidence has strained her relationships with her friends. In the second verse, she sings of being over her depression. An "angry guitar" and a "goth piano" interrupts the song in its bridge. Duff sings that she is only listening to herself from now on. According to Chuck Taylor of Billboard magazine, the line "beat of my heart" is repeated forty-four times in the song.

== Critical response ==
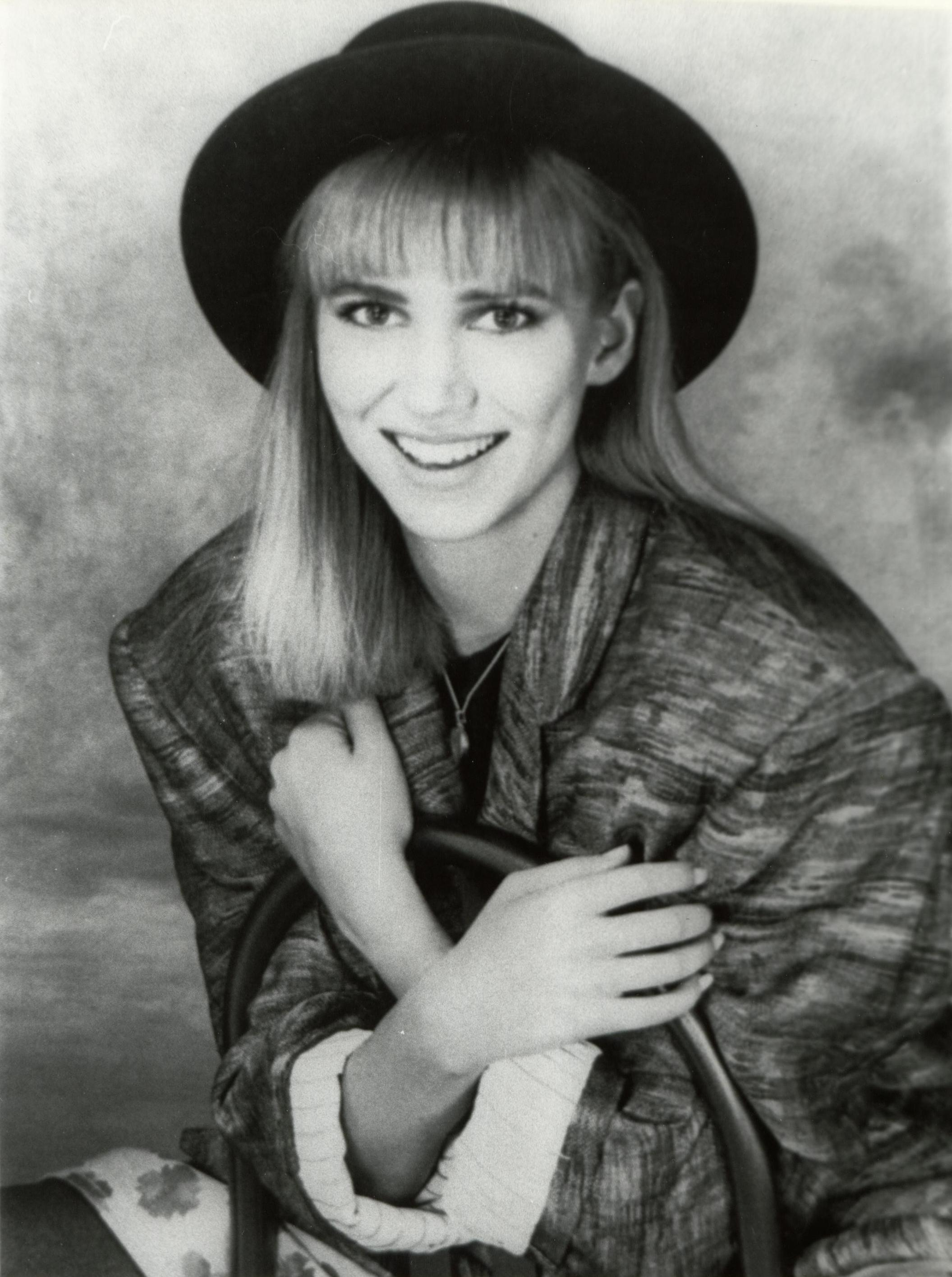
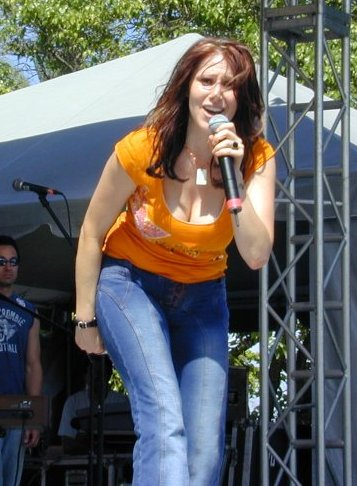
"Beat of My Heart" received comparisons to the music of American singers Debbie Gibson (left) and Tiffany Darwish (right).

"Beat of My Heart" received generally mixed reviews from music critics. Pam Avoledo of Blogcritics wrote that Duff sounds like she is bored and "going through the motions" on the song. She further stated that Duff has "lost her sauciness and ironically, her spunk" in the song. Avoledo concluded her review by calling "the bland electro pop" song an "insult to the genre. It's like spilling ramen on a Vivenne Westwood evening gown." A reviewer from CBBC Newsround commented that the song is so repetitive that you will feel like "you've listened to it 20 times after just one play". The reviewer praised the heartbeat present on the track, writing that it "make it a bit of a foot-tapper", but deemed the lyrics to be "meaningless". The reviewer concluded that: "You'll find yourself humming it but will be hard pushed to remember what on earth she was singing about!" Spence D. of IGN wrote that "Beat of My Heart" does not try for subtlety as it utilizes the "much overused heartbeat" for the "foundation rhythm" of the song.

A reviewer for Billboard noted that the song "seems to toss her back to her Disney days". They concluded that: "Pop music is always appreciated, but this is a kiddie anthem, plain and simple [...] it is hardly a contender for contemporary radio". Bill Lamb of About.com found the song, along with "Break My Heart", to be "disappointing cookie cutter copies" of Avril Lavigne's "Sk8er Boi". He stated that although the songs are "easy to listen", they "break no new ground". Gabriel Leong of MTV Asia stated that "Beat of My Heart" sounds "very much like" songs that Debbie Gibson, Tiffany Darwish and Bananarama would have recorded in 1980s, a direction that suits Duff "much better than the whole budding rock chick image she's been trying out."

== Commercial performance ==
"Beat of My Heart" was a moderate commercial success. The single managed to chart in four countries, reaching its highest position in Italy, where it peaked at number eight on the week ending on April 6, 2006, after debuting at number ten. In Australia, "Beat of My Heart" outperformed "Wake Up" by reaching number 13; it stayed on the chart for a total 14 weeks. The song gained lower positions in Spain, where it managed to peak inside the top twenty by reaching number 17; and in Switzerland, where it reached number 89. In 2006, "Beat of My Heart" was placed at number 90 on the Australian year-end singles chart, and at number 74 on the year-end Australian Physical Singles chart.

== Promotion ==
=== Music video ===
The music video for "Beat of My Heart" was shot in Los Angeles, California on the week of September 26, 2005. It was directed by Phil Harder for Harder/Fuller Films. The video, which pays homage to Bond girls, contains "that hip sensibility" of James Bond films and presents a "more mature" image of Duff. A representative for Duff's record label said that: "She's always been a huge James Bond fan. She watched those movies with her sister growing up, and she loved the Bond girls, because they were always so stylish, and she's stylish." The music video was made available to purchase on the iTunes Store from November 2, 2005. It later made its on-air premiere on MTV's Total Request Live a week later, on November 9.

The music video emulates the title sequences of Bond films from the 1960s to the 2000s, high-tech 3D designs. In the opening sequence, one of the graphics turns into a wire frame of a beating electronic heart, which "pulls out" with each beat. As the camera zooms, the heart grows in size and "weaves" to become Duff. According to MTV News, while she does not "take on" Pussy Galore, Plenty O'Toole, Holly Goodhead, or any other Bond girl, she becomes a "Bond girl in spirit", switching from era to era with different looks, with her hair blowing and flying around in graphic silhouettes. Instead of cutting from image to image, the shots evolve in a Bond-like style "as shapes take on different forms to reveal something else". Duff performs in silhouette, with a microphone, "where a gun would otherwise be". In another shot, her band is a silhouette. The edition of the video is matched to the beat of the song, "zapping the view in and out, until a lull in the song, when the view travels back into her eyes, through her skin and back to her beating heart."

=== Live performances ===
Duff premiered "Beat of My Heart" as part of the set list of the Still Most Wanted Tour, which commenced on July 12, 2005, in Los Angeles. She performed “Beat of My Heart” at American Music Awards of 2005 on November 22, 2005. She co-hosted the 2006 edition of Dick Clark's New Year's Rockin' Eve. A pre-recorded performance of "Beat of My Heart" was played during the program. Duff performed the song as part of the set list of the Dignity World Tour (2007–2008).

== Track listings ==
- Australian CD single
1. "Beat of My Heart" — 3:10
2. "Wake Up" (DJ Kaya Dance Remix) — 4:10
- European CD single
1. "Beat of My Heart" (Album Version) — 3:10
2. "Fly" (Remix) — 3:27
- Spanish CD maxi single
1. "Beat of My Heart" (Album Version) — 3:10
2. "Beat of My Heart" (Sugarcookie Remix) — 2:58
3. "Fly" (Remix) — 3:27
- Digital download
1. "Beat of My Heart" — 3:10

== Credits and personnel ==
Credits adapted from the liner notes of "Beat of My Heart" CD single.

- Songwriting – Hilary Duff, Dead Executives
- Production, mixing, bass and guitar – Dead Executives
- Executive producers – Hilary Duff, Andre Recke
- Engineering – Dead Executives, Todd Parker, Grant Conway
- Assistant engineering – Allan Hessler
- Drums – Dean Butterworth
- Mastering – Joe Gastwirt
- Background vocals – Monique Powell, Fruit
- Recorded and mixed at Foxy Studio in Los Angeles, California

== Charts ==
=== Weekly charts ===
| Chart (2006) | Peak position |
|---|---|
| Australia (ARIA) | 13 |
| Italy (FIMI) | 8 |
| Spain (Promusicae) | 17 |
| Switzerland (Schweizer Hitparade) | 89 |

=== Year-end charts ===
| Chart (2006) | Position |
|---|---|
| Australia (ARIA) | 90 |
| Australia Physical Singles (ARIA) | 74 |
| Italy (FIMI) | 50 |

== Release history ==
| Country | Date | Format | Label |
|---|---|---|---|
| Australia | December 11–12, 2005 | CD single | Festival Mushroom |
| Austria | March 6, 2006 | Digital download | Angel |
| France | March 6, 2006 | Digital download | Angel |
| Germany | March 6, 2006 | Digital download | Angel |
| Italy | March 6, 2006 | Digital download | Angel |
| Norway | March 6, 2006 | Digital download | Angel |
| Italy | March 8, 2006 | CD single | Virgin |
| Germany | March 31, 2006 | CD single | Angel |
