= Santa Claus Lane =

Studio album by Hilary Duff
- Released: October 15, 2002
- Recorded: 2002
- Genres: Pop; pop rock; dance-pop
- Length: 33:29
- Label: Buena Vista
- Producers: Alain Bertoni; Chico Bennett; Matthew Gerrard; Chris Hamm; Charlton Pettus; Charlie Midnight; Denny Weston, Jr.

Hilary Duff chronology
Santa Claus Lane (2002)	Metamorphosis (2003)

Singles from Santa Claus Lane
- 1. "Santa Claus Lane" Released: December 2, 2002; 2. "Tell Me a Story" Released: December 2, 2002

Santa Claus Lane is the debut studio album by American singer Hilary Duff. It was released in the United States on October 15, 2002, by Buena Vista Records. The Christmas album contains covers of songs, including "Santa Claus Is Coming to Town", "Jingle Bell Rock" "Wonderful Christmastime", "Sleigh Ride", and "Last Christmas". The album also features guest appearances from Christina Milian, Romeo Miller and Hilary's older sister Haylie Duff.

Santa Claus Lane peaked at number two on US Billboard Top Heatseekers and Top Kid Audio charts and peaked at number 154 on the US Billboard 200. It has been certified Gold by the Recording Industry Association of America (RIAA) for shipping 500,000 copies to retailers. Elsewhere, the album peaked at numbers 95 and 134 respectively in Canada and Japan. Its title track was featured in the 2002 Christmas comedy film The Santa Clause 2. The song was also released as a single alongside "Tell Me a Story" that December.

== Background and recording ==
In 2001, Duff gained fame through her starring role in the Disney Channel series Lizzie McGuire. She became interested in pursuing a music career after attending a Radio Disney concert in 2001. "There were all these pop acts backstage at the concert," Duff explained. "They were all getting ready backstage and warming up, and I was like, 'I want to do this so bad.'" One day, Duff met Andre Recke, who would soon become her manager. She told him of her interest in becoming a singer and briefly performed for him. This prompted him to tell her, "I want to work with you." Recke said of his encounter with Duff, "When I met Hilary, I knew she had something special. Sometimes you just have that feeling, that, 'Wow, she's a star.'"

Duff's music career began with two soundtrack appearances. In 2002, she appeared on the soundtrack to Lizzie McGuire, performing a cover of Brooke McClymont's "I Can't Wait", and the Walt Disney Records compilation DisneyMania, performing a cover of "The Tiki Tiki Tiki Room". Recke noted of Duff's DisneyMania appearance, "That was the first test to see how her fans would react to her as a singer and not just an actress". Duff stated that she felt Christmas came early for her when she recorded Santa Claus Lane. She continued, "I really loved singing these songs. It was a lot of hard work, but also big fun!"

"I Heard Santa on the Radio" and "Tell Me a Story" are duets with Christina Milian and Lil' Romeo, respectively, and "Same Old Christmas" features Duff's sister Haylie. Santa Claus Lane features production from Matthew Gerrard, Chris Hamm, Alain Bertoni, Charlie Midnight and Chico Bennett; on the 2003 reissue, the bonus track "What Christmas Should Be" is produced by Charlton Pettus. This song was featured on the end credits and soundtrack of her family comedy film Cheaper by the Dozen (2003). Duff later re-recorded "Last Christmas" for her 2026 EP Holiday Things.

== Release and promotion ==
Santa Claus Lane was released in the United States on October 15, 2002, by Walt Disney Records. It was reissued on October 14 of the following year with the bonus track "What Christmas Should Be", and released by Buena Vista Records.

Two singles were released from the album simultaneously on December 2, 2002. "Santa Claus Lane" was sent to pop radio stations, while "Tell Me a Story" was sent to rhythmic and urban radio stations. A music video for "Santa Claus Lane", featuring Duff performing on Disney's Movie Surfers to promote the film The Santa Clause 2, received airplay on Disney Channel. Duff filmed a music video for "Tell Me a Story" with Lil' Romeo which also received heavy rotation on Disney Channel.

== Critical reception ==
Professional ratings
Review scores
Source	Rating
AllMusic	3/5 stars
The Daily Vault	B−

Santa Claus Lane received mixed reviews from music critics. An AllMusic editor gave the album three out of five stars. Jaan Uhelszki, in an editorial review for Amazon, gave Santa Claus Lane a negative review. She wrote the album, consisting mostly of Christmas covers, "add[s] little to the holiday music canon". She also felt that it only "perks up" on songs that feature guest musicians. Kelefa Sanneh of The New York Times joked it was a "concept album" which was "loosely inspired by Saint Nicholas, the fourth-century bishop of Myra." Christopher Thelen gave a more positive review to the album. While writing for the Daily Vault, Thelen gave a B− grade and wrote it "does show there is a voice behind the pretty young face, even if this is a strange place to start one's recording career."

== Commercial performance ==
Santa Claus Lane debuted at number 154 on the Billboard 200, it also peaked in the top 5 at number 2 and 5 respectively on both the Top Heatseekers and Top Holiday Albums charts. On December 9, 2003, the album was certified Gold by the Recording Industry Association of America for 500,000 shipments to retailers. The album reached the 134th position of the Japanese Albums Chart in 2004. As of July 27, 2014, the album had sold 477,000 copies in the United States.

== Track listing ==
No.	Title	Writer(s)	Producer(s)	Length
1.	"Santa Claus Lane"	Matthew Gerrard; Charlie Midnight; Bridget Benenate; Jay Landers	Gerrard	2:42
2.	"Santa Claus Is Coming to Town"	John Frederick Coots; Haven Gillespie	Chris Hamm; Alain Bertoni	3:36
3.	"I Heard Santa on the Radio" (with Christina Milian)	Midnight; Hamm	Hamm; Bertoni	4:02
4.	"Jingle Bell Rock"	Joseph Carleton Beal; James Ross Boothe	Hamm; Bertoni	2:47
5.	"When the Snow Comes Down in Tinseltown"	Midnight	Midnight; Denny Weston, Jr.^{[a]}	3:18
6.	"Sleigh Ride"	Leroy Anderson; Mitchell Parish	Hamm; Bertoni	3:04
7.	"Tell Me a Story (About the Night Before)" (with Lil' Romeo)	Midnight; Chico Bennett; Landers; Master P; Lil' Romeo	Bennett; Midnight	3:40
8.	"Last Christmas"	George Michael	Hamm; Bertoni	4:11
9.	"Same Old Christmas" (featuring Haylie Duff)	Midnight; Marc Swersky	Midnight; Bennett^{[a]}	3:17
10.	"Wonderful Christmastime"	Paul McCartney	Hamm; Bertoni	2:53
Total length:				33:29

2003 reissue
No.	Title	Writer(s)	Producer(s)	Length
1.	"What Christmas Should Be"	Midnight; Gerrard	Charlton Pettus	3:12
2.	"Santa Claus Lane"	Gerrard; Midnight; Benenate; Landers	Gerrard	2:42
3.	"Santa Claus Is Coming to Town"	Coots; Gillespie	Hamm; Bertoni	3:36
4.	"I Heard Santa on the Radio" (with Christina Milian)	Midnight; Hamm	Hamm; Bertoni	4:02
5.	"Jingle Bell Rock"	Beal; Boothe	Hamm; Bertoni	2:47
6.	"When the Snow Comes Down in Tinseltown"	Midnight	Midnight; Weston, Jr.^{[a]}	3:18
7.	"Sleigh Ride"	Anderson; Parish	Hamm; Bertoni	3:04
8.	"Tell Me a Story" (with Lil' Romeo)	Midnight; Bennett; Landers; Master P; Lil' Romeo	Bennett; Midnight	3:40
9.	"Last Christmas"	Michael	Hamm; Bertoni	4:11
10.	"Same Old Christmas" (featuring Haylie Duff)	Midnight; Swersky	Midnight; Bennett^{[a]}	3:17
11.	"Wonderful Christmastime"	McCartney	Hamm; Bertoni	2:53
Total length:				36:42

Notes

- ^{^a} signifies a co-producer

== Personnel ==
Credits for Santa Claus Lane adapted from AllMusic.

- Deborah Araya – Stylist
- Chico Bennett – Producer
- Alain Bertoni – Producer
- Savina Ciaramella – A&R
- J. Fred Coots – Composer
- Matthew Gerrard – Producer
- Haven Gillespie – Composer
- Chris Hamm – Producer
- Martin Häusler – Design
- Jay Landers – Executive producer
- Gavin Lurssen – Mastering
- Dani Markman – Artist coordination
- Charlie Midnight – Producer
- Andre Recke – Executive producer
- Denny Weston Jr. – Producer

== Charts ==
=== Weekly charts ===
Chart (2002–2004)	Peak position
Canadian Albums (Nielsen SoundScan)	95
Japanese Albums (Oricon)	134
US Billboard 200	154
US Heatseekers Albums (Billboard)	2
US Kid Albums (Billboard)	2
US Top Catalog Albums (Billboard)	1
US Top Holiday Albums (Billboard)	5

== Certifications ==
Region	Certification	Certified units/sales
United States (RIAA)	Gold	500,000^{^}
^{^} Shipments figures based on certification alone.

== Release history ==
Country	Date	Format	Label	Ref.
United States	October 15, 2002	CD	Buena Vista	
Canada	October 29, 2002	CD	Universal	
United States	October 24, 2003	CD	Buena Vista	
Japan	November 17, 2004	CD	Avex Trax	
United States	November 6, 2020	LP	Buena Vista	
