= Fly (Hilary Duff song) =

2004 single by Hilary Duff

Single by Hilary Duff

from the album Hilary Duff, Most Wanted, and 4Ever Hilary Duff
- B-side: "Metamorphosis"
- Released: August 10, 2004
- Genre: Pop rock
- Length: 3:43
- Label: Hollywood
- Songwriters: Kara DioGuardi; John Shanks
- Producer: John Shanks

Hilary Duff singles chronology
"Our Lips Are Sealed" (2004)	"Fly" (2004)	"Someone's Watching Over Me" (2005)

Music video
- "Fly" on YouTube

"Fly" is a song recorded by the American singer Hilary Duff for her self-titled third studio album (2004). Kara DioGuardi co-wrote the track with its producer John Shanks. "Fly" was released on August 10, 2004, via Hollywood Records as the album's lead single. It was re-released on March 13, 2006, via Angel Records, in the United Kingdom as the third and final single from Duff's first compilation album, Most Wanted (2005). In Italy, it was re-released via EMI on May 5, 2006, as the lead single from Duff's Italy-exclusive compilation, 4Ever Hilary Duff (2006).

The single received a positive reception from critics. Commercially, it reached the top 30 in Australia, Ireland, Italy, New Zealand, Scotland, and the United Kingdom. An accompanying music video contains rehearsal footage and a live performance of the track.

== Composition ==
The song's protagonist encourages listeners to "let go of your yesterday" and "reach for something when there's nothing left". Hilary Duff has described it as "an uplifting song in the face of all the negativity going around these days. It's about how people are scared to open up and show who they are inside because they're afraid of what others are going to say".

== Critical reception ==
Todd Burns from Stylus Magazine said the song was very similar to Duff's previous single, "Come Clean" (2004), but called it "an easily excusable offense, as it improves on the template ... [it] rightfully leads off the album." Blender magazine said the song is "Urgent and theatrical" and "sounds like Evanescence—but the inspirational lyrics are pure Duff." Chuck Taylor of Billboard responded favorably to "Fly", writing that the song "addresses all that is close to young listeners' hearts...with a sing-along chorus that firmly sticks to the ears." John Shanks received a 2005 Grammy Award for Producer of the Year, Non-Classical for his work on "Fly" and recordings by Ashlee Simpson, Kelly Clarkson, Sheryl Crow, Robbie Robertson and Alanis Morissette.

== Chart performance ==
"Fly" failed to enter the Billboard Hot 100 in the U.S., but peaked at number 29 on Billboard's Mainstream Top 40 chart. As of July 27, 2014, the song had sold 284,000 digital copies in the United States.

== Music video ==
The single's music video, directed by Chris Applebaum, combines black-and-white backstage footage with colorized shots of Duff performing the song live. The video was filmed in Worcester, Massachusetts during rehearsals for her Most Wanted Tour. Footage of the crowd was from the opening night of the tour in Worcester. The video premiered on MTV's Total Request Live on August 26, 2004, debuted on the show's countdown on August 30 and reached number one on the countdown for one day. It spent twenty-eight days on the countdown, until October 27. The making of the video and her tour in Worcester were documented on the 2004 DVD Learning to Fly. The music video is also included as a bonus feature on the Raise Your Voice DVD.

== Live performances ==
Duff performed "Fly" on the 2004 World Music Awards.

== Track listings ==
- Digital download
1. "Fly" – 3:45
- Australian CD single
1. "Fly" – 3:45
2. "Fly" (Remix by Dan Chase) – 3:27
- European CD single
1. "Fly" – 3:44
2. "Fly" (Remix) – 3:44
- UK CD single
1. "Fly" – 3:43
2. "Fly" (Live AOL Session) – 3:44
- UK maxi single
1. "Fly" – 3:43
2. "Metamorphosis" – 3:28
3. "Fly" (Remix) – 3:44
4. "Fly" (Video) – 3:43

== Charts ==
Chart (2004–2006)	Peak position
Australia (ARIA)	21
Belgium (Ultratip Bubbling Under Flanders)	8
Belgium (Ultratip Bubbling Under Wallonia)	11
Canada CHR/Pop Top 30 (Radio & Records)	26
Ireland (IRMA)	10
Italy (FIMI)	13
Netherlands (Dutch Top 40)	36
Netherlands (Single Top 100)	32
New Zealand (Recorded Music NZ)	24
Scottish Singles Sales (Official Charts)	7
UK Singles (Official Charts)	20
US Pop Airplay (Billboard)	29
US CHR/Pop (Radio & Records)	27

== Release history ==
Region	Date	Format	Label(s)	Ref(s).
United States	August 9, 2004	Contemporary hit radio; hot AC radio	Hollywood	
United States	October 19, 2004	Digital download	Hollywood	
Australia	November 8, 2004	CD single	Hollywood; Festival Mushroom	
United Kingdom	March 13, 2006	CD single	Hollywood	
Italy	May 5, 2006	Digital download	EMI	
Canada	May 9, 2006	Digital download	Hollywood	
