= Hilary Duff (album) =

Studio album by Hilary Duff
- Released: September 15, 2004
- Recorded: 2004
- Genres: Pop rock; rock
- Length: 58:50
- Label: Hollywood
- Producers: Chico Bennett; Julian Bunetta; Andreas Carlsson; Desmond Child; "Spider" Ron Entwistle; Kevin De Clue; Haylie Duff; Matthew Gerrard; Jon Lid; Jay Landers; Jim Marr; Charlie Midnight; Wendy Page; Charlton Pettus; Andre Recke; Shaun Shankel; John Shanks; Ty Stevens; Marc Swersky; Denny Weston Jr.

Hilary Duff chronology
Metamorphosis (2003)	Hilary Duff (2004)	Most Wanted (2005)

Singles from Hilary Duff
- 1. "Fly" Released: August 10, 2004; 2. "Someone's Watching Over Me" Released: February 21, 2005

Hilary Duff is the third studio album by American singer-songwriter Hilary Duff. It was released on September 15, 2004, by Hollywood Records. The recording sessions for the seventeen-track album took place in between Duff's filming of Raise Your Voice (2004) and The Perfect Man (2005).

Hilary Duff topped the album charts in Canada while reaching the top 10 in Argentina, Australia, Japan, Malaysia, and the United States. It was number 65 on Billboard magazine's 2005 year-end top albums chart. The album has also received platinum certifications in Australia, Canada, and the United States. It received generally negative reviews from music critics, many of whom compared the album unfavorably to the music of Avril Lavigne and Ashlee Simpson.

The lead single from Hilary Duff, "Fly", premiered on August 26, 2004, on MTV's Total Request Live. It was officially released as a single on August 10, 2004. "Fly" peaked outside the top twenty on the Billboard Top 40 Mainstream chart. A second single, "Someone's Watching Over Me", was released exclusively in Australia on February 21, 2005. The song was released to promote the film Raise Your Voice and charted at number 22 on Australia's ARIA Charts.

== Background and development ==
According to Duff, the album chronicles her experiences over the year before its release: "some of it's good, and some of it's bad, and a lot of it's, like, a big learning experience," she explained. She expressed an interest in recording lyrically more aggressive material than the songs on Metamorphosis (2003) and wanted the album to reflect that, according to her, she is a normal sixteen-year-old. "Well, I'm not going to be singing about lollipops because I no longer relate to lollipops," she said. "Basically, I'm not Lizzie McGuire anymore." She said the album deals with issues she would not discuss publicly and provides "some answers," but she disagreed with people who believed the album presented a different side of her, saying "I think it's just more me this time because I got to really do it how I wanted to." Duff called the album "different [from]" Metamorphosis and "much more mature," particularly in its sound, but not to the point where it would be inappropriate for children: "I just think that other people will relate better." According to her, she was more "involved" compared to the production of her first album and "confident enough to make suggestions" about the style of the album: "If I thought it needed to be more heavy, more rock, I said so."

Three songs — "Fly", "Someone's Watching over Me", and "Jericho" — were used in Raise Your Voice, a film released shortly after the album in which Duff starred as an aspiring singer who attends a prestigious performing arts summer school. Her character performs "Someone's Watching Over Me" during the film's climax and "Jericho" during the end credits. Duff described "Fly" as "an uplifting song" about "how people are scared to open up and show who they are inside because they're afraid of what others are going to say." The album's release in Japan includes three bonus tracks: an acoustic version of "Who's That Girl?", a cover of The Go-Go's' "Our Lips Are Sealed" recorded with Haylie for the soundtrack to Duff's film A Cinderella Story, and a cover of The Who's "My Generation" in which the lyric "I hope I die before I get old" was changed to "I hope I don't die before I get old". Duff began performing it in concert after a suggestion from her manager, who was a fan of the song.

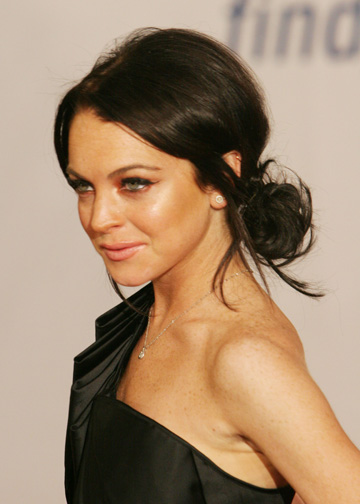
Various publications speculated that Lindsay Lohan was the subject of the song "Haters".

Duff herself co-wrote three tracks on the album: "Mr. James Dean", "Haters" and "Rock This World", the first two of which, along with "The Last Song", Haylie co-wrote. Hilary said she refrained from co-writing the entire album because "I don't know if I'm secure enough with myself to do that." She characterised "Haters" as "tongue-in-cheek" and said people would know what it is about when they heard it, and it attracted substantial publicity when rumors circulated that it was about actress Lindsay Lohan, with whom Duff was alleged to have been feuding. Duff denied that the rumors were true, saying she did not know Lohan and would not write a song about her. She said that at the time she wrote it she was feeling she had to openly discuss her personal life because "people make accusations and there are lies and rumors constantly ... people are so negative. They love to read what's coming out next on Page Six [of the New York Post] and I just felt like it was appropriate." She said she felt "normal girls" could relate to the song because of the "petty stuff" that occurs in schools.

Duff told the Chicago Sun-Times in 2005 that because she was under the control of her record label during the making of Metamorphosis and Hilary Duff, she wasn't able to incorporate the sound she wanted into her recordings. She said the production "[had] been mastered and sounds really pretty", noting: "If I could change it, I would, and it would sound [less pop]. My name is Hilary Duff, and I don't know why I don't get to make Hilary Duff music."

== Recording and production ==
Duff recorded the first three songs for the album between the shooting dates of Raise Your Voice and The Perfect Man, two films in which she was involved. Subsequent songs were recorded on the weekends during filming of The Perfect Man and on the nights after concerts on her summer 2004 tour. The album's outro track, "The Last Song", was recorded in her dressing room.

When discussion regarding her second album began, Duff said she wanted to work with the same team of producers and songwriters with whom she worked on Metamorphosis. "[They] made me feel so comfortable and so secure with myself. I loved working with them. I have a great relationship with them. I talk to them [all the time] ... They knew what was going on in my life, what I was going through ... and how I feel inside," Duff said. For songs she did not co-write, Duff discussed her experiences and feelings with the writers and asked them to write songs about them. Members of the creative team behind Metamorphosis who returned for Hilary Duff include Charlie Midnight, John Shanks and Kara DioGuardi (who collaborated on the commercially released singles), Andre Recke, Marc Swersky, and Duff's sister Haylie. Hilary said, "I do have a lot to say, and I have a lot going on inside that sometimes is buried and hidden because I'm working so hard, and I don't have time to think about it. But if we sit down and we talk about it and I tell her how I feel and she writes, it'll be good."

Several producers and songwriters who did not contribute to Metamorphosis worked on the album, including Andreas Carlsson and Desmond Child ("Who's That Girl?"), British songwriter Guy Chambers ("Shine"), Julian Bunetta and James Michael ("The Getaway"), and Ty Stevens ("Rock This World"). Ron Entwistle is co-writer and co-producer of "Weird", which Duff said is "about someone that she's still obsessed with. And everything he does is like he says this, but he does this ... She's not really sure who he is or what he does, but she likes it." Kevin De Clue contributed to "The Last Song" and "Mr. James Dean" (both co-produced by Haylie), which Duff named her favorite track on the album and described as "very funny"; in the song, she tells an ex-boyfriend that he'll "never be James Dean." Duff neither confirmed nor denied whether the song was about fellow singer Aaron Carter, and she said "it was definitely an experience that I went through that was interesting and I learned a lot from that time in my life." In "Hide Away", co-produced and co-written by Shaun Shankel, Duff discusses a relationship that isn't working because she is in a position where her life is "figuratively under the microscope." Diane Warren wrote "I Am", an empowerment song in which Duff lists positive and negative aspects about herself; she has said it is about being comfortable "with all those feelings ... being who you are." David Campbell arranged and conducted strings for the tracks "Someone's Watching Over Me" and "Who's That Girl?".

Duff's management team considered recording the song "Since U Been Gone" for the album, which Lukasz "Dr. Luke" Gottwald and Max Martin had originally written for Pink. According to Gottwald, Duff's team passed on the song because some of the notes were too high for Duff's voice. "Since U Been Gone" was later recorded by Kelly Clarkson, for whom it became a major hit.

== Singles ==
"Fly" was the lead single from the album. It is also the only single released in the US. The song was released as a single on October 19, 2004; it peaked outside the top twenty on the Billboard Top 40 Mainstream chart but failed to chart on the Billboard Hot 100. The music video was directed by Chris Applebaum and combines black-and-white backstage footage with color shots of Duff performing the song. The video premiered on MTV's Total Request Live on August 26, 2004.

The second and final single, "Someone's Watching Over Me", was released exclusively in Australia on February 21, 2005. The song was released to promote the film Raise Your Voice in which Duff plays the lead role and charted at number 22 on the ARIA Singles Chart. The music video for the song was taken from a performance scene in the film.

Following the album's release, Duff mentioned that she was considering "Haters" and "Weird" as potential singles, however, only the latter was released as a promotional single in Spain in December 2004.

== Promotion ==
Duff embarked on a concert tour of North America, and several of her shows in Canada sold out in minutes. Duff embarked on a two-date tour of Australia in late October, supported by Popstars winner Scott Cain.

== Critical reception ==
Professional ratings
Review scores
Source	Rating
AllMusic	3.5/5 stars
Entertainment Weekly	D−
People	2.5/4 stars
Robert Christgau	(dud)
Slant Magazine	1/5 stars
Stylus	D+
USA Today	2.5/4 stars
The Village Voice	(negative)

The album received generally negative reviews. Ken Barnes of USA Today, which gave Metamorphosis a negative review, commented positively on the album and said it exemplified "a more wholesome brand of rock-flavored pop aimed at teens". Barnes praised the "unstoppably rousing choruses" in some of the songs and said "Duff avoids overextending her thin but pleasant voice, except for a bit of Avrilesque syllable stretching", while he criticised the high number of tracks and the preponderance of "hackneyed self-affirmation messages". AllMusic's Stephen Thomas Erlewine categorised Hilary Duff as "a virtual companion to Ashlee Simpson's Autobiography, from its rock/dance-pop fusion to its earnest demeanor" and "a varied, ambitious album ... it feels like the soundtrack to the life of a smart, ambitious, popular teenager trying to sort things out".

A review of Hilary Duff in The Village Voice was far less praising; it said "Duff's role in the tween-rock firmament is playing pious Lisa Loeb opposite Simpson's post-diluvian Courtney Love ... despite liberal amounts of gold-dust guitar glitter, blow-dried backing vocals, and even the post-crash-Skynyrd 'Rock This World', Hilary Duff is too often the vanilla-bean fantasia AOR chauvinists take all girl-pop for." Stylus magazine wrote that Duff's attempt to follow "the [Avril Lavigne] template that she previously softened" yielded "mixed results ... to a certain extent, [she] is a prisoner of her image and her attempts at Chrissie Hynde-intensity fall far short of even Ashlee Simpson's gravelly vocal cords." Its critic described the album's length as its "simple problem", saying that with "a little quality control ... this could easily be as strong as any other teen-pop album released this year."

In response to Duff's "announcement" that "she's a complicated rock & roll adolescent on the order of Avril and Ashlee", Entertainment Weekly wrote, "Uh-huh. And Betty from the Archie comics is Patti Smith", noting Duff's "tiny" voice is "buried under layers of generic cheese arrangements." Sal Cinquemani of Slant Magazine called the album "a seemingly endless string of three-and-a-half-minute pieces of pop crap – and I like pop music", and wrote that although Duff "can't be held responsible for most of the album's insipid lyrical content", "when [she] gets in on the action things feel contrived". The New York Daily News named it the worst teen pop album of 2004, saying it was "[n]eck-and-neck for junkiest CD of the year with her arch nemesis, Lindsay Lohan [Speak]".

== Commercial performance ==
The album debuted at number two on the US Billboard 200 with 192,000 copies sold in its first week of release, which was 11,000 copies less than the first week sales of Metamorphosis. IGN Music said that partly because of the album's high debut, "at this very moment Hilary Duff is perhaps the reigning queen of bubblegum pop theatrics"; it also said that Duff's image was "undergoing an overhaul" through photo shoots in magazines such as Blender, possibly making her less "squeaky clean" like her predecessors Christina Aguilera and Britney Spears. In its second week, the album slipped to number six with 95,500 copies sold, down 51% over the first week of release; the following week the album stayed at six, selling 84,000 copies and falling 12% over the past week. Unlike Metamorphosis, Hilary Duff went no higher on the Billboard 200, and the RIAA certified it platinum a month after its release. Hilary Duff was number 112 on Billboard magazine's year-end top albums chart in December 2004 and number sixty-five on Billboard magazine's year-end top albums chart in November 2005. As of July 27, 2014, the album had sold 1,799,000 copies in the United States.

The album debuted at number one on the Nielsen SoundScan chart in Canada, as Metamorphosis had done, and it was released in Australia in October. It debuted in the top ten on the ARIA album chart, surpassing the top twenty peak of Metamorphosis and rising to its number six peak position in November. "Fly" was released as a single in the same month and did not perform as well, reaching just outside the top twenty. In Canada, the CRIA certified the album three times platinum for 300,000 copies.

== Track listing ==
Hilary Duff – Standard edition
No.	Title	Writer(s)	Producer(s)	Length
1.	"Fly"	Kara DioGuardi; John Shanks	Shanks	3:42
2.	"Do You Want Me?"	DioGuardi; Matthew Gerrard	Gerrard	3:30
3.	"Weird"	Charlie Midnight; Marc Swersky; Ron Entwistle	Midnight; Swersky; Entwistle	2:55
4.	"Hide Away"	Midnight; Shaun Shankel; Trina Harmon; Tyler Hayes Bieck	Midnight; Shankel	3:47
5.	"Mr. James Dean"	Hilary Duff; Haylie Duff; Kevin De Clue	Haylie Duff; De Clue; Andre Recke	3:28
6.	"Underneath This Smile"	DioGuardi; Shanks	Shanks	3:38
7.	"Dangerous to Know"	Midnight; Wendy Page; Jim Marr	Midnight; Page; Marr	3:33
8.	"Who's That Girl?"	Midnight; Andreas Carlsson; Desmond Child	Midnight; Carlsson; Child	3:26
9.	"Shine"	DioGuardi; Guy Chambers	Shanks	3:29
10.	"I Am"	Diane Warren	Shanks	3:43
11.	"The Getaway"	Julian Bunetta; James Michael	Bunetta	3:37
12.	"Cry"	Midnight; Charlton Pettus; Swersky	Midnight; Swersky; Pettus	3:47
13.	"Haters"	Midnight; Hilary Duff; Haylie Duff; Swersky	Midnight; Swersky	2:59
14.	"Rock This World"	Midnight; Hilary Duff; Denny Weston Jr.; Ty Stevens	Midnight; Stevens; Weston	3:46
15.	"Someone's Watching Over Me"	DioGuardi; Shanks	Shanks	4:10
16.	"Jericho"	Midnight; Chico Bennett	Midnight; Bennett	3:55
17.	"The Last Song"	Haylie Duff; De Clue	Haylie Duff; De Clue; Recke	1:25
Total length:				58:50

Hilary Duff – Asian edition (bonus track)
No.	Title	Length
18.	"Who's That Girl?" (acoustic mix)	3:25
Total length:		62:15

Hilary Duff – Japanese edition (bonus tracks)
No.	Title	Writer(s)	Producer(s)	Length
19.	"Our Lips Are Sealed"	Jane Wiedlin; Terence Hall	Midnight; Entwistle; Recke^{[a]}; Jay Landers^{[a]}; Jon Lind^{[a]}	2:40
20.	"My Generation"	Pete Townshend	Midnight; Entwistle	2:43
Total length:				67:38

Notes:

- ^{^a} signifies an executive producer
- "Our Lips Are Sealed" is a cover of the song by the Go-Go's, released in 1981.
- "My Generation" is a cover of the song by the Who's, released in 1965.
- Later releases of Hilary Duff, including most international editions, include non-listed alternate mixes of "Do You Want Me?" (3:30), "Weird" (2:56), "Hide Away" (3:47), "I Am" (3:43), "Haters" (2:58), "Rock This World" (3:46), "Jericho" (3:55), and "Cry" (4:02).
- The North American digital and 2021 LP versions of Hilary Duff include the alternate mix of "Cry" alongside the initial versions of the other tracks.

== Charts ==
=== Weekly charts ===
Chart (2004)	Peak position
Argentine Albums (CAPIF)	9
Australian Albums (ARIA)	6
Belgian Albums (Ultratop Flanders)	71
Canadian Albums (Billboard)	1
Dutch Albums (Album Top 100)	19
Japanese Albums (Oricon)	5
Malaysian International Albums (RIM)	9
New Zealand Albums (RMNZ)	14
Spanish Albums (Promusicae)	83
US Billboard 200	2

=== Year-end charts ===
Chart (2004)	Position
Australian Albums (ARIA)	69
US Billboard 200	112

Chart (2005)	Position
US Billboard 200	65

== Certifications ==
Region	Certification	Certified units/sales
Australia (ARIA)	Platinum	70,000^{^}
Canada (Music Canada)	3× Platinum	300,000^{^}
Japan (RIAJ)	Gold	100,000^{^}
New Zealand (RMNZ)	Gold	7,500^{‡}
United States (RIAA)	Platinum	1,000,000^{^}
^{^} Shipments figures based on certification alone.^{‡} Sales+streaming figures based on certification alone.

== Release history ==
Release dates and formats for Hilary Duff
Region	Date	Format	Label	Ref.
Japan	September 15, 2004	CD	Avex Trax	
Canada	September 28, 2004	CD	Universal	
United States	September 28, 2004	CD	Hollywood	
Australia	October 18, 2004	CD	Festival Mushroom	
Japan	March 28, 2007	CD	Avex Trax	
United States	May 23, 2022	LP	Hollywood Records	
