= Wake Up (Hilary Duff song) =

2005 single by Hilary Duff

Single by Hilary Duff

from the album Most Wanted
- Released: July 12, 2005
- Recorded: 2005
- Studio: Foxy (Los Angeles, California)
- Genre: Dance-pop
- Length: 3:38
- Label: Hollywood
- Songwriters: Dead Executives; Hilary Duff
- Producer: Dead Executives

Hilary Duff singles chronology
"Someone's Watching Over Me" (2005)	"Wake Up" (2005)	"Beat of My Heart" (2005)

Music video
- "Wake Up" on YouTube

"Wake Up" is a song by American actress and singer Hilary Duff from her first compilation album, Most Wanted (2005). Written by Duff and the Dead Executives, a record production team consisting of Jason Epperson, Joel Madden, and Benji Madden, "Wake Up" was crafted with the intention of having a "totally different sound" from Duff's previous material. Although she thought of the work to be a new milestone in her career, she was at the same time nervous about how her fans would react to the material. "Wake Up" was released as the lead single from Most Wanted in the United States on July 12, 2005, by Hollywood Records. It was released also digitally in the United Kingdom on October 24, 2005. A re-recorded version of the song was featured on Duff's third extended play (Mine), which was released to streaming and digital download platforms on May 29, 2026.

Described by Duff as an 1980s-influenced dance-pop song, "Wake Up" is lyrically about going out and having fun. "Wake Up" received mixed reviews from music critics. Some praised it for being "irresistible" and having a fun nature, while others criticized it for its "insipid" lyrics and noted that it sounds like "leftovers" from Duff's previous releases. "Wake Up" achieved commercial success, becoming a top-ten hit in Ireland, Italy, Norway, Spain, and the United Kingdom. It reached the top 40 in several other countries: Australia, the Netherlands, New Zealand, Switzerland and the United States. The accompanying music video for "Wake Up" features Duff leaving her house and attending various nightclubs and parties.

== Development ==
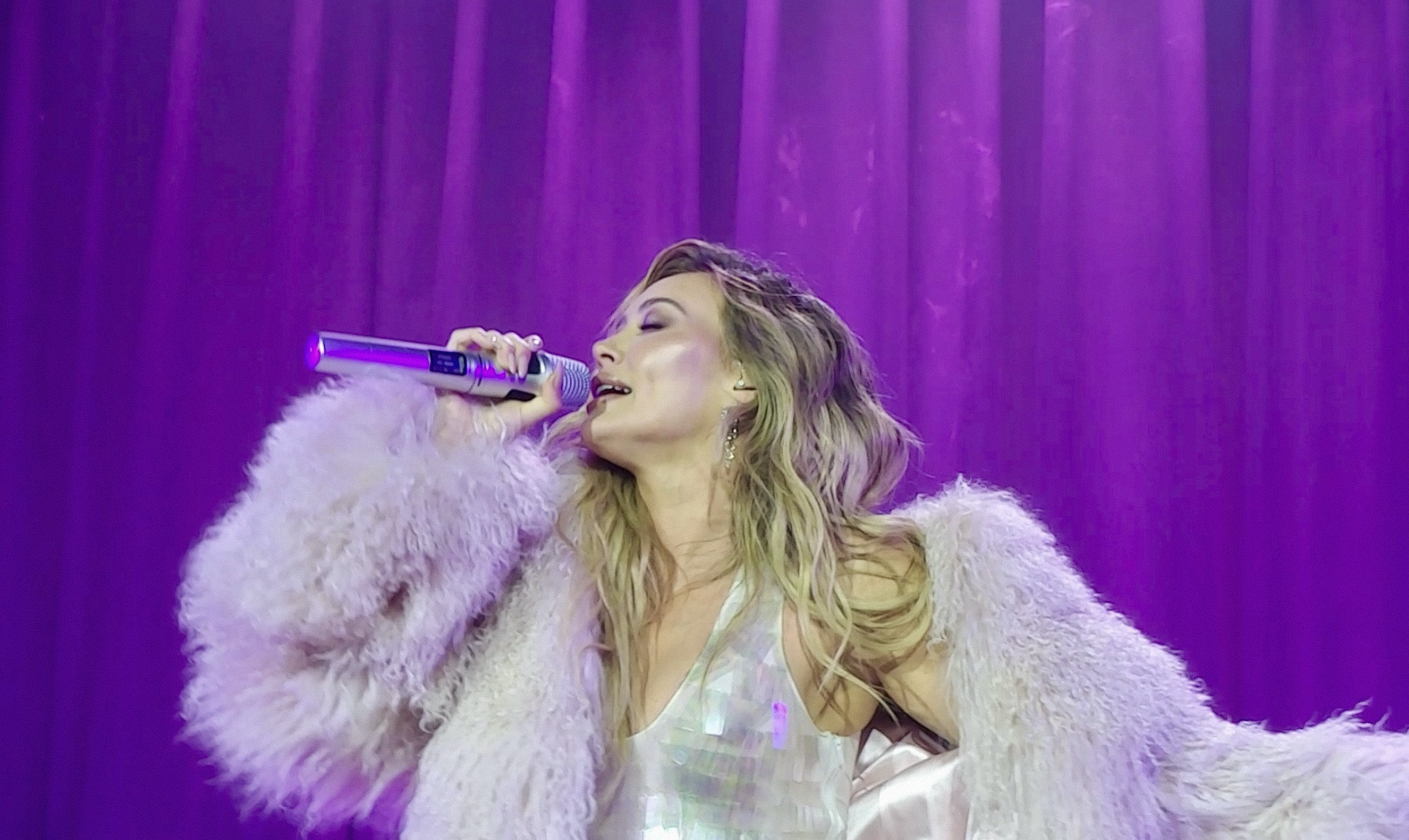
Duff performing "Wake Up" during the Small Rooms, Big Nerves tour on February 15, 2026.

On May 20, 2005, MTV News reported that Hilary Duff would be releasing a new album in August, comprising previously released tracks and four new recordings. It was also announced that preceding the album's release, Duff would begin a 32-date summer concert tour in support of the album. The following month, in an interview with MTV News, Duff said that she had been working with brothers Joel and Benji Madden of American rock band Good Charlotte and Jason Epperson (together known under the production name the Dead Executives) to write and produce new songs for the compilation. She said that " ... they're three of my favorite songs I've ever done. ... It was really fun being in the studio with them." Described by Duff as the first time when "all the responsibility was on [her]", she went into the recording studio without the guidance of her record label or management.

According to Duff, she did not tell anyone at her record label that she was working with the Dead Executives. Joel, whom Duff had been dating at the time, was aware that she needed new material for a compilation album, and knew that she wanted a "totally different sound". Together, the Dead Executives went into the recording studio and worked on new music for Duff, before bringing her into the studio to collectively work on them. Duff described working with them as pleasant, and the music as a new milestone in her career, stating that working with "people you're close with makes a world of difference when you're recording and being creative." At the same time, Duff was also nervous about how her fans would react to the new music. Duff recorded four tracks for the album, three of which were co-written and produced with the Dead Executives.

== Composition ==
"Wake Up" is a mid-tempo dance-pop song with "a more mature pop-techno sound" than Duff's previous work. She has described the song's genre as "very dancey, kind of pop – not '80s, but kind of with that in it." According to her, the song "makes you want to forget about all the pressure of dealing with your boss, or your teacher, or your mom, or [whoever]," and lyrically discusses "getting out and not forgetting to have some fun." Duff has also said that "it's really a catchy song but it talks about being in all my favorite places in the world, which is Tokyo and Paris and London and New York." The song is written in the key of E major and is set in common time, with a tempo of 118 beats per minute. Its instrumentation comes from a guitar, bass and drums. It features the sequence of E5—E/G^{#}—A(^{#}11) as its chord progression. Duff's vocal range spans exactly one octave, from C♯_{4}–C♯_{5}.

== Critical reception ==
Sal Cinquemani was critical of the song's lyrics, calling them "insipid." Stephen Thomas Erlewine of Allmusic described the song as "a sweet-natured, slightly listless spin on Gwen Stefani's 'Cool,'" and according to him, it sounded "a bit like leftovers" from Duff's previous releases.

== Chart performance ==
In the United States, "Wake Up" was released to mainstream top 40 radio on July 12, 2005, Largely because of high digital download sales, the single entered the U.S. Billboard Hot 100 at number twenty-nine in mid-August, the week's highest debut. It spent two weeks in the top forty and six on the Hot 100, and it also reached the top forty on Billboard's Pop 100 chart. In October 2005, the RIAA certified "Wake Up" gold for its download sales. As of July 27, 2014, the song had sold 437,000 digital copies in the United States.

"Wake Up" was more successful outside the U.S. It was released in the UK in late October and debuted at number seven, Duff's highest position on the singles chart there.

== Music video ==
The song's accompanying music video was directed by Marc Webb and was shot in Toronto, Ontario, Canada. Duff said, "I'm a huge fan of [the bands he's worked with], so I was really excited that he would direct my video." She added:

"The video moves really quickly and has all [these] quick pops. It shows me in Tokyo, London, Paris, New York, and it goes through all these different looks, [one] in each city, and it just shows that no matter where you are, people want [to do] the same things: they dance and they party. [...] The [style] looks kind of grainy and it's a totally different look for me."

It starts with Duff waking up on a couch, then sitting up to begin singing the song. Shortly after, the video cuts to a shot of her singing while sitting on a bench in her bedroom. After listening to music through headphones for a short while, she gets up, applies make-up, and puts on a black wig. She leaves her bedroom and rides around town in a car with several friends. She is then seen at various nightclubs in different cities. For the duration of the video, there are shots of her at different parties and clubs while she sings and clubgoers around her dance.

== Track listings ==
Australian CD single
No.	Title	Length
1.	"Wake Up"	3:39
2.	"Who's That Girl" (Acoustic Version)	3:24

UK CD single
No.	Title	Length
1.	"Wake Up"	3:39
2.	"Wake Up" (DJ Kaya Dance Remix)	4:12

UK maxi single
No.	Title	Length
1.	"Wake Up"	3:42
2.	"Wake Up" (DJ Kaya Long-T Remix)	5:31
3.	"Come Clean" (Remix 2005)	3:45
4.	"Wake Up" (music video)

== Charts ==
=== Weekly charts ===
Chart (2005)	Peak position
Australia (ARIA)	15
Austria (Ö3 Austria Top 40)	46
Belgium (Ultratip Bubbling Under Flanders)	5
Belgium (Ultratip Bubbling Under Wallonia)	17
Europe (Eurochart Hot 100)	20
France (SNEP)	24
Germany (GfK)	68
Greece (IFPI)	44
Ireland (IRMA)	5
Italy (FIMI)	2
Netherlands (Dutch Top 40)	38
Netherlands (Single Top 100)	31
New Zealand (Recorded Music NZ)	24
Norway (VG-lista)	5
Scottish Singles Sales (Official Charts)	5
Spain (Promusicae)	9
Sweden (Sverigetopplistan)	45
Switzerland (Schweizer Hitparade)	31
UK Singles (Official Charts)	7
US Billboard Hot 100	29
US Pop Airplay (Billboard)	22

=== Year-end charts ===
Chart (2005)	Position
Australia (ARIA)	100
Italy (FIMI)	40
Venezuela (Record Report)	43

Chart (2006)	Position
Brazil (Crowley)	91
Italy (FIMI)	23

== Certifications and sales ==
Region	Certification	Certified units/sales
France	—	39,998
United States (RIAA)	Gold	500,000^{*}
^{*} Sales figures based on certification alone.

== Release history ==
Region	Date	Format	Label	Ref(s).
United States	July 12, 2005	Contemporary hit radio	Hollywood	
Australia	August 29, 2005	CD	Hollywood	
Italy	October 19, 2005	CD	Hollywood	
Germany	October 21, 2005	CD	Hollywood	
United Kingdom	October 24, 2005	CD	Hollywood	
Germany	November 4, 2005	CD	Hollywood	
