= Someone's Watching Over Me =

2005 single by Hilary Duff

Single by Hilary Duff

from the album Hilary Duff
- B-side: "My Generation"
- Released: February 21, 2005
- Genre: Soft rock
- Length: 4:11
- Label: Hollywood
- Songwriters: Kara DioGuardi; John Shanks
- Producer: John Shanks

Hilary Duff singles chronology
"Fly" (2004)	"Someone's Watching Over Me" (2005)	"Wake Up" (2005)

Audio video
- "Someone's Watching Over Me" on YouTube

"Someone's Watching Over Me" is a song recorded by American singer Hilary Duff for her self-titled third studio album (2004). It was released by Hollywood Records as the album's second single only in Australia. The song was written by Kara DioGuardi and John Shanks, who also produced the song.

== Background and composition ==
The song was written by DioGuardi and Shanks for the film Raise Your Voice, in which Hilary Duff stars. In the movie, which is set at a performing arts summer school, Duff's character, Terri Fletcher, writes the song with her fellow student Jay, played by Oliver James, and performs it at the film's climax in front of the students, staff and parents. The song is dedicated to Terri's late brother, Paul, who supported her dream to become a musician. The song states that in all the challenges Terri needs to overcome in her journey to fulfill her dream, although not physically present, someone is still there watching over her.

Musically, "Someone's Watching Over Me" is a moderately paced pop song, moving at a tempo of 78 beats per minute. Written in the key of E Major, the song has the sequence of C♯m—F♯m—B—B/G♯—G♯m—G♯/C as its chord progression in the verses, and then moves to E-B-C♯m-B-A-B in the chorus. Lyrically, the song speaks about "holding on no matter what happens in life, believing that someone's watching over".

== Reception ==
According to Paul Broucek, executive vice president of music for New Line Cinema, in November 2004, "Someone's Watching Over Me" was one of the studio's possible contenders for an Academy Award nomination for Best Original Song at the 77th Academy Awards. The Herald Sun wrote of "Someone's Watching Over Me", which it awarded one star, "Yeah, that'd be Lindsay Lohan. They're single-white-femaling each other when it comes to music, though Duff got in first with the polite Avril-lite soft rock. However, this positivity-laden ballad sucks." The Sunday Telegraph published a two-star review of the song, editorializing that "The banging migraine kicked in somewhere around the lyrics: "I've seen that ray of light/It's shining on my destiny" [...] a brainless, infectious dose of made-to-order teen empowerment pop."

== Chart performance ==
As of July 27, 2014, the song had sold 238,000 digital copies in the United States. Outside the United States, during the week of the single's radio release in Australia in January, it was the fifth most added song to station playlists. After its release as a single the following month, it peaked at number twenty-two on the ARIA Singles Chart and remained in the top forty for nine weeks. The single's B-side is a cover of The Who's "My Generation".

== Track listing ==
CD single

1. "Someone's Watching Over Me" – 4:11
2. "My Generation" – 2:41

== Charts ==
Chart (2005)	Peak position
Australia (ARIA)	22
