= Denny Weston Jr. =

American drummer

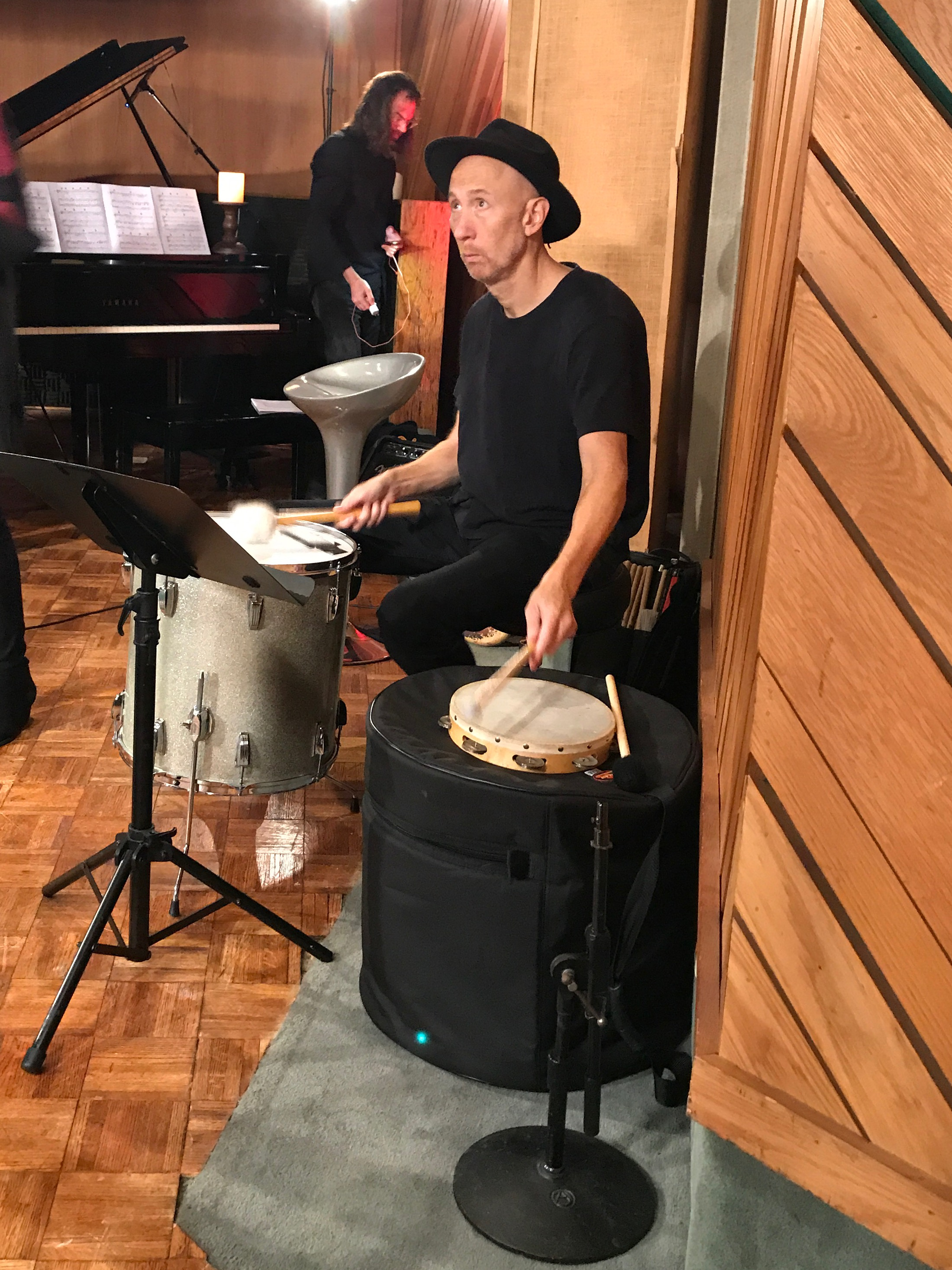

Background information
- Born: Baltimore, Maryland, U.S.
- Origin: Los Angeles, California, U.S.
- Occupations: Musician; songwriter; record producer
- Instrument: Drums
- Years active: 1986–present
- Label: American Recordings (Warner Chappell)
- Website: dennyweston.com

Denny Weston Jr. is an American drummer, composer, and songwriter.

== Biography ==
Weston has recorded and performed with acts including KT Tunstall, Goldfrapp, the Kooks, Take That, Michael Kiwanuka, Earlimart, AM & Shawn Lee, Orgone, Robert Palmer, Carlos Santana, and White Sea. He is currently a member of the Los Angeles-based experimental music and visual art improvisational group Arthur King and the Night Sea which releases music and visual art though Dangerbird Records. Weston is the drummer for the band, The Vacation on Rick Rubin's American Recordings.

Weston was a staff songwriter for Warner/Chappell Music and composes for artists, films, commercials and advertisements. Weston has performed on many television shows such as: MTV, Late Night with David Letterman, The Tonight Show, The Today Show, Later... with Jools Holland, and Jimmy Kimmel Live!.

Weston currently records and tours with KT Tunstall.

He is featured in the August 2017 issue of Drumhead Magazine.

== Personal life ==
Weston Jr. resides in Los Angeles, California.
