= Chico Bennett =

American songwriter

Chico Bennett is an American record producer, musician, and songwriter based in Los Angeles, California, United States. He has written, produced and/or remixed for artists such as Madonna, Lady Gaga, The Killers, Hilary Duff, Usher, Nelly Furtado and Destiny's Child.

Bennett started his career in his early teens when he attracted the attention of music legend Prince, who gave him his first production job at the age of 19.

In 2000, Chico began developing music projects with DJ/Producer/Remixer Richard Vission, with whom he later formed a partnership.

In 2003, Bennett founded the music production company Zero 1 Entertainment, Inc and Snaptime Music Publishing to develop new artist projects. Through Zero 1 Entertainment, Bennett has developed new artists like Stranger Days, J1, Brig Feltus, and Kodi Hill. Bennett has since worked with R&B Superstar Usher, Pop/Rock Princesses The Veronicas, Los Angeles Rap Artist Mann, and Britney Spears.

In 2008, Bennett launched the label Captive Libertine Recordings, Inc. with artist Brig Feltus.
