= Best of Hilary Duff =

Greatest hits album by Hilary Duff
- Released: November 11, 2008
- Recorded: 2003–2007
- Genre: Pop
- Length: 46:21
- Label: Hollywood
- Producers: Chico Bennett; Andreas Carlsson; Desmond Child; Dead Executives; Matthew Gerrard; Derrick Haruin; Rhett Lawrence; Logic; The Matrix; Charlie Midnight; Vada Nobles; Richard Vission; John Shanks; Ryan "Alias" Tedder; Denny Weston Jr.

Hilary Duff chronology
Dignity (2007)	Best of Hilary Duff (2008)	Breathe In. Breathe Out. (2015)

Singles from Best of Hilary Duff
- 1. "Reach Out" Released: October 20, 2008

Best of Hilary Duff is the third compilation and first greatest hits album by American singer-songwriter Hilary Duff, released on November 11, 2008, by Hollywood Records. The standard 12-track edition consists of eight of Duff's previous singles, as well as two new recordings: "Reach Out" and "Holiday". It also includes three new remixes: two of the former, and one of her 2003 single, "Come Clean". Alternate editions of the album with additional tracks were released in Australia, Europe, and Japan.

One single was released from the album, the Ryan Tedder-produced "Reach Out", which became her third consecutive single to chart at number one on the Billboard Hot Dance Club Play chart. Best of Hilary Duff received mixed reviews from music critics.

== Background ==
In June 2007, Duff began her fourth concert tour, the Dignity Tour, in support of her fourth studio album, Dignity (2007). During the tour, she performed a previously unheard song, "Reach Out". In September 2007, she confirmed that the song was a collaboration with the rapper Prophet and that it would be released as a single.

In November 2007, Duff said that Dignity would be re-released in a new edition featuring remixes of the original songs alongside two new tracks: "Reach Out" and "Holiday". Duff said she hoped to write a third new song for the re-release and to have "Holiday" released as its first or second single. However, these plans did not come to fruition. Instead, Hollywood Records asked Duff to release Best of Hilary Duff to complete her contract with the label. Duff was disappointed with the release, saying in an interview on the Johnjay and Rich Show: "My label had an option to put this record out, and they did it, and I was a little bummed." She elaborated in 2015: "It made me really upset. Like, I was 19. Why was I having a greatest hits album?" The album artwork, photographed by Leslie Kee, was previously used for the Japanese release of Dignity the year prior.

== Critical reception ==
Professional ratings
Review scores
Source	Rating
Allmusic	3.5/5 stars
Common Sense Media	3/5 stars
Digital Spy	2/5 stars

Best of Hilary Duff received mostly mixed reviews from critics. Allmusic gave the album a positive review stating that Best of Hilary Duff "is a flipside of her 2005's Most Wanted", which was "pitched squarely at bright, happy tweens". They also went on to say the album "is not a look back at the past but a blueprint for the future". Rachel Devitt of Rhapsody said the collection "is largely pleasant, nicely polished and, rather surprisingly, sleek and even a little edgy. Turns out Lizzie McGuire is a dancefloor diva, and even with that feathery little voice, she manages to work it on tracks like the dark "Stranger," saucy new tune "Reach Out" and a clubby remix of "Dignity." Common Sense Media described the album as having varied influences, and said that "Duff deftly combines the infectious dance beats she's known for with a more sultry vocal tone reminiscent of Nelly Furtado and even Britney Spears." In a more negative review, David Balls from Digital Spy also described the album as having a varied sound, but felt that it prevented the album from coming across as "genuine", writing: "her sound has changed as often as Posh Spice's hairstyle".

== Commercial performance ==
On November 29, 2008, Best of Hilary Duff debuted at number 125 on the US Billboard 200 chart, selling 5,500 copies in its first week of release in the US, making it her least successful album to date.

== Singles ==
"Reach Out" was released as the only single from the album. The music video was directed by Philip Andelman and five official versions were released. The music video premiered on Duff's official MySpace on October 28, 2008.

== Track listings ==
No.	Title	Writer(s)	Producer(s)	Length
1.	"Reach Out"	Ryan Tedder; Martin Gore; Evan Bogart; Mika Guillory	Tedder	4:14
2.	"Holiday"	Tedder; Hilary Duff; Haylie Duff	Tedder	4:05
3.	"Stranger" (from Dignity, 2007)	Hilary Duff; Kara DioGuardi; Vada Nobles; Julius Diaz; Derrick Haruin	Nobles; Haruin; Logic	4:14
4.	"With Love" (from Dignity, 2007)	Hilary Duff; DioGuardi; Nobles; Diaz	Nobles; Logic	3:05^{[c]}
5.	"Play with Fire" (from Dignity, 2007)	Hilary Duff; DioGuardi; Rhett Lawrence; Will.i.am	Lawrence	3:01
6.	"Wake Up" (from Most Wanted, 2005)	Hilary Duff; Dead Executives	Dead Executives	3:38
7.	"Fly" (from Hilary Duff, 2004)	DioGuardi; John Shanks	Shanks	3:45
8.	"Come Clean" (2008 Remix) (original from Metamorphosis, 2003)	DioGuardi; Shanks	Shanks; Chico Bennett^{[a]}; Richard Vission^{[a]}	3:20
9.	"So Yesterday" (from Metamorphosis, 2003)	Charlie Midnight; Lauren Christy; Scott Spock; Graham Edwards	The Matrix	3:36
10.	"Why Not" (from The Lizzie McGuire Movie, 2003)	Midnight; Matthew Gerrard	Gerrard	3:00
11.	"Reach Out" (Richard Vission Remix)	Tedder; Gore; Bogart; Guillory	Tedder; Vission^{[a]}; Bennett^{[a]}; Dirty Freqs^{[a]}	6:16
12.	"Holiday" (Bermudez-Chico Remix)	Tedder; Hilary Duff; Haylie Duff	Tedder; Bennett^{[a]}; Joe Bermudez^{[a]}	4:08
Total length:				46:22

Digital bonus tracks
No.	Title	Writer(s)	Producer(s)	Length
13.	"Stranger" (Vission vs. Audé Mixshow)	Hilary Duff; DioGuardi; Nobles; Diaz; Haruin	Nobles; Haruin; Logic; Vission^{[c]}; Dave Audé^{[a]}	5:34
14.	"Dignity" (Richard Vission Remix)	Hilary Duff; DioGuardi; Bennett; Vission	Bennett^{[b]}; Vission^{[b]}	3:43
Total length:				55:39

Australian edition
No.	Title	Writer(s)	Producer(s)	Length
13.	"Little Voice" (from Metamorphosis, 2003)	DioGuardi; Patrik Berger	Bennett; DioGuardi	3:04
14.	"Our Lips Are Sealed" (with Haylie Duff) (from A Cinderella Story, 2004)	Jane Wiedlin; Terence Hall	Midnight; Spider	2:38
Total length:				52:04

Japanese edition bonus tracks
No.	Title	Writer(s)	Producer(s)	Length
13.	"Metamorphosis" (from Metamorphosis, 2003)	Midnight; Hilary Duff; Bennett; Andre Recke	Bennett; Midnight	3:27
14.	"Come Clean" (from Metamorphosis, 2003)	DioGuardi; Shanks	Shanks	3:33
15.	"Girl Can Rock" (from Metamorphosis, 2003)	Midnight; Denny Weston Jr.	Midnight; Weston	3:02
16.	"Who's That Girl?" (from Hilary Duff, 2004)	Midnight; Desmond Child; Andreas Carlsson	Child; Midnight; Carlsson	3:25
17.	"Our Lips Are Sealed" (with Haylie Duff)	Jane Wiedlin; Terence Hall	Midnight; Spider	2:38
18.	"Beat of My Heart" (from Most Wanted, 2005)	Hilary Duff; Dead Executives	Dead Executives	3:08
19.	"Reach Out" (Caramel Pod E Remix)	Tedder; Gore; Bogart; Guillory	Tedder; Caramel Pod E.^{[a]}	7:14
Total length:				72:49

European edition
No.	Title	Writer(s)	Producer(s)	Length
1.	"Reach Out"	Tedder; Gore; Bogart; Guillory	Tedder	4:14
2.	"Holiday"	Tedder; Hilary Duff; Haylie Duff	Tedder	4:05
3.	"Stranger"	Hilary Duff; DioGuardi; Nobles; Diaz; Haruin	Nobles; Haruin; Logic	4:14
4.	"With Love"	Hilary Duff; DioGuardi; Nobles; Diaz	Nobles; Logic	3:05
5.	"Play with Fire"	Hilary Duff; DioGuardi; Lawrence; Will.i.am	Lawrence	3:01
6.	"Dignity" (from Dignity, 2007)	Hilary Duff; DioGuardi; Bennett; Vission	Bennett; Vission	3:14
7.	"Wake Up"	Hilary Duff; Dead Executives	Dead Executives	3:38
8.	"Fly"	DioGuardi; Shanks	Shanks	3:45
9.	"Come Clean" (2008 Remix)	DioGuardi; Shanks	Shanks; Bennett^{[a]}; Vission^{[a]}	3:20
10.	"So Yesterday"	Midnight; Christy; Spock; Edwards	The Matrix	3:36
11.	"Why Not"	Midnight; Gerrard	Gerrard	3:00
12.	"Beat of My Heart"	Hilary Duff; Dead Executives	Dead Executives	3:08
13.	"Reach Out" (Richard Vission Remix)	Tedder; Gore; Bogart; Guillory	Tedder; Vission^{[a]}; Bennett^{[a]}; Dirty Freqs^{[a]}	6:16
14.	"Holiday" (Bermudez-Chico Remix)	Tedder; Hilary Duff; Haylie Duff	Tedder; Bennett^{[a]}; Joe Bermudez^{[a]}	4:08
15.	"Stranger" (Smax & Gold Club Mix)	Hilary Duff; DioGuardi; Nobles; Diaz; Haruin	Nobles; Haruin; Logic; Smax & Gold^{[a]}	8:46
16.	"With Love" (Bimbo Jones Remix)	Hilary Duff; DioGuardi; Nobles; Diaz	Nobles; Logic; Bimbo Jones^{[a]}	6:40
Total length:				68:10

European iTunes Store edition bonus tracks
No.	Title	Writer(s)	Producer(s)	Length
17.	"Stranger" (Vission vs. Audé Mixshow)	Hilary Duff; DioGuardi; Nobles; Diaz; Haruin	Nobles; Haruin; Logic; Vission^{[a]}; Dave Audé^{[a]}	5:34
18.	"Dignity" (Richard Vission Remix)	Hilary Duff; DioGuardi; Bennett; Vission	Bennett^{[b]}; Vission^{[b]}	3:43
Total length:				77:31

Notes

- ^{^[a]} signifies a remixer.
- ^{^[b]} signifies an original producer and remixer.
- "Reach Out" features uncredited rap verses performed by R. Prophet.
- "Why Not" on Best of Hilary Duff is the Metamorphosis album version.
- "With Love" on Best of Hilary Duff is the UK single version.
- "Girl Can Rock" on Best of Hilary Duff is the Most Wanted album version.
- The 2025 vinyl edition of Best of Hilary Duff contains tracks 1 to 10 on the standard edition track listing, omitting the remixes of "Reach Out" and "Holiday".

== Personnel ==
Credits adapted from the liner notes of the Japanese edition of the album

- Hilary Duff – vocals & executive production (all tracks)
- Prophet – vocals (track 1)
- Haylie Duff – vocals (track 17)
- Ryan Tedder – production & engineering (tracks 1, 2, 11, 12, 19)
- Derrick Haruin – production (track 3)
- Vada Nobles – production & mixing (tracks 3, 4)
- Logic – production & mixing (tracks 3, 4)
- Rhett Lawrence – production, mixing & engineering (track 5)
- Dead Executives – production & mixing (tracks 6, 18); bass guitar (track 18)
- John Shanks – production (tracks 7, 8, 14); mixing (track 7)
- The Matrix – production, mixing, arrangement & recording (track 9)
- Matthew Gerrard – production (track 10)
- Chico Bennett – production (track 13); remixing (tracks 8, 12); additional production (tracks 11, 12)
- Charlie Midnight – production (tracks 13, 15-17)
- Denny Weston Jr. – production (track 15)
- Desmond Child – production (track 16)
- Andreas Carlsson – production (track 16)
- Andre Recke – production (track 16); executive production (all tracks)
- Spider – production (track 17)
- Phil Tan – mixing (tracks 1, 2, 11, 12, 19)
- Jason Graucott – mixing (tracks 3, 4)
- Dave Pensado – mixing & engineering (track 5)
- Steve McMillan – mixing & engineering (track 5)
- Jeff Rothschild – mixing (track 7)
- Rob Chiarelli – mixing (tracks 10, 14)
- Joel Soyffer – mixing (tracks 13, 15, 17)
- Dave Way – mixing (track 16)
- Richard Vission – remixing (tracks 8, 11)
- Caramel Pod E – remixing (track 19)
- Joe Bermudez – remixing & additional production (track 12)
- Dirty Freqs – additional production (track 11)
- Brian Reeves – additional recording & mixing (tracks 1, 11, 19)
- Jay Landers – executive production (track 17)
- Jon Lind – executive production (track 17)
- Dean Butterworth – drums (track 18)
- Monique Powell – background vocals (track 18)
- The Fruit – background vocals (track 18)
- Allan Hessler – engineering assistance (track 18)
- Robert Vosgien – mastering (all tracks)
- Leslie Kee – photography & creative direction
- Enny Joo – art direction & design

== Charts ==
Chart performance for Best of Hilary Duff
Chart (2008–2009)	Peak position
Argentine Albums (CAPIF)	5
Canadian Albums (Nielsen SoundScan)	86
Greek International Albums (IFPI)	19
Irish Albums (IRMA)	86
Italian Albums (FIMI)	41
Japanese Albums (Oricon)	32
Japanese Top Albums Sales (Billboard Japan)	32
Mexican Albums (Top 100 Mexico)	53
US Billboard 200	125

== Release history ==
Release history for Best of Hilary Duff
Country	Date	Label
Canada	November 11, 2008	Universal
United States	November 11, 2008	Hollywood
Australia	November 15, 2008	EMI
Japan	December 3, 2008	Avex Trax
Italy	January 22, 2009	EMI
Poland	January 25, 2009	EMI
New Zealand	January 26, 2009	EMI
United Kingdom	January 26, 2009	EMI
Denmark	January 28, 2009	EMI
Sweden	January 28, 2009	EMI
Spain	February 20, 2009	EMI
