= Material Girls =

2006 film by Martha Coolidge

- Theatrical release poster
- Directed by: Martha Coolidge
- Written by: John Quaintance; Jessica O'Toole; Amy Rardin
- Produced by: Milton Kim; Tim Wesley; Mark Morgan; Guy Oseary; Hilary Duff; Susan Duff; Eve LaDue; David Faigenblum
- Starring: Hilary Duff; Haylie Duff; Anjelica Huston; Lukas Haas; María Conchita Alonso; Brent Spiner
- Cinematography: Johnny E. Jensen
- Edited by: Steven Cohen
- Music by: Jennie Muskett
- Production companies: Maverick Films; Rafter H Entertainment
- Distributed by: Metro-Goldwyn-Mayer Pictures (through MGM Distribution Co.)
- Release date: August 18, 2006 (United States)
- Running time: 98 minutes
- Country: United States
- Language: English
- Box office: $16.9 million

Material Girls is a 2006 American teen comedy film directed by Martha Coolidge, loosely based on Jane Austen's 1811 novel Sense and Sensibility, updating the setting to modern Los Angeles. Starring Hilary Duff and Haylie Duff, the film is co-produced by Maverick Films and Rafter H Entertainment. The film grossed $16.9 million and was panned by critics.

== Plot ==
Sisters Tanzie and Ava are wealthy, spoiled Hollywood socialites who enjoy shopping and dating, paying little attention to their late father's company, Marchetta Cosmetics, run by co-founder and family friend Tommy Katzenbach. Tanzie, an aspiring chemist, is going to college soon and Ava is planning to announce her engagement with actor fiancé Mick.

A major media scandal breaks, involving disfigurement from Marchetta night cream. The girls and their father's reputation is destroyed, and Ava and Tanzie retreat to their mansion. While preparing a home spa treatment, Tanzie accidentally spills nail polish remover. Ava's lit cigarette is then dropped during an argument, starting a fire.

Ava saves their father's watch and her engagement party dress while Tanzie saves their TiVo box with recordings of her father talking about his cosmetics. Going to a hotel, they learn all their credit cards have been blocked, leaving them completely broke. They move in with their maid, and close family friend, Inez in her small apartment. While there, their car is stolen by two men whom they naively mistook for valets.

The next morning, Ava and Tanzie, without their car, take a bus and then walk the rest of the way to Ava's engagement party. They are refused entry, their friend Etienne ignores them, and they realize they were only liked for their money. Ava's fiancé Mick has his agent, a man named Sol, dump her as she is now considered a "liability," referring to their engagement as if it were a business transaction.

Tommy plans to persuade the board of directors to sell Marchetta Cosmetics to archrival Fabiella for $60 million (or $30 million each). The girls have 30 days until the stockholders meeting, when the deal will be made official.

The deal would mean they could return to their extravagant lifestyles, but they are depressed over their father's legacy being destroyed. After Tanzie's love interest Rick, the company's lab technician, helps them evade the press outside, Ava and Tanzie decide to become "private investigators" and approach free legal clinic lawyer Henry for help. He agrees, after initially refusing as they are not "underprivileged". Determined to restore their father's reputation, the sisters are determined to uncover the truth.

Watching the news, Tanzie recognizes a woman who accused Marchetta of leaving her disfigured as also in an eczema documentary on KLAE. Tanzie goes to the KLAE offices dressed provocatively and flirts with the receptionist, who allows her access to the file room. She manages to obtain the woman's address, before being arrested and put in jail for fraud and trespassing. Ava pawns her father's Rolex (her most treasured possession) to pay Tanzie's bail money after Henry helps her realize that family is more important than material things.

The woman, Margo Thorness, says that Marchetta paid for her cosmetic surgery for the supposed damage caused by Marchetta Everdew night cream. However, Ava and Tanzie learn from her neighbor that she lied, as she was born with a skin disease. The girls meet with the board of directors and successfully clear the Marchetta name, revealing that Tommy (their father's best friend and trustee of the company) was behind the scandal, as he had helped fabricate testimonials, and used money taken from the sisters' personal bank accounts. Tommy is promptly fired by Ava.

Six months later, the girls are running the company, with Ava as the new CEO and Tanzie studying while working as a chemist. Ava is now in a relationship with Henry, and Tanzie is now with Rick.

== Cast ==
- Hilary Duff as Tanzie Marchetta
- Haylie Duff as Ava Marchetta
- Anjelica Huston as Fabiella
- Brent Spiner as Tommy Katzenbach
- Lukas Haas as Henry Baines
- Marcus Coloma as Rick
- María Conchita Alonso as Inez
- Obba Babatundé as Mr. Craig
- Reagan Dale Neis as Jaden
- Faith Prince as Pam
- Henry Cho as Ned Nakamori
- Judy Tenuta as Margo Thorness
- Brandon Beemer as Mick

== Production ==
The film began production on April 18, 2005, in Los Angeles, California. For the film's soundtrack, Hilary Duff recorded two new songs: "Happy" (which was then an early version of "Play with Fire", her single released in August 2006) and a cover version of the Madonna song "Material Girl", performed with Haylie Duff, which was the inspiration for the film's story and is featured at the beginning of the film.

== Reception ==
=== Release ===
On March 31, 2006, the entertainment site AndPop.com reported that Lukas Haas had said he did not expect the film to be released. These statements were confirmed on April 5, in an article in The Ryersonian. Haas expressed his unhappiness with the film, and said they had been trying to sell the film for a long time with little success. On April 6, 2006, the website Box Office Mojo reported that Metro-Goldwyn-Mayer Pictures had picked up the North American distribution rights to Material Girls and would be releasing the film on August 25. It was later changed to August 18.

Material Girls was released in 1,500 theaters in the U.S. and debuted at #9 on the weekend box office chart, grossing only US$4.62 million in its first three days of release. The DVD for Material Girls was released on December 12, 2006, in the U.S. by 20th Century Fox under the MGM Home Entertainment label. It is a double-sided DVD with special features including the music video for Hilary Duff's single "Play with Fire". In the UK the film was released on March 2, 2007, to coincide with the release of Duff's single "With Love", her album Dignity, and the UK release of her scent With Love... Hilary Duff. It was distributed by Twentieth Century Fox. The film has garnered a total of $16,847,695 worldwide.

=== Critical response ===
On the review aggregator website Rotten Tomatoes, 4% of 54 critics' reviews are positive, with an average rating of 3/10. The website's consensus reads: "Plagued by paper-thin characterizations and a hackneyed script, Material Girls fails to live up to even the minimum standards of its genre." Metacritic, which uses a weighted average, assigned the film a score of 17 out of 100, based on 12 critics, indicating "overwhelming dislike". Audiences surveyed by CinemaScore gave the film a grade of "B−" on scale of A+ to F. Hilary and Haylie Duff's performances were panned by critics and earned both of them Razzie Award nominations for Worst Actress and Worst Screen Couple.

Amelie Gillette of The A.V. Club wrote in her review that, "Their portrayal isn't some light send-up of materialism. It's a light endorsement of it." Writing for The New York Times, Manohla Dargis wrote "The real-life sisters Hilary and Haylie Duff star in this incompetent spin on the poor-little-rich-girl story. Not yet legal and apparently never educated, the sisters live with a fleet of happy helpers, [...] aren’t just spoiled rotten; they’re nitwits."
