= Dignity (album) =

Studio album by Hilary Duff
- Released: March 21, 2007
- Recorded: 2006
- Genres: Dance-pop; electropop
- Length: 48:36
- Label: Hollywood
- Producers: Tim & Bob; Mateo Camargo; Kara DioGuardi; Victor Gonzalez; Derrick Haruin; Logic; Rhett Lawrence; Raine Maida; Fredwreck Nassar; Vada Nobles; Ryan Tedder; Chico Bennett; Greg Wells; Richard Vission

Hilary Duff chronology
4Ever Hilary Duff (2006)	Dignity (2007)	Best of Hilary Duff (2008)

Japanese edition cover

Singles from Dignity
- 1. "Play with Fire" Released: August 21, 2006; 2. "With Love" Released: February 20, 2007; 3. "Stranger" Released: June 25, 2007

Dignity is the fourth studio album by American singer-songwriter Hilary Duff. It was released on March 21, 2007, by Hollywood Records. After releasing her third studio album Hilary Duff (2004), she experienced an eventful personal life, including a stalking incident, her parents getting divorced and her breakup with her boyfriend Joel Madden after two years of dating. Consequently, Duff assumed an integral position in its production, co-writing almost every track with longtime collaborator Kara DioGuardi instead of her previously-limited involvement.

In contrast to the pop-rock themes of her prior releases, Dignity takes on more of a dance and electropop sound, which she said was not her intention while writing the album. The lyrics reference the events Duff experienced in the years leading to the album's release, and the album's songs contain influences of rock and hip-hop music.

Critical response was mostly positive; the album was praised for its songwriting and her new musical direction. Upon release, Dignity debuted at number three on the US Billboard 200. This was a lower peak than Duff's previous albums and the album had lower sales, which Billboard attributed to the loss of fans during her musical evolution. Despite this, it produced Duff's highest-peaking single on the US Billboard Hot 100 to date, "With Love", which peaked at number twenty-four. The song also topped the US Dance Club Songs chart, as did her subsequent single from the album, "Stranger". The album reached the top ten in several countries and was certified Gold in the United States by the Recording Industry Association of America (RIAA). To promote the album, Duff embarked on her fourth concert tour, the Dignity Tour, between July 2007 and February 2008.

== Background ==
Duff's previous studio album, the self-titled Hilary Duff (2004), received generally negative reviews. The album peaked at number two on the Billboard 200, and its commercial performance was still successful: it exited the chart after 33 weeks and sold 1.8 million copies in the United States.

Between the releases of Hilary Duff and Dignity, Duff's personal life was eventful. In October 2006, she and her boyfriend at the time, Joel Madden of punk rock band Good Charlotte, claimed that they were being stalked by Russian emigre Maksim Miakovsky and his roommate, paparazzo David Joseph Klein. According to a restraining order filed by Duff, Miakovsky came to the United States solely to pursue a relationship with her. He was later arrested after threatening to kill her. In November, she ended her two-year relationship with Madden. Around the same time, her parents Robert and Susan separated after 22 years of marriage following an affair between Robert and another woman.

== Writing and development ==
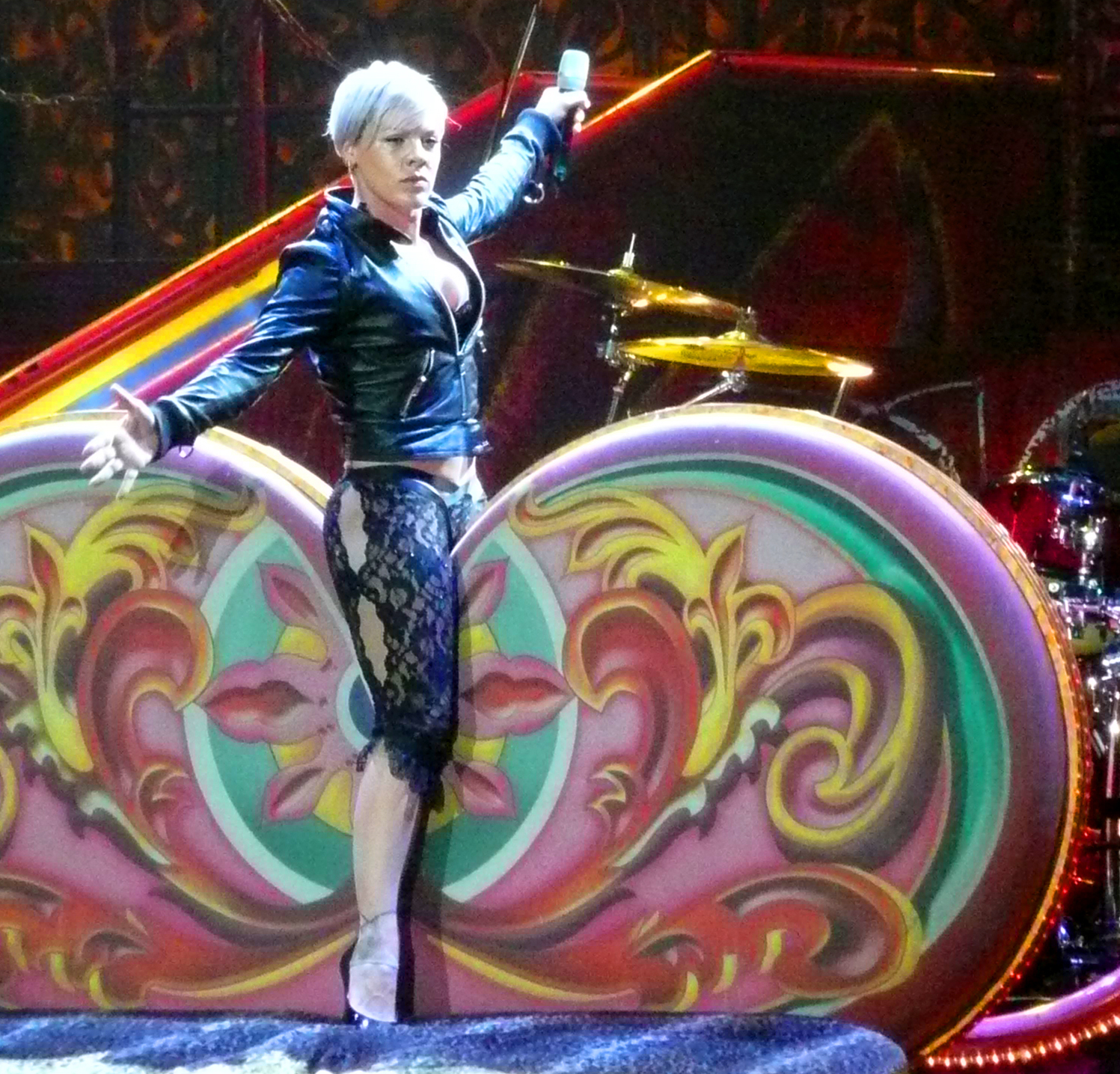
"Outside of You" was co-written by Pink (pictured)

Following the release of her first compilation Most Wanted (2005), Duff began working on new material between dates of her Still Most Wanted Tour. The album was initially planned for a November 2006 release before being postponed. In August 2006, Duff confirmed that her then-boyfriend Joel Madden would not be working on new material for the album as he had with Most Wanted, citing that his group Good Charlotte was busy with their own upcoming record.

Duff sought more creative control on Dignity than she had on previous records, co-writing all but one of the album's tracks. "That hadn't really been part of my process on previous records, except here and there. It was important this time," she said. Duff worked extensively with her previous collaborator, songwriter and producer Kara DioGuardi, who worked on several of Duff's previous singles such as "Come Clean" and "Fly". Duff found her lyrics were complemented by DioGuardi's melodies, noting: "I helped with the melodies, but that's not my strongest suit. Coming up with the lyrics was mainly [what I did]. I'd tell her this is how I want it to go, and she would help with the lyrics, too, sometimes. She'd say, 'This doesn't really fit,' and if I was adamant, we'd make it work." Duff also collaborated with sister Haylie Duff on the track "Gypsy Woman" despite initial reports that Haylie would not be involved with the writing on the album. Duff explained her writing process:

[The album] has all of me in it. I never did my records like that before. I got to choose the music, but this time around it was, like, I'd sit down and think: 'What happened to me yesterday? What happened to me today?' and just write. It was very therapeutic, in a way. And easy – I was shocked at how easy it was to be honest about yourself and things that affect you. It is a dance record, but I wanted it to be serious. I wanted to talk about serious things, but do it in a not-so-serious way, with music that makes you want to get up and dance.

Much of Dignity was written in Duff's own home, as she felt "comfortable and free" there. Duff drew musical inspiration from other artists such as The Faint, Beyoncé, and Gwen Stefani. "Outside of You", the sole track on the album not to have any writing credits from Duff, was written by Pink, Chantal Kreviazuk and Raine Maida. In an interview, Maida stated that the song was written for a Pink album but did not make the final cut, and Duff later expressed interest in the song.

The title for the album was not chosen until the majority of it had been completed. Duff explained of the title, "I'm older and more mature now than I was when I made my last record, but I don't think I know it all. Having dignity is something you work on your whole life, in how you treat people and how you treat yourself. I hope I always strive to have it." She also noted, "It's not something that you can be given or that you can just get or that you're born with. It's something that you have to work on."

== Composition ==
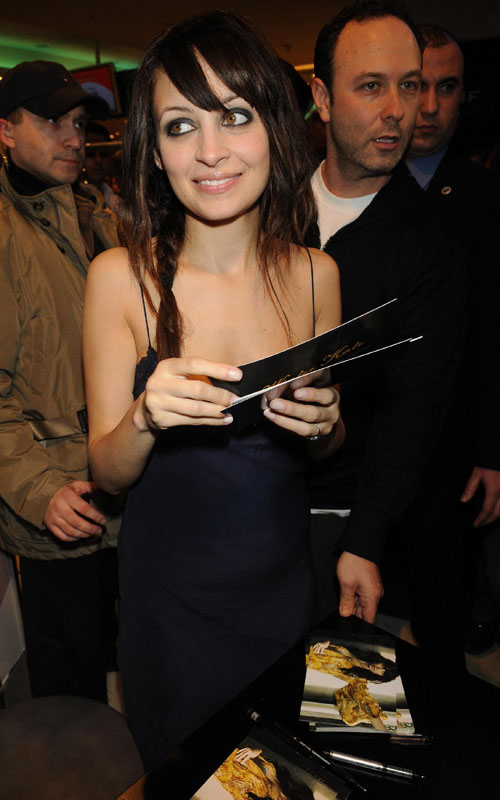
Various publications speculated that Nicole Richie was the subject of several songs on Dignity

As inspiration for the album, Duff cited indie rock band the Faint and pop singers such as Gwen Stefani and Beyoncé, while critics compared her musical style with Stefani, Janet Jackson, Depeche Mode, Madonna and Justin Timberlake. Duff felt that the album's dance-pop themes were a deviation from the pop rock of her previous albums. "I didn't necessarily plan the album to sound like this, but it was so easy to write to," she said. Critics have noted that Dignity's musical style is dance-pop and electropop, with influences of hip hop, rock and roll and Middle Eastern music. According to Duff, the album is a combination of dance, electro and rock music.

The lyrics of several songs relate to Duff's experiences between the releases of Hilary Duff and Dignity. Despite speculation that the songs "Stranger" and "Gypsy Woman" were written about Madden's then-new girlfriend Nicole Richie, they were actually written about Duff's father's affair. She said that "Stranger" was written from her mother's perspective. "'Stranger' is a song I wrote about how my mom must feel around my dad," she said. "I made it seem like it was about a relationship I was in, because I didn't want people to know about my parents. But I've realized that so many people can relate to what I've gone through." The album's title track was also reported to be about Richie, to which Duff clarified: "Dignity is a song that is definitely about people in Hollywood. I wouldn't say that it is about her specifically but it is about people that kind of do what she does and act the way she acts." The song "Danger" was written about one of Duff's friends' relationships with an older man. "I understand that feeling of wanting to be dangerous," she said. "You may know morally something's not right, but you can't help yourself." She has stated that the song "Dreamer" was written about a stalker in a tongue-in-cheek fashion, and it has been speculated that it was written specifically about Miakovsky.

== Artwork ==
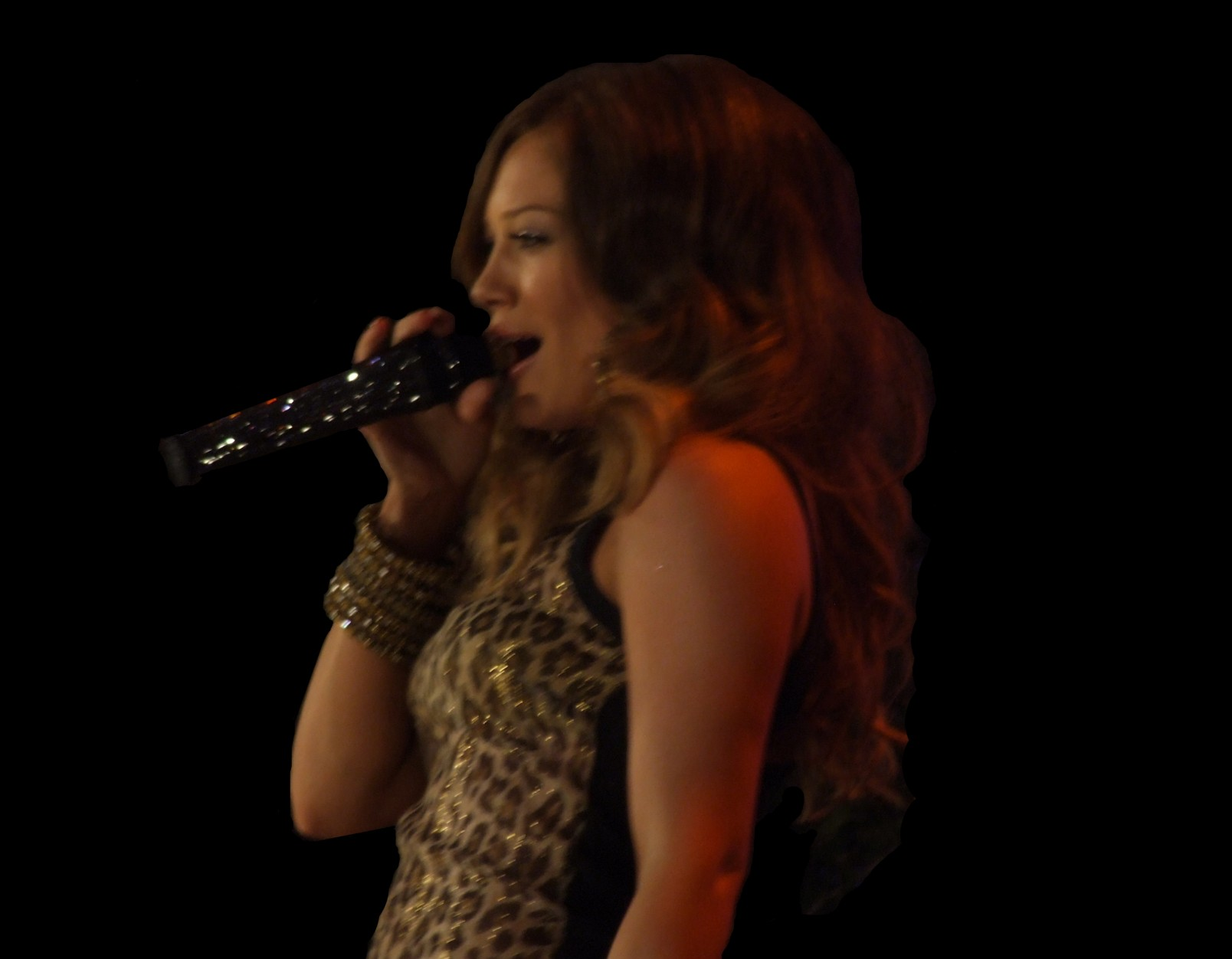
Duff perforiming "With Love" at 2007 MuchMusic Video Awards

The album's photography was done by Andrew Macpherson, in which a "newly brunette Duff wears grown-up black leather and diamonds," in line with its theme of "reinvention". The album artwork is a tightly framed portrait of Duff, with Stephen Thomas Erlewine of AllMusic opining: "From the soft-focused, impeccably styled, tasteful cover photo–better suited for Harper's Bazaar than a pop album [...] Dignity, appears to be the teen star's self-styled, self-conscious adult album. Almost too adult, actually, since the packaging makes it seem like Hilary skipped over her wild, restless years and headed straight toward polished adult contemporary blandness."

When asked by Westword if the artwork is a comment on how other celebrities should present themselves in the media, Duff stated: "The record cover is a big closeup of my face. It’s not like I have no clothes on or I’m trying to do something really edgy or provocative. [...] It’s not about anybody else. It’s my record and I would not ever want to try and make someone like me or say this is how you should be. I’m just saying this is how I am and this is how I want to be." Its artwork for the Japanese release was done by Leslie Kee, who captured her youthful appearance and "sexy" side as she transitioned into adulthood.

== Promotion ==
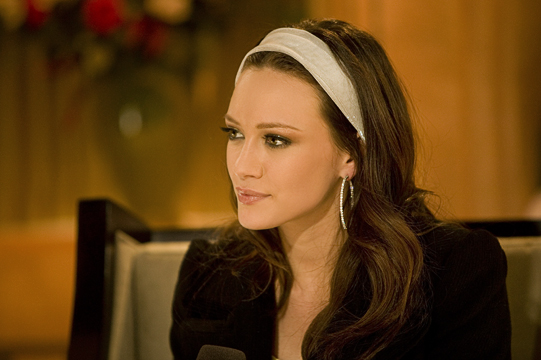
Duff on Live at Much in April 2007

To promote the album's release, Duff "worked tirelessly with the whole Hollywood Records staff to market [the] record." On the day of the album's release, April 3, MTV began airing the two-part documentary special, Hilary Duff: This Is Now. The documentary followed Duff as she prepared for the release of Dignity by attending photoshoots, interviews, wardrobe fittings, rehearsals and a trip to Europe. In addition, Duff hosted Total Request Live for the week of March 26, made several appearances at retail outlets and on television, and was given massive online coverage on MySpace and Yahoo!.

Accompanying Duff's new musical style, the record label began promoting her with a more mature image. Duff dyed her hair dark and "sexed-up" her image. According to Duff, she wanted to "try new things", but the image change "just happened. It is not like a conscious change. People think it is so different because they have watched me grow up but that is just what happens in life." Entertainment Weekly described Duff's new look as comprising "dark mane, dental veneers, luxe and vampy fashions". In mid-2007, concurrent to the preparation of the radio release of "Stranger", Duff was featured on the July covers of the magazines Us Weekly and Shape in a bikini, and on the August cover of Maxim accompanied by the declaration that she had gone "from the queen of teen to breakout sex symbol". The Associated Press wrote that Duff's more provocative image would help her singles to garner mainstream radio play. Guy Zapoleon, a radio consultant and former programmer for Top 40 radio, explained that "radio has a stigma about playing [Disney] acts, considering them teen and preteen in their appeal", and that Duff's provocative image would "definitely have a positive effect on the attitude of programmers, who are mostly male, as Disney tries to mature her image". A bonus EP containing five bonus remixes was released exclusively to US Walmart stores as a package with the album.

=== Singles ===
Three singles were released from the album. "Play with Fire" was released as the first single on August 21, 2006 which Duff considered to be a "tease" of Dignity's musical sound. Although she felt it was different from the album's other songs, she saw it as embodying the dance/electro/rock combination of the album, which influenced her decision to release it. Duff opted to release the song well in advance of the album "to give listeners a chance to get into my new sound". Though it failed to chart on the Billboard Hot 100, it charted on the magazine's Hot Dance Club Play chart, peaking at number 31. It was later released as a digital-only single on May 15, 2007 in a remixed form of the original version, with production by Richard Vission. The second single, "With Love" became her highest-peaking single on the Hot 100 when it reached number 24. The single reached number one on the Hot Dance Club Play chart. The third and final single, "Stranger", peaked at 97 on the Hot 100 and also reached the top of the dance charts.

=== Tour ===
To further promote the album, Duff embarked on her fourth concert tour, the Dignity Tour. Tickets for most of the leg sold out prior to the show. The tour began in Los Angeles, California on July 28, 2007, and closed in Melbourne, Australia on February 3, 2008. During the tour, Duff premiered a new song, "Reach Out", which was originally intended to be featured on a planned re-release of Dignity. The re-release never came to be, but the song was ultimately released on Duff's greatest hits album Best of Hilary Duff (2008).

Filming for the concert took place at Gibson Amphitheatre on August 15, 2007, and was exclusively released via the U.S. iTunes Store in 2010.

== Critical reception ==
Professional ratings
Review scores
Source	Rating
AllMusic	4/5 stars
Entertainment Weekly	B+
The Guardian	4/5 stars
Los Angeles Times	2.5/4 stars
Now	2/5 stars
PopMatters	(4/10)
Rolling Stone	3/5 stars
Slant Magazine	2.5/5 stars
Sputnikmusic	3/5 stars

Critical response to Dignity was generally positive. The album holds a score of 61/100 on music review website Metacritic, signifying generally favorable reviews. Rolling Stone gave a positive review of the album, feeling that Duff's attempt to make an adult-oriented dance-pop album was successful. About.com gave the album four out of five stars, called Duff "as likeable as ever" and praised the songwriting and production contributions of Richard Vission and will.i.am. AllMusic noted that the album was firmly based on "sturdy, hooky, and memorable" songwriting. The review claimed similarities between Dignity and Justin Timberlake's FutureSex/LoveSounds (2006), noting that Duff was musically fashionable but not a trendsetter. Entertainment Weekly noted that Duff's break-up with Madden brought out her personality, which the magazine felt was lacking in her previous work. The review noted: "She's never sounded less eager to please or more messily human."

The Guardian praised Duff's decision to opt for a more electronic dance sound as opposed to the teen pop of her previous work, despite the questionable marketability. They argued that some of the album's strongest tracks rivaled some by Kylie Minogue. Billboard called Duff's decision to make a dance-pop album daring, considering the unpopularity of the genre at the time. They described the album as "practically something straight out of the United Kingdom for all of its poppy goodness." IGN was critical of the genre shift on the album, saying it had "overly slick production."

Sputnikmusic felt that Duff's vocal performance on Dignity was indistinctive, but they also praised the songwriting on the album and said that it had a "fair bit of replay value". PopMatters believed her vocals were not on the level of her pop music peers such as Kelly Clarkson and Mandy Moore but noted that "thanks to the miracle of processing, reverb effects, and multi-tracking tricks to beef up her vocals, Duff's voice is still sweetly candy-coated enough to make the medicine go down." Slant Magazine described Duff's vocal performance as "nondescript", writing "the impish, quirky, or coolly disaffected vocal characteristics and sex appeal that make other dance-pop divas viable performers is nonexistent." Despite this, they still concluded that the album was "a huge step for Duff as an artist". IGN praised Duff's vocal performance on Dignity, saying "there's no question that Duff has a decent singing voice". Allmusic described Duff's vocals as sounding "thin, sweet, fragile, [and] not at all like a woman". They noted that "even if it's hard not to wish Hilary sounded closer to her age, with this small voice she still sounds relatable and, most of all, likeable."

== Commercial performance ==
Dignity debuted at number three on the US Billboard 200, selling 140,000 copies in its first week. The debut was lower than those of Duff's previous albums, each of which entered at either number one or two with opening week sales of around 200,000 copies. Billboard wrote that Duff's "continued evolution in sound and image ... may have resulted in her losing some of her much younger fans." The album has sold a total of 412,000 copies in the US by June, 2015. The album debuted at number twenty-five in the UK with first-week sales of over 8,000 copies. The album spent three weeks in the top seventy-five of the UK Albums Chart. Dignity broke Duff's streak of consecutive number-one debuts in Canada, entering the albums chart at number three with 20,000 copies sold. In response, Duff said she "couldn't be happier" and felt lucky that Dignity sold the amount it did, noting the state of the marketplace and the moderate sales figures for other albums that week. The album debuted at number seventeen on the ARIA Albums Chart in Australia, selling roughly 2,300 copies in its first week. The Herald Sun referred to it as "dead in the water" in its second week on the chart. In Italy, Dignity received a Gold certification from the FIMI for shipments to stores of more than 40,000 copies.

== Track listing ==
Dignity – Standard edition
No.	Title	Writer(s)	Producer(s)	Length
1.	"Stranger"	Hilary Duff; Kara DioGuardi; Vada Nobles; Derrick Haruin; Julius Diaz	Nobles; Haruin; Logic	4:11
2.	"Dignity"	Hilary Duff; DioGuardi; Chico Bennett; Richard Vission	Bennett; Vission	3:13
3.	"With Love"	Hilary Duff; DioGuardi; Nobles; Diaz	Nobles; Logic	3:01
4.	"Danger"	Hilary Duff; DioGuardi; Nobles; Mateo Camargo; Diaz	Nobles; Camargo; Logic^{[a]}	3:31
5.	"Gypsy Woman"	Hilary Duff; Haylie Duff; Ryan Tedder	Tedder	3:15
6.	"Never Stop"	Hilary Duff; DioGuardi; Bennett; Vission	Bennett; Vission; Victor Gonzalez^{[a]}	3:13
7.	"No Work, All Play"	Hilary Duff; DioGuardi; Greg Wells	Wells; DioGuardi	4:17
8.	"Between You and Me"	Hilary Duff; DioGuardi; Bennett; Vission	Bennett; Vission	3:05
9.	"Dreamer"	Hilary Duff; DioGuardi; "Fredwreck" Nassar	Nassar; DioGuardi	3:11
10.	"Happy"	Hilary Duff; DioGuardi; Mitch Allan; Rhett Lawrence	Bennett; Vission	3:29
11.	"Burned"	Hilary Duff; DioGuardi; Nassar	Nassar; DioGuardi	3:22
12.	"Outside of You"	Alecia Moore; Chantal Kreviazuk; Raine Maida	Bennett; Vission; Maida^{[b]}	4:04
13.	"I Wish"	Hilary Duff; DioGuardi; Tim Kelley; Bob Robinson	Tim & Bob	3:51
14.	"Play with Fire"	Hilary Duff; DioGuardi; Lawrence; will.i.am	Lawrence	3:01
Total length:				48:44

Dignity – European digital edition (bonus track)
No.	Title	Writer(s)	Producer(s)	Length
15.	"With Love" (Bimbo Jones Radio Edit)	Hilary Duff; DioGuardi; Nobles; Diaz	Nobles; Logic; Bimbo Jones^{[c]}	2:52
Total length:				51:36

Dignity – Italian digital edition (bonus track)
No.	Title	Writer(s)	Producer(s)	Length
15.	"With Love" (Boosta Dub Remix)	Hilary Duff; DioGuardi; Nobles; Diaz	Nobles; Logic; Boosta^{[c]}	6:35
Total length:				55:19

Dignity – Japanese edition (bonus track)
No.	Title	Writer(s)	Producer(s)	Length
15.	"With Love" (DJ Kaya Remix)	Hilary Duff; DioGuardi; Nobles; Diaz	Nobles; Logic; DJ Kaya^{[c]}	3:58
Total length:				52:42

Dignity – Best Buy edition (bonus tracks)
No.	Title	Writer(s)	Producer(s)	Length
15.	"Play with Fire" (Rock Mix)	Hilary Duff; DioGuardi; Lawrence; will.i.am	Lawrence	2:56
16.	"Stranger" (Vada Mix)	Hilary Duff; DioGuardi; Nobles; Haruin; Diaz	Nobles; Haruin; Logic	4:19
Total length:				55:59

Dignity – Walmart edition (bonus CD – Dignity Remixes EP)
No.	Title	Writer(s)	Producer(s)	Length
1.	"With Love" (Richard Vission Remix)	Hilary Duff; Kara DioGuardi; Vada Nobles; Julius Diaz	Nobles; Logic; Richard Vission^{[c]}; Chico Bennett^{[c]}	6:09
2.	"Play with Fire" (Richard Vission Remix)	Hilary Duff; DioGuardi; Rhett Lawrence; will.i.am	Lawrence; Vission^{[c]}; Bennett^{[c]}	3:13
3.	"Dignity" (Richard Vission Remix)	Hilary Duff; DioGuardi; Bennett; Vission	Bennett; Vission	3:45
4.	"Play with Fire" (Vada Mix)	Hilary Duff; DioGuardi; Lawrence; will.i.am	Lawrence; Nobles^{[c]}; Logic^{[c]}; Derrick Haruin^{[c]}	3:17
5.	"Come Clean" (Dance Mix)	DioGuardi; John Shanks	Shanks; Chris Cox^{[c]}	3:44
Total length:				20:08

Dignity – Deluxe edition DVD
No.	Title	Director(s)	Length
1.	"At Home with Hilary"		32:41
2.	"Why Not" (music video)	Elliott Lester	3:06
3.	"So Yesterday" (music video)	Chris Applebaum	3:34
4.	"Come Clean" (music video)	Dave Meyers	3:32
5.	"Our Lips Are Sealed" (music video)	Applebaum	2:41
6.	"Fly" (music video)	Applebaum	3:55
7.	"Wake Up" (music video)	Marc Webb	3:39
8.	"Beat of My Heart" (music video)	Phil Harder	3:10
9.	"Play with Fire" (music video)	Alex Courtes; Martin Fougerol	3:03
10.	"With Love" (music video)	Matthew Rolston	3:08
Total length:			62:28

Dignity – Japanese deluxe edition (bonus video)
No.	Title	Length
11.	"Hilary Duff x Leslie Key Making of the Photo Book"	3:35
Total length:		66:03

Notes

- ^{^a} signifies an additional producer
- ^{^b} signifies a co-producer
- ^{^c} signifies a remixer

== Personnel ==
Credits were adapted from AllMusic.

- Chico Bennett – producer
- Mateo Camargo – producer
- Kara DioGuardi – producer
- Hilary Duff – executive producer, lead and backing vocalist
- Víctor González – producer
- Tim & Bob – producer
- Jason Groucott – mixing
- Derrick Harvin – producer
- Richard "Segal" Huredia – mixing
- Alain Johannes – mixing
- Enny Joo – art direction and design
- Rhett Lawrence – producer, mixing
- Logic – producer, mixing
- Raine Maida – producer
- Manny Marroquin – mixing
- Andrew McPherson – photography
- Fredwreck – producer, mixing
- Vada Nobles – producer, mixing
- Andre Recke – executive producer, A&R, management
- Dave Snow – creative director
- Ryan Tedder – producer
- Richard Vission – producer
- Greg Wells – producer
- will.i.am – composer

== Charts ==
=== Weekly charts ===
Chart (2007)	Peak position
Argentine Albums (CAPIF)	1
Australian Albums (ARIA)	17
Canadian Albums (Billboard)	3
French Albums (SNEP)	133
Irish Albums (IRMA)	10
Italian Albums (FIMI)	8
Japanese Albums (Oricon)	12
Mexican Albums (AMPROFON)	22
New Zealand Albums (RMNZ)	31
Scottish Albums (Official Charts)	26
South African Albums (RISA)	13
Spanish Albums (Promusicae)	12
Swiss Albums (Schweizer Hitparade)	64
UK Albums (Official Charts)	25
US Billboard 200	3

=== Monthly charts ===
Chart (2007)	Peak position
Argentine Albums (CAPIF)	15

=== Year-end charts ===
Chart (2007)	Position
US Billboard 200	151

== Certifications ==
Region	Certification	Certified units/sales
Ireland (IRMA)	Gold	7,500^{^}
Italy (FIMI)	Gold	40,000^{*}
South Korea	—	1,801
United States (RIAA)	Gold	500,000^{^}
^{*} Sales figures based on certification alone.^{^} Shipments figures based on certification alone.

== Release history ==
Country	Date	Edition	Label
Italy	March 21, 2007	Standard; deluxe edition	Virgin
United Kingdom	March 26, 2007	Standard; deluxe edition	EMI
Spain	March 26, 2007	Standard; deluxe edition	EMI
Japan	March 28, 2007	Standard; limited edition	Avex Trax
Austria	March 30, 2007	Standard; deluxe edition	EMI
Germany	March 30, 2007	Standard; deluxe edition	EMI
Switzerland	March 30, 2007	Standard; deluxe edition	EMI
Australia	March 31, 2007	Standard edition	EMI
Canada	April 3, 2007	Standard; deluxe edition	Universal
United States	April 3, 2007	Standard; deluxe edition	Hollywood
Australia	January 19, 2008	Deluxe tour edition	EMI
