= Reach Out (Hilary Duff song) =

2008 single by Hilary Duff

Single by Hilary Duff

from the album Best of Hilary Duff
- Released: October 27, 2008
- Recorded: 2007
- Studio: Jungle Room Studios (Glendale, CA)
- Length: 4:16
- Label: Hollywood
- Songwriters: Martin Gore; Ryan Tedder; Evan Bogart; Mika Guillory
- Producer: Ryan "Alias" Tedder

Hilary Duff singles chronology
"Stranger" (2007)	"Reach Out" (2008)	"Chasing the Sun" (2014)

Music video
- "Hilary Duff - Reach Out" on YouTube

"Reach Out" is a song recorded by American singer Hilary Duff from her first greatest hits album, Best of Hilary Duff (2008). It was released on October 27, 2008, by Hollywood Records as the only single from the album. The song was initially recorded for inclusion on a scrapped re-release of Duff's fourth studio album Dignity (2007). The song features uncredited vocals from American rapper R. Prophet. It was written by Martin Gore, Ryan "Alias" Tedder, Evan Bogart, Mika Guillory and produced by Tedder.

== Background and production ==
Hilary Duff said in September 2007 that a previously unheard song on the Dignity Tour's set list, "Reach Out", would be released as a single. In an interview with Joe Bermudez in November 2007, Duff revealed that her fourth studio album, Dignity, would be re-released. The re-release would feature remixes of the original songs alongside "two or three" new recordings, including "Reach Out" and "Holiday". In January 2009, Duff said that she had been "saving" the song for use on an entirely new record, but instead Hollywood Records chose to include it on and release Best of Hilary Duff against her wishes.

The song was produced by Ryan "Alias" Tedder and co-written by Tedder, Evan Bogart, and Mika Guillory. It is built around a sample of Depeche Mode's 1989 song "Personal Jesus", written by Martin Gore. On the final episode of MTV's Total Request Live, Duff described the song by saying that "[i]t's different for me. It's a little dancey, and there's a rapper named R. Prophet who's on it who's really cool and kinda fresh".

== Critical response ==
The song received mixed reviews from critics upon its release. Popjustice gave the song a negative review, stating that "[w]ith so much medocrity in the song's three-and-a-half minute duration it's hard to pinpoint the most useless and perfunctory thing about Hilary Duff's toweringly boring new, track 'Reach Out'. E! Online called "Reach Out" a "muffed attempt". Digital Spy said that "The fact that Duff replaces the original lyric "reach out and touch faith" with "reach out and touch me" pretty much says it all. Originally written about Elvis's love for his wife Priscilla, the Lizzie McGuire star sacrilegiously turns this into an innuendo-laden squelch-fest. Accompanied by a video that sees Duff humping a marble statue, a tree trunk and the camera, 'Reach Out' has an unpleasant whiff of desperation about it". However, AllMusic gave the song a positive review, picking the song as one of the top 3 AMG Picks in the album.

NewMusicReviews gave the two versions of "Reach Out" a seven out of ten rating, calling Duff's version a "great updated version of a classic track [Depeche Mode's "Personal Jesus"]. The dance remixes are fantastic and this should bang the clubs, and could do decent on the radio." They also praised The Prophet's rapping parts stating he "has got some decent lyrics, but he's not featured on much of the track." Andy H of Angryape (UK) said the song "should do well, no doubt there – considering the current trend of electro-pop, with the club beat, rocky guitar sample and a confident sexiness in the vocals." RightCelebrity said "while some are liking the new mature, sexy Hilary Duff, some say she tried too hard, and original songs are always better. You always get the haters when you do a remake, so it is always risky." Commonsensemedia called "Reach Out" a "hit single" that "features more aggressive sexual lyrics than on previous [Hilary Duff] albums. While Dignity was OK for 11 year olds, the Best Of [Hilary Duff] compilation pushes the target age higher." Bill Lamb from About.com praised the production on "Reach Out" writing "Duff's new pop lyrics and vocals courtesy collaboration with Ryan Tedder, leader of OneRepublic and one of the hottest producers in the pop music industry."

== Chart performance ==
The single received frequent airplay in U.S. nightclubs, peaking at number one on the Billboard Hot Dance Club Play chart—it was Duff's fourth entry on the chart, and her third consecutive number-one single.

== Music video ==
The music video for "Reach Out" was filmed on September 13–14, 2008 in Los Angeles and was directed by Philip Andelman. The video premiered on MySpace on October 28, 2008. About.com said that "the video is cute, minus the extraneous rap".

The video opens with scantily-clad people streaking in the backyard of a mansion, then shows R. Prophet rapping in front of a fountain. Light BDSM references are briefly shown with flashes of Duff's wrists being tied and Duff being blindfolded. There are scenes of Duff dancing in front of a mirror and sitting on a sofa wearing a long white dress; in the same room she can be seen holding a shirtless man's leg. In another scene Duff can be seen at a dining table which is covered with food. Later she is shown with red lipstick lying on the floor and singing, intercut with scenes of her caressing the shirtless man. During Prophet's rap, he is sitting on a throne chair while Duff is singing in a pool while wearing a dress. At the climax of the song, Duff can be seen sucking a man's thumb. The video is intercut with various scenes of Duff caressing a statue and rubbing against the wall. The video ends with more footage of Duff sitting on the dinner table and more scenes of people running outside in undergarments.

The international version does not include the light BDSM references or the thumb sucking scenes and the ending is slightly different. It replaces these scenes with more of Duff on the table with the food and new scenes of Duff singing under a pool table.

== Track listing ==
Digital download
No.	Title	Length
1.	"Reach Out"	4:16
2.	"Reach Out" (Richard Vission Remix)	6:17
Total length:		10:33

== Charts ==
Chart (2008–2009)	Peak position
Australia (ARIA)	51
Italy (FIMI)	3
Japan Hot 100 (Billboard)	72
Mexico Ingles Airplay (Billboard)	6
US Dance Club Songs (Billboard)	1

== Release history ==
Region	Date	Format	Label
Australia	October 27, 2008	Contemporary hit radio	EMI
France	January 18, 2009	Digital download	EMI
Finland	January 18, 2009	Digital download	EMI
Ireland	January 18, 2009	Digital download	EMI
Italy	January 18, 2009	Digital download	EMI
Netherlands	January 18, 2009	Digital download	EMI
United Kingdom	January 18, 2009	Digital download	EMI
Spain	January 18, 2009	Digital download	EMI
Various	November 7, 2025	7-inch	Hollywood

== See also ==
- List of number-one dance singles of 2008 (U.S.)
