= Little Shocks =

Single by Kaiser Chiefs

from the album The Future Is Medieval
- Released: 30 May 2011
- Genre: Indie rock, post-punk revival
- Length: 3:42
- Label: Polydor
- Songwriters: Nick Hodgson, Ricky Wilson, Simon Rix, Nick Baines, Andrew "Whitey" White
- Producer: Tony Visconti

Kaiser Chiefs singles chronology
"Good Days Bad Days" (2008)	"Little Shocks" (2011)	"Man on Mars" (2011)

"Little Shocks" is a song by English indie rock band Kaiser Chiefs, taken from their fourth studio album The Future Is Medieval (2011). The song was written by Nick Hodgson, Ricky Wilson, Simon Rix, Nick Baines, and Andrew "Whitey" White. It was produced by Tony Visconti. It bubbled under at number 179 on the UK Singles Chart. The song was released and premiered on Zane Lowe's then-BBC Radio 1 programme on 30 May 2011.

== Music video ==
A music video to accompany the release of "Little Shocks" was released on the same day, and was directed by Jamie Roberts. It is three minutes and fifty-two seconds long, and it features electrically based physics equipment, such as a Tesla coil behind the band, and Ricky Wilson in a Faraday cage.

== Track listing ==
Promo CD-Single
No.	Title	Length
1.	"Little Shocks"	3:37

Album version
No.	Title	Length
1.	"Little Shocks"	3:42

== Chart performance ==
Chart (2011)	Peak position
Belgium (Ultratip Bubbling Under Flanders)	13
UK Singles (The Official Charts Company)	179
