= Man on Mars (song) =

Single by Kaiser Chiefs

from the album The Future Is Medieval
- Released: 1 August 2011
- Genre: Indie rock, post-punk revival
- Length: 3:48
- Label: Polydor
- Songwriters: Nick Hodgson, Ricky Wilson, Simon Rix, Nick Baines, Andrew "Whitey" White
- Producers: Tony Visconti, Nick Hodgson

Kaiser Chiefs singles chronology
"Little Shocks" (2011)	"Man on Mars" (2011)	"Kinda Girl You Are" (2011)

"Man on Mars" is a song by English indie rock band Kaiser Chiefs, taken from their fourth studio album The Future Is Medieval (2011). It is the only Kaiser Chiefs single to feature then-drummer Nick Hodgson on lead vocals.

== Music video ==
A music video to accompany the release of "Man on Mars" was first released onto YouTube on 16 August 2011 at a total length of four minutes. The video, directed by Sara Dunlop, consists entirely of footage of Kaiser Chiefs' trip to Japan, including footage of fans singing karaoke and some brief clips of their performance at Fuji Rock Festival 2011.

== Track listing ==
Promo CD-Single
No.	Title	Length
1.	"Man on Mars"	3:48

Album version
No.	Title	Length
1.	"Man on Mars"	4:10

== Chart performance ==
Chart (2011)	Peak position
Belgium (Ultratip Bubbling Under Flanders)	46
