= Off with Their Heads (album) =

Studio album by Kaiser Chiefs
- Released: 20 October 2008
- Recorded: 2007–2008
- Studio: RAK & Eastcote Studios, London
- Genre: Indie rock
- Length: 35:36
- Label: B-Unique; Universal Motown
- Producer: Mark Ronson; Eliot James

Kaiser Chiefs chronology
Yours Truly, Angry Mob (2007)	Off with Their Heads (2008)	Live at Elland Road (2008)

Singles from Off with Their Heads
- 1. "Never Miss a Beat" Released: 27 August 2008; 2. "Good Days Bad Days" Released: 15 December 2008

Professional ratings
Aggregate scores
Source	Rating
Metacritic	70/100
Review scores
Source	Rating
AllMusic	4/5 stars
BBC	Favourable
The Guardian	4/5 stars
The Independent	2/5 stars
musicOMH	2.5/5 stars
NME	5/10
Pitchfork Media	6.8/10
Q	4/5 stars
Rolling Stone	4/5 stars
The Times	4/5 stars

Off with Their Heads is the third studio album by English rock band Kaiser Chiefs, and was released on 20 October 2008 in the UK, and on 25 August 2009 in the United States. The lead single from the album was "Never Miss a Beat", released two months before the album. The album charted at number two on the UK Albums Chart during the week of 26 October 2008 and at number 16 in the Irish Albums Chart of the week of 24 October.

== Background ==
The album features guest appearances from several artists, including Lily Allen who provides backing vocals on "Always Happens Like That" and "Never Miss a Beat". She previously covered "Oh My God" on her second mixtape and later with Mark Ronson on his album Version. Three members of the English indie band New Young Pony Club also feature on backing vocals on "Never Miss a Beat", Sway DaSafo raps one verse of "Half the Truth", and James Bond composer David Arnold, who performed with the band at 2007's BBC Electric Proms, also appears on the album.

"Never Miss a Beat" and "You Want History" premiered on the band's UK Arena Tour in the Winter of 2007. The lyric "Off with their heads" appears in the first verse of "Like It Too Much". The album was uploaded with 30 second previews of each song, apart from "Never Miss a Beat" which included a full recording, on the music social networking site Last.fm on 9 October 2008. "Never Miss A Beat" appeared on Pro Evolution 2010, as did previous single Ruby, from Yours Truly, Angry Mob.

== Reception ==
- Allmusic – 4 stars out of 5 – "The band rails against stupidity and conformity like they did on Yours Truly, Angry Mob, but this time they know that while it's smart to be witty, it's even smarter to be insidiously catchy."
- Rolling Stone (p. 126) – 4 stars out of 5 – "Off With Their Heads is great British pop in the dynamic lethal-irony tradition of the mid-Sixties Kinks, the early Jam and, with that vintage-New Wave tone of Nick Baines' keyboards, XTC's 1979 album, Drums and Wires."
- Rolling Stone (p. 91) – Ranked #21 in Rolling Stone's 50 Best Albums of 2008.
- Alternative Press (p. 146) – 4 stars out of 5 – "'Addicted to Drugs' is brilliant, from its cheeky quotes of Robert Palmer's 'Addicted to Love' to Wilson's darkly comic portrayal of junkies in love."
- Mojo (p. 104) – 3 stars out of 5 – "[T]heir third album is again packed with the sort of boisterous melodies and niggling synth-hooks that can top charts and fill stadiums."
- Clash (p. 121) – "'Half the Truth' somehow pulls off a charming Blackpool pier sound and even concludes with a little unexpected grime."

== Track listing ==
All tracks written by Kaiser Chiefs.

No.	Title	Length
1.	"Spanish Metal"	2:19
2.	"Never Miss a Beat"	3:08
3.	"Like It Too Much"	3:23
4.	"You Want History"	3:46
5.	"Can't Say What I Mean"	2:49
6.	"Good Days Bad Days"	2:53
7.	"Tomato in the Rain"	3:51
8.	"Half the Truth"	3:44
9.	"Always Happens Like That"	3:12
10.	"Addicted to Drugs"	3:53
11.	"Remember You're a Girl"	2:38

Japanese bonus tracks
No.	Title	Length
12.	"Sooner or Later"	3:14
13.	"How Do You Feel About That"	3:35

Deluxe edition bonus disc
No.	Title	Length
1.	"Can't Say What I Mean" (Live at Elland Road)	3:27
2.	"Never Miss a Beat" (Live at Elland Road)	3:12
3.	"You Want History" (Live at Elland Road)	3:48
4.	"Half the Truth" (Live at Elland Road)	4:12

== Personnel ==
- Ricky Wilson – vocals
- Andrew White – guitar
- Simon Rix – bass
- Nick Baines – keyboards
- Nick Hodgson – drums, backing vocals, lead vocals on "Remember You're a Girl"
- Lily Allen – backing vocals ("Never Miss a Beat"), guest vocals ("Always Happens Like That")
- Anne-Marie Chirema – backing vocals ("Never Miss a Beat", "You Want History")
- Lou Hayter – backing vocals ("Never Miss a Beat", "You Want History")
- Sarah Jones – backing vocals ("Never Miss a Beat", "You Want History")
- Thomas Bowes – violin ("Like It Too Much")
- Ralph De Souza – violin ("Like It Too Much")
- Jonathan Evans-Jones – violin ("Like It Too Much")
- Peter Hanson – violin ("Like It Too Much")
- Ian Humphries – violin ("Like It Too Much")
- Steve Morris – violin ("Like It Too Much")
- Helen Paterson – violin ("Like It Too Much")
- Tom Pigott-Smith – violin ("Like It Too Much")
- Rose Warren-Green – violin ("Like It Too Much")
- Debbie Widdup – violin ("Like It Too Much")
- Garfield Jackson – viola ("Like It Too Much")
- Andy Parker – viola ("Like It Too Much")
- Jon Thorne – viola ("Like It Too Much")
- Jonathan Williams – cello ("Like It Too Much")
- Tony Lewis – cello ("Like It Too Much")
- Paul Kegg – cello ("Like It Too Much")
- David Lloyd – djembe ("Good Days Bad Days")
- Dave Guy – trumpet ("Tomato in the Rain")
- Sway – guest vocals ("Half the Truth")
- Alex Fraser – kettle drum ("Half the Truth")
- Mark Ronson – producer, engineer, agogo bells ("Addicted to Drugs")
- Eliot James – producer, engineer
- Raj Das – assistant engineer
- Tim Goalen – assistant engineer ("Never Miss a Beat", "Like It Too Much", "You Want History")
- Samuel Navel – assistant engineer
- Tom Morris – assistant engineer
- Andy Wallace – mixing ("Spanish Metal", "Never Miss a Beat", "You Want History", "Can't Say What I Mean", "Tomato in the Rain", "Half the Truth", "Addicted to Drugs", "Remember You're a Girl")
- John O'Mahoney – mix engineer ("Spanish Metal", "Never Miss a Beat", "You Want History", "Can't Say What I Mean", "Tomato in the Rain", "Half the Truth", "Addicted to Drugs", "Remember You're a Girl")
- Jan Petrov – mix assistant ("Spanish Metal", "Never Miss a Beat", "You Want History", "Can't Say What I Mean", "Tomato in the Rain", "Half the Truth", "Addicted to Drugs", "Remember You're a Girl")
- Cenzo Townshend – mixing ("Like It Too Much", "Good Days Bad Days", "Always Happens Like That")
- Neil Comber – mix assistant ("Like It Too Much", "Good Days Bad Days", "Always Happens Like That")
- John Davies – mastering
- Geoff Foster – strings recording ("Like It Too Much")
- Chris Barrett – assistant engineer ("Like It Too Much")
- David Arnold – string arrangement ("Like It Too Much")

== Charts ==
=== Weekly charts ===
Chart (2008)	Peak position
Australian Albums (ARIA)	12
Austrian Albums (Ö3 Austria)	25
Belgian Albums (Ultratop Flanders)	11
Belgian Albums (Ultratop Wallonia)	36
Canadian Albums (Nielsen SoundScan)	50
Dutch Albums (Album Top 100)	16
French Albums (SNEP)	58
German Albums (Offizielle Top 100)	29
Irish Albums (IRMA)	16
New Zealand Albums (RMNZ)	34
Norwegian Albums (VG-lista)	29
Scottish Albums (OCC)	5
Spanish Albums (Promusicae)	69
Swiss Albums (Schweizer Hitparade)	19
UK Albums (OCC)	2
US Billboard 200	55
US Indie Store Album Sales (Billboard)	12
US Top Alternative Albums (Billboard)	13
US Top Rock Albums (Billboard)	20

=== Year-end charts ===
Chart (2008)	Position
UK Albums (OCC)	111

== Certifications ==
Region	Certification	Certified units/sales
United Kingdom (BPI)	Gold	100,000^{^}
^{^} Shipments figures based on certification alone.
