= The Future Is Medieval =

The Future Is Medieval / Start the Revolution Without Me

Studio album by Kaiser Chiefs
- Released: 3 June 2011
- Recorded: 2009–2011
- Genres: Indie rock; power pop
- Length: 53:42 (The Future Is Medieval); 47:22 (Start the Revolution Without Me)
- Labels: Fiction, B-Unique, Universal Music
- Producers: Tony Visconti, Ethan Johns

Kaiser Chiefs chronology
Live at Elland Road (2008)	The Future Is Medieval / Start the Revolution Without Me (2011)	Souvenir: The Singles 2004–2012 (2012)

Singles from The Future Is Medieval
- 1. "Little Shocks" Released: 30 May 2011; 2. "Man on Mars" Released: 1 August 2011; 3. "Kinda Girl You Are" Released: 28 October 2011

Singles from Start the Revolution Without Me
- 1. "On the Run" Released: 24 January 2012

Professional ratings
Aggregate scores
Source	Rating
Metacritic	60/100
Review scores
Source	Rating
AllMusic	2.5/5 stars
BBC	7/10 stars
The Independent	3/5 stars
Paste	(7/10)

The Future Is Medieval is the fourth studio album released by English rock band Kaiser Chiefs. The album was made available through the band's official website on 3 June 2011, before being released in shops on 27 June. It is the final album to feature original drummer Nick Hodgson before his departure from the band in December 2012. The album was later re-issued in North America, under the new title Start the Revolution Without Me. This version of the album was released on 6 March 2012, and includes the brand new track "On the Run", plus tracks previously only available on the digital version of the album. Around the same time, a special limited edition vinyl box set was released through the band's official website in the United Kingdom, containing the entire twenty-three tracks from the digital deluxe version of the album, spread across four 10" vinyl records.

== Background ==
Just days before the album was announced, a music video for the track "Little Shocks" was released online via the band's official website. The album's title is taken from the lyrics of the track "Child of the Jago". The album was uniquely promoted in the United Kingdom, as copies purchased from the band's website from 3 June could contain a track listing chosen by the purchaser. Each album could contain ten of any of the twenty-three tracks available on the digital deluxe version of the album, and each individual album artwork could be edited to the purchaser's design. Purchasers could also share their version of the album, and for every other buyer who chooses to purchase their version, they earn £1.

== Track listing ==
=== The Future Is Medieval ===
All tracks written by Kaiser Chiefs.

No.	Title	Length
1.	"Little Shocks"	3:42
2.	"Things Change"	3:45
3.	"Long Way from Celebrating"	3:02
4.	"Starts with Nothing"	5:31
5.	"Out of Focus"	4:09
6.	"Dead or in Serious Trouble"	2:37
7.	"When All Is Quiet"	3:27
8.	"Kinda Girl You Are"	2:36
9.	"Man on Mars"	4:14
10.	"Child of the Jago"	4:41
11.	"Heard It Break"	3:07
12.	"Coming Up for Air"	5:35
13.	"If You Will Have Me"	3:25
14.	"Howlaround" (hidden track on UK pressings after "If You Will Have Me")	3:51

Japanese edition bonus track
No.	Title	Length
15.	"I Dare You" (alternative mix)	2:31

iTunes deluxe edition bonus tracks
No.	Title	Length
14.	"City"	4:07
15.	"Howlaround"	3:51

Vinyl Edition
No.	Title	Length
1.	"Howlaround"	3:51
2.	"Little Shocks"	3:42
3.	"My Place Is Here"	4:04
4.	"Kinda Girl You Are"	2:36
5.	"Fly on the Wall"	4:34
6.	"Back in December"	3:41
7.	"Starts with Nothing"	5:31
8.	"Problem Solved"	3:01
9.	"Out of Focus"	4:09
10.	"Man on Mars"	4:14
11.	"Coming Up for Air"	5:35
12.	"Heard It Break"	3:07
13.	"Saying Something"	4:06
14.	"City"	4:07
15.	"Dead or in Serious Trouble"	2:37
16.	"When All Is Quiet"	3:27
17.	"Child of the Jago"	4:41
18.	"Things Change"	3:45
19.	"Long Way from Celebrating"	3:02
20.	"I Dare You"	3:56
21.	"Cousin in the Bronx"	3:32
22.	"Can't Mind My Own Business"	3:47
23.	"If You Will Have Me"	3:25

=== Start the Revolution Without Me ===
No.	Title	Length
1.	"Little Shocks"	3:42
2.	"On the Run"	4:02
3.	"Heard It Break"	3:07
4.	"Kinda Girl You Are"	2:36
5.	"Starts with Nothing"	5:31
6.	"When All Is Quiet"	3:27
7.	"Cousin in the Bronx"	3:32
8.	"Things Change"	3:45
9.	"Man on Mars" (radio edit)	3:44
10.	"Problem Solved"	3:01
11.	"Can't Mind My Own Business"	3:47
12.	"Child of the Jago"	4:41
13.	"If You Will Have Me"	3:25

== Personnel ==
- Ricky Wilson – vocals
- Andrew White – guitar
- Nick Hodgson – drums, backing vocals, lead vocals on "Man on Mars" and "If You Will Have Me"
- Simon Rix – bass
- Nick "Peanut" Baines – keyboards
- Tony Visconti – producer, engineer
- Ethan Johns – producer, engineer
- David Arnold – additional strings on several tracks
- Tim Hodgson – additional lyrics on "If You Will Have Me"

== Chart performance ==
Chart (2011)	Peak position
Australian Albums (ARIA)	25
Belgian Albums (Ultratop Flanders)	34
Belgian Albums (Ultratop Wallonia)	37
Dutch Albums (Album Top 100)	40
Spanish Albums (Promusicae)	95
Swiss Albums (Schweizer Hitparade)	83
UK Albums (Official Charts)	10
