= Alex and Martin =

French music video director duo

Alex and Martin were a French music video directing duo consisting of Alex Courtes and Martin Fougerol. They directed several music videos with artists such as The White Stripes and U2.

They won a Grammy Award in 2005 in the Best Short Form Music Video category for directing the music video for "Vertigo" by U2.

They have disbanded, and both continue to direct alone. Courtes directed 2011 the French-Belgian horror-thriller The Incident.

== Music video filmography ==
- Cassius - "Cassius 99" (1999)
- Morgan - "Miss Parker" (1999)
- Phoenix - "If I Ever Feel Better" (2001)
- Air - "Radio Number 1" (2001)
- Noir Désir - "Le vent nous portera"
- Bran Van 3000 - "Love Cliché"
- Cassius with Jocelyn Brown - "I Am a Woman" (2002)
- Cassius with Steve Edwards - "The Sound of Violence" (2002)
- Jane's Addiction - "Just Because" (2003)
- M - "Qui de nous deux" (2003)
- The White Stripes - "Seven Nation Army" (2003)
- Stereophonics - "Moviestar" (2004)
- Étienne Daho and Charlotte Gainsbourg - "If" (2004)
- U2 - "Vertigo" (2004)
- U2 - "City of Blinding Lights" (2005)
- Kylie Minogue - "Giving You Up" (2005)
- Jamiroquai - "(Don't) Give Hate a Chance" (2005)
- Franz Ferdinand - "The Fallen" (2006)
- Wolfmother - "Woman" (2006)
- Hilary Duff - "Play with Fire" (2006)
- Kasabian - "Shoot the Runner" (2006)
- Calogero - "Le saut de l'ange" (2007)

=== Martin Fougerol ===
- B'z - "Super Love Song" (2007)
- B'z - "Burn (Fumetsu no Face)" (2008)
- Foo Fighters - "Let It Die" (2008) (unreleased)
- B'z - "Ichibu to Zeunbu" (2009)

=== Alex Courtes ===
- Snow Patrol - "Take Back the City" (2008)
- Kaiser Chiefs - "Good Days Bad Days" (2008)
- U2 - "Get On Your Boots" (2009)
- U2 - "Magnificent" (2009)
- Alice in Chains - "Check My Brain" (2009)
- Justice - "On'n'On" (2012)
- Sébastien Tellier - "Cochon Ville" (2012)
- Willy Moon - "Yeah Yeah" (2012)
- Jackson and His Computerband - "Dead Living Things" (2013)
- Kasabian - "bumblebeee" (2014)
- Cassius featuring Cat Power and Pharrell Williams - "Go Up" (2017)
- Justice - "Pleasure" (2017)
