= Never Miss a Beat =

2008 single by Kaiser Chiefs

Single by Kaiser Chiefs

from the album Off with Their Heads
- Released: 27 August 2008
- Genre: Alternative rock; pop rock
- Length: 3:08
- Label: B-Unique; Polydor
- Songwriters: Ricky Wilson; Andrew White; Simon Rix; Nick Baines; Nick Hodgson
- Producers: Mark Ronson; Eliot James

Kaiser Chiefs singles chronology
"Love's Not a Competition (But I'm Winning)" (2007)	"Never Miss a Beat" (2008)	"Good Days Bad Days" (2008)

Music video
- "Never Miss a Beat" on YouTube

"Never Miss a Beat" is a song by British indie rock band Kaiser Chiefs, released as the lead single from the band's third album, Off with Their Heads, on 27 August 2008. The song was co-produced by Mark Ronson and Eliot James and features backing vocals from Lily Allen and members of rock group New Young Pony Club.

"Never Miss a Beat" premiered on BBC Radio 1's The Chris Moyles Show that day. On 17 September 2008, it was added to Radio 1's A List. On 12 October, the song entered the UK Singles Chart at No. 5, giving the band their second UK top-five single as well as their fifth to enter the UK top 10. In the United States, the song was sent to modern rock radio in September 2008, and it was released on physical formats in the United Kingdom and Australia in October.

== Music video ==
The music video was directed by Goodtimes and was released on 6 October 2008, coinciding with its physical release. The video shows the band performing in The Barge Pole Public House, based in Abbey Wood, South East London, with sporadic glimpses of people wearing masks occurring frequently throughout. These scenes were filmed around the Tavy Bridge area of Thamesmead, South East London. Ricky Wilson plays a weather man, and appears on a television next to the band.

== Track listings ==
UK CD single

1. "Never Miss a Beat"
2. "Sooner or Later"

UK and US 7-inch single

1. "Never Miss a Beat" – 3:07
2. "How Do You Feel About That?" – 3:36

Australian CD single

1. "Never Miss a Beat"
2. "Sooner or Later"
3. "Never Miss a Beat" (Yuksek Remix)
4. "Never Miss a Beat" (RAC Remix)

== Charts ==
=== Weekly charts ===
Chart (2008)	Peak position
Australia (ARIA)	47
Austria (Ö3 Austria Top 40)	65
Belgium (Ultratop 50 Flanders)	47
Belgium (Ultratip Bubbling Under Wallonia)	18
Czech Republic Airplay (ČNS IFPI)	33
Europe (Eurochart Hot 100)	17
Germany (GfK)	76
Ireland (IRMA)	49
Japan (Japan Hot 100)	42
Netherlands (Single Top 100)	74
Scotland Singles (OCC)	7
Switzerland Airplay (Schweizer Hitparade)	49
UK Singles (OCC)	5

=== Year-end charts ===
Chart (2008)	Position
UK Singles (OCC)	144

== Certifications ==
Region	Certification	Certified units/sales
United Kingdom (BPI)	Gold	400,000^{‡}
^{‡} Sales+streaming figures based on certification alone.

== Release history ==
Region	Date	Format(s)	Label(s)	Ref(s).
United Kingdom	27 August 2008	Radio debut	B-Unique; Universal Motown	
United States	8 September 2008	Modern rock radio	B-Unique; Universal Motown	
Australia	6 October 2008	CD	Liberator Music	
United Kingdom	6 October 2008	7-inch vinyl; CD	B-Unique; Polydor	

== Usage in other media ==
The song was used on the official website for Formula One, as the background music for the video highlights of the 2008 Japanese Grand Prix. This song was used for the soundtrack in the games MLB 09: The Show, Tap Tap Revenge, and Pro Evolution Soccer 2010. It is playable in Guitar Hero 5, and was also in the film Diary of a Wimpy Kid.

Channel Ten used the song during advertisements promoting its 2009 Australian Football League coverage on its main channel, as well as its High Definition channel One HD.
