= Kinda Girl You Are =

Single by Kaiser Chiefs

from the album The Future Is Medieval
- Released: 28 October 2011
- Genre: Indie rock
- Length: 2:36
- Label: Polydor
- Songwriters: Nick Hodgson, Ricky Wilson, Simon Rix, Nick Baines, Andrew "Whitey" White
- Producer: Ethan Johns

Kaiser Chiefs singles chronology
"Man on Mars" (2011)	"Kinda Girl You Are" (2011)	"On the Run" (2012)

"Kinda Girl You Are" is a song by English indie rock band Kaiser Chiefs, taken from their fourth studio album The Future Is Medieval (2011). It was released in the United Kingdom as a digital download on 28 October 2011.

== Music video ==
A music video to accompany the release of "Kinda Girl You Are" was first released onto YouTube on 1 November 2011 at a total length of two minutes and fifty-one seconds. Directed by Dan Sully, it depicts the antics of a girl gang consisting of lookalikes of Beyoncé, Lady Gaga, and Britney Spears. The band members are featured only briefly, in a car that stops next to the car the three women are in.

== Track listing ==
Digital download
No.	Title	Length
1.	"Kinda Girl You Are"	2:36

== Release history ==
Region	Date	Format	Label
United Kingdom	28 October 2011	Digital Download	Polydor Records
