= Pon de Replay =

2005 single by Rihanna

Single by Rihanna

from the album Music of the Sun
- B-side: "Should I?"
- Released: May 24, 2005
- Recorded: 2004
- Studio: The Loft (Bronxville, New York)
- Genre: Pop; dancehall; R&B
- Length: 4:06 (album version); 3:34 (radio edit)
- Label: Def Jam; SRP
- Songwriters: Alisha Brooks; Vada Nobles; Carl Sturken; Evan Rogers
- Producers: Vada Nobles; Carl Sturken; Evan Rogers

Rihanna singles chronology
"Pon de Replay" (2005)	"If It's Lovin' that You Want" (2005)

Music video
- "Pon de Replay" on YouTube

"Pon de Replay" is the debut single by the Barbadian singer Rihanna from her debut album, Music of the Sun (2005). It was written and produced by Vada Nobles, Alisha "M'Jestie" Brooks, Carl Sturken and Evan Rogers. The song was released on May 24, 2005, as the lead single from the album. Prior to signing a six-album record deal with Def Jam Recordings, "Pon de Replay" was one of three songs which was recorded for her demo tape to be sent to record labels. It is a pop, dancehall and R&B song that features elements of dance-pop, big-band jazz, reggae, and reggaeton. The lyrics revolve around Rihanna asking a DJ to turn the volume of her favorite songs up louder. The title means "play it again" in Bajan Creole.

"Pon de Replay" received positive reviews from music critics, who praised the song's composition and its choice as the singer's debut single. The song was a commercial success, peaking at number one in New Zealand and the top five in Austria, Belgium, Denmark, Hungary, Ireland, Norway, Scotland, Sweden, Switzerland, the United Kingdom, and the United States. It has also obtained multi-platinum certifications in Australia, New Zealand, the United Kingdom, and the United States. The song's accompanying music video was directed by Little X, and features Rihanna in a club with her friends, who ask the DJ to play their favorite song repeatedly.

== Background ==
Prior to signing a record deal with Def Jam Recordings, Rihanna was discovered in her home country of Barbados by American record producer Evan Rogers, who made the necessary arrangements for her to fly to New York. There, she recorded a collection of demos for a demo tape to be sent to record labels. One of the demos recorded was that of "Pon de Replay", which was written and produced by Carl Sturken, Evan Rogers and Vada Nobles in 2004. The first to respond to the demo tape was Jay-Z, who had recently been appointed as president and CEO of Def Jam Recordings, where Rihanna auditioned for him and music executive L.A. Reid, in his office. Looking back on the audition and meeting Jay-Z, Rihanna explained during an interview how she felt before walking into the room, saying: "That's when I really got nervous ... I was like: 'Oh God, he's right there, I can't look, I can't look, I can't look!' I remember being extremely quiet. I was very shy. I was cold the entire time. I had butterflies. I'm sitting across from Jay-Z. Like, Jay-Zee. I was star-struck." During the audition, Rihanna performed Whitney Houston's cover of the Isley Brothers' "For the Love of You", "Pon de Replay" and "The Last Time", the latter two of which would go on to be included on her debut album, Music of the Sun. Initially, Jay-Z was skeptical about signing Rihanna, because he felt "Pon de Replay" was too big for her, saying "when a song is that big, it's hard [for a new artist] to come back from. I don't sign songs, I sign artists". "Pon de Replay" was released via iTunes on July 26, 2005, through Def Jam Recordings.

== Composition ==
"Pon de Replay" is a pop, dancehall and R&B song that infuses a reggae style. The song is written in the key of F-sharp minor and is set in common time with a moderated dance groove, with a metronome of 100 beats per minute. Rihanna's vocal range in the song spans from the low note of F♯_{3} to the high note of C♯_{5}. The title of the song is in Bajan Creole, a primarily spoken language used in Barbados, and means "play it again" in English. Lyrically, the song is about asking the DJ to play the protagonist's favorite song, as well as the fulfillment of dancing in a club. Doug Rule of Metro Weekly commented on the lyric "Hey Mr. DJ, won't you turn the music up?" and that it follows in the footsteps of recent songs which also incorporated "Hey Mr. DJ", including Madonna's "Music" and Jennifer Lopez's "Play".

Rihanna — "Pon de Replay"
A 25 second sample of "Pon de Replay" featuring Rihanna singing part of the chorus and part of the pre-chorus, where she tells the DJ to keep playing the song she wants to listen to.

In an interview with Kidzworld, Rihanna explained the lyrical content of the song, saying: "It's just language that we speak in Barbados. It's broken English. Pon is on, de means the, so it's just basically telling the DJ to put my song on the replay." Jason Birchmeier of AllMusic wrote about the song's composition and musical influences, "[Pon de Replay] is driven by booming dancehall-lite beats and a reggae vocal cadence (and title spelling), it's a simple dance-pop song at its core, with standard English-language singing as well as a can't-miss singalong hook." Barry Walters of Rolling Stone also commented on the song's composition and concurred with Birchmeier's opinions of the song, writing that the song is "a poppy piece of dancehall reggae with slapping, syncopated beats recalling big-band jazz".

== Critical reception and legacy ==
The song received generally positive reviews from music critics. Sal Cinquemani of Slant Magazine praised the song, and compared it to Beyoncé and Sean Paul's 2003 chart topper "Baby Boy", because of how both songs feature "a dancehall-pop mixture". Barry Walter of Rolling Stone called the song "sexy and savvy".

In July 2020, Rolling Stone Australia / New Zealand ranked "Pon de Replay" as the 78th greatest debut single of all time. The magazine's editors described the song as a "simple launch to nearly two decades" of Rihanna's party anthems and "a runaway hit for her, but... not even the biggest of the runaway hits in her unmatched catalog".

== Chart performance ==
In the United States, "Pon de Replay" debuted at number 97 on June 11, 2005, and ascended into the top 10 of the US Billboard Hot 100 chart at number nine in the issue dated July 16, 2005, and became the "Greatest Airplay Gainer" that week. In the issue dated July 30, 2005, the song peaked at number two on the Billboard Hot 100, being held off of the top spot by Mariah Carey's "We Belong Together", which spent a total of 14 non-consecutive weeks at number one. "Pon de Replay" spent a total of 12 weeks inside the top 10 of the Hot 100 and 23 weeks on the chart in total. The song also peaked at number one on the US Billboard Dance Club Songs and Digital Songs charts, number two on the US Mainstream Top 40 chart, and 24 on the US Hot R&B/Hip-Hop Songs chart. The song was also certified five times platinum by the Recording Industry Association of America on May 24, 2025, denoting shipments of over 5,000,000 copies.

In New Zealand, the song debuted at number 37 on the New Zealand Singles Chart on August 15, 2005, and peaked at number one in its ninth week on the chart, after having been locked at number two for four weeks previous. The song spent a total of seven weeks inside the top five chart positions and 16 weeks on the chart in total. In Australia, "Pon de Replay" debuted at number 13 on the Australian Singles Chart on September 25, 2005, and peaked at number six in its ninth week on the chart. The song spent a total of 10 weeks in the top 10 chart positions and 22 weeks on the chart in total and was certified platinum by the Australian Recording Industry Association, denoting shipments of over 70,000 copies.

Elsewhere, the song achieved great commercial success in Europe, peaking inside the top 10 of eight charts. In Switzerland, the song debuted at number eight on the Swiss Music Charts on September 11, 2005, and peaked at number three for three consecutive weeks. The song spent a total of 41 weeks on the chart, becoming her longuest-running single until "Unfaithful". The song also debuted at number four on the Norwegian Singles Chart and peaked at number three in its fifth week; the song spent a total of 15 weeks on the chart. "Pon de Replay" also peaked inside the top five in Denmark, Austria and Sweden, peaking at numbers four, five and five, respectively. "Pon de Replay" also peaked inside the top 10 in Italy and Finland, peaking at numbers six and eight, respectively. However, the song was less successful in other territories, peaking at number 15 in The Netherlands and number 18 in France and Spain, respectively. In the United Kingdom, "Pon de Replay" debuted and peaked at number two on the UK Singles Chart on September 3, 2005. The song stayed at the number two position for a further week, and stayed inside the top 10 for four weeks.

== Music video ==
The music video for "Pon de Replay" was directed by Little X. The video was filmed in Toronto, Canada at now-defunct Republik Nightclub and is set in a nightclub and begins with Rihanna and two of her friends arriving at a nightclub where the atmosphere appears lackluster; due to the low volume of the music (referencing the song's lyrics), the people in the club seem bored and not dancing. Subsequently, Rihanna vows to make the DJ turn up the music, thus stepping up onto a platform, wearing a gold midriff top with baggy jeans, beginning to perform to the song, causing the DJ, played by Cipha Sounds, to turn the music up. With this, the people still bored now begin dancing to Rihanna's track, including Canadian rapper Kardinal Offishall, who also makes a cameo appearance. Scenes of people dancing in the club are shown, with intercut shots being juxtaposed of Rihanna leaning against a wall with the word "Bar" in LED lights (which is actually part of a Parking sign outside of the window). She dons a pastel blue short dress, singing to the lyrics of the song. Rihanna can be seen belly-dancing on the stage, with neon green laserlights transmit above her. After Rihanna gets the crowd moving, she runs off of the platform onto a dance floor, where the crowd later join her. The video's last scenes show the people in the club all gathered on the middle of the dance floor, choreographing different dance moves. These include a line of people featuring Rihanna, and male dancers who make a bicycle from their bodies.

== Live performances ==
"Pon De Replay" was the opening song on the set list of Rihanna's 2007–09 Good Girl Gone Bad Tour, her first world tour. The singer's performance in Manchester was released in the United Kingdom through iTunes, and is featured on the Good Girl Gone Bad Live DVD. Rihanna performed "Pon de Replay" complete with flags of Barbados and colorful carnival attire at the 2005 MTV Video Music Awards pre-show in Miami on August 28, 2005. Rihanna has performed the song at the Macy's Thanksgiving Day Parade in November 2005.

== Accolades ==
Accolades
Year	Ceremony	Award	Result	Ref.
2005	Teen Choice Awards	Choice: Summer Song	Nominated	
2006	Barbados Music Awards	Best Dance Single	Won	
2006	Barbados Music Awards	Song of the Year	Won	
2006	MTV Video Music Awards Japan	Best New Artist in a Video	Won	

== Track listings and formats ==
Digital download

1. "Pon de Replay" (radio edit) – 3:34

European CD single

1. "Pon de Replay" (radio edit) – 3:34
2. "Pon de Replay" (remix) (featuring Elephant Man) – 3:37

UK maxi CD single

1. "Pon de Replay" (radio edit) – 3:34
2. "Should I?" (featuring J-Status) – 3:06
3. "Pon de Replay" (Cotto's Replay Dub) – 6:48
4. "Pon de Replay" (U-MYX Remix Software)

Australian and European maxi CD single

1. "Pon de Replay" (radio edit) – 3:34
2. "Pon de Replay" (Cotto's Replay Dub) – 6:48
3. "Pon de Replay" (instrumental) – 4:06
4. "Pon de Replay" (music video) – 3:37

Digital download (Dance Remixes)

1. "Pon de Replay" (Pon De Club Play) – 7:32
2. "Pon de Replay" (Cotto's Replay Dub) – 6:47

== Charts ==
=== Weekly charts ===
Weekly chart performance
Chart (2005–2006)	Peak position
Australia (ARIA)	6
Australian Urban (ARIA)	3
Austria (Ö3 Austria Top 40)	5
Belgium (Ultratop 50 Flanders)	5
Belgium (Ultratop 50 Wallonia)	14
Canada CHR/Pop Top 30 (Radio & Records)	1
Canada Hot AC Top 30 (Radio & Records)	13
CIS Airplay (TopHit)	53
Czech Republic (Rádio – Top 100)	44
Denmark (Tracklisten)	5
European Hot 100 Singles (Billboard)	2
Euro Digital Tracks (Billboard) Clean version	11
Finland (Suomen virallinen lista)	8
France (SNEP)	18
Germany (GfK)	6
Greece (IFPI)	29
Hungary (Rádiós Top 40)	7
Hungary (Single Top 40)	5
Ireland (IRMA)	2
Italy (FIMI)	6
Netherlands (Dutch Top 40)	18
Netherlands (Single Top 100)	15
New Zealand (Recorded Music NZ)	1
Norway (VG-lista)	3
Scottish Singles Sales (Official Charts)	5
Spain (PROMUSICAE)	18
Sweden (Sverigetopplistan)	5
Switzerland (Schweizer Hitparade)	3
UK Singles (OCC)	2
US Billboard Hot 100	2
US Dance Club Play (Billboard)	1
US Hot R&B/Hip-Hop Songs (Billboard)	24
US Mainstream Top 40 (Billboard)	2
US Hot Rap Songs (Billboard)	7
US Rhythmic Airplay (Billboard)	4

Weekly chart performance
Chart (2023)	Peak position
US Digital Song Sales (Billboard)	47

=== Year-end charts ===
Year-end chart performance
Chart (2005)	Position
Australia (ARIA)	39
Australian Urban (ARIA)	17
Austria (Ö3 Austria Top 40)	32
Belgium (Ultratop 50 Flanders)	28
Belgium (Ultratop 50 Wallonia)	72
European Hot 100 Singles (Billboard)	17
Germany (Media Control GfK)	39
Hungary (Rádiós Top 40)	77
Italy (FIMI)	43
Netherlands (Single Top 100)	82
New Zealand (RIANZ)	43
Romania (Romanian Top 100)	86
Sweden (Hitlistan)	42
Switzerland (Schweizer Hitparade)	19
UK Singles (OCC)	33
UK Urban (Music Week)	10
US Billboard Hot 100	18
US Dance Club Play (Billboard)	13
US Dance Radio Airplay (Billboard)	27
US Mainstream Top 40 (Billboard)	14
US Rhythmic Top 40 (Billboard)	25

Chart (2006)	Position
Australian Urban (ARIA)	37

== Certifications ==
Certifications
Region	Certification	Certified units/sales
Australia (ARIA)	6× Platinum	420,000^{‡}
Denmark (IFPI Danmark)	Platinum	90,000^{‡}
Germany (BVMI)	3× Gold	450,000^{‡}
Italy (FIMI) since 2009	Gold	35,000^{‡}
New Zealand (RMNZ)	4× Platinum	120,000^{‡}
Spain (Promusicae)	Gold	30,000^{‡}
Sweden (GLF)	Gold	10,000^{^}
United Kingdom (BPI)	3× Platinum	1,800,000^{‡}
United States (RIAA)	5× Platinum	5,000,000^{‡}
^{^} Shipments figures based on certification alone.^{‡} Sales+streaming figures based on certification alone.

== Release history ==
Release dates and formats
Region	Date	Format(s)	Label(s)	Ref.
United States	May 24, 2005	12-inch vinyl	Def Jam; SRP	
United States	June 7, 2005	Rhythmic contemporary radio	Def Jam; SRP	
United States	June 14, 2005	Contemporary hit radio	Def Jam; SRP	
United States	July 26, 2005	Digital download (Dance Remixes)	Def Jam; SRP	
Germany	August 19, 2005	CD	Universal Music	
Germany	August 22, 2005	Maxi CD	Universal Music	
United Kingdom	August 22, 2005	12-inch vinyl; CD; maxi CD	Mercury	
Australia	September 12, 2005	Maxi CD	Universal Music	

== See also ==
- List of number-one dance singles of 2005 (U.S.)
