= With Love... Hilary Duff =

Fragrance by Hilary Duff

Fragrance by Hilary Duff
- Released: September 14, 2006
- Label: Elizabeth Arden
- Perfumer(s): Rodrigo Flores-Roux; Stephen Nilsen
- Successor: Wrapped with Love

With Love... Hilary Duff is the first fragrance by American singer and actress Hilary Duff. It was launched at Macy's department stores in the United States on September 14, 2006.

== Background and development ==
On September 28, 2005, it was announced that Duff had signed a deal with Elizabeth Arden to create a line of fragrances. Scott Beattie, the chairman and CEO of the company, called her "the natural choice" to "reach fragrance buyers of all ages", citing that she is "recognised globally" for her "tremendous talent and glamorous star appeal". He further stated that Elizabeth Arden was proud to partner with the singer and actress and "will take our inspiration from [her] to build a stunning line of fragrance products." Duff shared similar sentiments, revealing that she was looking forward to working with the company's team in creating a line that is "fresh and innovative" and a scent that "everyone will enjoy wearing, including me". The first fragrance, entitled With Love... Hilary Duff, was officially unveiled on July 21, 2006.

She worked on her the scent with perfumers Rodrigo Flores-Roux and Stephen Nilsen. Duff visited Quest International's laboratories in New York City, where she smelled more than 100 notes before narrowing her choices down to ten. This is when she discovered that all of the scents that she preferred were a "warm Oriental", which the perfumers used as a starting point to create the fragrance. Most of the development process took place while she was on tour, so Flores-Roux and Nilsen would send her samples that she would test with her sister Haylie and members of her crew. According to the singer and actress, "some didn't last long enough", while "others didn't have the right concentrations of notes". After going through 115 different changes, they finally settled on the final scent.

== Launch and marketing ==
With Love... Hilary Duff was launched at Macy's department stores in the United States on September 14, 2006. Duff made a 90-minute appearance at Herald Square in New York City to celebrate the release of the fragrance, which sold an estimated $25,000 USD worth of bottles that evening, according to Women's Wear Daily. The scent became available at 1,600 department and specialty stores across North America starting in mid-to-late September. Three sizes of the eau de parfum were available (1, 1.7 and 3.3 ounces), as well as a 0.13 ounce rollerball eau de parfum and a 5 ounce body lotion. A multi-million dollar marketing campaign followed two months later in order to "stimulate demand for the scent during the important holiday shopping season". It consisted of a website, print ads and three different television spots, each varying in length (15, 30 and 60 seconds, respectively).

The commercials for With Love... Hilary Duff were directed by photographer and director Matthew Rolston and doubles as the music video for her single of the same name, which was used in the spot, but was not officially released until January 2007. According to Rolston, he was asked to incorporate an element of intrigue and open-endedness into the commercial that could serve as a cross-reference to other facets of the promotional campaign. Rolston responded by including allusions to films in which "women use hair and makeup and wardrobe to change their identities", citing Vertigo (1958) and La Femme Nikita (1990) in that respect. He also included a cliffhanger designed to generate discussion among young people—"it gives them something to blog about and be viral about", he said—and adult elements that would help to introduce Duff to an older audience.

== Reception ==
With Love... Hilary Duff was the third best-selling women's fragrance sold at U.S. department stores in the fall of 2006. According to Elizabeth Arden, the sales were "softer than expected", but they expected the scent to receive a boost after the video premiere of "With Love" on February 8, 2007. The fragrance was nominated for Best Celebrity Women's Fragrance in The 8th Annual Basenotes Awards. With Love... Hilary Duff competed against 10 other finalists in the category. The category was won by M by Mariah Carey.

== Flanker ==
Wrapped with Love

Fragrance by Hilary Duff
- Released: January 2008
- Label: Elizabeth Arden
- Predecessor: With Love... Hilary Duff

Following the success of With Love... Hilary Duff, the singer and actress announced on January 15, 2008 that she would be releasing her second fragrance, Wrapped with Love. Duff attended the launch of the scent at the Myer department store in Sydney on February 2, 2008.
