= With Love (Hilary Duff song) =

2007 single by Hilary Duff

Single by Hilary Duff

from the album Dignity
- B-side: "Play with Fire"
- Released: February 20, 2007
- Genre: Dance-pop; electropop
- Length: 3:03
- Label: Hollywood
- Songwriters: Hilary Duff; Kara DioGuardi; Vada Nobles; Julius Diaz
- Producers: Nobles; Logic

Hilary Duff singles chronology
"Play with Fire" (2006)	"With Love" (2007)	"Stranger" (2007)

European single cover

Music video
- "With Love" on YouTube

"With Love" is a song by American singer-songwriter Hilary Duff from her fourth studio album, Dignity (2007). It was written by Duff and Kara DioGuardi with the song's producers Vada Nobles and Julius "Logic" Diaz. According to Duff, the song is about having a "crazy job" but being kept "sane" by a lover. Musically, "With Love" has a dance-rock guitar throughout its hook while it presents more mature vocals by Duff in contrast to her previous works. The song was released as the second single from Dignity on February 20, 2007, by Hollywood Records.

"With Love" received positive reviews from music critics, who called it a reinvention by the singer, and compared it with the works by Kylie Minogue and Gwen Stefani. Commercially "With Love" also fared well. It became her highest-peaking single on the US Billboard Hot 100, where it reached number 24, and additionally reached number one on the region's Hot Dance Club Play chart. It was also able to reach numbers six and eight in Spain and Italy, respectively.

The "With Love" accompanying music video was directed by Matthew Rolston and doubles as the television commercial for Duff's fragrance With Love... Hilary Duff. It was filmed at City Hall in San Francisco, and features Kellan Lutz as Duff's love interest. It depicts Duff being followed by Lutz's character until they share a kiss towards its end. A separate version of the music video was produced for airing on Disney Channel and its online DXD service on the page for Radio Disney. Duff made a live performance of "With Love" at the 2007 MuchMusic Video Awards, where she also won the accolade for People's Choice: Favourite International Artist. A re-recorded version of the song was featured on Duff's third extended play (Mine), which was released to streaming and digital download platforms on May 29, 2026.

== Composition ==
"With Love"
A 17-second sample of the song's chorus features Duff singing over an electropop influenced background.

"With Love" is a moderately fast song that has a 4/4 time signature and a tempo of 122 beats per minute, and it is in the key of C♯ minor. Billboard magazine described it as "a beat-happy track that delivers a propulsive, guitar-laden, bleep-heavy hook", and About.com wrote that the song comprises "[e]lectronic bleeps with hand-clapping and finger-snapping beats", Hilary Duff's "adult pop vocals" and an "attack" of a "[c]runchy, dance-rock guitar [that] underlines the hook". The vocal range required for the song is E_{3} to C♯_{5}. According to Duff, the song is about having a "crazy job" but being kept "sane" by "that one person" with whom they are in a relationship, "and letting that person know that you appreciate criticism or advice because you know it comes from a place of love."

== Remixes ==
Dance music producers Richard Vission and Dave Audé, Joe Bermudez and Francis Preve, Josh Harris (under his alias "Big Woodie") and Bimbo Jones have each remixed "With Love". The New York Post wrote of another remix, by Castillo, "Duff finds her dance groove on this terrific sexy slink ... Its layered production makes it the kind of track that gets better with plenty of volume and some room to shimmy-shake." A hip hop remix of "With Love", the Play-N-Skillz remix, premiered on March 27 and features rapper Slim Thug; it was released to U.S. radio stations on a promotional single. Speaking with Complex Magazine, Thug said that he had wanted to expand his horizons with his participation in the remix:

I was at Play-n-Skillz' crib, listening to beats, smokin'. He said, "I'm doing this remix for Hilary Duff, you wanna jump on it? They got that Disney bread over there." I said, "It's done." I wrote the sh--, they picked it, and that sh-- already on TLC. Sh--, whatever, TRL I mean.

== Critical reception ==
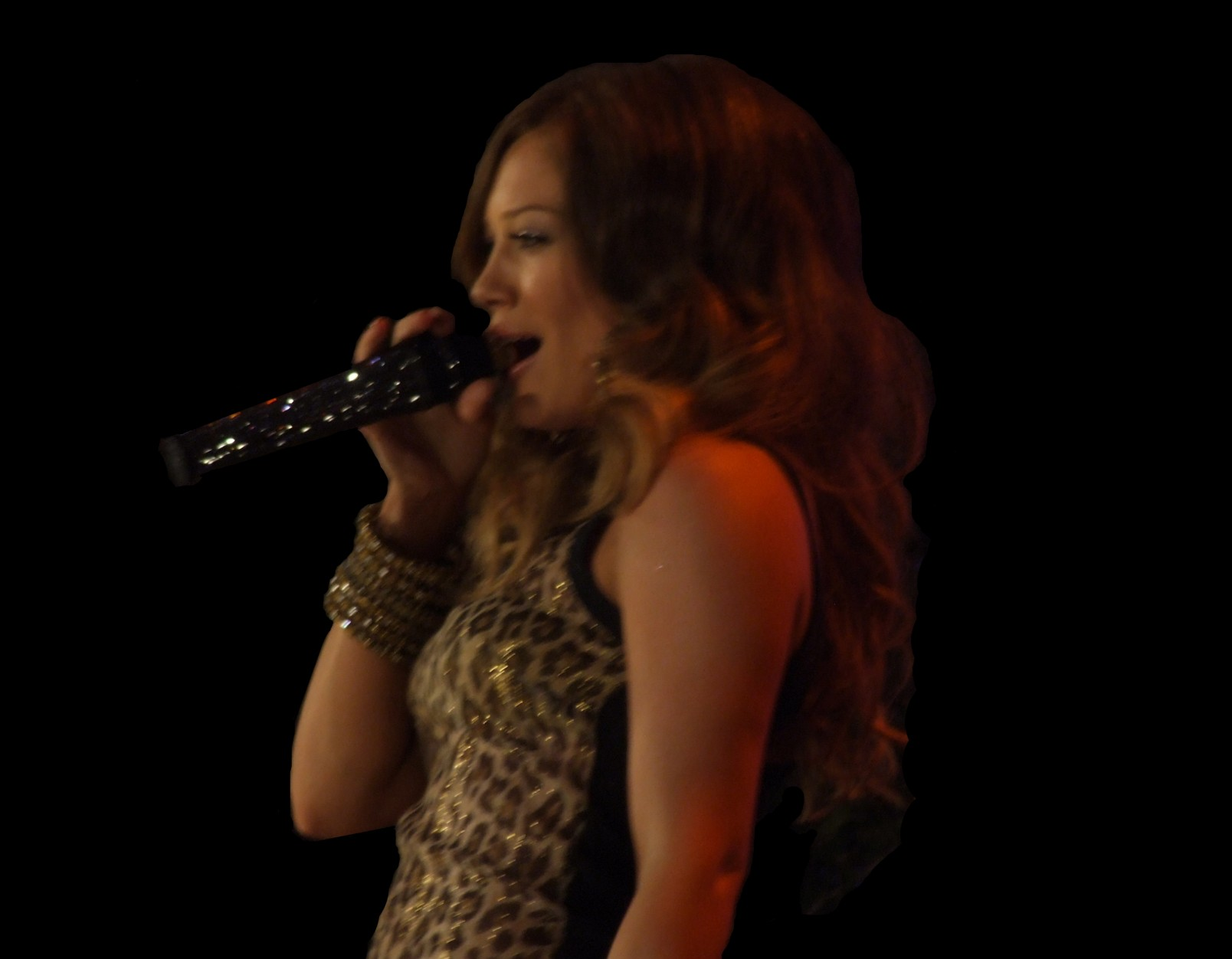
Duff performing the song at 2007 MuchMusic Video Awards.

"With Love" received a positive review from Chuck Taylor of Billboard, who stated that the song "serves to reinvent the appealing singer as a boogie diva. It's a daring approach, and one that sets Hils apart from so many rhythmic acts homogenizing the pop airwaves." It was also well received by Bill Lamb of About.com, who said "on "With Love", [...] style and elegance combine with an irresistible hook to make a record difficult for pop radio to ignore"; Lamb continued that the single "looks poised to break down the [pop radio] walls" for Duff and reach the top ten, and that "Duff sounds like a Kylie Minogue disciple in the making." The song was ranked sixty-seventh on About.com's "Top 100 Pop Songs 2007" list. A review for the UK television program Newsround called it a track that "Kylie or Madonna would love to have on their next album" and predicted that it would be a top twenty hit. Kelefa Sanneh of The New York Times described the song as "a tart dance track", and TeenHollywood.com said it "has a Gwen-Stefani-in-a-rah-rah-skirt feel to it."

== Commercial performance ==
"With Love" premiered on Los Angeles radio station KIIS-FM on January 25, 2007. It became the most added song to U.S. top 40 radio station playlists in mid February, and it was Duff's highest peaking song on the Billboard Mainstream Top 40 radio chart since her previous single "Come Clean" (2004). "With Love" was released as a digital download in the U.S. on March 13. It debuted at number forty-two, the highest debut of the week, on the Billboard Hot 100 chart in late March 2007; it sold 32,500 downloads that week. In mid-April, the song reached number twenty-four and was the greatest digital sales gainer of the week with sales of 57,500. "With Love" remained on the Hot 100 for nine weeks. The song became Duff's first to top the Hot Dance Club Play chart and her first to reach the top ten on the Pop 100 chart. It was ranked twenty-seventh on the year-end Hot Dance Club Play Tracks chart. In the United Kingdom, a week before its CD single release, "With Love" debuted at number sixty on the singles chart. The song reached number twenty-nine the following week, where it peaked. It is Duff's lowest peaking single there. The single performed less well than most of Duff's previous singles in Australia, reaching number twenty–two. As of July 27, 2014, the song had sold 550,000 copies in the United States and has been certified gold by the Recording Industry Association of America for equivalent sales of 500,000 units.

== Music video ==
=== Background ===
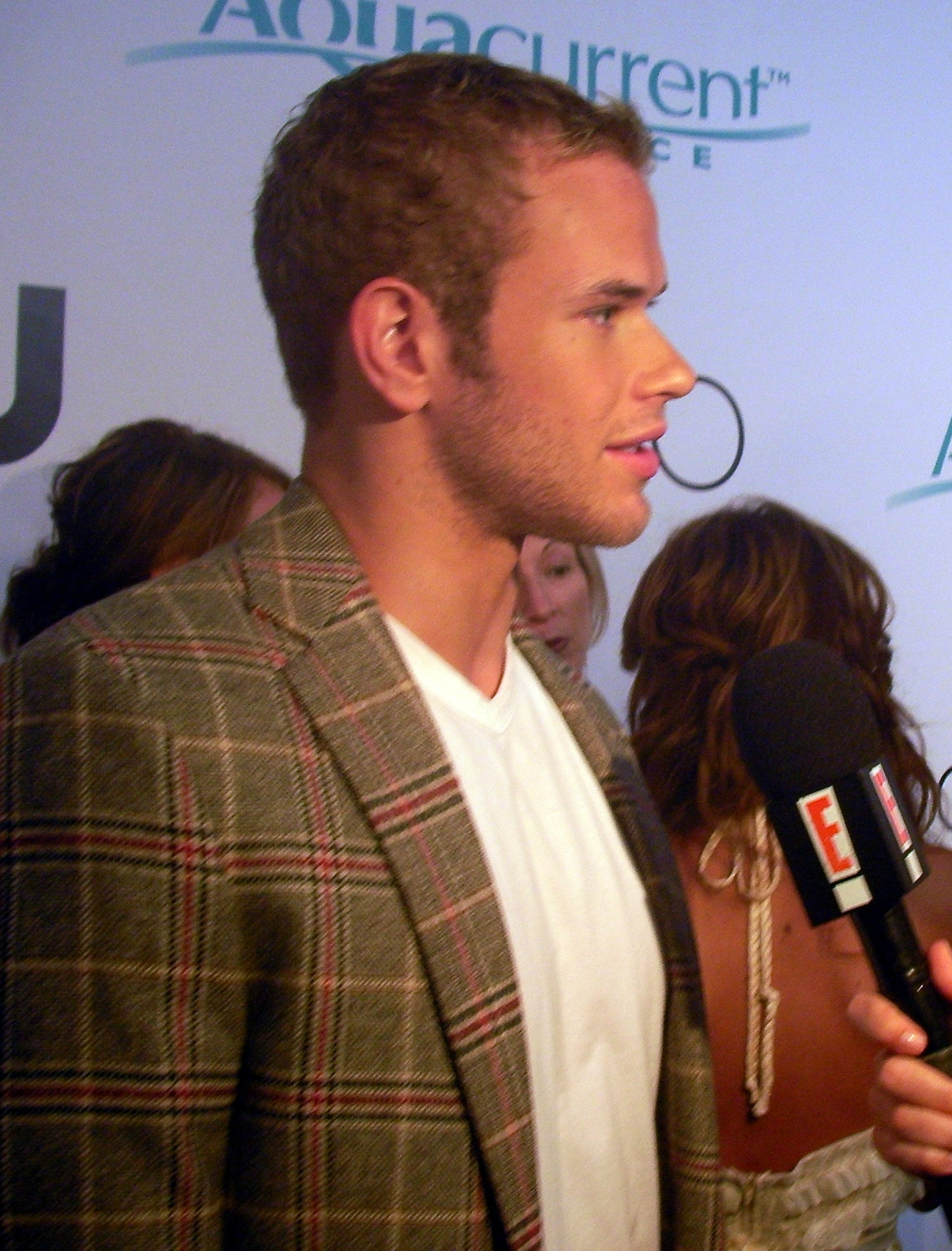
Kellan Lutz is Duff's love interest in the music video for "With Love".

The "With Love" music video was directed by Matthew Rolston and doubles as the television commercial for Duff's fragrance With Love... Hilary Duff. It was filmed at City Hall in San Francisco. Three versions of the commercial, each with a different length (fifteen, thirty and sixty seconds), entered rotation on U.S. television networks in November 2006. Rolston said that he was asked to incorporate an element of intrigue and open-endedness into the commercial that could serve as a cross-reference to other facets of the With Love... Hilary Duff promotional campaign. Rolston responded by including allusions to films in which "women use hair and makeup and wardrobe to change their identities", citing Vertigo (1958) and La Femme Nikita (1990) in that respect. He also included a cliffhanger designed to generate discussion among young people—"It gives them something to blog about and be viral about", he said—and adult elements that would help to introduce Duff to an older audience.

=== Synopsis ===
The video begins with Duff receiving a standing ovation for a performance. She goes backstage, where her entourage hands her a bag, coat and hat. A man (played by Kellan Lutz) who was standing outside the auditorium follows her to a hotel. In the lobby, Duff sprays With Love... Hilary Duff perfume on her neck, reverses her coat and puts on a black wig, giving her hat to an old black man whose back is turned. Pursued by the first man, she walks up a staircase, throws the coat off the railing, tears off her white dress to reveal black, and rips off the lower half of the dress. The man smells the perfume on her coat and follows her into an elevator car, where she teases him by pulling his tie. The cables holding the elevator car break, causing it to fall down the shaft, and Duff and the man embrace, kissing passionately. The video concludes with a title card that reads, "...to be continued."

=== Release and reception ===
The music video premiered on MTV's Total Request Live on February 8, 2007. It debuted on the Total Request Live countdown the next day at number eight and reached number one on eight subsequent countdowns, eventually being "retired" from the show after forty days on the countdown. In Canada, the video reached number one on the MuchMusic Top 30 Countdown, the first video by Duff to do so. For the video, Duff won the award for People's Choice: Favourite International Artist at the 2007 MuchMusic Video Awards. A separate version of the music video was produced for airing on Disney Channel and its online DXD service on the page for Radio Disney. This version of the video features Duff performing the song with her band in a studio and dancing. The alternate video also aired on Family, in Canada.

The New York Times cited the song, music video and commercial's cross-promotion of one another as an example of corporate synergy, and Ron Rolleston, Elizabeth Arden's executive vice president for marketing in New York, called it "an interesting evolution in advertising [...] The commercial stands independently, and the music video stands on its own, and they enrich each other. That's what's cool about it [...] young people are engaged by different varieties and types of media". Rolleston said the campaign, the goal of which was to "[combine] advertising and entertainment", was "an interesting challenge [...] If video killed the radio star, advertising will save the video". Entertainment Weekly called the video "femme fatale-ish" and "like Madonna's "Justify My Love" for the TRL crowd—steamy hotel assignations, wigs, etc." Sharon Dastur, program director at New York City radio station WHTZ, said that her first reaction to the video was, "'This is exactly the kind of song she should be doing.' Hilary's more mature look completed the package. Her sound and image are a natural progression."

== Track listings ==
- Digital download
1. "With Love" — 3:03
- Australian CD maxi single
1. "With Love" — 3:03
2. "With Love" (Richard Vission Big Room Love Mix) — 6:08
3. "Play with Fire" (Richard Vission Remix Radio Edit) — 3:10
- UK CD single
1. "With Love" — 3:07
2. "Play with Fire" — 3:02
- UK CD maxi single / German CD maxi single
1. "With Love" — 3:07
2. "With Love" (Houzecrusherz Radio Edit) — 2:51
3. "Play with Fire" (Vada Mix) — 3:16
- Digital download (Boosta Club Remix)
1. "With Love" (Boosta Club Remix) — 6:35
- Digital download (Richard Vission Big Room Love Mix)
1. "With Love" (Richard Vission Big Room Love Mix) — 6:08

== Charts ==
Chart (2007)	Peak position
Australia (ARIA)	22
Canada Hot 100 (Billboard)	16
Canada CHR/Top 40 (Billboard)	19
Canada Hot AC (Billboard)	33
European Hot 100 Singles (Billboard)	46
Germany (GfK)	91
Ireland (IRMA)	26
Italy (FIMI)	8
Netherlands (Single Top 100)	91
New Zealand (Recorded Music NZ)	27
Scotland Singles (OCC)	14
Spain (Promusicae)	6
UK Singles (OCC)	29
US Billboard Hot 100	24
US Dance Club Songs (Billboard)	1
US Pop Airplay (Billboard)	25

== Certifications ==
Region	Certification	Certified units/sales
United States (RIAA)	Gold	500,000^{‡}
^{‡} Sales+streaming figures based on certification alone.

== Release history ==
Release dates and formats for "With Love"
Region	Date	Format	Version	Label	Ref(s).
United States	February 20, 2007	Original	Contemporary hit radio	Hollywood	
United States	March 13, 2007	Original	Digital download	Hollywood	
Australia	March 17, 2007	CD single	Various	EMI	
United Kingdom	March 19, 2007	CD single	Various	EMI	
Germany	March 23, 2007	CD single	Various	EMI	
Italy	April 16, 2007	Digital download	Boosta club remix	EMI	
United States	May 15, 2007	Digital download	Richard Vission remix	Hollywood	

== See also ==
- List of number-one dance singles of 2007 (U.S.)
