= Play with Fire (Hilary Duff song) =

Single by Hilary Duff

from the album Dignity
- Released: August 21, 2006
- Recorded: 2006
- Genre: Electropop; techno
- Length: 3:02
- Label: Hollywood
- Songwriters: Hilary Duff; Kara DioGuardi; Rhett Lawrence; will.i.am
- Producer: Rhett Lawrence

Hilary Duff singles chronology
"Beat of My Heart" (2005)	"Play with Fire" (2006)	"With Love" (2007)

Music video
- "Play With Fire" (Richard Vision Remix) on YouTube

"Play with Fire" is a song recorded by American singer Hilary Duff for her fourth studio album, Dignity (2007) and is the fourteenth and final track on the album. It was written by Duff, Kara DioGuardi, Rhett Lawrence and will.i.am and produced by Lawrence. The song was sent to mainstream radio in the United States on August 21, 2006, as the lead single from Dignity.

"Play With Fire" was supplemented with promotional remixes by Richard Vission, and the song subsequently became Duff's first to chart on the US Billboard Dance Club Songs chart, where it peaked at number 31.

== Composition ==
"Play with Fire"
A sample of song's chorus, backed by synth beats.

"Play with Fire" is an electropop and a techno song.

"Play with Fire" was formerly called "Happy" but the song's lyrics and instrumentals were changed, and "Happy" became a separate track on Dignity. The song is played during the first club scene in the 2006 film Material Girls, in which Hilary Duff stars.

According to Duff, "Play with Fire" and the other songs on the album are "more dancey" than her previous efforts and make use of more real instruments. "[I]t's fun and funky and different, something new for me. It's really cool", she said. She also described the album's sound as "a little less pop-rock and more electronic-sounding. It has a lot of dance melodies." The "teaser" release of the single in advance of the album was, as she put it, "to give listeners a chance to get into [her] new sound, which matches the whole dance/electronic rock sounding vibe."

== Critical reception ==
Billboard magazine's Chuck Taylor described the song as being "less of the clichéd little-girl-playing-tough-pop/rocker than it is a truly intriguing exploration into darker, more experimental melodic structures that could attract a whole new crowd of late-night dancefloor minions to the Duff camp." Allison Stewart, in a negative review of Dignity for The Washington Post, wrote that the song "boasts what may be the best kiss-off in months ("I don't have time for this, I'm off to play in Houston"), even if most of Duff's tween audience can't exactly claim it for everyday use." Dave de Sylvia of Sputnikmusic also gave a negative review deeming the song as "awful". David Sanford of About.com gave the Richard Vission remix of the song a positive review, commenting the song is "perfect for those DJs who just can't admit to playing a Hilary Duff record." Richard Vission created remixes of the song, and Billboard called the Richard Vission radio edit "a true work of art, refashioning Duff as a potential innovator — and heaven knows there are precious few of those these days ... It will be fascinating to see if this is an enchanting fluke, or if America is destined to at last see the arrival of its own Kylie [Minogue]."

== Music video ==
The "Play with Fire" music video was directed by Alex and Martin and filmed in Toronto, Canada in July 2006. Alex and Martin have described the video as "real and surreal" and compared its visual effects to an amusement park house of mirrors. The directors said that they designed the video so that each frame is vital, writing "[f]or example, we could see a glass reflection close-up of Hilary vibrate and explode which then transitions to a completely different image behind her, then disintegrates into a new performing shot." The video was inspired by the 1948 Orson Welles film noir The Lady from Shanghai, and Duff said that "[i]t's definitely different from what anyone had seen before". According to Duff, the music video for the song was filmed before the song's completion because she wanted it to be the album's first single. On the night following the rehearsals and wardrobe fittings for the video, Duff returned to the studio and finished recording the song three hours later, before a thunderstorm knocked out some of the equipment. Producer Rhett Lawrence submitted the song to the makers of the video the next morning, less than three hours before shooting was due to begin. Duff said that the situation "kind of worked out perfectly".

The music video premiered on August 15, 2006 on MTV's Total Request Live in the United States. It reached number five on the Total Request Live top ten video countdown and remained on the show for nineteen days, until September 14. In Australia, the video premiered during the week of April 23, 2007. For the video, Alex and Martin were nominated for Best Direction of a Female Artist at the MVPA Awards, losing to Floria Sigismondi and Christina Aguilera for the video for Aguilera's "Hurt". Jane magazine described the "trippy visuals" in the video as being "a million miles away from the rainy, suburban comfort and adolescent longing of the clip for [Duff's] 'Come Clean'". The magazine also noted Duff's "sexy silver dress" in the video, writing that "she seems to be announcing a new grown-up woman, one who is diving headfirst into her 20s with a mission to distance herself from her bubblegum past." Duff said, "I haven't really done the super-sexed thing. That's not really me. There's a different way, a cooler way to go about it."

== Track listing ==
- Digital download
1. "Play with Fire" — 3:02
- Digital download (Remix)
1. "Play with Fire" (Richard Vission Remix Radio Edit) — 3:12
- Richard Vission Remix maxi single
1. "Play with Fire" (Richard Vission Remix Radio Edit) — 3:10
2. "Play with Fire" (Richard Vission Mix Show Edit) — 4:53
3. "Play with Fire" (Richard Vission Club Mix) — 6:11
4. "Play with Fire" (Richard Vission Dub Mix) — 5:53
5. "Play with Fire" (Original Version) — 3:02

== Credits and personnel ==
Credits for "Play With Fire" adapted from Dignity liner notes.

- Hilary Duff – vocals, writer
- Kara DioGuardi – writer
- Rhett Lawrence – writer, producer, mixer
- William Adams – writer

== Charts ==
Chart (2006)	Peak position
US Dance Club Songs (Billboard)	31

== Release history ==
Release dates and formats for "Play with Fire"
Region	Date	Format	Version	Label	Ref.
United States	August 21, 2006	Contemporary hit radio	Original	Hollywood	
United States	May 15, 2007	Digital download	Richard Vission remix	Hollywood	
