= Good Days Bad Days =

Single by Kaiser Chiefs

from the album Off with Their Heads
- B-side: "Acting Up"
- Released: 15 December 2008
- Recorded: 2008
- Genre: Indie rock; post-punk revival
- Length: 2:58
- Label: Polydor
- Songwriters: Ricky Wilson; Andrew White; Simon Rix; Nick Baines; Nick Hodgson
- Producers: Mark Ronson; Eliot James

Kaiser Chiefs singles chronology
"Never Miss a Beat" (2008)	"Good Days Bad Days" (2008)	"Little Shocks" (2011)

"Good Days Bad Days" is the second single from Kaiser Chiefs' third studio album, Off with Their Heads. It was released in the United Kingdom on 15 December 2008. The song featured in several home videos from the recording sessions for the album, although at the time of release the name of the song was not enclosed. The single peaked at number 111 on the UK Singles Chart. This song was also used as the theme song for the Australian reality TV show, homeMADE.

== Track listing ==
CD

1. "Good Days Bad Days"
2. "Addicted to Drugs - Appendix 1"

7"

1. "Good Days Bad Days"
2. "Acting Up"

Digital Download

1. "Good Days Bad Days"
2. "Addicted to Drugs - Appendix 1"
3. "Acting Up"
4. "Good Days Bad Days" (Calvin Harris Remix) * iTunes release only

== Music video ==
The music video has been directed by Alex Courtes and produced at Partizan. It was premiered on the Channel 4 network on Channel 4 and 4Music and sees the band playing as a foursome, due to keyboardist Nick Baines being hospitalized due to appendicitis. The keyboards are present, but occupied only by Baines' hat and a sign "Gone to Hospital" (later by a sign "Back in 5 mins").

There was also a Fan Edition video released on YouTube before the album release with the song put to animations of art pieces done by Kaiser Chiefs fans who posted their work on the band's forum pages.
