= Stranger (Hilary Duff song) =

2007 single by Hilary Duff

Single by Hilary Duff

from the album Dignity
- Released: June 25, 2007
- Genre: Pop rock; dance-pop
- Length: 4:10
- Label: Hollywood
- Songwriters: Hilary Duff; Kara DioGuardi; Vada Nobles; Derrick Harvin; Julius Diaz
- Producers: Vada Nobles; Derrick Harvin; Logic

Hilary Duff singles chronology
"With Love" (2007)	"Stranger" (2007)	"Reach Out" (2008)

Music video
- "Stranger" on YouTube

"Stranger" is a song recorded by American singer Hilary Duff for her fourth studio album, Dignity (2007). It was written by Duff and Kara DioGuardi with the song's producers Vada Nobles, Derrick Harvin, and Julius "Logic" Diaz.

== Background and release ==
In mid April 2007, in a post on Hilary Duff's blog, she told her fans that they could vote for what they thought should be the next single from Dignity. According to a later post, fan feedback via votes was "overwhelmingly" in favor of "Stranger" as the next single. Duff promoted the song with a performance on So You Think You Can Dance.

In mid-2007, concurrent to the preparation of the radio release of "Stranger", Duff was featured in a bikini on the July covers of the magazines Us Weekly and Shape, and on the August cover of Maxim accompanied by the declaration that she had gone "from the queen of teen to breakout sex symbol". The Associated Press wrote that the first two were representative of "a clear move [on Duff's part] to put her Lizzie McGuire past behind her", and that more provocative imaging of her would help her singles to garner mainstream radio play: "Ultimately, nature, time and genetics may help Duff in a way Disney, despite all its might, cannot." Guy Zapoleon, a radio consultant and former programmer for top 40 radio, said such imaging would "definitely have a positive effect on the attitude of programmers, who are mostly male, as Disney tries to mature her image".

The single was released to U.S. contemporary hit radio stations on July 10, 2007.

== Composition ==
'Stranger" is a pop rock and dance-pop song with influences of Arabic music and bhangra. The song was rumored to be about Duff and her relationship with her ex-boyfriend, Joel Madden. However, according to Duff, the song is actually about how she thought her mother feels around her father, who had an extramarital affair with another woman. Duff said she wrote "Stranger" to appear to be about one of her own relationships, because she didn't want people to know about the strained relationship between her parents. "But I've realized that so many can relate to what I've gone through", she said. Another song on the album, "Gypsy Woman", was inspired by the same situation. Duff told Access Hollywood that writing the song "was like therapy, you know. Just a total release of all the things you hold inside".

== Critical reception ==
A writer for BBC Radio 1 gave the song three stars, commenting on how it "continues the more grown-up, serious side of Hilary Duff"; he called the vocals "definitely more in the ballpark of 'husky' rather than 'impressive'" and said the Eastern sound owed much to songs such as the Pussycat Dolls' "Buttons". Although he stated he would prefer "Danger", another song on Dignity, to be a single, he said "Stranger" "[wouldn't] sound out of place on a Britney Spears album, which suggests to me that she's done a passable job of leaving behind her bubblegum past", and that it made him "[do] a fair bit of seat-dancing".

A review from Music Focus called the track "unashamedly pop" and said that it was "one of the strongest cuts from Duff's latest album and pushes her into a maturer pop sound". They gave the song a positive review, adding that "Stranger" "need[ed] to be a success" and was "cool, confident slice of dance pop and some of Duff's best work to date". Gary Lancaster of TeenSpot gave the song four stars, calling it an "example of how a modern pop anthem really should sound". He also called it "sleek and sophisticated" and a "catchy, chart worthy track". The song was well received by Billboard reviewer Chuck Taylor, who called it "uptempo" and "dance-friendly", but said that "Top 40 is a tough call".

Blender magazine included the song in the "Dangerously in Love" category on its year-end "Oh Yeah... 209 Songs We Like" list.

== Chart performance ==
In the United States, "Stranger" reached number ninety-seven on the Billboard Hot 100 and became Duff's lowest peaking song on the chart, on which it spent one week. The single received frequent airplay in U.S. nightclubs, peaking at number one on the Billboard Hot Dance Club Play chart—it was Duff's third entry on the chart, and her second consecutive number-one single. On the year-end Hot Dance Club Play Tracks chart, "Stranger" was ranked thirty-ninth. It reached number eighty-six on the Canadian Hot 100, and is included on the MuchMusic compilation album MuchDance 2008. As of July 27, 2014, the song had sold 253,000 copies in the United States.

The WaWa club mix of the song was premiered at the opening party of the Ibiza nightclub Space, which named it "Single of the Week" in its weekly podcast. The UK single release of "Stranger" was to be on July 9, according to FemaleFirst.co.uk, but it was moved back to August 20 to allow the remix to gain airplay in clubs, and then to September 3, when it received a download-only release. "Stranger" debuted at 102 on the UK Singles Chart. In Australia, the song was the third most-added to radio in the week ending October 24; it entered the Australian ARIA Singles Chart on November 12 at number sixty-eight on download sales alone. It subsequently left the chart, and re-entered at number forty-nine.

== Music video ==
The video for the single was directed by Fatima Robinson and was shot in Los Angeles, including at a mansion in Silver Lake, between May 10 and 12, 2007. Duff said she was ill during the shoot, but that it went well because she liked the song and the director; she also said she thought it was her best music video to date. The video premiered on Yahoo! Music on May 30, 2007 and had its "First Look" on Total Request Live on June 6, 2007.

The video begins with Duff's character running out of her home to look for her romantic partner (played by Nick Hounslow), who drives away. It cuts to her waking up and finding a letter and a bracelet, and then shows Duff watching a woman seducing her partner. At a dinner party, Duff's partner kisses her and then flirts with the other woman. The video cuts to a scene at a lounge where dancers entertain the guests, among whom are Duff's partner and two other men. Duff's partner flirts with one of the dancers. Recurring shots of Duff wearing a hooded jacket are edited into the video. The second verse begins with Duff belly dancing in a harem costume and wearing henna tattoos and beads; according to Duff, they took several hours to apply and reflected the "Indian type beat" in the song. During the second chorus, the dinner party scene is shown again. Duff is introduced to the other woman, and she talks to other guests. The chorus plays again with Duff walking into a nightclub and teasing her partner, before dancing with another man. She then breaks into another dance routine with two other dancers. The final two choruses show Duff and her partner fighting, and Duff looking at a cellphone before leaving the house with a suitcase.

Blender magazine wrote, "Her dancing skills are still a tad stilted but she makes up for it with some key 'despondent' and 'perturbed' acting faces", also noting what it described as "shameless close-ups of a certain cell phone".

== Track listings ==
Spanish CD maxi single
No.	Title	Length
1.	"Stranger"	4:10
2.	"Stranger" (Smax & Gold Club Mix)	8:47
3.	"Stranger" (WaWa Club Mix)	7:04
4.	"With Love" (Bimbo Jones Remix)	6:40
Total length:		26:41

Digital download — WaWa Club Mix
No.	Title	Length
1.	"Stranger" (WaWa Club Mix)	7:07

Digital download — WaWa Mix (Radio Edit)
No.	Title	Length
1.	"Stranger" (WaWa Mix) (Radio Edit)	3:12

Digital download — EP
No.	Title	Length
1.	"Stranger" (Radio Edit)	3:08
2.	"Stranger" (WaWa Club Mix)	7:04
3.	"Stranger" (Smax & Gold Club Mix)	8:47
4.	"With Love" (Bimbo Jones Radio Edit)	2:51
Total length:		21:50

== Charts ==
=== Weekly charts ===
Chart (2007–08)	Peak position
Australia (ARIA)	49
Canada Hot 100 (Billboard)	86
Greece (IFPI)	42
Italy (FIMI)	6
Spain (Promusicae)	14
UK Singles (OCC)	196
US Billboard Hot 100	97
US Dance Club Songs (Billboard)	1
US Dance Airplay (Billboard)	1

=== Year-end charts ===
Chart (2007)	Position
US Dance Club Songs (Billboard)	39
US Dance/Mix Show Airplay (Billboard)	10

== Sales ==
Region	Certification	Certified units/sales
United States	—	253,000

== Release history ==
Region	Date	Format	Label
France	June 25, 2007	Digital download (WaWa Club Mix)	Angel
Germany	June 25, 2007	Digital download (WaWa Club Mix)	Angel
Italy	June 25, 2007	Digital download (WaWa Club Mix)	Angel
Spain	June 25, 2007	Digital download (WaWa Club Mix)	Angel
United States	July 10, 2007	Contemporary hit radio	Hollywood
France	September 3, 2007	Digital download (WaWa Mix Radio Edit)	Angel
Germany	September 3, 2007	Digital download (WaWa Mix Radio Edit)	Angel
Italy	September 3, 2007	Digital download (WaWa Mix Radio Edit)	Angel
Spain	September 3, 2007	Digital download (WaWa Mix Radio Edit)	Angel
United Kingdom	September 3, 2007	Digital download (WaWa Mix Radio Edit)	Angel
United Kingdom	September 3, 2007	Digital download (EP)	Angel
