= Richard Vission =

Canadian electronic music producer (born 1969)

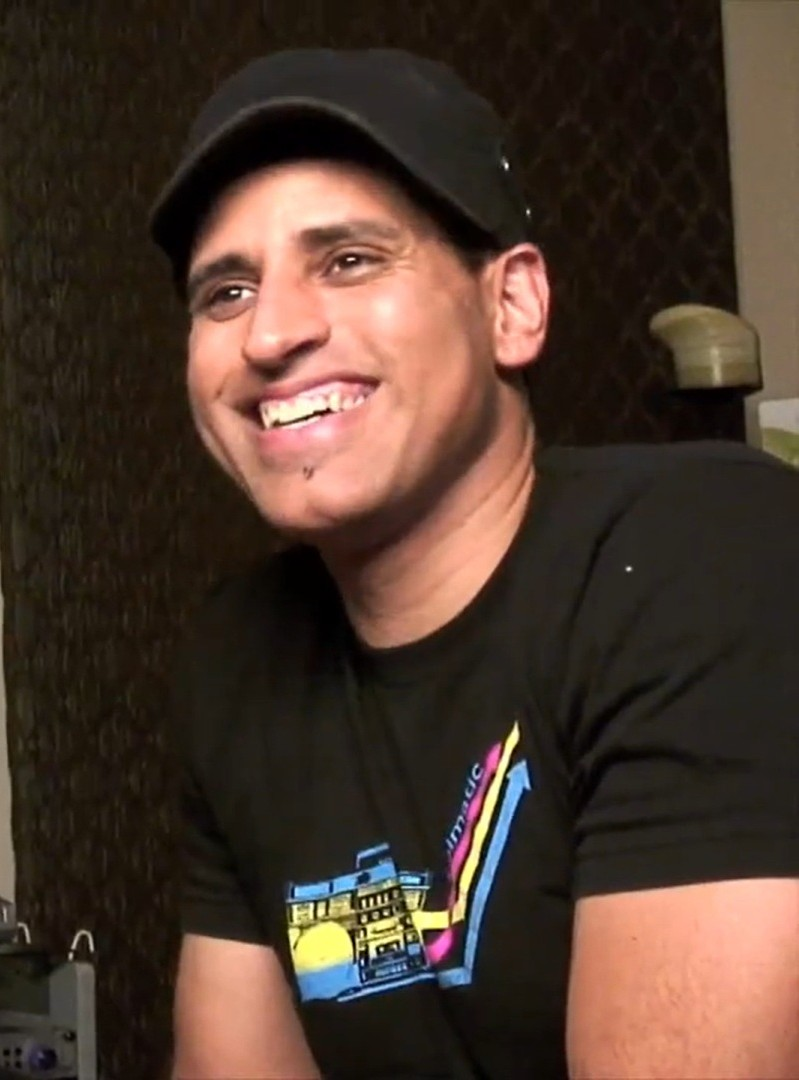
- Vission in 2009

Background information
- Also known as: Humpty
- Born: Richard Gonzalez; 24 May 1969 (age 57); Toronto, Ontario, Canada
- Origin: Los Angeles, California
- Genres: House, techno
- Occupations: Producer, remixer, DJ
- Years active: 1992–present
- Label: Solmatic
- Website: richardvission.com

Richard Gonzalez (born 24 May 1969), better known by his stage name Richard "Humpty" Vission, is a Canadian house music producer, remixer, and DJ.

== Biography ==
He was raised in Highland Park, in Los Angeles, California, and graduated from Benjamin Franklin High School in 1987.

On the airwaves, Richard is host of the longest-running mix shows in the US, Power Tools, which airs every Saturday night at 8 PM PT/11 PM ET on Sirius' XM Channel 13, Pitbull's Globalization. Each show/episode features a special guest DJ.

== Awards ==
- 2006 Ranked 2nd as America's Favorite House DJ according to BPM Magazine

== Discography ==
=== Continuous DJ mixes ===
- 1992 This Is a Test vol. 1
- 1994 This Is a Test vol. 2
- 1995 This Is My House
- 1996 House Nation
- 1997 Drop That Beat
- 1997 The House Connection Vol. 1 (with Bad Boy Bill)
- 1998 House Connection Vol. 2 (with Bad Boy Bill)
- 2000 Shut the F**k Up and Dance
- 2001 Damn That DJ Made My Day
- 2004 Big Floor Funk
- 2005 Automatic
- 2013 House Connection Vol. 3 (with Bad Boy Bill)

=== Charted singles ===
List of charted singles, with selected chart positions
| Title | Year | Chart positions | | | | Certification |
| Title | Year | CAN | AUS | NZ | US Dance | Certification |
|---|---|---|---|---|---|---|
| "I Like That" (with Static Revenger featuring Luciana) | 2009 | 86 | 3 | 19 | 1 | ARIA: 2× Platinum |
| "When It Feels This Good" (vs. Luciana) | 2012 | — | — | — | 4 | |

=== Other singles ===
- 1999 "The Muzik" (feat. Nina Lares)
- 2000 "Shut the Fuck Up and Dance" (as Adrenaline)
- 2001 "Damn That DJ Made My Day" (as Adrenaline)
- 2004 "Never Let Me Down"
- 2004 "Sexy"
- 2004 "Been a Long Time"
- 2004 "Higher"
- 2004 "Freaks (Keep Rockin')"
- 2011 "Boombaa EP"

==== Productions ====
- 2013 Britney Spears - "Don't Cry"
- 2014 Havana Brown - "Whatever We Want"

=== Remixes ===
- 1995 Taylor Dayne - "Say a Prayer" - Vission & Lorimer Mix (with Peter Lorimer)
- 1995 Raw Stylus - "Believe in Me" -Vission & Lorimer mix
- 1995 Miranda - "Round and Round" - AJ & Humpty mix
- 1995 The Shamen - "Destination Escaton" - Vission & Lorimer mix
- 1995 Ace of Base - "Beautiful Life" - Vission and Lorimer mix
- 1995 Crystal Waters - "Relax" - Vission and Lorimer mix
- 1999 Madonna - "American Pie" - RHV Radio Edit/Richard "Humpty" Vission Visits Madonna
- 2000 Madonna - "Music" - RHV Phunkatron Remix/Radio Mix/Dub
- 2001 Madonna - "What It Feels Like for a Girl" - RHV Velvet Masta Remix/Edit
- 2001 Madonna - "Don't Tell Me" RHV Remix/Radio Mix
- 2002 Felix da Housecat featuring Miss Kittin - "Madame Hollywood"
- 2003 Madonna - "Die Another Day" - RHV Electrofried Remix/Radio Mix
- 2003 Andrea Doria - "Bucci Bag" - RHV Pro-Funk Mix
- 2004 Sting - "Stolen Car" - RHV Remix
- 2004 Utada - "Devil Inside" - The RHV Experience Mix
- 2005 The Pussycat Dolls - "Stickwitu" - Richard Vission Remixes
- 2005 The Bravery - "Fearless" - RHV Remix
- 2005 The Killers - "Mr. Brightside" - RHV Remix
- 2005 Usher - "Caught Up" - RHV Remix
- 2006 The Perfects - "Shipwrecked" - RHV Remix (still in production)
- 2006 Under the Influence of Giants - "Mama's Room" - RHV Remix (still in production)
- 2006 David Bowie - "Let's Dance" - Richard Vission Mix
- 2006 Hilary Duff - "Play With Fire" - Richard Vission Remixes
- 2006 Nelly Furtado - "Maneater" - Richard Vission Remix
- 2006 Nelly Furtado - "Promiscuous" -Promiscuous Vission Remix
- 2006 Justin Timberlake - "Sexyback" - Vission's Back Remix
- 2006 Gnarls Barkley - "Crazy" - Crazy Vission Remix
- 2006 Stranger Days - "Somebody" - RHV Remix
- 2006 KoЯn - "Coming Undone" - RHV Remix
- 2007 Timbaland - "The Way I Are" - Richard Vission Remixes
- 2007 Hilary Duff - "Stranger" - Richard Vission Remixes
- 2007 Hilary Duff - "Dignity" - Richard Vission Remixes
- 2007 Hilary Duff - "With Love" - Richard Vission Remixes
- 2008 Lady Gaga - "Just Dance" - Richard Vission Remixes
- 2008 Hilary Duff - "Reach Out" - Richard Vission Remixes
- 2008 OneRepublic - "Apologize" - Richard Vission Remixes
- 2009 The Black Eyed Peas - "Meet Me Halfway" - Richard Vission Solmatic Remix
- 2009 Eva Simons - "Silly Boy" - Silly Boy (Remixes)
- 2009 Pussycat Dolls - "Bottle Pop" - Richard Vission Remixes
- 2009 Hilary Duff - "Any Other Day" - Richard Vission Remixes
- 2010 Enrique Iglesias - "Tonight (I'm F**kin You)" - Richard Vission Solmatic Remix
- 2010 Lady Gaga - "Bad Romance"
- 2012 Madonna - "Turn Up The Radio" - Richard Vission Speakers Blow Remix
- 2012 Havana Brown - "One Way Trip"
- 2012 Cheryl - "Call My Name" - Richard Vission Remixes
- 2012 will.i.am - "This Is Love" - Richard Vission Solmatic Remix
- 2013 Britney Spears - "Work Bitch" - Richard Vission Remixes

== See also ==
- List of number-one dance hits (United States)
- List of artists who reached number one on the US Dance chart
