= True =

True most commonly refers to truth, the state of being in congruence with fact or reality.

True may also refer to:

== Places ==
- True, West Virginia, an unincorporated community in the United States
- True, Wisconsin, a town in the United States
- True, a townland in County Tyrone, Northern Ireland

== People ==
- True (singer) (stylized as TRUE), the stage name of Japanese singer Miho Karasawa
- True (surname)
- True O'Brien (born 1994), an American model and actress

== Arts, entertainment, and media ==
=== Music ===
==== Albums ====
- True (Avicii album), 2013
- True (Jon Anderson album), 2024
- True (L'Arc-en-Ciel album), 1996
- True (Mika Nakashima album), 2002
- True (Roy Montgomery and Chris Heaphy album), 1999
- True (Spandau Ballet album) or the title song (see below), 1983
- True (TrinityRoots album) or the title song, 2001
- True (TRU album), 1995
- True (EP), by Solange Knowles, 2012

==== Songs ====
- "True" (Brandy song), 2008
- "True" (Concrete Blonde song), 1987
- "True" (Jaimeson song), 2003
- "True" (Ryan Cabrera song), 2004
- "True" (Spandau Ballet song), 1983
- "True" (George Strait song), 1998
- "True...", by Riyu Kosaka, 2001
- "True", by Ami Suzuki from Supreme Show, 2008
- "True", by Best Coast from Always Tomorrow, 2020
- "True", by Cindy Walker, covered by Jim Reeves from The International Jim Reeves 1963
- "True", by Hannah Diamond from Reflections, 2019
- "True", by Lasgo from Far Away, 2005
- "True", by Marina from Love + Fear, 2019
- "True", by Paul Weller from Fat Pop (Volume 1), 2021
- "True", by Zion I from True & Livin', 2005
- "You Don't Love Me (True)", written by Louis Cottrell Jr. with Don Albert and Lloyd Glenn

=== Periodicals ===
- True (magazine), an American men's magazine
- Trace (magazine), formerly True, a British hip-hop magazine

=== Other uses in arts, entertainment, and media ===
- True (film), a short film directed by Tom Tykwer, starring Natalie Portman
- True, a 2013 Elixir novel by Hilary Duff with Elise Allen, a sequel to Devoted
- GE True, an anthology TV series based on stories from True magazine
- True, the main protagonist from the Netflix animated series True and the Rainbow Kingdom
- True Network, a Philippine multimedia platform brand of Nation Broadcasting Corporation and TV5 Network Inc.
  - True TV, its pay TV channel available on Cignal channel 19
  - True FM (formerly Radyo5 and Radyo5 True FM), its radio network
    - 105.9 True FM, its flagship station

== Computing ==
- true (Unix), a Unix utility
- true, a boolean value
- TRUE (Temporal Reasoning Universal Elaboration), a discrete and continuous time simulation software program for 2D, 3D and 4D modeling

== Brands and enterprises ==
- True (cigarette), a brand of cigarettes made by Lorillard Tobacco Company
- True (dating service), an online dating service
- True Corporation, a Thai telecommunications group and its flagship mobile operator
  - TrueVisions, a Thai pay television and streaming service provider

== Other uses ==
- True self
- True value, a concept in statistics
- Trust for Urban Ecology, a British ecological organisation

== See also ==
- TRU (band), an American hip hop group
- True north (disambiguation)
- Truth value, in logic and mathematics, a logical value
- False (disambiguation), the opposite of true
- Wheel truing stand
