= True (surname) =

True is a surname. Notable people with the surname include:

- AJ True, Australian composer and musical director, known for the film score of Jirga (2018)
- Alexander True (born 1997), Danish professional ice hockey centre
- Alfred Charles True (1853-1929), American educator and agriculturist
- Allen Tupper True (1881-1955), American artist
- Arnold E. True (1901-1979), American naval officer
- Arthur L. True (1874-1952), American politician
- Ben True (born 1985), American track and field and cross-country athlete
- Bobby True (born 1977), Liberian middle-distance runner
- Charles Kittredge True (1809-1878), American clergyman
- Clarence True (1860-1928), American architect
- David True (born 1942), American painter
- Delbert Leroy True (1923-2001), merican archaeologist
- Diemer True (born 1946), American politician
- Everett True (born 1961), British music journalist
- Frederick W. True (1858-1914), American biologist
- Jacqui True, political scientist and expert in gender studies
- James True (1880–1946), critic of the administration of Franklin Delano Roosevelt
- John M. True (1838–1921), Wisconsin politician
- Katie True (born 1941), American politician
- Laurel True (born 1968), American artist
- Margaret Tupper True (1858–1926), American educator
- Marion True (born 1948), American curator
- Micah True (1953–2012), American ultrarunner
- Nicholas True, Baron True (born 1951), British politician and current Leader of the House of Lords
- Philip True (1948–1998), American foreign correspondent
- Rachel True (born 1966), American actress
- Reiko True (born 1933), Japanese American psychologist
- Ronald True (1891-1951), English murderer
- Sarah True (born 1981), American athlete who competes in triathlon
