= Femme for DKNY =

Fashion line designed by Hilary Duff

Femme for DKNY Jeans is a fashion line designed by Hilary Duff for Donna Karan New York that ran for a limited time. It was announced in the November 2008 issue of Fashion Rules magazine that Duff's previous hit fashion line Stuff by Hilary Duff would be discontinued since she didn't have full control of it anymore. She also stated in the article that she would like to design clothes for girls her age.

Femme was officially announced in Women's Wear Daily on February 5, 2009. Duff said she wanted to design clothes that were multi-functional, like tunics with removable scarves, skinny jeans with adjustable belt loops and tees with detachable and printed necklaces. Femme for DKNY jeans hit shelves nationwide in August 2009 with prices ranging from $39 to $129.

== Promotion ==
Femme for DKNY was announced in the February 5, 2009 issue of Women's Wear Daily, which also included sketches and photos of Duff wearing the clothes herself. Duff also appeared in the September 2009 issue of InStyle, in an exclusive photoshoot of her wearing the clothes taken by photographer Thomas Whiteside. Duff also modeled, along with Sophie Srej and Gracie Carvalho, in the Femme for DKNY Jeans Fall 2009 ad campaign. Shot on the streets of Manhattan by photographer Scott Schuman, the ads are designed to reflect the individual style of trendsetting New Yorkers. These ads have appeared on the DKNY website and in many fashion-related magazines including Teen Vogue, Cosmopolitan, Company and Kiss.

Duff also had a multi-guest arc in Season 3 of Gossip Girl, which aired around the time the clothes hit stores. Duff also had an internet miniseries on YouTube called "The Chase" which premiered August 21, 2009, airing new episodes every Friday thereafter.

Femme was featured along with Duff and a model in the Seventeen September issue and also in the Us Weekly September issue, including Duff versions of the catwalk trends in her collection.

Femme was first released to be ordered on the official DKNY website on September 4 and featured all 30 individual pieces.

== The Chase ==
The Chase is a mini-series which Duff stars in on her official YouTube podcast channel. It premiered on Friday August 21, 2009, with new episodes every Friday. The first episode, "Chapter One: The Beginning," brought in over 22,000 views in its first week and became one the channel's most viewed videos.

On August 28, two more videos were added, "Chapter Two: Suspect Ryan" and "Chapter Three: Suspect Ruby." Both are around 20 seconds long and are based in European cities: "Ryan" is based in Amsterdam and "Ruby" is based in Paris. Both videos have an arrangement of clips featuring Duff in different disguises. They feature the clothes from her Femme line.

Chapters 4 and 5 were both released on September 4. "Chapter 4: Suspect Layla" is set in Shanghai and features a sequined hoodie and black leggings. "Chapter 5: Suspect Kim" is set in New York and features a bomber jacket and grey jeans. "Chapter 6: Closing In" is set in police headquarters and shows two policemen at a billboard with all the photos of Duff in all of the clothes on that she was wearing in the previous chapters.

T"The Final Chapter" was released on September 18, and was under 3 minutes in length. This video starts with Duff in her natural blond hair and a green polo neck. The two male detectives enter and Duff leaves the cinema. They follow her out and she turns a corner and bumps into them again in a different disguise of black hair, then they follow her into a club. In the club Duff changes disguise numerous times as people walk past, from short blond hair to long brown hair and a sequined green dress, and finally blond hair with the tunic. Duff then finally walks down a street where she passes many posters of her with "wanted" printed on them. The video ends with a link to the website.
