= True north (disambiguation) =

True north refers to the direction of the North Pole relative to the navigator's position.

True north or True North may also refer to:

== Places ==
- True North, a mine in the Fairbanks mining district
- "True North", a poetic name for Canada, first used by Alfred Lord Tennyson and popularized by the national anthem "O Canada"

== Arts, entertainment, and media ==
=== Literature ===
- True North (2007 book), a business book by Bill George and Peter Sims
- True North (novel), by Kathryn Lasky, a young adult novel set in the 1850s against a background of slavery
- True North, a 2004 novel by Jim Harrison, set in Michigan's Upper Peninsula, a family is torn apart by a reckless father
- True North, a memoir by Jill Ker Conway
- True North, a non-fiction book about Canada's territories by William R. Morrison
- True North, a comics anthology edited by Derek McCulloch

=== Music ===
- True North (A-ha album and film), 2022
- True North (Bad Religion album), 2013
- True North (Borknagar album), 2019
- True North (Crystal Lake album), 2016
- True North, a 2000 album by Fisher
- True North, a 2008 album by Gustav Bertha
- True North (Michael Chapman album), 2019
- The True North (album), an album by Peter Garrett
- True North Records, Canada's oldest independent record company
- True North: Symphonic Ballet, 2017 ballet to celebrate Canada's 150th anniversary
- True North (Twila Paris album), 1999
- "True North", a 2019 song by Rend Collective from their album Sparkle. Pop. Rampage.
- "True North", a 2020 song by Knuckle Puck from their album 20/20
- "Truenorth", a 2008 song by No-Man from their album Schoolyard Ghosts
- "Truenorth", a 2014 song by In Hearts Wake from their album Earthwalker

=== Production companies ===
- Truenorth (production company), an Icelandic film and television production company
- True North Productions, a British television production company based in Leeds

=== Television ===
- "True North" (Law & Order), an episode of Law & Order
- "True North" (Once Upon a Time), an episode of Once Upon a Time
- The True North (TV series), a 1967 Canadian documentary television series
- Les Pays d'en haut, a 2016-21 Canadian drama television series released as True North in some markets

=== Other uses in arts, entertainment, and media ===
- True North (2006 film), a Scottish film
- True North, a radio show on CKLU-FM Sudbury
- True North (2020 film), a Japanese-Indonesian animated film based on accounts of North Korean prison camps
- True North (website), right-wing news site operated by True North Centre for Public Policy

== Brands and enterprises ==
- True North Centre for Public Policy, a conservative Canadian media outlet
- True North Specialty Products, a Canadian company that sells forestry management and vegetation control chemicals
- True North Sports & Entertainment, a Canadian company that owns the Winnipeg Jets of the National Hockey League
- TrueNorth, a neuromorphic computer chip
- True North, a brand of nuts made by B&G Foods

== Thoroughbreds ==
- True North I (foaled 1940), American Thoroughbred racehorse
- True North III (foaled 1966), American Thoroughbred racehorse
- True North Stakes, a Thoroughbred horse race

== Other uses ==
- True North Centre, the original name of Canada Life Centre in Winnipeg, Manitoba, home of the Winnipeg Jets and AHL's Manitoba Moose
- True North Square, an entertainment and real estate development in downtown Winnipeg, in between Canada Life Centre and RBC Convention Centre
- True North, a Canadian yacht in the 1987 America's Cup
