= Hyperacrius =

Hyperacrius Temporal range: Early Pleistocene to Recent

Scientific classification
- Domain: Eukaryota
- Kingdom: Animalia
- Phylum: Chordata
- Class: Mammalia
- Order: Rodentia
- Family: Cricetidae
- Subfamily: Arvicolinae
- Tribe: Microtini
- Genus: Hyperacrius; Miller, 1896

Type species
- Arvicola fertilis True, 1894

Species
- Hyperacrius fertilis Hyperacrius wynnei

Genus of rodents

Hyperacrius is a genus of rodent in the family Cricetidae. It contains the following species:

- True's vole (Hyperacrius fertilis)
- Murree vole (Hyperacrius wynnei)
