= Peter Sims =

Peter Sims may refer to:

- Pete La Roca, born Peter Sims, American jazz drummer and attorney
- Peter Sims (writer), American writer, entrepreneur, and investor
