= Senator True =

Senator True may refer to:

- Arthur L. True (1874–1952), Washington State Senate
- Diemer True (born 1946), Wyoming State Senate
- John M. True (1838–1921), Wisconsin State Senate
