= Murree vole =

Conservation status
- Least Concern (IUCN 3.1)

Scientific classification
- Kingdom: Animalia
- Phylum: Chordata
- Class: Mammalia
- Order: Rodentia
- Family: Cricetidae
- Subfamily: Arvicolinae
- Genus: Hyperacrius
- Species: H. wynnei

Binomial name
- Hyperacrius wynnei (Blanford, 1881)

Species of rodent

The Murree vole (Hyperacrius wynnei) is a species of rodent in the family Cricetidae. It is endemic to the Himalayas in Pakistan and India. It was named by William Thomas Blanford after its collector, geologist Arthur Beavor Wynne.

== Distribution ==
It is confined to the Himalayas of northern India and Pakistan (including Murree Hills, Kaghan Valley and Swat Valley).
