= Elixir (Duff and Allen novel) =

2010 novel by Hilary Duff and Elise Allen

- Author: Hilary Duff; Elise Allen
- Language: English
- Genre: Young adult fiction
- Publisher: Simon & Schuster
- Publication date: October 12, 2010
- Publication place: United States
- Media type: Print (Hardcover), Digital (E-Book)
- Pages: 330
- ISBN: 1-4424-0853-7
- Preceded by: —
- Followed by: Devoted (2011)

Elixir is the debut young adult novel co-written by American entertainer Hilary Duff with Elise Allen. It was available at booksellers on October 12, 2010. It is the first in a series of books that Duff became committed to write. Elise Allen collaborated on the first book with Duff, and became committed to work jointly with her on the others. The book is now a New York Times Best Seller.

== Plot ==
Clea Raymond is a talented photojournalist and the daughter of a United States Senator and a famous neurosurgeon. Several months before the story begins, her father disappeared while on a humanitarian mission and is presumed dead.

Clea looks over some old photos of herself and notices that a mysterious man wearing black appears in the background of all of them, including several where he is floating in the air. She brings up the phenomenon to her friend Ben, who informs her that her father had noticed the man years earlier and investigated for a while before deciding that he was a harmless guardian spirit. Ben also tells her that her father was looking for the Elixir of Life when he went missing.

While on trip to Brazil, Clea runs into the man from her photos and chases him down. When she catches him, he explains that his name is Sage and that he is a 500-year-old immortal. He and his girlfriend were members of a secret society in Renaissance Italy that studied the Elixir of Life until one day, a group broke into their hideout to steal the elixir. All in attendance were killed, except Sage, who was wounded and taken hostage. His kidnappers force him to drink the elixir to see if it works, then they drink it themselves. Sage escapes and wanders the world for 500 years. The whole time he has been pursued by two organizations. One called The Saviors, who seek to find Sage and use him to create more elixir, and one called Cursed Vengeance, descendants of his kidnappers who have been cursed to live horrible lives until Sage is killed.

Then he reveals that his girlfriend has reincarnated every 100 years and she has always found him but before they had the chance to be together, she would die horribly. This time she has reincarnated as Clea.

The reason for Sage showing up in all of Clea's photos is never given.

Sage says that he ran into Clea's father on his quest for the elixir and sent him to Japan so they decide to go after him. The night before their flight leaves, Sage and Clea declare their love for each other and have sex.

In Japan, they track down an immortal mystic named Magda and ask her about Clea's father's whereabouts. Magda told him about Clea's curse and he vowed to end it before heading off somewhere unknown. Magda then tells Sage that the only way she knows of to end the curse and save Clea is for him to commit suicide using a magical knife that negates his immortality. With that, she destroys the necklace that was the source of her longevity (she never drank the elixir) and withers away into dust.

Sage decides to end his life on a beach but Clea, unknown to him, calls The Saviors and informs them of their location. Before he can kill himself, Sage is taken away by The Saviors and the book ends with Clea vowing to rescue him.

== Creation process ==
Duff said, in an interview she gave to Seventeen Magazine about the creation of Elixir, "I have been playing with the idea for a few years now. It's a lot of fun and at the same time, very challenging." Duff informed the magazine that she had had the idea in her mind for a long time, first with a series of short scripts, but then, following encouragement from her mother, she decided to convert the concept into a book, recruiting Elise Allen to assist her with the writing.

About the paranormal aspect of Elixir, Duff remarked: "I have always been interested in the paranormal and afterlife, everything from ghosts to angels. I think that everyone has that curiosity of the great unknown."

== Reviews ==
Star Magazine gave Elixir 3 out of 4 stars, being positively surprised with Duff's writing. The New York Post wrote, "It has everything: romance and the supernatural; a globe-trotting Hillary Clinton-esque mom; characters with names like Sage and Clea...and a shout-out to Page Six!" MTV's Book Report gave Elixir a very positive review, saying it was ready for "another dose" of Elixir. MTV also said that "Elixir is crying out for a movie adaptation" and suggested that maybe Hilary Duff herself should take the main role. Elixir also reached the New York Times' Best Sellers List at #10 in Children's Chapter Books for one week.

== Sequels ==
Duff had already stated multiple times that she would write a couple of sequels to Elixir, all in collaboration with Allen. In an interview with CosmoGirl! Magazine, she said: "Clea has been on an emotional rollercoaster, so that is probably where the next book will start. Clea will need to find a way to pick herself up and put the pieces of her life back together. Who knows how long that could take? And what her next move will be? Hopefully her dreams will guide her. IF she can dream." But she had said that she had not set anything in stone as yet and that she and her co-writer, Allen, were simply playing around with different ideas. Duff teased on Twitter about a sequel: "Can’t believe so many people have read the book already! Yipeeee! Starting the next one in two weeks". The trade paperback version hit shelves June 7, 2011 as only the hardcover and ebook was released on October 12, 2010.

A sequel, titled Devoted, hit book shelves on October 11, 2011.

Duff announced in July 2012 that the third and final novel in the Elixir series would be titled True. The book was released on April 16, 2013 by Simon & Schuster."
