= TrinityRoots =

New Zealand Band

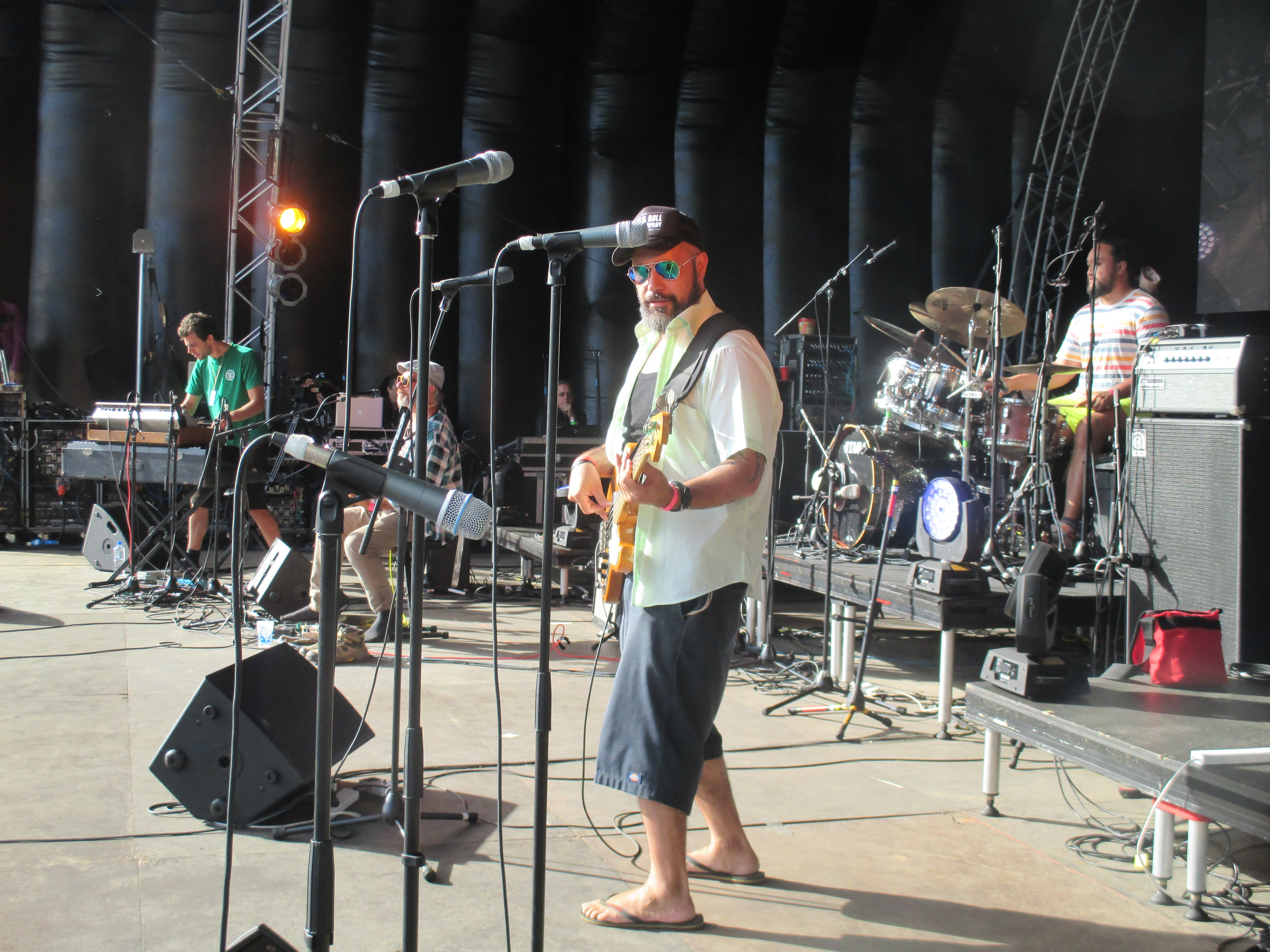
- TrinityRoots performing at Soundsplash 2016

Background information
- Origin: Wellington, New Zealand
- Genres: Rock, soul, reggae
- Years active: 1998–2005, 2010–present
- Members: Warren Maxwell; Rio Hemopo; Ben Wood
- Past members: Riki Gooch; Darren Mathiassen; Ned Ngatae; Maaka McGregor; Jean Pompey

TrinityRoots are a band based in Wellington, New Zealand. Although they are commonly associated with New Zealand reggae they also embody a stripped back, jazz and soul-influenced rhythmic sound, which often builds up to highly emotional drum- and guitar-led crescendos.

Like their contemporaries Fat Freddy's Drop, TrinityRoots formed a loyal fan base through live performances and word of mouth. They played alongside international acts including Ben Harper, Lee Scratch Perry, The Mad Professor, as well as local bands such as Fat Freddys Drop, Salmonella Dub and Che Fu. TrinityRoots has also toured small towns on sellout tours. The band's song "Little Things" was featured prominently in an episode of the cartoon bro'Town.

Before breaking up in 2005, the band released a self-titled EP and two albums, True and Home, Land and Sea. Both albums reached Platinum status in New Zealand with virtually no advertising or media attention.

The band separated in 2005, playing their final concert in February 2005 in a sellout concert to raise relief funds for the Boxing Day Tsunami at the Wellington Town Hall. This material was released in 2010 with accompanying documentary footage as Music Is Choice.

All members of the band, past and present, are involved in other musical projects and continued making music after the 2005 break-up. Lead singer and guitarist Warren Maxwell was a member of Fat Freddy's Drop until late 2006 when he left to spend more time with family, and is the frontman of the acclaimed group Little Bushman. Bassist Rio Hemopo has released solo music and is involved with Breaks Co-op as a member of their live band. Drummer Riki Gooch has also released solo music under his own name and as Eru Dangerspiel, as well as playing and producing for many other artists and projects such as Neil Finn, Hollie Smith and Ria Hall.

In early September 2010, Trinity Roots announced they had re-formed and embarked on a tour of New Zealand.

In July 2011, the band announced that Riki Gooch was leaving. Wellington-based drummer Jean Pompey has replaced him. Gooch had previously left the band after the recording of their first EP, and was replaced by Darren Mathiassen. Gooch returned to the band during the time that True was being recorded, hence both Mathiassen and Gooch featuring in the album sleeve notes. The song "D by D" was written by Mathiassen.

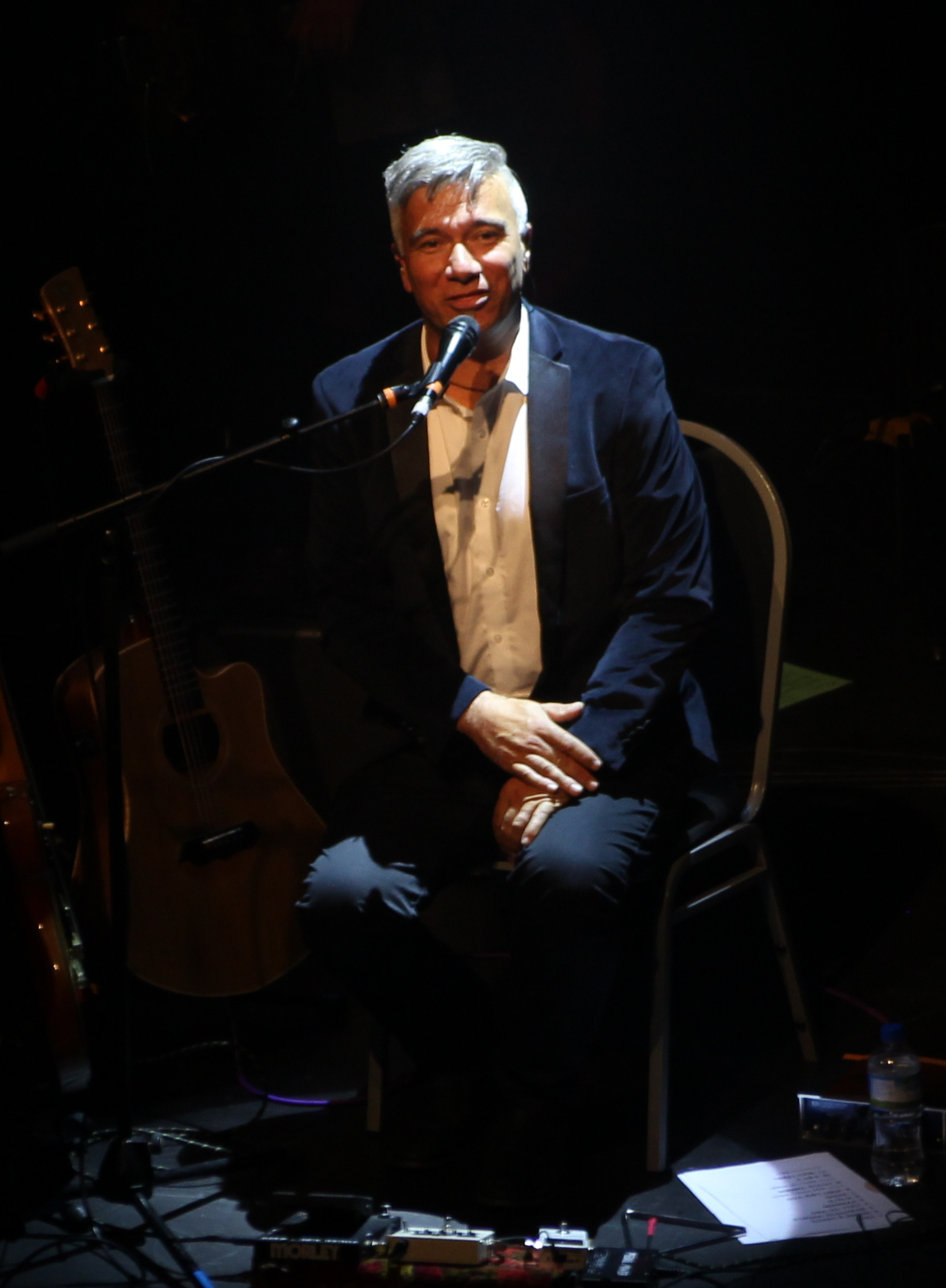
Warren Maxwell

== Current band members ==
- Warren Maxwell (lead vocals/guitar)
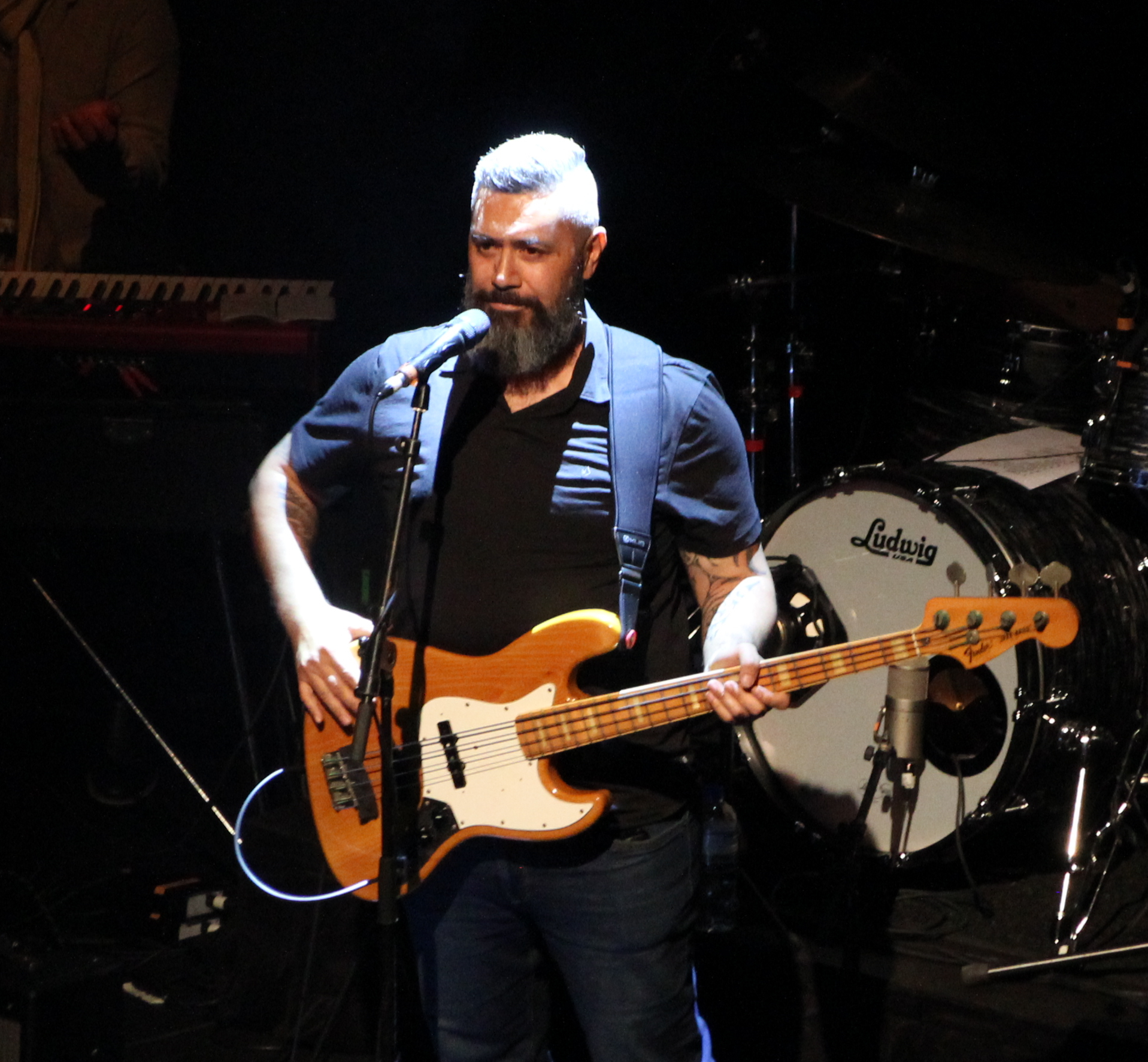
- Rio Hemopo
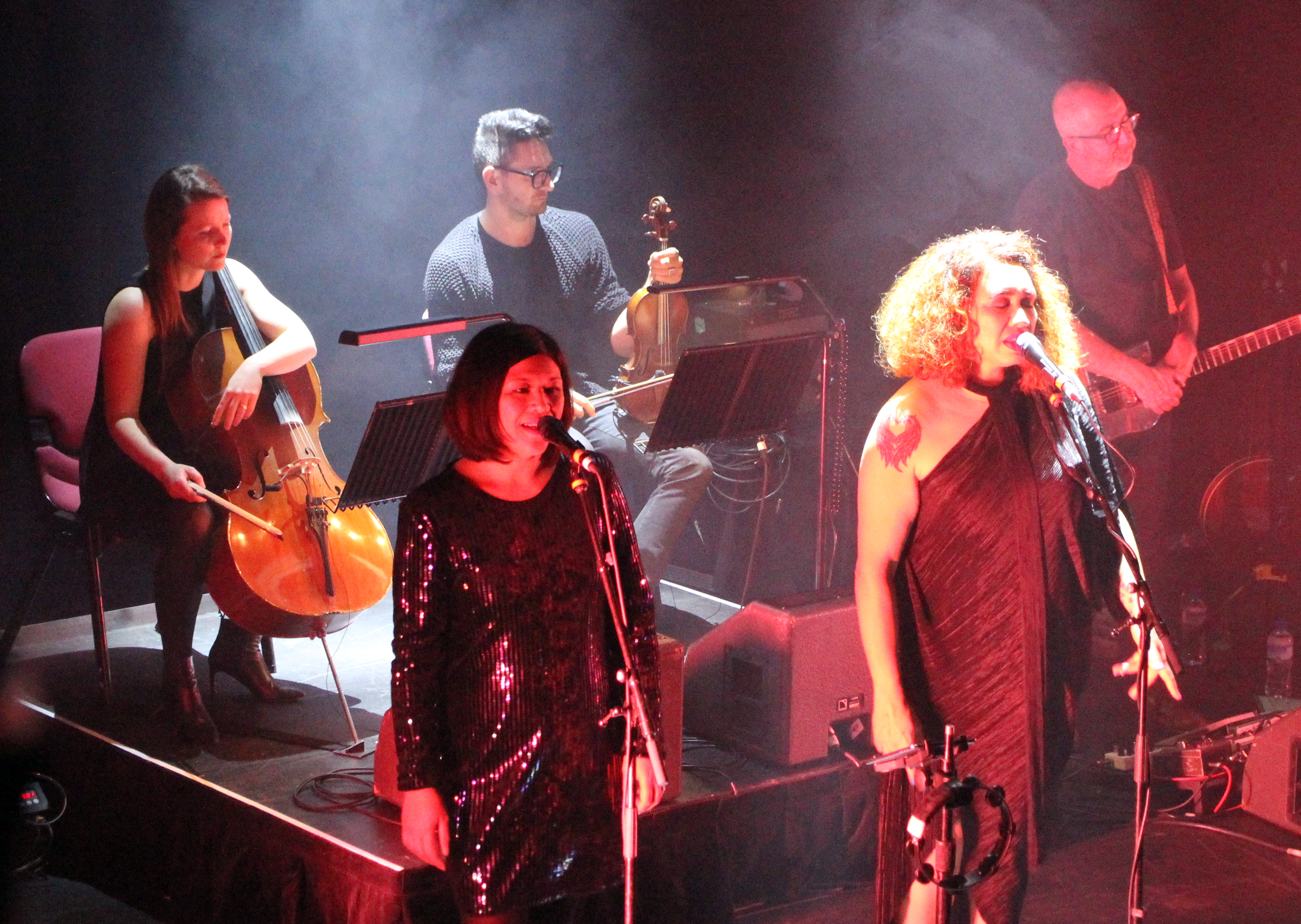
  Rachel Wells, Stephanie Paris, Mahuia Bridgman-Cooper, Lisa Tomlins, David Long; Trinity Roots (from Wellington) at Q Theatre, Auckland 2018
  Rio Hemopo (backing vocals/bass)
- Ben Lemi (backing vocals/guitar/drums)

== Discography ==
Date of release	Title	Label	Peak	Certification	Catalog no.
Albums
2001	True		28; 13 (2018)	Platinum	
2004	Home, Land and Sea		6	Platinum	
2015	Citizen		6		
Live albums
2010	Music Is Choice		8		
EPs
2001	Trinity Roots				
