= True's vole =

Conservation status
- Near Threatened (IUCN 3.1)

Scientific classification
- Domain: Eukaryota
- Kingdom: Animalia
- Phylum: Chordata
- Class: Mammalia
- Order: Rodentia
- Family: Cricetidae
- Subfamily: Arvicolinae
- Genus: Hyperacrius
- Species: H. fertilis

Binomial name
- Hyperacrius fertilis (F. W. True, 1894)

Species of rodent

True's vole (Hyperacrius fertilis) is a species of rodent in the family Cricetidae. It is found in India and Pakistan.
