= Kids with a Cause =

Kids with a Cause is a non-governmental organization (NGO) associated with the Department of Public Information of the United Nations, that allows the charity to expand its services to children around the world. Linda Finnegan founded the charity in September 1999, to teach principles and practices of philanthropy implemented through interactive programs involving celebrities and other youth volunteers. Their goal is "to provide solutions to specific problems affecting children who suffer from poverty, lack of education or health-related issues".

Members are responsible for the development and implementation of programs and projects designed to improve the quality of life for the less fortunate youth. These programs help to fulfill basic needs and enhance self-esteem.

== Linda Finnegan ==
Linda Finnegan is a native from Southern Californian who began working with children at eleven years old when she created a local babysitting service. She holds a Child Development associate degree from the Child Development Consortium in Washington, DC. Linda was awarded with “Excellence” in all thirteen areas of her discipline when she graduated. Her education focused on child psychology/development and early childhood education. Linda also received training in exceptional children and perceptual motor assessment training.

Before she became involved with nonprofit organizations, Linda was involved in several areas involving children including teaching, enhancing educational curriculum, direction of summer camps, and children's educational programs. She is also a published author and wrote and directed children's academic and theatrical workshops. Companies including American Express, Deloitte & Touche, Grolier Interstate, Nabisco Brands, and Times Mirror use training programs that Linda has developed.

Linda's first step in the non-profit world was her position as executive director of the Audrey Hepburn Children's Fund in Los Angeles, California.

== Kids With a Cause Projects ==
Linda's organization held projects in four main areas: Rodriguez Island, Fiji, Mexico, and the United States.

In Rodriquez Island, living conditions are extremely hostile with no electricity, running water, and poor housing conditions. While the Kids With a Cause organization tries to provide basic supplies for urgent needs, they understand that changes to the society need to be made to provide stability. The organization is currently gathering information as well as obtaining funds for drilling wells since fresh water is scarce.

In Fiji, the organization focused its attention on improving means of education. The organization was able to deliver 10 refurbished laptop computers that were donated along with large amounts of school supplies.

In Tijuana, Mexico, volunteers visited orphanages to provide basic cleaning and hygienic supplies while spending time with the children. Volunteers taught the children new games and crafts while staff were educated on nutritional meals.

In the United States, Kids with a Cause was one of the first to respond to the Tornado of May 7, 2007 in Greensburg, Kansas. They organized a community luncheon so that families and friends could reunite. Volunteers used games as a distraction for children. Participants could win prizes that included new clothing, stuffed animals, books, toys and many other items.

== Collaborations ==
BioCalth International Corporation announced on October 26, 2002, that they would be launching a new foundation called The BioCalth Foundation. The purpose would be to “help less fortunate children realize their educational goals and dreams”. At the press conference Jackson Wen, President of BioCalth Foundation announced that “a portion from the sale of each bottle of their newly developed children's vitamin and calcium formula called BioCalth Kids, will be donated directly to Kids With A Cause”.

== Celebrity Volunteers ==
Hilary Duff, who is known from her Disney franchise Lizzie McGuire, is one of the celebrity youths who collaborates with the organization. Billboard magazine featured the star in July 2003 discussing how a portion of the money raised by her licensing campaigns with Bravo will go towards The Kids with a Cause charity. Her funds will contribute to "everything from pet rescue to foster kids' care".

Courtnee Draper, best known for her roles in Disney Channel hits such as The Jersey, Stepsister from the Planet Weird, as well as on CTV's soap opera The Bold and the Beautiful also contributes to the charity. She not only donates to the charity but participates in special appearances. During the Biocath news conference on October 26, 2002, at the Pacific Palms Conference Resort in Industry Hills, California, the star appeared and performed for guests.
