= Peter Sims (writer) =

American author and entrepreneur

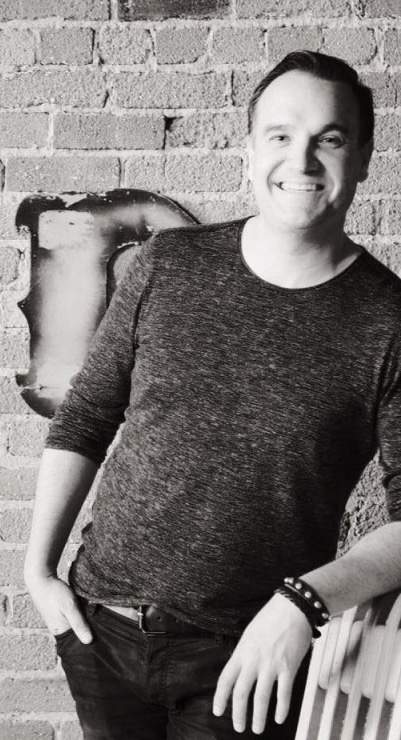
- Sims in 2015
- Born: July 29, 1976 (age 50)
- Education: Bowdoin College, Stanford Business School
- Occupation: Entrepreneur
- Writing career
- Genre: Non-fiction
- Notable work: True North Little Bets Black Sheep

Peter Eagle Sims (born July 29, 1976) is an American writer, entrepreneur, and investor. Sims is the founder of BLK SHP (Black Sheep), a platform for humanist innovation and investing. He also works as a resident advisor at Google[x], The Moonshot Factory, Alphabet's innovation laboratory. Previously, he worked as an investor at Summit Partners in London where he co-founded the firm's European office. Sims has been praised as "one who knows his way around disruptive ideas."

He has authored three books including True North (2007), co-authored with Bill George, which was among the Wall Street Journal bestseller books. Others include Little Bets (2011), which was named one of the best advice books for entrepreneurs by the Wall Street Journal, and Black Sheep (2024).

As a social entrepreneur, Sims co-founded FUSE corps, a nonprofit fellowship organization that partners with mayors and local governments across the United States to help them solve urgent local challenges, such as homelessness, climate resilience, education and workforce development —supporting over 500 fellowships in 30 states. Additionally, Sims was part of the founding team for GivingTuesday, the philanthropy movement that has become a globally recognized day of giving to charity, and has raised more than $20 billion for nonprofit causes.

== Film ==
Sims and Orlando Bloom served as executive producers for the documentary film Earthbound. Directed by Farhoud Meybodi, the film explores the life of Nzambi Matee, a Kenyan innovator and entrepreneur who is tackling the plastic waste epidemic in her hometown of Nairobi. The film won numerous awards, including a 2023 Tribeca X Award in the feature film category.

== Education and Personal ==
Sims is a graduate of Bowdoin College and Stanford Business School, and also spent several years at Stanford's Hasso Plattner Institute of Design (the d.school) studying product design. He grew up in the rural foothills of Northern California, where his father was a county judge, and he attended Colfax High School.

His 3rd-great-grandfather, Jacob Gundlach, founded Gundlach Bundschu Winery in Sonoma in 1858, now the oldest family-owned winery in California.

== Works ==
- True North: Discover Your Authentic Leadership, ISBN 978-0-7879-8751-0, with Bill George, 2007.
- Little Bets: How Breakthrough Ideas Emerge from Small Discoveries, ISBN 978-0-7879-8751-0, 2011.
- Black Sheep: The Quest to Be Human in an Inhuman Time, ISBN 978-1-939714-25-1, 2024.
