= Little Bets =

2011 book by Peter Sims

Little Bets: How Breakthrough Ideas Emerge from Small Discoveries
- First edition
- Author: Peter Sims
- Language: English
- Published: 5 April 2011 Free Press
- Publication place: United States
- Pages: 224
- ISBN: 978-1439170427

Little Bets: How Breakthrough Ideas Emerge from Small Discoveries is a book written by Peter Sims, published by Free Press in January 2011.

The book promotes the idea of small-scale experimentation (or "little bets") as a key part of the creative process. Little bets allow innovators to try new ideas with low failure costs, but potentially large rewards. The book examines successful examples of "little bets" in the business and entertainment worlds, as well as relevant social science research.

Little Bets has been reviewed in The Wall Street Journal (where it was described as "An enthusiastic, example-rich argument for innovating in a particular way") and Kirkus Reviews (where it was described as "a veritable gumball machine of memorable anecdotes to inspire creativity").
