= The Soul Collector (1999 film) =

- Based on: The Soul Collector by Kathleen Kane
- Written by: Joyce Brotman
- Directed by: Michael M. Scott
- Starring: Bruce Greenwood; Melissa Gilbert; Hilary Duff; Ossie Davis; Scotty Leavenworth; Brent Anderson
- Music by: Dan Foliart
- Country of origin: United States
- Original language: English

Production
- Executive producers: Marian Brayton; Anne Carlucci
- Producer: Bill Scott
- Cinematography: Don E. Fauntleroy
- Editor: Andrew London
- Running time: 93 minutes
- Production company: Hearst Entertainment Productions

Original release
- Network: CBS
- Release: October 24, 1999

The Soul Collector is a 1999 American made-for-television romantic fantasy-drama film directed by Michael M. Scott.

== Plot ==
Zach (Bruce Greenwood) is a soul collector: an angel who collects souls to take up to heaven. He is sent to earth to live as a human for thirty days on a Texas cattle ranch. There, he falls in love with ranch owner Rebecca (Melissa Gilbert), a widowed single mother, and influences the lives of her son and the ranch workers.

== Cast ==
- Bruce Greenwood as Zacariah
- Melissa Gilbert as Rebecca
- Hilary Duff as Ellie
- Ossie Davis as Mordecai
- Scotty Leavenworth as Danny
- Brent Anderson as Sam Scott
- Buck Taylor as Charlie
- Clayton Adams as Bartender

== Reception ==
OK! summed it up: "An angel (Bruce Greenwood) chooses life on Earth as a human being, falls for a widow and is zapped by the emotions that we weepy mortals take for granted. City of Angels! we hear you cry – true, but this is better."

== DVD release ==
Echo Bridge Home Entertainment announced The Soul Collector on DVD.
