= Home, Land and Sea =

Studio album by TrinityRoots
- Released: 2004

TrinityRoots chronology
True (2001)	Home, Land and Sea (2004)

Home, Land and Sea is an album by New Zealand band, Trinity Roots, released in 2004.

The lyrics of this song suggest references to the colonisation of New Zealand by the British Crown. In particular, the Queen's inability to foresee implications of such colonisation.

== Track listing ==
1. "Aotearoa"
2. "Longs For You"
3. "The Dream"
4. "All We Be"
5. "Egos"
6. "Angel Song"
7. "Touches Me"
8. "Way I Feel"
9. "Home, Land & Sea"
