= Hilary Duff =

American actress and singer (born 1987)

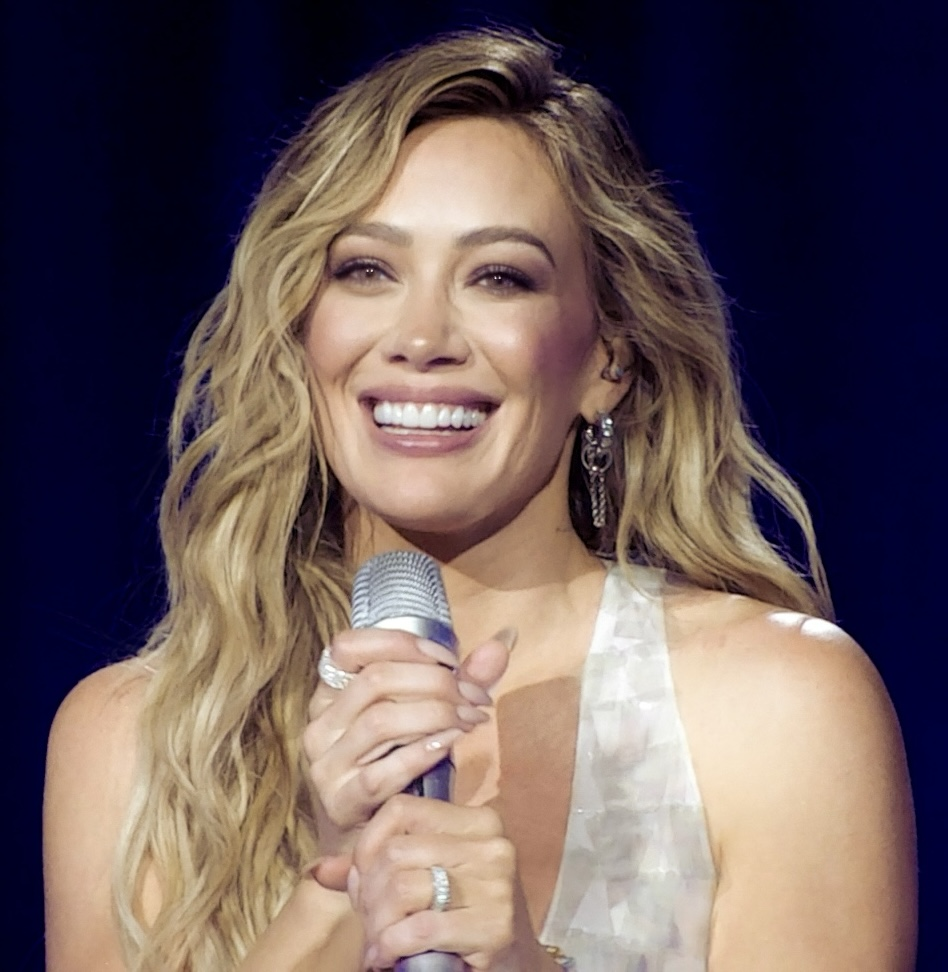
- Duff in 2026
- Born: Hilary Erhard Duff; September 28, 1987 (age 39); Houston, Texas, U.S.
- Occupations: Actress; singer-songwriter; businesswoman; author
- Years active: 1993–present
- Works: Discography; songs recorded; concerts
- Spouses: Mike Comrie (m. 2010; div. 2016) Matthew Koma (m. 2019)
- Children: 4
- Relatives: Haylie Duff (sister)
- Awards: Full list
- Musical career
- Genres: Pop; dance; rock
- Instrument: Vocals
- Labels: Buena Vista; Hollywood; RCA; Atlantic

Hilary Erhard Duff (born September 28, 1987) is an American actress, singer-songwriter, businesswoman, and author. Duff began her acting career at a young age, and was soon labeled a teen idol after playing the title character in the Disney Channel comedy series Lizzie McGuire (2001–2004) and the film based on the series, The Lizzie McGuire Movie (2003). Thereafter, she appeared in numerous mainstream films such as Cadet Kelly (2002), Agent Cody Banks (2003), Cheaper by the Dozen (2003), A Cinderella Story (2004), and Cheaper by the Dozen 2 (2005). In 2026, Time named her one of the 100 most influential people in the world.

She also appeared in independent films playing a wider range of adult-themed roles, such as War, Inc. (2008), According to Greta (2009), Bloodworth (2011), and The Haunting of Sharon Tate (2019). Duff starred as Kelsey Peters in TV Land's longest-running original series Younger (2015–2021) which earned her award nominations, and produced and starred as Sophie Tompkins in the Emmy-winning Hulu sitcom How I Met Your Father (2022–2023).

In 2002, Duff entered the music industry, and her debut studio album, the Christmas-themed Santa Claus Lane, was released that year through Walt Disney Records. Duff later signed with Hollywood Records and achieved greater success with her second album, Metamorphosis (2003), which topped the Billboard 200 chart and earned a 4× Platinum certification from the Recording Industry Association of America (RIAA). She also enjoyed significant commercial success with her subsequent albums, Hilary Duff (2004) and Dignity (2007), as well as the 2005 compilation Most Wanted which all went to be certified platinum and gold. Following a decrease in musical activity, Duff signed with RCA Records for her fifth album, Breathe In. Breathe Out. (2015), before transferring to Atlantic Records for her sixth album, Luck... or Something (2026). She has received media praise and has been noted as a blueprint for subsequent teen Disney Channel stars such as Miley Cyrus and Selena Gomez, and has sold an estimated 15 million records worldwide. Billboard ranked her at number 73 on their "Top 100 Women Artists of the 21st Century Chart" list. She appeared on Forbes' annual Celebrity 100 list from 2004 to 2007.

In addition to music and acting, she has also co-authored a trilogy of novels, beginning with Elixir (2010), which topped The New York Times Best Seller list, and followed by the sequels Devoted (2011) and True (2013). Duff's success in the entertainment industry led her to venture into business with fashion and fragrance lines of her own, such as Stuff by Hilary Duff, Femme for DKNY, and With Love... Hilary Duff. She is the Chief Brand Director of Below 60°, a line of home fragrance products. She has also invested in a number of businesses, ranging from cosmetics to children's products.

== Early life ==
Hilary Erhard Duff was born on September 28, 1987 in Houston. Her parents are Robert Erhard Duff, a partner in a chain of convenience stores, and Susan Colleen Duff (née Cobb), a homemaker turned film and music producer. She has an older sister named Haylie. She is a descendant of British Army officer Alexander Spotswood and of Catherine Carey. She grew up between Houston and San Antonio, where her father operated convenience stores. Encouraged by their mother, Duff, alongside her sister, enrolled in acting, singing, and ballet classes. The siblings earned roles in local theater productions, and later participated in a touring BalletMet production of The Nutcracker in San Antonio.

Increasingly interested in the pursuit of show business, the Duff sisters and their mother moved to California in 1993, while their father stayed in Houston to take care of his business. The sisters auditioned for several years and were cast in many television commercials. Due to her acting career, Hilary was home-schooled from the age of eight. The pair also modeled for various clothing brands. Hilary said, "My sister and I really showed an interest in [performing] and dedication, and [our mother] was like, 'How can I tell my kids no?' It's the same as kids that are going into sports. Parents support them and push them."

== Career ==
=== 1993–1999: Career beginnings ===
During the years she initially acted, Duff primarily played minor roles like her uncredited part in the Hallmark Entertainment western miniseries True Women (1997) and as an uncredited extra in the ensemble comedy-drama Playing by Heart (1998). The same year, Duff was cast in her first major role as Wendy in Casper Meets Wendy, based on the Harvey Comics characters. After appearing in the supporting role of Ellie in the television film The Soul Collector (1999), Duff received a Young Artist Award for Best Performance in a TV Movie or Pilot (Supporting Young Actress). In March 2000, Duff appeared as a sick child in the CBS medical drama series Chicago Hope. She was next cast as one of the children in the pilot episode of the NBC comedy series Daddio. Her Daddio co-star Michael Chiklis stated, "After working with her the first day, I remember saying to my wife, 'This young girl is gonna be a movie star.' She was completely at ease with herself and comfortable in her own skin." However, producers dropped Duff from the cast prior to the airing of the show.

=== 2000–2003: Mainstream success, Lizzie McGuire, and Metamorphosis ===
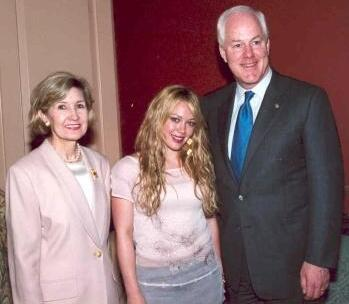
Duff with Texas Senators Kay Bailey Hutchison and John Cornyn, July 2004

A week after being dropped from Daddio, Duff landed the title role of a newly developed Disney Channel series, Lizzie McGuire. The program premiered on January 12, 2001, and received successful ratings, with an estimated 2.3 million viewers per episode. Duff quickly became labeled as a teen idol and household name, particularly within the show's pre-teen adolescent target demographic. Disney began marketing the series through soundtracks, books, dolls, toys, and video games based on Duff's character; the company reportedly made an estimated $100 million from the show's merchandise alone. The actress was featured in the Game Boy Advance video games that were created for her Lizzie McGuire character. Duff made her feature film debut in Human Nature (2001), in which she portrayed the younger version of Patricia Arquette's character. Duff also starred in the 2002 Disney Channel television film Cadet Kelly, for which she took a month of military training. The film became the network's most watched program in its then 19-year history.

Duff began making appearances on various soundtracks for the Disney Channel, recording a cover of the Brooke McClymont song "I Can't Wait" for the soundtrack to Lizzie McGuire. She later recorded a cover of "The Tiki Tiki Tiki Room" for DisneyMania. Upon expressing interest in a music career, production on Duff's debut Christmas-themed album began. Santa Claus Lane was released in October 2002, peaking in the lower portion of the Billboard 200 chart in the United States. The album was initially distributed through Walt Disney Records, with Buena Vista Records later re-releasing the project. It went on to receive a Gold certification from the Recording Industry Association of America (RIAA) for shipments exceeding 500,000 copies. The album was initially only released in North America, and received numerous re-releases in the following years. Duff later signed a recording contract with Andre Recke of Hollywood Records to release future recordings. Though her early music recordings garnered much airplay on Radio Disney, Recke and Buena Vista Records envisioned Duff appealing to a more mature audience.

In March 2003, Duff stars in the adventure, action comedy film Agent Cody Banks alongside Frankie Muniz. Scott Foundas of Variety called Duff's performance "charming", but thought she was "sidelined with little to do much of the time". The same year, Duff reprised her role as Lizzie McGuire for The Lizzie McGuire Movie. Duff recorded the original song "What Dreams Are Made Of" for the film's finale, which was later included on the film's soundtrack. She also recorded the single "Why Not", which charted within the top 20 in Australia, the Netherlands, and New Zealand. The soundtrack to The Lizzie McGuire Movie went on to be certified Platinum in Canada and 2× Platinum by the RIAA.

Duff released her second studio album, Metamorphosis, in August 2003. The album received mixed reviews from contemporary music critics. In the United States, it went on to reach the top of the Billboard 200 chart. The album became a major success for Duff, selling over five million copies within its first two years of release. Metamorphosis sold over three million copies in the United States, becoming her highest selling album to date and earning a 3× Platinum certification from the RIAA. The album spawned the successful singles "So Yesterday" and "Come Clean". "So Yesterday" achieved Platinum status in Australia and "Come Clean" received a Gold certification from the RIAA in the United States. "Come Clean" was used as the theme song to the MTV series Laguna Beach: The Real Orange County. Metamorphosis earned Duff multiple awards and nominations following its release. Duff further promoted the album with the Metamorphosis Tour that ran from November to December 2003. Later that year, Duff co-starred as one of the twelve children of Steve Martin and Bonnie Hunt in the family comedy Cheaper by the Dozen, which remains her highest-grossing film to date. Slant Magazine reviewer Nick Schager wrote that Duff "does nothing more than look perky and stylish."

=== 2004–2006: Hilary Duff, Most Wanted, and film projects ===
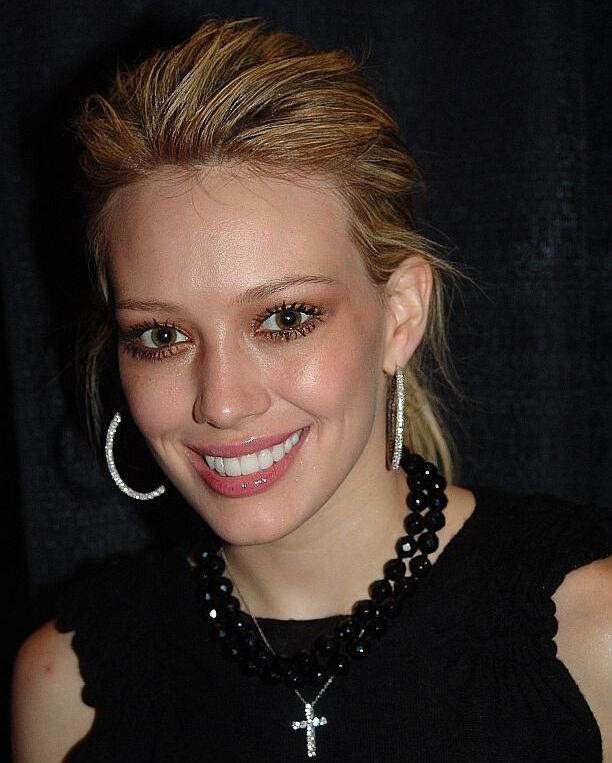
Duff at Ford's Theatre in Washington, D.C., 2005

Lizzie McGuire aired its final episode on February 14, 2004, following the fulfillment of Duff's 65-episode contract. Despite reports that the series was in talks for a second film and further television spin-off considered for sister network ABC, these plans fell through as Duff's salary for the proposal was insufficient.

In 2004, Duff starred opposite Chad Michael Murray in the romantic comedy A Cinderella Story. The film went on to become a moderate box office hit and received negative reviews. At the 2004 World Music Awards, she won the Best New Female Artist award. Her self-titled third studio album was released in September of that year. Duff was more involved in the production of this album than she had been in her previous record. The album, featuring prominent rock elements and drawing comparison to works from Avril Lavigne and Ashlee Simpson, debuted at number two on the Billboard 200 and went on to sell over 1.8 million copies in the United States. The album contained the single "Fly" which failed to chart on the Billboard Hot 100 but performed moderately worldwide. Later in the year, Duff starred in the musical drama Raise Your Voice, which was panned and unsuccessful at the box office. Several reviews were critical of her vocals, a number finding fault with what appeared to be her digitally enhanced voice. Her performances in A Cinderella Story and Raise Your Voice earned Duff her first Golden Raspberry Award (Razzie) nomination for Worst Actress in 2004. Duff launched her first clothing line, "Stuff by Hilary Duff", in 2004. The line was distributed by Target Corporation in the U.S., Kmart in Australia, Zellers in Canada, and Edgars Stores in South Africa from March 2004 until 2007.

In 2005, she starred alongside Heather Locklear in the film The Perfect Man, which went on to become a box office success. The Village Voice's Matt Singer wrote, "Duff plays her standard character—an introverted romantic who falls for a guy whose hunky exterior belies an artistic soul." That August, Duff released her first compilation album, Most Wanted. The album featured songs from Duff's previous albums, as well as remixes and new material. It included the hit single "Wake Up", which became her second single to be certified Gold by the RIAA. The compilation debuted at No. 1 on the Billboard 200, and sold over one million copies a month after its release. Duff later appeared in Cheaper by the Dozen 2, which resulted in her second Razzie nomination for Worst Actress in 2005. Mike Clarke of USA Today said, "Duff just looks like she'd rather be in a different movie."

Duff co-starred with her sister Haylie in the satirical comedy Material Girls (2006). The film earned both sisters a shared Razzie Award nomination for Worst Actress, becoming Duff's third consecutive nomination in three years. The sisters were also nominated for Worst Screen Couple. Hilary and Haylie collaborated on a cover of Madonna's single "Material Girl" for the film's soundtrack. Duff released her first perfume, "With Love... Hilary Duff", in September 2006. The line was distributed by the Elizabeth Arden company. Initially only sold in Macy's department stores, the fragrance became available in Europe, Japan, and Canada and was one of the three best-selling fragrances launched in department stores in 2006.

==== Stalking incidents ====
Also in 2006, Duff was stalked by Maksim (Max) Myaskovskiy, an 18 year old Russian immigrant, and his 50-year-old roommate David Joseph Klein, a celebrity photographer. She filed for restraining orders against the two men, claiming that Myaskovskiy "threatened to kill himself" to get her attention. She alleged that he threatened to "remove enemies" who stand in his way, including Duff's then-boyfriend Joel Madden. Myaskovskiy was sentenced to 117 days in prison and Duff rescinded her request for a restraining order against Klein.

=== 2007–2009: Dignity and independent films ===
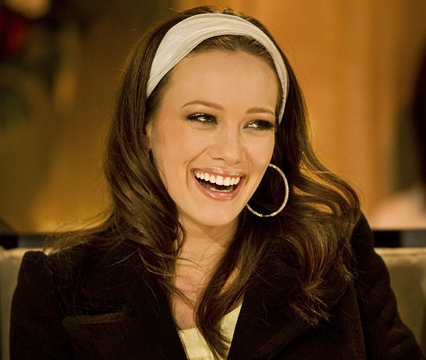
Duff at the 2007 Muchmusic Awards in Toronto

Duff co-wrote thirteen of the fourteen songs from her fourth album, working along with writers such as Kara DioGuardi. The finished product, Dignity (2007), featured production from Rhett Lawrence, Tim & Bob, and Richard Vission, resulting in a dance and electropop sound for the record. The album received critical praise, despite some critics calling Duff's vocals "weak". Dignity was praised for its lyrical content and new musical direction. The album dealt with topics such as her parents' divorce, her breakup with Joel Madden, and the stalking incident during the prior year. The television special Hilary Duff: This Is Now was produced to chronicle Duff's return to music. The two-part project aired on MTV before the album's release.

To further promote the album, Duff embarked on her fourth concert tour, the Dignity Tour, that ran from July 2007 through February 2008. Despite positive critical reception, Dignity failed to match the commercial success of her previous releases. Debuting at number three on the Billboard 200, the album received a Gold certification from the RIAA. It included the single "With Love", which went on to become her highest-charting single on the US Billboard Hot 100 at 24. Both "With Love" and the album's third single, "Stranger" topped the Billboard Hot Dance Club Play chart in the United States.

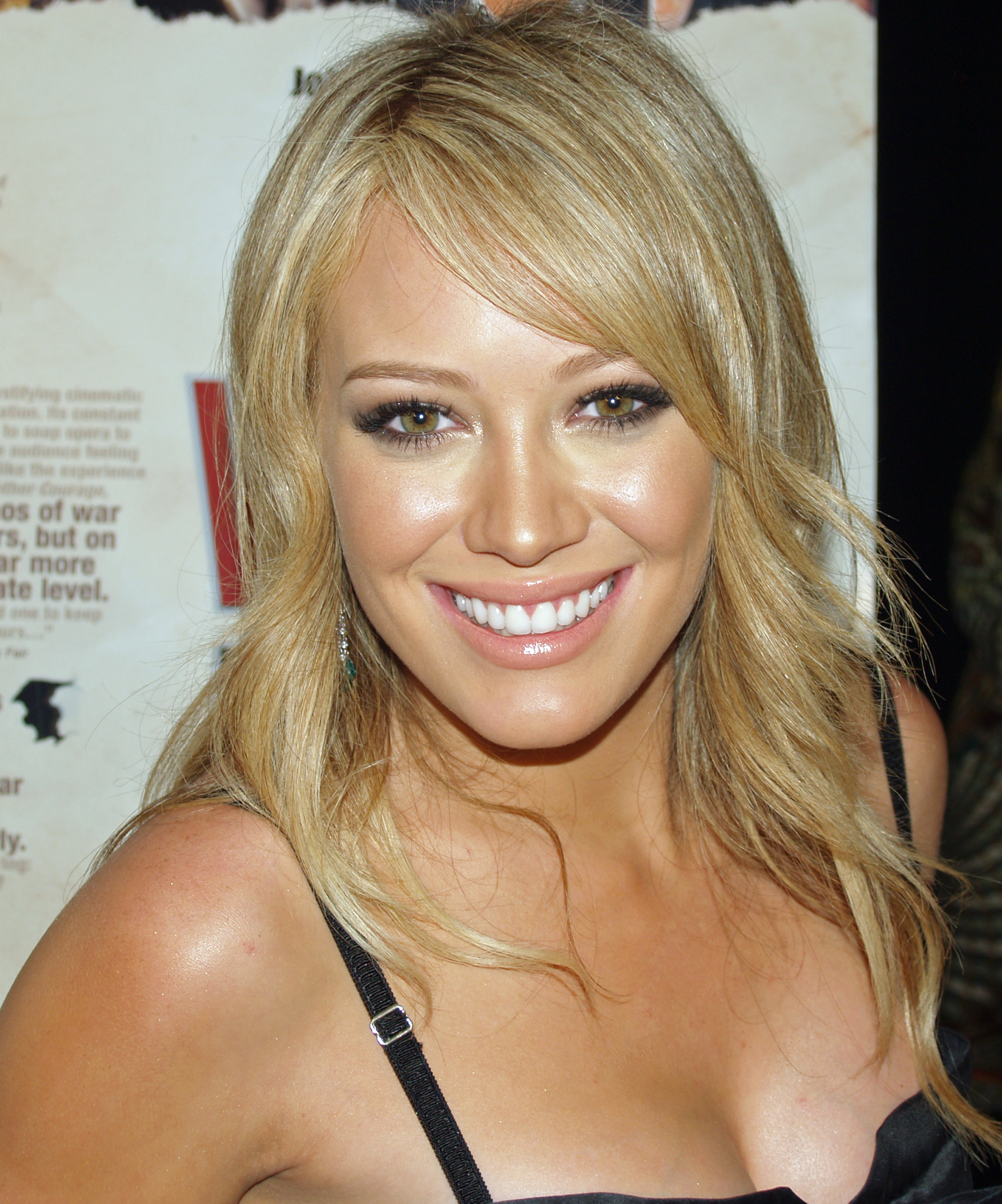
Duff at the premiere of War, Inc. at the Tribeca Film Festival in April 2008

Alongside the release of Dignity and the music videos for "With Love" and "Stranger", Duff began to adapt a more mature image. Duff's new image inspired some to consider her a "sex symbol". This image was reinforced by her appearance in the political satire film War, Inc. (2008), in which Duff portrayed an "oversexed" Central Asian pop star named Yonica Babyyeah. The film received a limited release in the United States. Duff recorded the songs "Boom Boom Bang Bang" and "I Want to Blow You Up" for the film. A re-release of Dignity was initially announced for a 2008 release, but Hollywood Records instead released a greatest hits album.

Best of Hilary Duff (2008) received little promotion prior to its release, entering the Billboard 200 at number 125. It became her first album released in the United States to not receive a certification from the RIAA. The compilation included the single "Reach Out", which samples the Depeche Mode song "Personal Jesus". The song featured provocative lyrics referencing sex, while its music video similarly saw Duff in a more risqué light. The song became her third consecutive single to top the Hot Dance Club Play chart in the United States. She announced to MTV that she would begin writing another album in December 2008, but it was never developed. That same year, Duff ceased to have control over Stuff by Hilary Duff, thus the line was discontinued.

Duff in 2009

Duff had a leading role as the title character of the film According to Greta (2009), which chronicled the life of a suicidal and rebellious teen. Her performance received mixed reviews. Andrew Barker of Variety criticized Duff's "child star" approach to acting and wanted her to stay away from teen roles. However, Los Angeles Times critic Robert Abele wrote that her attempt to "transform her bright-eyed wholesomeness into rebellious snark" in Greta "is a valiant one." Later that year, she co-starred as a narcissistic seductress in What Goes Up. Brian Lowry of Variety magazine stated that Duff's performance "amounts to a near-adult role," yet labeled her role and the film "confused". For the film's soundtrack, Duff recorded the song "Any Other Day". Despite having previously turned down a role in The CW drama 90210 to avoid projects within the "teen" genre, it was later confirmed that Duff would appear as a recurring character in the third season of the hit series Gossip Girl. Duff portrayed famous actress Olivia Burke, who enrolled at New York University in search of a traditional college experience. Duff's character sparked a romantic relationship with male lead character Dan Humphrey, and was later the center of controversy when the two had a threesome with Humphrey's friend Vanessa Abrams. The following year, she won a Teen Choice Award for Best Television Female Scene Stealer for her appearance on Gossip Girl. In 2009, Duff collaborated with DKNY Jeans and co-designed an apparel line titled Femme for DKNY Jeans. With the objective of designing a clothing line for women her own age, the line debuted in the United States in August 2009 and was available for a limited time.

=== 2010–2013: Other endeavors ===
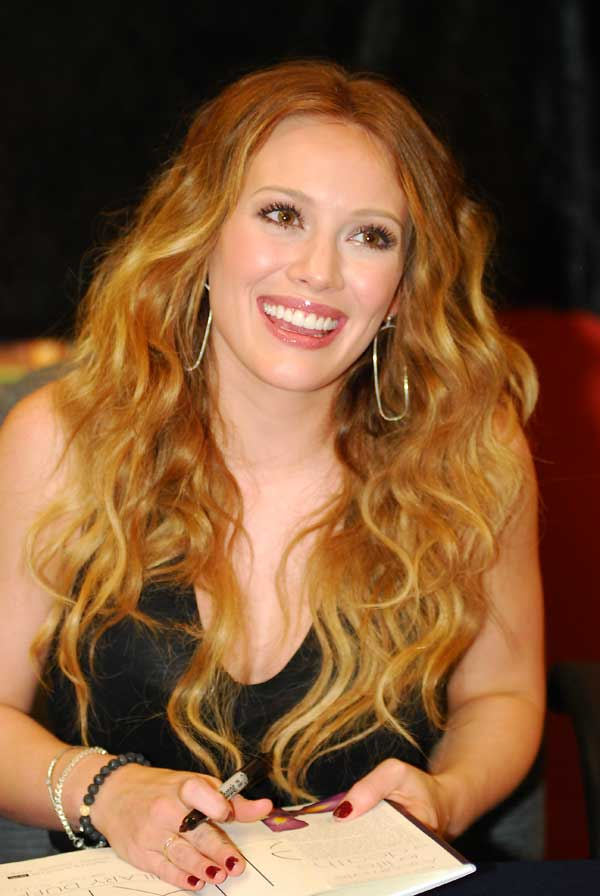
Duff at a signing for Elixir in Naperville, Illinois, October 2010

Duff continued to appear in film roles, starring in the ABC Family television film Beauty & the Briefcase (2010), where she also served as an executive producer. The film saw Duff as a fashion magazine columnist who wrote about her dating struggles in the city. The premiere received 2.4 million viewers, attracting a strong female audience that drove the network to an all-time high in viewers. Following this appearance, she made another in an episode of the NBC sitcom Community. She then co-starred as Raven Halfacre, the teenage daughter of a promiscuous alcoholic, in the drama Bloodworth. Her performance was generally praised, with The Examiner writing that the "biggest surprise performance [in the film] probably belongs to Hilary Duff." In 2010, Duff set up a book-writing deal with Simon & Schuster. She collaborated with Elise Allen on a young adult novel titled Elixir which was published in October 2010 and became a New York Times best-seller.

In 2011, Duff co-starred in the independent comedy Stay Cool (2011), which was critically panned. Duff had a major role in the movie alongside Winona Ryder. Devoted, the sequel to Duff's authorial debut, was released in October 2011. In January 2012, Duff confirmed that she had again begun working on music. Throughout 2012, Duff primarily worked with Ali Tamposi, Matt Squire, and Jason Evigan, but these works were not released. The same year, she co-starred in Rob Margolies' comedy She Wants Me, as a well-known starlet who enters a love triangle. In August 2012, Duff signed a deal with 20th Century Fox to develop and produce a sitcom in which she would star, but this plan failed to develop. She appeared as a guest judge in Project Runway that September.

In early 2013, Duff guest starred in the Fox sitcom Raising Hope. She later guest starred in the tenth season finale of the CBS sitcom Two and a Half Men. Duff provided voice work for the animated film Wings, alongside Jesse McCartney and Josh Duhamel; she later appeared in its sequel the following year. By July 2013, Duff had finished filming the independent film Flock of Dudes, which was released in September 2016. That same year, Duff released the third and final novel in her Elixir trilogy, titled True (2013).

=== 2014–2018: Breathe In. Breathe Out. and television success with Younger ===
On January 15, 2014, Duff signed on to co-star opposite Sutton Foster in the comedy-drama pilot Younger. The series is based on a Pamela Redmond Satran novel, and created and executive-produced by Darren Star for TV Land. Duff was cast as Kelsey Peters, an "ambitious 20-something" who persuades Foster's character to work in a publishing firm. In April 2014, it was announced that the pilot was picked up for a series with a 12-episode deal. The show marked Duff's first starring role in a television series since her appearance on Lizzie McGuire. Younger premiered on March 31, 2015. The series received generally positive reviews from critics and her performance as Kelsey Peters earned her acclaim. She received nominations for Favorite Cable TV Actress at the 2016 and 2017 People's Choice Awards, two Teen Choice Awards nominations, and a nomination for the Gracie Allen Awards.

Duff attended the 2014 iHeartRadio Music Awards on May 1, 2014, where she confirmed that she was working with songwriter Savan Kotecha and English singer Ed Sheeran. On July 23, 2014, it was revealed that Duff had signed with RCA Records. She released the single "Chasing the Sun" and its accompanying music video on July 29, 2014. The song entered the Billboard Hot 100 at number 79, becoming her first song to enter the chart since "Stranger" (2007). The song's music video garnered fourteen million views in its first week of release on the video sharing website YouTube. "All About You" was released as a single on August 12. It failed to enter the Hot 100 chart, but secured a placement on the Mainstream Top 40 chart. It became a top-twenty hit in Australia, where it later earned a Gold certification from the ARIA. In November 2014, Duff provided voice work for a special Dora the Explorer episode as Jessica the Ice Witch.

On April 6, 2015, Duff released the single "Sparks" from her fifth studio album Breathe In. Breathe Out. which debuted and peaked at number 93 on the Billboard Hot 100 and became her fourth top ten hit on the Billboard Dance Club Songs chart. Breathe In. Breathe Out was released on June 12, 2015. It debuted at number 5 on the Billboard 200, becoming her fifth top-five album. Duff had planned to tour in support of the album in early 2016, but announced in February 2016 that she would not be touring. The album was Duff's first studio effort to not have received any certification from RIAA, and is her only album release under RCA Records.

In January 2016, Duff's cover of Fleetwood Mac's "Little Lies" was released, to coincide with the second season of the series Younger which she starred in. It was Duff's final release under RCA Records. In June 2016, Duff revealed that she was working on a new album. In contrast to Breathe In. Breathe Out, she said that the new album would have a "darker and heavier tone". She teased a new song titled "Tied to You" via a Snapchat post. The following January, Duff became one of the investors for the cosmetic line Kopari Beauty.

Duff returned to working in fashion design in January 2018, launching the "Muse x Hilary Duff" collection, a collaborative eyewear line with GlassesUSA. Further collaborations resulted in the line being the best-selling brand for GlassesUSA's premium brand category. In February 2018, she announced that she would star as the title character in the independent film The Haunting of Sharon Tate, relating to the Tate murders. Written and directed by Daniel Farrands, Duff served as an executive producer on the film. She starred alongside Lydia Hearst and former Cheaper by the Dozen 2 co-star, Jonathan Bennett. The film was released in April 2019; at the 2019 Hollywood Reel Independent Film Festival, Duff won the Best Actress award.The Haunting of Sharon Tate was panned by mainstream film critics and Variety called Duff "too contemporary" to portray Sharon. Debra Tate, the sister of the late Sharon, expressed disapproval of the project. The film was nominated for several categories at the 40th Golden Raspberry Awards, of which Duff was awarded Worst Actress. Later that year, Duff appeared in an episode in the tenth season of Who Do You Think You Are?. In September 2018, it was confirmed that Duff would voice the lead character in the animated film Meet Your Tooth Fairy. In November, Duff alongside several celebrities were named investors in the 2-in-1 children's product "Cubcoat". She also launched a capsule collection under her sister Haylie's children clothing line "Little Moon Society".

=== 2019–2024: Scrapped Lizzie McGuire revival, How I Met Your Father and entrepreneurship ===
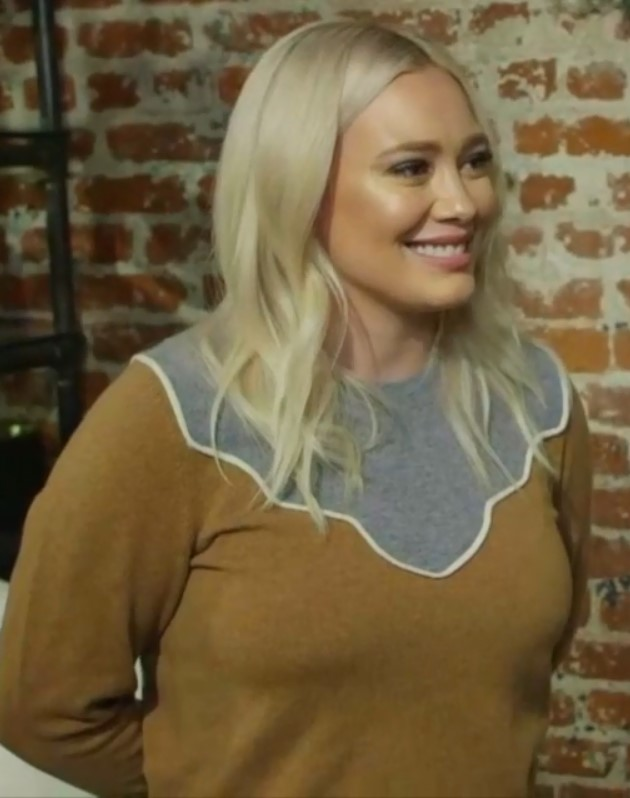
Duff in 2019

In January 2019, Duff and comedian Chelsea Handler invested in the cosmetics line "Nudestix". She launched her own make-up kit under the partnership, "Daydreamer", in September 2019. Earlier in July, Younger was announced to be renewed for a seventh and final season, becoming the network's longest-running original series.

Duff announced at the D23 Expo in August 2019 that she would reprise her role as the titular character in a revival of the Lizzie McGuire series on the streaming service Disney+. The creator Terri Minsky was to return as the showrunner, with Duff serving as an executive producer. The series' storyline was to revolve around Lizzie as a 30-year-old navigating life in New York City. However, on January 9, 2020, following the filming of two episodes, it was reported that Minsky departed as showrunner due to "creative differences", and the production of the series was halted. The following month, Duff revealed that Disney+ had restricted the project to a PG rating. She felt that restricting it to this rating would be a "disservice" to fans and urged for it to be instead moved to Hulu. In July 2020, Duff affirmed that she was "optimistic that [the revival] will happen". However, on December 16, 2020, she confirmed that the revival was scrapped by Disney+. On the same day, Disney released a statement to USA Today, reasoning that fans of the show "have high expectations for any new stories", and that they would hold off the show "until we are confident we can meet those expectations".

In November 2019, Duff became co-owner and the chief brand officer of Naturalena Brands' line of products: the baby products brand "Happy Little Camper" and the feminine care products brand "Veeda". The collaboration led to a lawsuit, in which Duff alleged that Naturalena Brands used the COVID-19 pandemic as the reason to end their agreement with Duff. A settlement was reached in April 2022.

In February 2020, music producer RAC released the single "Never Let You Go" a cover of the hit from the band Third Eye Blind, which featured both Duff and her husband Matthew Koma on vocals. Later that month, Duff made a cameo in the music video for "CVS" by Koma's band, Winnetka Bowling League; in May, she made a second cameo in the music video for the band's single "Kangaroo". In May 2020, it was reported that Duff would star in a Younger spinoff series, reprising her role as Kelsey Peters. In April 2021, Younger's creator Darren Star described the spinoff as a "female Entourage", focusing on Kelsey Peters in Los Angeles. On June 10, 2021, it was announced that the spin-off was no longer in the works. The Younger soundtrack album was released in July 2021; the soundtrack included Duff's 2016 cover of Fleetwood Mac's "Little Lies" and her 2019 cover of Dolly Parton's "9 to 5" which she performed in the season six premiere with Sutton Foster and Miriam Shor.

Duff released the children's picture book My Little Brave Girl in March 2021, which was published by Random House Children's and illustrated by Kelsey Garrity-Riley. Duff said that she was inspired to write the book by her daughter. It debuted at No. 8 on The New York Times best-seller list on the children's picture books category. Its sequel, My Little Sweet Boy, was released in November 2023.

Duff announced in April 2021 that she would star in a spinoff of How I Met Your Mother titled How I Met Your Father. Duff produced and starred in the show as Sophie. A ten-episode run was ordered by Hulu and filming for the spinoff began in August 2021 in Los Angeles. The series premiered on January 18, 2022, and was met with mixed reception. On February 15, 2022, Hulu renewed the series for a 20-episode second season. In September 2023, Hulu cancelled the series after two seasons.

Duff continued to make a number of business ventures beginning 2021 onwards. She collaborated with the romper company Smash + Tess to design a collection of rompers for mothers and children; it launched on February 23, 2021, and reportedly sold out within minutes. On May 18, 2022, Duff became the Chief Mom Officer of the children's apparel company Carter's; via the collaboration, she designed a children's clothing capsule collection. In November 2023, she unveiled a new business venture as Chief Brand Director of Below 60°, a line of home fragrance products launched that same month.

=== 2025–present: Luck... or Something and Pretty Ugly ===
Below 60° was made available on QVC in early 2025, and Duff has since appeared on the channel to promote the brand and its products. In August 2025, it was announced that Duff will be starring and executive producing a new drama series titled Pretty Ugly, which will be streamed at Hulu. The series is based on the novel of the same name by American author Kirker Butler. It will be written by Butler and directed by Silver Tree.

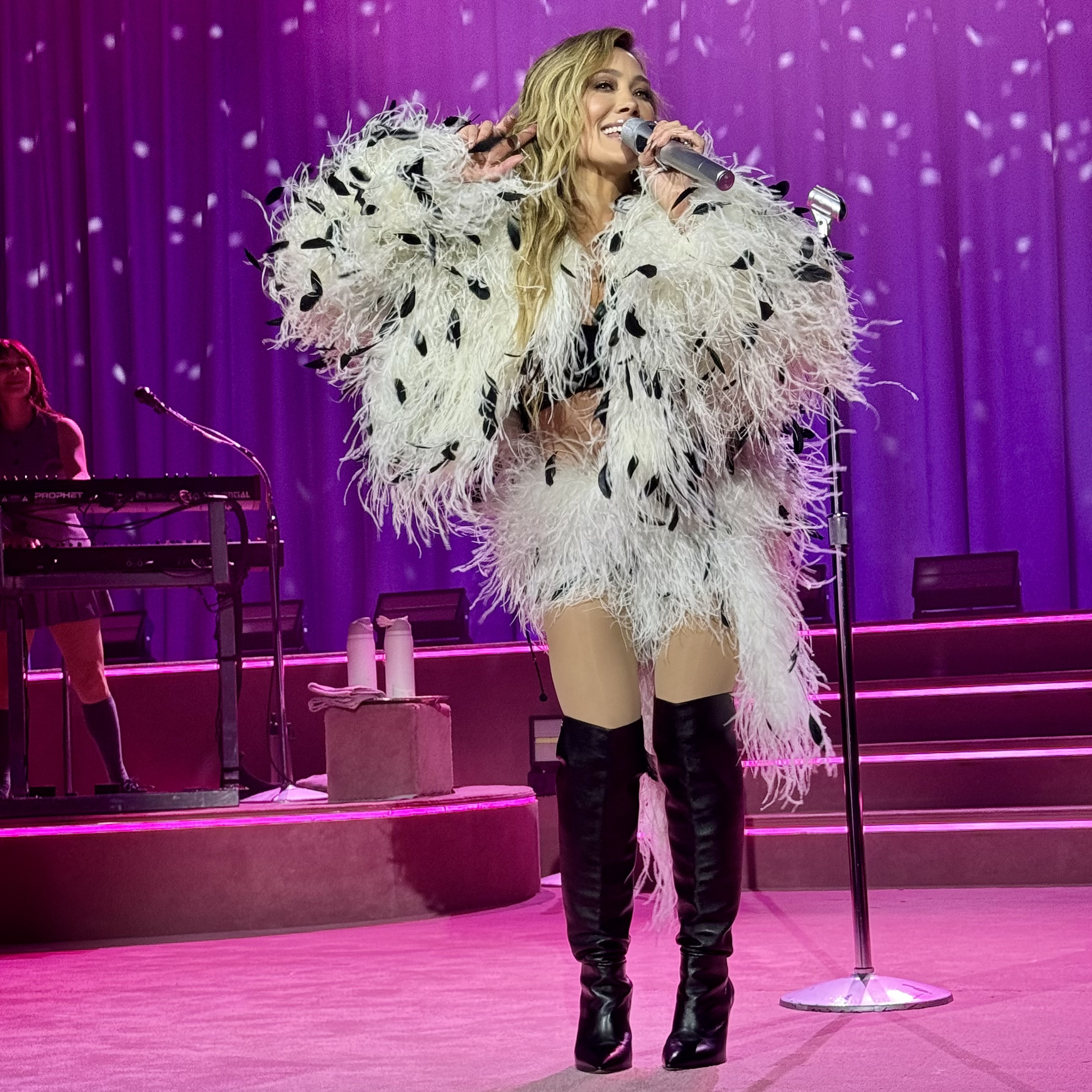
Duff performing in 2026

A month later, it was announced she had signed with Atlantic Records to release new music. There will also be an accompanying docu-series chronicling what Atlantic calls Duff's "musical comeback". During an appearance at Vogue World: Hollywood 2025, she disclosed her desire to feel safe before returning to music, and had been working with Koma on the project, which would be heard in "the blink of an eye". Duff released the single "Mature" on November 6, 2025, followed by the album’s second single "Roommates" on January 15, 2026. The album, titled Luck... or Something, was released on February 20, 2026. Atlantic Records dubbed the album her "boldest and most self-assured" project to date. In January 2026, she embarked on the Small Rooms, Big Nerves Tour, a small-capacity theater tour of London, Brooklyn, Toronto, Los Angeles and Las Vegas; tickets went to general sale on November 14, 2025, and sold out instantly. Duff announced The Lucky Me Tour on February 12, 2026, in support of Luck... or Something. The tour commenced in June 2026 and while it was initially to end in February 2027, it was further extended until November 2027 to include dates in Latin America, Europe and United States. She will also be headlining the 2026 KIIS-FM Jingle Ball.

Duff re-recorded several of her previous hits as bonus tracks on special editions of Luck... or Something, with each track subtitled as "(Mine)". The re-recordings were consolidated on a limited Record Store Day special LP titled Mine released on April 18, 2026. It was released on silver vinyl and subsequently on streaming. In addition to Mine, Duff has released several other musical projects throughout 2026, since Luck… or Something. She released "CATastrophe" on October 2, 2026, as part of the soundtrack to The Cat in the Hat, and the Christmas-themed EP Holiday Things on October 23, 2026. Holiday Things is her first Christmas-themed release since 2002's Santa Claus Lane and includes three new original tracks, in addition to two covers, including a "(Mine)" version of "Last Christmas", firstly recorded on Santa Claus Lane.

Throughout 2026, Duff has enjoyed a significant renewal of public attention. She was featured as one of the cover models of the 2026 issue of the Sports Illustrated Swimsuit Issue, alongside Nicole Williams English, Alix Earle, and Tiffany Haddish and was the first celebrity partnership for fitness app Ladder. Duff was then unveiled as the campaign ambassador for Bath & Body Works' "Fruity Fusion" franchise in July 2026 and for Reebok's "Unfiltered & Unstoppable" campaign in August 2026.

== Artistry ==
With her second album Metamorphosis, Duff's music featured prominent pop and pop rock elements. Listening to rock music as a child was her main influence behind its theme. She worked heavily with The Matrix for the album, leading critics to compare the effort to releases from artists such as Avril Lavigne, Ashlee Simpson, and Lindsay Lohan. These themes were featured more prominently on her third studio album, Hilary Duff. The album makes further use of strong drum and guitar beats. Duff co-wrote multiple songs for the album, with the lyrics speaking on topics such as criticism, following your dreams, and love. The new material featured on her Most Wanted (2005) compilation album began to see Duff transfer towards a more pop and dance friendly sound. This was later expanded upon for her fourth studio album, Dignity (2007). Dignity was heavily influenced by Europop, hip hop, and rock 'n roll. Duff described the music as "dance", "rock", and "electro". Duff co-wrote all but one of the songs on the album, which dealt with topics including her stalker, her breakup with Joel Madden, and her parents' divorce. One retrospective on the album called it "a pop hallmark".

Duff's 2014 releases featured a more folk influenced, "earthy" indie pop sound, compared to her previous releases. The singles "Chasing the Sun" and "All About You" featured banjos. The following year, Duff released Breathe In. Breathe Out., a dance-pop record which balanced EDM with the folk pop sound originally planned for the record. This album consolidated Duff as a dance-pop singer.

== Image and legacy ==
Following the launch of Lizzie McGuire, Duff received a significant amount of fame and media attention. The series proved to be a major hit for the network, and led to a string of merchandising that included Lizzie McGuire dolls, video games, plush figures, and McDonald's Happy Meal Toys. The success of The Lizzie McGuire Movie "indicated that Duff's television fanbase could be migrated to film." Following her success from Lizzie McGuire, Richard Huff of the New York Daily News called Duff "a 2002 version of Annette Funicello" but admitted that the character of Lizzie McGuire was both a blessing and a burden for her. In 2003, Huff stated that Duff's public image is "tied" to Lizzie McGuire.

Duff was credited with the revival of Hollywood Records following the release of Metamorphosis (2003). The San Fernando Valley Business Journal wrote that the album was "giving Hollywood Records a needed shot in the arm" after a decline in CD sales during the previous two years had forced the label to reduce costs and alter its operation. Hilliard Lyons analyst Jeffrey Thomison said Metamorphosis was a reflection of Disney's ability to develop "great synergy between their cable, film and music segments" Duff's transition from Disney star to successful singer became a formula that Hollywood Records tried to implement with future acts such as Miley Cyrus, Selena Gomez, and Bridgit Mendler among others. Artists such as Cyrus, Gomez, Olivia Holt and Keke Palmer have all cited Duff as influences on their careers. Singer Taylor Swift has also used Duff's song, Breathe In. Breathe Out, as inspiration for her songs, Getaway Car and Paper Rings, acknowledging that Duff's song was her favorite cut from the album in a now deleted Tumblr post from June 25, 2015.

Her song "Come Clean" (2003) was used as the theme song for the MTV reality series Laguna Beach, which, in turn, helped promote the song in the United States. Her song "Sweet Sixteen" (2003) was used as the theme for the MTV reality series of the same name. Multiple dates on her Most Wanted Tour to promote Hilary Duff (2004) sold out in minutes. She had sold over fifteen million albums by 2014.

Some critics praised her transition from teenage star into adulthood. In 2005, Katie Long from the Centre of Parent/Youth Understanding wrote an analysis of Duff and her suitability as an idol for young teens. Duff, she wrote, "is not like Britney Spears or Christina Aguilera... yet" but remains "someone that adolescent girls can relate to." In 2007, Duff's appearance on the cover of Maxim was accompanied by the declaration that she had gone "from the queen of teen to breakout sex symbol." Following this, Duff placed at No. 23 on the annual Hot 100 Women list compiled by Maxim and peaked at No. 8 on the annual FHM list of the 100 Sexiest Women in 2008. The Associated Press wrote that this sudden provocativeness was representative of "a clear move [on Duff's part] to put her Lizzie McGuire past behind her", and that more provocative imaging of her would help her singles to garner mainstream radio play: "Ultimately, nature, time and genetics may help Duff in a way Disney, despite all its might, cannot." However, despite "the fact that she is grown up," Duff "has managed to maintain her sweet persona," wrote Young Hollywood.

=== Social media controversies ===
Duff garnered media attention on Halloween 2016 for the costumes she and then-boyfriend Jason Walsh wore to a party. Duff and Walsh wore a Pilgrim and Native American costume, respectively, drawing online criticism, with some social media users accusing them of cultural appropriation. Following the backlash, both Duff and Walsh posted apology messages on their respective social media accounts.

In May 2018, Duff uploaded a series of Instagram stories to her account, publicly condemning her New York apartment neighbor. She claimed he smoked "cigarettes and weed all night long" and that her "apartment reeks". Police later confirmed that an altercation had occurred between the neighbor and Duff's now-husband Matthew Koma. Duff's representative issued a statement saying "Hilary and her young son have been subjected to excessive secondhand smoke, late night noise, garbage in the hallways, and an overall hazardous living environment for months now." Duff's allegations of her neighbor's behavior were corroborated by other neighbors, including journalist Shelley Ross.

=== Disapproval of paparazzi ===
Duff is very vocal about her disapproval of paparazzi photographing children. In 2014, Duff expressed her anger on Twitter regarding two paparazzi who were taking pictures of her son without her consent. She tweeted, "I chose to let them off with a stern warning, next time I will not be so nice. #NoKidsPolicy". The hashtag refers to a bill that was pushed by fellow actresses Halle Berry and Jennifer Garner, which prohibits paparazzi from taking pictures of celebrities' children.

In February 2020, Duff uploaded an Instagram video documenting her confrontation with a photographer who was photographing her children at her son's football game. In the video she was seen telling the photographer, "I'm asking you human to human, as a mother, if you don't know anyone here, can you please stop taking pictures of our children playing football this morning". She clarified the situation in a series of Instagram stories uploads the day after, saying that it was "really highly frustrating" and that the police dismissed her complaint because she was at a public park when the incident happened. She voiced her dissatisfaction and demanded that the law be changed. The video has since been viewed more than 2 million times as of November 2020.

== Personal life ==
=== Relationships ===
In 2001, it was confirmed that Duff was in a relationship with fellow teen star Aaron Carter. He later guest-starred in an episode of Lizzie McGuire with her. The relationship garnered media attention with reports of a love triangle between Duff, Carter, and actress Lindsay Lohan. Duff and Carter continued an on-again, off-again relationship for three years, before ultimately ending their relationship.

In July 2004, 16-year-old Duff began dating Good Charlotte singer Joel Madden, who was then 25 years old. After a long period of tabloid speculation, Duff's mother, Susan, announced their relationship in a June 2005 interview for Seventeen magazine. Madden worked with Duff on her compilation album, Most Wanted. In November 2006, Duff and Madden broke up. In 2015, Paper magazine observed that the media chose not to call the relationship illegal even though Duff was underage at the time.

Duff began dating National Hockey League (NHL) player Mike Comrie, from Edmonton, Alberta, in 2007. Duff and Comrie announced their engagement in February 2010, and married on August 14, 2010, in Santa Barbara, California. Duff announced her pregnancy in 2011, and gave birth to their son on March 20, 2012. On January 10, 2014, Duff and Comrie announced that they had amicably separated and would continue to co-parent their son. In February 2015, Duff filed for divorce from Comrie, citing irreconcilable differences, and requesting primary physical and legal joint child custody of their son. The divorce was finalized in February 2016.

She and singer-songwriter Matthew Koma initially dated for a few months before breaking up in March 2017. That December, Duff confirmed they had rekindled their relationship. They got engaged in May 2019 and were married on December 21, 2019. They have three daughters: born 2018, 2021, and May 2024.

=== Family ===
In March 2026, Duff discussed being estranged from both her older sister, Haylie, and father, Bob Duff. She confirmed that two songs from her Luck... or Something album, "The Optimist" and "We Don't Talk", were based on her strained relationships from her father and sister, respectively.

=== Education ===
On January 31, 2005, Duff began taking classes at Harvard University as part of the Harvard Extension School, one of the 12 schools in the Harvard University system.

== Philanthropy ==
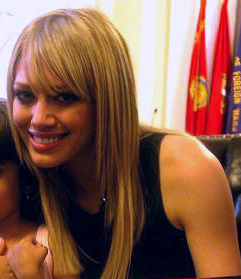
Duff at the launch of the annual National Military Families Week in Washington, D.C., June 2005

Duff has been involved with various philanthropic activities. She donated $250,000 to help the victims of Hurricane Katrina and donated over 2.5 million meals to Hurricane Katrina victims in the southern US in 2005. In August 2006, Duff traveled to a New Orleans elementary school and worked with USA Harvest to distribute meals.

She has helped various youth charities and is a member of Kids with a Cause. Duff has also served on the advisory board of the Audrey Hepburn Child Benefit Fund and the Celebrity Council of Kids with a Cause. A supporter of LGBTQ+ rights, in October 2008 Duff starred in a public service announcement for The Think Before You Speak Campaign by Ad Council and GLSEN to prevent youth from using anti-LGBT vocabulary, such as the phrase "That's So Gay." In July 2009, Duff was named as a youth ambassador to the children of the Colombian capital, Bogotá. As a youth ambassador, she spent five days in the country, distributing backpacks filled with food to children in need.

In 2012, she was involved in the Johnson's Baby Cares campaign, which included activities such as sending care kits and care cards to new mothers across the U.S. as a motivation. It also raised funds for children and low-income families in partnership with Save the Children. In November 2013, Duff teamed up with Duracell in Canada for a campaign for kids in hospitals. The campaign donated 20,000 batteries to hospitals across Canada. To promote the campaign, Duff visited The Hospital for Sick Children in Toronto, Ontario. She also discussed the campaign on the radio show Breakfast Television Toronto and in numerous magazine interviews.

She has participated in various online charity campaigns, including a partnership with Claritin. Duff raised relief efforts for the 2018 Hanalei floods via sales of her "Muse x Hilary Duff Collection". She also published a 2017 essay through Marie Claire about the damages that Hurricane Harvey left on her hometown. In 2020, Duff and Matthew Koma, her husband, donated to the Australian bushfires relief efforts. Also that year, she donated baby products to parents in need during the COVID-19 pandemic via her "Happy Little Camper" brand. In October 2020, she launched the "Veeda in Action" donation campaign, via her feminine care line "Veeda". Partnering with PERIOD, "a global, youth-powered non-profit that is fighting to end period poverty and period stigma through service, education, and advocacy", the donation campaign ran through the month of October to donate period products to those in need.

== Filmography ==
=== Film ===
Year	Title	Role	Notes
1998	Casper Meets Wendy	Wendy	
1998	Playing by Heart	Extra	Uncredited
2001	Human Nature	Young Lila Jute	
2003	Agent Cody Banks	Natalie Connors	
2003	The Lizzie McGuire Movie	Lizzie McGuire / Isabella Parigi	
2003	Cheaper by the Dozen	Lorraine Baker	
2004	A Cinderella Story	Samantha "Sam" Montgomery	
2004	Raise Your Voice	Terri Fletcher	
2004	In Search of Santa	Princess Crystal	Voice role
2005	The Perfect Man	Holly Hamilton	
2005	Cheaper by the Dozen 2	Lorraine Baker	
2006	Material Girls	Tanzie Marchetta	Also producer
2008	War, Inc.	Yonica Babyyeah	
2009	Stay Cool	Shasta O'Neil	
2009	What Goes Up	Lucy Diamond	
2009	According to Greta	Greta	Also executive producer
2011	Bloodworth	Raven Halfacre	
2012	She Wants Me	Kim Powers	
2012	Foodfight!	Sunshine Goodness	Voice role
2012	Wings	Windy	Voice role
2014	Wings: Sky Force Heroes	Windy	Voice role
2016	Flock of Dudes	Amanda L. Benson	
2019	The Haunting of Sharon Tate	Sharon Tate	Also executive producer

=== Television ===
Year	Title	Role	Notes
1997	True Women	Extra	Miniseries; uncredited
1999	The Soul Collector	Ellie	Television film
2000	Chicago Hope	Jessie Seldon	Episode: "Cold Hearts"
2001–2004	Lizzie McGuire	Elizabeth "Lizzie" McGuire	Lead role
2001–2005	Express Yourself	Herself	9 episodes
2002	Cadet Kelly	Kelly Collins	Television film
2003–2005	George Lopez	Stephanie / Kenzie	2 episodes
2003	American Dreams	The Shangri-Las Member	Episode: "Change a Comin"
2004	Frasier	Britney	Voice role; episode: "Frasier-Lite"
2005	Joan of Arcadia	Dylan Samuels	Episode: "The Rise & Fall of Joan Girardi"
2005	Dear Santa	Herself	Television film
2006	Rebelde	Herself	Episode: "3.100"
2007	The Andy Milonakis Show	Herself	Episode: "Andy Moves to L.A."
2007	Hilary Duff: This Is Now	Herself	2 episodes
2009	Ghost Whisperer	Morgan Jeffries	Episode: "Thrilled to Death"
2009	Law & Order: Special Victims Unit	Ashlee Walker	Episode: "Selfish"
2009	Gossip Girl	Olivia Burke	Recurring role (season 3); 6 episodes
2010	Beauty & the Briefcase	Lane Daniels	Television film; also producer
2010	Community	Meghan	Episode: "Aerodynamics of Gender"
2012	Project Runway	Herself	Episode: "It's Fashion Baby"
2013	Raising Hope	Rachel	Episode: "The Old Girl"
2013	Two and a Half Men	Stacey	Episode: "Cows, Prepare to Be Tipped"
2013	Dora the Explorer	Jessica the Ice Witch	Voice role; episode: "Dora's Ice Skating Spectacular"
2014	The Real Girl's Kitchen	Herself	3 episodes
2015–2021	Younger	Kelsey Peters	Main role
2016–2017	The Talk	Herself	3 episodes
2018	Who Do You Think You Are?	Herself	Episode dated: "June 4, 2018"
2022	The Bachelor	Herself	Season 26; episode: "Week 2"
2022	My Best Friend's Kitchen with Gaby Dalkin	Herself	Episode: "Traditional Thanksgiving"
2022–2023	How I Met Your Father	Sophie Tompkins	Lead role; also producer
TBA	Pretty Ugly	Miranda Miller	Lead role; also executive producer

=== Web series ===
Year	Title	Role	Notes
2009	The Chase	Various	7 episodes; to promote her clothing line Femme for DKNY
2016	"What Last Minute Christmas Shopping Is Really Like (ft. Hilary Duff)"	Herself	Skit with Canadian YouTuber Lilly Singh
2018	Staying Fresh with Hilary Duff	Herself	4 episodes; made in collaboration with Walmart and Tastemade to educate viewers on grocery shopping tips
2020	Lady Parts	Herself	Episode: "How to Survive Puberty"

== Discography ==
- Santa Claus Lane (2002)
- Metamorphosis (2003)
- Hilary Duff (2004)
- Dignity (2007)
- Breathe In. Breathe Out. (2015)
- Luck... or Something (2026)

== Tours ==
- Metamorphosis Tour (2003–2004)
- Most Wanted Tour (2004–2005)
- Still Most Wanted Tour (2005–2006)
- Dignity Tour (2007–2008)
- Small Rooms, Big Nerves (2026)
- The Lucky Me Tour (2026–2027)

== Written works ==
- Elixir trilogy
  - Elixir (2010)
  - Devoted (2011)
  - True (2013)
- Other published works
  - My Little Brave Girl (2021)
  - My Little Sweet Boy (2023)

== Achievements ==
In March 2025, Billboard ranked Duff at No. 73 on its "Top 100 Women Artists of the 21st Century" list. Among her various accolades, Duff has received seven Nickelodeon Kids' Choice Awards, four Teen Choice Awards, and two Young Artist Awards. She has been nominated for two People's Choice Awards and an MTV Video Music Award. In 2026, Duff achieved her first No. 1 album in Australia with Luck… Or Something, marking the first chart-topping release of her career in the country and her first album in over a decade.
