= True, West Virginia =

- Unincorporated community
- Location within West Virginia Location within the United States
- Coordinates: 37°34′50″N 80°56′10″W
- Country: United States
- State: West Virginia
- County: Summers
- Elevation: 2,461 ft (750 m)
- Time zone: UTC-5 (Eastern (EST))
  - Summer (DST): UTC-4 (EDT)
- Area codes: 304 & 681
- GNIS feature ID: 1549960

True is an unincorporated community in Summers County, West Virginia, United States. True is located near West Virginia Route 20, south of Hinton.

== History ==
According to tradition, the name True is derived from the petition for a community post office, which concluded with the line "Now this is true". Another version is that the name was randomly selected by postal officials.
