= Charles Kittredge True =

American historian

Charles Kittredge True (August 14, 1809 – June 20, 1878) was a United States Methodist Episcopal clergyman, educator, and author.

== Biography ==
He was born in Portland, Maine. He graduated at Harvard in 1832, and was subsequently pastor of several Methodist churches. He entered the New England Conference, 1833; was agent of the New England Education Society, 1834; principal of Amenia Seminary, 1835; entered the New York Conference, 1836; was transferred to the New England Conference, 1838. In 1849 he received the degree of D.D. from Harvard. He served as professor of intellectual and moral science in Wesleyan University (1849–61), and financial agent of Wesleyan (1870–73). He died in Brooklyn, New York.

== Works ==
- The Elements of Logic (1840)
- Shawmut; or, the Settlement of Boston by the Puritan Pilgrims (1845)
- John Winthrop and the Great Colony (1875)
- The Life and Times of Sir Walter Raleigh (1877)
- The Life and Times of John Knox (1878)
- Memoirs of John Howard (1878)
- The Thirty Years' War (1878)
- Heroes of Holland (1882)
- Life of Captain John Smith (1882)

He edited the Oregonian and Indian Advocate in 1839 in Boston, Massachusetts.

== Family ==
He married Elizabeth Bassett Hyde. They were the parents of agricultural educationist Alfred Charles True and zoologist Frederick William True.
