= True North (2007 book) =

2007 book by Bill George and Peter Sims

- Author: Bill George; Peter Sims
- Genre: Business
- Publisher: Jossey-Bass
- Publication date: 2007
- ISBN: 978-0787987510

True North: Discover Your Authentic Leadership, by Bill George and Peter Sims, is a best-selling 2007 business book and follow-up to George's 2003 Authentic Leadership. The book—based on interviews between George (a Harvard Business School professor) and over 125 leaders including David Gergen, Starbucks CEO Howard Schultz, and Sir Adrian Cadbury—discusses the qualities and effectiveness of "authentic leadership" and its viability in the business and political worlds.

The book features a foreword by David Gergen discussing the leadership styles of Richard Nixon, Gerald Ford, Ronald Reagan and Bill Clinton.

True North is part of the Warren Bennis series of business books, and is published by Jossey-Bass, an imprint of Wiley publishing.

== See also ==
- Authentic leadership
- Course (navigation)
- Peak experience
- Positive psychology

== Sources ==
- George, Bill; Sims, Peter (2007). True North: Discover Your Authentic Leadership. Jossey-Bass. ISBN 9781119082941.
- George, Bill (2015-08-10). Discover Your True North. John Wiley & Sons. ISBN 978-1-119-08294-1.
- George, Bill; Clayton, Zach (2022-08-30). True North, Emerging Leader Edition. John Wiley & Sons. ISBN 978-1-119-88610-5.
