= Frederick W. True =

American biologist

Frederick William True
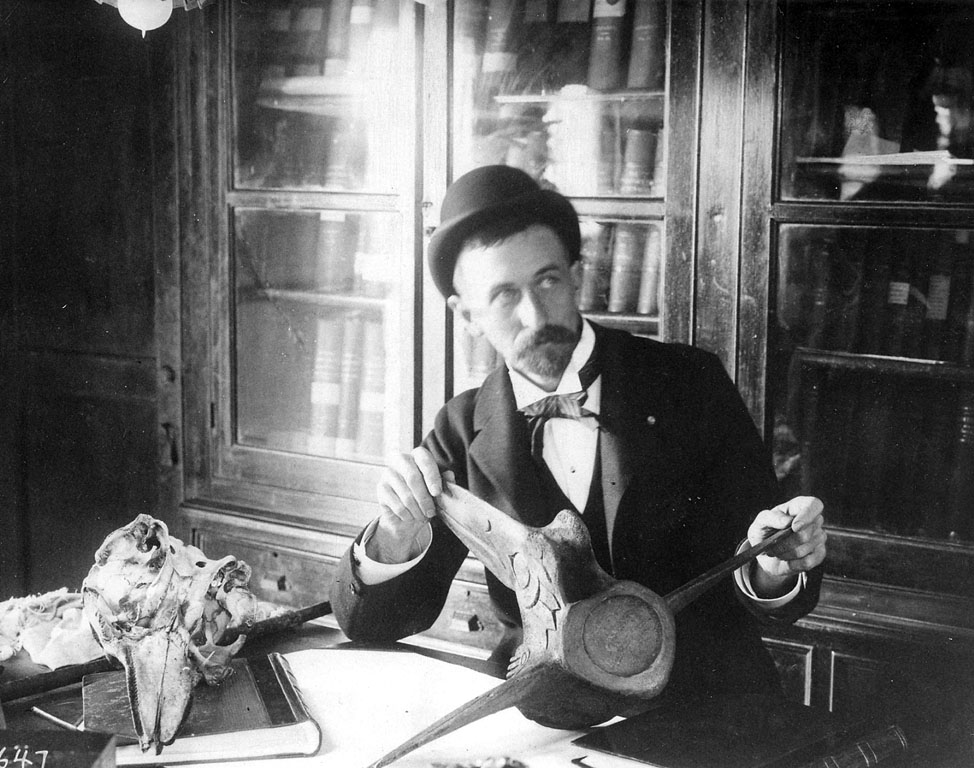
- Born: July 8, 1858; Middletown, Connecticut
- Died: June 25, 1914 (aged 55)
- Known for: True's beaked whale
- Scientific career
- Fields: Biology
- Workplaces: United States National Museum
- Author abbrev. (zoology): True

Frederick William True (July 8, 1858 – June 25, 1914) was an American biologist, the first head curator of biology (1897–1911) at the United States National Museum, now part of the Smithsonian Institution.

== Biography ==
He was born in Middletown, Connecticut in 1858. He received a B.S. from the University of New York in 1878, when he entered the U.S. government service. He was expert special agent on fisheries for the 10th census, 1879. In 1881, True started working for the U.S. National Museum as a clerk. That year he became librarian and acting curator of mammals, which positions he filled until 1883. True was curator of mammals at the U.S. National Museum (1883-1909), curator of comparative anatomy (1885-1890), executive curator (1894-1897), head curator of biology (1897-1911) and assistant secretary in charge of the library and international exchange service (1911-1914). He was appointed to the board of the American Philosophical Society, of which he was already a member, on March 2, 1900.

He started his career studying invertebrates, but his poor eyesight obligated him to give up studies with the microscope, and he turned to studies of cetaceans and their relatives. True's beaked whale, True's vole and True's shrew mole were named by him, and have vernacular names in his honor.

== Works ==
- "Note on the occurrence of an armadillo of the genus Xenurus in Honduras"
- Review of the Family of Delphinidae
- Whalebone Whales of the Western North Atlantic (1904)
- Observations on Living White Whales (1911)

== Family ==
He married Louis Elvina Prentiss in 1887, and at his death two of their children were living. He was the son of Methodist clergyman and writer Charles Kittredge True. His brother Alfred Charles True was a noted agricultural educationist.
