= Bill George (businessman) =

American businessman and academic (born 1951)

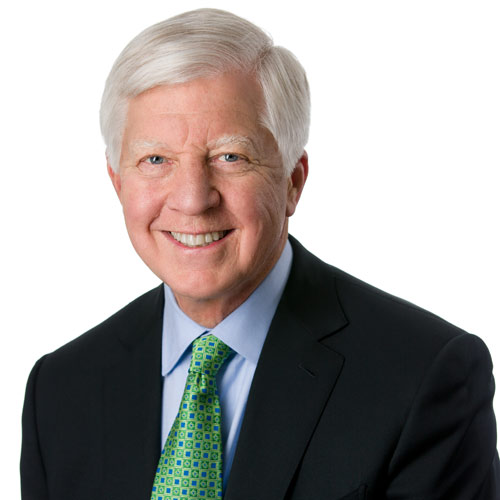
- George in 2015
- Born: September 14, 1942 (age 83); Muskegon, Michigan, U.S.
- Education: Georgia Institute of Technology (BS); Harvard University (MBA)

William W. George is an American businessman and academic. He is a professor of management practice, and a Henry B. Arthur Fellow of Ethics at Harvard Business School. He previously served as chairman and chief executive officer of Medtronic.

== Early life and education ==
George graduated with a Bachelor in Industrial and Systems Engineering with high honors from the Georgia Institute of Technology in 1964. At Georgia Tech, George was a member of the Beta Psi chapter of the fraternity Sigma Chi. He received a Master of Business Administration with high distinction from Harvard University in 1966; where he was a Baker Scholar.

== Career ==
He started his career in the United States Department of Defense where he was Assistant to the Assistant Secretary of Defense (Comptroller) and later as Special Civilian Assistant to the Secretary of the Navy. He later served as president of Litton Microwave Cooking Products from 1969-1978 and as Executive Vice President of Honeywell and also President of Honeywell Europe. In 1989, he joined Medtronic as president and chief operating officer. He was elected chief executive officer in 1991 and chairman of the board in 1996.

He was a professor at the Harvard Business School in Boston from 2004 to 2016 and is currently a senior fellow.

In 2002–2003 he was a professor at the International Institute for Management Development and the École Polytechnique Fédérale de Lausanne in Switzerland. He also served as executive-in-residence at the Yale School of Management.

He served on the boards of directors of Target Corporation, Novartis, ExxonMobil, Mayo Clinic and Goldman Sachs. He currently serves on the advisory council for CFK Africa.

== Awards and memberships ==
In 2014, he was awarded the Bower Award for Business Leadership by the Franklin Institute. He was elected a member of the National Academy of Engineering in 2012 for applying engineering principles to manufacturing to advance health care.

He sits on the executive committee of the board of YMCA of the North and the Guthrie Theater. He has served as chair of the board of Allina Health System, Abbott Northwestern Hospital, United Way of the Greater Twin Cities, and AdvaMed. Previously, he served on the board of Carnegie Endowment for International Peace, the World Economic Forum USA.

He has received honorary degrees from the Mayo Clinic, Georgia Tech, University of St. Thomas, Augsburg College, and Bryant University.

He has been named one of "Top 25 Business Leaders of the Past 25 Years" by PBS; "Executive of the Year—2001" by the Academy of Management; and "Director of the Year—2001–2002" by the National Association of Corporate Directors. In 2018, Bill George received the Larry Foster Award for Integrity in Public Communication at the second annual Arthur W. Page Center Awards in New York City.

== Management Style ==
As CEO, Bill George championed a management style focused on authenticity and well-being. He defined 5 dimensions to shape this management namely purpose, values, heart, relationships and self-discipline.

== Publications ==
- Authentic Leadership: Rediscovering the Secrets to Creating Lasting Value, ISBN 978-0-7879-6913-4, 2003.
- True North: Discover Your Authentic Leadership, ISBN 978-0-7879-8751-0, with Peter Sims, 2007.
- True North Groups: A Powerful Path to Personal and Leadership Development, ISBN 978-1-60994-007-2, with Doug Baker, 2008.
- Finding Your True North: A Personal Guide, ISBN 978-0-470-26136-1, with Andrew McLean and Nick Craig, 2008.
- 7 Lessons for Leading in Crisis, ISBN 978-0-470-53187-7, 2009.
- Discover Your True North, ISBN 978-1-119-08294-1, 2015.
- The Discover Your True North Fieldbook: A Personal Guide to Becoming an Authentic Leader, ISBN 978-1-119-10355-4, with Nick Craig and Scott Snook, 2015.
- Clayton, Zach; George, Bill (August 30, 2022). True North: Leading Authentically in Today's Workplace, Emerging Leader Edition. John Wiley & Sons. ISBN 978-1119886105.
- George, Bill; Schwenk, Lauren; Hall, Josh (November 2022). True North Fieldbook, Emerging Leader Edition: The Emerging Leader's Guide to Leading Authentically in Today's Workplace. John Wiley & Sons. ISBN 978-1-119-88627-3.
