= True (TrinityRoots album) =

Studio album by TrinityRoots
- Released: 2001

TrinityRoots chronology
TrinityRoots (2001)	True (2001)	Home, Land and Sea (2004)

True is the debut album by New Zealand band TrinityRoots, released in 2001. The album peaked at number 21 in New Zealand.

== Track listing ==
1. "True"
2. "Sense and Cents"
3. "Beautiful People"
4. "Call to You"
5. "Passion"
6. "D By D"
7. "Egos"
8. "Just Like You"
9. "Little Things"

== Charts ==
Chart (2002)	Peak position
New Zealand Albums (RMNZ)	28
