= Devoted =

2011 novel by Hilary Duff

- The front cover
- Author: Hilary Duff; Elise Allen
- Language: English
- Genre: Young adult fiction
- Publisher: Simon & Schuster
- Publication date: October 11, 2011
- Publication place: United States
- Media type: Print (Hardcover), Digital (E-Book)
- Pages: 368
- ISBN: 1-4424-0855-3
- Preceded by: Elixir (2010)
- Followed by: True (2013)

Devoted is the sequel to New York Times-bestselling novel Elixir by American entertainer Hilary Duff with Elise Allen. It was published and released to booksellers on October 11, 2011. It is the second in an unnamed trilogy by Duff and Allen.

After the release of Elixir in 2010, Duff stated that she intended to write more in the series. She said, however, that nothing had been put down as yet and that she and her co-writer, Allen, were simply playing around with different ideas. On October 18, 2010, Duff announced on Twitter that she had begun work on the sequel. Devoted was released on October 11, 2011.

In an interview with MTV, Duff stated that "Devoted picks up basically where Elixir left off, and Clea has a lot of big questions to answer and decisions to make." She also said that plans for the third and final book in the trilogy were being discussed and that "I don't think it will be as long. It will be a wrap-up, kind of where they are now and what exactly happened to the Elixir, whose hands it's in, what ends up happening with Sage."

== Plot ==
After Sage was kidnapped by the Saviors, Clea is fruitlessly searching for him. In the woods outside her house, a family of ghostly apparitions appears and gives her information on his whereabouts.

Clea and her friend Ben track down a hideout of Cursed Vengeance, the group that has been cursed until Sage's death, in an abandoned subway station. They come to a tenuous agreement to help each other find Sage, but after that they will be at odds again.

Through a series of flashbacks, it is revealed that the ghostly family all consumed the Elixir of Life over 2,000 years ago and have been living in immortality ever since. They've trained their minds to gain psychic powers such as telekinesis and astral projection, but the Elixir is running out and soon they'll be left in a comatose state. To prevent this, they are helping the Saviors to kill Sage and turn his blood into more Elixir. The youngest daughter, Amelia, is unsure of this path and decides she wants to help Clea save Sage.

Meanwhile, Sage is being held captive by the Saviors and they perform a ritual to break the bond between his soul and Clea's. At the next full moon, they will kill him with a magical dagger and his blood will become more Elixir that others can drink.

Amelia sends a psychic warning to Clea, letting her know where the ritual will be performed on Sage. She warns Cursed Vengeance, who gathers up a small army and leads an attack on the Saviors compound. Amelia uses her psychic powers to fight her family, seemingly killing all of them in the process.

Clea reaches Sage just in time to witness his throat being cut and his blood turning to Elixir in a bowl. In her anguish, she knocks the bowl over, letting the Elixir soak into the ground so no one can have it. The remaining Saviors leave, dejected.

The book ends with the reveal that Sage's soul entered the body of a man killed during the fighting.

== Release ==
Devoted was released in trade paperback on November 6, 2012.

Duff announced in July 2012 that the sequel and final novel in the Elixir series would be titled True and was released on April 16, 2013, by Simon & Schuster.
