= The True North (TV series) =

Canadian documentary television miniseries

- Written by: Ben Maartman; William Whitehead; Doug Wilkinson
- Narrated by: Peter Elkington
- Composer: Ricky Hyslop
- Country of origin: Canada
- Original language: English
- No. of seasons: 1
- No. of episodes: 11

Production
- Executive producer: Jim Guthro
- Producers: Doug Gillingham; Doug Wilkinson
- Running time: 30 minutes

Original release
- Network: CBC Television
- Release: 14 September – 23 November 1967

The True North is a Canadian documentary television miniseries which aired on CBC Television in 1967.

== Premise ==
The series featured documentaries concerning the Canadian Arctic with its environment and inhabitants. It was developed as a Canadian Centennial project.

== Scheduling ==
This half-hour series was broadcast on Thursdays at 10:30 p.m. (Eastern) from 14 September to 23 November 1967.

== Episodes ==
No.	Title	Original release date
1	"Land Before Time"	14 September 1967
Dramatic portrayal of aboriginal creation legends by M. Charles Cohen, directed by Jim Guthro.
2	"The Eskimos of Old"	21 September 1967
A look at Inuit life in the 1930s on location at Pelly Bay, Northwest Territories
3	TBA	28 September 1967
4	"Animals Without Number"	5 October 1967
Describes the Inuit expertise of northern animals.
5	"Skin For Skin"	12 October 1967
History of the Hudson's Bay Company in Northern Canada
6	"The Eskimo Today"	19 October 1967
Describes the disruptive cultural effects of modern technology on the life of the Inuit
7	TBA	26 October 1967
Feature on the Northwest Territories
8	TBA	2 November 1967
9	TBA	9 November 1967
Features women who discuss life in the Yukon after moving there from Europe
10	TBA	16 November 1967
How new technologies support industry and mining in the North
11	TBA	23 November 1967
A report on the National Northern Development Conference
