= Stuff by Hilary Duff =

Lifestyle brand by Hilary Duff

- Stuff by Hilary Duff logo
- Type: Private
- Industry: Cosmetics; Fashion
- Founded: 2003
- Defunct: 2009
- Area served: United States; Canada; Australia; New Zealand
- Key people: Hilary Duff (CEO and head designer); Geoffry Gertz (creative director)

Stuff by Hilary Duff (Note: Also known as Stuff by Duff and sometimes stylized in all lowercase.) was a lifestyle brand that was launched by American singer and actress Hilary Duff in February 2004.

== History ==
=== 2003–2005 ===
On April 4, 2003, it was announced that Bravado International, the company that owned Duff's worldwide licensing rights, had signed a deal with Townley Cosmetics to launch a cosmetics brand called Stuff by Hilary Duff. The line, which was targeted at tween and teen girls, was to include lip, nail, eye and body products and retail for less than $4 USD an item. According to Abie Safdieh, the CEO of Townley Cosmetics, the singer and actress was not just the face of the brand; Duff had input in the packaging and colors and insisted that the packaging, which was a metallic pink and featured a logo that she created, be completely recyclable. The majority of the products were "in the pink family", but included a "range for all complexions and tastes". The cosmetics line, which was initially expected to launch in the fall of 2003, was also revealed to be part of a "larger licensing campaign" that consists of apparel, accessories, bedding and footwear. Further licenses, such as with NTD Apparel for fashion apparel and sportswear and Kidstreet for bags, backpacks and accessories, were revealed on June 14, 2003. Bravado and NTD Apparel hosted a special press preview and fashion show at the Licensing International expo later that same month to officially introduce the Stuff by Hilary Duff apparel line. Henry Stupp, the executive vice president of NTD Apparel, noted that the singer and actress had "a lot of say on colors, materials and styles" for the collection.

On December 18, 2003, it was revealed that Target had signed an exclusive U.S. licensing deal with Bravado to bring the Stuff by Hilary Duff line to its stores. They also signed deals with Zellers in Canada and Kmart in Australia to carry the lifestyle brand. Beauty items, such as cosmetics and hair care, launched in the United States in late February 2004, while the rest of the products, which included apparel, footwear, jewelry and eyewear, launched later that spring. In Canada, the brand was launched at The Carlu in Toronto on March 12. It was launched in Australia and New Zealand in August.

In October 2005, Duff became the chief executive officer (CEO) and head designer of her fashion and lifestyle company, HD International. Later that same month, Duff's mother Susan was sued by NTD Apparel for breach of contract. The multimillion dollar lawsuit claimed that Susan's entertainment company, Rafter H, was acting in violation of an "exclusive merchandising agreement" with Stuff by Hilary Duff by signing deals with other retailers. Rafter H revealed that they were planning to file their own lawsuit against NTD Apparel for "producing low-quality goods".

=== 2006–2008 ===
On April 5, 2007, it was announced that Duff had partnered with the McCall Pattern Company to create a line of fashion sewing crafts and patterns for girls sized 3-16. The patterns, which were based on the spring 2007 Stuff by Hilary Duff line, were released in Canada in late March. Each product, which retailed for about $12 CAN, contained instructions for three or four pieces, including hoodies, pants, skirts and tops. Later that same month, it was announced that Duff had teamed up with Motive Eyewear to launch a new line of eyewear under the Stuff by Hilary Duff label.

On August 8, 2007, it was announced that Duff had partnered with Michaels to create a line of fashion crafts under the Stuff by Hilary Duff label. The "Design It Yourself" line featured 40,000 products, including fashion accessories and embellishments (such as chain link bracelets and necklaces and vintage-inspired charms) that were designed to "inspire customers to reinvent existing products or clothing". Duff used the brand's sportswear collection as a starting point, choosing her "favorite trims, details and graphics for charms, patches and iron-on transfer". The crafts were available in more than 900 Michaels stores in North America, starting on August 26.

=== 2009 ===
In a February 2009 article by Women's Wear Daily, it was revealed that the Stuff by Hilary Duff line was being "phased out" and that the only product still available on the market was eyewear. According to Duff, she lost interest in the brand and was ready to "move on and do other things".
