= Arthur L. True =

American politician

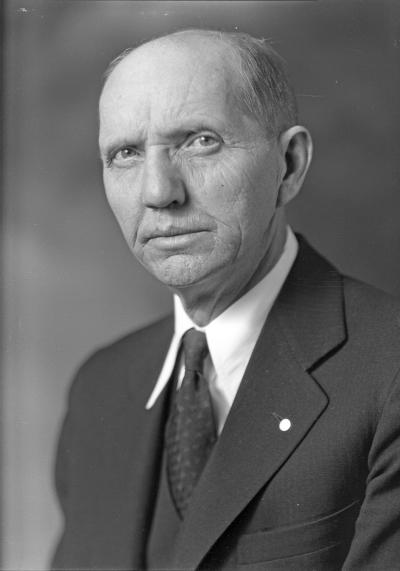
- True in 1931

Member of the Washington House of Representatives for the 2nd district
- In office 1919–1927

Member of the Washington State Senate for the 3rd district
- In office 1929–1933

Personal details
- Born: May 14, 1874 Pennsylvania, United States
- Died: May 27, 1952 (aged 78) Spokane, Washington, United States
- Party: Republican

Arthur Leander True (May 14, 1874 – May 27, 1952) was an American politician in the state of Washington. He served in the Washington House of Representatives and Washington State Senate.
