= Alfred Charles True =

American educator (1853–1929)

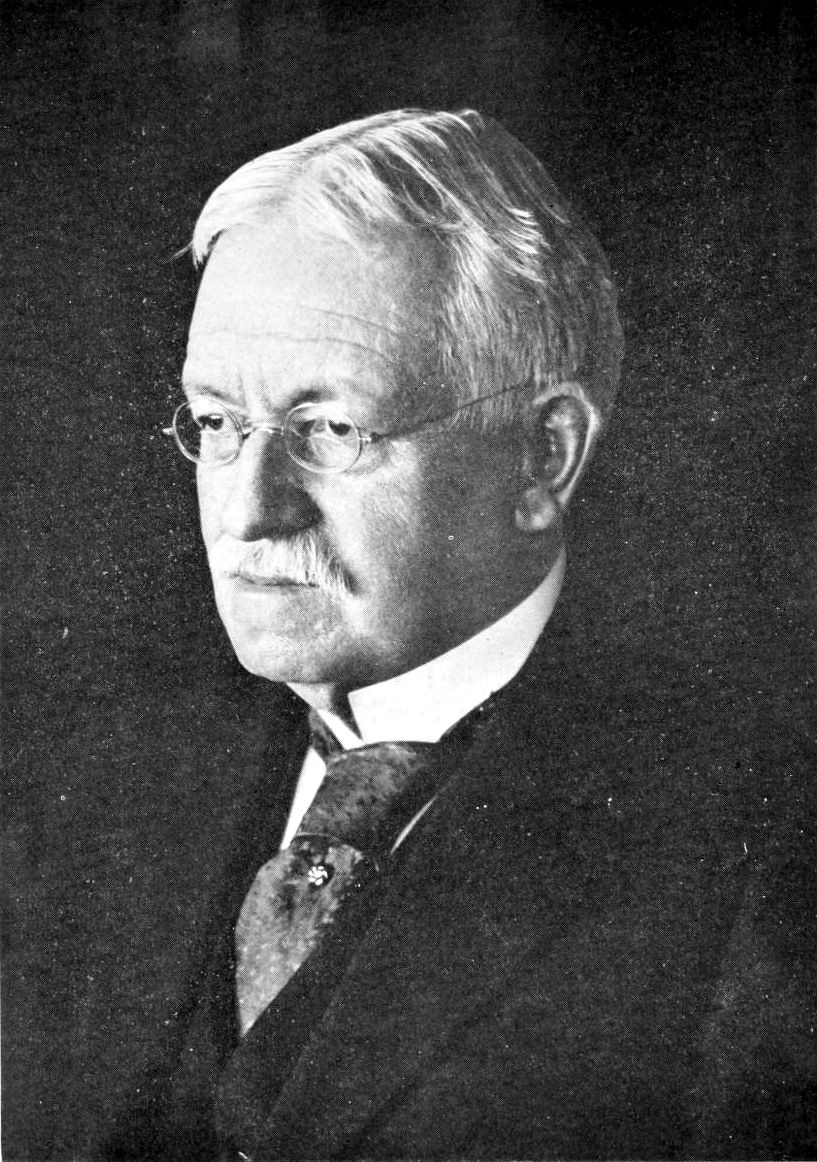
- Born: June 5, 1853; Middletown, Connecticut, U.S.
- Died: April 23, 1929 (aged 75); Washington, D.C., U.S.
- Education: Wesleyan University (Sc.D. Harvard University
- Occupations: Educator; agriculturist; journalist
- Spouse: Emma Fortune (m. 1875)
- Children: 2
- Father: Charles Kittredge True

Alfred Charles True (June 5, 1853 - April 23, 1929) was a United States educator and agriculturist.

== Biography ==
A son of Charles Kittredge True, he was born at Middletown, Connecticut. He graduated from Wesleyan University in 1873, from which he also received his Sc.D. He was a teacher at Westfield normal school in Westfield, Massachusetts, for several years, did graduate studies at Harvard in 1882-84, and served as an instructor at Wesleyan in 1884-88.

At Wesleyan, he got to know Wilbur O. Atwater, who in 1888 founded the Office of Experiment Stations at the United States Department of Agriculture (USDA). True went to work for the USDA in 1889, and from 1893 to 1915, he was director of the Office of Experiment Stations. In 1915, he became director of the States Relations Service, which the Office of Experiment Stations had become part of. He served in this role until 1923.

True had charge of investigations in irrigation, drainage and human nutrition, and supervised the federal work and expenditures for agricultural experiment stations in all the states and in Alaska and Hawaii (both territories at that time) and Puerto Rico and Guam. He also supervised federal work and expenditures for co-operative extension work in agriculture and home economics throughout the United States under the Smith-Lever Act of 8 May 1914, together with investigations in home economics and agricultural education.

In 1902 he was dean of the first graduate school of agriculture in the United States, held at the Ohio State University, and in 1914 he was president of the Association of American Agricultural Colleges and Experiment Stations.

The SS Alfred C. True, a Liberty Ship built in World War II, was named for him.

In 1875, he married Emma Fortune. They had two children.

== Selected publications ==
True particularly studied the organization and management of institutions for agricultural education and research, and published several monographs on this subject, chiefly in the bulletins of the Office of Experiment Stations, including:

- Education and Research in Agriculture in the United States (1894)
- Agricultural Experiment Stations: Their Objects and Work (1895)
- The Agricultural Experiment Stations in the United States (with V. A. Clark, 1900)
- Agricultural Experiment Stations in Foreign Countries (with D. J. Crosby, 1902)
- Progress in Agricultural Education (1902)

Beginning 1923, he devoted himself mostly to the production of three monographs:

- A History of Agricultural Extension Work in the United States, 1785-1923 (1928)/(1937)
- A History of Agricultural Education in the United States, 1785-1925 (1929)
- A History of Agricultural Experimentation and Research in the United States (1929)
- A History of Agricultural Experimentation and Research in the United States, 1607-1925: Including a History of the United States Department of Agriculture (1937)

For ten years he was chief editor of the Experiment Station Record and the Experiment Station Work. He contributed articles on agriculture and horticulture to The New International Encyclopædia and Webster's International Dictionary.
