= Zedd discography =

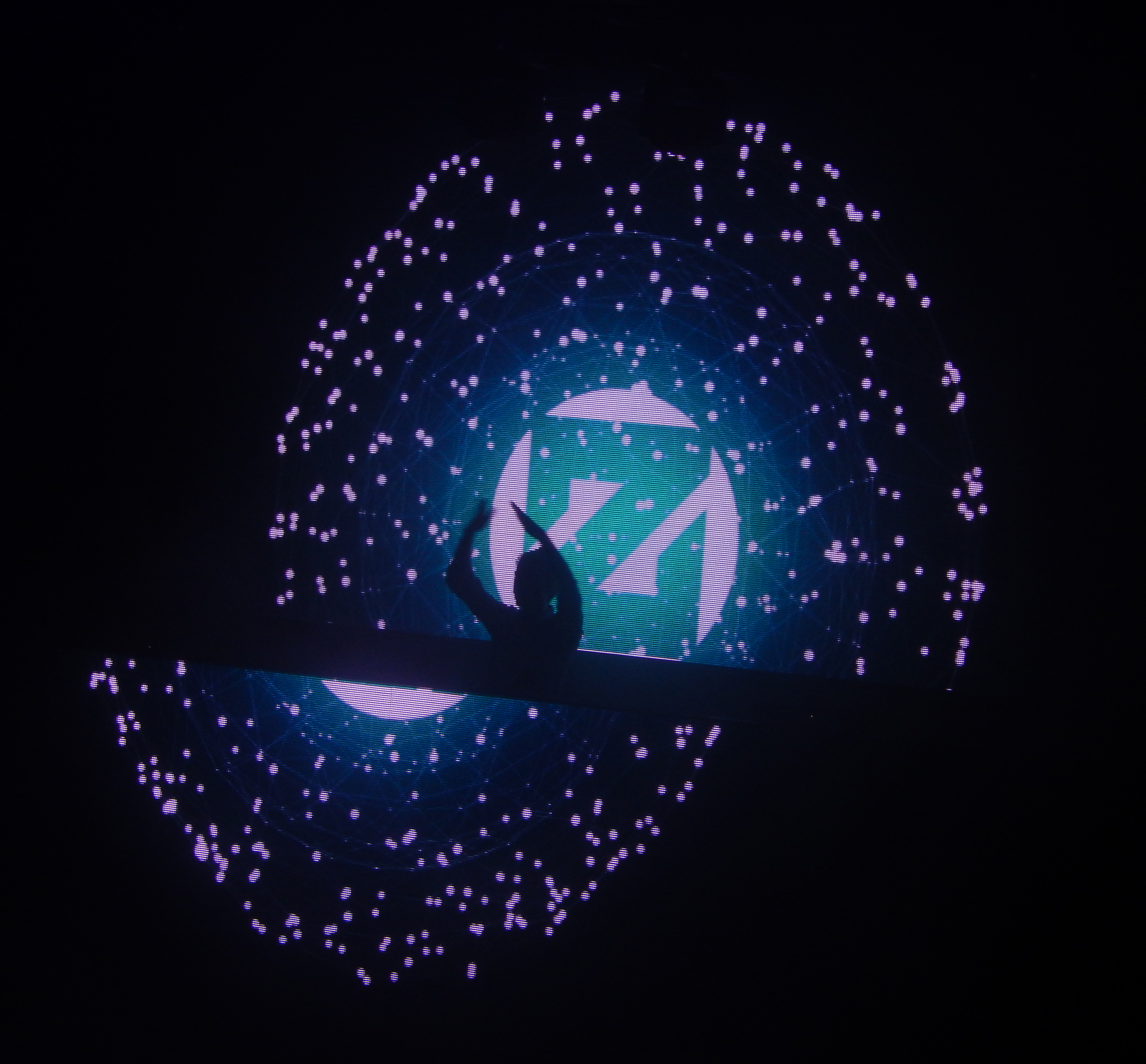
- Zedd performing at the Aragon Ballroom, Chicago
- Studio albums: 3
- EPs: 3
- Compilation albums: 1
- Singles: 38
- Music videos: 13
- Remixes: 30

German DJ Zedd has released three studio albums, one compilation album, 13 music videos, three extended plays, 38 singles (including two as a featured artist) and 30 remixes.

== Albums ==
=== Studio albums ===
List of studio albums, with selected chart positions
Title	Album details	Peak chart positions									Sales	Certifications
Title	Album details	GER	AUS	CAN	JPN	SWE	UK	UK Dance	US	US Dance	Sales	Certifications
Clarity	Released: 5 October 2012; Label: Interscope; Formats: CD, LP, digital download	—	—	—	77	30	104	8	32	2	US: 208,000	MC: Platinum; RIAA: Platinum
True Colors	Released: 18 May 2015; Label: Interscope; Formats: CD, LP, digital download	50	19	6	13	14	42	4	4	1		MC: Gold; RIAA: Gold
Telos	Released: 30 August 2024; Label: Interscope; Formats: CD, LP, digital download	—	—	—	—	—	—	14	—	8		
"—" denotes a recording that did not chart or was not released in that territory.

=== Compilation album ===
Compilation album, with chart position
Title	Album details	Peak
Title	Album details	JPN
Stay +	Released: 27 December 2017 (Japan only); Label: Universal Music Japan; Formats: CD, digital download	23

== Extended plays ==
List of extended plays
Title	Details
Autonomy	Released: 28 March 2011; Label: Bugeyed; Format: Digital download
Shave It – The Aftershave	Released: 8 November 2011; Label: Owsla; Format: Digital download
Spectrum	Released: 31 July 2012; Label: Interscope; Format: Digital download

== Singles ==
=== As lead artist ===
List of singles as lead artist, with selected chart positions and certifications, showing year released and album name
Title	Year	Peak chart positions										Certifications	Album
Title	Year	GER	AUS	AUT	CAN	IRE	JPN	NZ	SWE	UK	US	Certifications	Album
"The Anthem"	2010	—	—	—	—	—	—	—	—	—	—		Non-album singles
"Autonomy"	2011	—	—	—	—	—	—	—	—	—	—		Non-album singles
"The Legend of Zelda"	2011	—	—	—	—	—	—	—	—	—	—		Non-album singles
"Dovregubben"	2011	—	—	—	—	—	—	—	—	—	—		Non-album singles
"Scorpion Move"	2011	—	—	—	—	—	—	—	—	—	—		Non-album singles
"Shave It" (Note: An alternate version titled "Shave It Up" was included on Clarity.)	2011	—	—	—	—	—	—	—	—	—	—		Clarity
"Stars Come Out" (featuring Heather Bright)	2011	—	—	—	—	—	—	—	—	—	—		Non-album singles
"Slam the Door"	2012	—	—	—	—	—	—	—	—	—	—		Non-album singles
"Shotgun"	2012	—	—	—	—	—	—	—	—	—	—		Non-album singles
"Human" (with Nicky Romero)	2012	—	—	—	—	—	—	—	—	—	—		Spectrum EP
"Spectrum" (featuring Matthew Koma)	2012	80	—	30	—	—	4	—	—	—	— (Note: "Spectrum" did not enter the Billboard Hot 100, but peaked at number five on the Bubbling Under Hot 100 Singles chart.)	ARIA: Gold; RIAA: Platinum	Clarity
"Clarity" (featuring Foxes)	2012	94	13	—	17	39	—	13	—	27	8	BVMI: Gold; ARIA: 6× Platinum; BPI: Platinum; GLF: Platinum; MC: Platinum; RIAA: 7× Platinum; RMNZ: 3× Platinum	Clarity
"Stay the Night" (featuring Hayley Williams)	2013	15	11	12	20	8	—	20	47	2	18	BVMI: Gold; ARIA: 3× Platinum; BPI: Platinum; GLF: Platinum; IFPI AUT: Gold; RIAA: 2× Platinum; RMNZ: Platinum	Clarity
"Push Play" (featuring Miriam Bryant)	2013	—	—	—	—	—	—	—	—	—	—		Clarity
"Find You" (featuring Matthew Koma and Miriam Bryant)	2014	—	68	—	—	—	—	—	—	—	— (Note: "Find You" did not enter the Billboard Hot 100, but peaked at number one on the Bubbling Under Hot 100 Singles chart.)	ARIA: Gold; GLF: Gold; RIAA: Gold	Divergent
"I Want You to Know" (featuring Selena Gomez)	2015	39	22	36	19	23	21	—	23	14	17	BVMI: Gold; ARIA: 2× Platinum; BPI: Silver; GLF: Platinum; RIAA: 2× Platinum; RMNZ: Gold	True Colors
"Beautiful Now" (featuring Jon Bellion)	2015	—	—	—	61	—	55	—	— (Note: "Beautiful Now" did not enter the Swedish Singles Chart, but peaked at number seven on the Swedish Heatseeker chart.)	—	64	ARIA: Platinum; RIAA: 2× Platinum; RIAJ: Gold (digital); RIAJ: Gold (streaming); RMNZ: Gold	True Colors
"Papercut" (featuring Troye Sivan)	2015	—	93	—	—	—	—	—	—	—	—		True Colors
"Candyman" (with Aloe Blacc)	2016	—	—	—	—	—	—	— (Note: "Candyman" did not enter the NZ Top 40 Singles Chart, but peaked at number 9 on the NZ Heatseekers chart.)	—	—	— (Note: "Candyman" did not enter the Billboard Hot 100, but peaked at number 18 on the Bubbling Under Hot 100 Singles chart.)	RIAA: Gold; RMNZ: Gold	Stay +
"True Colors" (with Kesha) (Note: The Tim James version of "True Colors" is included on the album True Colors; the version with Kesha was released separately.)	2016	—	76	—	66	81	—	—	—	78	74		True Colors
"Adrenaline" (with Grey)	2016	—	—	—	—	—	—	—	—	—	—		Stay +
"Ignite"	2016	—	—	—	—	—	—	—	—	—	—		Stay +
"Stay" (with Alessia Cara)	2017	13	3	6	9	8	35	9	9	8	7	BVMI: Platinum; ARIA: 7× Platinum; BPI: 2× Platinum; GLF: 2× Platinum; IFPI AUT: Gold; MC: 8× Platinum; RIAA: 6× Platinum; RIAJ: Gold (digital); RIAJ: Platinum (streaming); RMNZ: 4× Platinum	Everything, Everything (Original Motion Picture Soundtrack) and Stay +
"Get Low" (with Liam Payne)	2017	75	39	54	50	37	64	— (Note: "Get Low" did not enter the NZ Top 40 Singles Chart, but peaked at number two on the NZ Heatseekers Singles Chart.)	43	26	91	ARIA: Platinum; BPI: Silver; MC: Platinum; RIAA: Gold; RMNZ: Gold	LP1 and Stay +
"The Middle" (with Maren Morris and Grey)	2018	15	7	12	6	7	50	8	19	7	5	BVMI: Gold; ARIA: 10× Platinum; BPI: 2× Platinum; GLF: Gold; IFPI AUT: Platinum; MC: 9× Platinum; RIAA: 6× Platinum; RIAJ: Gold (streaming); RMNZ: 5× Platinum	Non-album single
"Stay" (2018 re-release; with Riri)	2018	—	—	—	—	—	—	—	—	—	—		Neo
"Happy Now" (with Elley Duhé)	2018	64	27	64	53	24	58	39	64	45	90	ARIA: 3× Platinum; BPI: Silver; IFPI AUT: Gold; MC: 2× Platinum; RIAA: Platinum; RMNZ: Platinum	Non-album single
"Lost in Japan" (Note: "Lost In Japan (Remix)" only appears as a CD deluxe edition bonus track on Shawn Mendes.) (remix with Shawn Mendes)	2018	—	—	—	22	—	—	—	94	—	48		Shawn Mendes
"365" (with Katy Perry)	2019	72	38	70	52	33	52	— (Note: "365" did not enter the NZ Top 40 Singles Chart, but peaked at number three on the NZ Hot Singles Chart.)	60	37	86	ARIA: Platinum; BPI: Silver; MC: Platinum; RMNZ: Gold	Non-album singles
"Good Thing" (with Kehlani)	2019	—	58	—	91	61	—	— (Note: "Good Thing" did not enter the NZ Top 40 Singles Chart, but peaked at number eight on the NZ Hot Singles Chart.)	—	92	— (Note: "Good Thing" did not enter the Billboard Hot 100, but peaked at number 23 on the Bubbling Under Hot 100 chart.)	ARIA: Platinum; RMNZ: Platinum	Non-album singles
"Funny" (with Jasmine Thompson)	2020	—	—	—	—	—	—	—	—	—	— (Note: "Funny" did not enter the Billboard Hot 100, but peaked at number 12 on the Bubbling Under Hot 100 Singles chart.)	RIAA: Gold	Non-album singles
"Inside Out" (with Griff)	2020	—	—	—	—	—	—	—	—	—	—		Non-album singles
"You've Got to Let Go If You Want to Be Free" (with Disclosure)	2022	—	—	—	—	—	—	— (Note: "You've Got to Let Go If You Want to Be Free" did not enter the NZ Top 40 Singles Chart, but peaked at number 17 on the NZ Hot Singles Chart.)	—	—	—		DEP11
"Follow" (with Martin Garrix)	2022	—	—	—	—	—	—	—	—	—	—		Sentio
"Make You Say" (with Maren Morris and Beauz)	2022	—	—	—	—	—	— (Note: "Make You Say" did not enter the Billboard Japan Hot 100 chart, but peaked at number 12 on the Billboard Japan Hot Overseas Songs chart.)	— (Note: "Make You Say" did not enter the NZ Top 40 Singles Chart, but peaked at number 25 on the NZ Hot Singles Chart.)	—	—	— (Note: "Make You Say" did not enter the Billboard Hot 100, but peaked at number 20 on the Bubbling Under Hot 100 Singles chart.)		Non-album single
"Out of Time" (featuring Bea Miller)	2024	—	—	—	—	—	—	—	—	—	—		Telos
"Lucky" (featuring Remi Wolf)	2024	—	—	—	—	—	— (Note: "Lucky" did not enter the Billboard Japan Hot 100 chart, but peaked at number 10 on the Billboard Japan Hot Overseas Songs chart.)	—	—	—	—		Telos
"Jaka Jaan" (featuring C&K)	2025	—	—	—	—	—	— (Note: "Jaka Jaan" did not enter the Billboard Japan Hot 100 chart, but peaked at number 39 on the Billboard Japan Download Songs chart.)	—	—	—	—		Non-album single
"Nakama" (featuring Ai)	2025	—	—	—	—	—	— (Note: "Nakama" did not enter the Billboard Japan Hot 100 chart, but peaked at number 82 on the Billboard Japan Download Songs chart.)	—	—	—	—		Non-album single
"—" denotes a recording that did not chart or was not released in that territory.

=== As featured artist ===
List of singles as featured artist, with selected chart positions and certifications, showing year released and album name
Title	Year	Peak chart positions										Certifications	Album
Title	Year	GER	AUS	AUT	CAN	IRE	JPN	NZ	SWE	UK	US	Certifications	Album
"Break Free" (Ariana Grande featuring Zedd)	2014	12	3	5	5	9	19	5	6	16	4	BVMI: Platinum; ARIA: 6× Platinum; BPI: 2× Platinum; GLF: 4× Platinum; IFPI AUT: Platinum; MC: 5× Platinum; RIAA: 5× Platinum; RIAJ: Platinum (digital); RIAJ: Platinum (streaming); RMNZ: 3× Platinum	My Everything
"Starving" (Hailee Steinfeld and Grey featuring Zedd)	2016	47	5	31	9	8	—	5	15	5	12	BVMI: Gold; ARIA: 2× Platinum; BPI: 2× Platinum; GLF: Platinum; IFPI AUT: Platinum; MC: 4× Platinum; RIAA: 4× Platinum; RMNZ: 5× Platinum	Haiz and Stay +
"—" denotes a recording that did not chart.

== Other charted songs ==
List of other charted songs, with selected chart positions, showing year released and album name
Title	Year	Peak chart positions	Album
Title	Year	US Dance	Album
"No Gravity" (featuring Bava)	2024	31	Telos

== Other appearances ==
List of other album appearances
Title	Year	Album
"Changes" (featuring Champions)	2011	Skrillex Presents Free Treats Volume: 001
"Codec"	2013	Now You See Me soundtrack
"Into the Lair"	2013	The Mortal Instruments: City of Bones soundtrack
"Boom Boom"	2018	Pitch Perfect 3
"One Strange Rock"	2018	One Strange Rock

=== Video games ===
Zedd has a total of 3 songs which appear in the Dance Dance Revolution (DDR) arcade series. One of these, "Break Free", was also present in Dance Rush.

Song	Arcade game				Availability	
Song	DR	A	A20	A20; Plus	Date added	Date removed
"Break Free" (Ariana Grande featuring Zedd)	Maybe	Yes	Yes	Maybe	7 July 2016 (DDR A); 16 March 2021 (DR )	16 March 2021 (DR ) 28 June 2021 (A20 Plus)
"I Want You to Know" (featuring Selena Gomez)		Yes	Yes	Maybe	7 July 2016	28 June 2021
"Clarity" (featuring Foxes)			Yes	Yes	24 July 2019	—N/a

== Production discography ==
Title	Year	Artist	Album
"I Don't Like You"	2012	Eva Simons	—N/a
"Beauty and a Beat"	2012	Justin Bieber	Believe
"Heaven"	2013	Namie Amuro	Feel
"G.U.Y."	2013	Lady Gaga	Artpop
"Aura"	2013	Lady Gaga	Artpop
"Donatella"	2013	Lady Gaga	Artpop
"Love's Just a Feeling" (featuring Rooty)	2016	Lindsey Stirling	Brave Enough
"Dangerous Night"	2018	Thirty Seconds to Mars	America
"Never Really Over"	2019	Katy Perry	Smile

== Remixes ==
Title	Year	Original artist(s)	Track
"No Regrets"	2010	Arbre Blass	SL Curtiz and Zedd Remix
"Witch Doktor"	2010	Armand Van Helden	
"Nothin' on You"	2010	B.o.B	
"This Year"	2010	Dan Thomas	
"Facebook Love"	2010	David May	Zedd Instrumental Remix; Zedd Remix
"Nasty"	2010	Erick Decks	Zedd Dub Remix; Zedd Vocal Remix
"Weapon of Choice"	2010	Fatboy Slim	
"I Feel Untouched"	2010	FLX	Zedd's Bigroom Remix
"Speedy P"	2010	Frowin Von Boyen	
"Ho's & Disco's"	2010	Lucky Date	
"Love Key 2010"	2010	Moussa Clarke	
"Icarus Lives!"	2010	Periphery	Zedd Remix
"Scary Monsters and Nice Sprites"	2010	Skrillex	
"Weekends!!!"	2010	Skrillex	
"Kid Yourself"	2010	SL Curtiz and Radio Jack	
"The Time (Dirty Bit)"	2010	The Black Eyed Peas	
"Latin Fever"	2010	Wolfgang Gartner	
"Ass on the Floor"	2011	Diddy – Dirty Money	
"Marry the Night"	2011	Lady Gaga	
"Born This Way"	2011	Lady Gaga	
"Save the World"	2011	Swedish House Mafia	
"Breakn' a Sweat"	2012	Skrillex	
"Clarity"	2013	Zedd	Zedd Union Mix
"Alive"	2013	Empire of the Sun	
"Rude"	2014	Magic!	
"Stay the Night"	2014	Zedd	Zedd and Kevin Drew Remix
"Let Me Love You"	2016	DJ Snake	Zedd Remix
"Lost in Japan"	2018	Shawn Mendes	
"365"	2019	Zedd and Katy Perry	
"Die For You"	2021	Valorant featuring Grabbitz	Zedd Remix
"Where You Are"	2023	John Summit featuring Hayla	Zedd Remix

== Music videos ==
=== As lead artist ===
Title	Year	Director	Release date	Label
"Shave It"	2011	Sean Stiegemeier	1 November 2011	Owsla
"Slam the Door"	2012	Justin Nizer	12 January 2012	Owsla
"Spectrum" (featuring Matthew Koma)	2012	Petro	15 August 2012	Interscope Records
"Stache"	2012	Roboto	2 October 2012	Interscope Records
"Clarity" (featuring Foxes)	2013	Jodeb	11 January 2013	Interscope Records
"Stay the Night" (featuring Hayley Williams)	2013	Daniel Cloud Campos	23 September 2013	Interscope Records
"Find You" (featuring Matthew Koma and Miriam Bryant)	2014	Jodeb	16 March 2014	Interscope Records
"I Want You to Know" (featuring Selena Gomez)	2015	Brent Bonacorso	10 March 2015	Interscope Records
"Beautiful Now" (featuring Jon Bellion)	2015	Jodeb	11 June 2015	Interscope Records
"Stay" (with Alessia Cara)	2017	Tim Mattia	18 April 2017	Interscope Records
"The Middle" (with Maren Morris & Gray)	2018	Dave Meyers	21 February 2018	Interscope Records
"365" (with Katy Perry)	2019	Warren Fu	14 February 2019	Interscope Records
"Good Thing" (with Kehlani)	2019	Warren Fu	3 October 2019	Interscope Records

=== As featured artist ===
Title	Year	Director	Release date	Label
"Break Free" (Ariana Grande featuring Zedd)	2014	Chris Marrs Piliero	12 August 2014	Republic Records
"Starving" (Hailee Steinfeld and Grey featuring Zedd) Note: credited but not featured	2016	Darren Craig	27 September 2016	Republic Records
