= True Colors Tour =

2015–16 concert tour by Zedd

- Tour by Zedd
- True Colors Official Poster
- Associated album: True Colors
- Start date: August 6, 2015
- End date: January 11, 2016
- Legs: 3
- No. of shows: 6 in Asia; 11 in Europe; 36 in North America; 53 in total

The True Colors Tour was a headlining concert tour by Russian-German music producer Zedd, launched in support of his studio album True Colors. The tour visited Asia, Europe, and North America from 6 August 2015 to 11 January 2016.

== Set list ==
1. Intro of "Hourglass"
2. Chorus of "Spectrum"
3. "Beautiful Now"
4. "Rather Be (Merk And Kremont Remix)"
5. "Rude (Zedd Remix)"
6. "Breakn' A Sweat (Zedd Remix)"
7. "Stay the Night (Zedd & KDrew Remix)"
8. "Straight Into the Fire"
9. "Bumble Bee"
10. "Illusion"
11. "Break Free"
12. "Clarity"
13. "Fall Into the Sky"
14. "I Want You to Know"
15. "The Legend of Zelda"
16. "Find You"
17. "Papercut"
18. "Done with Love"
19. "True Colors" (Grey Remix)
20. "Spectrum"

== Shows ==
Date	City	Country	Venue	Secret Guest	Attendance			Revenue
Asia
6 August 2015	Clarke Quay	Singapore	Zouk	—	1,500	1,500	100%	$126,500
7 August 2015	Ho Chi Minh City	Vietnam	Rach Chiec Golf Driving Range	—	4,500	5,000	90%	$144,000
8 August 2015	Pasay	Philippines	Mall of Asia Arena	N/A	7,744	10,000	77%	$420,346
11 August 2015 (Note: The August 11, 2015 concert in Bangkok, Thailand at the Thunderdome is a part of the Output Festival.)	Bangkok	Thailand	SCG Stadium	—	—			—
15 August 2015 (Note: The August 15, 2015 concert in Osaka, Japan at the Maishima Sports Island and the August 16, 2015 concert in Tokyo, Japan at the QVC Marine Field are both a part of the Summer Sonic Festival.)	Osaka	Japan	Maishima Sports Island	—	—			—
16 August 2015	Tokyo	Japan	QVC Marine Field	—	—			—
North America
23 August 2015	Las Vegas	United States	Encore Beach Club	—	—			—
29 August 2015	Las Vegas	United States	Encore Beach Club	—	—			—
6 September 2015 (Note: The September 6, 2015 concert in Seattle, Washington is a part of the 2015 Bumbershoot Music Festival.)	Seattle	United States	Seattle Center	—	—			—
8 September 2015 (Note: French producer Madeon was an opening act.) (Note: English producer Alex Metric was an opening act.)	Magna	United States	The Great Saltair	The Chainsmokers	2,843	4,000	71%	$104,781
10 September 2015	Broomfield	United States	1stBank Center	Dominic of Big Gigantic	4,084	7,094	58%	$152,773
12 September 2015	Phoenix	United States	Comerica Theatre	3lau	3,724	5,000	74%	$137,788
15 September 2015	San Diego	United States	Valley View Casino Center	Audien	—			—
16 September 2015	San Francisco	United States	Bill Graham Civic Auditorium	DVBBS	17,016	17,016	100%	$765,720
17 September 2015	San Francisco	United States	Bill Graham Civic Auditorium	Benny Benassi	17,016	17,016	100%	$765,720
18 September 2015 (Note: English electronic music duo AlunaGeorge was an opening act.)	Los Angeles	United States	Staples Center	Steve Angello	9,755	12,418	79%	$512,842
22 September 2015	El Paso	United States	Williams Convention Center	Deorro	—			—
24 September 2015	Austin	United States	Austin360 Amphitheater	Flosstradamus	—			—
25 September 2015	Houston	United States	Bayou Music Center	Borgore	3,436	3,500	98%	$146,495
26 September 2015	Dallas	United States	South Side Ballroom	Mat Zo	6,305	8,006	79%	$254,105
28 September 2015 (Note: The September 28, 2015 show in New Orleans, Louisiana at Bold Sphere Music at Champions Square was cancelled due to inclement weather. It may be rescheduled to a later date.)	New Orleans	United States	Bold Sphere Music at Champions Square	—	see footnote			see footnote
30 September 2015	Cleveland	United States	Jacobs Pavilion at Nautica	Krewella and Adventure Club	—			—
2 October 2015	New York City	United States	Madison Square Garden	—	—			—
3 October 2015 (Note: American producer Dillon Francis was an opening act.) (Note: Australian music project What So Not was an opening act.)	Washington, D.C.	United States	DC Armory	Tommy Trash	6,931	9,000	77%	$283,730
5 October 2015	Wallingford	United States	Oakdale Theatre	DJ Hanzel	2,034	4,560	45%	$75,122
6 October 2015	Kingston	United States	Ryan Center	—	1,939	5,202	37%	$90,853
7 October 2015	Amherst	United States	Mullins Center	Steve Aoki	3,108	5,700	55%	$140,480
9 October 2015	University Park	United States	Bryce Jordan Center	Morgan Page	3,245	3,500	93%	$153,053
10 October 2015	Philadelphia	United States	Liacouras Center	—	4,605	4,605	100%	$206,778
12 October 2015 (Note: The October 12, 2015 show in Columbia, South Carolina at Township Auditorium was cancelled due to safety concerns due to flooding in nearby areas, and so that the authorities could focus on relief efforts, rather than the concert.)	Columbia	United States	Township Auditorium	—	see footnote			see footnote
13 October 2015	Charlotte	United States	Uptown Amphitheatre at NC Music Factory	—	2,678	4,751	56%	$84,174
15 October 2015	Orlando	United States	CFE Arena	Dash Berlin	—	—		
16 October 2015	Miami	United States	Bayfront Park Amphitheatre	Dada Life	3,511	7,500	47%	$127,138
17 October 2015	Tampa	United States	USF Sun Dome	—	—			—
20 October 2015	Atlanta	United States	The Tabernacle	—	2,472	2,562	96%	$84,048
22 October 2015	Grand Rapids	United States	The Delta Plex	—	—			—
23 October 2015	Detroit	United States	Masonic Temple	—	4,821	4,821	100%	$173,556
24 October 2015	Toronto	Canada	Ricoh Coliseum	—	6,098	7,526	81%	$276,411
27 October 2015	Indianapolis	United States	Indiana Farmers Coliseum	—	—			—
29 October 2015	Chicago	United States	UIC Pavilion	Martin Garrix	—			—
30 October 2015	Madison	United States	Alliant Energy Center	Sydney Sierota of Echosmith	—			—
31 October 2015 (Note: Canadian DJ and producer A-Trak was an opening act.)	St. Paul	United States	Roy Wilkins Auditorium	Trick or Treat – Steve Aoki, deadmau5, and Daft Punk (all fake)	—			—
Europe
11 November 2015	Copenhagen	Denmark	Vega, Copenhagen	N/A	—			—
13 November 2015	Oslo	Norway	Sentrum Scene	N/A	—			—
14 November 2015	Stockholm	Sweden	Gota Kallare	N/A	—			—
18 November 2015	Esch-sur-Alzette	Luxembourg	Rockhal	N/A	—			—
20 November 2015	Cologne	Germany	Palladium	N/A	—			—
21 November 2015	Amsterdam	Netherlands	Melkweg	Martin Garrix, Oliver Heldens	—			—
22 November 2015	Paris	France	Le Trianon	N/A		Cancelled immediately by the French president François Hollande for safety due to the November 2015 Paris attacks		
26 November 2015	Dublin	Ireland	Academy Dublin	N/A	—			—
27 November 2015	Glasgow	United Kingdom	O2 Academy Glasgow	N/A	—			—
28 November 2015	Manchester	United Kingdom	The Ritz	N/A	—			—
29 November 2015	London	United Kingdom	The Forum, London	N/A	—			—
Asia
28 December 2015 (Note: The 28 December 2015 concert in Panji, India is a part of the Gosupersonic".)	Panaji	India	Supersonic – GOA	N/A	—			—
31 December 2015	Shanghai	China	West Bund Art Center	N/A	—			—
8 January 2016 (Note: The January 8, 2016 concert in Seoul, South Korea at the AX-Hall is a part of the 5 Nights II".)	Seoul	South Korea	AX-Hall	N/A	—			—
10 January 2016	Chiba	Japan	Chiba Messe	N/A	—			—
11 January 2016	Osaka	Japan	Intex Osaka	N/A	—			—
Total					102,349	122,761	83%	$4,386,693
