= Matthew Koma discography =

Matthew Koma is an American singer, songwriter, and record producer known for his numerous contributions to releases in electronic dance music (EDM) in the 2010s as well as his indie and pop music releases as a solo and contributing artist. He currently fronts the alternative rock band Winnetka Bowling League and is married to fellow pop music singer Hilary Duff.

Koma has collaborated with several producers + artists including Zedd, Bruce Springsteen, Chvrches, Medium Build, Dawes, Tiesto, Alesso, Carly Rae Jepsen, Steve Aoki, RAC, Christian Lee Hutson, Britney Spears, Hilary Duff, Good Charlotte, The Knocks, Afrojack, Flux Pavilion, Demi Lovato, P!NK and others. His collaborations have yielded hit songs such as "Spectrum", Grammy award winning “Clarity” with Zedd, “Wasted" with Tiësto, among others.

== Songwriting & Production Credits ==
Song	Year	Artist(s)	Album
"Live & Learn”	2009	Marshall Crenshaw	Jaggedland
"All the Boys Want”	2010	Emily Osment	Fight or Flight
"Truth or Dare”	2010	Emily Osment	Fight or Flight
"Birthday Dress"	2011	Lil Playy ft. Matthew Koma	Non-album single
"Clarity" (featuring Foxes)	2012	Zedd	Clarity
"Spectrum”	2012	Zedd	Clarity
"Talk Dirty"	2012	Black Cards	Use Your Dellusion
"Rocky Ground (Modern Remix)”	2012	Bruce Springsteen	Wrecking Ball
"Put Your Graffiti on Me"	2012	Kat Graham	Against the Wall
"Years”	2012	Alesso ft. Matthew Koma	Non-album single
"Turn Up the Love"	2012	Far East Movement	Dirty Bass
"This Kiss"	2012	Carly Rae Jepsen	Kiss
"Hurt So Good"	2012	Carly Rae Jepsen	Kiss
"More Than a Memory"	2012	Carly Rae Jepsen	Kiss
"I Know You Have a Girlfriend"	2012	Carly Rae Jepsen	Kiss
"Sweetie"	2012	Carly Rae Jepsen	Kiss
"Melt with You"	2012	Carly Rae Jepsen	Kiss
"Almost Said It"	2012	Carly Rae Jepsen	Kiss
"Calling (Lose My Mind)" (with Alesso featuring Ryan Tedder)	2012	Sebastian Ingrosso	Until Now
"Take a Picture"	2013	Carly Rae Jepsen	Non-album single
"Find You”	2013	Zedd ft. Matthew Koma & Miriam Bryant	Non-album single
"A Town Called Paradise" (featuring Zac Barnett)	2014	Tiesto	A Town Called Paradise
"Wasted” ft. Matthew Koma	2014	Tiesto	A Town Called Paradise
"Set Yourself Free" (featuring Krewella)	2014	Tiesto	A Town Called Paradise
"Body Talk (Mammoth)" (with Like Mike & Moguai featuring Julian Perretta)	2014	Dimitri Vegas	Non-album single
"Someone"	2015	Kelly Clarkson	Piece by Piece
"Cheap Sunglasses”	2015	RAC ft. Matthew Koma	Strangers
"City Of Love"	2015	Mylène Farmer	Interstellaires
"Confetti"	2015	Hilary Duff	Breathe In. Breathe Out.
"Breathe In. Breathe Out."	2015	Hilary Duff	Breathe In. Breathe Out.
"Arms Around a Memory"	2015	Hilary Duff	Breathe In. Breathe Out.
"Addicted to a Memory" (featuring Bahari)	2015	Zedd	True Colors
"Stay Awake"	2015	Bryan Rice	Here Me As I Am
"Home Now"	2017	Shania Twain	Now
"Who's Gonna Be Your Girl"	2017	Shania Twain	Now
"Roll Me on the River"	2017	Shania Twain	Now
"Life's About to Get Good"	2017	Shania Twain	Now
"Babylon"	2018	5 Seconds of Summer	Youngblood
"On the 5"	2018	Winnetka Bowling League	Winnetka Bowling League EP
"Feeling California"	2018	Winnetka Bowling League	Winnetka Bowling League EP
"Feeling Myself"	2018	The Knocks	New York Narcotic
"Slow Dances”	2019	Winnetka Bowling League	Cloudy With A Chance Of Sun
"Swimming in the Stars"	2020	Britney Spears	Glory
"Change Your Mind”	2020	Keith Urban	The Speed Of Now
"Love Me When I Don't"	2021	Pentatonix	The Lucky Ones
"Coffee in Bed"	2021	Pentatonix	The Lucky Ones
"Be My Eyes"	2021	Pentatonix	The Lucky Ones
"A Little Space"	2021	Pentatonix	The Lucky Ones
"Bored"	2021	Pentatonix	The Lucky Ones
"Exit Signs"	2021	Pentatonix	The Lucky Ones
"Never Gonna Cry Again"	2021	Pentatonix	The Lucky Ones
"It's Different Now"	2021	Pentatonix	The Lucky Ones
"Me and My Friends”	2021	Tom Odell	Monsters
"Barcelona” ft Sasha Alex Sloan	2021	Winnetka Bowling League	pulp
"Easy" (with Noah Cyrus)	2021	Demi Lovato	Dancing with the Devil... the Art of Starting Over
"Heartlands"	2022	Mandy Moore	In Real Life
"Little Victories"	2022	Mandy Moore	In Real Life
"Brand New Nowhere"	2022	Mandy Moore	In Real Life
"OCDemon”	2022	Christian Lee Hutson	Quitters
"fiimy” ft. Demi Lovato	2022	Winnetka Bowling League	pulp
"We Cry”	2022	JP Cooper	she
"Turbulence"	2023	Pink	Trustfall
"Over”	2023	Chvrches	Non-album single
"Better Now"	2023	Ruston Kelly	The Weakness
“Sha La La”, “America In Your 20’s [sic]”, “Handsome”, “We’re Not Having Any Fun”, “Astrology & Context”, “Breakfast For Dinner”, “Jesus Saves”,	2024	Winnetka Bowling League	Sha La La
“Are You Awake”, “Shame”, “Mantra”, “Crocodile Tears”, “Sorry, Etc”,”Change Shapes”	2024	Lauren Mayberry	Vicious Creature
“This Is Life”	2024	Winnetka Bowling League ft. Medium Build & Dawes	This Is Life
“Here Comes The Comedy”	2024	Adam Sandler	Love You
"Mature"	2025	Hilary Duff	Luck... or Something

== As a solo artist ==
=== Singles ===
Title	Year	Record label
"One Night"	2013	Cherrytree/Interscope
"So F**kin' Romantic"	2015	RCA
"Kisses Back"	2016	RCA
"Hard to Love"	2017	RCA
"Dear Ana" (featuring Jai Wolf)	2017	RCA
"Suitcase"	2017	RCA

=== Extended plays ===
Title	Details
Parachute	Released: January 1, 2012; Label: Cherrytree/Interscope; Digital download
The Cherrytree Sessions	Released: January 1, 2013; Label: Cherrytree/Interscope; Digital download

== with Winnetka Bowling League ==
=== Albums ===
Title	Details
Sha La La	Released: May 31, 2024; Label: Local Weather / MDDN; Format: Digital download
Sha La La	Deluxe edition (6 additional songs): Released: November 22, 2024; Label: Local Weather / MDDN; Format: Digital download

=== Extended plays ===
Title	Details
Winnetka Bowling League	Released: September 21, 2018; Label: RCA; Format: Digital download
Cloudy with a Chance of Sun	Released: April 26, 2019; Label: RCA; Format: Digital download
Congratulations	September 18, 2020; Label: RCA; Format: Digital download
pulp	February 3, 2022; Label: RCA; Format: Digital download

== As featured artist (selected releases) ==
Title	Year	Peak chart positions									Certifications	Album
Title	Year	US	US Dance	AUT	BEL	FRA	GER	NL	SWE	UK	Certifications	Album
"Spectrum" (Zedd featuring Matthew Koma)	2012	— (Note: did not enter the Billboard Hot 100, but peaked at number five on the Bubbling Under Hot 100 Singles chart.)	10	30	124	—	80	—	—	—	RIAA: Platinum	Clarity
"Years" (Alesso featuring Matthew Koma)	2012	—	31	—	83	163	—	86	24	109	GLF: 2× Platinum	Forever
"Dare You" (Hardwell featuring Matthew Koma)	2013	—	16	—	13	—	—	40	—	18		Non-album singles
"Cannonball (Earthquake)" (Showtek and Justin Prime featuring Matthew Koma)	2013	—	24	—	—	—	—	—	—	29		Non-album singles
"Find You" (Zedd featuring Matthew Koma and Miriam Bryant)	2014	— (Note: did not enter the Billboard Hot 100, but peaked at number one on the Bubbling Under Hot 100 Singles chart.)	10	—	84	—	—	—	—	—	RIAA: Gold; GLF: Gold	Divergent
"Wasted" (Tiësto featuring Matthew Koma)	2014	49	5	21	55	82	49	15	5	3	RIAA: Platinum; BPI: Platinum	A Town Called Paradise
"Cheap Sunglasses" (RAC featuring Matthew Koma)	2014	—	38	—	—	—	—	—	—	—		Strangers
"Never Let You Go" (RAC featuring Matthew Koma and Hilary Duff)	2020	—	—	—	—	—	—	—	—	—		Non-album single
"—" denotes a single that did not chart or was not released.

Note that several of Matthew's singles as solo and featured artist were also released in acoustic or remixed versions.

=== Guest appearances ===
List of non-single guest appearances, with other performing artists, showing year released and album name
Title	Year	Other artist(s)	Album
"End of Pretend"	2012	Black Cards	Use Your Disillusion EP
"Illuminate"	2014	Afrojack	Forget the World
"Keep Our Love Alive"	2014	Afrojack	Forget the World
"Written In Reverse"	2014	Tiësto, Hardwell	A Town Called Paradise
"Hysteria"	2015	Steve Aoki	Neon Future II
"Tempted"	2015	Giorgio Moroder	Déjà Vu
"Over Getting Over You"	2018	Said the Sky	Wide-Eyed
"There Goes My Miracle”	2019	Bruce Springsteen	Western Stars
