= Bahari (band) =

American alt pop duo

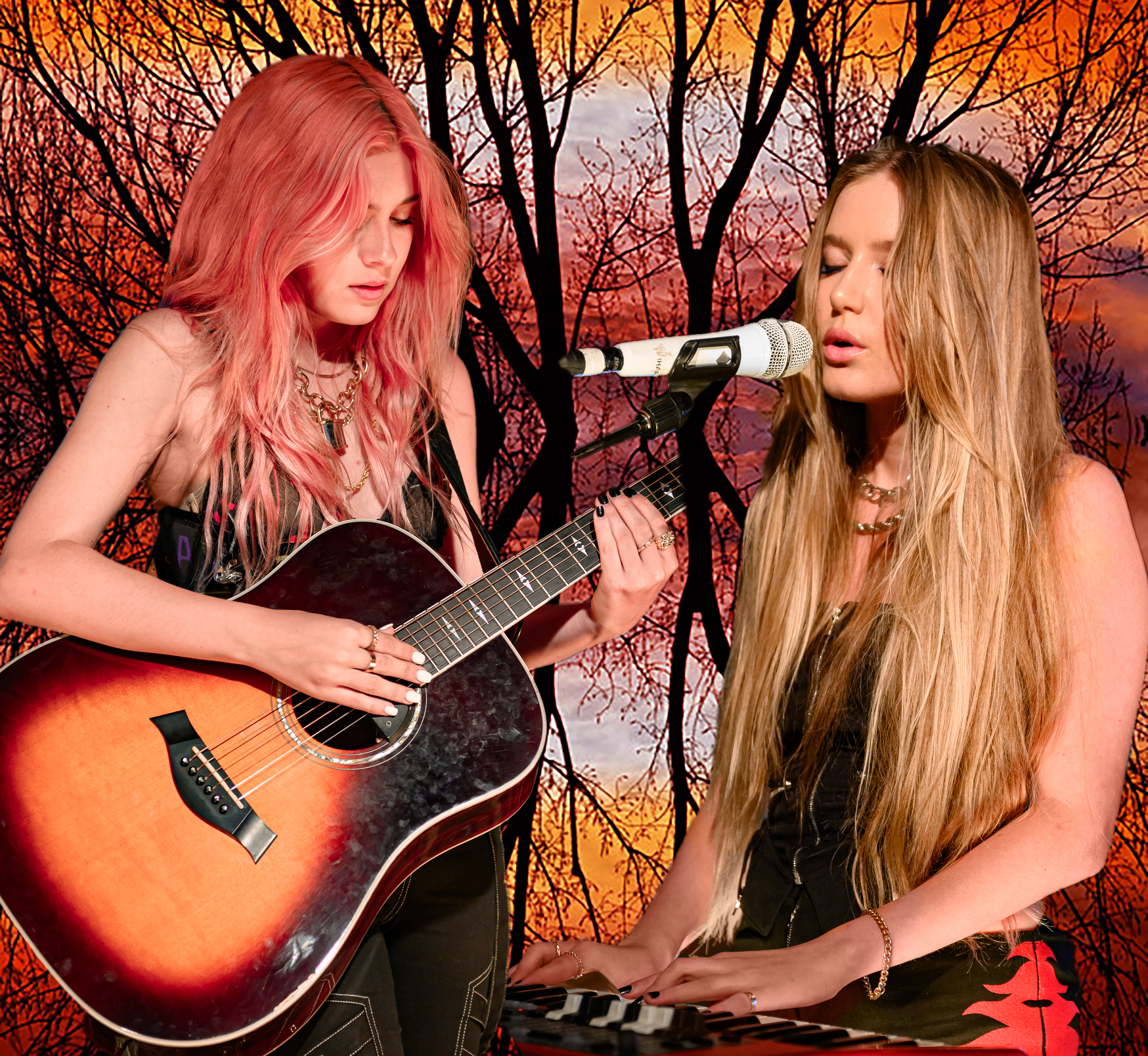

Background information
- Origin: Manhattan Beach, California, U.S.
- Genres: Alt pop; electronic; dark pop
- Years active: 2014–present
- Labels: Interscope; XIX; Rock Mafia; Epic; Heroine Music Group
- Members: Natalia Panzarella
- Past members: Sidney Sartini; Ruby Carr
- Website: bahari-music.com

Bahari is an American alt pop, electronic and dark pop musical duo, previously a trio, composed of Ruby Carr and Natalia Panzarella. Sidney Sartini left the band in 2018. Natalia Panzarella is, as of 2025, the only active member of the group per the group’s official Instagram account.

== History ==
=== Formation, signing with Interscope and Dancing on the Sun (2014–2017) ===
The group consists of vocalist and keyboardist Ruby Carr, who is from South Africa but was raised in Kenya; vocalist and bassist Natalia Panzarella, from Nashville, Tennessee but raised in Los Angeles. They met at a production team in Rock Mafia's studio while working in each member's individual projects. The girls met and started making music together and formed the group, then called Bahari. They signed with Interscope Records and the first song they wrote, "Wild Ones", was released as their debut single on December 30, 2014. It gained popularity online, reaching more than 40 million streams on Spotify and being featured in TV series Teen Wolf and The Royals. The music video was released on April 5, 2016, directed by Darnell Williams. They also appeared in the song "Addicted to a Memory", featured on Zedd's second studio album True Colors.

Their debut extended play, Dancing on the Sun was released on May 13, 2016, with the title track being the first single. Its music video, filmed in the Sequoia National Forest and directed by Marcus Haney was released as an Apple Music exclusive on May 5, 2018. It impacted contemporary hit radio on May 10, 2018, and appeared on TV shows Supergirl and So You Think You Can Dance. They also released music videos for the songs "Altar of the Sun" and "Reasons", also directed by Haney.

During summer 2016, they toured as a supporting act for Birdy as well as for Selena Gomez's Revival Tour. On January 13, 2017, a collaboration with Grey called "I Miss You" was released, with its music video directed by Tobias Nathan being released on April 13, 2017. On January 20, 2017, a cover of The Youngbloods, "Get Together" was put out as a single. Its music video, directed by Darnell Williams and Sam Sturges, was released on January 24, 2017, and the track was featured on the TV series Riverdale.

=== Departure from Interscope, self-released singles and exit of Sidney Sartini (2018) ===
After leaving Interscope, they released some independent singles through 2018; "Fucked Up" on February, which music video was directed by Zac Wolf and premiered in May; the promotional Buffalo Springfield cover "For What It's Worth" in March; "Savage" in April and "Chasers" in July. These releases marked an evolution from the band's initial sound to a more "edgy" pop and electronic approach. Release of their debut album was set in fall 2018.

On December 7, 2018, Bahari announced on the band's official Twitter that Sidney Sartini had "made the choice to go her own way and leave Bahari." They added, "we support her with all of our hearts and love her endlessly." Their last performance as a trio was October 18, 2018.

=== Collaborations, signing with Epic Records and Forget You (2019-present) ===
During 2019, Bahari were featured in Illenium's single "Crashing", later included on his debut album Ascend. They also released some self-released singles as ":(" (also named "Sad Face"), their collaboration with Sultan & Shepard and Rock Mafia "Miles to Your Heart" and "Gameboy".

In 2020 Bahari accompanied Elohim on her US "Group Therapy Tour." They later signed with Epic Records. Their first release with the label was a remix featuring Bia of their previously released viral hit "Savage" on July 17, 2020, along its music video directed by Russell Tandy. On July 31, the duo released their single "Waking Up the Neighbors", which was initially set to be included in their debut studio album. The music video, directed by SVN QNS, premiered the same day. Two more singles "Bipolar" and "Jackie Kennedy" were released on March 5, 2021. The music video for the first, directed by Michael Jurkovac, was unveiled the same day while the one for the second, directed by Nate Mohler, premiered on April 16. Their second EP Forget You was released on July 9. It was followed by the singles "Ways of Love" and "All Around Me" with Cody Lovaas unveiled the same year. In 2022 they dropped their Yoshi Flower collaboration "Hot Mess" and synth ballad "Destructive". In 2023, their single "Kills Me" was released.

In 2024, Bahari and G-Eazy released "Vampires," a B-side to his single, "Nada." In 2025, Bahari released the songs "Don't Let a Good Thing Die" and "Lookout Mountain."

In 2026 Bahari released the singles “Better Than Us”, and “I Do” with Lovelytheband.

== Band members ==
- Natalia Panzarella – vocals, bass (2014–present)
- Sidney Sartini – vocals, guitar (2014–2018)
- Ruby Carr – vocals, keyboard (2014–2023)

== Discography ==
=== Extended plays ===
Title	Notes
Dancing on the Sun	Release date: May 13, 2016; Label: Interscope; Format: Digital download, streaming
Forget You	Release date: July 9, 2021; Label: Bahari LLC, Epic, Heroine Music Group; Format: Digital download, streaming

=== Singles ===
==== As lead artist ====
Title	Year	Album
"Wild Ones"	2014	Non-album single
"Dancing on the Sun"	2016	Dancing on the Sun
"Get Together"	2017	Non-album singles
"Fucked Up"	2018	Non-album singles
"Savage"	2018	Non-album singles
"Chasers"	2018	Non-album singles
"Sad Face" stylized as :(	2019	Non-album singles
"Miles to Your Heart" (with Sultan & Shepard and Rock Mafia)	2019	Echoes of Life: Day
"Gameboy"	2019	Non-album single
"Savage" (featuring Bia)	2020	Forget You
"Waking Up the Neighbors"	2020	Non-album single
"Bipolar"	2021	Forget You
"Jackie Kennedy"	2021	Forget You
"Ways of Love"	2021	TBA
"All Around Me" (with Cody Lovaas)	2021	TBA
"Hot Mess" (with Yoshi Flower)	2022	TBA
"Destructive"	2022	TBA
"Kills Me"	2023	TBA
"Better Than Us"	2026	TBA

==== As featured artist ====
Title	Year	Album
"I Miss You" (Grey featuring Bahari)	2017	Non-album single
"Crashing" (Illenium featuring Bahari)	2019	Ascend
"Vampires" (G-Eazy featuring Bahari)	2024	Helium
"I Do" (lovelytheband featuring Bahari)	2026	TBA

==== Promotional singles ====
Title	Year	Album
"Addicted to a Memory" (Zedd featuring Bahari)	2015	True Colors
"For What It's Worth"	2018	Non-album singles
"Savage" (Bitmastr remix)	2020	Non-album singles

== Music videos ==
=== As lead artist ===
List of music videos as lead artist, showing year released and director(s)
Title	Year	Director	Ref
"Wild Ones"	2016	Darnell Williams	
"Dancing on the Sun"	2016	Marcus Haney	
"Altar of the Sun"	2016	—N/a	
"Reasons"	2016	Marcus Haney	
"Get Together"	2017	Darnell Williams; Sam Sturges	
"Fucked Up"	2018	Zac Wolf	
"Savage"	2018	Enzo Marc	
"Summer Forever"	2018	Aaron Klisman; Adam Fynke	
"Chasers"	2018	Russell Tandy	
"Miles to Your Heart" (with Sultan & Shepard and Rock Mafia)	2019	Ryan Calavano	
"Gameboy"	2019	Alex McDonnell	
"Savage" (featuring Bia)	2020	Rusell Tandy	
"Waking Up the Neighbors"	2020	SVN QNS	
"Bipolar"	2021	Michael Jurkovac	
"Jackie Kennedy"	2021	Nate Mohler	
"Ways of Love"	2022	Juliana Carpino	
"Hot Mess" (with Yoshi Flower)	2022	Loris Russier	
"Kills Me"	2023	Louise de Nexon	
"Better Than Us" (lyric video)	2026		

=== As featured artist ===
List of music videos as featured artist, showing year released and director(s)
Title	Year	Director	Ref
"I Miss You" (Grey featuring Bahari)	2017	Tobias Nathan	
"Crashing" (Illenium featuring Bahari)	2019	Joshua Lipworth	
