= Beautiful Now =

Single by Zedd featuring Jon Bellion

from the album True Colors
- Released: 13 May 2015
- Recorded: 2014
- Genre: Progressive house
- Length: 3:38 (album version); 5:14 (extended mix)
- Label: Interscope
- Songwriters: Zedd; Jon Bellion; Antonina Armato; David Jost; Tim James; Desmond Child
- Producers: Zedd; Rock Mafia

Zedd singles chronology
"I Want You to Know" (2015)	"Beautiful Now" (2015)	"Papercut" (2015)

Jon Bellion singles chronology
"Woke the Fuck Up" (2015)	"Beautiful Now" (2015)	"All Time Low" (2016)

Music video
- "Beautiful Now" on YouTube

"Beautiful Now" is a song by Russian-born German musician Zedd from his second studio album, True Colors (2015), featuring vocals from American singer-songwriter Jon Bellion. It was written by Zedd, Bellion, Antonina Armato, David Jost, Tim James and Desmond Child. The song was released on 13 May 2015 as the album's second single. The song was commercially successful and has been featured on a number of worldwide music charts.

== Background ==
On 8 May 2015, as part of his True Colors promotional campaign, Zedd premiered "Beautiful Now" at the Shedd Aquarium in Chicago, Illinois. Five days later, he announced that he would release the song onto iTunes at 9:00 PM PST. The official audio for the song was uploaded to Zedd's YouTube channel at that same time.

== Composition ==
"Beautiful Now" is a progressive house song with influences of dance-pop written in the key of D major. It runs at 128 BPM. A few hours prior to its release, he tweeted the lyrics from the song's beat break: "BAH BAH BAH BABABAH BAH BAH BABABAH BAH BAH BAH BABABAH BABABABA".

== Music video ==
The music video for "Beautiful Now", directed by Jonathan Desbiens, was released on 11 June 2015.

=== Synopsis ===
The video intertwines five different stories together. The first is of a woman who supposedly drowned her female lover in a pool; the second involves an elderly Central American man who is journeying on an unsuccessful mountain climbing attempt; the third involves the son of a man whose home is invaded by armed robbers; the fourth involves Zedd portraying a liquor store robber who becomes hostile with the management by threatening him with a knife; and the fifth depicts a distraught girl laying down on a railroad.

As the song progresses, the video intercuts to scenes of family happiness, good times with friends, dancing and rejoicing before concluding the five stories. The first woman's lover is pulled from the water before drowning, and the ex realizes the gravity of the situation; the old man attempts to climb the mountain and falls, but survives, without reaching the summit; the armed robbery victim's son confronts the hostiles at gunpoint and subdues them; Zedd's character reflects over what sunk him to his current point in life and seems to change his ways; the suicidal girl is missed by the train and reflects on her life and why she chose such an extreme act. All five people in the stories see themselves in a reflection in various surfaces as their stories are closed and they all resolve to be better people.

== Track listing ==
- CD single and digital download
1. "Beautiful Now" (featuring Jon Bellion) – 3:38
- Digital download (Extended Mix)
1. "Beautiful Now" (featuring Jon Bellion) [Extended Mix] – 5:14
- Digital download (Remixes EP)
1. "Beautiful Now" (Zonderling Remix) – 3:55
2. "Beautiful Now" (KDrew Remix) – 4:00
3. "Beautiful Now" (Dirty South Remix) – 3:19
4. "Beautiful Now" (Charlie Darker Remix) – 4:15
- Digital download (Dirty South Remix)
1. "Beautiful Now" (featuring Jon Bellion) [Dirty South Remix] – 3:18
- Digital download (Grey Remix)
1. "Beautiful Now" (featuring Jon Bellion) [Grey Remix] – 3:10
- Digital download (Rock Mafia Remix)
1. "Beautiful Now" (featuring Jon Bellion) [Rock Mafia Remix] – 2:53

== Grey remix ==
On 29 July 2015, Los Angeles-based duo Grey released their remix of "Beautiful Now" on SoundCloud as a free download. The remix is known for its significant deviation in sound from the original, using a vocoder to give Bellion's vocals a different melody and robotic distortion, and accompanying them with a darker and melodically distinct background inspired by Egyptian music. The remix quickly began receiving coverage across electronic music websites and communities, and was acclaimed for its uniqueness and originality. It also became notable for only being Grey's first release despite its professionality, leading to speculation that the alias belonged to an experienced group of producers now going anonymous. The alias belongs to brothers Kyle and Michael Trewartha, the former of whom previously operated under the alias Singularity.

Eventually, the remix came to the attention of Zedd, who liked and reposted the remix to his official SoundCloud page, and later released the track for purchase on iTunes on 11 September 2015. Zedd has since continued to actively support Grey, playing their remix of Skrillex and Diplo's "Where Are Ü Now" featuring Justin Bieber at his True Colors Tour. He also went on to call Grey "hands down the best electronic music act right now" on Twitter. Grey has since officially remixed two other songs from True Colors; "Papercut" and "True Colors", and toured with Zedd in 2017 as part of his Echo Tour.

== Charts ==
=== Weekly charts ===
Chart (2015)	Peak position
Belgium (Ultratip Bubbling Under Flanders)	33
Belgium Dance (Ultratop Flanders)	27
Belgium (Ultratip Bubbling Under Wallonia)	17
Belgium Dance (Ultratop Wallonia)	32
Canada Hot 100 (Billboard)	61
France (SNEP)	190
Italy Airplay (EarOne)	105
Japan Hot 100 (Billboard)	55
Lebanon (Lebanese Top 20)	5
Mexico Anglo (Monitor Latino)	19
Netherlands (Single Top 100)	91
Netherlands Dance (Dance Top 30)	24
Poland Airplay (ZPAV)	11
Sweden Heatseeker (Sverigetopplistan)	7
US Billboard Hot 100	64
US Hot Dance/Electronic Songs (Billboard)	5
US Dance Club Songs (Billboard)	1
US Pop Airplay (Billboard)	15

=== Year-end charts ===
Chart (2015)	Position
US Dance Club Songs (Billboard)	6
US Hot Dance/Electronic Songs (Billboard)	14

== Certifications ==
Region	Certification	Certified units/sales
Australia (ARIA)	Platinum	70,000^{‡}
Brazil (Pro-Música Brasil)	Platinum	60,000^{‡}
Italy (FIMI)	Gold	25,000^{‡}
Japan (RIAJ)	Gold	100,000^{*}
New Zealand (RMNZ)	Gold	15,000^{‡}
Poland (ZPAV)	Platinum	20,000^{‡}
Spain (Promusicae)	Gold	30,000^{‡}
United States (RIAA)	2× Platinum	2,000,000^{‡}
Streaming
Japan (RIAJ)	Gold	50,000,000^{†}
^{*} Sales figures based on certification alone.^{‡} Sales+streaming figures based on certification alone.^{†} Streaming-only figures based on certification alone.

== Release history ==
Region	Date	Format	Version	Label	Ref.
Various	13 May 2015	Digital download	Original	Intescope	
United States	26 May 2015	Contemporary hit radio	Original	Intescope	
Italy	12 June 2015	Contemporary hit radio	Original	Universal	
United States	16 June 2015	Digital download	Dirty South Remix	Interscope	
United States	10 July 2015	Digital download	Remixes EP	Interscope	
United States	14 August 2015	Digital download	Big Gigantic Remix	Interscope	
United States	11 September 2015	Digital download	Grey Remix	Interscope	
United States	2 October 2015	Digital download	Rock Mafia Remix	Interscope	
United States	4 November 2016	Digital download	Lophiile Remix	Interscope	

== See also ==
- List of number-one dance singles of 2015 (U.S.)
