= True Colors (Zedd album) =

Studio album by Zedd
- Released: 15 May 2015
- Recorded: 2014–2015
- Genres: EDM; electro house; progressive house; complextro
- Length: 50:01
- Label: Interscope
- Producers: Zedd (also exec.); Rock Mafia; KDrew; Botnek

Zedd chronology
Clarity (2012)	True Colors (2015)	Stay + (2017)

Singles from True Colors
- 1. "I Want You to Know" Released: 23 February 2015; 2. "Beautiful Now" Released: 13 May 2015; 3. "Papercut" Released: 17 July 2015; 4. "True Colors" Released: 29 April 2016

True Colors is the second studio album by Russian-German electronic music producer Zedd, released on 15 May 2015 through Interscope Records. The album includes collaborations with artists such as Jon Bellion, Troye Sivan, Selena Gomez, rapper Logic, upcoming production duo Botnek and bands like Echosmith, Bahari and X Ambassadors. It also features uncredited production contributions from Rock Mafia and KDrew.

The first single from the album, "I Want You to Know" featuring Selena Gomez was released on 23 February 2015. The single entered the top 20 on Billboard Hot 100, at number 17. On 14 April 2015, Zedd released another track, "Addicted to a Memory" that features the group Bahari, that was released as a promotional single alongside the preorder of the album on iTunes. "Beautiful Now", featuring the guest vocals of Jon Bellion, was released on iTunes as the album's second official single. The song was released on 13 May 2015. Zedd embarked on the True Colors Tour from August 2015 to January 2016 in support of the album. The album has achieved moderate success, peaking at number one for Billboard's Dance/Electronic Albums, as well as charting on various international charts.

== Background ==
In late February during an interview with a radio station, when answering a question on his album-making processes, Zedd stated that "I'm really far advanced in my album right now. It's probably still going to take me a good month, month-and-a-half to finish it, you know, the last touches. And then depending on if I can keep that promise of one-and-a-half months, it's going to come out sooner or later!" In the middle of March, Zedd took on his Twitter and uploaded a series of short videos that teased True Colors. The videos uploaded unveiled a website that was mostly empty except for Zedd's logo and a timer counting down to the 18 March, at 5 P.M.

On 7 April 2015, Zedd finally released the name, artwork, and release date of the album via Instagram. The artwork features a tree with an array of bright colours as the leaves. He also announced that T-Mobile, through a promotional partnership, offered 250,000 free downloads of the remix of "I Want You to Know" to the fans who followed T-Mobile's Facebook and Twitter on the morning of 8 April.

== Promotions ==
The website revealed the start of a colour-themed promotional campaign for the album that covered 10 North American venues, with a new song to be premiered in each location. When talking about his album, Zedd remarked that he "...wanted fans to experience the album in a whole new way". He further said that each song is associated with a color, and this is evident through his promotional tour, in which each location has different color scheme to match with the vibe of the song previewed in the location. Zedd commented during the promotional campaign in Los Angeles that, "To me, certain things sound a certain color. A lot of reverb will always sound cold, which will always make me think blue. On this song ("Straight into the Fire"), the drop is very energetic and very aggressive, kind of like fire, too, so this one was super easy to pick orange." In Austin, the theme colour was purple, while yellow was used in Phoenix, and blue was used in Denver. The list of places visited by the tour were:

Date	City	Final location	Song previewed	Theme color
19 March 2015	Austin, Texas	Longhorn Cavern State Park	"Addicted to a Memory"	Purple
30 March 2015	Los Angeles, California	A desert near Joshua Tree, California	"Straight into the Fire"	Orange
9 April 2015	Phoenix, Arizona	Lake Pleasant	"Bumble Bee"	Yellow
14 April 2015	San Francisco, California	Alcatraz Island	"Transmission"	Black
27 April 2015	Denver, Colorado	The Stanley Hotel	"Illusion"	Blue
8 May 2015	Chicago, Illinois	Shedd Aquarium	"Beautiful Now"	Magenta
10 May 2015	Philadelphia, Pennsylvania	Fonthill Castle	"Papercut"	White
12 May 2015	Atlanta, Georgia	The Inn at Serenbe	"Daisy"	Green
14 May 2015	Las Vegas, Nevada	Grand Canyon	"Done With Love"	Teal
18 May 2015	New York City, New York	Empire State Building	"True Colors"	Red

== Critical reception ==
Professional ratings
Review scores
Source	Rating
AllMusic	3.5/5 stars
Complex	3.5/5 stars
Newsday	B
Pitchfork	4.2/10
Rolling Stone	3/5 stars
Spin	6/10
Your EDM	9.7/10

Upon its release, True Colors received mixed to positive reviews from music critics. According to Metacritic, which is based on a weighted average score out of 100 from ratings and reviews from music critics, the album received an average score of 60 points ("mixed or average reviews"), based on 2 positive and 3 mixed reviews. The album won Best Electronic Album at the 2016 Billboard Music Awards.

== Singles ==
"I Want You to Know" was released as the first single from the album on 23 February 2015. It features vocals by Selena Gomez and received generally positive reviews from critics. The music video was released on 10 March 2015, directed by Brent Bonacorso and edited by Anthony Chirco. In a promotion with T-Mobile, a remixed version of the song by Milo & Otis was given to fans who followed the instructions given.

"Beautiful Now" was released as the second single from the album on 13 May 2015. It features vocals by Jon Bellion. A teaser was released for the music video for this song on 26 May 2015 and the music video was released on 11 June 2015.

"Papercut" was released as the third single from the album on 17 July 2015. It features vocals by South African-born Australian singer-songwriter Troye Sivan.

American singer Kesha appeared during Zedd's slot at the 2016 Coachella festival to perform Zedd's album-titled song "True Colors" on 17 April 2016. A studio version of the collaboration was released as a single on 29 April 2016. Rolling Stone editor Brittany Spanos called it a "triumphant return" for Kesha.

=== Other songs ===
"Addicted to a Memory" was released as a promotional track to be downloaded when pre-ordered on iTunes beginning 14 April 2015 and was subsequently released to streaming sites such as Spotify and Beats Music later that day. This five-minute track features the American girl group Bahari.

"Bumble Bee", a collaboration with Canadian production duo and Dim Mak Records artists Botnek, was announced as the next promotional single to be released from the album. An extended mix of the track was released on 10 July 2015 through Beatport. On the same day, Botnek posted a 31-track DJ mix titled "The Bumble Bee Mix!" to their SoundCloud page in celebration of the release. The song became the album's only collaborative track, as well as one of the few club-styled tracks on the album.

== Track listing ==
No.	Title	Writer(s)	Producer(s)	Length
1.	"Addicted to a Memory" (featuring Bahari)	Anton Zaslavski; Matthew Koma	Zedd	5:03
2.	"I Want You to Know" (featuring Selena Gomez)	Zaslavski; Ryan Tedder; Kevin Nicholas Drew	Zedd	3:59
3.	"Beautiful Now" (featuring Jon Bellion)	Zaslavski; Jon Bellion; Antonina Armato; Tim James; Desmond Child; David Jost	Zedd; Rock Mafia	3:38
4.	"Transmission" (featuring Logic and X Ambassadors)	Zaslavski; Armato; James; Sir Robert Bryson Hall II; Sam Nelson Harris	Zedd	4:02
5.	"Done with Love"	Zaslavski; Alexander Izquierdo; Jacob Luttrell	Zedd; KDrew	4:56
6.	"True Colors"	Zaslavski; Armato; James	Zedd; Rock Mafia	3:48
7.	"Straight into the Fire"	Zaslavski; Julia Michaels; Sam Martin; Lindy Robbins; Mark Nilan Jr.	Zedd; KDrew	3:41
8.	"Papercut" (featuring Troye Sivan)	Zaslavski; Michaels; Martin; Robbins; Jason Evigan; Austin Paul Flores	Zedd	7:23
9.	"Bumble Bee" (with Botnek)	Zaslavski; Gordon Huntley; Erick Muise; David Gamson; Roger Troutman	Zedd; Botnek	4:07
10.	"Daisy"	Zaslavski; Andreas Schuller; Evigan; Michaels; Danny Parker	Zedd	2:54
11.	"Illusion" (featuring Echosmith)	Zaslavski; Luttrell; Georgia Ku	Zedd	6:26

Japan and Target bonus tracks
No.	Title	Writer(s)	Length
12.	"I Want You to Know" (featuring Selena Gomez) (Marc Benjamin Remix)	Zaslavski; Tedder; Drew; Benjamin
13.	"I Want You to Know" (featuring Selena Gomez) (Fox Stevenson Remix)	Zaslavski; Tedder; Drew; Stanley Byrne

Perfect Edition
No.	Title	Writer(s)	Length
12.	"Stay the Night" (featuring Hayley Williams of Paramore)	Zaslavski; Williams; Benjamin Eli Hanna; Carah Faye	3:37
13.	"Find You" (featuring Matthew Koma and Miriam Bryant)	Zaslavski; Koma; Bryant	3:24
14.	"Clarity" (featuring Foxes) (Tiësto Remix)	Zaslavski; Koma; Skylar Grey; Porter Robinson; Tiësto	5:54
15.	"I Want You to Know" (featuring Selena Gomez) (Scout Remix)	Zaslavski; Ryan Tedder; Kevin Nicholas Drew	2:58
16.	"True Colors" (Grey Remix)	Zaslavski; Armato; James; Kyle Trewartha; Michael Trewartha	3:45
17.	"Addicted to a Memory" (featuring Bahari) (radio edit)	Zaslavski; Koma	3:30
18.	"Rude" (Zedd Remix)	Magic!; Zaslavski	4:33
19.	"Alive" (Zedd Remix)	Empire of the Sun; Zaslavski	3:45

Notes

- "Done with Love" features uncredited vocals by Jacob Luttrell
- "True Colors" features uncredited vocals by Tim James
- "Straight into the Fire" and "Daisy" feature uncredited vocals by Julia Michaels
- "Bumble Bee" interpolates "Break Through" by Roger Troutman.

== Charts ==
=== Weekly charts ===
Chart (2015)	Peak position
Australian Albums (ARIA)	19
Australian Dance Albums (ARIA)	2
Belgian Albums (Ultratop Flanders)	131
Belgian Albums (Ultratop Wallonia)	187
Canadian Albums (Billboard)	6
Finnish Albums (Suomen virallinen lista)	21
German Albums (Offizielle Top 100)	50
Italian Albums (FIMI)	51
Japanese Albums (Oricon)	13
Norwegian Albums (VG-lista)	8
Scottish Albums (Official Charts)	32
South Korean International Albums (Gaon)	46
Spanish Albums (Promusicae)	75
Swedish Albums (Sverigetopplistan)	14
Swiss Albums (Schweizer Hitparade)	68
UK Albums (Official Charts)	42
UK Dance Albums (Official Charts)	4
US Billboard 200	4
US Top Dance Albums (Billboard)	1

=== Year-end charts ===
Chart (2015)	Position
Japanese Albums (Billboard Japan)	75
US Billboard 200	199
US Top Dance/Electronic Albums (Billboard)	4

Chart (2016)	Position
US Top Dance/Electronic Albums (Billboard)	22

== Certifications ==
Region	Certification	Certified units/sales
Canada (Music Canada)	Gold	40,000^{‡}
Singapore (RIAS)	Gold	5,000^{*}
United States (RIAA)	Gold	500,000^{‡}
^{*} Sales figures based on certification alone.^{‡} Sales+streaming figures based on certification alone.

== Release history ==
Region	Date	Format(s)	Label	Ref.
Australia	15 May 2015	CD; digital download	Universal	
Germany	15 May 2015	CD; digital download	Universal	
United States	18 May 2015	CD; digital download	Interscope	
Ireland	3 July 2015	CD; digital download	Universal	
United Kingdom	6 July 2015	CD; digital download	Polydor	
