= Chameleon (EP) =

EP by Grey
- Released: September 29, 2017
- Recorded: 2017
- Genre: Electronic
- Length: 18:44
- Label: Universal Music Group
- Producer: Grey

Chameleon is the debut extended play (EP) by American electronic duo Grey. Released on September 29, 2017, it features vocalists Asia Whiteacre, Skott, Avril Lavigne, Circa Survive frontman Anthony Green, Frances and Stephen.

== Background and Release ==
The track "Chameleon" was featured in a promotional tweet on April 27, 2017, the first known audio from the EP. An official announcement was revealed via Twitter on September 7, 2017, alongside the announcement and release of the promotional single "Crime" featuring Skott. The EP was given a September 29 release date.

== Track listing ==
No.	Title	Writer(s)	Length
1.	"Chameleon" (featuring Asia)	Kyle Trewartha; Michael Trewartha; Asia Whiteacre; Stephanie Jones	3:07
2.	"Crime" (featuring Skott)	K. Trewartha; M. Trewartha; Rotana Tarabzouni; Pauline Skött; Thomas Meredith; Linnea Södahl	2:55
3.	"Wings Clipped" (featuring Avril Lavigne and Anthony Green)	K. Trewartha; M. Trewartha; Whiteacre; Kristine Flaherty; Anthony Green; Andrew Jackson	4:33
4.	"Room 101" (featuring Frances)	K. Trewartha; M. Trewartha; Sophie Cooke; Rachel Furner	3:40
5.	"These Roots" (featuring Stephen)	K. Trewartha; M. Trewartha; Stephen Swartz	4:29
Total length:			18:44
