= Bumble Bee (Zedd and Botnek song) =

Promotional single by Zedd and Botnek

from the album True Colors
- Released: 10 July 2015
- Recorded: July 2014
- Genre: Big room house; electro house; complextro
- Length: 4:07 (album version); 4:20 (extended mix)
- Label: Interscope
- Songwriters: Anton Zaslavski; Gordon Huntley; Erick Muise; David Gamson; Roger Troutman
- Producers: Zedd; Botnek

"Bumble Bee" is a song by Russian-German DJ Zedd and Canadian production duo Botnek, from Zedd's second studio album, True Colors. It was written by Zedd, Botnek, David Gamson and Roger Troutman and was released on 10 July 2015 as the second promotional single. The song features additional uncredited talk box vocals from Chromeo member Patrick "P-Thugg" Gemayel – which appear halfway through the track – and heavily samples lyrics from Roger Troutman's 1991 song "Break Through".

Like Zedd's previous promotional single, "Addicted to a Memory", "Bumble Bee" was also compared to his previous complextro "classics" and true EDM sounds; tracks like "Shave It" and "Dovregubben".

== Background ==
On 4 June 2014 — approximately one year before the release of True Colors — Zedd posted a short video clip on Instagram containing a close-up of a computer that was emitting a low buzzing noise. The post was also captioned with bumble bee emoticons.

In an interview with EDMTunes.com Botnek said: "Zedd approached us after hearing our edit of everyone’s favourite song "Animals". We had to wrap our heads around what magic was in that edit that he loved, and came up with the drop you hear now in "Bumble Bee". He immediately wrote back saying he loved it and only hours later had written and sent over the progression that's still there in the track. I remember listening to it on my phone and being immediately down with it. So the idea was completely finished in one day really!"

== Composition ==
"Bumble Bee" is a complextro song that was described as one of the few club-styled tracks on the album. It lasts four minutes and seven seconds and has a tempo of 128 BPM.

EDMTunes.com said: "Complextro, as it is known, has since waned in popularity and many of its most prominent artists sound have shifted their sound, but that doesn't mean it ceased to exist. In fact, there was one track on True Colors that perfectly embodied the high intensity and fast pace of complextro and it was the collaboration with electro-duo Botnek known as 'Bumble Bee.'"

== Track listing ==
- Digital download
1. "Bumble Bee" (original mix / album version) – 4:07
- Digital download (Extended Mix)
1. "Bumble Bee" (extended mix) – 4:20
