= Papercut (Zedd song) =

2015 song by Zedd featuring Troye Sivan

Single by Zedd featuring Troye Sivan

from the album True Colors
- Released: 17 July 2015
- Recorded: May 2015
- Genre: Synth-pop; house-pop
- Length: 7:24
- Label: Interscope
- Songwriters: Anton Zaslavski; Julia Michaels; Sam Martin; Lindy Robbins; Jason Evigan; Austin Paul Flores
- Producer: Zedd

Zedd singles chronology
"Beautiful Now" (2015)	"Papercut" (2015)	"Candyman" (2016)

Troye Sivan singles chronology
"Happy Little Pill" (2014)	"Papercut" (2015)	"Wild" (2015)

Audio video
- "Papercut" on YouTube

"Papercut" is a song by German DJ and record producer Zedd from his second studio album, True Colors which features vocals from Australian singer-songwriter Troye Sivan. It was written by Zedd, Julia Michaels, Sam Martin, Lindy Robbins, Jason Evigan and Austin Paul Flores and produced by Zedd. It was released as the third single on July 17, 2015.

== Background ==
In an interview Zedd said: "I thought "Papercut" would probably be my least favorite song, actually, because it's so long and it's not very catchy. It's unconventional and has this long dip in the middle, which to me is like the movie moment where you close your eyes and see Inception or Interstellar. I love that kind of stuff but I thought people wouldn't."

"Papercut" was premiered at Zedd's True Colors Experience on 10 May 2015 in Philadelphia, Pennsylvania. The listening session was held in Fonthill Castle, chosen to reflect the cinematic nature of the song.

Sivan revealed in a YouTube video on 29 June 2015 that he and Zedd didn't meet each other at all to do the song: "I just went into the studio one day and recorded the vocal and left...and that was it."

On 17 July 2015, Zedd uploaded the song audio onto his Vevo account, featuring an updated single cover. The song was chosen over "Bumble Bee" as the third single on his LP.

== Critical reception ==
The song has received positive reviews from critics, who praised Sivan's vocals on the track. Nic Kelly from Project U wrote, "At the start, "Papercut" sounds like it could be a ballad. Then it sounds like it could be in Frozen. Then the beat kicks and Troye starts singing and it's exceptionally amazing," and said Sivan is "the perfect vocalist for this." Chris Haigh, from Pop Insomniacs, called the track a "highlight of the album" and "an impressive slice of house-pop helmed by Sivan's promising vocals". Glenn Gamboa, from Newsday, said the track is "a fascinating suite of synth-pop".

== Composition ==
An electro house song with a dance-pop melody. It lasts for seven minutes and twenty three seconds and has a tempo of 126 BPM. The song has two EDM drops, one is more electro and the other more progressive.

== Track listing ==
- Digital download
1. "Papercut" (featuring Troye Sivan) – 7:23
- Grey Remix
1. "Papercut" (featuring Troye Sivan) (Grey Remix) – 3:34

== Charts ==
Chart performance for "Papercut"
Chart (2015)	Peak position
Australia (ARIA)	93
US Hot Dance/Electronic Songs (Billboard)	31

== Release history ==
Release dates and formats for "Papercut"
Region	Date	Format	Version	Label	Ref.
Various	15 May 2015	Digital download; streaming	Original	Interscope	
Various	9 December 2015	Digital download; streaming	Grey Remix	Interscope	
