= Yoshi Flower =

American musician

- Born: Joshua Smith; January 9, 1995 (age 31); Detroit, Michigan
- Website: www.yoshiflower.me

Joshua Smith (born January 9, 1995), known professionally as Yoshi Flower, is an American singer, songwriter and record producer who is signed to Interscope Records.

== Early life ==
Joshua Smith was born in Detroit, Michigan. His father gave him his first guitar, which he received in lieu of money from an artist when his son was 6. At age 12 his father began to let him play in local Detroit bars.

== Career ==
2014-2019: Career beginnings

Smith began releasing music and playing live shows in his hometown Detroit. He played in various bands, and released 2 EPs as part of the duo Gosh Pith to critical acclaim. In 2017, he wrote and recorded his first solo demos while living in Topanga, California with electronic artist Elohim. The first of which, “Movies,” surfaced in March 2018 with The Fader comparing his lyrics to Lana Del Rey.

After releasing two more songs independently, “Woke” and “Just On Drugs” respectively, Flower signed a record deal with Interscope Records. Following his singing, he released the Brown Paper Bag (Maxi) single via GRDN/Interscope Records. The lead single of which was featured in the Netflix show ‘On My Block.’ The project also included a remix from Take A Day Trip, and a reimagined version of the single featuring Rico Nasty.

On October 12, 2018, he released “American Raver,” the first of a series of 3 mixtapes. I-D magazine labeled the project a “pledge of allegiance gone goth,” and wrote that it "straddles the edge of rave culture and the rage that dominates our everyday." The project explores drugs, identity, escapism, and capitalism. In the summer of 2019 he followed up with a 2nd mixtape titled “Peer Pleasure.” Paper Magazine noted his ability to bend genres in his music. The third and final installment, “I Will Not Let My Love Go To Waste” came in December 2019. The project touches on heart-break, addiction, control and near death experience. In 2020 he began working on his major-label debut album.

== Discography ==
List of mixtapes
Title	Details
American Raver	• Released: October 12, 2018 • Label: Interscope • Format: Digital download
Peer Pleasure	• Released: June 7, 2019 • Label: Interscope • Format: Digital download
I Will Not Let My Love Go To Waste	• Released: December 6, 2019 • Label: Interscope • Format: Digital download
Saint Helena	• Released: November 29, 2024 • Label: Heroine Music Group LLC • Format: Digital download
