= Addicted to a Memory =

Promotional single by Zedd featuring Bahari

from the album True Colors
- Released: 14 April 2015
- Recorded: 2014
- Genre: Electro house; complextro
- Length: 5:03
- Label: Interscope
- Songwriters: Anton Zaslavski; Matthew Koma
- Producer: Zedd

"Addicted to a Memory" is a song by Russian-German DJ and record producer Zedd and features vocals from American girl group Bahari from his second studio album, True Colors. It was written by Zedd and Matthew Koma and was released on 14 April 2015 as a promotional single.

The song has received positive reviews and many called it a departure from his previous "pop-y" sounds. It was also compared to his previous electro songs, like "Stars Come Out", "Slam the Door" and "Shave It Up". The song was featured in a 2015 Gatorade commercial starring Lionel Messi.

== Background ==
"Addicted to a Memory" began as a demo of Zedd's which was sent to Lady Gaga in 2012. After hearing the demo, Gaga called Jimmy Iovine of Interscope Records and told him to sign Zedd to the label. About the song, Zedd stated: "I think you can hear my actual development as an artist within the song. It's almost like a time lapse of my career."

== Composition ==
"Addicted to a Memory" is an electro house song with a piano medley intro. It lasts 5 minutes and 3 seconds and has a tempo of 128 BPM. The song has three EDM drops; the last one is very different from the first two.

EDMTunes said: "The track has a predictable pop beginning, which might signal a typical radio-friendly hit, but Zedd has a surprise in store for you. Wait for the build and you'll notice some electro elements making their way into the track and when that drop finally hits, it sounds like the good old Zedd from his 'Slam the Door' days."

== Track listing ==
- CD single and digital download
1. "Addicted to a Memory" (featuring Bahari) – 5:03

== Charts ==
=== Weekly charts ===
Chart (2015)	Peak position
US Hot Dance/Electronic Songs (Billboard)	18

=== Year-end charts ===
Chart (2015)	Position
US Hot Dance/Electronic Songs (Billboard)	94
