= I Want You to Know (Zedd song) =

Single by Zedd featuring Selena Gomez

from the album True Colors
- Released: 23 February 2015
- Recorded: 2014
- Genre: EDM; electropop
- Length: 3:59
- Label: Interscope
- Songwriters: Anton Zaslavski; Ryan Tedder; Kevin Nicholas Drew
- Producers: Zedd; Ryan Tedder

Zedd singles chronology
| "Break Free" (2014) | "I Want You to Know" (2015) | "Beautiful Now" (2015) |

Selena Gomez singles chronology
| "The Heart Wants What It Wants" (2014) | "I Want You to Know" (2015) | "Good for You" (2015) |

Music video
- "I Want You to Know" on YouTube

"I Want You to Know" is a song by German music producer Zedd, featuring vocals from American singer Selena Gomez from the former's second studio album, True Colors (2015). It was written by Zedd, OneRepublic's frontman Ryan Tedder, and KDrew. "I Want You to Know" was released on 23 February 2015 as the album's lead single and debuted on American contemporary hit radio on 3 March 2015, receiving generally positive reviews from music critics. It charted within the top 10 in Finland, as well as the top 40 in fifteen additional countries. It has been certified platinum in the United States and Sweden. It won a Latin American Music Award for Favorite Dance Song in 2015. It is also featured in the video games Guitar Hero Live, Dance Dance Revolution A and NBA 2K16.

== Background ==
"I Want You to Know" is an EDM and electropop track written by Zedd, Ryan Tedder, and KDrew. Tedder and Zedd had previously worked together on Clarity album track "Lost at Sea". Tedder called Zedd when he had an idea of a track. Zedd and Gomez first met by accident on 4 December 2014, with Zedd stating: "Our studios are right across the street from each other, and I just went to the bathroom and ran into her at the studio." The following day, Gomez posted a picture online with Zedd although did not confirm they were working together. Describing her featuring, he said: "We recorded her vocal and I loved it, and I never tried anyone else on [the song]." Commenting on the song, Tedder said: "Zedd crushed it."

== Composition ==
Musically, according to the sheet music published at Musicnotes.com, "I Want You to Know" is written in the key of A Minor with a tempo of 130 beats per minute. It follows a chord progression of Am-Em-F-Cadd9-C.

== Critical reception ==
The song has received generally positive reviews. Nolan Feeney of Time applauded the collaboration between Zedd and Gomez saying they "make beautiful music together". He explained: "Zedd's futuristic synthesizers recall 'Break Free,' his literally-out-of-this-world collaboration with Ariana Grande, but Gomez [...] keeps the track from becoming a lifeless carbon copy." Jason Lipshutz of Billboard wrote that Gomez "finally hit her mark" with the song. "Gomez has never been known as a vocal powerhouse, but she deftly handles patently overdramatic lines [...] with the proper amount of yearning and unflappability. When that first drop does arrive about 80 seconds in, Zedd provides a swiveling party scene with a whiff of Daft Punk's maximalist disco thrown in for good measure." Writing for the same publication, Dan Hyman awarded the song two stars out of a possible five, stating that it "never finds its footing, and never rises above the clichéd EDM formula it follows to a T".

Music Times praised the song: "The duo's real life chemistry is present in "I Want You to Know," with Gomez's voice weaving perfectly through the beat, and it's a wonder why she hasn't ventured much into the world of EDM before." Inquisitr called this song "underwhelming given all the hype." Idolator also wrote a mixed opinion "Zedd borrows his tried-and-true EDM formula that doesn’t bring anything new to the genre, while Gomez’s vocals churn around the rhythms like clothes on auto-spin. It is not the most exciting track, but it will have people bopping at the nightclubs."

== Chart performance ==
Two days after its release, the song debuted at No. 6 on the US Dance/Electronic Digital Songs chart and No. 9 on the full US Dance/Electronic Songs chart. On the chart dated 14 March 2015, "I Want You to Know" debuted at number 24 on the US Mainstream Top 40 chart (the highest debut on the chart that week) and at number 22 on the US Dance/Mix Show Airplay chart. On the week of 14 March, the song debuted at its peak position of number 17 on the US Billboard Hot 100. It also peaked at number 14 in UK Singles Chart. As of July 2015, "I Want You To Know" has sold 511,000 copies in the US. It has been certified 2x Platinum in the United States.

In France, although the song failed to enter into the French Singles Chart's top forty, it peaked at no. 12 at the French Airplay Chart.

It has been certified Platinum in Sweden. It has also been certified Gold in Australia, Denmark and Italy.

== Music video ==
The music video was released on 10 March 2015 on Vevo. It was directed by Brent Bonacorso and edited by Anthony Chirco. Zedd said, "It's gonna be a sexy 70s video with a lot of very interesting effects. Really cool." The video focuses on Gomez going to a party club and dancing while Zedd appears as a hologram. The disco scenes are intercut with scenes where Zedd and Gomez are together illuminated by strobe lights.

== Awards and nominations ==
| Year | Award | Category | Result |
|---|---|---|---|
| 2015 | Teen Choice Awards | Choice Party Song | Nominated |
| 2015 | Teen Choice Awards | Choice Theme Song | Won |
| 2015 | Latin American Music Awards | Favorite Dance Song | Won |

== Formats and track listings ==
Digital download and CD single
| No. | Title | Length |
|---|---|---|
| 1. | "I Want You to Know" (featuring Selena Gomez) | 3:58 |

Digital download – Lophiile Remix
| No. | Title | Length |
|---|---|---|
| 1. | "I Want You to Know" (featuring Selena Gomez) (Lophiile Remix) | 2:58 |

Digital download – Remixes
| No. | Title | Length |
|---|---|---|
| 1. | "I Want You to Know" (featuring Selena Gomez) (Fox Stevenson Remix) | 3:44 |
| 2. | "I Want You to Know" (featuring Selena Gomez) (Marc Benjamin Remix) | 4:57 |
| Total length: | | 8:41 |

== Credits and personnel ==
- Selena Gomez – lead vocals, background vocals
- Anton Zaslavski, Ryan Tedder, Kevin Nicholas Drew – songwriters
- Zedd – producer

== Charts ==
=== Weekly charts ===
Weekly chart performance for "I Want You to Know"
| Chart (2015) | Peak position |
|---|---|
| Australia (ARIA) | 22 |
| Austria (Ö3 Austria Top 40) | 36 |
| Belgium (Ultratop 50 Flanders) | 40 |
| Belgium (Ultratip Bubbling Under Wallonia) | 6 |
| Canada Hot 100 (Billboard) | 19 |
| CIS Airplay (TopHit) | 60 |
| Czech Republic Airplay (ČNS IFPI) | 26 |
| Czech Republic Singles Digital (ČNS IFPI) | 10 |
| Denmark (Tracklisten) | 25 |
| Euro Digital Song Sales (Billboard) | 15 |
| Finland (Suomen virallinen lista) | 7 |
| France (SNEP) | 61 |
| France Airplay (SNEP) | 12 |
| Germany (GfK) | 39 |
| Hong Kong (HKRIA) | 12 |
| Hungary (Single Top 40) | 12 |
| Hungary (Stream Top 40) | 14 |
| Ireland (IRMA) | 23 |
| Italy (FIMI) | 49 |
| Japan Hot 100 (Billboard) | 21 |
| Mexico Anglo (Monitor Latino) | 17 |
| Netherlands (Dutch Top 40) | 30 |
| Netherlands (Single Top 100) | 34 |
| Norway (VG-lista) | 15 |
| Scottish Singles Sales (Official Charts) | 5 |
| Slovakia Airplay (ČNS IFPI) | 53 |
| Slovakia Singles Digital (ČNS IFPI) | 18 |
| Spain (Promusicae) | 85 |
| Sweden (Sverigetopplistan) | 23 |
| Switzerland (Schweizer Hitparade) | 48 |
| UK Singles (Official Charts) | 14 |
| UK Dance (Official Charts) | 4 |
| Ukraine Airplay (TopHit) | 35 |
| US Billboard Hot 100 | 17 |
| US Adult Pop Airplay (Billboard) | 36 |
| US Hot Dance/Electronic Songs (Billboard) | 1 |
| US Dance Club Songs (Billboard) | 14 |
| US Pop Airplay (Billboard) | 11 |
| US Rhythmic Airplay (Billboard) | 40 |

=== Year-end charts ===
2015 year-end chart performance for "I Want You to Know"
| Chart (2015) | Position |
|---|---|
| Australia Dance (ARIA) | 21 |
| Belgium Dance (Ultratop Flanders) | 96 |
| Belgium Dance (Ultratop Wallonia) | 47 |
| Canada (Canadian Hot 100) | 93 |
| Netherlands Dance (MegaCharts) | 34 |
| Sweden (Sverigetopplistan) | 99 |
| US Hot Dance/Electronic Songs (Billboard) | 10 |

=== Decade-end charts ===
Decade-end chart performance for "I Want You to Know"
| Chart (2010–2019) | Position |
|---|---|
| US Hot Dance/Electronic Songs (Billboard) | 43 |

== Certifications ==
Certifications for "I Want You to Know"
| Region | Certification | Certified units/sales |
|---|---|---|
| Australia (ARIA) | 2× Platinum | 140,000^{‡} |
| Denmark (IFPI Danmark) | Gold | 30,000^{^} |
| Germany (BVMI) | Gold | 200,000^{‡} |
| Italy (FIMI) | Gold | 25,000^{‡} |
| New Zealand (RMNZ) | Gold | 7,500^{*} |
| Sweden (GLF) | Platinum | 40,000^{‡} |
| United Kingdom (BPI) | Silver | 200,000^{‡} |
| United States (RIAA) | 2× Platinum | 2,000,000^{‡} |
^{*} Sales figures based on certification alone.^{^} Shipments figures based on certification alone.^{‡} Sales+streaming figures based on certification alone.

== Release history ==
Release dates for "I Want You to Know"
| Country | Date | Format | Label |
|---|---|---|---|
| Italy | 27 February 2015 | Contemporary hit radio | Interscope |
| United States | 3 March 2015 | Contemporary hit radio | Interscope |
| Ireland | 7 June 2015 | Digital download | Interscope |
| United Kingdom | 7 June 2015 | Digital download | Interscope |
