= KDrew =

American producer and DJ

- Born: Kevin Nicholas Drew; November 7, 1989 (age 36)
- Origin: New Jersey, U.S.
- Genres: EDM, reggae, dancehall
- Occupations: DJ, producer

Kevin Nicholas Drew (born November 7, 1989), better known as his alias KDrew, is an American record producer and DJ from New Jersey. KDrew produces primarily EDM and is perhaps best known for his remixes for Zedd and Lady Gaga, although his original records "Bullseye" and "Circles" have generated millions of plays online.

The Boston Celtics of the NBA used "Circles" as the intro music for their home games at TD Garden. KDrew has also done official remixes for Nelly Furtado, Adventure Club, T.I. and others and collaborated with Taryn Manning on "Summer Ashes", which was released on July 23, 2013.

On February 5, 2015, MTV premiered KDrew's music video for "Let Me Go". KDrew performed at Global Dance Festival at Red Rocks Amphitheatre. He co-wrote the song "I Want You to Know" by Zedd featuring Selena Gomez, alongside Zedd and Ryan Tedder. KDrew also features as an additional producer on the tracks "Done with Love" and "Straight into the Fire" off Zedd's True Colors album. KDrew co-produced two songs on Hilary Duff's Breathe In. Breathe Out. album, "Confetti" and "Arms Around a Memory".
