= Grey (duo) =

American electronic music duo

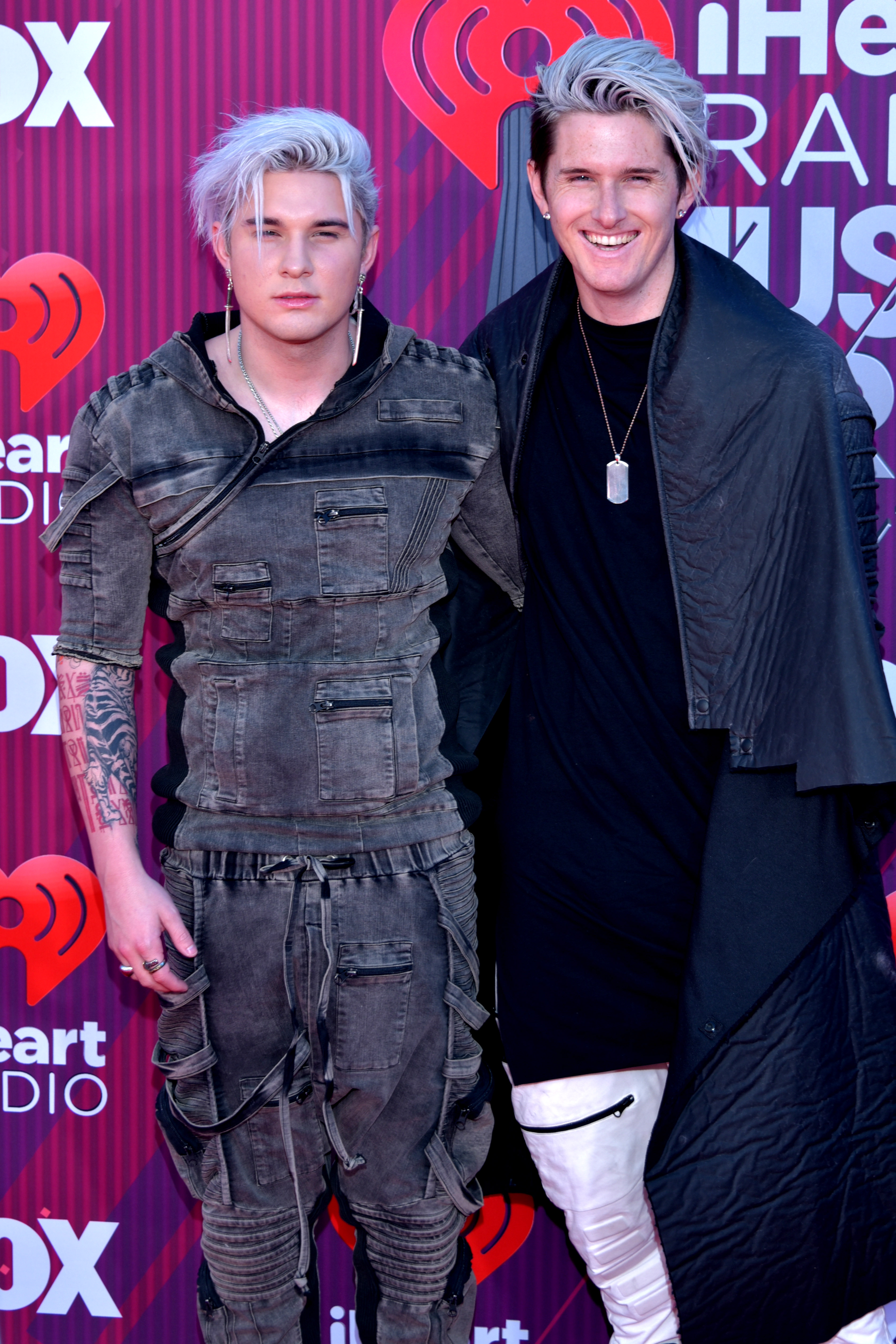
- Grey at the 2019 iHeartRadio Music Awards

Background information
- Origin: Los Angeles, California, U.S.
- Genres: EDM; pop; future bass
- Years active: 2015–present
- Label: Island
- Members: Kyle Trewartha; Michael Trewartha
- Website: Official website

Grey is an American electronic music duo consisting of brothers Kyle and Michael Trewartha. They are best known for their debut 2016 single "Starving", with American singer Hailee Steinfeld and production work by Zedd, and "The Middle", a 2018 single featured with Zedd and Maren Morris. They primarily produce music of the future bass genre.

== Background ==
Brothers Kyle and Michael Trewartha grew up in Fountain Valley, California. Kyle played guitar in a metal band before releasing original songs and remixes in electronic genres such as dubstep and electro house under the name Singularity from 2011 to 2014. He also had two releases under the name Kyle Tree in 2015 and 2016. In 2013, Michael started to learn how to produce music.

They officially formed as Grey in 2015, first releasing remixes of “Beautiful Now” by Zedd ft. Jon Bellion and "Where Are Ü Now" by Jack Ü, later remixing songs by artists including Zedd, Selena Gomez, Troye Sivan, Mike Posner and Ariana Grande. In 2016, they released their debut single "Starving" with Hailee Steinfeld and Zedd. Their debut EP, Chameleon, was released on September 29, 2017. In 2018, they released "The Middle" with Maren Morris and Zedd and signed to Island Records. They released the single "Want You Back" featuring Léon on January 10, 2019.

== Discography ==
=== Extended plays ===
Title	Details
Chameleon	Released: September 29, 2017; Label: #808080 (Universal); Format: Digital download, CD
Light	Released: October 23, 2020; Label: Self-released; Format: Digital download
Dark	Released: December 11, 2020; Label: Self-released; Format: Digital download
Contra	Released: February 2, 2024; Label: Lowly; Format: Digital download

=== Singles ===
List of singles, with selected chart positions and certifications
Title	Year	Peak chart positions										Certifications	Album
Title	Year	US	US Pop	AUS	CAN	DEN	ITA	NOR	NZ	SWE	UK	Certifications	Album
"Starving" (with Hailee Steinfeld featuring Zedd)	2016	12	5	5	8	39	11	5	5	5	5	RIAA: 4× Platinum; ARIA: 2× Platinum; BPI: Platinum; FIMI: 2× Platinum; GLF: Platinum; IFPI DEN: Gold; MC: 4× Platinum; RMNZ: 4× Platinum	Haiz
"Adrenaline" (with Zedd)	2016	—	—	—	—	—	—	—	—	—	—		Non-album singles
"I Miss You" (featuring Bahari)	2017	—	—	—	—	—	—	—	—	—	—		Non-album singles
"The Middle" (with Zedd and Maren Morris)	2018	5	1	7	6	20	68	10	8	19	7	RIAA: 6× Platinum; ARIA: 10× Platinum; BPI: Silver; FIMI: Gold; GLF: Gold; MC: 3× Platinum; RMNZ: 4× Platinum	Non-album singles
"Want You Back" (featuring Léon)	2019	—	—	—	—	—	—	—	—	—	—		Non-album singles
"First Time" (featuring Robinson)	2019	—	—	—	—	—	—	—	— (Note: "First Time" did not enter the NZ Top 40 Singles Chart, but peaked at number 28 on the NZ Hot Singles Chart.)	—	—		Non-album singles
"Criminal"	2019	—	—	—	—	—	—	—	—	—	—		Non-album singles
"Grey Area" (featuring Sofia Carson)	2019	—	—	—	—	—	—	—	—	—	—		Non-album singles
"Body Count" (featuring Thutmose)	2020	—	—	—	—	—	—	—	—	—	—		Non-album singles
"FAYF"	2020	—	—	—	—	—	—	—	—	—	—		Non-album singles
"Hurricane" (with Cheat Codes and Tyson Ritter)	2021	—	—	—	—	—	—	—	—	—	—		Hellraisers, Pt. 2
"Dance with You" (with Laura Marano)	2021	—	—	—	—	—	—	—	— (Note: "Dance with You" did not enter the NZ Top 40 Singles Chart, but peaked at number 39 on the NZ Hot Singles Chart.)	—	—		The Perfect Date
"7-DS" (with AWAY)	2023	—	—	—	—	—	—	—	—	—	—		Contra
"Raven" (with Virtual Riot)	2023	—	—	—	—	—	—	—	—	—	—		Contra
"Contra"	2023	—	—	—	—	—	—	—	—	—	—		Contra
"What Have They Done to Us" (League of Legends) (with Mako and Sasha Alex Sloan)	2024	—	—	—	—	—	—	—	—	—	—		Arcane League of Legends: Season 2: Extended edition
"—" denotes releases that did not chart or were not released in that territory.

=== Promotional singles ===
Title	Year	Album
"Crime" (featuring Skott)	2017	Chameleon

=== Other appearances ===
Title	Year	Other artist(s)	Album
"Crown"	2017	Camila Cabello	Bright: The Album
"Down"	2021	A.C.E	Down: Single
"Shanti"	2024	Zedd	Telos

=== Remixes ===
Track	Year	Artist	Ref.
"Where Are Ü Now" (Grey Remix)	2015	Jack Ü	
"Disarm You" (Grey Remix)	2015	Kaskade	
"Beautiful Now" (Grey Remix)	2015	Zedd	
"Papercut" (Grey Remix)	2015	Zedd	
"Same Old Love" (Grey Remix)	2015	Selena Gomez	
"Wild" (Lophiile and Grey Remix)	2016	Troye Sivan	
"True Colors" (Grey Remix)	2016	Zedd	
"You're Not There" (Grey Remix)	2017	Lukas Graham	
"In The Arms Of A Stranger" (Grey Remix)	2017	Mike Posner	
"Do You Remember" (Grey Remix)	2017	Jarryd James	
"Fresh Eyes" (Grey Remix)	2017	Andy Grammer	
"One More Night" (Grey Remix)	2017	End of the World	
"Into You" (Grey Remix)	2017	Ariana Grande	

== Songwriting and production credits ==
Title	Year	Artist(s)	Album	Contributed Member(s)	Credits	Written with	Produced with
"Candyman" (featuring Aloe Blacc)	2016	Zedd	Non-album single	Kyle Trewartha, Michael Trewartha	Producer	-	Zedd, Joseph Trapanese
"Home Alone"	2016	Ansel Elgort	Non-album single	Kyle Trewartha	Co-writer	Ansel Elgort, Tom Norris, Julia Michaels	-
"Thief"	2017	Ansel Elgort	Non-album single	Kyle Trewartha	Co-writer	Ansel Elgort, Tom Norris, Christopher J. Baran	-
"Changed My Mind"	2018	Tove Styrke	Sway	Kyle Trewartha, Michael Trewartha	Co-writer	Tove Styrke, Elof Loelv, Linnéa Södahl, Kathryn Ostenburg	-

== Awards and nominations ==
Year	Award	Category	Nominated Work	Result	Reference
2018	American Music Awards	Collaboration of the Year	"The Middle" (with Zedd and Maren Morris)	Nominated	
2018	iHeartRadio Titanium Award	1 Billion Total Audience Spins on iHeartRadio Stations	"The Middle" (with Zedd and Maren Morris)	Won	
2019	Grammy Awards	Record of the Year	"The Middle" (with Zedd and Maren Morris)	Nominated	
2019	Grammy Awards	Song of the Year	"The Middle" (with Zedd and Maren Morris)	Nominated	
2019	Grammy Awards	Best Pop Duo/Group Performance	"The Middle" (with Zedd and Maren Morris)	Nominated	
2019	iHeart Radio Music Awards	Song of the Year	"The Middle" (with Zedd and Maren Morris)	Won	
2019	iHeart Radio Music Awards	Best Collaboration	"The Middle" (with Zedd and Maren Morris)	Nominated	
2019	iHeart Radio Music Awards	Dance Song of the Year	"The Middle" (with Zedd and Maren Morris)	Won	
