= True Colors (Zedd song) =

2015 song by Zedd; 2016 single by Zedd and Kesha

Song by Zedd featuring Tim James

from the album True Colors
- Recorded: 2015
- Length: 3:48
- Label: Interscope; Kemosabe; RCA
- Songwriters: Anton Zaslavski; Antonina Armato; Tim James
- Producers: Zedd; Rock Mafia

"True Colors" is a song by Russian-German electronic music producer Zedd. The original version of the song featured vocals by American singer Tim James and was included on Zedd's second studio album of the same name (2015).

== Remix ==
On March 8, 2016, DJ duo Grey released their official remix of "True Colors".

== Zedd and Kesha version ==
"True Colors"

Single by Zedd and Kesha

from the album True Colors
- Released: 29 April 2016
- Recorded: 2016
- Genre: Electro; pop
- Length: 3:45
- Label: Interscope; Kemosabe; RCA
- Songwriters: Anton Zaslavski; Antonina Armato; Tim James; Kesha Sebert
- Producers: Zedd; Rock Mafia

Zedd singles chronology
"Candyman" (2016)	"True Colors" (2016)	"Starving" (2016)

Kesha singles chronology
"Timber" (2013)	"True Colors" (2016)	"Praying" (2017)

Audio video
- "True Colors" on YouTube

The official single is a new version of the track with vocals provided by the American singer Kesha and was released as the album's fourth single on April 29, 2016. The song appeared in FIFA 17.

=== Background ===
"True Colors" was Kesha's first music release in over three years, as she had been locked in a court case with her producer Dr. Luke, after ten years of alleged abuse. Along with support from other famous celebrities, Zedd offered to produce a song with her. She first performed the song as a guest during Zedd's set at Coachella 2016. In late April, both Kesha and Zedd posted photos to their social media accounts confirming they were recording together.

=== Composition ===
"True Colors" is a mid-tempo ballad in the key of D minor with a tempo of 126 beats per minute in half-time feel. It follows a chord progression of Dm-C-Gm-Dm. Kesha's vocals span from A_{3} (F_{3} in backing vocals) to D_{5} (F_{5} in backing vocals). The track opens and closes with a muted keyboard melody before gradually building to a climax of rollicking drums and bells, a departure from Kesha's previous "party anthem" singles. According to a NME reviewer, it is "a moody, gothic electro ballad."

=== Reception ===
Rolling Stone editor Brittany Spanos called it a "triumphant return" for Kesha. Comparing it to the album version, she stated "the style is more grandiose" in Kesha's take. Agreeing with the latter, Nigel M. Smith from The Guardian wrote "Kesha's audible rage lends the track a fire that was missing in its earlier incarnation." Lars Brandle of Billboard wrote the song "is a powerful, moody tune and, lyrically, Kesha is in a fighting frame." August Brown in Los Angeles Times noted "At Coachella, her surprise appearance had the gravity of something more than just another pop-star cameo. This recorded version is a welcome reminder of Kesha's considerable vocal talent." Lucas Villa of AXS praised Zedd's direction, writing, "Under Dr. Luke, her vocals were mostly processed to hell but with Zedd, Kesha beautifully bellows the song's powerful message." Despite minimal promotion from radio or a major record label, the song sold 52,000 copies in its first week.

=== Track listing ===
Digital download
No.	Title	Length
1.	"True Colors" (with Kesha)	3:45

=== Charts ===
Weekly chart performance for "True Colors"
Chart (2016)	Peak position
Australia (ARIA)	76
Canada Hot 100 (Billboard)	66
France (SNEP)	191
Ireland (IRMA)	81
UK Singles (Official Charts)	78
US Billboard Hot 100	74
US Dance Club Songs (Billboard)	38

=== Release history ===
Release dates and formats for "True Colors"
Region	Date	Format	Label	Ref.
United States	29 April 2016	Digital download	Interscope; Kemosabe; Polydor; Universal	
Italy	29 April 2016	Contemporary hit radio	Interscope; Kemosabe; Polydor; Universal	
