= Find You (Zedd song) =

Single by Zedd featuring Matthew Koma and Miriam Bryant

from the album Divergent: Original Motion Picture Soundtrack and Clarity (Deluxe)
- Released: 26 January 2014
- Recorded: 2013
- Genre: Electro; dance
- Length: 3:23
- Label: Universal Music Group; Spinnin' Records
- Songwriters: Anton Zaslavski; Matthew Koma; Miriam Bryant; Victor Radstrom
- Producer: Zedd

Zedd singles chronology
"Push Play" (2013)	"Find You" (2014)	"Break Free" (2014)

Matthew Koma singles chronology
"Cannonball" (2013)	"Find You" (2014)	"Wasted" (2014)

Miriam Bryant singles chronology
"Push Play" (2013)	"Find You" (2014)	"Dragon" (2014)

The Divergent Series chronology
Find You (2014)	Beating Heart (2014)

"Find You" is a song by German musician and producer Zedd from the soundtrack to the film Divergent. It was released as the first single from the soundtrack on 26 January 2014.

The song features vocals from Swedish singer Miriam Bryant and American pop singer Matthew Koma, and was written by all three artists alongside Victor Radstrom, a frequent collaborator of Bryant. A lyric video was released on 30 January 2014.

== Composition ==
The song is written in the key of E♭ major, with a tempo of 128 beats per minute and a vocal range from E♭3 to E♭5.

== Music video ==
The music video for "Find You" was uploaded to YouTube on 16 March 2014. The video has approximately 57,286,024 views as of 25 September 2022.

== Track listing ==
Digital download (Spinnin' Records Exclusive)
No.	Title	Length
1.	"Find You" (Extended Mix) (featuring Matthew Koma and Miriam Bryant)	4:11

CD single
No.	Title	Length
1.	"Find You" (featuring Matthew Koma and Miriam Bryant)	3:23

Digital download (Remixes)
No.	Title	Length
1.	"Find You" (Kevin Drew Remix)	4:43
2.	"Find You" (Dash Berlin Remix)	5:00
3.	"Find You" (Tritonal Remix)	4:50
4.	"Find You" (Froxic Remix)	5:51
5.	"Find You" (Syn Cole Remix)	5:05
6.	"Find You" (Dave Aude Remix)	5:22
7.	"Find You" (TYP Remix)	5:19
8.	"Find You" (Mike Hawkins Remix)	4:26

== Charts ==
=== Weekly charts ===
Weekly chart performance
Chart (2014)	Peak position
Australia (ARIA)	68
Belgium (Ultratip Bubbling Under Flanders)	34
Belgium Dance (Ultratop Flanders)	35
Italian Airplay (EarOne)	137
Slovenia (SloTop50)	43
South Korea International Songs (GAON)	61
US Bubbling Under Hot 100 (Billboard)	1
US Hot Dance/Electronic Songs (Billboard)	10
US Hot Dance Club Songs (Billboard)	1
US Pop Airplay (Billboard)	34

=== Year-end charts ===
Chart (2014)	Position
US Dance Club Songs (Billboard)	16
US Hot Dance/Electronic Songs (Billboard)	25

== Certifications ==
Region	Certification	Certified units/sales
Australia (ARIA)	Gold	35,000^{‡}
Brazil (Pro-Música Brasil)	Gold	30,000^{‡}
Sweden (GLF)	Gold	20,000^{‡}
United States (RIAA)	Gold	500,000^{‡}
^{‡} Sales+streaming figures based on certification alone.

== Release history ==
Release dates and formats for "Find You"
Region	Date	Format	Label(s)	Ref.
United States	18 February 2014	Mainstream airplay	Interscope	

== See also ==
- List of number-one dance singles of 2014 (U.S.)
