= Zedd =

German DJ and producer (born 1989)

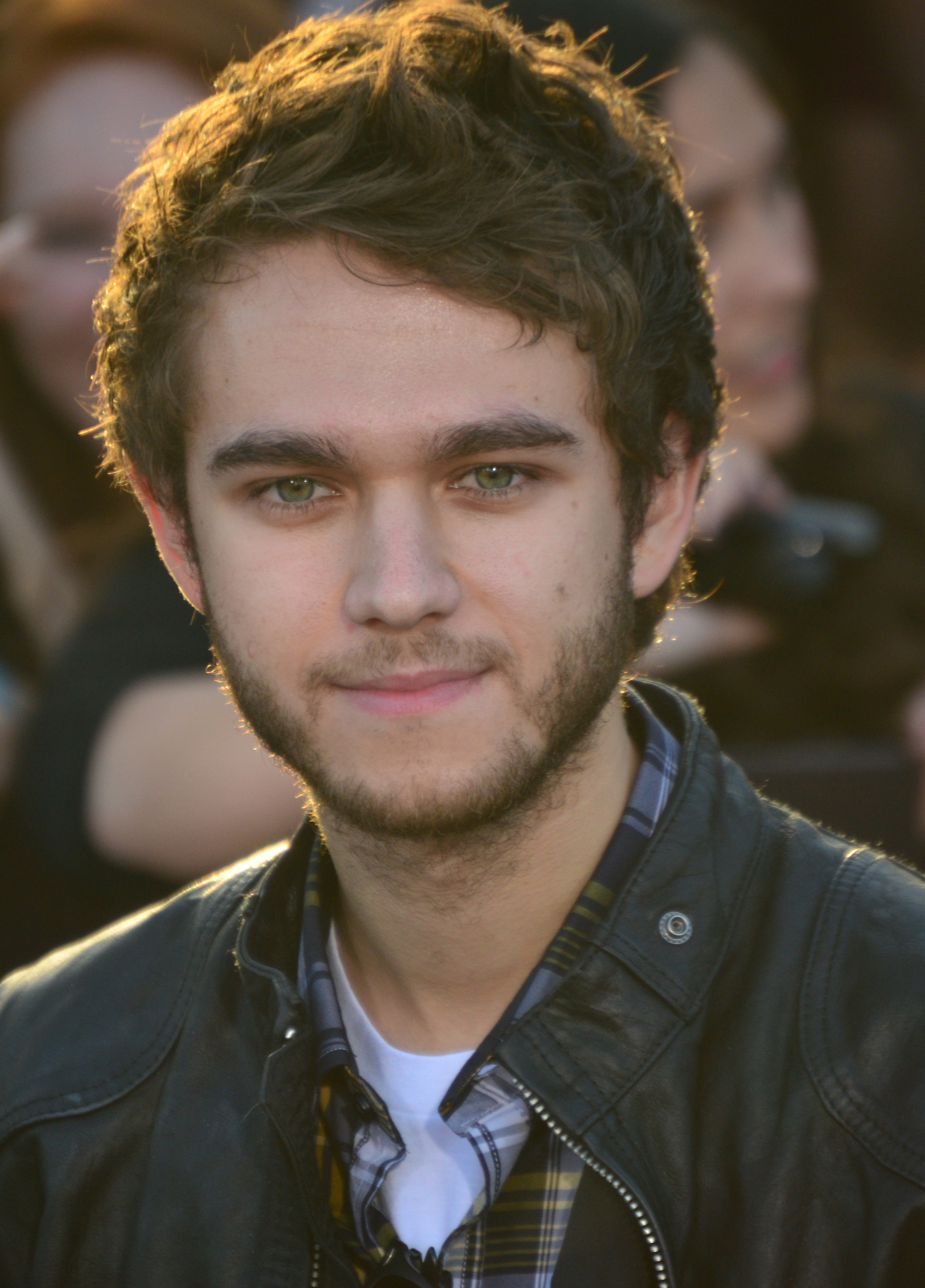
- Zedd in 2014

Background information
- Born: Anton Zaslavski; 2 September 1989 (age 37); Saratov, Russian SFSR, Soviet Union
- Origin: Kaiserslautern, Germany
- Genres: EDM; house
- Occupations: Record producer; disc jockey
- Years active: 2002–present
- Labels: Interscope; Owsla; Spinnin'; Dim Mak
- Website: zedd.net

Anton Zaslavski (Note: Russian: Антон Игоревич Заславский, romanized: Anton Igorevich Zaslavskiy, IPA: [ɐnˈton zɐsˈlafskʲɪj]) (born 2 September 1989), known professionally as Zedd (/zɛd/), is a Russian-Born German record producer and DJ. His stage name was derived from zed, the English pronunciation for the letter Z, the first letter of his surname. Raised in Kaiserslautern, Zedd rose to mainstream success with his 2012 single "Clarity" (featuring Foxes), which peaked at number eight on the Billboard Hot 100 and won Best Dance Recording at the 56th Grammy Awards. It served as the third single for his debut studio album of the same name (2012), of which its deluxe edition spawned the US top 20 single "Stay the Night" (featuring Hayley Williams).

Zedd's second studio album, True Colors (2015), was supported by his third Billboard Hot 100-top 20 single, "I Want You to Know" (featuring Selena Gomez). His 2017 single, "Stay" (with Alessia Cara), peaked at number seven on the chart, while his 2018 single, "The Middle" (with Maren Morris and Grey) peaked at number five. Zedd was featured on Ariana Grande's 2014 single "Break Free", which peaked at number four. He released his third studio album, Telos, on 30 August 2024.

== Early life ==
Anton Zaslavski was born on 2 September 1989 in Saratov, Soviet Union, to a Jewish family. He grew up in Dansenberg, Kaiserslautern, Germany, after his family moved there when Anton was three years old. He reportedly is a classically trained musician, the son of two musicians. His father, Igor Zaslavski, is a guitarist and schoolteacher, and his mother is a piano teacher. He began playing the piano at the age of four and drums at twelve years old. He has an older brother, Arkadi, and a younger half-brother, Daniel. In 2002, Zaslavski joined Dioramic, a German metalcore band co-founded by his brother Arkadi, serving as their drummer; the band was later signed by Lifeforce Records. Zaslavski's interest in producing electronic music was piqued after hearing Cross by the French electronic duo Justice.

== Career ==
=== 2010–2011: Beginnings ===
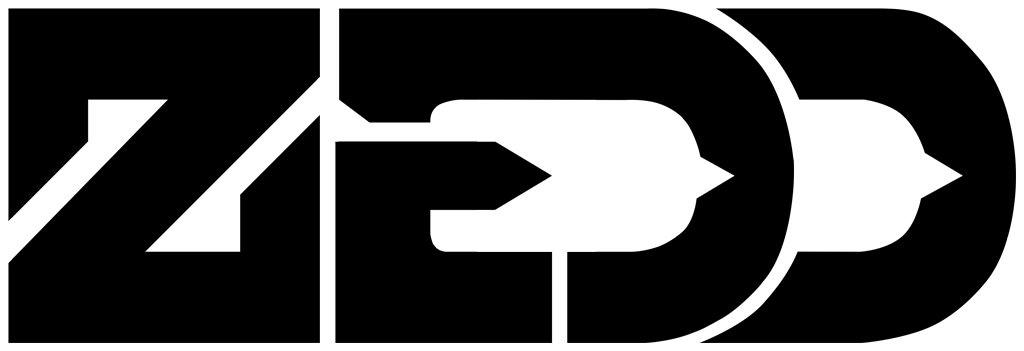
Zedd logo

While still performing with Dioramic, Zaslavski began producing electronic music in 2009. He won two Beatport remix contests in 2010; his first original release, "The Anthem", entered the Beatport Electro house chart in the top 20.

He also remixed Skrillex's "Scary Monsters and Nice Sprites". He has since produced remixes of well-known artists, including Justin Bieber, Lady Gaga, the Black-Eyed Peas, Enhypen, Twice, Madeon, Porter Robinson, Krewella, Galantis, Deadmau5, Blackpink, Periphery and others. Zaslavski creates his music using the Cubase suite of music production applications, and uses plug-ins such as the Sylenth1, Nexus, SynthMaster 2.6, and Omnisphere synthesizers, and the Kontakt sampler.

Zedd's remix of Lady Gaga's track "Born This Way" appeared on the special edition of her third studio album, Born This Way (2011). In 2011, his single "Shave It Up" (then known as "Shave It") became Zedd's first release on Owsla. Zedd went on to release "Slam the Door" and "Shotgun" with OWSLA before departing to release his debut album in 2013.

=== 2012–2014: Clarity ===
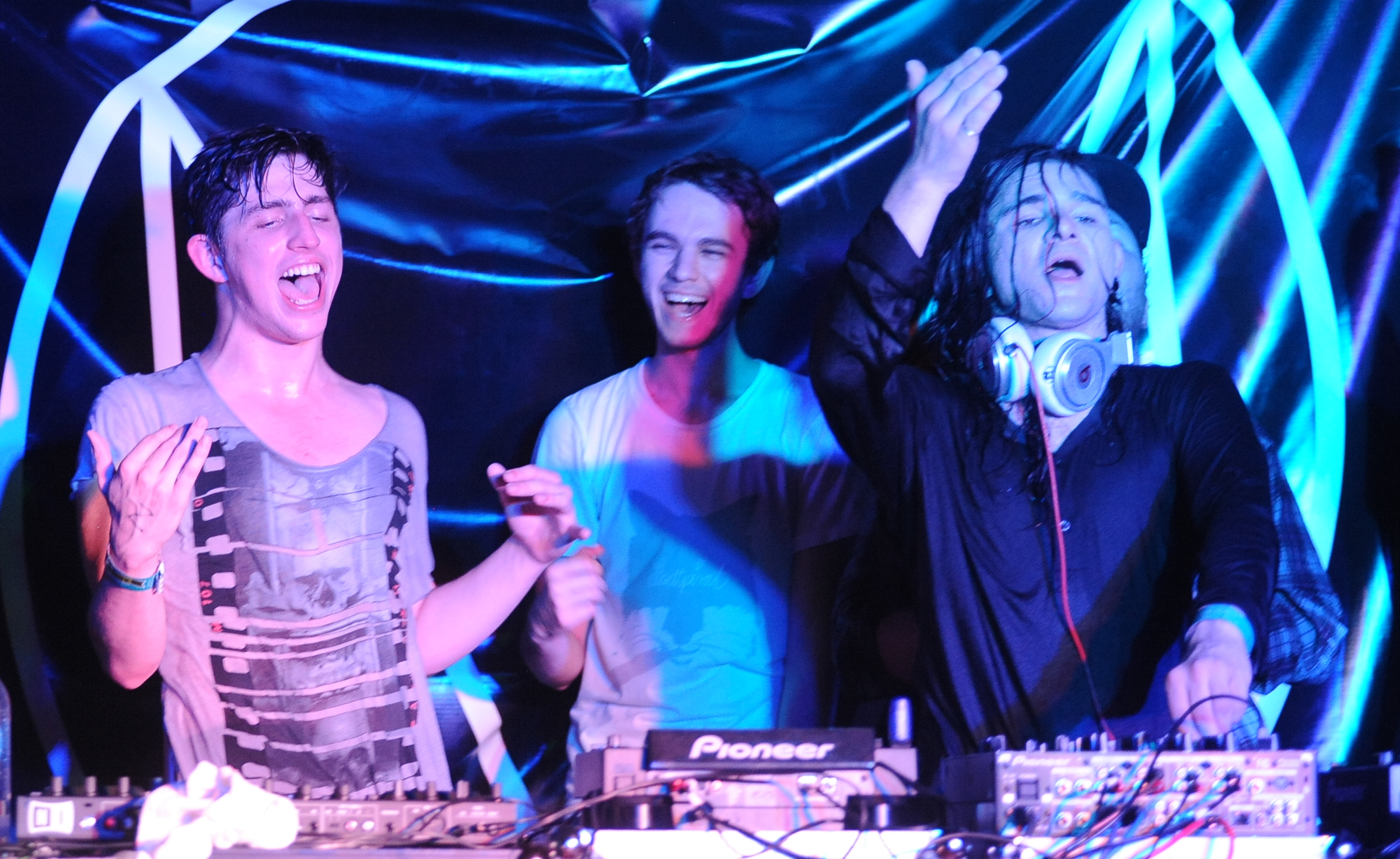
Porter Robinson, Zedd, and Skrillex performing at SXSW on 16 March 2012

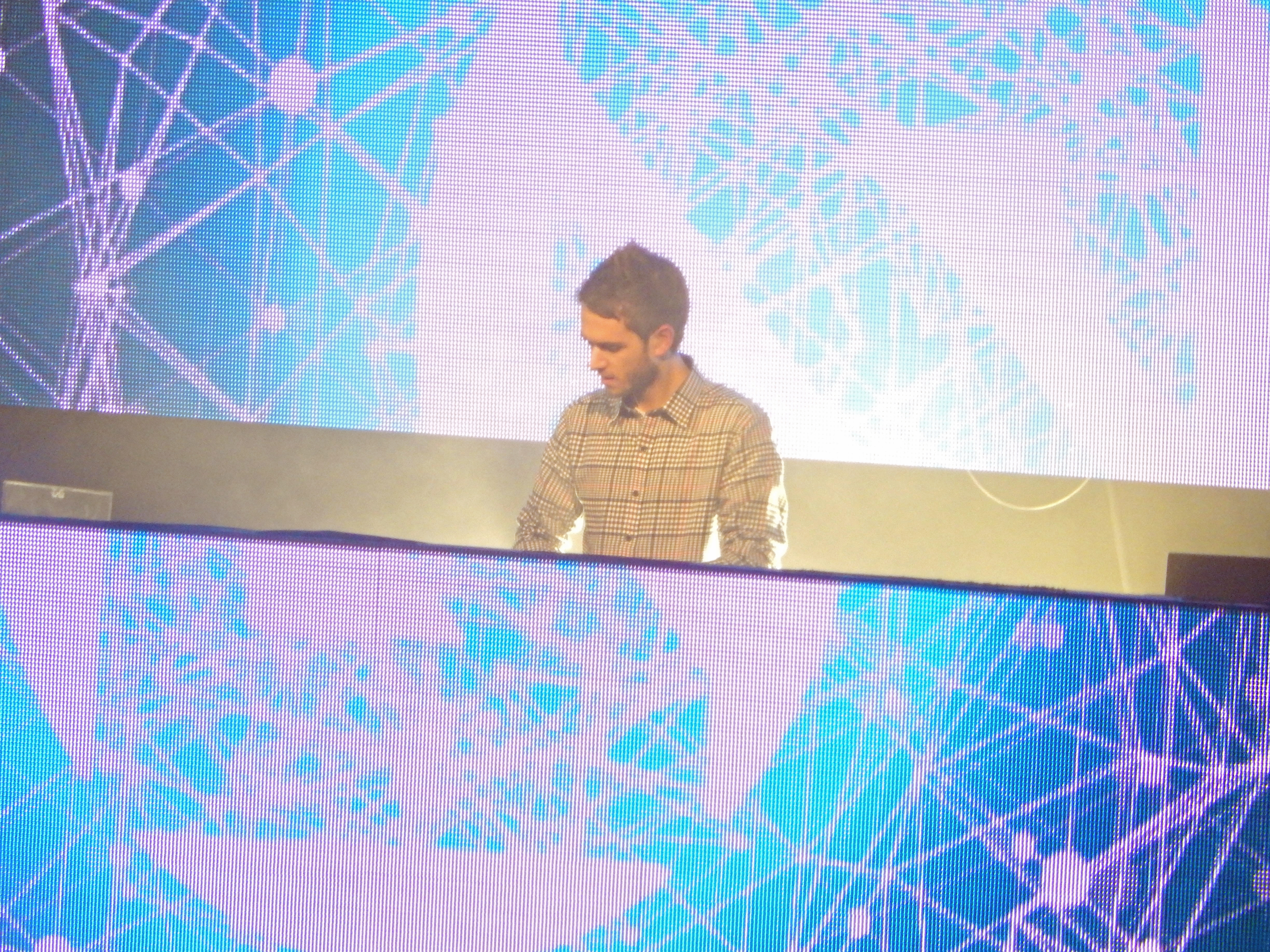
Zedd at 2013 Moment of Clarity World Tour at the Aragon, Chicago

In March 2012, Zaslavski officially left Dioramic due to his burgeoning solo career. Shortly after, he signed with Interscope Records and released his debut single from the label, "Spectrum", with lyrics and vocals by Matthew Koma. It shot to the top of Billboard's Hot Dance Club Songs. He then produced the Eva Simons song, "I Don't Like You", which was also released on Interscope. He also produced and co-wrote the third single "Beauty and a Beat" with Max Martin for Justin Bieber's third studio album, Believe.

On 12 October 2012, Zedd released his debut studio album Clarity, with "Shave It" as the album's first single and "Spectrum" as its second single. The album's title track, featuring British singer-songwriter Foxes, was released on 1 February 2013 as its third single. It charted in the top 10 of Billboard Hot 100, sold 2,238,000 copies, and was certified platinum, making it Zedd's most successful single to date. The song also became the No. 1 most played on American radio on 10 September 2013. Zedd concluded 2013 with his first worldwide tour, selling out venues across 5 continents. Years later, Matthew Koma claimed that he was not given proper credit for his contributions to the songs "Clarity" and "Spectrum". Koma alleged that his role was downplayed, particularly by Zedd, whom he described as "toxic." Koma also said he brought Foxes to the project. Zedd responded in an open statement, expressing deep hurt and noting that he had always credited Koma in the official registries, while regretting that Koma felt undervalued.

Zedd worked with Japanese singer Namie Amuro and produced her promotional single, "Heaven" for her album Feel. Zedd would later work with her again in 2015 for her album, genic, although none of his songs were actually featured on the album.

"Stay the Night", featuring Hayley Williams, was released as a single on 10 September 2013, as part of the deluxe version of Zedd's album. The song met similar success, although it was criticized for its lack of uniqueness and less powerful lyrics compared to "Clarity". It ranked in Billboard Hot 100's top 20, and certified platinum as well. In 2013, Zedd produced "Aura", "G.U.Y.", and "Donatella" on Lady Gaga's 2013 album, Artpop. On 26 January 2014, he released the single "Find You" featuring Matthew Koma and Miriam Bryant, which is included on the soundtrack for the film Divergent.

On 3 July 2014, Ariana Grande released a song with Zedd entitled "Break Free", which peaked at No. 4 on the Billboard Hot 100 and peaked at No. 1 on the Hot Dance/Electronic Songs. The song was nominated at the Teen Choice Awards in the category of "Break-Up Song". On 18 December 2014, Moment of Clarity, a documentary about Zedd and his 2013 world tour, was released through his YouTube channel, featuring guest appearances by Skrillex, Deadmau5, Hayley Williams, and Dillon Francis.

=== 2015–2016: True Colors ===
After taking a six-month break, Zedd announced the release of his second studio album, True Colors. On 23 February 2015, Zedd released his collaboration featuring Selena Gomez, "I Want You to Know". The song was co-written by Zedd, Ryan Tedder of OneRepublic, and Kevin Drew, and produced by the former. The song was nominated for "Choice Party Song" at the Teen Choice Awards and made it to No. 1 on Billboard's Dance/Electronic Songs and peaked at number 17 on Billboard Hot 100. The song was certified platinum in the US for selling over one million copies.

Zedd released his second single, "Beautiful Now" featuring Jon Bellion, on 13 May 2015. The album, True Colors, was released two days later. The album peaked at number 1 on Billboard's Dance/Electronic Albums, and has ranked at other various international charts. The third single from the album, "Papercut", featuring Troye Sivan, was released on 17 July 2015. On 22–23 May, he headlined the Counter Point Music and Arts Festival along with The Roots and Widespread Panic. Along with Eric Prydz, Zedd headlined the first day of 2015 Spring Awakening Festival.

Zedd performed at the 2015 CMT Music Awards with Lady Antebellum. Together, they performed mashup of their songs "Long Stretch of Love" and "Beautiful Now." His second world tour, the True Colors Tour, ran from August to November 2015 and visited Asia, North America and Europe. Zedd was included in the line-up for Coachella 2016. On 26 February 2016, Zedd released the single "Candyman" alongside Aloe Blacc. On 15 July 2016, singer Hailee Steinfeld and producer duo Grey released a song featuring Zedd titled "Starving", which peaked at No. 5 on the Billboard Mainstream Top 40 and No. 5 on the UK Singles Chart.

Zedd released a collaboration with Riot Games for the 2016 League of Legends eSports championship, Worlds, titled "Ignite" on 26 September 2016. He followed up the release of the song with a "Finals Remix" a month later. On 15 December 2016, Zedd released a remix of DJ Snake's hit song "Let Me Love You".

=== 2017–2023: Collaborations and singles ===
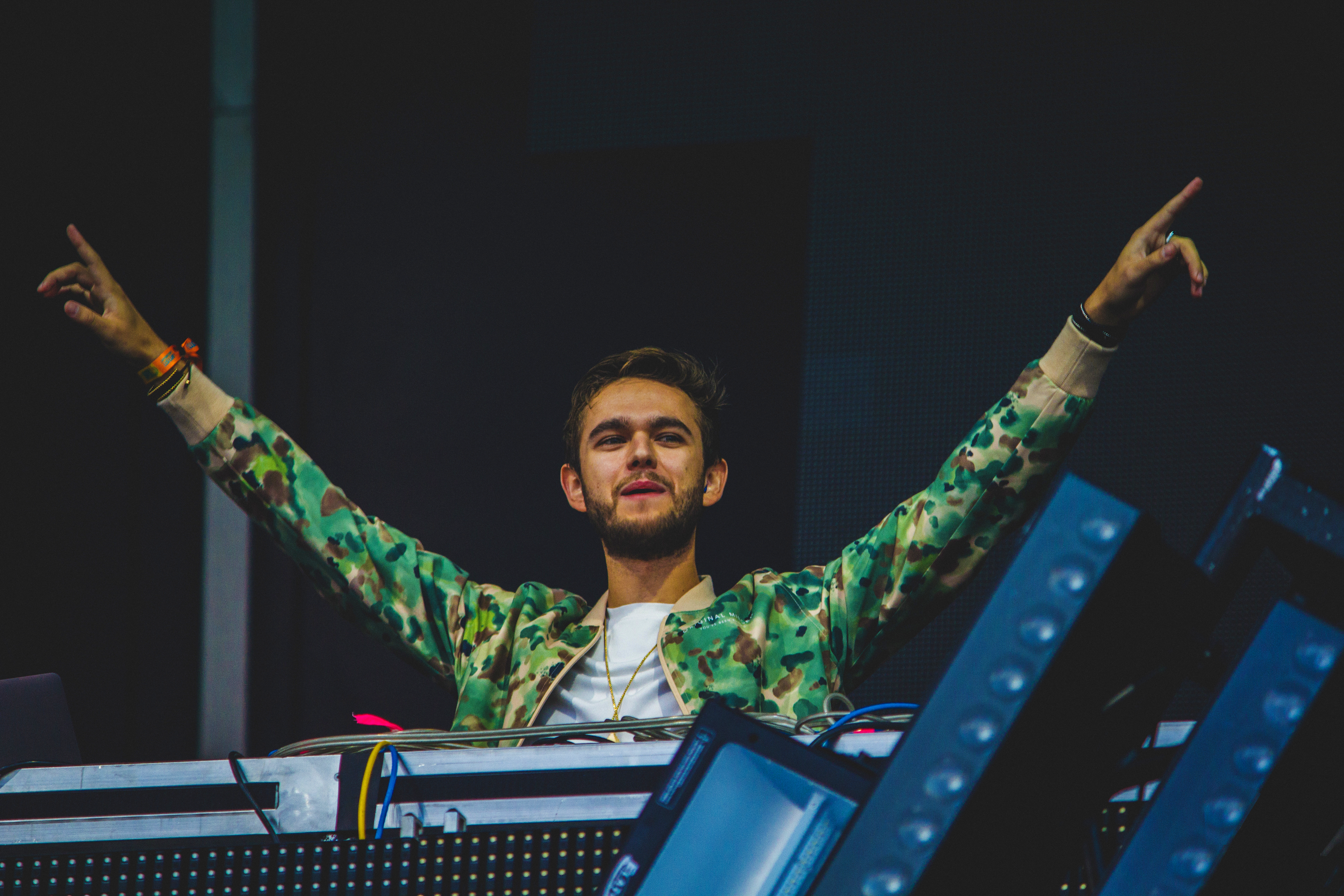
Zedd performing at the 2017 VELD Music Festival

In 2017, Zedd organized "Welcome!", a benefit concert for the American Civil Liberties Union (ACLU), prompted in response to US President Donald Trump's executive order suspending refugee admissions and blocking citizens of seven Muslim-majority countries. The lineup featured Daya, Halsey, Macklemore, Tinashe, and Skrillex. That same year, Zedd released "Stay" with Alessia Cara, which debuted at number 28 on the Billboard Hot 100 and number 33 on the UK Singles Chart. On 6 July 2017, he released the single "Get Low" with Liam Payne.

In January 2018, Zedd released "The Middle" with Maren Morris and Grey, which rose to number one on the Billboard Pop Songs radio chart and peaked at number five on the Billboard Hot 100. This success earned him a number seven ranking on Billboard's 2018 Billboard Dance 100 ranking of dance musicians. He was subsequently tapped by National Geographic to compose a song inspired by the documentary series One Strange Rock, releasing an accompanying video on his YouTube channel on 9 April 2018. On 17 July 2018, Zedd released "Happy Now" with Elley Duhé, with its accompanying music video debuting on 23 August 2018.

On 27 September 2018, Zedd released his remix of the Shawn Mendes single "Lost in Japan", which served as the first collaboration between the two artists and quickly rose onto the Top 40 charts. They performed the track live at the 2018 American Music Awards on 10 October 2018 and again at the Victoria's Secret Fashion Show on 8 November 2018, with the music video released the following day on 9 November. Zedd then collaborated with Katy Perry on the single "365", released on 14 February 2019 along with its music video. During his main stage set at Coachella on 21 April 2019, Zedd brought out Perry, Alessia Cara, and Maren Morris as guests. On 1 May 2019, he announced the fall Orbit Tour alongside support acts NOTD and Jax Jones. Zedd also co-wrote and produced Perry's single "Never Really Over", released on 31 May 2019, which debuted at number 15 on the US Billboard Hot 100. Later that year, on 27 September 2019, Zedd released the single "Good Thing" with Kehlani.

In October 2019, Zedd announced on Twitter that he had been permanently banned from China after liking a tweet related to the animated series South Park, which had been banned in the country several days prior as a result of the episode "Band in China". This restriction seemingly only applied to live performances, however, as much of his music remained accessible within the country.

Zedd continued releasing collaborative singles over the next two years, including "Funny" with Jasmine Thompson on 16 July 2020, and "Inside Out" with Griff on 23 October 2020, both accompanied by music videos. In April 2021, it was revealed that Zedd would launch a residency at Las Vegas's new Zouk Nightclub alongside Tiësto, with each receiving US$250,000 per gig; his initial performance took place on 3 July 2021. Later that month, on 13 August 2021, Zedd performed at Musikfest, supported by opening acts Gabi DeMartino and Dot. On 7 September 2021, the video game Valorant announced a cosmetic weapons collaboration with Zedd, featuring exclusive sound effects and custom tunes. He then collaborated with English electronic duo Disclosure to release the song "You've Got to Let Go If You Want to Be Free" on 28 January 2022. On 20 May 2022, Zedd performed a live-streamed set at the Electric Daisy Carnival (EDC) Las Vegas. Later that year, on 12 August 2022, Zedd entered into a commercial partnership with computer peripherals company HyperX, officially becoming its "Global Brand Ambassador".

=== 2024–present: Telos, Dragon Ball Daima, and "Zedd in the Park" expansion ===
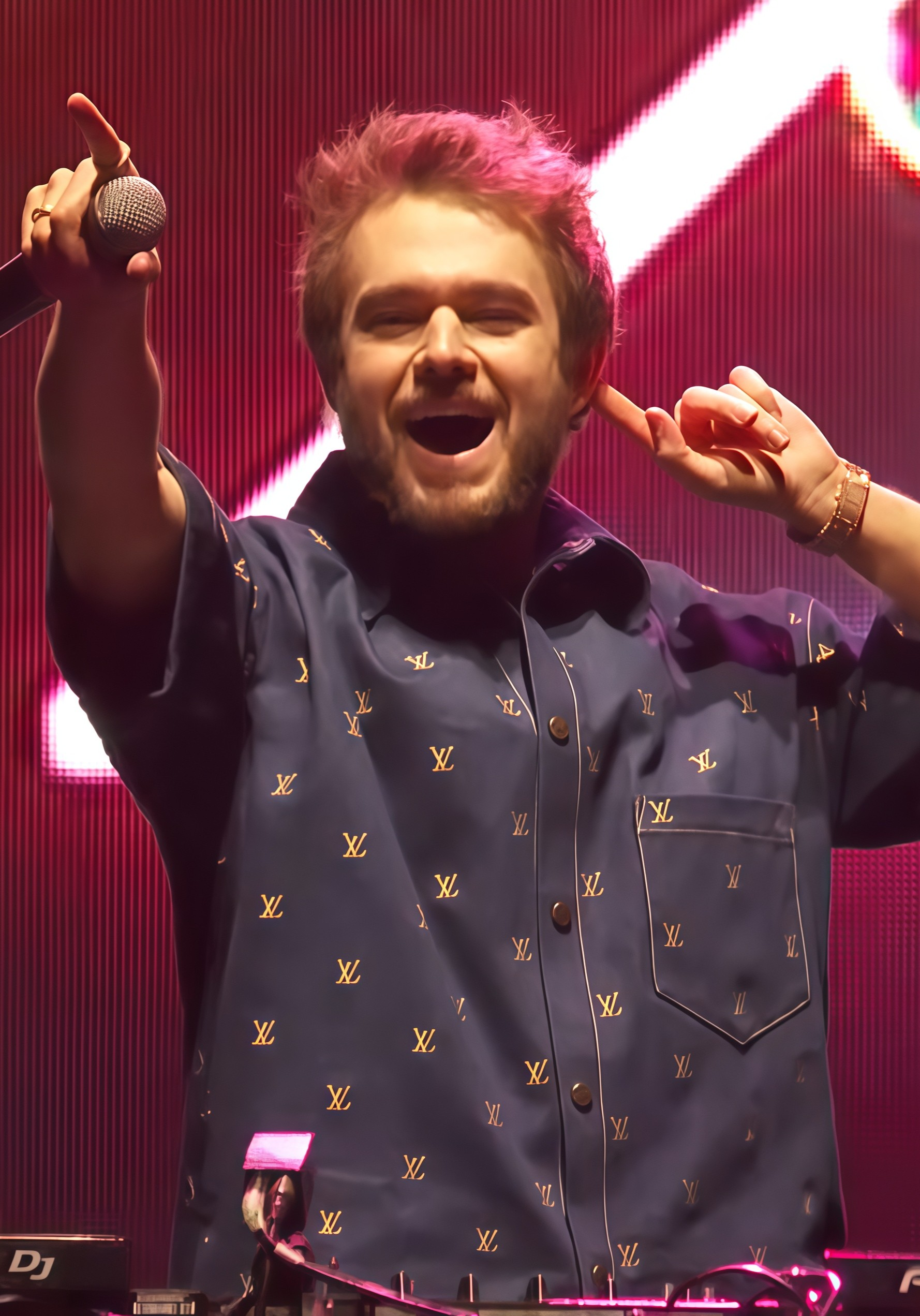
Zedd at the AT&T Block Party, 2024

Nine years after releasing True Colors, Zedd released his third studio album, Telos, on 30 August 2024. The album marked a shift towards a more organic and diverse sound, featuring notable collaborations with John Mayer ("Automatic Yes"), rock band Muse ("1685"), and posthumous vocals from Jeff Buckley ("Dream Brother"). Zedd also announced the accompanying Telos Tour. On 21 June, Zedd released "Out of Time", featuring Bea Miller, as the first single from the album.

In September 2024, he performed "No Gravity" with Bava (musician) to a sold-out audience in Los Angeles, which was later officially released as a single in November 2024. Telos earned Zedd a nomination for Best Dance/Electronic Album at the 67th Annual Grammy Awards in February 2025.

Zedd collaborated with the Japanese vocal duo C & K to perform "Jaka Jaan" (ジャカ☆ジャ〜ン, Jaka Jān), the opening theme song of the 2024 anime series Dragon Ball Daima. He was offered the job of composing the song as he is an open fan of the Dragon Ball franchise, while the lyrics are written by Yukinojo Mori. Zedd also produced the show's ending theme, "Nakama", featuring Japanese-American singer Ai, who wrote the lyrics. "Nakama" was officially released as a single on 14 February 2025.

In April 2026, Zedd announced the fifth edition of his namesake festival, "Zedd in the Park". For the first time, the event expanded to the East Coast, scheduled to take place at Randall's Island in New York City on 14–15 August 2026, with a lineup featuring DJ Snake, Porter Robinson, Madeon, and a back-to-back set with Knock2.

== Personal life ==
Zedd briefly dated singer and actress Selena Gomez in 2015. He revealed that he hated the media attention surrounding it.

Zedd is a fan of the German football club 1. FC Kaiserslautern.

=== Political views ===
Zedd said in 2020, "I personally am not on the left and I’m not on the right. I’m quite straight down the middle. Some of the people I look up to call it 'radical center.'"

Zedd has been critical of President Donald Trump. He stated in February 2016 that he would "move back to Germany" if Trump won the 2016 United States presidential election.

Zedd endorsed Bernie Sanders in the 2020 United States presidential election. He later said, "To me, while Biden was certainly not my first choice, I am quite happy with him as long as we don’t have to live through four more years of the embarrassment that is Trump. But at the end of the day, I can’t stop but think: We live in a country with 350 million people and this is what we have to choose between? This is really the top of the crop? Our best options? It is quite a depressing thought to me."

== Discography ==
- Clarity (2012)
- True Colors (2015)
- Telos (2024)

== Awards and nominations ==
=== American Music Awards ===
Year	Recipient	Category	Result
2013	Zedd	Favorite Electronic Dance Music Artist	Nominated
2015	Zedd	Favorite Electronic Dance Music Artist	Nominated
2015	Zedd	Favorite Electronic Dance Music Artist	Nominated
2018	Zedd	Favorite Electronic Dance Music Artist	Nominated
2018	"The Middle" (ft. Maren Morris & Grey)	Collaboration of the Year	Nominated

=== APRA Music Awards ===
Year	Recipient	Category	Result
2019	"The Middle" (ft. Maren Morris & Grey)	Dance Work of the Year	Won
2019	"The Middle" (ft. Maren Morris & Grey)	Most Played Australian Work	Won

=== Billboard Music Awards ===
Year	Recipient	Category	Result
2014	"Clarity" (ft. Foxes)	Top Dance/Electronic Song	Nominated
2014	Clarity	Top Dance/Electronic Album	Nominated
2014	Zedd	Top Dance/Electronic Artist	Nominated
2015	"Break Free" (ft. Ariana Grande)	Top Dance/Electronic Song	Nominated
2016	True Colors	Top Dance/Electronic Album	Won
2016	Zedd	Top Dance/Electronic Artist	Nominated
2018	"Stay" (ft. Alessia Cara)	Top Dance/Electronic Song	Nominated
2019	"The Middle" (ft. Maren Morris & Grey)	Top Radio Song	Nominated
2019	"The Middle" (ft. Maren Morris & Grey)	Top Dance/Electronic Song	Won

=== DJ Awards ===
Year	Recipient	Category	Result
2014	Zedd	Best Electro DJ	Nominated

=== Grammy Awards ===
Year	Recipient	Category	Result
2014	"Clarity" (ft. Foxes)	Best Dance Recording	Won
2017	"Stay" (ft. Alessia Cara)	Best Pop Duo/Group Performance	Nominated
2018	"The Middle" (ft. Maren Morris & Grey)	Record of the Year	Nominated
2018	"The Middle" (ft. Maren Morris & Grey)	Song of the Year	Nominated
2018	"The Middle" (ft. Maren Morris & Grey)	Best Pop Duo/Group Performance	Nominated
2025	"Telos"	Best Dance/Electronic Album	Nominated

=== iHeartRadio Music Awards ===
Year	Recipient	Category	Result
2014	"Stay the Night" (ft. Hayley Williams)	EDM Song of the Year	Nominated
2016	Zedd	Dance Artist of the Year	Nominated
2018	"Stay" (ft. Alessia Cara)	Dance Song of the Year	Won
2018	"Stay" (ft. Alessia Cara)	Best Collaboration	Nominated
2018	Zedd	Dance Artist of the Year	Nominated
2019	"The Middle" (ft. Maren Morris & Grey)	Song of the Year	Won
2019	"The Middle" (ft. Maren Morris & Grey)	Dance Song of the Year	Won
2019	"The Middle" (ft. Maren Morris & Grey)	Best Collaboration	Nominated
2019	Zedd	Dance Artist of the Year	Nominated

=== iHeartRadio Titanium Awards ===
iHeartRadio Titanium Awards are awarded to an artist when their song reaches 1 Billion Spins across iHeartRadio Stations.

Year	Recipient		Result
2017	"Stay" (ft Alessia Cara)	1 Billion Total Audience Spins on iHeartRadio Stations	Won
2018	"The Middle" (ft Maren Morris & Grey)	1 Billion Total Audience Spins on iHeartRadio Stations	Won

=== MTV Europe Music Awards ===
Year	Recipient	Category	Result
2014	Zedd	Best Push Act	Nominated

=== MTV Video Music Awards ===
Year	Recipient	Category	Result
2013	"Clarity" (ft. Foxes)	Artist To Watch	Nominated
2014	"Stay the Night" (ft. Hayley Williams)	MTV Clubland Award	Won
2014	"Stay the Night" (ft. Hayley Williams)	Best Editing	Nominated
2017	"Stay" (ft. Alessia Cara)	Best Dance	Won
2019	"Get Low" (ft. Liam Payne)	Best Dance	Nominated

=== Much Music Video Awards ===
Year	Recipient	Category	Result
2018	"The Middle" (ft. Maren Morris & Grey)	Best Collaboration	Nominated
2018	"The Middle" (ft. Maren Morris & Grey)	Song of the Summer	Nominated
2018	Zedd	Best EDM/Dance Artist or Group	Nominated

=== Radio Disney Music Awards ===
Year	Recipient	Category	Result
2014	"Clarity" (ft. Foxes)	Best Musical Collaboration	Nominated
2017	"Starving" (ft. Hailee Steinfeld & Grey)	Best Crush Song	Nominated
2018	"The Middle" (ft. Maren Morris & Grey)	Song of the Year	Nominated
2018	"The Middle" (ft. Maren Morris & Grey)	Best Dance Track	Nominated
2018	"The Middle" (ft. Maren Morris & Grey)	Best Collaboration	Nominated

=== Teen Choice Awards ===
Year	Recipient	Category	Result
2014	Zedd	Choice Music – Electronic Dance Music Artist	Nominated
2014	"Break Free" (ft. Ariana Grande)	Choice Music: Break-Up Song	Nominated
2015	"I Want You to Know" (ft. Selena Gomez)	Choice Music: Party Song	Nominated
2015	"I Want You to Know" (ft. Selena Gomez)	Choice Theme Song	Won
2017	"Stay" (ft. Alessia Cara)	Choice Music Collaboration	Nominated
2017	"Stay" (ft. Alessia Cara)	Choice Pop Song	Nominated
2017	"Stay" (ft. Alessia Cara)	Choice Summer Song	Nominated
2017	Zedd	Choice Electronic/Dance Artist	Nominated
2017	Zedd	Choice Summer Male Artist	Nominated
2018	"The Middle" (ft. Maren Morris & Grey)	Choice Music Collaboration	Nominated
2018	"The Middle" (ft. Maren Morris & Grey)	Choice Electronic/Dance Song	Nominated
2018	Zedd	Choice Electronic/Dance Artist	Nominated
2019	"365" (ft. Katy Perry)	Choice Electronic/Dance Song	Nominated

== Tours and concerts ==
=== Headlining ===
- Moment of Clarity Tour (2013)
- True Colors Tour (2015)
- Echo Tour (2017–2018)
- Orbit Tour (2019)
- Palm Tree Festival Hawaii (2024)
- Telos Tour (2024)

=== Residency ===
- Hakkasan Nightclub in Las Vegas (2017–2021)
- OMNIA Nightclub in Las Vegas (2017–2021)
- Wet Republic in Las Vegas (2017–2021)
- Zouk Nightclub in Las Vegas (2021–present)

=== Supporting ===
- Meowingtons Hax Tour (Deadmau5, 2011)
- Born This Way Ball (Lady Gaga, 2012, Asia Leg)
- Witness: The Tour (Katy Perry, 2018, Brisbane, Sydney, and Auckland)

=== Guest appearance ===
- Linkin Park and Friends – Celebrate Life in Honor of Chester Bennington (2017) – drums on "Crawling"
