= Good for You (Selena Gomez song) =

2015 single by Selena Gomez featuring ASAP Rocky

Single by Selena Gomez featuring ASAP Rocky

from the album Revival
- Released: June 22, 2015
- Recorded: January 2015
- Studio: Interscope Studios; (Santa Monica, California); Downtown Studios; (New York City, New York)
- Genre: Pop; electro-R&B
- Length: 3:41
- Label: Interscope
- Songwriters: Julia Michaels; Justin Tranter; Nick Monson; Nolan Lambroza; Rakim Mayers; Hector Delgado; Selena Gomez
- Producers: Nick Monson; Sir Nolan

Selena Gomez singles chronology
"I Want You to Know" (2015)	"Good for You" (2015)	"Same Old Love" (2015)

ASAP Rocky singles chronology
"LSD" (2015)	"Good for You" (2015)	"Lovesick" (2016)

Music video
- "Good for You" on YouTube "Good for You" (ft. ASAP Rocky) on YouTube

"Good for You" is the lead single from American singer Selena Gomez's second solo studio album, Revival (2015). It features vocals by American rapper ASAP Rocky. The song was written by Gomez and Rocky themselves, alongside fellow American singers Julia Michaels and Justin Tranter, Hector Delgado, and the song's producers Nick Monson and Nolan Lambroza, the latter producing as "Sir Nolan". The song was recorded in January 2015, at both Interscope Studios, based in Santa Monica, California, and Downtown Studios, based in New York City, New York.

Originally, the track was conceived by the writers in 45 minutes, during a session booked by the latter. Gomez then received the song through the trio's A&R and was entirely involved in its creative session, helping to develop it as a representation of her process of self-realization, her confidence as a young woman, and her feelings of vulnerability. After it was reworked by Lambroza, she sent the song to Rocky, who added new instruments and co-produced it with his frequent collaborator Hector Delgado, who was in charge of Rocky's vocal production.

After anticipation by Gomez, "Good for You" was digitally released on June 22, 2015 by Interscope and Polydor Records, serving as Revival's lead single as well as the first song by Gomez to be released through those labels. A torch song, it is a pop and electro-R&B slow jam with hip hop elements that comprises a mellow, low-key snap-drop hip hop beat reminiscent of modern, pitched-down Southern hip hop productions, minor sound bursts, percussion instrumentation, drum machines, airy and transparent synthesizer, and a minimalistic bass. Gomez sings atypically with breathy vocals and a plaintive timbre in the track, which was noted for being her first collaboration with a rapper. Its come-hither lyrics have intensity, psychodrama, self-confidence, and female empowerment as main themes, dealing with pleasing her lover and being the perfect complement for him. Rocky raps his verse at the end of the song, which is written from a male, player perspective and features braggadocio, profanity, and sexual innuendos.

"Good for You" received acclaim from music critics, who praised its minimalistic production, sex appeal and Gomez's vocals, as well as her maturity and artistic growth; some of them, however, had mixed reactions towards Rocky's contribution. Reviewers also compared her vocals to those of Lana Del Rey, Imogen Heap and Lorde, while noting similarities to the works of Del Rey; it was later included in many year-end lists of best songs. Commercially, the song reached the top twenty of countries as Australia, Austria, Canada, Denmark, France, New Zealand, and Spain, as well as Czech Republic and Slovakia's digital charts. In the United States, it debuted at number nine on the Billboard Hot 100 and later peaked at number five, becoming her highest-charting single until 2019 when "Lose You to Love Me" topped the chart, as well reaching Pop Songs' summit, where it became her first song to do so.

Its accompanying music video was directed by Sophie Muller and premiered on Times Square screens on June 26, 2015. The project uses a new and slower version of the song, which omits Rocky's verse and features string instrumentation. Highlighted for its provocative imagery, it follows a low-key premise with Gomez wallowing on several vignettes wearing a number of casual outfits. A second version was later released using the explicit edition of the track and features Rocky rapping his verse with Gomez's scenes and dynamic visuals in the background; new shots also are present in this version. Both videos received positive feedback from critics, who praised Gomez's sensuality and the growth in her artistic imagery, describing the first as her "most intimate" to date and comparing it to Del Rey's works. To promote "Good for You", Gomez made interviews for radios and a few live performances in shows as Today and Taylor Swift's The 1989 World Tour (2015), where she made its first live performance and served as a special guest.

== Writing and production ==
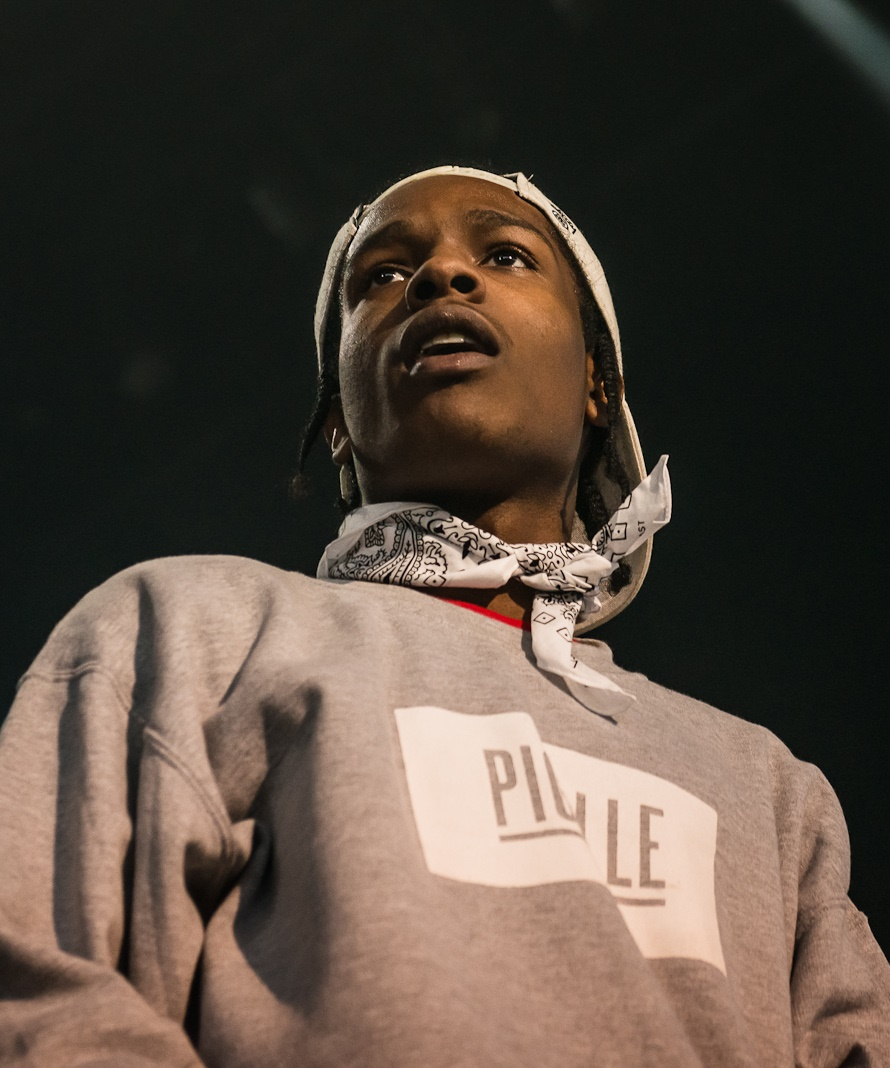
Besides featuring on "Good for You", rapper ASAP Rocky co-produced it with frequent collaborator Hector Delgado using the same production process from his albums.

Nick Monson booked a two-hour session with songwriters Julia Michaels and Justin Tranter to adjust one of their compositions. Finishing the adjustment in 45 minutes, they decided to use the remaining time to write another song so that they would not waste the money for the studio time they paid for. "Good for You" was subsequently written in 45 minutes. It began with Monson playing its bassline and putting a snap on it before Michaels freestyled the opening lyric, "I'm on my 14 carats". Her lyrics were influenced by her boyfriend who told her, "Julia, you never write any happy songs for me. It's kind of sad," to which she responded: "Fine, I'll write a good song about you, shut up!". Tranter's lyrics were inspired by their ex-boyfriend who preferred them to dress femme. Upon hearing "Good for You", the trio's A&R told them that the song should be recorded by Selena Gomez, despite Tranter initially thinking the song was "too indie" for her. The A&R sent the track to Gomez who "freaked out", deeming it the artistic direction she had envisioned for her second studio album, Revival (2015). She described the song as "a piece that was just everything I feel a woman should embody, but not in the obvious way" and explained to iHeartRadio: "I think it just sets the tone perfect for the record just because it's sexy, but not trying too hard. The track and everything kind of does it itself. It's sensual, it reps women in a good way. I think it does something to a woman when they look good".

Described by Gomez as "a beautiful start to the album", "Good for You" was the third song she received since signing with her new label Interscope Records, as well the second track to be recorded for the album. It was uninterruptedly recorded in 45 minutes at Interscope Studios in Santa Monica, California; during the process, Gomez's vocals featured cracks as the song "took on this emotion [she] didn't realize [she] could tap into", and at the beginning of the session she was exhausted from pressurizing herself for a sound and concept for the album. According to her, this recording had no beat and was "just a skeleton of a song". There was also no specific sound planned for the song at the time although it was suggested that its soft melodies be made more pop-indebted which Gomez disagreed with, believing it would take away from her vocal. She was entirely involved in the song's creative direction, providing additional songwriting, and helped to develop it to represent her process of self-realization, her confidence as a young woman, and feelings of vulnerability. The song also formed part of a process in which she wanted to portray her story as an artist and as part of a transitional album over which she would take full control. In an interview for MTV, she said this was her time "to embrace who I am, and I'm not going to sit down in a chair and talk about something that doesn't mean anything to me anymore" and spoke about her involvement in the track: "This is the most I've been creatively involved from the writing process ... every single thing I'm even remotely singing about is something I've related to and something I'm hitting the nail on, and I had to pick what was going to represent the album and who I am as a whole".

The song was then reworked by Nolan Lambroza who increased its tempo. Initially, there was no plan for the song to feature another artist. A fan of hip hop, Gomez felt constrained from incorporating the genre and collaborating with rappers on her previous releases due to her age and young fanbase. However, for her second album, she reconsidered. Also a fan of R&B, Gomez noticed that "Good for You" shared similarities to the genres, specifically in tempo and felt that it was the sound the song should have. At the time, she was also a fan of rapper ASAP Rocky's 2015 album At. Long. Last. ASAP — whose love she cited as "influent" [sic] in her decision to collaborate with him —, and thought "Good for You" had a vibe that was suited to Rocky's music. The rapper's participation happened organically; Gomez texted Rocky and sent him the song after receiving his contact details through Lambroza and her management. Rocky responded positively, having "literally loved" it and recording a verse the next day at Downtown Studios in New York City, New York. His vocals were produced by frequent collaborator Hector Delgado. This was the first time Gomez had collaborated with a rapper on one of her tracks. She also insisted that Rocky should experiment with the song beyond a rap verse. Consequently, he and Delgado co-produced it and added beats, instruments, as well additional bass and snares. Although this is a pop song, Rocky still used the same production process from his music. In an interview for MTV News, he explained: "You just go in. Go for the kill. I mean, it wasn't the type of song you try to go into... It was just like me telling her, you sure you wanna go here with me? I gotta change the beat. I gotta talk my shit. My jiggy shit". Talking about Rocky's contribution, Gomez said: "I was totally prepared for a 'No, I'm good, thank you', it was so great and he changed some of the production of the song, which made it better, and I let him have like full-on freedom with everything, it was really fun".

== Release and artwork ==
Originally, "Good for You" was not intended to be the lead single from Revival. Michaels and Tranter thought the song would "never be a single in a million years", and was better suited as an album track, though Gomez insisted: "Nope, this is my first single, motherfucker". Interscope CEO John Janick also questioned its strength as a lead single, as well as Gomez's collaboration with Rocky, which he felt may be perceived as odd. Gomez did not want the lead single to be "the obvious, huge song", and instead wanted it to set the tone for Revival and a new phase in her artistry. In an interview for iHeartRadio, she explained: "I have become more comfortable with my sexuality, and who I am, and my body, and I feel really proud of that. That's why it was the one to kick off the album". As a result, besides serving as the first single from the album, the song also was the first by Gomez to be released through Interscope and Polydor Records. She created anticipation for its release, posting several teasers in her Instagram account. On June 12, 2015, Gomez announced that the song would be released ten days later.

On June 17, 2015, a radio host from KDND stated that "Good for You" would be featuring ASAP Rocky. On the next day, On June 18, 2015, Gomez posted a short spoken-word snippet which music journalists widely speculated to be the song's intro. In the snippet, Gomez said: "But I'm blinded by the sun. I'm reborn at every moment, so who knows what I'll become?" A heavy bass beat featured for a few seconds before the snippet, in which Gomez captioned, "I feel like I can exhale". According to Christina Garibaldi of MTV News the snippet echoed an earlier statement Gomez made on Instagram where she said her listeners would learn the truth about what she had been experiencing on her upcoming album. On June 20, 2015, the song leaked online. On June 22, 2015, "Good for You" received its radio premiere across all iHeartRadio contemporary hit radio stations at 06:00 EST (11:00 UTC) — which also played the track at the top of every hour in that day —, and was released as a digital download at 00:00 EST (05:00 UTC). The websites of these stations, as well iHeart.com, made it available on-demand. "Good for You" impacted contemporary hit radio in the United States on June 23, 2015, being added to rhythmic contemporary playlists on July 7, 2015. An explicit version of the song was released on August 19, 2015, and a download digital containing three remixes was available for purchase on September 9. On the following 23, the Phanthoms Remix was digitally released.

Gomez revealed the artwork for the single on June 19, 2015. On it, she is seen striking a risqué pose, on a bar stool against a bare wall. Gomez sports a natural look in the artwork; barefoot and wearing only an oversized, thin white T-shirt as she runs her hands through her hair. Jonathan Borge of InStyle opined that the cover art was enough to cause excitement on its own. Eric Diep from Complex said Gomez "slays the cover artwork" and felt it implied her upcoming album would substantiate her maturity as an artist. Idolator's Mike Wass opined that the artwork was a good look for Gomez which manifested maturity, and said that it was "yet another indication that the next phase of her career will come as something of a shock to long-term fans". Laura Beck of Cosmopolitan called the cover art "insanely sexy" and "gorgeous", and added: "All this lady needs to look amazing is a T-shirt and a stool. Impressive". Wass, Corrine Heller of E! and Amanda Bell of MTV News all commended Gomez's sex appeal in the cover art, while other critics complimented the artwork's beauty and simplicity.

== Composition and lyrical interpretation ==
"Good for You"
A 19-second sample of "Good for You" featuring ASAP Rocky's rap verse and Selena Gomez singing the lyrics "I just wanna look good for you, good for you". It is a pop and electro-R&B slow jam with hip hop drum beats, and was noted for being a transition from the primarily pop influences of Gomez's previous releases.

"Good for You" is a pop and electro-R&B slow jam, which contains elements of hip hop in its structure. A dark and restrained record, "Good for You" represents a new sound for Gomez, and a transition from the primarily pop influences of her previous releases. It takes on a more stripped-down, starked, sleek, sad noir and minimalist sound, while also comprising a mellow, low-key snap-drop, hip hop drum beat and a slow, R&B-like chorus. Mikael Wood of the Los Angeles Times wrote, "Rather than jack the tempo, though, Gomez here slows the beat to a woozy crawl that owes something to the pitched-down sound of recent Southern hip hop". Musically, "Good for You" was compared to the works of Lana Del Rey.

The track's ambient, sparse and pitched-down production contains minor sound bursts and finger clicks, comprising percussion instrumentation, drum machines, a transparent and airy synthesizer, and minimalistic bass. Its production was noted to recall Rocky's discography, namely At.Long.Last.A$AP. This song is composed in the common time signature and is played in the key of F minor, with a moderate tempo of 89 beats per minute. It follows a basic sequence of Fm–A♭–B♭–Fm–E♭ as its chord progression, except in the bridge, which has a sequence of C♯m and the lyrics "Trust me, I can take you there / Trust me, I / Trust me, I / Trust me, I", and during Rocky's verse, where the chords of C♯, E♭ and D are repeated in sequence. Gomez solicits a slightly raspy, deliberate, slow and breathy vocal in the song, while making use of mumbling, crooning and cooing techniques, and a plaintive timbre. Her vocal range spans the low note of C_{3} to the high note of B♭_{4}. Her voice was compared to that of Imogen Heap, Lana Del Rey, and Lorde; she clips her enunciation and breaks her vowels on words such as "good" which she phrases as "guh-eeed".

Lyrically, "Good for You" is a torch song and a come-hither with themes of intensity, psychodrama, self-confidence and female self-empowerment, with Gomez singing the hook "I just wanna look good for you, good for you", as a plea. According to Gomez, the track "reps women in a good way" and "does something to a woman when they look good". In an interview for People magazine, she stated: "This song represents the confidence that I truly have inside of me, and I think it's the vulnerable side that I've expressed, but it's also the combination of just feeling myself". It was noted to showcase a shift towards more mature and sexually suggestive subject matter than in Gomez's previous releases. A number of the lyrics attribute syllables as a means of poetry, namely, "leave this dress a mess on the floor" and "syncopate my skin to your heart beating". Gomez's lyrics specifically deal with pleasing and being the perfect complement for her significant other, by means of wearing skin-tight dresses and doing her "hair up real, real nice". Gomez references the Greek myth of Midas and jewelry retailer Tiffany & Co in the lines "Doing it up like Midas, mmm" and "I'm on marquise diamond / I'm a marquise diamond / Could even make that Tiffany jealous, mmm". Gomez's lyrics deal with pleasing her lover and being the perfect complement for him, seen in lyrics as "Gonna wear that dress you like, skin-tight / Do my hair up real, real nice". The line "You say I give it to you hard / So bad, so bad / Make you never wanna leave / I won't / I won't" represents a shift towards more mature and sexually suggestive subject matter than Gomez's previous releases.

A verse rapped by Rocky occurs towards the end of the song. His lyrics are written from a male, player perspective to affirm Gomez's intentions; the verse comprises braggadocio, profanity, and sexual innuendo. Rocky's inclusions were noted to add to the sense of maturity Gomez portrays in the song. Dee Lockett of New York described the track as Gomez's own version of Beyoncé's "Partition" (2014), a "striptease that has her both exploring and enjoying her sexuality", while Rolling Stone's Rob Sheffield deemed it a "deranged obsessive Lana-like torch song about Selena dressing the part to transform herself into the girl of her dreams". Sheffield also said the track contains psychodrama reminiscent of PJ Harvey's "Dress" (1991), and wrote, "A$AP Rocky does the guest rap, but the song has nothing to do with him or any other guy — all Selena cares about is seducing the demon lover she sees in the mirror".

== Critical reception ==
"Good for You" received acclaim from music critics, who described the track as "sexy" and "sultry". Emilee Lindner of MTV News called the song "beautiful" and "hypnotizing", and said it was "the refreshing, juicy watermelon we needed amid the sugary sweet pop tracks battling for Song of Summer status". In her review, she highlighted Gomez's "seductive" vocals and the "sensual poetic vibe" of the lyrics. Lindner also brought attention to the song's production, writing, "Mixed in with an ambiance that'll make you feel like you're floating, there's an undeniable beat driving the jam". Ryan Carey-Mahoney of USA Today said Gomez brought "fire" on the track and opined that its "uncharted new territory" may give her career a "breath of fresh air", complimenting its Midas reference. "Good for You" was also named the publication's "Song of the Week", with writer Brian Mansfield noting the anticipation the song brought for its host album's release. Mark Iraheta of Pigeons & Planes called the song a slow burner. Katherine St. Asaph of Time magazine viewed the track's sad and morose sound as Gomez's strength and noted that her plaintive timbre "sells the song more than any melisma could". Joe Levy of Rolling Stone suggested that the song "may be carving out a role for [Gomez] as a pop torch singer", describing it as "moody and catchy without being obvious". In a review of Revival, another Rolling Stone critic, Brittany Spanos, hailed "Good for You" as "a mold-breaker hit".

Eric Diep of Complex wrote that it showcased "a more matured [Gomez] than her teenage years", while Justin Smith from the same magazine deemed it his favorite song by her adding, "'Good for You' delivers one of the catchiest hooks of Selena Gomez's musical career and solidifies her transition from Disney star to three-dimensional celebrity." Four Billboard writers reviewed the track. Giving it three-and-a-half stars, Jason Lipshutz said Gomez's "PG-13-rated yearning and Rocky's braggadocio never quite align enough to make thematic sense". Columnist Erin Strecker deemed the song "sexy" and "grown-up" and quipped that Gomez was "clearly ready to try something new". Joe Lynch stated that it "finds her sounding like a grown woman (for perhaps the first time ever?)". Chris Martins said the song was "a testament to [Gomez] taking the reins of her career". Carl Williott and Mike Wass of Idolator called it Gomez's "reinvention single", with the latter deducing that she sounded "almost-unrecognizable" on "Good for You". He felt it was a reinvention and growth in her artistry, calling the song a "refreshingly original anthem", and complimenting its "unusually artful balance" of genres. Dave Hanratty from Drowned in Sound described Gomez's growth from "The Heart Wants What It Wants" as "astonishing", calling "Good for You" a "fresh chapter" for Gomez and "the sexiest scorched earth policy you're ever likely to hear". Hanratty also lauded Gomez's vocal command as "nothing short of exceptional", concluding: "'Good for You' excels simply by being a terrifically constructed and presented pop song."

In a negative review, AllMusic's Tim Sendra said the track felt "forced and overdone", adding, "She aims for several kinds of maturity here, but in the process the music suffers". A Rap-Up editor wrote that Gomez "is all grown up and not afraid to show it". Mikael Wood of the Los Angeles Times wrote that the track's hip hop elements recalled Miley Cyrus' "We Can't Stop" (2013), and said: "No one needs reminding of how well that worked to rebrand the former Hannah Montana. Bring on the wrecking ball". Digital Spy's Lewis Corner and Amy Davidson noticed that "'Good for You' allows Selena to delve deeper than she has been allowed to before, but we wouldn't want her to ditch the polished pop gems altogether". Sal Cinquemani from Slant Magazine said that the song's approach to more serious subject matter embodied "a newfound sophistication". Rob Markman of MTV News commended Gomez for "thinking outside of the box" for the song and specifically her collaboration with Rocky: "There are plenty of rappers [she] could've chosen from, we're just happy she picked one who can actually spit", while Emmanuel C.M. of XXL, who praised Rocky's "solid" verse, said that him collaborating with Gomez was a smart decision, noting the track's "lush" production as "right up [his] alley". VH1's Alexa Tietjen thought the track's hook lacked the catchiness of Gomez's previous singles "Come & Get It" (2013) and "The Heart Wants What It Wants" (2014), but described the song as "well-crafted" and its melody equally as "surprising" as Gomez's collaboration with Rocky. Harley Brown of Spin wrote, "Slowness and simplicity work well for Gomez here, leaving room for Rocky's verse to feel like a natural inclusion". Wass found Rocky's rap "a little forced", but "tasteful (by his standards)", while New York's Dee Lockett considered it "lazy".

=== Recognition ===
Rob Sheffield of Rolling Stone placed "Good for You" at number 18 in his mid-year list of "The Best Songs of 2015 So Far", saying, "Somewhere, the late, great Lesley Gore is smiling". In a similar list ranking the 15 best pop songs of same time, Lindner ranked it at number five describing the song as "like you're wading through dark water with just the gleam of a treasure chest underneath". She called it "a truly unique pop song" and concluded, "it's weird enough with a meandering melody, but it still has those repeated words you can sing along with and get stuck in your head". Entertainment Weekly's Kevin O'Donnell placed the song at the sixth position amid the 40 best of 2015, hailing it as "blush-inducing, seductive" and describing the track as "the defining soundtrack for every late-night post-club comedown". Stereogum's Chris DeVille ranked it as sixth best of the year and wrote it "intensifies the smolder" of the "nice lane" in the sound Gomez began with on "The Heart Wants What It Wants".

Ranking it as the nineteenth best of 2015, a Billboard writer opined that "Good for You" attained the mature sound Gomez had been aiming for "for some time", explaining: "Her sultry voice is a perfect match for the come-hither lyrics, and the thumping beat ensures we'll be dancing to this at clubs for quite some time". Placing it at 30th position in a list compiling the 50 best of 2015, Rolling Stone called it "a seductive smile of a song that [won't] leave your head for the rest of the night, or the year". Besides its inclusion in year-end lists, the track was nominated for Choice Summer Song at the 2015 Teen Choice Awards and Song of the Summer at the 2015 MTV Video Music Awards, losing to "Worth It" by Fifth Harmony and 5 Seconds of Summer's "She's Kinda Hot", respectively. "Good for You" was also nominated for Favorite Collaboration at the 2016 Kids' Choice Awards, but lost to "See You Again" by Wiz Khalifa and Charlie Puth.

=== Accolades ===
Year	Awards	Category	Result	Ref.
2015	Teen Choice Awards	Choice Music – Summer Song	Nominated	
2015	MTV Video Music Awards	Song of Summer	Nominated	
2016	Nickelodeon Kids' Choice Awards	Favorite Collaboration	Nominated	
2016	ASCAP Pop Music Awards	Most Performed Songs	Won	

== Commercial performance ==
"As an artist, you never know how people will respond to something you've created and that is very personal to you. I cannot thank enough everyone at all the radio stations and my fans for their support and joining me in this next chapter.

— Gomez talking about the rise of "Good for You" to Pop Songs chart's summit

In the United States, "Good for You" entered the Billboard Hot 100 issued for July 11, 2015, at number nine, marking Gomez's highest career debut and third top-ten single, following "Come & Get It" (2013), "The Heart Wants What It Wants" (2014), and Rocky's second following "Fuckin' Problems" (2012). It became the second song to debut within the chart's top ten in 2015, after Maroon 5's "Sugar"; and was the first top-ten debut by a female artist since Taylor Swift's "Shake It Off" (2014). "Good for You" also debuted at number one on the Digital Songs chart with first-week sales of 179,000 copies—the best sales week in Gomez's career for a single and both hers and Rocky's first number one single on the chart. It was the chart's first number-one debut since Swift's "Blank Space" (2014). Weeks after its debut on the Hot 100, "Good for You" then reached number six. After slipping one position, it rebounded to number five, its best position on the chart. It became the first top-five single on the Hot 100 for both Gomez and Rocky. For Gomez, "Same Old Love" matched its number-five peak in January 2016, and both remained her highest-charting singles until "Lose You to Love Me" reached number one in November 2019. For Rocky, "Good For You" remained his highest-peaking single to date until "No Limit" rose one position higher to number four in January 2018. "Good for You" entered the Mainstream Top 40 chart at number twenty-one as the chart's highest debut and greatest gainer for the week ending July 11, also debuting at 27 and 21 positions of Streaming Songs and Radio Songs charts, respectively. Later, it peaked at number four on Radio Songs and at number one on the Pop Songs chart becoming her first song to reach the summit. Gomez had previously peaked as high as number two on Pop Songs with "Come & Get It" in June 2013. It was certified triple platinum by the Recording Industry Association of America (RIAA), selling 1.6 million copies in the United States as of May 2017.

"Good for You" debuted at number nine on the Canadian Hot 100, being Gomez's third top-ten single on the chart, and later reaching a peak at number eight. The song later received a double platinum certification by Music Canada, denoting sales of 160,000 copies. On the New Zealand Singles Chart, it tied "Come & Get It" as Gomez's highest charting single, peaking at number fourteen. Recorded Music NZ recognized it as platinum, due to 15,000 sales. The song entered the Australian Singles Chart dated July 5, 2015, at number forty-one, and climbed twenty-five places to number sixteen the following week, making it Gomez's first top-twenty hit in that country. It has since then peaked at 10. The Australian Recording Industry Association (ARIA) gave it a double platinum certification, denoting sales of 140,000 units. In the United Kingdom, a report by The Official Charts Company (OCC) published on June 24, 2015 placed "Good for You" at number 39 in the midweek UK Singles Chart. It went to enter the UK Singles Chart issued for July 4, at number 47 with first-week sales of 9,679 units. Later, it reached a peak at number 23 and was certified platinum by British Phonographic Industry (BPI) denoting sales and streams equivalent to 600,000 units. In Europe, "Good for You" peaked at number sixteen on the Euro Digital Songs chart, reaching number one in Greece, the top ten in Spain, Norway and Czech Republic, and the top twenty in six other countries, including Finland, France and Denmark.

== Music videos ==
=== Background and release ===
"There's no love interest in the video, it's all me. The reason why I wanted it to feel that way is because it's about truly feeling good about yourself. I love the sensuality. It doesn't try too hard. It's not in everybody's face. It's like when you have that feeling with someone, when you just want to feel pretty and you want to feel good. Whatever it is, whether it's in jeans and a t-shirt, or someone else's shirt. Just something that makes you feel beautiful and sexy."

— Gomez on the music video's concept

The accompanying music video for "Good for You" was directed by Sophie Muller. In the video, Gomez wanted to represent her journey to womanhood and to promote female empowerment — which she felt strongly about and wanted to depict in a raw and vulnerable way. With the clip, she wanted to prove that young women should not be self-conscious of their sex appeal or be obliged to wear lingerie to feel attractive. "I feel like people here, especially guys are like, 'Ah, lingerie and sexy.' I think being sexy as a young woman or girl, is not caring what other people think, wearing like casual things, feeling sexy". Gomez felt it was important to collaborate with a female director as a means of female empowerment and wanted the visual to be raw and vulnerable. She was also drawn to jeans and T-shirt attire and believed it would prove to women that they need not dress in lingerie to feel attractive. She chose the video to be specifically about her, absent of a love interest or men, to reflect the song's meaning of female self-empowerment. She later said Muller "created a beautiful and intimate visual representation" of "Good for You". Speaking of the music video's theme, Gomez stated, "It's very jeans and a T-shirt, moments where a woman is deep in thought, or in a moment where she's in this crazy little rage. It just captures real things that women do. There are a lot of things that women do that are sexy that aren't just the typical, cheap way of being sexy."

Gomez wanted the video to use the initial, stripped-down version of the song. The video uses this version, which reworks the original song, omitting Rocky's verse, and introducing string instrumentation and a toning-down of the original's sound effects. The stripped down version of the song is slower in tempo than the single version, and without Rocky's verse is thirty seconds shorter. Rocky is also absent from the music video. Emilee Lindner of MTV News described the new version of the track as "slightly morose". Gomez created anticipation for the music video's release by posting several teasers on Instagram. On June 10, 2015, she shared a photograph of herself in a shower, captioned "Ready.. #itscomingsoon". Billboard said that image was a teaser for a music video, writing, "the intense lighting suggests this wasn't a candid selfie". Gomez posted a blurred image of a television screen on June 12, asking, "Now who would like the first look of my new music video?" On June 18, she posted another image from the clip, and on June 22, shared a thirty-three-second preview. The full music video premiered on screens in Times Square on June 26, and was made available for digital download on the iTunes Store the following day.

=== Synopsis ===
A screenshot from the music video, noted for its provocative imagery and manifestation of Gomez's artistic maturity.

The music video for "Good for You" follows a restrained, low-key, straightforward premise; it was shot on a basic set and focuses solely on Gomez. Emilee Lindner of MTV News summarized the clip as "a full three minutes of Selena's face". It has a minimalist theme of water. It also uses sexual imagery, contains several sexual innuendos, and features Gomez striking a number of provocative poses. Wendy Geller of Yahoo! said the poses were "PG-13, but still have a remarkably raunchy feel for not overtly showing anything". Although the song includes the lyric "hair real nice", Gomez chose to use a natural look throughout; she is apparently bra-less, has wavy hair, and wears minimal make-up. She changes her clothes several times during the clip; Casey Lewis of Teen Vogue said her outfits were "each more low-key than last".

The video begins with Gomez lying seductively on a bright, lime-green, velvet couch; wearing a loosely tied, robe-like fuchsia dress, her eyes look sad and she is seemingly awaiting the arrival of her partner. Gomez wears a floral, pink and lavender dress. The video then alternates between scenes of Gomez writhing around on a hardwood floor in ripped denim and a white T-shirt. In the next scene, Gomez undresses and takes a shower in slow-motion; though not explicitly nude, the scene focuses on her head and shoulders. Gomez is later depicted towering over a camera in a warehouse, before returning to scenes of her writhing around and expressing her inner longing. Gomez is also pictured with wet hair, sitting on a bar stool against a bare wall, wearing a wet white T-shirt; imagery reminiscent of single's cover art. It then alternates between a scene in which she wallows on an old-fashioned leather couch wearing a silk dress. Throughout the video, Gomez is pictured singing for the camera, often making direct eye contact with the viewer and seemingly lost in deep thought.

=== Reception ===
"Although the clip is thickly romantic, hints of sarcasm can be sensed from Gomez's multiple gazes straight into the camera's lens. [...] Gomez has given her fans what they've been asking for—a creative, Selena-centric video that pulls at all the right heartstrings."

— Marilyn Malara, United Press International

The music video garnered over 17 million views on YouTube within a week of its release, receiving 70 million views in the site within less than a month. According to Gary Trust of Billboard, the release of the music video helped "Good for You" to debut at number 27 on the Streaming Songs chart, contributing to its first-week stream tally of 4.5 million in the United States. Some critics compared the music video to the works of Lana Del Rey. Writing in New York, Dee Lockett said Gomez was "doing her best Lana Del Rey bombshell impression".

A number of critics said the clip manifested growth in Gomez's artistic imagery. Wendy Geller of Yahoo! wrote, "If ever there were any doubts that Selena Gomez has moved on from her Disney roots, [the music video] should quickly dispel them". Similarly, Allison Corneau of Us Weekly said Gomez showed "a decidedly more adult side" and proved she was "far from the Disney princess we used to know". Dennis Hinzmann of Out said the visual showcased a continuation of Gomez redefining herself as an artist. Jeff Benjamin of Fuse said the video "shed any Disney princess connection [Gomez] may have had with a steamy shower scene". Other critics said the video silenced then-recent hate speech Gomez had received, noting an underlying message in its premise. Cydney Eckert of Cosmopolitan wrote, "While the video reveals a sexier side of the singer we haven't really seen since Spring Breakers, it also showcases that same confidence that allows Selena to keep standing up to body-shamers and haters". This view was shared by Corneau, who said the clip was "no doubt part of [Gomez's] plan to silence the haters and live life on her own terms".

Gomez's appearance and portrayal were highlighted by some reviewers. Rap-Up called it Gomez's most intimate video yet, while Idolator's Carl Williott called it "understated". Alyssa Bailey of Elle said the clip was "basically an instruction on how to be hot" and proved "power in vulnerability". Teen Vogue writer Casey Lewis said, "But if she wants to look good for us, she certainly succeeds ... Actually good is an understatement". According to Geller, Gomez was as involved in the clip's overall intimacy as Muller, and her portrayal was "well-played". Geller lauded the visual as "a masterpiece of suggestion", saying that although Gomez's shower scene was "PG-13", it was "still sexy enough to make any respectable fan's tongue hang out". Francesca Bacardi of E! said Gomez should permanently choose her "absolutely gorgeous" natural look sported in the clip.

The music video's representation of the song, and its exclusion of Rocky were also well received. Morgan Peterson of Harper's Bazaar said the visual saw Gomez "syncing up to her sultry new sound", while MTV UK wrote that it "keeps true to the intense theme of the song". Lockett said it reinstated the song's "titillating striptease" theme, and that Rocky's exclusion was the clip's biggest statement, "so that all eyes and ears are on Selena. 'Make you never wanna leave, indeed.' " Lockett's commendation of Rocky's exclusion was echoed by Jason Lipshutz of Billboard and Marjua Esteves of Vibe, who both said his absence assisted the premise conceptually. In a less enthusiastic review, Yasmeen Gharnit of Nylon wrote, "While there's no exact formula for how Disney stars transition into full-fledged adults, it seems like it always involves a water and sexual innuendo-filled video". Gharnit said the visual "seems in equal parts too try-hard and unimaginative", and that it distracted from its intended stripped-down representation of the song.

=== Explicit version ===
A revised music video for "Good for You" was released on August 19, 2015. It uses the original version of the song, in addition of explicit verses by Rocky. The new clip retains Gomez's scenes from the original video with the addition of Rocky rapping his verse afront more dynamic visuals; including images of nature scenes, an exploding car, strobe lights and smoke machines. The two do not have any scenes in the video together, but Rocky's scene features large projected images of Gomez as his backdrop. Some footage of Rocky is also included in the first half the visual, with his shadow appearing in some of Gomez's scenes.

Casey Lewis of Teen Vogue found the video "a whole lot flashier and a bit edgier than the first". XXL said the clip had "basically everything you need to recall the era when labels actually dropped money on videos". Idolator's Bianca Gracie wrote that Rocky's scenes turned the video into a "tripfest". Eliza Thompson of Cosmopolitan said the visual was "extremely well-dressed" and "worth watching", and had "100 percent more purple swag". Camille Augustin of Vibe opined that the video took Rocky's "pretty boy persona to new heights".

== Promotion and cover ==
"Good for You" was accompanied by minimal promotion; Interscope focused on radio interviews for its promotion, instead of scheduling many TV performances. The first live performance of the song took place during Taylor Swift's 2015 The 1989 World Tour. On the concert of August 26, 2015 at the Staples Center in Los Angeles, Gomez served as a special guest and performed it together with Swift. On September 16, Gomez made the "Revival Event", where a group consisting of 800 fans watched her performing "Same Old Love" for the first time, as well "Good for You" and a piece of "Revival". During the event, made in the Palace Theater in Los Angeles, Gomez also revealed a preview of the music video for "Same Old Love" and stated that the fans would be part of the video. Still without performing it at the American TV, Gomez started the European promotion for the single on September 25, when she sang it and performed a cover of MAGIC!'s "Rude" at the BBC Radio 1's Live Lounge. Two days later, she performed the song on British talk show Alan Carr: Chatty Man, singing it on French Le Grand Journal.

On October 12, Gomez made a performance for Today, which was broadcast live from Rockefeller Center in New York City. She opened the show singing "Good for You" in a set amid the audience and rose to the main stage, where she sang "Same Old Love" and a medley consisting of "Me & the Rhythm" and "Come & Get It". Gomez served as the musical guest in the edition of January 23, 2016 of Saturday Night Live, hosted by Ronda Rousey. She performed a medley of "Good for You" and "Same Old Love", as well as a snippet of "Come & Get It", and made the first TV performance of "Hands to Myself". The song was also featured on the set list of Revival Tour, that began on May 6, 2016 and ended on August 13, 2016 due to lupus. American singer Eli Lieb posted a cover of "Good for You" on his YouTube channel on July 8, 2015.

== Track listings ==
No.	Title	Length
1.	"Good for You" (featuring ASAP Rocky)	3:41
Total length:		3:41

Digital download (Clean version)
No.	Title	Length
1.	"Good for You" (featuring ASAP Rocky)	3:41
Total length:		3:41

Digital remixes
No.	Title	Length
1.	"Good for You (Nebbra Remix)" (featuring ASAP Rocky)	4:01
2.	"Good for You (Yellow Claw & Cesqeaux Remix)" (featuring ASAP Rocky)	3:01
3.	"Good for You (Kasbo Remix)" (featuring ASAP Rocky)	3:41
Total length:		10:43

Digital download (Phantoms remix)
No.	Title	Length
1.	"Good for You (Phantoms Remix)" (featuring ASAP Rocky)	4:07

== Credits and personnel ==
Credits adapted from Revival album liner notes.

=== Recording ===
- Selena's vocals recorded at Interscope Studios (Santa Monica, California)
- ASAP Rocky's vocals recorded at Downtown Studios (New York City, New York)
- Selena's vocals produced at Interscope Studios (Santa Monica, California)
- ASAP Rocky's vocals produced at Downtown Studios (New York City, New York)
- Engineered at Interscope Studios (Santa Monica, California)
- Mixed at Mirrorball Studios (North Hollywood, California)
- Mastered at Sterling Sound (New York City, New York)

=== Management ===
- Published by Screaming Beauty Music/Bok Music (BMI), Justin's School for Girls and Warner-Tamerlane Publishing Corporation (BMI)
- All rights administered by Warner-Tamerlane Publishing Corporation (BMI) and Maxwell and Carter Global Publishing (BMI)
- All rights belong to Maxwell and Carter Global Publishing (BMI), Nolan Lambroza (BMI), ASAP Rocky Music Publishing LLC/Sony/ATV Music Publishing (BMI), Clockworklabs Music (BMI), Reach Music Songs (BMI) and Good Fellowship Publishing (ASCAP)
- ASAP Rocky appears courtesy of Polo Ground Music and RCA Records

=== Personnel ===
- Selena Gomez – lead vocals, songwriting
- ASAP Rocky – writing, featured vocals, co-production
- Julia Michaels – writing
- Justin Tranter – writing
- Nick Monson – writing, production
- Nolan Lambroza – writing, production
- Hector Delgado – writer, co-production, vocal production (Rocky), recording and vocals mixing (Rocky)
- Dreamlab – vocal production (Gomez)
- Rob Ellmore – recording and vocals engineering (Gomez)
- Juan Carlos Torrado – recording and vocals engineering assistant (Gomez)
- J.B. Saboia – recording and vocals engineer assistant (Rocky)
- Leah Haywood – background vocals
- Tony Maserat – mixing
- Tyler Scott – mixing assistant
- Chris Gehringer – mastering

== Charts ==
=== Weekly charts ===
Chart (2015)	Peak position
Australia (ARIA)	10
Australia Urban (ARIA)	2
Austria (Ö3 Austria Top 40)	27
Belgium (Ultratop 50 Flanders)	25
Belgium (Ultratop 50 Wallonia)	27
Canada Hot 100 (Billboard)	8
Canada CHR/Top 40 (Billboard)	4
Canada Hot AC (Billboard)	35
CIS Airplay (TopHit)	165
Czech Republic Airplay (ČNS IFPI)	29
Czech Republic Singles Digital (ČNS IFPI)	3
Denmark (Tracklisten)	11
Euro Digital Songs (Billboard)	16
Finland (Suomen virallinen lista)	20
France (SNEP)	14
Germany (GfK)	29
Greece Digital Songs (Billboard)	1
Hungary (Single Top 40)	24
Hungary (Stream Top 40)	12
Ireland (IRMA)	23
Italy (FIMI)	26
Lebanon (The Official Lebanese Top 20)	8
Luxembourg Digital Songs (Billboard)	9
Netherlands (Dutch Top 40 Tipparade)	2
Netherlands (Single Top 100)	31
New Zealand (Recorded Music NZ)	14
Norway (VG-lista)	9
Scottish Singles Sales (Official Charts)	17
Slovakia Airplay (ČNS IFPI)	24
Slovakia Singles Digital (ČNS IFPI)	6
Spain (Promusicae)	34
Sweden (Sverigetopplistan)	24
Switzerland (Schweizer Hitparade)	25
UK Singles (Official Charts)	23
Ukraine Airplay (TopHit)	77
US Billboard Hot 100	5
US Adult Pop Airplay (Billboard)	24
US Dance Club Songs (Billboard)	44
US Dance Airplay (Billboard)	6
US Mainstream Top 40 (Billboard)	1
US Rhythmic Airplay (Billboard)	4

=== Year-end charts ===
Chart (2015)	Position
Australia (ARIA)	51
Australia Urban (ARIA)	10
Canada (Canadian Hot 100)	30
Denmark (Tracklisten)	42
France (SNEP)	108
Spain (PROMUSICAE)	98
Sweden (Sverigetopplistan)	79
Switzerland (Schweizer Hitparade)	62
US Billboard Hot 100	27
US Dance/Mix Show Airplay (Billboard)	37
US Mainstream Top 40 (Billboard)	13
US Rhythmic (Billboard)	32

== Certifications ==
Region	Certification	Certified units/sales
Australia (ARIA)	5× Platinum	350,000^{‡}
Austria (IFPI Austria)	Gold	15,000^{‡}
Brazil (Pro-Música Brasil)	Diamond	250,000^{‡}
Canada (Music Canada)	2× Platinum	160,000^{*}
Denmark (IFPI Danmark)	2× Platinum	180,000^{‡}
Germany (BVMI)	Gold	200,000^{‡}
Italy (FIMI)	Platinum	50,000^{‡}
Mexico (AMPROFON)	Gold	30,000^{*}
New Zealand (RMNZ)	2× Platinum	60,000^{‡}
Norway (IFPI Norway)	3× Platinum	180,000^{‡}
Poland (ZPAV)	2× Platinum	100,000^{‡}
Portugal (AFP)	Gold	10,000^{‡}
Spain (Promusicae)	Gold	20,000^{‡}
Sweden (GLF)	2× Platinum	80,000^{‡}
United Kingdom (BPI)	Platinum	600,000^{‡}
United States (RIAA)	3× Platinum	3,000,000
^{*} Sales figures based on certification alone.^{‡} Sales+streaming figures based on certification alone.

== Release history ==
Country	Date	Format	Label	Ref.
Canada	June 22, 2015	Digital download (Clean version)	Interscope	
France	June 22, 2015	Digital download (Clean version)	Polydor	
Germany	June 22, 2015	Digital download (Clean version)	Universal	
Italy	June 22, 2015	Digital download (Clean version)	Universal	
Spain	June 22, 2015	Digital download (Clean version)	Universal	
United Kingdom	June 22, 2015	Digital download (Clean version)	Polydor	
United States	June 22, 2015	Digital download (Clean version)	Interscope	
United States	June 23, 2015	Contemporary hit radio	Interscope	
United States	July 7, 2015	Rhythmic contemporary	Interscope	
Italy	July 17, 2015	Contemporary hit radio	Universal	
Canada	August 19, 2015	Digital download (Explicit version)	Interscope	
France	August 19, 2015	Digital download (Explicit version)	Polydor	
Italy	August 19, 2015	Digital download (Explicit version)	Universal	
Spain	August 19, 2015	Digital download (Explicit version)	Universal	
United States	August 19, 2015	Digital download (Explicit version)	Interscope	
United States	September 4, 2015	Digital remixes	Interscope	
United States	October 23, 2015	Digital download (Phantoms Remix)	Interscope	

== See also ==
- List of Billboard Hot 100 top 10 singles in 2015
- List of number-one digital songs of 2015 (U.S.)
- List of Billboard Mainstream Top 40 number-one songs of 2015
