= Revival (Selena Gomez album) =

2015 studio album by Selena Gomez

- Physical deluxe edition cover (Note: Also digital cover outside Asia, and physical standard edition cover in several areas.)

Studio album by Selena Gomez
- Released: October 9, 2015
- Recorded: June 2014 – August 2015
- Studios: Rokstone and The Hide Out Studios (London, UK); Dreamlab, Fonogenic, Magical Thinking and Westlake Studios (Los Angeles, California); Downtown Studios (New York City); Casa Aramara (Punta Mita, Nayarit, Mexico); Interscope, Rock Mafia and Soundbay Studios (Santa Monica, California); Maratone and Wolf Cousins Studios (Stockholm, Sweden)
- Genres: Dance-pop; electropop
- Length: 39:24
- Label: Interscope
- Producers: Rock Mafia; Hit Boy; Benny Blanco; Mattman & Robin; Max Martin; Stargate; Nick Monson; Sir Nolan; Christopher Braide; Steve Mac; Felix Snow; Donkeyboy

Selena Gomez chronology
For You (2014)	Revival (2015)	Rare (2020)

Alternative cover
- Physical standard edition cover (Note: Also 5th anniversary CD edition, and cover for all Asian editions.)

Singles from Revival
- 1. "Good for You" Released: June 22, 2015; 2. "Same Old Love" Released: September 10, 2015; 3. "Hands to Myself" Released: January 20, 2016; 4. "Kill Em with Kindness" Released: May 3, 2016

Revival is the second solo studio album by American singer Selena Gomez. It was released on October 9, 2015, by Interscope Records, her first album released through that label. Preparation for the album began in 2014, when Gomez left her previous label Hollywood Records. The record was influenced by a range of artists, particularly Christina Aguilera and her album Stripped (2002). Gomez co-wrote twelve of its sixteen tracks. The album reflects her journey since 2013, including the media scrutiny surrounding her personal life. As executive producers, Gomez, Danny D and Tim Blacksmith collaborated with Hit-Boy, Rock Mafia, and Stargate to achieve Gomez's new desired sound. Revival is primarily a dance-pop and electropop record, connected by a tropical beach sound, with lyrical themes revolving around love and confidence.

Upon its release, Revival received positive reviews from music critics, many of whom praised its production, lyrical content, and sultry sound. The album was included in several year-end best music lists by publications. Revival debuted at number one on the Billboard 200, marking Gomez's second consecutive number-one album in the United States, following Stars Dance (2013). Elsewhere, the album also charted within the top ten of twenty territories, including Canada, Brazil, France, Mexico and Australia. It was certified platinum by the Recording Industry Association of America (RIAA), denoting one million album-equivalent units (including albums sales, streaming and track-equivalent units) sold in the United States.

With its singles "Good for You" (featuring rapper ASAP Rocky) and "Same Old Love" both reaching number five and "Hands to Myself" charting at number seven on the Billboard Hot 100, Revival is further distinguished as Gomez's first record to house multiple top ten singles in the United States; all of which became her first three number-one singles on the Mainstream Top 40 chart.

To promote the album, Gomez performed the songs in several televised appearances, including The Today Show, the 2015 American Music Awards and the Victoria's Secret Fashion Show. Furthermore, Gomez embarked on a concert tour, titled Revival Tour in May 2016, which visited North America, Asia and Oceania, before it was canceled in August 2016 following Gomez facing health issues stemming from her lupus diagnosis.

The album was intended as a revival by Gomez both sonically and publicly. Acting as an executive producer for the first time, Gomez stated this is her first album where she felt fully free to decide all aspects about the project and sound, and leaned into her hidden artistry and uncharted depth without any pushback. She stated that she had developed a severe daily fear of public scrutiny after hearing discussion about "everything" and "anything” she has ever done in her life, but didn't want to live not trusting anyone and always fearing the worst.

== Background ==
In July 2013, Gomez released her debut solo album, Stars Dance. The album was well received commercially, debuting at number one on the Billboard 200. Gomez embarked on the Stars Dance Tour later that year, which was set to cross several continents, including dates in Asia and Oceania. These concerts would not materialize as Gomez canceled the remainder of the tour in late 2013, citing personal reasons: "It has become clear to me and those close to me that after many years of putting my work first, I need to spend some time on myself in order to be the best person I can be." Gomez entered a rehab treatment facility for her lupus diagnosis in May 2014. Publications began to speculate her intent in fulfilling contractual obligations by releasing a final compilation album for her longtime label, Hollywood Records. Later reports published in September suggested that she had secured a new recording contract with Interscope chairman John Janick. At that time, Gomez had already sold around 2.8 million albums and 18.1 million singles in the United States, including three studio albums with her band Selena Gomez & the Scene.

In November 2014, Gomez captioned an Instagram post with: "As I have a last listen, I thought a lot about my year. I thought a lot about my voice. And after a year of holding on. I think it's time to start sharing." She later released her compilation album For You, representing her final project with Hollywood Records as Gomez officially announced her change in labels the following month. After performing its lead single "The Heart Wants What it Wants" at the 2014 American Music Awards, Gomez revealed that she had begun work on her next studio album. She cited the single as a reference point, stating, "It's exciting for me to start off with something like [it]. And then start leading into writing about all the other things that are going on in my life and have gone on in the past year or so. Even if it's things that people may not necessarily know about. So I'm excited to kind of put more of my heart and soul into the next chapter of music." The same month, Gomez commented that she had been recording new music, and suggested a possible partnership with producer and disc jockey Zedd. On February 23, 2015, a collaboration between Gomez and Zedd titled "I Want You to Know" was released.

== Development ==
Gomez discussed that her new material would reflect upon the "journey" she experienced since 2013, with Christina Garibaldi from MTV News assuming her comments were referencing her former relationship with Justin Bieber, and a period spent in rehab in 2014, among other subjects. In an interview with Ryan Seacrest in June, Gomez stated, it is about her "new-found confidence". Her voice coach also commented that the album was going to be "more adult, more feminine and more about Selena's experiences."

"I think after four albums, I finally feel a little more like myself than I ever have. I have this confidence and I have a better understanding of what I'm talking about. This is now a point in my life where I have experienced friendships or relationships or travel or exploring, it's really fun."

— Gomez describing her newfound insight when recording Revival.

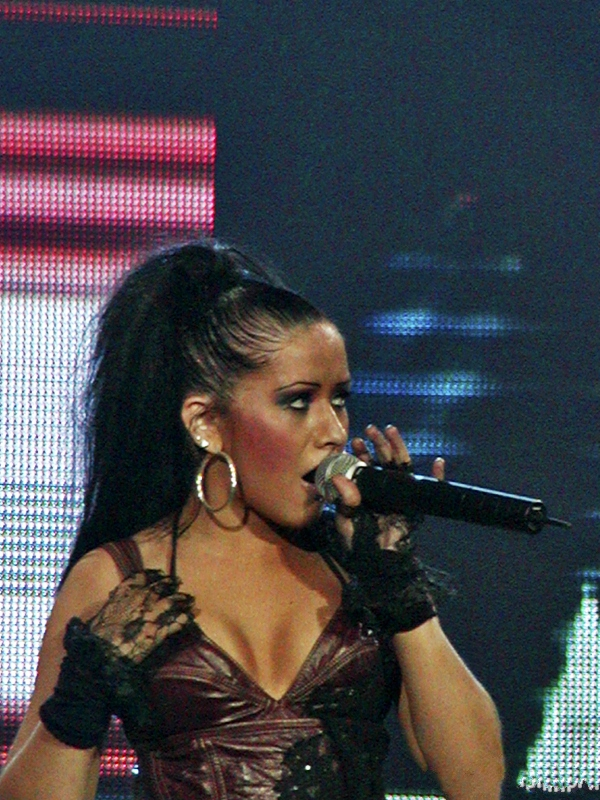
Gomez cited the album Stripped by Christina Aguilera (pictured) as a source of inspiration while recording Revival

Gomez stated that Revival offers insight into her perception of various experiences, further elaborating on its themes of kindness, having faith, heartbreak, the "passion of a relationship" as well as "being [her] own person". As the album's executive producer, she "wanted to know that every single song meant the world to me, whether I wrote it or not. For me, I had to discover what was going to separate me. I know that I'm not the world's greatest singer, but I do know that I have a unique tone. And I'm an actress—I love being able to translate everything I'm feeling inside through my voice and through the songs. [...] This whole record is extremely intimate."

In an interview with Entertainment Weekly, Gomez stated that she was influenced by a wide range of artists growing up, from Janet Jackson and NSYNC. She commented that her main influence for the record was Christina Aguilera, specifically her 2002 release Stripped, which she cites as an exemplar of a "complete" album and inspired her own decision to tell a story through Revival. Gomez further commented on her life in the media: "Now, I'm in the place of my life where I released an album at 16—nobody's going to relate [to that]. They're going to be like, 'Great, what are you singing about?' Because of how much my life was exposed, I almost had to use that for this record. People can't say, 'You don't know what you're talking about. You haven't been through this.' It's like, you’ve all grown up with me at this point!"

== Recording ==
Gomez first hinted at a collaboration with Australian singer Sia through a November 2014 Instagram post, and Sia later stated that she had composed some material for her. Gomez began to record songs for Revival in December 2014, revealing collaborations with producers Dreamlab and Ruffian and production team Stargate. She initially expected that the record would contain 15 "extremely exciting" songs. In January 2015, production duo Rock Mafia announced they were working with Gomez on the album. She explained to MTV News that Revival was the most she'd ever gotten creatively involved in album, "Every single thing I'm even remotely singing about is something I've related to and something I'm hitting the nail on, and I had to pick what was going to represent the album and who I am as a whole."

"Good for You" was one of the first tracks recorded, which was initially written by Nick Monson, Julia Michaels and Justin Tranter. In an interview with Spin, Tranter revealed that their studio time was originally accommodated to "tweak" a different song, and the trio wrote "Good for You" in 45 minutes upon its completion. It was the third song she received since signing with her new label Interscope Records. Gomez exhausted herself prior to the recording session for "Good for You", as she had pressured herself into figuring out a sound and concept for the album. Gomez's vocals cracked due to this, and the song "took on this emotion [she] didn't realize [she] could tap into".

Midway through the album's recording process, Gomez went on a trip to Puerto Vallarta, Mexico with Hit-Boy and a few members of his producing team, as well as Rock Mafia and songwriters Justin Tranter and Julia Michaels. According to her, "it was all of us in one house for five or six days. We would go out, listen to live music, and go back and create in this studio – in a closet, basically." During the creative process Gomez wanted "to get out of her head." "Body Heat" was the first song that Gomez recorded on the trip; at 5. A.M. after she heard Mexican music through the night. According to her, because the "live instruments, the beats, what you feel ... It kind of represents everything that I love about who I am." While working on the album, Gomez also enlisted frequent collaborators Rock Mafia to help make her sound a reality. They assisted Gomez on the creation of six of its tracks, including "Revival" and "Kill Em with Kindness", the latter being one of the "most personal" tracks on Revival. She told the producers that although the production was important, she wanted its focus to be the lyrics. According to Gomez, one of the main inspirations behind "Kill Em with Kindness" was the body-shaming she dealt with from the media, after photos surfaced online of her in a bikini during a trip to Mexico in April 2015. Many claimed she had gained weight, with some outlets going as far as to label her a "mess", and suggested Gomez was "going off the deep end". She commented: "I was getting a lot of hate for my body and ‘you're gaining weight,’ and so I was in Mexico and I was just feeling all of this stuff and I would be lying to you if I said it didn't kind of hurt my feelings, but I kind of channeled that into my music." Gomez called the experience "degrading", explaining that she had never been through such intense bullying before. Several songs were recorded at Casa Aramara Studios located in Punta Mita. Speaking about her experience in Mexico, Gomez stated:

I brought my producers and writers, and we just got inspired. I'm Mexican, and it's incredible to be able to acknowledge that part of me, and it was really about how much you can feel when you're in that culture, when you're around people.

Gomez also worked with recording team Stargate, who handled "Sober" and "Same Old Love", the latter of which was co-written by British singer Charli XCX. XCX and Gomez weren't in the physical presence of each other during the session, though XCX's manager was present throughout. Gomez was drawn to the track and she believed "Same Old Love" represented her strained relationship with her father and how it reflected on her subsequent romantic relationships. The song's recording sessions took place at Westlake Studios in Los Angeles, and Dreamlab Studios in Studio City, California. "Sober" was also developed during this time. According to Gomez, inspiration came after she and one of its writers, Chloe Angelides, discussed social awkwardness and how Gomez "would hang out with people and they would drink and they're so fun, then the next day it would be weird."

Following the commercial success of "Good for You" as lead single treatment, Gomez decided to collaborate for an additional four days with Michaels and Tranter despite her label's instructions for the album to be mixed at the time. Before the sessions began, Gomez felt that she had already addressed her desired themes for Revival, but wanted additional material that would be "fresh from a female perspective", which culminated in "Hands to Myself". Recording took place at Wolf Cousins and Maratone Studios in Stockholm, Sweden, and at Interscope Studios in Santa Monica, California. In those four days, they also developed "Me & the Rhythm" which was the last song recorded for the album.

== Composition ==
=== Music and lyrics ===
Musically, Revival is primarily a dance-pop and electropop record with R&B vibes, which has been also described as "a heady mix of electronic dance music pop". It has a "warm, tropical beach-pop sound", and as noted by AllMusic's Tim Sendra, "[it] veers away from the bubblegum nature of her early work or the genre-hopping aspects of other releases." As he continued, "the album sticks pretty close to a club bangers-and-ballads mix with a couple of R&B-inspired jams thrown in." Other critics also saw that the album has "midtempo pop", minimalist dance beats and smoldering R&B grooves. Steve Knopper of Newsday also highlighted that "[t]he album is frequently dark and ominous, full of torch songs, with just enough stylish electronic dance music synths and upbeat melodies to enliven the mood." Mikael Wood of Los Angeles Times and Mike Wass of Idolator both compared it to the works of Janet Jackson, with Wood comparing to her 2015 record, Unbreakable in terms of sound, and Wass to her breakthrough album, Control (1986) in terms of its empowering themes.

=== Songs and lyrical content ===
The album's opening track "Revival" was considered "an experimental electro-adventure" with an "uplifting chorus." Lyrically, the song deals with themes of self-care, embracing one's inner power and self-restoration. It begins with a spoken-word introduction, where she says: "I'm reborn in every moment, so who knows what I'll become?," before singing "It's my time to butterfly," where "the word 'butterfly' serv[es] as both a state of being and an intransitive verb." Gomez also explained that the song gathers everything she was feeling in the two years leading up to the album's release and the need she felt to be heard. The lines, 'I'll admit it's been painful, but I'll be honest and grateful,' is one of her favorites because "ultimately it led me and pushed me to be where I am today. Nothing has been handed to me. I've had to strive for it, and really put my all in it." The second track "Kill Em with Kindness" is described as a dance, club-banger with a "tropical house breeze" and "added bells and whistles". The song offers positive advice for dealing with critics: instead of raising the proverbial middle finger, it suggests to take the high road and kill them with kindness. For Gomez, "[i]t's kind of my motto for life. It's so much easier to be mean. It's so easy to just kind of give yourself that, but it's so hard to walk away from a situation, turn your cheek the other way, and be the bigger person."

"Same Old Love", an electropop and synthpop track is built on a "rickety" piano sample and backgrounded Italo synths, starting off with a "whimsical ‘60s feel, but morph[ing] into a punchy bass dance track," In terms of lyrics, "Same Old Love" is about how people perceive love, and how everyone has a cycle, whether it's friendship, family, a relationship. She further explained it: "People get uncomfortable with change, and they compromise, and I think this song is representing the angst, and the pain, and a little bit of the anger that it comes with." "Hands to Myself" is a dance-pop and synthpop number, and has influences of American recording artist Prince. It begins stripped-down with a minimal backdrop and a sparse, thumping beat. This comprises drums, bass, lightly clicking percussion and hand claps. "Hands to Myself" is a flirty and sassy song about seduction, "Sober" brings ‘80s "slamming" synthesizers to the fore and "girlie yelps", which lyrically regards social awkwardness and how a significant other doesn't know how to love unless alcohol is involved and the recognition that the boundaries in a relationship aren't so great. "Good for You" is an electro-R&B song, with pendulum-swing rhythm, swirling keyboard atmospherics and affirming ASAP Rocky rap; it also has Gomez "exploring her lower range and playing up the smokier edges of her speaking voice." The lyrics to "Good for You" explore confidence, embracing one's sexuality and feeling comfortable in your own skin. "Camouflage" is a piano-driven ballad, that addresses the end of a relationship, and even though she has 'so much shit' to say, she doesn't know how since the person that she was with is no longer recognizable."

"Me & the Rhythm" is a dance, disco, and "breathy" synthpop song, with an "icy" Scandinavian arrangement, while the trance-inspired The song talks about losing yourself on the dance floor, while being free within that moment, being free within yourself. while "Outta My Hands (Loco)" was compared to her earlier albums, Stars Dance (2013) and When the Sun Goes Down (2011). "Survivors", as emphasized by Gomez, talks about "surviving every day, in our circumstances [...] and bringing each other up instead of tearing each other down, ’cause we're all just surviving." She completed: "'Survivors' is a community thing ... What's mine is yours. It's us. It's ours together." "Body Heat" brings Latin fusion with saxophone, horns and brass, and was inspired by Mexican culture, its lyrics regards sex, while "Rise" is "an empowerment anthem encouraging perseverance and determination in tough moments." On the other hand, "Rise" contains a gospel chorus, whooping and a spoken-word prayer. "Me & My Girls" was considered a "party-jam", with a "Robert Rodriguez inspired sound," the song incorporates themes of female empowerment. "Nobody" has syncopated beats, finger snaps, it also contains a synth flute and trip hop beats, its lyrics and finds the singer paying tribute to her lover, and as she claimed, it was written about her faith and connection with God, "Perfect" is about "feeling downright obsessive as she wrestles with her man moving on to the next one," and Gomez admitted that the song is "very, very personal song, and it was extremely accurate. [...] In a way, it's a little sad. It's beautiful too." Musically, the song is a modern R&B performance that has a "dreamy, harp-smattered production." The last track from deluxe version of Revival is "Cologne", the song has a "mellow, midtempo" vibe. and talks about "constantly having a certain someone on her mind, and loving herself when they are not around."

== Singles ==
"Good for You" was released as the album's lead single on June 22, 2015. Gomez created anticipation for the release of the single by posting several teasers of the song on Instagram. The song was released to warm critical reception. It debuted at number nine on the US Billboard Hot 100, becoming her third top 10 song on the chart and her highest charting debut. "Good for You" has reached number five on the chart, becoming her highest-charting single at the time. It sold 179,000 downloads in its first week, marking the first time Gomez topped the Digital Songs chart, and becoming her highest first-week sales of any of her songs. The song's video was released on June 26, 2015. In conclusion, the song also topped the US Mainstream Top 40 chart in September 2015, reached the top-ten in five countries and top-twenty in other four.

In early August, Billboard confirmed "Same Old Love" as the second single from the album. On August 5, 2015, Gomez was at the first day of iHeartMedia's Music Summit where she played the song. The song was made available for digital download with the pre-order of the album on September 10. The music video was shot in downtown Los Angeles on August 15 and part of it was shot at the Revival event. Fans from the event appeared at the end of the video. The music video was released to Apple Music on September 22, and to Vevo on October 7, 2015. The song has peaked on the Billboard Hot 100 at number five, thus tying with "Good for You" to become her highest-charting single, and has become her second number one on the Mainstream Top 40 chart. Elsewhere, it reached the top-ten in Canada and top-forty in five countries.

In early October, during an interview with USA Today, Gomez admitted her desire to release "Sober" as a single from Revival "at some point". On October 2, Gomez released "Me & the Rhythm" as a promotional single. It reached number fifty-seven on the Canadian Hot 100.

"Hands to Myself" was serviced to contemporary hit radio as the third single from Revival in the US on January 26, 2016. The music video premiered as an Apple Music exclusive on December 21, 2015, and was released on Vevo on January 20, 2016. The song has reached number 7 on the Billboard Hot 100 chart. Internationally, it has reached number five in New Zealand and number nine in Slovakia, as well as the top 40 in several other countries, such as Australia and Czech Republic.

In March 2016, Gomez confirmed "Kill Em with Kindness" as the fourth and final single from the album. It peaked at number 39 on the Billboard Hot 100. The song's accompanying music video was released on June 6, 2016. It was sent to contemporary hit radio on May 3, 2016.

== Release and artwork ==
In July 2015, Gomez announced that her sophomore record would be titled Revival, and that it would be released on October 9. The album's original artwork is not well-recognized, as it was replaced by a black-and-white deluxe edition cover later that year. The standard edition cover depicts Gomez in a sequined red dress; although it was replaced by the deluxe edition cover for physical pressings released after November 30. The track listing and alternate album art were revealed in September; the latter depicts a topless Gomez dressed in high-waisted black shorts with her hair and arms crossed over covering her breasts. At the time, Gomez shared that she felt the cover gave "a little Linda Ronstadt ’70s vibe," and described the picture as "a beautiful representation of where I am." Christina Garibaldi from MTV News highlighted similarities to the visuals for Stripped by Christina Aguilera (2002), a record which Gomez specified as a source of inspiration during the recording process. In June 2022, she revealed that she felt "ashamed" of the famous photo; she claimed that she is "not an overly sexual person" and said that the risqué image was not true to her values and personal boundaries.

=== Promotion ===
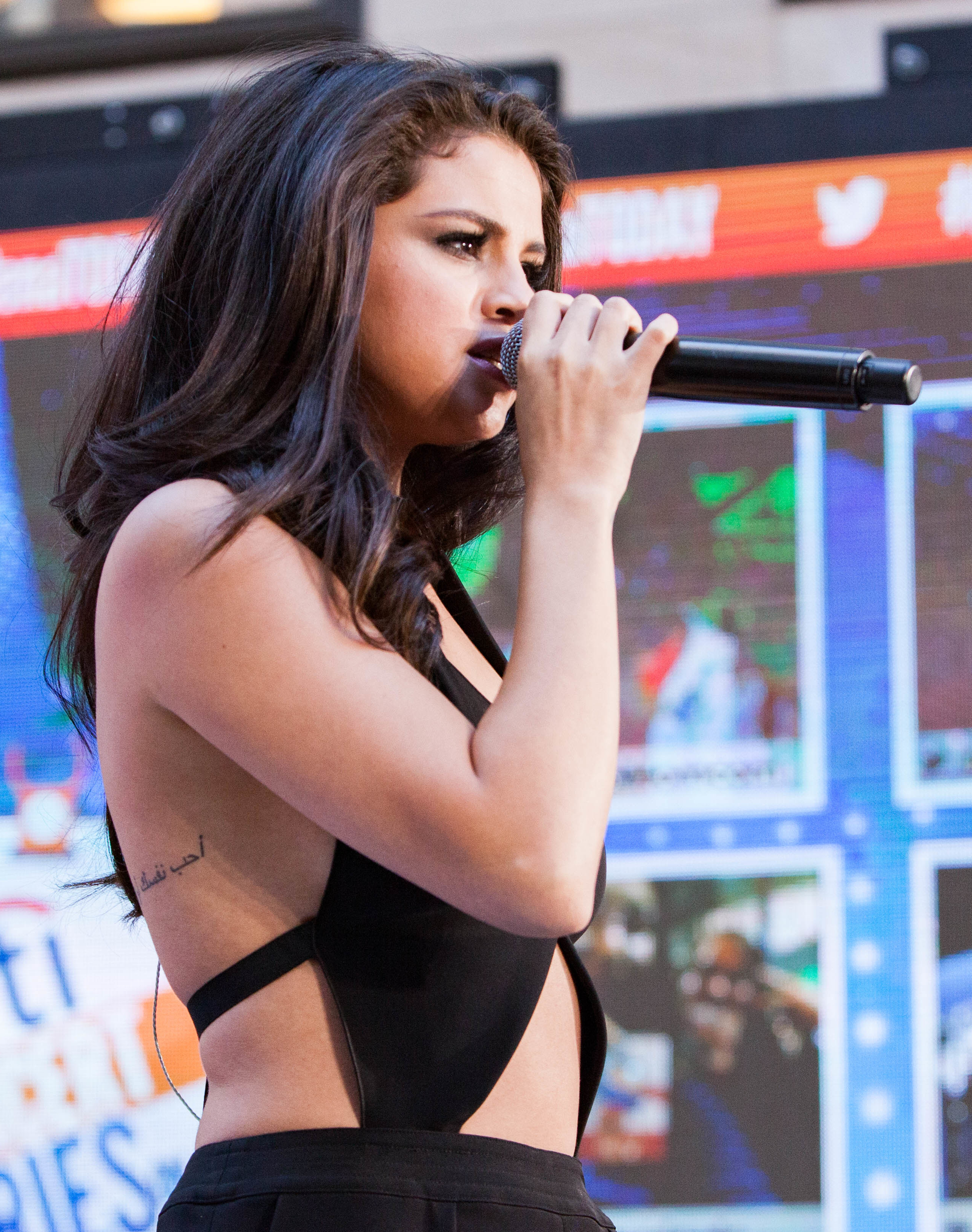
Gomez performing during The Today Show

Gomez held an invitation-only "Revival Event" at the Palace Theatre in Los Angeles for 800 fans on September 16. It was advertised as an advanced screening of her music video for "Same Old Love," although Gomez delivered a previously unannounced performance of the song to the audience before revealing that they would be included in the final clip. On October 2, Gomez confirmed that she would embark on the Revival Tour in May 2016; first-leg tour dates in the United States and Canada were announced on October 5. On October 7, snippets of the eleven songs from the standard edition of Revival were made available for preview.

On September 25, 2015, Gomez made her live debut of "Good for You" on Alan Carr: Chatty Man, where she also gave an interview. On the same day, she performed an acoustic version of the song, along with a cover of Magic!'s "Rude" on BBC's Live Lounge. Three days later, she performed the song on Le Grand Journal. On October 12, 2015, she went to Today and performed "Good for You", "Same Old Love" and a medley of previous hit "Come & Get It" with "Me & the Rhythm". "Same Old Love" was also performed on The Ellen DeGeneres Show, The Tonight Show Starring Jimmy Fallon, 2015 American Music Awards, and at the 2015 Billboard Women in Music. During the 2015 Victoria's Secret Fashion Show, she performed "Hands to Myself" and "Me & My Girls". Gomez also made a set during the Jingle Ball Tour 2015, where she performed "Same Old Love", "Good for You", "Love You Like a Love Song," "Hands to Myself" and, for the first time, "Kill Em with Kindness". Gomez was the musical guest on Saturday Night Live for the episode dated January 23, 2016, where she performed a medley of "Good for You" and "Same Old Love", as well as the full television debut of "Hands to Myself".

== Critical reception ==
Professional ratings
Aggregate scores
Source	Rating
AnyDecentMusic?	6.6/100
Metacritic	74/100
Review scores
Source	Rating
AllMusic	3/5 stars
Boston Globe	positive
Idolator	4/5 stars
Los Angeles Times	positive
Newsday	B+
The Observer	3/5 stars
Rolling Stone	4/5 stars
Slant Magazine	3.5/5 stars
Spin	6/10
USA Today	3/4 stars

Revival received positive reviews from music critics. At Metacritic, which assigns a normalized rating out of 100 to reviews from mainstream publications, the album received an average score of 74, based on 9 reviews, indicating "generally favorable reviews". Writing for Rolling Stone, Brittany Spanos stated that "Revival is an audacious name for a 23-year-old singer's second album, but from start to finish, Gomez earns it," noting that "[t]his is the sound of a newly empowered pop artist growing into her strengths like never before." Sal Cinquemani of Slant Magazine was very receptive, noting that "[s]ong for song, 'Revival' rivals Carly Rae Jepsen's 'Emotion' for breakout pop album of the year, but if it similarly falls short of greatness, it's due in large part to a lack of originality. [...] And yet, all of those songs are standouts." James Reed from Boston Globe opined that Revival is "a forthright album of pop songs that make it clear she is ready to be honest and even vulnerable in her music." Mike Wass of Idolator agreed, calling it "an immaculately curated collection that showcases the 23-year-old's ability to genre-hop and experiment, while staying true to herself." Steve Knopper from Newsday applauded Gomez for sounding "appealingly desperate and hungry, and this quality transcends the most familiar-sounding material," adding: "Something in Selena Gomez's pop formula is nicely soft-spoken and mysterious."

Mikael Wood from the Los Angeles Times praised the album for being "surprisingly modest, from its midtempo pacing to its thoughtful introspection," acknowledging the fact that "Gomez is finding freedom in control, kudos to her for getting there so quickly." Writing for USA Today, Elysa Gardner noted that the album "is generally at its best when Gomez keeps her tone light and bright and her energy positive. [...] At this rate, Gomez is bound to get at least a few skeptics off of Instagram and onto the dance floor." Tim Stack wrote for Entertainment Weekly that "[o]n her fifth album Gomez goes for mood-setting, and the result is "a gripping batch of sultry pop jams that are more 'Netflix and chill,' less 'Let's hit the curb,'" claiming that it is "as fresh and forward-thinking as the music of indie darlings Tove Lo and FKA twigs." Christina Jaleru of The Washington Times was positive, commending it for "breez[ing] through to the finish line – the dance floor -with 11 nearly impeccable tracks that skip from the 1960s to the ‘80s to right this minute."

While seeing some "genericism" on the album, Jia Tolentino of Spin highlighted that "[a]t its high points, 'Revival' is marked by this lush, sphinx-like readiness: as if, after a decade and a half of being nonstop front and center, Gomez has finally figured out what it means to center herself." Katherine St. Asaph of Time emphasized that "[w]here she falters most is what 'Revival' is ostensibly about: bratty confidence," noticing that "[m]usically, though, Revival is most interesting when it's still in the cocoon." Tim Sendra from AllMusic, however, gave the album a mixed review, writing that "[Revival] makes for a solid pop album overall, but it's a little too formulaic and predictable to rate among her best work." Emily Mackay of The Observer also gave a mixed review, perceiving that "[t]he most surprising thing about Revival is its understatement, despite the hit-making co-writers."

=== Year-end lists ===
Revival was featured on several year-end list of best albums. It was listed at number 43 on Rolling Stone's "50 Best Albums of 2015" list, with the editors commenting "If Gomez started the year as one of many bright young celebrity faces, she ended it as a pop star who demands to be taken seriously."

Critic/Publication	List	Rank	Ref.
Entertainment Weekly	The 40 Best Albums of 2015	32	
Entertainment Weekly	The 10 Best Pop Albums of 2015	9	
Rolling Stone	The 50 Best Albums of 2015	43	
Rolling Stone	20 Best Pop Albums of 2015	5	
Rolling Stone India	The 50 Albums of the Decade of 2019	45	
Slant Magazine	The 25 Best Albums of 2015	12	
Spin	The 25 Best Pop Albums of 2015	14	
Fuse	Top 20 Pop Albums of 2015	14	

== Commercial performance ==
In the United States, Revival debuted at number one on the Billboard 200, earning 117,000 album-equivalent units in its first week, of which 86,000 were pure album sales. It also gave her highest first-week sales as of October 2015, surpassing her previous album. In its second week on the chart, Revival fell to number seven. As of January 2020, the album has sold over 435,000 copies in the US. The album was certified platinum by the Recording Industry Association of America (RIAA), for combined album sales, on-demand audio, video streams and track-sales equivalent of one million units.

The album entered the New Zealand Albums Chart at number two, giving Gomez her second solo top ten album and highest-charting release. In Australia, the album debuted at number three, becoming her highest album on the chart and second to debut inside the top-ten. In Greece, the album debuted at number one, while in Brazil it reached number three, receiving a platinum certification in the latter for selling over 40,000 copies. The album also reached the top-ten in other 17 countries, including Canada, France, Ireland, Netherlands, and Sweden.

== Track listing ==
Credits adapted from the album's liner notes

Revival track listing
No.	Title	Writer(s)	Producer(s)	Length
1.	"Revival"	Antonina Armato; Tim James; Chauncey Hollis; Justin Tranter; Julia Michaels; Adam Schmalholz; Selena Gomez	Rock Mafia; Hit Boy; Dubkiller^{[b]}	4:06
2.	"Kill Em with Kindness"	Armato; James; Benjamin Levin; Dave Audé; Gomez	Rock Mafia; Benny Blanco; R3drum^{[b]}	3:37
3.	"Hands to Myself"	Tranter; Michaels; Robin Fredrikson; Mattias Larsson; Max Martin; Gomez	Mattman & Robin^{[a]}; Martin^{[c]}	3:20
4.	"Same Old Love"	Tor Hermansen; Mikkel Eriksen; Levin; Charlotte Aitchison; Ross Golan	Stargate; Blanco; Tim Blacksmith^{[d]}; Danny D^{[d]}	3:49
5.	"Sober"	Chloe Angelides; Jacob Kasher Hindlin; Michaels; Eriksen; Hermansen; Gomez	Stargate; Dreamlab^{[c]}; Blacksmith^{[d]}; Danny D^{[d]}	3:14
6.	"Good for You" (featuring ASAP Rocky)	Michaels; Tranter; Nick Monson; Nolan Lambroza; Rakim Mayers; Hector Delgado; Gomez	Monson; Lambroza; Dreamlab^{[c]}; Delgado^{[c]}^{[e]}; Rocky^{[e]}	3:41
7.	"Camouflage"	Badrilla Bourelly; Christopher Braide	Braide; Dreamlab^{[c]}	4:09
8.	"Me & the Rhythm"	Tranter; Michaels; Fredrikson; Larsson; Gomez	Mattman & Robin^{[a]}	3:33
9.	"Survivors"	Golan; Steve Mac	Mac; Dreamlab^{[c]}	3:41
10.	"Body Heat"	Armato; James; Hollis; Tranter; Michaels; Gomez	Rock Mafia; Hit Boy	3:27
11.	"Rise"	Armato; James; Schmalholz; Gomez	Rock Mafia; Hit Boy	2:47
Total length:				39:24

Deluxe edition bonus tracks
No.	Title	Writer(s)	Producer(s)	Length
12.	"Me & My Girls"	Armato; James; Matt Morris; Gomez	Rock Mafia	3:30
13.	"Nobody"	Michaels; Monson; Shane Stevens; Gomez	Monson; Stevens^{[c]}; Michaels^{[c]}; Benjamin Rice^{[f]}	3:37
14.	"Perfect"	Michaels; Tranter; Felix Snow; Gomez	Snow; Dreamlab^{[c]}	4:02
15.	"Outta My Hands (Loco)"	Armato; James; Gomez	Rock Mafia; Frank Dukes^{[b]}	3:32
16.	"Cologne"	Angelides; Golan; Eriksen; Kent Sundberg; Cato Sundberg; Gomez	Donkey Boy; Stargate^{[a]}; Dreamlab^{[c]}; Miles Walker^{[c]}	3:53
Total length:				57:58

Notes

- ^{^[a]} signifies a producer and vocal producer
- ^{^[b]} signifies an additional producer
- ^{^[c]} signifies a vocal producer
- ^{^[d]} signifies an executive producer
- ^{^[e]} signifies a co-producer
- ^{^[f]} signifies an additional vocal producer
- ^{^[g]} Selena Gomez is only credited as a writer by ASCAP and BMI, not on physical editions of the album.
- "Me & My Girls" samples "Hot Tent Blues" by Late of the Pier.
- In the United States, tracks 15 and 16 were initially available exclusively on the Target edition.
- The Japan deluxe edition includes the bonus remix track "Good for You" (KASBO Remix), and a bonus DVD which features the making of, and music video of "Good for You".
- The Japan tour edition includes the bonus remix tracks "Hands to Myself" (Kandy Remix), "Same Old Love" (Borgore Remix), and "Good for You" (Nebbra Remix), and a bonus DVD which features the Revival event, and the music videos of all singles.

== Personnel ==
Credits adapted from the album's liner notes

- Selena Gomez – lead vocals (all tracks)
- Rock Mafia – production (tracks 1, 2, 10–12, 15), mixing (tracks 1, 10–12, 15), percussion (tracks 1, 10, 12, 15), programming (tracks 2, 15), instrumentation (track 2), background vocals (tracks 10–12, 15), guitar (tracks 10, 12, 15), keyboards (tracks 11, 15)
- Mattman & Robin – production, vocal production, programming, recording, bass, drums, percussion & synths (tracks 3, 8), guitar & piano (track 3), tracking (track 8)
- Steve Hammons – engineering & mix engineering (tracks 1, 10–12, 15), percussion (tracks 10, 12, 15), recording (track 2), guitar (track 10), programming (track 15)
- Rob Ellmore – engineering (tracks 4–7, 9, 14, 16), recording (tracks 4, 6, 16), tracking (track 16)
- Hit Boy – production & programming (tracks 1, 10, 11), percussion (track 10)
- Nigel Lundemo – programming (tracks 1, 11, 15), engineering (tracks 11, 15), percussion (track 11), keyboards (track 15)
- Adam Comstock – engineering (tracks 1, 10–12, 15), recording (track 2), guitar (track 15)
- Juan Carlos Torrado – recording assistance (tracks 3, 6, 8, 13), engineering assistance (tracks 6, 13), tracking assistance (track 8)
- Benny Blanco – production, programming & instrumentation (tracks 2, 4)
- Stargate – production (tracks 4, 5, 16), programming & instrumentation (track 4), vocal production (track 16)
- Dreamlab – vocal production (tracks 5–7, 9, 14, 16)
- Leah Haywood – background vocals (tracks 5–7, 9, 16)
- Tony Maserati – mixing (tracks 6, 7, 9, 13, 14)
- Tyler Scott – mixing assistance (tracks 6, 7, 9, 13, 14)
- Max Martin – programming, vocal production, percussion & synths (track 3)
- Julia Michaels – background vocals (tracks 3, 8, 13), vocal production (track 13)
- Hector Delgado – co-production, vocal production, mixing & recording (track 6)
- Nick Monson – production (tracks 6, 13), programming & instrumentation (track 13)
- Christopher Braide – production, programming, instrumentation & grand piano (track 7)
- Miles Walker – engineering, recording, vocal production & tracking (track 16)
- Dubkiller – programming (tracks 1, 15), additional production (track 1)
- Danny Parra – engineering (tracks 1, 10), percussion (track 10)
- Serban Ghenea – mixing (tracks 2, 3, 8)
- John Hanes – mix engineering (tracks 2, 3, 8)
- Benjamin Rice – engineering, recording & additional vocal production (track 13)
- Felix Snow – production, programming & instrumentation (track 14)
- Hazebanga – programming (tracks 1, 10)
- Zvi Edelman – production coordination (tracks 2, 4)
- Seif Hussain – production coordination (tracks 2, 4)
- Andrew Luftman – production coordination (tracks 2, 4)
- Astrid Taylor – production coordination (tracks 2, 4)
- Chris Sclafani – engineering & recording (track 4)
- Simon French – engineering assistance & recording assistance (track 4)
- Blake Mares – engineering assistance & recording assistance (track 4)
- Tim Blacksmith – executive production (tracks 4, 5)
- Danny D – executive production (tracks 4, 5)
- Mikkel Eriksen – recording & instruments (track 5)
- Phil Tan – mixing (tracks 5, 16)
- Daniela Rivera – additional mix engineering assistance (tracks 5, 16)
- A$AP Rocky – vocals & co-production (track 6)
- J.B. Saboia – mixing assistance & recording assistance (track 6)
- Steve Mac – production & keyboards (track 9)
- Chris Laws – engineering & drums (track 9)
- Shane Stevens – vocal production & background vocals (track 13)
- Jamie Muhoberac – keyboards (track 1)
- R3drum – additional production (track 2)
- Phil Seaford – mix engineering assistance (track 2)
- Mark "Spike" Stent – mixing (track 4)
- Matty Green – mixing assistance (track 4)
- Geoff Swan – mixing assistance (track 4)
- Mike Anderson – recording (track 5)
- Tor Hermansen – instruments (track 5)
- Nolan Lambroza – production (track 6)
- Will Sandalls – engineering (track 7)
- Ross Golan – background vocals (track 9)
- Dan Pursey – engineering assistance (track 9)
- Brandon "Casanova" Hodge – guitar (track 10)
- João Pedro Mourão – guitar (track 10)
- Jimmy Messer – guitar (track 12)
- Tim Pierce – guitar (track 12)
- Rami Jaffee – keyboards (track 12)
- Serafin Aguilar – trumpet (track 12)
- David Urquidi – saxophone (track 12)
- Frank Dukes – additional production (track 15)
- Donkey Boy – production (track 16)

Credits

- Selena Gomez – executive production
- Aaron Bay-Schuck – Interscope A&R direction
- Lexi Opper – Interscope A&R coordination
- Marta Navas – Interscope A&R administration
- Matt LaMotte – Interscope marketing
- Gary Kelly – Interscope sales
- Chris Mortimer – Interscope digital marketing
- Hillary Siskind – Interscope publicity
- Michelle An – Interscope video
- Stephanie Hsu – Interscope creative
- Tracy Kies – Interscope business affairs
- Brian Roettinger – art direction & design
- Ryan Butler – graphic design
- Taylor Giali – art direction assistance & design assistance
- Renata Raksha – photography
- Chris Gehringer – mastering
- Aleen Keshishian – management
- Zack Morgenroth – management
- Sara Newkirk Simon – agent
- John Marx – agent
- British Reece – publicist
- Ziffren Brittenham – legal

== Charts ==
=== Weekly charts ===
Weekly chart performance for Revival
Chart (2015–16)	Peak position
Argentine Albums (CAPIF)	5
Australian Albums (ARIA)	3
Austrian Albums (Ö3 Austria)	13
Belgian Albums (Ultratop Flanders)	6
Belgian Albums (Ultratop Wallonia)	8
Brazilian Albums (ABPD)	3
Canadian Albums (Billboard)	2
Croatian International Albums (HDU)	3
Czech Albums (ČNS IFPI)	15
Danish Albums (Hitlisten)	6
Dutch Albums (Album Top 100)	6
Finnish Albums (Suomen virallinen lista)	17
French Albums (SNEP)	8
German Albums (Offizielle Top 100)	12
Greek Albums (IFPI)	1
Hungarian Albums (MAHASZ)	38
Irish Albums (IRMA)	9
Italian Albums (FIMI)	8
Japanese Albums (Oricon)	37
Mexican Albums (AMPROFON)	3
New Zealand Albums (RMNZ)	2
Norwegian Albums (VG-lista)	2
Polish Albums (ZPAV)	48
Portuguese Albums (AFP)	3
Scottish Albums (Official Charts)	14
South Korean Albums (Gaon)	88
South Korean International Albums (Gaon)	16
Spanish Albums (Promusicae)	6
Swedish Albums (Sverigetopplistan)	8
Swiss Albums (Schweizer Hitparade)	10
Swiss Albums (Romandie)	6
Taiwanese Albums (Five Music)	2
UK Albums (OCC)	11
US Billboard 200	1

=== Year-end charts ===
2015 year-end chart performance for Revival
Chart (2015)	Position
Belgian Albums (Ultratop Flanders)	193
Danish Albums (Hitlisten)	78
Mexican Albums (AMPROFON)	60
US Billboard 200	137

2016 year-end chart performance for Revival
Chart (2016)	Position
Belgian Albums (Ultratop Flanders)	138
Canadian Albums (Billboard)	12
Danish Albums (Hitlisten)	20
Dutch Albums (MegaCharts)	100
French Albums (SNEP)	119
Greek Albums (IFPI)	7
Mexican Albums (AMPROFON)	63
Swedish Albums (Sverigetopplistan)	26
US Billboard 200	18

== Certifications ==
Certifications and sales for Revival
Region	Certification	Certified units/sales
Australia (ARIA)	Platinum	70,000^{‡}
Austria (IFPI Austria)	Platinum	15,000^{*}
Brazil (Pro-Música Brasil) Deluxe	3× Platinum	120,000^{‡}
Canada (Music Canada)	Gold	40,000^{^}
Chile	Gold	5,000
Denmark (IFPI Danmark)	2× Platinum	40,000^{‡}
Mexico (AMPROFON)	2× Platinum+Gold	150,000^{^}
New Zealand (RMNZ)	2× Platinum	30,000^{‡}
Norway (IFPI Norway)	3× Platinum	60,000^{‡}
Poland (ZPAV)	Platinum	20,000^{‡}
Singapore (RIAS)	Platinum	10,000^{*}
Sweden (GLF)	Platinum	40,000^{‡}
United Kingdom (BPI)	Gold	100,000^{‡}
United States (RIAA)	Platinum	1,000,000^{‡}
^{*} Sales figures based on certification alone.^{^} Shipments figures based on certification alone.^{‡} Sales+streaming figures based on certification alone.

== Release history ==
List of release dates, showing region, versions, formats, labels, and references
Region	Date	Version	Format	Label	Ref.
United States	October 9, 2015	Standard; deluxe	CD; digital download	Interscope	
Japan	October 16, 2015	Deluxe	CD; DVD	Universal	
United States	December 4, 2015	Deluxe	Box set	Interscope	
United States	December 4, 2015	Standard; deluxe	LP	Interscope	
