= Revival Tour =

2016 concert tour by Selena Gomez

- Tour by Selena Gomez
- Location: North America • Asia • Oceania
- Associated album: Revival
- Start date: May 6, 2016
- End date: August 13, 2016
- Legs: 3
- No. of shows: 43 in North America; 7 in Asia; 5 in Oceania; 55 in total
- Attendance: 541,444
- Box office: $35.6 million ($46.76 million in 2025 dollars)

Selena Gomez concert chronology
- Stars Dance Tour (2013); Revival Tour (2016)

The Revival Tour was the second solo concert tour by American singer Selena Gomez, in support of her second solo studio album, Revival (2015). The tour began in Las Vegas, Nevada, at the Mandalay Bay Events Center on May 6, 2016. The tour was projected to end on December 18, 2016, in Zapopan, Mexico at the Telmex Auditorium, but due to Gomez's problems and side effects with lupus, it was interrupted earlier on August 13, 2016 in Auckland, New Zealand, at the Vector Arena.

== Background and development ==
On October 1, 2015, Gomez announced that she would be begin touring North America in late spring of the following year in support of her album Revival (2015). When discussing the tour in a video posted to her fans on Instagram, Gomez stated:

I have a very exciting announcement: I am launching my Revival World Tour. I will be going through the US and Canada from May to July and then later in the year going overseas.

She also announced that fans could purchase a Revival bundle with early ticket access. In a statement to Entertainment Weekly, Gomez stated:

I am ready to get back on the road and see my fans in person! This album marks a new and very important chapter in my life. I cannot wait to get on stage and perform this new material.

The first leg took place in North America across the United States and Canada. The leg ran from May to July 2016. DNCE served as the main opening act in North America with the exception of Vancouver, Winnipeg, Ottawa, and Anaheim. Bea Miller opened from May 6, 2016, through June 15, 2016, and July 9, 2016, Tyler Shaw opened in Vancouver, Winnipeg, and Ottawa, Bahari opened from June 17, 2016, through July 8, 2016, and Charlie Puth opened in Anaheim. On March 15, 2016, Quebec City Summer Festival 2016 announced Gomez as a main headliner of the festival in Quebec City.

The second leg took place across Asia. Announcements for the Asia leg was announced through each city individually rather than one big announcement. The leg ran from July 23, 2016, through August 3, 2016. Opening acts included Gentle Bones in Singapore, Jai Waetford in Bangkok, Darren Espanto in Manila, and DNCE returning as an opening act in Tokyo. Gomez was scheduled to perform her very first shows in China, but reports came out that she was allegedly banned by Chinese authorities due to support of Dalai Lama. The third leg took place across Oceania. The leg ran from August 6, 2016, through August 13, 2016. DNCE returned once again as the opening act for Oceania.

Gomez had plans to tour across Europe and Latin America, but cancelled, citing anxiety and depression caused by lupus.

== Accolades ==
List of accolades awarded to the Revival Tour
Ceremony	Year	Category	Result	Ref.
Radio Disney Music Awards	2017	Favorite Tour	Won	
Teen Choice Awards	2016	Choice Music – Tour	Nominated	
Webby Awards	2017	Celebrity/Fan — Social Content and Marketing	Nominated	

== Set list ==
This set list is representative of the show on July 5, 2016, in Phoenix. It is not representative of all concerts for the duration of the tour.

1. "Revival"
2. "Same Old Love"
3. "Come & Get It"
4. "Sober"
5. "The Heart Wants What It Wants" (intermission)
6. "Good for You"
7. "Survivors"
8. "Slow Down"
9. "Love You like a Love Song"
10. "Hands to Myself"
11. "Who Says"
12. "Transfiguration" / "Nobody"
13. "Feel Me"
14. "Me & My Girls"
15. "Me & the Rhythm"
16. "Body Heat"
17. "Sweet Dreams (Are Made of This)"
18. "Kill Em With Kindness"
19. "I Want You to Know"
20. "Revival" (remix)

=== Notes ===
- During the show in Miami, Gomez dedicated "Transfiguration" and "Nobody" to Christina Grimmie. Grimmie died on June 10, 2016, of gunshot wounds inflicted in an attack following her concert performance in Orlando.
- During the show in New Orleans, Gomez dedicated "Transfiguration" to the victims affected by the 2016 Orlando nightclub shooting.
- During the show in Anaheim, Charlie Puth joined Gomez to perform "We Don't Talk Anymore".

== Shows ==
List of concerts, showing date, city, country, venue, opening act, tickets sold, number of available tickets and amount of gross revenue
Date	City	Country	Venue	Attendance	Revenue
North America – Leg 1
May 6	Las Vegas	United States	Mandalay Bay Events Center	8,471 / 8,835	$589,890
May 8	Fresno	United States	Save Mart Center	8,269 / 10,141	$558,576
May 10	Sacramento	United States	Sleep Train Arena	9,386 / 14,615	$554,935
May 11	San Jose	United States	SAP Center	8,954 / 12,036	$667,340
May 13	Seattle	United States	KeyArena	10,363 / 10,690	$714,660
May 14	Vancouver	Canada	Rogers Arena	11,065 / 11,065	$709,038
May 16	Edmonton	Canada	Rexall Place	9,131 / 13,051	$543,719
May 17	Calgary	Canada	Scotiabank Saddledome	7,480 / 12,012	$440,055
May 19	Saskatoon	Canada	SaskTel Centre	4,913 / 5,893	$305,943
May 20	Winnipeg	Canada	MTS Centre	6,064 / 9,384	$343,655
May 22 (Note: The concert of May 22, 2016 in Ottawa at the Canadian Tire Centre was originally planned to take place on May 25, but was rescheduled to May 22 to avoid any potential conflict with the Toronto Raptors playoff game.)	Ottawa	Canada	Canadian Tire Centre	5,502 / 9,573	$357,126
May 23	London	Canada	Budweiser Gardens	7,948 / 8,635	$488,500
May 25 (Note: The concert of May 25, 2016 in Toronto at the Air Canada Centre was originally planned to take place on May 22, but was rescheduled to May 25 to avoid any potential conflict with the Toronto Raptors playoff game.)	Toronto	Canada	Air Canada Centre	13,203 / 13,203	$774,585
May 26	Montreal	Canada	Bell Centre	10,216 / 11,428	$567,572
May 28	Boston	United States	TD Garden	12,545 / 13,929	$798,495
May 29	Uncasville	United States	Mohegan Sun Arena	7,105 / 7,105	$465,290
June 1	New York City	United States	Barclays Center	11,228 / 12,617	$840,558
June 2	Newark	United States	Prudential Center	10,330 / 11,013	$698,001
June 4	Washington, D.C.	United States	Verizon Center	10,021 / 12,822	$668,009
June 5	Cincinnati	United States	U.S. Bank Arena	6,395 / 7,651	$401,055
June 7	Charlotte	United States	Time Warner Cable Arena	6,615 / 10,278	$402,200
June 9	Atlanta	United States	Philips Arena	6,079 / 8,802	$450,938
June 10	Orlando	United States	Amway Center	9,389 / 9,600	$639,745
June 11	Miami	United States	American Airlines Arena	9,595 / 11,013	$637,010
June 14	New Orleans	United States	Smoothie King Center	9,062 / 9,062	$612,718
June 15	Houston	United States	Toyota Center	7,520 / 11,390	$642,485
June 17	Austin	United States	Frank Erwin Center	7,707 / 10,328	$519,396
June 18	Dallas	United States	American Airlines Center	11,171 / 17,430	$834,521
June 19	Tulsa	United States	BOK Center	7,487 / 7,999	$528,235
June 21	Nashville	United States	Bridgestone Arena	7,162 / 13,615	$438,130
June 22	Louisville	United States	KFC Yum! Center	6,575 / 14,728	$440,749
June 24	Auburn Hills	United States	The Palace of Auburn Hills	8,037 / 9,108	$583,971
June 25	Chicago	United States	United Center	9,810 / 14,333	$703,300
June 26	St. Louis	United States	Scottrade Center	7,181 / 8,000	$448,623
June 28	St. Paul	United States	Xcel Energy Center	8,571 / 10,498	$512,991
June 29 (Note: The concert of June 29, 2016, in Milwaukee, Wisconsin at the Marcus Amphitheater is a part of the Summerfest 2016.)	Milwaukee	United States	Marcus Amphitheater	25,000/ 25,000	$325,000
July 1	Kansas City	United States	Sprint Center	9,781 / 9,781	$561,296
July 2	Denver	United States	Pepsi Center	7,429 / 15,600	$491,572
July 5	Phoenix	United States	Talking Stick Resort Arena	8,977 / 11,451	$522,030
July 6	San Diego	United States	Valley View Casino Center	7,464 / 10,126	$530,535
July 8	Los Angeles	United States	Staples Center	13,239 / 13,239	$963,518
July 9	Anaheim	United States	Honda Center	10,176 / 11,434	$769,533
July 11 (Note: The concert of July 11, 2016, in Canada, Quebec City at the Plains of Abraham is a part of the Quebec City Summer Festival 2016.)	Quebec City	Canada	Plains of Abraham	(Festival)	
Asia – Leg 2
July 23	Jakarta	Indonesia	Indonesia Convention Exhibition	5,001 / 5,001	$498,051
July 25	Shah Alam	Malaysia	Malawati Stadium	7,892 / 7,892	$498,300
July 27	Singapore		Singapore Indoor Stadium	6,023 / 6,023	$501,875
July 29	Bangkok	Thailand	Impact Arena	8,042 / 8,042	$543,988
July 31	Manila	Philippines	Mall of Asia Arena	11,505 / 11,505	$796,554
August 2	Tokyo	Japan	Tokyo International Forum	5,009 / 5,009	$598,091
August 3	Tokyo	Japan	Tokyo International Forum	5,009 / 5,009	$598,091
Oceania – Leg 3
August 6	Melbourne	Australia	Margaret Court Arena	10,825 / 10,825	$706,009
August 7	Melbourne	Australia	Margaret Court Arena	10,825 / 10,825	$706,009
August 9	Sydney	Australia	Qudos Bank Arena	9,493 / 9,493	$640,219
August 11	Brisbane	Australia	Brisbane Entertainment Centre	5,026 / 5,026	$366,508
August 13	Auckland	New Zealand	Vector Arena	7,814 / 8,159	$475,780
Total				482.613 (82.84%)	$35,6M

== Cancelled shows ==
List of cancelled concerts, showing date, city, country, venue and reason for cancellation
Date (2016)	City	Country	Venue	Reason
August 6	Guangzhou	China	Guangzhou Sports Arena	Unknown (Note: Although no official reason was given, NewsFix says that Gomez was banned by Chinese authorities due to support of the Dalai Lama.)
August 8	Shanghai	China	Mercedes-Benz Arena	Unknown
September 3 (Note: The concert of September 3, 2016, in Paradise at the Paradise Park Amphitheater was a part of AtlanticFest2016.)	Paradise	Canada	Paradise Park Amphitheater	Side effects of lupus
September 4 (Note: The concert of September 4, 2016, in Moncton at Moncton Stadium was a part of AtlanticFest2016.)	Moncton	Canada	Moncton Stadium	Side effects of lupus
September 24 (Note: The concert of September 24, 2016, in New York City at Central Park was a part of Global Citizen Festival. Demi Lovato replaced Gomez as headliner.)	New York City	United States	Central Park	Side effects of lupus
October 10	Helsinki	Finland	Hartwall Arena	Side effects of lupus
October 12	Stockholm	Sweden	Ericsson Globe	Side effects of lupus
October 13	Oslo	Norway	Oslo Spektrum	Side effects of lupus
October 15	Copenhagen	Denmark	Forum Copenhagen	Side effects of lupus
October 17	Cologne	Germany	Lanxess Arena	Side effects of lupus
October 18	Amsterdam	Netherlands	Ziggo Dome	Side effects of lupus
October 19	Paris	France	AccorHotels Arena	Side effects of lupus
October 22	Esch-sur-Alzette	Luxembourg	Rockhal	Side effects of lupus
October 24	Prague	Czech Republic	O_{2} Arena Prague	Side effects of lupus
October 26	Milan	Italy	Mediolanum Forum	Side effects of lupus
October 28	Munich	Germany	Olympiahalle	Side effects of lupus
October 29	Zürich	Switzerland	Hallenstadion	Side effects of lupus
October 31	Frankfurt	Germany	Festhalle	Side effects of lupus
November 1	Antwerp	Belgium	Sportpaleis	Side effects of lupus
November 3	Manchester	England	Manchester Arena	Side effects of lupus
November 4	London	England	The O_{2} Arena	Side effects of lupus
November 6	Birmingham	England	Genting Arena	Side effects of lupus
November 8	Dublin	Ireland	3Arena	Side effects of lupus
November 10	Glasgow	Scotland	SSE Hydro	Side effects of lupus
November 14	Madrid	Spain	Barclaycard Center	Side effects of lupus
November 16	Lisbon	Portugal	MEO Arena	Side effects of lupus
November 18	Dubai	United Arab Emirates	Autism Rocks Arena	Side effects of lupus
December 1	Santiago	Chile	Movistar Arena	Side effects of lupus
December 3 (Note: The concert of December 3, 2016, in Buenos Aires at Indoor Stadium is a part of Shout Festival.)	Buenos Aires	Argentina	Tecnópolis Arena	Side effects of lupus
December 6	Curitiba	Brazil	Expo Unimed	Side effects of lupus
December 8	Brasília	Brazil	Net Live	Side effects of lupus
December 10 (Note: The concert of December 10, 2016, in São Paulo at Allianz Parque is a part of Z Festival. Demi Lovato is set to replace Gomez.)	São Paulo	Brazil	Allianz Parque	Side effects of lupus
December 11	Rio de Janeiro	Brazil	HSBC Arena	Side effects of lupus
December 14	Mexico City	Mexico	Mexico City Arena	Side effects of lupus
December 16	Monterrey	Mexico	Monterrey Arena	Side effects of lupus
December 18	Zapopan	Mexico	Telmex Auditorium	Side effects of lupus
