= Same Old Love =

2015 single by Selena Gomez

Single by Selena Gomez

from the album Revival
- Released: September 10, 2015
- Recorded: February 2015
- Studio: Westlake Studios (Los Angeles, California); Dreamlab Studios (Studio City, California)
- Genre: Electropop; synth-pop
- Length: 3:49
- Label: Interscope
- Songwriters: Tor Hermansen; Mikkel Eriksen; Benjamin Levin; Charlotte Aitchison; Ross Golan
- Producers: Stargate; Benny Blanco

Selena Gomez singles chronology
"Good for You" (2015)	"Same Old Love" (2015)	"Hands to Myself" (2016)

Music video
- "Same Old Love" on YouTube

"Same Old Love" is a song by American singer Selena Gomez from her second studio album, Revival (2015). The song was written by Charli XCX, Ross Golan, and its producers Stargate and Benny Blanco. The song was released as the second single from Revival on September 10, 2015, to contemporary hit radio. It was initially composed by Charli XCX with Stargate and later recorded by Gomez without the former in the studio at the time.

"Same Old Love" is a midtempo electropop and synth-pop song backed by a wonky piano loop, a finger-click beat and Italo disco synths. In the song, Gomez uses a forceful, emotive tone and a raspy delivery that are both uncharacteristic for her, accompanied by Charli XCX's background adlibs. According to Gomez, the lyrics are a representation of various stages of different relationships and are about getting rid of everything toxic in her life, also inspired by her relationship with her father.

Several remixes were commissioned for its release, including an official remix featuring rapper Fetty Wap. Music critics mostly complimented its catchy tune and understated, moody sound. The song peaked at number five on the US Billboard Hot 100, marking Gomez's fourth top ten and second consecutive top five single from the album. "Same Old Love" also reached number one on the US Pop Airplay chart and the top ten in Canada, the Czech Republic, and Slovakia.

"Same Old Love" was accompanied by a music video directed by Michael Haussman and filmed in the Broadway Theater District of Los Angeles. It premiered as an Apple Music exclusive on September 22, 2015, and was released on Gomez's Vevo channel on October 7, 2015. The video was well received by critics who complimented Gomez's styling and the emotional storyline. It was inspired by Gomez's relationships with her loved ones and fans. It featured Gomez witnessing several dramatic vignettes on the streets of Los Angeles and performing at a theater. Gomez promoted "Same Old Love" with several televised performances, including on The Ellen DeGeneres Show, The Tonight Show Starring Jimmy Fallon, and at the 2015 American Music Awards.

== Background and release ==
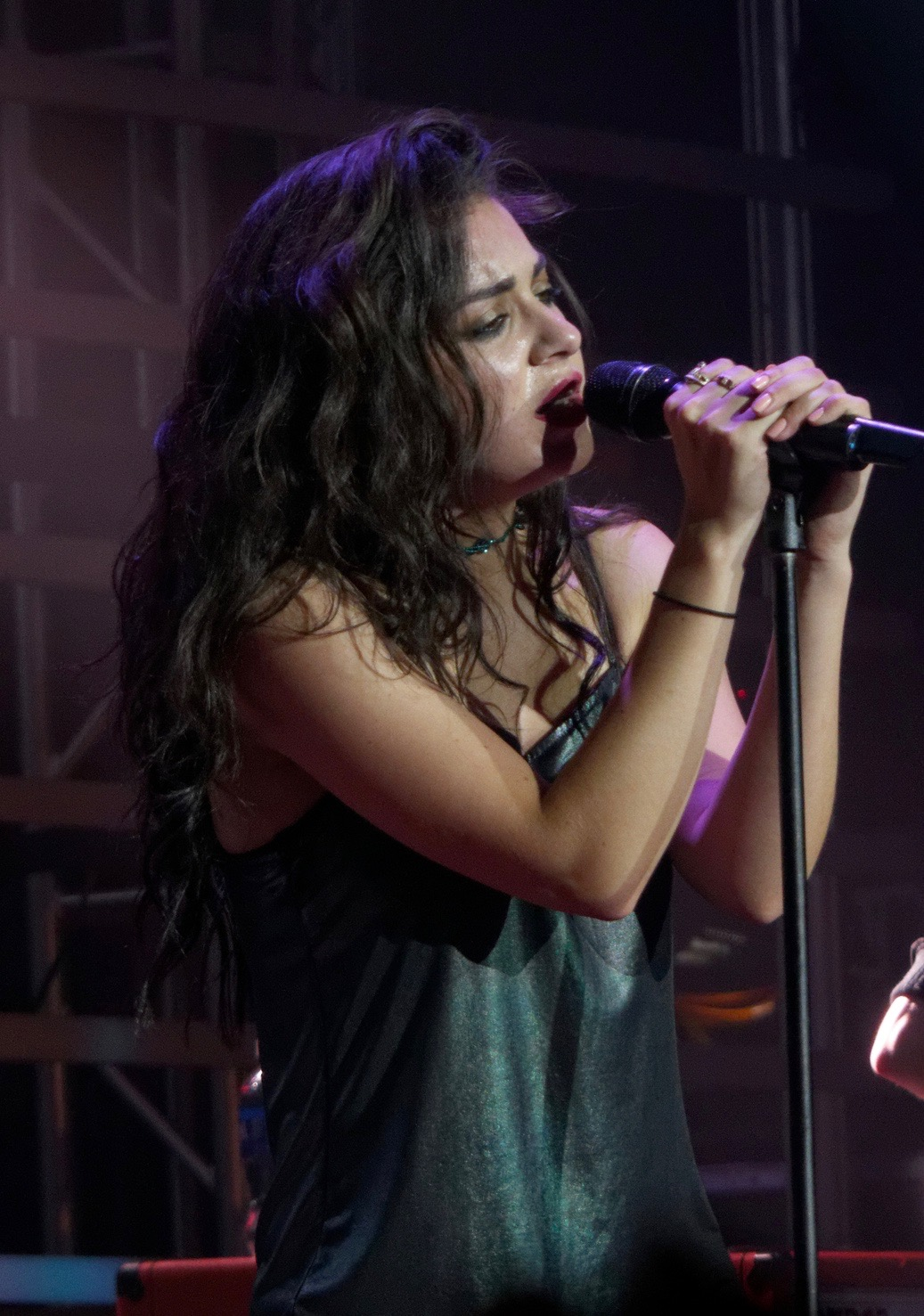
The lyrics to "Same Old Love" were written by Charli XCX (pictured) who also contributed with backing vocals during the chorus.

"Same Old Love" was written by British singer Charli XCX and Norwegian production team Stargate. During a recording session for Selena Gomez's 2015 studio album Revival, Stargate presented the track to Gomez, who acceded and subsequently recorded it. Charli XCX was not at the session, although her manager was present throughout the song's recording process. The final composition featured additional writing from Ross Golan, and Benny Blanco who also produced the song with Stargate. Gomez was drawn to the song as she was a fan of Charli XCX's music and cited an emotional connection with its lyrics. She believed "Same Old Love" represented her strained relationship with her father and how his relationship with her reflected on her subsequent romantic relationships. "I think that's where it started, and all the actions that happened are almost similar to what I was going through," she explained. The song's recording sessions took place at Westlake Studios in Los Angeles, and Dreamlab Studios in Studio City, California. The song was initially intended for Barbadian singer Rihanna's then-upcoming album, Anti (2016), and who shared the track's "I'm so sick of that same old love" line on Twitter in June 2014.

"I think 'Same Old Love' represents a different kind of identity with love. The first people you love in your life are your parents. So for me, my dad is the first male figure I had in my life. And how much it means to respect your parents and have a healthy relationship with them because it trails on into your relationships when you're older."

— Gomez's interpretation of "Same Old Love"

Gomez first announced "Same Old Love" as the second single from Revival on August 5, 2015, at the iHeartMedia summit—a forum for labels to preview their upcoming material to radio management. She teased the song in a clip shared on Instagram on September 4, 2015. "Same Old Love" premiered on Vevo on September 9, 2015. The single was released on September 10, 2015, as an instant gratification track to accompany digital pre-orders of Revival. In the US, "Same Old Love" impacted contemporary hit radio on October 6, 2015, and rhythmic contemporary radio on October 20, 2015. A digital remix bundle was released on November 20, 2015; it featured a remix by Israeli DJ Borgore. An official remix featuring rapper Fetty Wap was digitally released on January 8, 2016. It features Wap sing-rapping two new verses (and eight bars combined) at the beginning and near the end of the track. The remix was well received by critics, who praised Wap's performance in contrast with the song's theme.

== Composition ==
Musically, "Same Old Love" is an electropop, synth-pop song that contains elements of pop-punk, jazz, snap and trap music, as well as Italo disco synths. In terms of music notation, "Same Old Love" was composed using 4/4 common time in the key of B minor, with a moderate tempo of 96–100 beats per minute. The song's verses are resigned and have a quaint 1960s sound, laden with a simple, wonky piano loop and a sparse, finger-click beat. The loop alternates between sequences of Bm–A and Em–D in the first verse, while in the second verse it changes to the three-chord progression of Bm–Em-F♯. A bassline snaps at the chorus, pertaining to a more dance-indebted sound, with a four-chord sequence of Bm–G–Em–A.

Using an uncharacteristically forceful, emotive tone and raspy delivery, Gomez belts the hook, "I'm so sick of that same old love / That shit it tears me up / I'm so sick of that same old love / My body's had enough." On the choral comedown, Charli XCX prominently accompanies Gomez with gritty background vocals, "Oh / Oh / Oh". Their vocals range between the notes A_{3} and C♯_{5}. Lyrically, "Same Old Love" is a torch song. According to Gomez, the lyrics are a representation of various stages of different relationships and are about getting rid of everything toxic in her life. The lyrics also express a sense of growth, "Take away your things and go / You can't take back what you said... / I'm not spending any time, wasting tonight on you."

== Critical reception ==
Joe Levy of Rolling Stone suggested that the track "may be carving out a role for [Gomez] as a pop torch singer", describing it as "moody and catchy without being obvious". In comparison with Gomez's previous single "Good for You", Joe Coscarelli of The New York Times viewed "Same Old Love" as the more obvious single choice. Nolan Feeney of Time quipped, "'Same old' pop song this is not". Emily Mackay from The Observer found the song's understated sound "most surprising [...], despite the hit-making co-writers", deeming it a winning collaboration. Kevin O'Donnell of Entertainment Weekly said the song's "simple approach shines through". AllMusic's Tim Sendra praised the "snappy, sassy" sound of "Same Old Love", and felt it did "a fine job" at straying from a formula he felt was common in most of Gomez's music. In a review for ABC News, Allan Raible opined that the song "gets better with each repeated listen" and complimented Gomez's "convincing level of sincerity". Stereogum called it "the best Gwen Stefani song of 2015" and placed it at number 41 on their list of The 50 Best Pop Songs of 2015.

Some reviewers were less favorable. USA Today critic Elysa Gardner viewed the track as "crisp but generic". Dave Hanratty of Drowned in Sound found the song engaging, but was critical of Charli XCX "[dominating it] entirely", calling it a leftover from her 2014 album Sucker. Similarly, Slant Magazine's Sal Cinquemani felt the track lacked originality, noting that it was "dominated by the unmistakable presence of Charli XCX". Mikael Wood from the Los Angeles Times opined that "Same Old Love" was a bold borrowing from Charli XCX's music. Conversely, Michael Cragg of The Guardian said, "Regardless of its history, and who may or may not be singing what, 'Same Old Love' is ludicrously catchy and oddly brutal."

== Chart performance ==
"Same Old Love" debuted at number 43 on the US Billboard Hot 100 chart issued for October 3, 2015. Following Gomez's performance of the song at the 2015 American Music Awards on November 22, 2015, it rose from number 13 to number 11, selling 81,000 copies with a 74% increase in sales. It was the single that benefited the most sales-wise from a performance at the ceremony, according to Billboard. "Same Old Love" climbed to a new peak of number six on the chart dated January 2, 2016. It marked Gomez's fourth US top 10 single, consequently making Revival her first album to spawn multiple top 10 singles. On the chart issue dated January 30, 2016, the song moved to a new peak of number five, becoming the singer's highest-charting song at the time, along with the previous single "Good for You", which peaked at the same position. "Same Old Love" also became Gomez's sixth top-ten and second number one single on the US Mainstream Top 40 chart, and third top-five single on the US Dance/Mix Show Airplay chart where it peaked at number four. (Note: Gomez's previous two top-five singles on this chart were "Naturally" (credited to Gomez's band Selena Gomez & the Scene) and "I Want You to Know" (a single by Zedd featuring Gomez).) After spending nine weeks in the top 10 of the chart, the song dropped eight–15 on the chart issue dated February 20, 2016.

"Same Old Love" debuted at number 36 on the Canadian Hot 100 chart for the week ending October 3, 2015. In its fourteenth charting week, the song moved to its peak spot at number six, and was subsequently certified gold by Music Canada for sales of over 40,000 copies. In Australia, "Same Old Love" entered at number 42 on the ARIA Singles Chart dated September 27, 2015, and later reached a peak of number 33. The song peaked at number 81, and spent six weeks on the UK Singles Chart, under performing in this region compared to its successor and predecessor. Elsewhere, "Same Old Love" reached the top 10 in the Czech Republic and Slovakia.

== Music video ==
=== Background ===
The accompanying music video for "Same Old Love" was directed by Michael Haussman and filmed in the Broadway Theater District of Los Angeles. Filming took place during the evenings of September 15–16, 2015. According to Gomez, the concept was to portray her interpretation of the song's lyrics; a representation of various stages of different relationships. For this reason, she wanted Haussman to translate emotion and cinematography in a fluid storyline. Regarding the video's inspiration, Haussman explained, "I think that [Gomez's] inspiration is kind of seeing that and all of humanity and feel like, 'OK, I'm not the only one'". He initially planned for Gomez's scenes to be shot entirely in a car, but later felt this would disconnect from her intended interpretation and found inspiration from singer Tony Bennett who was known for walking to his concerts.

Gomez invited 800 fans to the district's Palace Theater for a special Revival event where they were surprised by also being cast in the final stage performance scene of the video. She wanted this scene to emulate what inspires and motivates her in life. In an interview for Billboard, Gomez explained, "The number one priority when it comes to anything I do is my fans...we wanted this ending to be really cool and interactive in a way". Haussman initially planned to omit the scenes with fans and use it as a bonus video instead, but liked how the scene came out in the end. The fans' reactions were filmed the day after Gomez's stage performance so Haussman could shoot close-ups of Gomez without obstructing their view. Haussman used a sequinned stage curtain to resemble the rain-soaked car window segment. He began the film editing, but had to travel to Europe, subsequently completing the final in the US. The music video was premiered as an Apple Music exclusive on September 22, 2015. It was released on YouTube on October 7, 2015.

=== Synopsis ===
Gomez making her way by foot through the Broadway Theater District of Los Angeles in a scene inspired by Tony Bennett

The video begins with Gomez donning a little black dress underneath an oversize ivory sweater, leaving a hotel and climbing into the backseat of a black car. Driving through the streets of Los Angeles, she looks out from the car's rain-soaked window. Gomez briefly witnesses several public vignettes: including a distressed mother and her son, an infuriated man venting his anger, and a couple kissing.

The car then stops at a theater where Gomez sneaks into a nightclub to escape the paparazzi and her management who search for her. She then walks around the city where she encounters more public vignettes: a gay couple and their baby, and a daughter staring into a fish tank near her sleeping father. Seemingly inspired by the vignettes, she makes her way to the theater to perform a live show. Gomez appears on stage after a curtain lifts, greeted by hundreds of fans. The video ends with Gomez performing the rest of the song for the audience.

=== Reception ===
Karen Mizoguchi of People quipped, "'Same Old Love' but definitely not the same 'ole gal!", concluding: "Gomez's two careers collide as a bit of old Hollywood movie magic and her sultry voice make for one glamorous video." Madeline Roth from MTV News deemed the music video "sexy" and "sophisticated", highlighting its themes of Hollywood glamour and suspense. Similarly, Glamour writer Lynsey Eidell commented: "The video for 'Same Old Love' continues to show off Gomez's sophisticated and sultry side—but it also comes with a pretty awesome backstory." Colin Stutz of Billboard felt it was inspired by "all the world's love and heartache". InStyle's Kelsey Glein praised the visual's "emotional" and "moody vibe", as well as Gomez's "simply stunning" appearance. Zach Dionne of Fuse opined that the music video showcased Gomez "in a new light". Alyssa Bailey from Elle viewed it as "a pretty, lonely, vaguely Britney Spears 'Lucky'-ish look into the world of a pop star".

== Live performances ==
Gomez gave the first televised performance of "Same Old Love" on The Ellen DeGeneres Show on October 9, 2015. On October 12, 2015, she performed "Same Old Love" on The Today Show, along with "Good for You" and a medley of "Come & Get It" and "Me & the Rhythm". She also performed the song on The Tonight Show Starring Jimmy Fallon on October 14, 2015. Gomez gave a live rendition of the track for BBC's Children in Need telethon on November 14, 2015.

On November 22, 2015, Gomez performed "Same Old Love" at the American Music Awards flanked by a bevy of tuxedo-clad male dancers on a cabaret-themed stage with an illuminated staircase and disco balls. Billboard wrote, "Gomez's set offered the night's most eye candy", while Entertainment Weekly said "Gomez delivered what might have been the sultriest performance of the night". Brittany Spanos of Rolling Stone called it a "stylish performance". The song was included as part of Gomez's set list for iHeartRadio's Jingle Ball Tour throughout December 2015. As the musical guest on Saturday Night Live on January 23, 2016, Gomez performed a medley of "Good for You" and "Same Old Love". The song was also included on Gomez's Revival Tour in 2016.

== Cover versions and usage in media ==
On October 21, 2015, Spencer Sutherland covered "Same Old Love" in a video shot and produced by Emblem3's Keaton Stromberg. Sam Tsui, Alyson Stoner and Kurt Schneider released a one-take choreographed cover video of the song on October 22, 2015. In January 2016, Alessia Cara performed an acoustic version on Elvis Duran and the Morning Show. "Same Old Love" is featured in the dance video game Just Dance 2016.

== Formats and track listings ==
- Digital download
1. "Same Old Love" – 3:49
- Digital download (Remixes)
1. "Same Old Love" (Borgore Remix) [feat. Borgore] – 4:16
2. "Same Old Love" (Filous Remix) – 4:16
3. "Same Old Love" (Wuki Remix) – 4:39
4. "Same Old Love" (Romos Remix) – 4:59
- Digital download (Grey Remix)
1. "Same Old Love" (Grey Remix) – 2:52
- Digital download (Remix)
1. "Same Old Love" (Remix) [feat. Fetty Wap] – 3:24
- CD single
1. "Same Old Love" – 3:49
2. "Same Old Love" (Borgore Remix) [feat. Borgore] – 4:16
3. "Same Old Love" (Filous Remix) – 4:16
4. "Same Old Love" (Wuki Remix) – 4:39
5. "Same Old Love" (Romos Remix) – 4:59

== Credits and personnel ==
Credits and personnel adapted from Revival album liner notes.

Recording

- Recorded and tracked at Westlake Recording Studios (Los Angeles, California) and Dreamlab Studios (Studio City, Califórnia)
- Vocals engineered at Westlake Recording Studios (Los Angeles, California) and Dreamlab Studios (Studio City, California)
- Mixed at Mixsuite UK/LA
- Mastered at Sterling Sound (New York City, New York)

Management

- Published by EMI April Music (ASCAP) on behalf of EMI Music Publishing LTD (PRS), Matza Ballzack Music/Where Da Kasz at — administered by Universal Music Publishing (BMI), Stellar Songs Ltd., Sony/ATV (SESAC), Warner-Tamerlane Publishing Corp. (BMI) and Back in Djibouti (BMI)
- All rights on behalf of itself and Back in Djbouti (BMI), administered by Warner-Tamerlane Publishing Corp. (BMI)

Personnel

- Selena Gomez – lead vocals
- Stargate – songwriting, production for 45th & 3rd Music LLC, instrumentation, programming
- Benny Blanco – production, songwriting
- Charli XCX – songwriting, background vocals
- Ross Golan – songwriting
- Tim Blacksmith – executive production for Tim & Danny Music LLC
- Danny D – executive production for Tim & Danny LLC
- Andrew Luftman – production coordination
- Zvi Edelman – production coordination
- Astrid Taylor – production coordination
- Seif Hussain – production coordination
- Chris Sclafani – recording, vocal engineering
- Rob Ellmore – recording, vocal engineering
- Blake Mares – vocal engineering assistant
- Simon French – vocal engineering assistant
- Mark "Spike" Stent – mixing
- Matty Green – mixing assistant
- Geoff Swan – mixing assistant
- Chris Gehringer – mastering

== Charts ==
=== Weekly charts ===
Chart (2015–16)	Peak position
Australia (ARIA)	33
Austria (Ö3 Austria Top 40)	66
Belgium (Ultratip Bubbling Under Flanders)	5
Belgium (Ultratip Bubbling Under Wallonia)	4
Canada Hot 100 (Billboard)	6
Canada AC (Billboard)	28
Canada CHR/Top 40 (Billboard)	1
Canada Hot AC (Billboard)	10
Czech Republic Airplay (ČNS IFPI)	12
Czech Republic Singles Digital (ČNS IFPI)	6
Denmark (Tracklisten)	23
Finland Download (Latauslista)	28
France (SNEP)	26
France Airplay (SNEP)	19
Germany (GfK)	56
Hungary (Single Top 40)	33
Hungary (Stream Top 40)	14
Ireland (IRMA)	72
Italy (FIMI)	49
Mexico (Billboard Mexican Airplay)	23
Mexico Anglo (Monitor Latino)	11
Mexico Ingles Airplay (Billboard)	9
Netherlands (Single Top 100)	42
New Zealand Heatseekers (Recorded Music NZ)	2
Norway (VG-lista)	37
Poland Airplay (ZPAV)	28
Scottish Singles Sales (Official Charts)	66
Slovakia Airplay (ČNS IFPI)	32
Slovakia Singles Digital (ČNS IFPI)	10
Spain (Promusicae)	76
Sweden (Sverigetopplistan)	37
Switzerland (Schweizer Hitparade)	47
UK Singles (Official Charts)	81
US Billboard Hot 100	5
US Adult Contemporary (Billboard)	17
US Adult Pop Airplay (Billboard)	7
US Dance Airplay (Billboard)	4
US Latin Airplay (Billboard)	48
US Pop Airplay (Billboard)	1
US Rhythmic Airplay (Billboard)	6
Venezuela (Record Report)	91

=== Year-end charts ===
Chart (2016)	Position
Canada (Canadian Hot 100)	44
France (SNEP)	145
US Billboard Hot 100	40
US Adult Contemporary (Billboard)	47
US Adult Top 40 (Billboard)	29
US Dance/Mix Show Airplay (Billboard)	42
US Mainstream Top 40 (Billboard)	20
US Rhythmic (Billboard)	45

== Certifications ==
Region	Certification	Certified units/sales
Australia (ARIA)	2× Platinum	140,000^{‡}
Austria (IFPI Austria)	Gold	15,000^{‡}
Brazil (Pro-Música Brasil)	Diamond	250,000^{‡}
Canada (Music Canada)	2× Platinum	160,000^{*}
Denmark (IFPI Danmark)	Platinum	60,000^{^}
Germany (BVMI)	Gold	200,000^{‡}
Italy (FIMI)	Platinum	50,000^{‡}
New Zealand (RMNZ)	Platinum	30,000^{‡}
Norway (IFPI Norway)	2× Platinum	120,000^{‡}
Poland (ZPAV)	2× Platinum	40,000^{‡}
Portugal (AFP)	Gold	10,000^{‡}
Spain (Promusicae)	Gold	30,000^{‡}
Sweden (GLF)	Platinum	40,000^{‡}
United Kingdom (BPI)	Gold	400,000^{‡}
United States (RIAA)	3× Platinum	3,000,000^{‡}
^{*} Sales figures based on certification alone.^{^} Shipments figures based on certification alone.^{‡} Sales+streaming figures based on certification alone.

== Release history ==
Country	Date	Format	Label	Ref.
United Kingdom	September 10, 2015	Digital download	Polydor	
United States	September 10, 2015	Digital download	Interscope	
United States	October 6, 2015	Contemporary hit radio	Interscope	
United States	October 20, 2015	Rhythmic contemporary	Interscope	
United Kingdom	November 20, 2015	Digital download (Remixes)	Polydor	
United States	November 20, 2015	Digital download (Remixes)	Interscope	
Italy	November 20, 2015	Contemporary hit radio	Universal	
United States	January 5, 2016	Digital download (Grey Remix)	Interscope	
United Kingdom	January 5, 2016	Digital download (Grey Remix)	Polydor	
United States	January 6, 2016	Rhythmic contemporary (Fetty Wap Remix)	Interscope	
United States	January 8, 2016	Digital download (Fetty Wap Remix)	Interscope	

== See also ==
- List of Billboard Hot 100 top 10 singles in 2016
