= Me & the Rhythm =

2015 promotional single by Selena Gomez

Promotional single by Selena Gomez

from the album Revival
- Released: October 2, 2015
- Recorded: August 2015
- Studio: Wolf Cousins Studios and Maratone Studios (Stockholm, Sweden); Interscope Studios (Santa Monica, California)
- Genre: Dance; disco; synth-pop
- Length: 3:33
- Label: Interscope; Polydor
- Songwriter(s): Justin Tranter; Julia Michaels; Robin Fredriksson; Mattias Larsson; Selena Gomez
- Producer(s): Mattman & Robin

"Me & the Rhythm" is a song by American singer Selena Gomez from her second solo studio album Revival (2015), included as the eighth track on the record. It was released on October 2, 2015 to digital download platforms as the album's first and only promotional single. The song was written by Gomez, Justin Tranter, and Julia Michaels, along with its producers Robin Fredriksson and Mattias Larsson, known as Mattman & Robin. "Me & the Rhythm" was the last song recorded for Revival, conceived after Gomez delayed the album's mixing to record more material with Michaels and Tranter. Gomez has called the track a personal favorite from the album.

"Me & the Rhythm" is a dance, disco, and synth-pop song, while its production contains steel drums, deep house beats, "pulsating" percussion and "smoky" synths throughout its instrumentation. Lyrically, the track addresses the concepts of losing yourself on the dance floor and being free in the moment. "Me & the Rhythm" was well received by contemporary music critics, with praise directed at its vintage disco sound and Gomez's sultry vocals. The promote the song, the singer appeared on The Today Show to perform a set which included a medley of "Me & the Rhythm" and "Come & Get It". The track was included on the setlist for the singer's 2016 Revival Tour.

== Recording and release ==
Following the unexpected success of "Good for You" on 2015 music charts worldwide, Gomez met with Interscope representatives to request that the album's mixing be delayed in order to record additional music with "Good for You" songwriters Julia Michaels and Justin Tranter. After their previous collaboration, Gomez became "super obsessed" with Michaels and Tranter, and felt that they created "magic" in the studio, with the singer going on to say she "felt like Julia was me and I was Julia." Her label authorized the delay and the team worked for four days, ultimately creating three songs, two of which appeared on the record: "Hands to Myself" and "Me & the Rhythm". "Me & the Rhythm" was written by Gomez, Tranter, Michaels and production team Mattman & Robin (Mattias Larsson and Robin Fredriksson). The latter also produced the track, as well as being responsible for programming, drums, percussion, synths, bass and vocal production. Michaels provided background vocals. Serban Ghenea was in charge of the mixing, while John Hanes was the mixing engineer. It was recorded and mixed at Wolf Cousins Studios, Maratone Studios in Stockholm, Sweden and Interscope Studios in Santa Monica, California.

As the last song created for Revival, Gomez has called "Me & the Rhythm" a personal favorite from the record. When asked about collaborating with Gomez, Michaels commented: "I think Selena is a lot like Justin [Tranter] and I, in the way that…when you find something that you feel connected to, and it's real and it's honest, you don't let it go. You see where it can lead you." A snippet of the track was first teased along with the official artwork on September 26, 2015. Later, the song was fully released as the album's first and only promotional single, a week before album release on October 9, followed by the album's two singles, "Good for You" and "Same Old Love" (2015).

== Composition ==
"Me & the Rhythm" was described as a dance, disco, and synth-pop song, with an instrumentation consisting of deep house beats, steel drums, smoky synths and pulsating percussion. Its opening "pulsing beats" were compared to "1970s Donna Summer disco jams" by Samantha Schnurr of E! Online, while Zach Dionne of Fuse likened the song to Carly Rae Jepsen's album Emotion; Digital Spy's Lewis Corner felt the track had a "seductive '80s groove." Mike Wass of Idolator noted that the song is "the most obvious link between the 'Stars Dance' and 'Revival' eras," comparing it to Kylie Minogue circa Fever (especially "Come into My World"), and Body Talk-era Robyn.

Lyrically, "Me & the Rhythm" is about losing one's inhibitions while dancing. According to Gomez, "[I]t's not about love. It's just about feeling that moment and being present. Everyone's on their phones, everyone's doing this, and it's just about you and what you're experiencing in that moment." During the bridge, Gomez gives a "Janet Jackson-esque" rap verse.

== Critical reception ==
"Me & the Rhythm" received acclaim from contemporary music critics. Andrea Navarro of Teen Vogue praised the song and called it a "sultry" jam. Tim Sendra of AllMusic picked the track as one of the album's highlights, noting that Gomez "sounds most at home" on the track, "where the smoothness of her voice fits in with the vacant abandon of the beat." Brittany Spanos of Rolling Stone applauded the song for "find[ing] her sounding completely in control of her own euphoria", while appreciating "[h]er brand of sexiness" for having "a coy, subtle quality that never tries too hard." Mike Wass of Idolator called it "breathy" synthpop, but noted that there is "simplicity and sophistication" to the track's production that sets it apart. Wass also praised the fact that "her casual disinterest is perfectly suited to the icy, quintessentially Scandinavian arrangement."

In another review, he also highlighted that the song is "a pop anthem with an unexpected twist" and that it has "an air of sophistication to the arrangement and vocal delivery that sets it apart." Samantha Schnurr of E! Online remarked that Gomez "has definitely found her rhythm" on the track, calling it "[e]qually as catchy as her first single," also observing that "Gomez's signature airy vocals are on full blast backed by an upbeat tempo perfect for strutting out on the dance floor in a pair of platform heels." Lewis Corner of Digital Spy praised the song, noting that it had a seductive "'80s groove". Writing for Fuse, Zach Dionne was very positive, defining the track as "[e]qual parts romantic and club-ready," while declaring that it "might be our favorite 'Revival' tune to date."

== Commercial performance ==
After being released as a promotional single, "Me & the Rhythm" entered the Canadian Hot 100 at number 57. Around the same time, it failed to reach the Billboard Hot 100, however, it peaked inside of the Bubbling Under Hot 100, which acts as an extension of the former chart, reaching number six. On October 10, 2015, it entered at number 165 on the French Singles Chart, peaking on its second and final week at number 143. On the Czech and Slovak Singles Digitál Top 100 chart the song peaked at numbers 83 and 68, respectively.

== Credits and personnel ==
Credits adapted from the liner notes of Revival.

Recording

- Recorded at Wolf Cousins Studios and Maratone Studios (Stockholm, Sweden) and Interscope Studios (Santa Monica, California)
- Mixed at MixStar Studios (Virginia Beach, Virginia)
- Mastered at Sound Sterling (New York City, New York)

Management

- Published by Justin's School for Girls (BMI) and Warner-Tamerlane Publishing Corp. (BMI)
- All rights administered by Warner-Tamerlane Publishing Corp. (BMI) and Thanks for the Songs Richard (BMI)
- All rights on behalf of itself and Thanks for the Songs Richard (BMI) — administered by Warner-Tamerlane Publishing Corp. —, Ma-Jay Publishing/Wolf Cousins/Warner Chappell Music Scandinavia (STIM) and MXM — administered by Kobalt (ASCAP)

Personnel

- Selena Gomez – songwriting, lead vocals
- Mattman & Robin – songwriting, production, vocal production, recording, tracking, programming, drums, percussion, synths, bass
- Julia Michaels – songwriting, background vocals
- Justin Tranter – songwriting
- Juan Carlos Torrado – recording assistant
- Serban Ghenea – mixing
- John Hanes – mixing engineering
- Chris Gehringer – mastering

== Charts ==
Chart (2015)	Peak position
Canada (Canadian Hot 100)	57
Czech Republic (Singles Digitál Top 100)	83
France (SNEP)	143
Slovakia (Singles Digitál Top 100)	68
US Bubbling Under Hot 100 Singles (Billboard)	6
