= Kill Em with Kindness =

2016 single by Selena Gomez

Single by Selena Gomez

from the album Revival
- Released: May 3, 2016
- Recorded: April 2015
- Studio: Rock Mafia Studios (Los Angeles, California)
- Genre: Dance-pop; EDM; tropical house
- Length: 3:37
- Label: Interscope
- Songwriters: Antonina Armato; Tim James; Benjamin Levin; Dave Audé; Selena Gomez
- Producers: Rock Mafia; Benny Blanco

Selena Gomez singles chronology
"Hands to Myself" (2016)	"Kill Em with Kindness" (2016)	"We Don't Talk Anymore" (2016)

Music video
- "Kill Em with Kindness" on YouTube

"Kill Em with Kindness" is a song recorded by American singer Selena Gomez. It was serviced to contemporary hit radio on May 3, 2016, through Interscope Records as the fourth and final single from her second studio album Revival (2015). The song was written by Gomez and producers Rock Mafia, Benny Blanco and Dave Audé, while R3drum contributed additional production. "Kill Em with Kindness" is a tropical house song with an electronic production.

Lyrically, the track gives advice for dealing with critics and revolves around the theme of magnanimity. It was inspired by the body-shaming Gomez endured from media outlets and social media when pictures of her on a beach in Mexico surfaced online. "Kill Em with Kindness" garnered generally positive reviews from music critics, who highlighted its positive themes, sleek production, and hook, though some felt it lacked originality. It performed moderately well on international music charts; reaching number one in Poland, top ten in Belgium, the Czech Republic, and Hungary, and top twenty in Argentina, Canada, Finland, Latvia, Lebanon, Slovakia, and Switzerland. In the United States, it peaked at number 39 on the Billboard Hot 100, being the only single off Revival not to enter the top ten.

The accompanying music video was directed by Emil Nava and released on June 6, 2016. The black and white clip follows Gomez around a sprawling mansion during multiple photo shoots, dressed only in a corset and underwear, while shots of choreographed interpretive dancers, falling bullets, and blood-dripped flowers are interspersed throughout. The video was well received by critics, who praised its "artful" direction and intimate feel. To promote "Kill Em with Kindness", Gomez performed the song live for several venues including the Jingle Ball Tour 2015, and was included as part of her Revival Tour set list.

== Background ==
"It's kind of my motto for life. It's so much easier to be mean. It's so easy to just kind of give yourself that, but it's so hard to walk away from a situation, turn your cheek the other way, and be the bigger person. So, that's what 'Kill Em with Kindness' represents. I think people need to hear that more often."

— Gomez on the theme of magnanimity

According to Gomez, one of the main inspirations behind the song was the body-shaming she dealt with from tabloids and social media users when paparazzi photographs emerged of her in a bikini during a trip to Mexico in April 2015. Many claimed she had gained weight, with some media outlets going as far as to label her a "mess", and suggesting she was "going off the deep end". Gomez recalled, "I was getting a lot of hate for my body and 'you're gaining weight,' and so I was in Mexico and I was just feeling all of this stuff and I would be lying to you if I said it didn't kind of hurt my feelings, but I kind of channeled that into my music." She called the experience "degrading", adding that she had never been through such intense bullying before.

In an interview for Power 106, Gomez spoke in-depth about the inspiration behind "Kill Em with Kindness", saying: "Everybody has had a say in my life […] meaning the world, the perception, the media. It was really frustrating. There is a song on my record called 'Kill Em with Kindness.' So I've always done that. I ignore, I ignore, I ignore. And then it just kind of got out of hand. So I went to the new label [Interscope] and I was like, I have to say something. I need to say what I want to say, and you guys have to help me figure out how to do that." While working on the album, Gomez enlisted frequent collaborators Rock Mafia to help make her sound a reality. They helped Gomez on the creation of six tracks on the album, including "Revival" and "Kill Em with Kindness", the latter being one of the most personal tracks on Revival. She told the producers that although the production was important, she wanted the lyrics to be the focus of the song.

== Recording and release ==
"Kill Em with Kindness" was written by Selena Gomez, Antonina Armato, Tim James, Benjamin Levin and David Aude. The track was recorded by Steve Hammons and Adam Comstock at Rock Mafia Studios in Los Angeles, California. After adding the instrumentation and programming from Dave Audé, James and Blanco produced "Kill Em with Kindness" with assistance from R3drum. The song was sent to be mixed by Serban Ghenea at Mixstar Studios in Virginia Beach, Virginia. John Hanes served as the track's mixing engineer, and received assistance from Phil Seaford.

After releasing three successful singles from Revival, Gomez announced that she had begun recording a follow-up to the album, stating that she was ready to move on from the era. However, in an interview for 97.5 Now FM, Gomez revealed that "Kill Em with Kindness" was going to be released as the album's fourth and final single, saying: "‘Kill Em with Kindness’ is lyrically my favorite song I put on the record and I definitely can't wait to be able for that to have a story." It was serviced to contemporary hit radio on May 3, 2016. On May 31, 2016, the official cover art for the single was released. It features a lipstick print against a black surface, which Mike Wass of Idolator noted "vaguely ties in with the song’s message of rising above your haters."

== Composition ==
"Kill Em with Kindness"
A 21-second sample of "Kill Em with Kindness". A dance-pop and EDM song, critics noted its electronic production.

Musically, "Kill Em with Kindness" is a groove-driven dance-pop song. Its electronic production is composed of airy synths, added bells, and a whistled hook, connected by a tropical breeze. Cristina Jaleru of The Washington Times called "Kill Em with Kindness" an "approachable dance track", while Mike Wass of Idolator noted that the whistle hook recalled Adam Lambert's "Ghost Town". According to the sheet music published at Musicnotes.com by Universal Music Publishing Group, the song is written in the key of B-flat minor with a tempo of 120 beats per minute in common time. The track follows a chord progression of B♭m – G♭ – D♭ – F7, and Gomez's vocals span from A♭_{3} to B♭_{4}.

"I’ve been frustrated and pissed off before, but my mom has always taught me, every single time, turn my cheek the other way. It is always the best feeling waking up the next day going, 'They gave me their worst, I gave them my best, and that's all I can do.'"

— Gomez on the message behind the song

Lyrically, "Kill Em with Kindness" gives advice for dealing with critics, and delivers a message of choosing peace instead of violence and revenge. As the song opens, Gomez professes: "The world can be a nasty place / You know it / I know it". Wass noted the lyrics as conveying a message of peace, saying "instead of raising the proverbial middle finger, [Gomez] takes the high road." The theme of magnanimity is further displayed in lyrics such as "We don't have to fall from grace / Put down the weapons you fight with", imploring the listener to "put out the fire before igniting." According to Mikael Wood of the Los Angeles Times, the song was Gomez's response to "ungentle tabloid chatter" in regards to her health.

== Critical reception ==
Tim Sendra of AllMusic picked it as a highlight from the album, remarking that "Gomez sounds most at home." Elysa Gardner of USA Today selected it one of the tracks to download and named it a "groove-driven, electro-savvy track." Sal Cinquemani of Slant Magazine noted that though it "lacks of originality," the song is yet a standout. James Reed of The Boston Globe called it a "dance-floor catnip," while Dave Hanratty of Drowned in Sound named it a "laser-focused sugar rush", adding that "Gomez succeeds in laying down a winning pop gauntlet." Mikael Wood of Los Angeles Times noted that "what's remarkable is how steadied she seems by such a facile conviction." Katharine St. Asaph of Time labelled it "au corant", which according to him "stirs a tropical-house breeze not dissimilar from Bieber's song 'What Do You Mean?'." Jia Tolentino of Spin wrote that the track works for addressing the viewing public, calling it a "hustling little posi-heater." Mike Wass of Idolator referred to it as a "triple threat's measured missive to haters," noting that the message "is a powerful stance in the age of online-bullying, Twitter beefs and messy open letters."

== Chart performance ==
In the United States, "Kill Em with Kindness" entered at number 37 on the Mainstream Top 40 chart dated May 10, 2016, Four weeks after, the song debuted at number 74 on Billboard Hot 100 prompted by a 25% sales increase with 2.8 million streams in the United States. Following the release of its accompanying music video on June 6, 2016, the song bounded from number 74 to number 52 on the Hot 100 chart, with 15,000 downloads sold. In its new position, the song also debuted at number 48 on Radio Songs with radio audience of 26 million and received 5.1 million streams in the United States winning Streaming Gainer. In the same week, "Kill Em with Kindness" climbed from 18 to 17 on Mainstream Top 40, becoming the fourth single to reached the top 20 from Revival'. For the week ending July 9, 2016, the song rose from number 44 to number 39 on the Hot 100, giving to Gomez her fourth top 40 song from Revival. The same week, it debuted at number 40 on Streaming Songs (with 6.4 million streams domestically – up 15 percent) and number 48 on Digital Songs (with 20,000 downloads sold).

"Kill Em with Kindness" debuted at number 43 on Australia's ARIA Charts on the week ending June 12, 2016; it went on to reach number 33 on July 10, 2016. The song spent 13 weeks on the chart, with it being certified Platinum by the Australian Recording Industry Association (ARIA) for exceeding the 70,000 sales mark.

== Music video ==
Set in a black-and-white vision, the video contains several shots of Gomez's in different positions while she appears on a stool in front of a grey backdrop (pictured).

The music video was released on Vevo on June 6, 2016. It was directed by Emil Nava and shot in black-and-white. The video begins with Gomez in a photoshoot set with makeup artists around her, a black screen containing the song's title introduces the video. Gomez then appears sit in a stool wearing a "slinky, satin slip with a drape-y robe falling off of her shoulders as she smolders on a stool in front of a gray backdrop." The scenes are interspersed with shots of herself in different positions.

During the song's chorus, Gomez appears in front of a mirror while stare at her own reflection and the main view. The following scenes "dramatic shots of bullets and blood-dripped flowers flash across the frame." As noted by Ryan Reed from Rolling Stone. Later, Gomez is shown surrounded by flashes of cameras in a garden as background. The video also features several dancers performing interpretive moves, and later "Gomez begins to shed layers of her clothing, at one point wearing just a corset and underwear." Billboard staff called it "artful", while Ryan Reed of Rolling Stone named it "dramatic". Gabriella Salkin of V went on to call it "intimate and sultry." While some critics praised its simplicity and meaning in contrast with the song's theme.

== Live performances and usage in media ==
Gomez performed the song as part of her setlist at Jingle Ball Tour 2015. "Kill Em with Kindness" is included on the encore of her Revival Tour.

In July 2016, Gomez appeared in an advertisement for American telecommunications company Verizon, entitled "Play It Again". The advertisement features Gomez dancing around a fan, who is using his data to stream "Kill Em with Kindness". She follows him around throughout the day, including inside a locker room, walking down the street, in a laundromat and in a diner. Every time the song ends, Gomez tells him to "play it again". An acoustic version of "Kill Em with Kindness" appears on the soundtrack to Gomez's Netflix series 13 Reasons Why (2017).

== Formats and track listings ==
- Digital download
1. Kill Em with Kindness - 3:37
- Digital download (Remixes)
1. Kill Em with Kindness (Felix Cartal Remix) - 3:17
2. Kill Em with Kindness (Young Bombs Remix) - 3:56
3. Kill Em with Kindness (River Tiber Remix) - 3:41
- Digital download (Acoustic version)
1. Kill Em with Kindness (Acoustic Version) - 3:32

== Credits and personnel ==
Credits and personnel adapted from Revival album liner notes.

Recording and management

- Recorded at Rock Mafia Studios (Los Angeles, California)
- Mixed at Mixstar Studios (Virginia Beach, Virginia)
- Mastered at Sterling Sound (New York City, New York
- Published by Antonina Songs (ASCAP) — administered by Downtown Music Publishing LLC —, Akashic Field Music (BMI), Superstar Maker Music (BMI), Please Don't Forget to Play Me Music — administered by Universal Music Publishing (GMR) and Good Fellowship Publishing (ASCAP)

Personnel

- Selena Gomez – lead vocals, songwriting
- Rock Mafia – songwriting, production, instrumentation, programming
- Benny Blanco – songwriting, production, instrumentation, programming
- R3drum – additional production
- Dave Audé – songwriting
- Andrew Luftman – production coordination
- Zvi Edelman – production coordination
- Astrid Taylor – production coordination
- Seif Hussain – production coordination
- Steve Hammons – recording
- Adam Comstock – recording
- Serban Ghenea – mixing
- John Hanes – mixing engineering
- Phil Seaford – mixing engineering
- Chris Gehringer – mastering

== Charts ==
=== Weekly charts ===
Chart (2016)	Peak position
Australia (ARIA)	33
Austria (Ö3 Austria Top 40)	32
Belgium (Ultratip Bubbling Under Flanders)	20
Belgium (Ultratip Bubbling Under Wallonia)	2
Canada Hot 100 (Billboard)	14
CIS Airplay (TopHit)	160
Czech Republic Airplay (ČNS IFPI)	6
Denmark (Tracklisten)	30
Finland (Suomen virallinen lista)	17
France (SNEP)	109
Germany (GfK)	39
Hungary (Rádiós Top 40)	7
Hungary (Single Top 40)	10
Ireland (IRMA)	24
Italy (FIMI)	37
Latvia (Latvijas Top 40)	19
Lebanon (Lebanese Top 20)	13
Netherlands (Single Top 100)	36
New Zealand (Recorded Music NZ)	28
Norway (VG-lista)	33
Poland Airplay (ZPAV)	1
Poland (Video Chart)	3
Portugal (AFP)	27
Slovakia Airplay (ČNS IFPI)	17
Slovakia Singles Digital (ČNS IFPI)	16
Scottish Singles Sales (Official Charts)	23
Spain (Promusicae)	65
Sweden (Sverigetopplistan)	34
Switzerland (Schweizer Hitparade)	18
UK Singles (Official Charts)	35
Ukraine Airplay (TopHit)	10
US Billboard Hot 100	39
US Pop Airplay (Billboard)	15

=== Year-end charts ===
Chart (2016)	Position
Canada (Canadian Hot 100)	68
Hungary (Rádiós Top 40)	43
Hungary (Single Top 40)	70
Poland (ZPAV)	26
Switzerland (Schweizer Hitparade)	83
Ukraine Airplay (Tophit)	110
Chart (2017)	Position
Hungary (Rádiós Top 40)	32
Ukraine Airplay (Tophit)	174
Chart (2018)	Position
Hungary (Rádiós Top 40)	51

== Certifications ==
Region	Certification	Certified units/sales
Australia (ARIA)	2× Platinum	140,000^{‡}
Austria (IFPI Austria)	Gold	15,000^{‡}
Brazil (Pro-Música Brasil)	Diamond	250,000^{‡}
Denmark (IFPI Danmark)	Gold	45,000^{‡}
Germany (BVMI)	Gold	200,000^{‡}
Italy (FIMI)	2× Platinum	100,000^{‡}
New Zealand (RMNZ)	Platinum	30,000^{‡}
Norway (IFPI Norway)	Platinum	60,000^{‡}
Poland (ZPAV)	Platinum	50,000^{‡}
Portugal (AFP)	Gold	5,000^{‡}
Spain (Promusicae)	Gold	30,000^{‡}
Sweden (GLF)	Platinum	40,000^{‡}
United Kingdom (BPI)	Gold	400,000^{‡}
United States (RIAA)	Platinum	1,000,000^{‡}
^{‡} Sales+streaming figures based on certification alone.
