= Foxes discography =

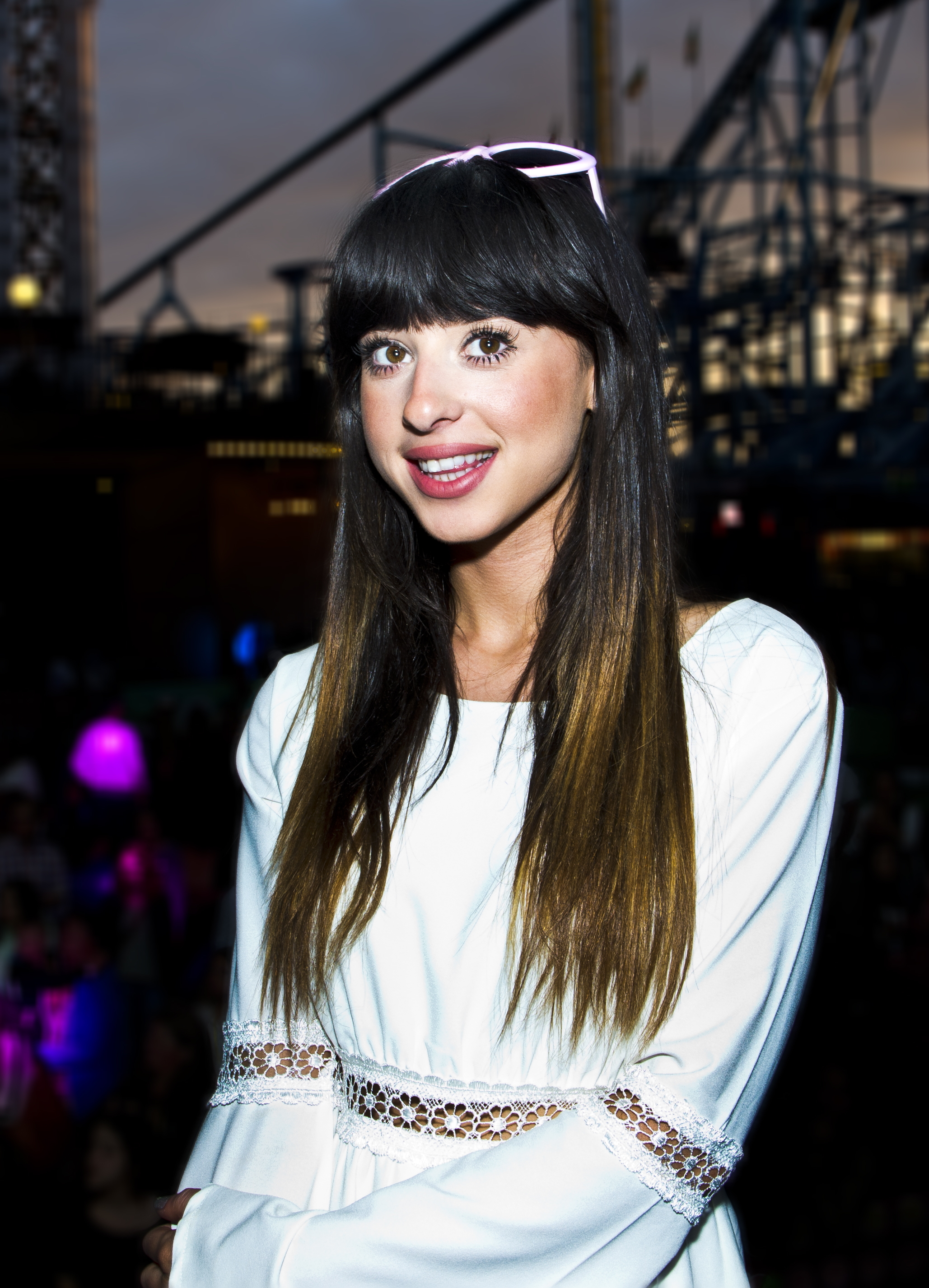
- Foxes in 2014 at Sommarkrysset
- Studio albums: 3
- Singles: 21
- Extended plays: 2
- Promotional singles: 9
- Music videos: 18

The discography of English singer and songwriter Foxes consists of three studio albums, two extended plays, twenty one singles (including two as a featured artist), nine promotional singles and eighteen music videos. She is best known for her featured vocals on Zedd's song "Clarity", which peaked at number eight on the Billboard Hot 100 and Rudimental's song "Right Here", which peaked at number 14 on the UK Singles Chart, as well as a number of her own hit songs as the lead artist like "Youth" and "Let Go for Tonight".

On 18 May 2012 she released her debut EP, Warrior, working with Sam Dixon. In September 2013 she released her debut single "Youth" as the lead single from her debut studio album. The song has peaked at number 12 on the UK Singles Chart and number 21 on the Irish Singles Chart. On 31 October 2013 she revealed the name of her debut album to be called Glorious which was released on 12 May 2014 and peak at number 5 on the UK charts and has been certified silver in the UK. On 4 November 2013 she unveiled the album cover along with the track list through Instagram, including 11 tracks on the standard version and 16 on the deluxe version. She also worked with Fall Out Boy on a track called "Just One Yesterday" released alongside their album Save Rock and Roll in the same year. In February 2014 she released "Let Go for Tonight" as the second single from the album, which became her highest-peaking single to date, reaching number 7 on the UK charts and has been certified silver there. "Holding onto Heaven" was released as the third single in May, and became Foxes' fourth top 20 single.

On 5 February 2016 she released her second studio album titled All I Need and was promoted by 4 singles including the lead single "Body Talk" which was released in July 2015 and peaked at number 25 on the UK charts. Furthermore, in 2016, she was featured on a track called "Oasis" with Kygo from his debut album Cloud Nine. After a four-year hiatus, "Love Not Loving You" was released on 20 May 2020 as the lead single from her second EP, Friends in the Corner which was released on 1 April 2021. The EP was also preceded by four other singles; "Woman" on 29 July 2020, "Friends in the Corner" on 2 September 2020, "Hollywood" on 4 December 2020 and "Kathleen" on 17 March 2021 as the second to fifth singles respectively.

== Studio albums ==
Title	Details	Peak chart positions								Certifications
Title	Details	UK	AUS	CAN	IRE	JPN	NZ	SCO	US Heat	Certifications
Glorious	Released: 12 May 2014; Labels: RCA, Sign of the Times; Formats: LP, CD, digital download	5	36	64	11	69	29	5	27	BPI: Silver
All I Need	Released: 5 February 2016; Labels: RCA, Sign of the Times; Formats: LP, CD, digital download	12	53	—	48	111	—	15	8	
The Kick	Released: 11 February 2022; Labels: PIAS; Formats: LP, CD, digital download	—	—	—	—	—	—	71	—	
"—" denotes releases that did not chart or were not released in that country.

== Extended plays ==
Title	Details
Warrior	Released: 18 May 2012; Label: RCA, Sign of the Times, Neon Gold; Formats: Digital download
Friends in the Corner	Released: 1 April 2021; Label: PIAS; Formats: Digital download, streaming, LP

== Singles ==
=== As lead artist ===
Title	Year	Peak chart positions								Certifications	Album
Title	Year	UK	AUS	BEL (FL)	HUN	IRE	SCO	JPN	US Dance	Certifications	Album
"Youth"	2013	12	—	— (Note: "Youth" did not enter the Ultratop 50, but peaked at number 26 on the Flemish Ultratip chart.)	—	21	7	—	1	BPI: Silver	Glorious
"Let Go for Tonight"	2014	7	59	— (Note: "Let Go for Tonight" did not enter the Ultratop 50, but peaked at number 25 on the Flemish Ultratip chart.)	—	6	7	12	—	BPI: Silver	Glorious
"Holding onto Heaven"	2014	14	—	—	28	46	9	—	10		Glorious
"Glorious"	2014	97	—	—	—	—	68	—	—		Glorious
"Body Talk"	2015	25	—	— (Note: "Body Talk" did not enter the Ultratop 50, but peaked at number 67 on the Flemish Ultratip chart.)	—	100	9	—	—	BPI: Silver	All I Need
"Better Love"	2015	133	—	—	—	—	55	—	—		All I Need
"Amazing"	2015	169	—	—	—	—	69	—	—		All I Need
"Love Not Loving You"	2020	—	—	—	—	—	—	—	—		Friends in the Corner
"Woman"	2020	—	—	—	—	—	—	—	—		Friends in the Corner
"Friends in the Corner"	2020	—	—	—	—	—	—	—	—		Friends in the Corner
"Hollywood"	2020	—	—	—	—	—	—	—	—		Friends in the Corner
"Kathleen"	2021	—	—	—	—	—	—	—	—		Friends in the Corner
"Sister Ray"	2021	—	—	—	—	—	—	—	—		The Kick
"Dance Magic"	2021	—	—	—	—	—	—	—	—		The Kick
"Sky Love"	2021	—	—	—	—	—	—	—	—		The Kick
"Absolute"	2022	—	—	—	—	—	—	—	—		The Kick
"Body Suit"	2022	—	—	—	—	—	—	—	—		The Kick
"Growing on Me"	2022	—	—	—	—	—	—	—	—		The Kick
"—" denotes releases that did not chart or were not released in that country.

=== As featured artist ===
Title	Year	Peak chart positions										Certifications	Album
Title	Year	UK	AUS	BEL (FL)	CAN	GER	IRE	NL	NZ	SCO	US	Certifications	Album
"Clarity" (Zedd featuring Foxes)	2012	27	13	38	17	94	39	81	13	22	8	BPI: Platinum; ARIA: 6× Platinum; MC: Platinum; RIAA: 3× Platinum; RMNZ: 3× Platinum	Clarity
"Right Here" (Rudimental featuring Foxes)	2013	14	29	— (Note: "Right Here" did not enter the Ultratop 50, but peaked at number 9 on the Flemish Ultratip chart.)	—	—	—	—	—	19	—	BPI: Silver; RMNZ: Gold	Home
"—" denotes releases that did not chart or were not released in that country.

=== Promotional singles ===
Title	Year	Peak chart positions		Album
Title	Year	UK	SCO	Album
"White Coats"	2012	—	—	Glorious
"Echo"	2012	—	—	Glorious
"Home"	2012	—	—	Glorious
"Beauty Queen"	2013	—	—	Glorious
"Shaking Heads"	2014	—	—	Glorious
"Feet Don't Fail Me Now"	2015	187	63	All I Need
"If You Leave Me Now"	2015	—	—	All I Need
"Devil Side"	2015	174	69	All I Need
"Wicked Love"	2016	—	90	All I Need
"—" denotes releases that did not chart or were not released in that country.

== Guest appearances ==
Title	Year	Other artist(s)	Album
"Just One Yesterday"	2013	Fall Out Boy	Save Rock and Roll
"Until the End"	2013	Sub Focus	Torus
"Wildstar"	2015	Giorgio Moroder	Déjà Vu
"Oasis"	2016	Kygo	Cloud Nine

== Music videos ==
List of music videos, showing year released and directors
Title	Year	Director(s)	Ref.
As lead artist
"Home"	2011	Flora Hanitijo	
"White Coats"	2012	Flora Hanitijo	
"Echo"	2012	Adam Levins	
"Youth"	2013	James Copeman	
"Let Go for Tonight"	2014	Marc Klasfeld	
"Holding onto Heaven"	2014	Henry Scholfield	
"Glorious"	2014	Justin Anderson	
"Body Talk"	2015	Virgili Jubero	
"Feet Don't Fail Me Now"	2015	Patrick Killingbeck	
"Better Love"	2015	Kinga Burza	
"If You Leave Me Now"	2015	Unknown	
"Amazing"	2015	Johny Mourgue	
"Cruel"	2016	Olof Lindh	
"Love Not Loving You"	2020	Rauri Cantelo	
"Woman"	2020	Gemma Green-Hope	
"Friends in the Corner"	2020	Joshua Trigg	
"Kathleen"	2021	Florence Kosky	
"Sister Ray"	2021	Florence Kosky	
"Growing on Me"	2022	Florence Kosky	
As featured artist
"Clarity" (Zedd featuring Foxes)	2013	Jodeb	
"Just One Yesterday" (Fall Out Boy featuring Foxes)	2013	Donald / Zaeh	
