= Clarity (Zedd album) =

Studio album by Zedd
- Released: 2 October 2012
- Recorded: 2011–2012
- Genres: EDM; electro house; progressive house; dance-pop
- Length: 44:27
- Label: Interscope
- Producers: Zedd; Lucky Date

Zedd chronology
Clarity (2012)	True Colors (2015)

Singles from Clarity
- 1. "Shave It" Released: 4 October 2011; 2. "Spectrum" Released: 4 June 2012; 3. "Clarity" Released: 14 November 2012

Singles from Clarity (Deluxe version)
- 1. "Stay the Night" Released: 23 September 2013; 2. "Push Play" Released: 23 November 2013

Clarity is the debut studio album by Russian-German electronic music producer Zedd, released on 2 October 2012 by Interscope Records. A deluxe edition of the album was released on 24 September 2013, preceded by the release of the single "Stay the Night", which features Hayley Williams of Paramore, on 23 September 2013. Upon its release, the album garnered mixed reviews from critics.

Clarity spawned five officially released singles ("Shave It", "Spectrum" and "Clarity" for the original release, and "Stay the Night" and "Push Play" for the deluxe edition) and two promotional singles, "Stache" and "Fall into the Sky". "Shave It", the album's lead single, peaked at number four on the US Hot Dance Club Songs chart. It was followed by "Spectrum", which topped the Hot Dance Club Songs chart. "Clarity", the record's title track and third single, was issued in 2013, and reached into the top 10 of the Billboard Hot 100 at number eight and earned a Grammy for Best Dance Recording at the 56th Grammy Awards. "Stay the Night" was the lead single of the deluxe edition of the album, and also charted on the Hot 100, reaching the Top 20 with a peak of number eighteen. "Push Play" was the second single from the deluxe version, and the last single from the album overall.

== Singles ==
"Shave It" was released by Owsla as a single on 4 October 2011 and as an extended play ("The Aftershave"), including remixes by Kaskade, Tommy Trash and 501, on 8 November 2011. The track was shortened and renamed "Shave It Up" for inclusion on the album. The official music video premiered on 1 November 2011. An extended mix of "Shave It Up" (which is around the same length as "Shave It") was released exclusively on Beatport on 22 October 2012.

"Spectrum" (featuring Matthew Koma) was released as the second single from the album on 4 June 2012 by Interscope Records. The song reached number one on Billboard's Hot Dance Club Songs, and the official video premiered on 15 August 2012. The EP, released on 31 July 2012, contains 7 remixes from artists such as A-Trak, Armin van Buuren, Arty, Deniz Koyu and Congorock among others, alongside an acoustic version of the track, an extended version of the track and Zedd's collaboration with Nicky Romero, "Human". A remix contest was hosted on Beatport, receiving over 2000 entries. The winning remix was by Shreddie Mercury, who also received an official release.

"Clarity" (featuring Foxes) was released as the album's third single on 1 February 2013. The song gained publicity after being performed alongside Alvin Risk on the Late Show with David Letterman on 3 January 2013. A music video directed by Jodeb was released on 11 January 2013. At the 56th Grammy Awards, the song took home the Grammy for Best Dance Recording. The vocals and recording were produced and edited by Jonny "Ghostwriter" Harris in London. Jonny was working with Foxes (singer) on various productions at the time.

"Stay the Night" (featuring Hayley Williams of Paramore) was released as a single from the deluxe edition of the album and the fourth single overall on 23 September 2013. A preview of the song was uploaded to Zedd's official YouTube channel on 4 September 2013 and the music video on 23 September 2013.

=== Other songs ===
"Stache" is a promotional single from the album. The official music video premiered on 2 October 2012. The extended mix was the first to be released as a single exclusively on Beatport on 9 October 2012. The video itself revolves around a foreign scientist hiding in an abandoned building, who's trying to finish creating an antimatter bomb called the "Clandon Particle", while U.S. forces in the country are trying to stop him from finishing it. As soldiers surround the area, the scientist is forced to detonate the entire building, in which (presumably) he ultimately dies. Throughout the entire video, the events are being broadcast on live television; small clips throughout the video show the head of national security addressing the entire country about the events as they happen. Near the end of the video, several people are revealed to have been watching the live events on television, all seemingly proud. MTV Iggy wrote "['Stache''s] climbing synth chords matches the tension and confusion while plentiful bass packs a powerful punch. We hold our breaths down to the very last minute – and 'til the awesome end-of-song-breakdown." Vocals by Lady Gaga (whom Zedd opened for during the Asian leg of her Born This Way Ball tour and produced tracks on her album Artpop) were posted by her on SoundCloud on 6 October 2012. She then asked fans to pair the vocal track with "Stache" and selected a winner. The track concludes with "DJ Zedd/ Anton, turn it up/ Let's party, let's get messed up". Jocelyn Vena of MTV said the remix was a "crunchy, at times light-hearted track, which features Gaga over the EDM star's grinding, dirty production."

"Codec" is featured in the 2013 film Now You See Me and included on the accompanying soundtrack album. The song was also used in an advert for the Beats Pill.

"Fall into the Sky" was released as a free "Song of the Week" on the UK iTunes Store for the week ending 23 February 2014, to promote the UK release of the deluxe edition of Clarity.

=== Extended mixes ===
A different extended mix from the album was released exclusively to Beatport each week for eight weeks, starting on 9 October 2012 and ending on 26 November 2012. All tracks were given new extended versions with the exceptions of "Spectrum" (for which an extended mix had already been previously released) and "Hourglass".

== Critical reception ==
Professional ratings
Review scores
Source	Rating
AllMusic	4/5 stars
EDM Insider	A+
Gigwise	4/10 stars
Spin	5/10
Sputnikmusic	2/5 stars

Clarity was met with mixed reception from critics. Philip Sherburne of Spin rated the album a five out of ten, stating how the release contains "45 minutes of twists and turns and come-ups and codas get exhausting, and from a production perspective, there's little innovation here", which he has listen to "these sirens, whooshes, and fizzy synths a million times." At Sputnikmusic, Will Robinson rated the album two stars out of five, indicating how "The redeeming qualities of Clarity exist, but they're minor and not enough to keep the album's head above water." Andy Kellman of AllMusic rated the album four stars out of five, writing how "Anyone who appreciates well-crafted dance-pop should probably keep up with him." At Gigwise, Peter Kandunias rated the album four stars out of ten, saying how "all sounding incredibly similar, the songs blur into one and thus 'Clarity' really lacks any clarity whatsoever." Daniel Shaw of EDM Insider gave album an A+, indicating how the project "Not only does Zedd explore a wide magnitude of sounds and feels in his creative work, but he manages to create a cohesive album."

== Commercial performance ==
In the United States, Clarity debuted at number 38 on the Billboard 200 and at number two on the Dance/Electronic Albums chart, selling 12,000 copies in its first week. It had sold 208,000 copies in the US as of May 2015.

== Track listing ==
No.	Title	Writer(s)	Length
1.	"Hourglass" (featuring Liz)	Zedd; Elizabeth Nicole Abrams	5:13
2.	"Shave It Up"	Zaslavski	3:10
3.	"Spectrum" (featuring Matthew Koma)	Zaslavski; Koma; John Martin (singer)	4:03
4.	"Lost at Sea" (featuring Ryan Tedder)	Zaslavski; Tedder	3:45
5.	"Clarity" (featuring Foxes)	Zaslavski; Koma; Porter Robinson; Holly Hafermann	4:31
6.	"Codec"	Zaslavski	6:01
7.	"Stache"	Zaslavski	4:04
8.	"Fall into the Sky" (with Lucky Date featuring Ellie Goulding)	Zaslavski; Goulding; Lucky Date	3:37
9.	"Follow You Down" (featuring Bright Lights)	Zaslavski; Heather Bright	5:47
10.	"Epos"	Zaslavski	5:36

Deluxe edition bonus tracks
No.	Title	Writer(s)	Length
11.	"Stay the Night" (featuring Hayley Williams of Paramore)	Zaslavski; Benjamin Eli Hanna; Williams; Carah Faye	3:37
12.	"Push Play" (featuring Miriam Bryant)	Zaslavski; Bryant; Victor Rådström	3:37
13.	"Alive" (Zedd Remix) (with Empire of the Sun)	Nicholas Littlemore; Peter Mayes; Luke Steele; Jonathan Sloan; Steven Bach; Zaslavski	3:45
14.	"Breakn' a Sweat" (Zedd Remix) (with Skrillex and The Doors)	John Paul Densmore; Robert A. Krieger; Raymond D. Manzarek; Sonny Moore; Jim Morrison	4:33

Japanese edition bonus tracks
No.	Title	Writer(s)	Length
11.	"Spectrum" (livetune Remix) (featuring Matthew Koma and Hatsune Miku)	Zaslavski; Koma	5:57
12.	"Spectrum" (acoustic version) (featuring Matthew Koma)	Zaslavski; Koma	3:49
13.	"Clarity" (Zedd Union Mix) (featuring Foxes)	Zaslavski; Koma; Robinson; Hafermann	3:27

Target exclusive deluxe edition bonus tracks
No.	Title	Writer(s)	Length
15.	"Spectrum" (acoustic version) (featuring Matthew Koma)	Zaslavski; Koma	3:49
16.	"Clarity" (acoustic version) (featuring Foxes)	Zaslavski; Koma; Robinson; Hafermann	3:28

International Digital Deluxe bonus track
No.	Title	Writer(s)	Length
15.	"Clarity" (Remix) (featuring Medina)	Zaslavski; Koma; Robinson; Hafermann	4:31
16.	"Stay the Night" (Tiësto's Club Life Remix) (featuring Hayley Williams of Paramore)	Zaslavski; Hanna; Williams; Faye	5:22
17.	"Find You" (featuring Matthew Koma and Miriam Bryant)	Zaslavski; Koma; Bryant; Rådström	3:24

Apple Music International Digital Deluxe bonus videos
No.	Title	Director(s)	Length
18.	"Clarity" (Music video) (featuring Foxes)	Jodeb	4:35
19.	"Find You" (Music video) (featuring Matthew Koma and Miriam Bryant)	Jodeb	3:32
20.	"Spectrum" (Music video) (featuring Matthew Koma)	Petro	4:07
21.	"Stache" (Music video)	Roboto	4:11
22.	"Stay the Night" (Music Video) (featuring Hayley Williams)	Daniel Cloud Campos	3:37

== Personnel ==
Credits adapted from the liner notes of Clarity.

- Zedd – mastering, mixing, production (all tracks); additional backing vocals (tracks 1, 5); vocal editing (tracks 4, 5, 8); executive production
- Bright Lights – vocals (track 9)
- RJ Colston – additional backing vocals (track 5); additional vocals (track 8)
- Ruud van Eijk – outside inlay artwork
- Kevin Feller – additional backing vocals (track 5)
- Foxes – vocals (track 5)
- Ghostwriter – vocal engineering (track 5)
- Ellie Goulding – vocals (track 8)
- Mitch Kenny – recording engineering (track 9)
- Matthew Koma – vocals (track 3)
- Ashley Krajewski – vocal engineering (track 8)
- Matt LaMotte – marketing
- Liz – vocals (track 1)
- Lucky Date – production (track 8)
- Huntley Miller – mastering
- Malachi Mott – additional backing vocals (track 5)
- David D. Navarro aka Roboto – artwork
- Priya Prins – additional backing vocals (track 5)
- Dave Rene – vocals (track 2); A&R, management
- Drew Ressler – additional backing vocals (track 5)
- Porter Robinson – additional backing vocals (track 5)
- Ryan Shanahan – recording engineering (tracks 1, 3); additional engineering (tracks 2, 6, 7, 9, 10); vocal editing (tracks 4, 5, 8)
- Tim Smith AKA Bitvargen – management
- Jesse Taub – additional engineering (1–7, 9, 10); additional backing vocals (track 5); additional vocals (track 6)
- Ryan Tedder – additional engineering, vocals (track 4)

== Charts ==
=== Weekly charts ===
Chart (2012–14)	Peak position
Australian Dance Albums (ARIA)	23
Australian Hitseekers Albums (ARIA)	9
Japanese Albums (Oricon)	77
South Korean International Albums (Gaon)	70
Swedish Albums (Sverigetopplistan)	30
UK Albums (Official Charts)	104
UK Dance Albums (Official Charts)	8
US Billboard 200	38
US Top Dance Albums (Billboard)	2

=== Year-end charts ===
Chart (2013)	Position
US Top Dance/Electronic Albums (Billboard)	11

Chart (2014)	Position
Swedish Albums (Sverigetopplistan)	90
US Top Dance/Electronic Albums (Billboard)	10

== Certifications ==
Region	Certification	Certified units/sales
Canada (Music Canada)	Platinum	80,000^{‡}
New Zealand (RMNZ)	Gold	7,500^{‡}
Singapore (RIAS)	Gold	5,000^{*}
United States (RIAA)	Platinum	1,000,000^{‡}
^{*} Sales figures based on certification alone.^{‡} Sales+streaming figures based on certification alone.

== Release history ==
Standard edition

Region	Date	Format	Label	Ref.
United States	2 October 2012	CD; digital download	Interscope	
Germany	5 October 2012	Digital download	Universal	
United Kingdom	8 October 2012	CD; digital download	Polydor	
Canada	9 October 2012	CD; digital download	Universal	
Australia	12 October 2012	CD; digital download	Universal	
Germany	23 November 2012	CD	Universal	
Japan	27 February 2013	CD; digital download	Universal	

Deluxe edition

Region	Date	Format	Label	Ref.
United States	24 September 2013	CD; LP; digital download	Interscope	
Australia	25 October 2013	CD; digital download	Universal	
United Kingdom	17 February 2014	CD; digital download	Polydor	
Germany	7 March 2014	CD	Universal	
Germany	2 May 2014	Digital download	Universal	
