= Body Talk (Foxes song) =

Single by Foxes

from the album All I Need
- Released: 24 July 2015
- Genre: Synthpop
- Length: 3:29
- Label: Sign of the Times; Epic
- Songwriter(s): Louisa Allen; Jim Eliot; Andy White
- Producer(s): Jim Eliot

Foxes singles chronology
"Glorious" (2014)	"Body Talk" (2015)	"Better Love" (2015)

Music video
- "Body Talk (Official video)" on YouTube

"Body Talk" is a song by English singer and songwriter Foxes taken from her second studio album All I Need. The song was released in the United Kingdom on 24 July 2015 as the album's lead single. "Body Talk" swiftly returned Foxes to Scotland's & UK's Top 40 Singles Chart, scoring herself a 6th Top 40 hit.

== Music video ==
In order to promote "Body Talk", Foxes released a music video on 22 June 2015, which was 3 minutes 28 seconds in length.

== Track listing ==
- Digital download
1. "Body Talk" – 3:29
- Digital download – Remixes
1. "Body Talk" (Bakermat Remix) – 3:46
2. "Body Talk" (Bakermat Remix Instrumental) – 3:46
3. "Body Talk" (TCTS Remix) – 4:39
4. "Body Talk" (TCTS Remix Radio Edit) – 3:34
5. "Body Talk" (TCTS Extended Dub) – 4:03
- Digital download – Live EP
1. "Body Talk" (Live at Google) – 3:23
2. "Feet Don't Fail Me Now" (Live at Google) – 3:19
3. "Holding onto Heaven" (Live at Google) – 3:26
4. "Let Go for Tonight" (Live at Google) – 3:14
- Streaming – Live EP
1. "Body Talk" (Live at Google) – 3:23
2. "Feet Don't Fail Me Now" (Live at Google) – 3:19
3. "Holding onto Heaven" (Live at Google) – 3:26
4. "Youth" (Live at Google) – 2:53
5. "Let Go for Tonight" (Live at Google) – 3:14

== Charts ==
Chart (2015)	Peak position
Belgium (Ultratip Bubbling Under Flanders)	67
Ireland (IRMA)	100
Scotland (OCC)	9
UK Singles (OCC)	25

== Certifications ==
Region	Certification	Certified units/sales
United Kingdom (BPI)	Silver	200,000^{‡}
^{‡} Sales+streaming figures based on certification alone.

== Release history ==
Region	Date	Format	Label
United Kingdom	24 July 2015	Digital download	Sign of the Times
United Kingdom	20 November 2015	Digital download; Streaming	Sign of the Times
