= Glorious (Foxes album) =

- Standard cover (Note: The deluxe cover features a pink background with white text, replacing the black-and-white photo with a colored one.)

Studio album by Foxes
- Released: 9 May 2014
- Recorded: 2011–13
- Genres: Pop; electro-pop; dance-pop
- Length: 44:57
- Labels: Sign of the Times; Epic; RCA
- Producers: Future Cut; Kid Harpoon; Ghostwriter; Liam Howe; Ben Preston; Jarrad Rogers; Mike Spencer; Utters; Matt Wiggins

Foxes chronology
Warrior (2012)	Glorious (2014)	All I Need (2016)

Singles from Glorious
- 1. "Youth" Released: 6 September 2013; 2. "Let Go for Tonight" Released: 23 February 2014; 3. "Holding onto Heaven" Released: 4 May 2014; 4. "Glorious" Released: 12 August 2014

Glorious is the debut studio album by English singer and songwriter Foxes, originally due for release on 28 February 2014, but was pushed back to 12 May 2014, in favour of releasing the album simultaneously worldwide. The album is available in three versions: the standard album, a deluxe version and a limited edition vinyl.

== Background and release ==
After a spate of successful songs, appearing as a featured artist alongside Zedd, Fall Out Boy, Sub Focus and Rudimental as well as a successful single in "Youth", Foxes (Allen) showed intent at releasing a full album to steer away from the "featured artist" title. In an interview with Billboard, she stated the reason was "[...] Because I also have my music that's my baby." In an interview during the "Making of the Album" video featured on her VEVO page on YouTube, Allen calls the album "extremely personal", as well that its influence is from her childhood as well as growing up. She also claims the album is "me talking to myself", as music to her is a "form of therapy".

From the same video, Allen described her process for making the songs, in which she stated "I feel like the song already exists" and "I start with a big white piece of paper and I'll just write things I'm feeling [...] It kind of comes out of nowhere." The tracklist features several new songs, as well as two songs featured on her first EP Warrior (2012). The album was released on 12 May 2014, in both digital and physical formats. It has sold 83,009 copies to date in UK.

== Promotion ==
Although not classed as part of the promotion to the run up to Glorious, "Holding onto Heaven" was made available for free on iTunes during the month of December 2013. On 17 April 2014, Amazon Artist Lounge - EP was released to download from Amazon for free. It contains live versions of "Let Go for Tonight", "Youth" and "Holding onto Heaven".

=== Tour ===
Foxes embarked on a 16-date tour in England, Scotland and Ireland, which started 24 February 2014 and ended on 24 May 2014.

Tour dates
Date	City	Country	Venue
United Kingdom
24 February 2014	Liverpool	England	East Village Arts Club
25 February 2014	Birmingham	England	The Institute
26 February 2014	Glasgow	Scotland	King Tut's Wah Wah Hut
28 February 2014	Oxford	England	O2 Academy
1 March 2014	Nottingham	England	Stealth
2 March 2014	Brighton	England	The Haunt
4 March 2014	London	England	Scala
6 March 2014	Leeds	England	The Cockpit
7 March 2014	Bristol	England	Thekla
8 March 2014	Manchester	England	The Ruby Lounge
Ireland
10 March 2014	Dublin	Ireland	O2 Academy 2
United Kingdom
19 May 2014	Portsmouth	England	Wedgewood Rooms
20 May 2014	Brighton	England	Concorde 2
21 May 2014	London	England	Koko
23 May 2014	Sheffield	England	Leadmill
24 May 2014	Edinburgh	Scotland	Potterrow

== Singles ==
"Youth" was released as the album's lead single on 6 September 2013. The song reached number 12 on the UK Singles Chart. "Let Go for Tonight" was released as the album's second single on 23 February 2014. The song entered the UK Singles Chart at number 7, becoming her highest-peaking single and first top 10 single. "Holding onto Heaven" was released as the album's third single on 4 May 2014. It debuted on the UK Singles Chart at number 14. "Glorious" was confirmed to be the album's fourth single by Foxes, and it was released on 12 August 2014.

=== Other songs ===
"Shaking Heads" was available to download alongside the pre-order of the album. The live version of "Clarity" was made available to download for free on the Amazon MP3 store.

== Critical reception ==
Glorious ratings
Aggregate scores
Source	Rating
Metacritic	61/100
Review scores
Source	Rating
AllMusic	3.5/5 stars
Clash	7/10
Digital Spy	4/5 stars
DIY	4/5 stars
Financial Times	4/5 stars
The Guardian	3/5 stars
The Independent	3/5 stars
The Line of Best Fit	8/10
NME	6/10
The Observer	3/5 stars

Glorious received generally favourable reviews upon release. At Metacritic, which assigns a normalized rating out of 100 to reviews from mainstream publications, it received an average score of 61, based on 8 reviews.

Rob Knaggs from Clash remarked that "Foxes has made a pop album that, despite occasionally drifting into melodrama, serves as an enjoyable listen stuffed with genuine pop-gems, sun-baked choruses and enough bite to warrant repeated listens." Writing for The Guardian, Paul MacInnes noted that "while the lyrics are too cloying and cliched to mean much, in conjunction with such a button-pushing soundtrack, they still carry the capacity to move." Laurence Day from The Line of Best Fit praised "Let Go for Tonight" for having "literally everything you want in massive single – the chorus, the hooks, the singalongability" and noted that Foxes "tends to deal with matters similar to Icona Pop", particularly those that are "centred around being youthful, frivolous and socially clumsy". In a review for AllMusic, Fred Thomas said that "while the infectiousness of singles like 'Youth' and 'Let Go for Tonight' is undeniable, so often artists like Foxes can't quite rise to the challenge of filling out an entire album's worth of solid material around a few hits" although also stating that "the album on the whole is wrapped in a unique atmosphere that somehow manages to be both darkly moody and carefree." Writing for Digital Spy, Lewis Corner commended the album, saying that it "strives to be celestial, booming and chart-worthy - and for the majority, it hits that mark" further noting "Let Go for Tonight" as the standout track "[resulting] in a magnificent centerpiece for Glorious; a stellar debut album that deserves to make Foxes a household name once and for all." Shefali Srivastava from DIY praised the title track's "huge, stunning chorus" and described Glorious as "sweeping, dramatic electro-pop" that balances light and dark with intention and power, adding that Foxes' days under the radar may be numbered.

Holly Williams from The Independent was less impressed, describing Glorious as a "summery package; glossily produced and personality free". Williams noted it sits in the overcrowded big-vocal dance-pop realm alongside Miley Cyrus, Rihanna, Ellie Goulding, and Florence + The Machine, but "fails to make me either blub or buzz". Killian Fox of The Observer noted that "though the album is formulaic and polished, there is enough crackle in its dark, lustrous soundscapes and tales of nocturnal romance to intrigue – and Allen's voice has the power to match those booming drums." Alex Denney from NME noted similarities between "Youth" and "Talking to Ghosts" to the music of Bat for Lashes as well as comparing "Let Go for Tonight" to Bonnie Tyler's "Holding Out for a Hero" and concluded the review stating that "Glorious is no failure". Writing for Financial Times, Ludovic Hunter-Tilney pointed out that Glorious is "designed for maximum exposure" and is "a big-screen production."

== Track listing ==
Glorious – Standard edition
No.	Title	Writer(s)	Producer(s)	Length
1.	"Talking to Ghosts"	Louisa Allen; Liam Howe; Michael Martens; Ralf Doerper; Andreas Thein	Howe	4:21
2.	"Youth"	Allen; Jonny Harris	Ghostwriter	4:19
3.	"Holding onto Heaven"	Allen; Harris; Toby Gad	Ghostwriter; Mike Spencer; Future Cut^{[a]}	3:31
4.	"White Coats"	Allen; Harris	Ghostwriter	4:06
5.	"Let Go for Tonight"	Allen; Tom Hull	Mike Spencer; Kid Harpoon; Future Cut^{[a]}; Ben Preston^{[a]}	3:58
6.	"Night Glo"	Allen; Howe	Howe	4:25
7.	"Night Owls Early Birds"	Allen; Jarrad Rogers	Rogers; Ghostwriter^{[a]}	3:29
8.	"Glorious"	Allen; Harris	Ghostwriter; Spencer	4:21
9.	"Echo"	Allen; Harris	Ghostwriter; Matt Wiggins^{[a]}	4:04
10.	"Shaking Heads"	Allen; Howe	Howe	4:47
11.	"Count the Saints"	Allen; Ben Mark	Ghostwriter	3:36
Total length:				44:57

Glorious – Deluxe edition
No.	Title	Writer(s)	Producer(s)	Length
12.	"Clarity" (Live)	Anton Zaslavski; Holly Brook; Matthew Koma; Porter Robinson	Ghostwriter	3:33
13.	"Beauty Queen"	Allen; Jonny Wright; Dan Radclyffe	Utters; Ghostwriter^{[a]}	4:22
14.	"Home"	Allen; Harris	Ghostwriter	3:35
15.	"In Her Arms"	Allen; Radclyffe; Wright	Utters	4:45
16.	"The Unknown"	Allen; Harris	Ghostwriter	4:14
Total length:				65:26

=== Notes ===
- ^{^[a]} signifies an additional producer.
- "Talking to Ghosts" samples "Dr. Mabuse" performed by Propaganda and produced by Trevor Horn.

== Personnel ==
Credits adapted from AllMusic.

- Louisa Allen – primary artist, composer
- Iyiola Babalola – percussion, programming
- Tony Cousins – mastering
- Ralf Dörper – composer
- Steve Fitzmaurice – mixing, programming
- Future Cut – additional production
- Toby Gad – composer
- Ghostwriter – additional production, mixing, producer, programming
- Jonny Harris – bass, composer, drum programming, drums, instrumentation, piano, programming, synthesizer, background vocals
- Darren Heelis – bass guitar, Korg synthesizer, mixing assistant, programming
- Liz Horsman – assistant, programming
- Liam Howe – composer, engineer, mixing, producer
- Tom Hull – composer
- Sam Kennedy – piano
- Darren Lewis – piano, programming
- Ben Mark – composer
- Paul McLean – cover photo
- Michael Mertens – composer
- Chad Pickard – cover photo
- Ben Preston – additional production
- Jarrad Rogers – bass, composer, drums, engineer, guitar, piano, producer, programming, Wurlitzer
- Jamie Snell – engineer
- Mike Spencer – additional production, bass, drums, bass guitar, keyboards, mixing, producer
- Andreas Thein – composer
- Matt Wiggins – Additional production
- Tim Young – mastering

== Charts ==
Weekly chart performance for Glorious
Chart (2014)	Peak position
Australian Albums (ARIA)	36
Irish Albums (IRMA)	11
Japanese Albums (Oricon)	69
New Zealand Albums (RMNZ)	29
Scottish Albums (Official Charts)	5
UK Albums (Official Charts)	5
UK Album Downloads (Official Charts)	3
US Heatseekers Albums (Billboard)	27

== Certifications ==
Certifications for Glorious
Region	Certification	Certified units/sales
United Kingdom (BPI)	Silver	60,000^{*}
^{*} Sales figures based on certification alone.

== Release history ==
Region	Date	Format(s)	Label	Ref.
Australia	9 May 2014	CD; digital download	Sony	
Germany	9 May 2014	CD; digital download	Sony	
Mexico	12 May 2014	CD; digital download	Sign of the Times	
United Kingdom	12 May 2014	CD; digital download	Sign of the Times	
United States	23 June 2014	CD; digital download	RCA	
