= Spectrum (song) =

2012 single by Zedd featuring Matthew Koma

Single by Zedd featuring Matthew Koma

from the album Clarity
- Released: June 4, 2012
- Genre: Electro house; progressive house; complextro
- Length: 4:03
- Label: Interscope
- Songwriters: Matthew Koma; Anton Zaslavski; John Martin; Gareth Emery; Demi Lovato
- Producer: Zedd

Zedd singles chronology
"Shave It" (2011)	"Spectrum" (2012)	"Clarity" (2012)

Matthew Koma singles chronology
"Spectrum" (2012)	"Years" (2012)

Music video
- "Spectrum" on YouTube

"Spectrum" is a song by Russian–German electronic music producer Zedd. It features American musician Matthew Koma. It was released as a single on June 4, 2012, and serves as the second single from Zedd's debut studio album Clarity. It was written by Koma and Zedd.

An extended play of the track – featuring remixes by Armin van Buuren, Arty, Deniz Koyu, as well as Congorock – was released on July 31, 2012. It also features a track titled "Human" (a collaboration with Nicky Romero), which was also released as a single on July 31, 2012.

TVXQ's Yunho, Super Junior's Donghae and Eunhyuk, EXO's Kai and Lay and SHINee's Taemin and Minho under the project name S.M. The Performance released a Korean version, featuring the vocals of Taemin, Donghae and Yunho. This version was released on December 30, 2012, by S.M. Entertainment and the proceeds were given to charity.

There is also a Japanese remix, which features English vocals by Hatsune Miku, made by the Japanese music group, Livetune, which is featured in the Japanese release of Zedd's album Clarity. Livetune had originally remixed the song as a fan of Zedd's music and Zedd was impressed with the result of the remix and asked for it to be included in the Japanese release as a bonus track.

== Production ==
"Spectrum" was written and produced by Zedd, with vocals and additional writing from Matthew Koma. Zedd started with the chord progression, saying that he "wasn't sure if it would be a really hard club song or end up being a song for another artist." After Koma finished touring with LMFAO, he emailed Zedd that he wanted to work together again. Zedd finished producing the instrumental for "Spectrum", and brought him to the studio to show him the beat. According to Zedd, "he was singing along, and I heard parts of the melody which I liked. I forced him to stay a few hours even though he was tired as s***." He also said the lyrics took quite a few weeks to write.

== Release ==
"Spectrum" was released on June 4, 2012. Zedd said he wanted "Spectrum' to be Clarity's lead single because he felt "like it sums up my album the best so far. It has vocals. It has instrumental parts. It has everything." [...] it shows what the album will be about so well."

== Music video ==
The official music video for the song premiered on August 15, 2012, shot at the Pink Motel in Sun Valley, California. It is directed by Petro, photographed by cinematographer Steve Gainer ASC ASK, and stars Taryn Manning and Derek Magyar.

Discussing the video with Rolling Stone, Zedd said the following:

I wanted the video to capture the ever-changing energy and emotion of the song through real human feelings ... It takes you on a journey through love, loss, contentment and anxiety. Musically, the chord progression I wrote captured the feeling and tension, unpredictability and the unknown. The video portrays this through a relationship between a man (human) and woman (alien) & the dynamics/excitement between the two of them.

== Track listing ==
All versions of "Spectrum" listed below feature Matthew Koma.

CD single and digital download

1. "Spectrum" (Radio Edit) – 4:03
2. "Spectrum" (Extended Mix) – 6:01

Digital download (EP)

1. "Spectrum" (Extended Mix) – 6:01
2. "Spectrum" (Armin van Buuren Remix) – 6:28
3. "Spectrum" (A-Trak and Clockwork Remix) – 5:05
4. "Spectrum" (Arty Remix) – 6:05
5. "Spectrum" (Deniz Koyu Remix) – 6:35
6. "Spectrum" (Gregori Klosman and Tristan Garner Knights Remix) – 4:57
7. "Spectrum" (Congorock Remix) – 5:42
8. "Spectrum" (Monsta Remix) – 5:30
9. "Spectrum" (Acoustic Version) – 6:01
10. "Human" (with Nicky Romero) – 4:17

Digital download (Shreddie Mercury Remix) (Beatport exclusive)

1. "Spectrum" (Shreddie Mercury Remix) – 5:18

Other versions

- "Spectrum" (Headhunterz Edit) – 4:00 (Available as a free track on Headhunterz' SoundCloud page.)
- "Spectrum" (KDrew Remix) – 4:40
- "Spectrum" (Livetune Remix) (featuring Matthew Koma and Hatsune Miku) – 3:21 (This release is a Japan-only exclusive remix.)

=== Unofficial Remixes ===
1. "Spectrum (Johnny Wolinger Remix)" – 5:00

== Personnel ==
- Zedd – producer, songwriter
- Matthew Koma – songwriter, vocalist

== Charts ==
=== Weekly charts ===
Chart (2012–2013)	Peak position
Australia Club (ARIA)	30
Austria (Ö3 Austria Top 40)	30
Belgium (Ultratip Bubbling Under Flanders)	74
Belgium Dance (Ultratop Flanders)	21
Belgium Dance Bubbling Under (Ultratop Wallonia)	12
Germany (GfK)	80
Italian Airplay (EarOne)	85
Japan Hot 100 (Billboard)	4
Poland Dance (ZPAV)	37
South Korea International Songs (GAON)	112
US Bubbling Under Hot 100 (Billboard)	5
US Hot Dance/Electronic Songs (Billboard)	10
US Dance Airplay (Billboard)	1
US Dance Club Songs (Billboard)	1
US Pop Airplay (Billboard)	36

=== Year-end charts ===
Year	Chart	Peak position
2012	US Hot Dance Club Songs (Billboard)	1
2013	Japan (Japan Hot 100)	41
2013	US Dance/Electronic Songs (Billboard)	40

== Certifications ==
Region	Certification	Certified units/sales
Australia (ARIA)	Gold	35,000^{‡}
Brazil (Pro-Música Brasil)	Gold	30,000^{‡}
United States (RIAA)	Platinum	1,000,000^{‡}
^{‡} Sales+streaming figures based on certification alone.

== Release history ==
Release dates and formats for "Spectrum"
Region	Date	Format	Label(s)	Ref.
United States	August 14, 2012	Mainstream airplay	Interscope	

== SM The Performance cover ==
"Spectrum"

Single by SM The Performance
- Released: December 30, 2012
- Recorded: SM Studios in Seoul
- Genre: Electro house; complextro; dubstep
- Length: 4:03
- Label: SM
- Songwriters: Matthew Koma; Anton Zaslavski
- Producers: Zedd; Matthew Koma

The song was covered by the dance unit group, SM The Performance, which includes members of SM Town. The cover was released as a digital download on December 30, 2012, in South Korea under the label of SM Entertainment. The first dance performance of "Spectrum" was during 'SBS Gayo Daejeon' held on December 29, 2012. The choreography was created by NappyTabs who previously collaborated with Christina Aguilera, BoA's "Only One" and TVXQ's "Humanoids". The vocals were provided by Yunho of TVXQ, Donghae of Super Junior and Taemin of Shinee. In addition to these, other members of SM The Performance include Eunhyuk of Super Junior, Minho of Shinee, Kai and Lay of Exo.

Chart (2013)	Peak position
South Korea (Gaon)	43

== See also ==
- List of number-one dance singles of 2012 (U.S.)
- List of number-one dance airplay hits of 2012 (U.S.)
