= Shave It =

Single by Zedd

from the album Clarity
- Released: 4 October 2011
- Genre: Electro house; complextro
- Length: 4:51
- Label: Owsla
- Songwriter: Anton Zaslavski
- Producer: Zedd

Zedd singles chronology
"The Anthem" (2010)	"Shave It" (2011)	"Spectrum" (2012)

"Shave It" is a song by Russian-German electronic music producer Zedd. The song was produced and written by Zedd, and released on 4 October 2011 via Skrillex's record label Owsla. The song peaked at number 4 on the Billboard Hot Dance Club Songs chart on 3 March 2012. An extended play of the track – featuring remixes by Kaskade, Tommy Trash, and 501 – was released on 8 November 2011, titled Shave It – The Aftershave.

The alternate version of the song, "Shave It Up", is included on Zedd's debut studio album, Clarity. The extended version was released exclusively on Beatport on 22 October 2012. Another song that incorporates the use of "Shave It" is Zedd's song "Hourglass" (featuring LIZ), the track before "Shave It Up" in Clarity. After the 4 minutes of the main part of the song, it becomes a 1:15-prelude to "Shave It Up".

== Music video ==
A music video directed by Sean Stiegemeier and produced by Mike Longenbach was released on 1 November 2011. As of January 2015, the video has received over 2,000,000 views on YouTube.

== Track listing ==
Shave It – The Aftershave

EP by Zedd
- Released: 8 November 2011
- Genre: Electro house; complextro
- Length: 17:53
- Label: OWSLA
- Producer: Zedd

Zedd chronology
Shave It – The Aftershave (2011)	Clarity (2012)

CD single and digital download
No.	Title	Length
1.	"Shave It"	3:31
2.	"Shave It" (Kaskade Remix)	5:33
3.	"Shave It" (Tommy Trash Remix)	4:40
4.	"Shave It" (501 Remix)	4:09
Total length:		17:53

Digital download (Extended Mix) (Beatport exclusive)
No.	Title	Length
1.	"Shave It Up" (Extended Mix)	4:48

== Personnel ==
- Zedd – producer, songwriter

== Charts ==
"Shave It" debuted at number 39 on the Hot Dance Club Songs chart for the week of 21 January 2012 and climbed until position four.

Chart (2012)	Peak position
US Hot Dance Club Songs (Billboard)	4
