= Stay the Night (Zedd song) =

2013 single by Zedd featuring Hayley Williams

Single by Zedd featuring Hayley Williams of Paramore

from the album Clarity
- Released: 23 September 2013
- Recorded: 2012
- Genre: Electro house; dance-pop; EDM
- Length: 3:37
- Label: Interscope
- Songwriters: Anton Zaslavski; Hayley Williams; Benjamin Eli Hanna; Carah Faye Charnow
- Producer: Zedd

Zedd singles chronology
"Clarity" (2012)	"Stay the Night" (2013)	"Push Play" (2013)

Hayley Williams singles chronology
"Rainbow Connection" (2011)	"Stay the Night" (2013)	"Vicious Love" (2015)

Music video
- "Stay the Night" on YouTube

"Stay the Night" is a song by Russian-German electronic dance music producer Zedd, from the deluxe edition (2013) of his debut studio album, Clarity (2012). It features vocals from Hayley Williams, the lead singer of American rock group Paramore. The song was written by Zedd, Williams, Benjamin Eli Hanna (believed to be a secret moniker of Nate Ruess), and Carah Faye, and produced by Zedd. "Stay the Night" was released to digital retailers on 23 September 2013, by Interscope Records as the lead single off the deluxe edition of Clarity, and the fourth overall single from the album.

The song has been compared to Zedd's previous electro house hit "Clarity", with Critic of Music saying "Stay the Night" is primed for "pop radio". Digital Spy said the song was "generic EDM", and Idolator pointed to its EDM-style club-ready dance beats, "dreamy" synths, and a pop-style vocal. "Stay the Night" received critical acclaim, with some critics noting the song's potential for crossover appeal to audiences of mainstream pop.

The single reached the number one spot on both Billboard's Hot Dance Club Songs and Dance/Mix Show Airplay charts in its issue dated 7 December 2013, giving Zedd his second number one at Dance Airplay and his third chart-topper at Dance Club Play, while Williams gained her first number one on a Billboard chart (at Dance/Mix Show Airplay) as a solo artist. The song has reached the top twenty in fifteen countries and sold over two million copies in the U.S. by September 2017.

== Critical reception ==
Idolator editor Mike Wass called the song "another soaring house anthem with massive crossover potential" and praised the "inspired" choice of vocalist: "Hayley Williams puts her trademark angsty rock leanings to the side ... and she lends the track a certain credibility outside the ever-growing EDM market."

James Shotwell of the entertainment news blog, Under the Gun Review gave "Stay the Night" a mixed review. While stating the song "is destined for dance club glory" and will "fit nicely" on contemporary hit radio, Shotwell also criticized its lack of uniqueness.

Music blog Critic of Music gave the song an A− rating, noting that while the song suffers in comparison to previous single "Clarity", particularly in the weakness of its lyrics, "Stay the Night" is still successful at highlighting Williams' "vocal versatility" and Zedd's "excellent, radio-friendly" dance beats.

"Stay the Night" won the MTV Clubland Award in the 2014 MTV Video Music Awards.

== Track listing ==
Digital download
No.	Title	Length
1.	"Stay the Night" (featuring Hayley Williams)	3:37

CD single
No.	Title	Length
1.	"Stay the Night" (album version)	3:37
2.	"Stay the Night" (Zedd and Kevin Drew Remix)	4:03

Digital download – EP
No.	Title	Length
1.	"Stay the Night" (DJ Snake Remix)	5:06
2.	"Stay the Night" (Tiesto's Club Life Remix)	5:22
3.	"Stay the Night" (Schoolboy Remix)	6:40
4.	"Stay the Night" (Nicky Romero Remix)	5:37
5.	"Stay the Night" (Henry Fong Remix)	4:08
6.	"Stay the Night" (Zedd and Kevin Drew Remix)	4:03

Digital download (Zedd and Kevin Drew Remix)
No.	Title	Length
1.	"Stay the Night" (Zedd and Kevin Drew Remix)	4:03

Digital download (Zedd and Kevin Drew Extended Remix)
No.	Title	Length
1.	"Stay the Night" (Zedd and Kevin Drew Extended Remix)	4:48

== Charts and certifications ==
=== Weekly charts ===
Weekly chart performance
Chart (2013–2014)	Peak position
Australia (ARIA)	11
Austria (Ö3 Austria Top 40)	12
Belgium (Ultratip Bubbling Under Flanders)	10
Belgium (Ultratip Bubbling Under Wallonia)	14
Canada Hot 100 (Billboard)	20
Canada CHR/Top 40 (Billboard)	8
Canada Hot AC (Billboard)	20
CIS Airplay (TopHit)	6
Czech Republic Airplay (ČNS IFPI)	15
Finland (Suomen virallinen lista)	15
Finnish Airplay (Radiosoittolista)	12
Germany (GfK)	15
Hungary (Editors' Choice Top 40)	18
Ireland (IRMA)	8
Italy (FIMI)	13
Italian Airplay (EarOne)	35
Netherlands (Single Top 100)	85
Israel (Media Forest TV Airplay)	1
New Zealand (Recorded Music NZ)	20
Norway (VG-lista)	19
Poland Airplay (ZPAV)	6
Poland Dance (ZPAV)	21
Poland (Polish TV Airplay Chart)	1
Russia Airplay (TopHit)	8
Scottish Singles Sales (Official Charts)	1
Slovakia Airplay (ČNS IFPI)	82
Slovenia (SloTop50)	36
Sweden (Sverigetopplistan)	47
Switzerland (Schweizer Hitparade)	56
UK Singles (Official Charts)	2
UK Dance (Official Charts)	2
Ukraine Airplay (TopHit)	36
US Billboard Hot 100	18
US Adult Pop Airplay (Billboard)	23
US Dance Club Songs (Billboard)	1
US Hot Dance/Electronic Songs (Billboard)	2
US Latin Airplay (Billboard)	36
US Pop Airplay (Billboard)	6
US Rhythmic Airplay (Billboard)	18

=== Year-end charts ===
2013 year-end chart performance
Chart (2013)	Position
US Hot Dance/Electronic Songs (Billboard)	22

2014 year-end chart performance
Chart (2014)	Position
Canada (Canadian Hot 100)	87
Germany (Official German Charts)	99
Russia Airplay (TopHit)	74
Ukraine Airplay (TopHit)	97
UK Singles (OCC)	91
US Billboard Hot 100	94
US Hot Dance/Electronic Songs (Billboard)	9
US Mainstream Top 40 (Billboard)	40

=== Decade-end charts ===
Decade-end chart performance for "Stay the Night"
Chart (2010–2019)	Position
US Hot Dance/Electronic Songs (Billboard)	49

=== Certifications ===
Certifications and sales
Region	Certification	Certified units/sales
Australia (ARIA)	3× Platinum	210,000^{‡}
Austria (IFPI Austria)	Gold	15,000^{*}
Brazil (Pro-Música Brasil)	Platinum	60,000^{‡}
Germany (BVMI)	Gold	150,000^{‡}
Italy (FIMI)	Gold	15,000^{‡}
New Zealand (RMNZ)	Platinum	30,000^{‡}
Sweden (GLF)	Platinum	40,000^{‡}
United Kingdom (BPI)	Platinum	600,000^{‡}
United States (RIAA)	2× Platinum	2,000,000^{‡}
Streaming
Denmark (IFPI Danmark)	Gold	1,300,000^{†}
^{*} Sales figures based on certification alone.^{‡} Sales+streaming figures based on certification alone.^{†} Streaming-only figures based on certification alone.

== Release history ==
Release dates
Country	Date	Format
Worldwide	23 September 2013	Digital download
United States	8 October 2013	Contemporary hit radio airplay
United States	4 November 2013	Digital remix EP
United Kingdom	10 February 2014	Digital download

== See also ==
- List of number-one dance singles of 2013 (U.S.)
