= Glorious (Foxes song) =

Single by Foxes

from the album Glorious
- Released: 10 August 2014
- Recorded: 2011
- Genre: Pop
- Length: 4:22 (album version); 3:39 (radio edit)
- Label: Sign of the Times
- Songwriter(s): Louisa Rose Allen; Jonny Harris
- Producer(s): Ghostwriter; Mike Spencer

Foxes singles chronology
"Holding Onto Heaven" (2013)	"Glorious" (2014)	"Body Talk" (2015)

"Glorious" is a song by English singer and songwriter Foxes. It is the fourth single from her debut studio album, Glorious. The song was released as a digital download in the United Kingdom on 10 August 2014.

== Background ==
Foxes officially announced "Glorious" as the fourth single from her debut album on 5 June 2014. She announced it from the set of the video shoot, which took place in Barcelona.

== Music video ==
The music video for "Glorious" confirmed on the date Foxes announced the next single would be "Glorious", on 5 June 2014. She made the announcement from the set for the video shoot in Barcelona. The music video was directed by Justin Anderson. The music video begins with the title "Welcome to Glorious", and features Foxes singing in tennis clothes, whilst sitting down at a table at what appears to be a health spa. Patrons are sat amongst the tables with their faces mostly blocked by flowers on the tables as Foxes sings to the camera. The video continues on showing scenes of patrons lazing about in a pool, and working out. The video ends with one person being pushed into the pool as Foxes sings next to it. The video totals 3 minutes and 43 seconds.

== Track listings ==
- Digital download
1. "Glorious" (Radio Edit) – 3:39
- Digital remixes EP
1. "Glorious" (Mike Mago Remix) – 6:05
2. "Glorious" (Everything Everything Remix) – 4:15
3. "Glorious" (Great Good Fine OK Remix) – 5:18
4. "Glorious" (Zoo Station Remix) – 5:18

== Charts ==
Chart (2014)	Peak position
Scotland (OCC)	68
UK Singles (OCC)	97

== Release history ==
Region	Date	Format	Label
United Kingdom	10 August 2014	Digital download	Sign of the Times
