= Deniz Koyu =

Turkish-German disc jockey (born 1985)

- Also known as: KO:YU
- Born: Deniz Akçakoyunlu; 29 April 1985 (age 41); Bochum, North Rhine-Westphalia, Germany
- Origin: Turkish
- Genres: Progressive house, electro house
- Occupations: Musician, DJ, record producer
- Instruments: Keyboards, mixer, synthesizer
- Years active: 2007–present
- Labels: Protocol Recordings, Spinnin' Records, Axtone Records, Refune Records, Flamingo Recordings, Recovery House, Netswork Records

Deniz "Koyu" Akçakoyunlu (born April 29, 1985, in Bochum) is a Turkish-German disc jockey and electronic dance music producer who specializes in progressive house and electro house.

== Career ==
He has collaborated with some of the most successful electronic dance music artists such as Alesso, Nicky Romero, Dimitri Vegas & Like Mike, Galantis and Fedde le Grand and has released singles on Spinnin’ Records, Axtone, Protocol Recordings, Sony Music and more record labels. He has also delivered remixes for artists such as David Guetta, Zedd or Anitta. His success allowed him to play the main stages of popular festivals like Tomorrowland, Ultra Miami, EDC and Creamfields and landed him a residency at Wynn Las Vegas.

In 2012 he headlined his own bus tour alongside Danny Avila named ‘Generation Wild’ which included shows in 25 cities across North America within 4 weeks.

== Formative Influence ==
In his teenage years he was influenced by anything electronic, ranging from trance to techno, underground to indie dance pop, disco house to electro house. Some of the artists he lists as early childhood inspirations are Daft Punk, Michael Jackson, Kraftwerk and Giorgio Moroder.

== Discography ==
=== Singles ===
==== Charted singles ====
| Title | Year | Charts | Album |
| Title | Year | BEL | Album |
|---|---|---|---|
| "Tung!" | 2014 | 35 | Non-album single |

==== 2021 ====
- "Am I" (with Raiden)
- "Stay Wasted" (featuring Richard Judge)

==== 2020 ====
- "Flavours" (with Nø Signe)
- "Next To You"
- "Go"
- "Destiny" (with Nicky Romero featuring Alexander Tidebrink)
- "Feel It" (with Magnificence)

==== 2019 ====
- "Enemy" (with Ralph Felix featuring Mph)
- "Lost Soul"
- "Automatic"
- "Eclipse"

==== 2018 ====
- "Paradise" (with Nicky Romero featuring Walk off the Earth)
- "Atlantis"
- "Trippy" (with The Cliqque)
- "15 Sleeps" (featuring RuthAnne)

==== 2017 ====
- "A Way Home" (with Don Palm)

==== 2016 ====
- "Roads" (vs Dimitri Vegas and Like Mike)
- "Don't Wait" (featuring Example)

==== 2015 ====
- "Never Alone" (with Thomas Gold)
- "The Way Out" (featuring Amba Shepherd)
- "Sonic"
- "Lift" (with Don Palm)

==== 2014 ====
- "To The Sun"
- "Goin' Down" (vs Twoloud)
- "Ruby"

==== 2013 ====
- "Halo" (with Dirty South)
- "Rage"

==== 2012 ====
- "Bong"
- "Follow You" (feat. Wynter Gordon)
- "Turn It" (with Fedde Le Grand and Johan Wedel)

==== 2011 ====
- "Tung!"
- "Hertz"
- "Hydra"

==== 2010 ====
- "Milton & The Nodheads"
- "Lose Control" (featuring Jason Caesar)
- "Time of Our Lives" (featuring Shena)
- "Magnitude"
- "Grunge"
- "What We Are"

==== 2009 ====
- "The Young Ones"
- "Feel This" (featuring Martin Sola)

==== 2007 ====
- "Taste Me"
- "Smash Up"

=== Remixes ===
==== 2020 ====
- Gryffin featuring Maia Wright - "Body Back" (Deniz Koyu Remix)

==== 2019 ====
- Alesso - "Time" (Alesso and Deniz Koyu Remix)

==== 2018 ====
- Galantis - "Mama Look at Me Now" (Galantis and Deniz Koyu VIP Mix)
- Ralph Felix - "No Excuses" (KO:YU and Ralph Felix Remix)
- Anitta, Mc Zaac, Maejor Feat. Tropkillaz & DJ Yuri Martins – "Vai Malandra" (Alesso & KO:YU Remix)

==== 2016 ====
- "Aviators" ("Lift" Vocal Mix - with Don Palm)
- Alesso - "I Wanna Know" (Alesso and Deniz Koyu Remix)

==== 2015 ====
- Nick Martin – "Red Lion" (Deniz Koyu Remix)
- Pep & Rash – "Rumors" (Deniz Koyu Remix)
- Eddie Thoneick – "Solar" (Deniz Koyu Edit)

==== 2014 ====
- Röyksopp and Robyn – "Do It Again" (Deniz Koyu Remix)

==== 2013 ====
- Krewella – "Live for the Night (Danny Avila & Deniz Koyu Remix)"

==== 2012 ====
- Miike Snow – "Pretender (Deniz Koyu Remix)"
- Zedd featuring Matthew Koma – "Spectrum" (Deniz Koyu Remix)
- Junkie XL featuring Isis Salam – "Off The Dancefloor (Deniz Koyu Remix)"
- Fedde Le Grand – "So Much Love (Deniz Koyu Remix)"
- David Guetta featuring Taped Rai – "Just One Last Time (Deniz Koyu Remix)"
- Digitalism – "Zdarlight (Fedde Le Grand & Deniz Koyu Remix)"

==== 2011 ====
- Kaskade featuring Rebecca & Fiona – "Turn It Down (Deniz Koyu Remix)"
- James Blunt – "Dangerous (Deniz Koyu & Johan Wedel Remix)"
- Flo Rida featuring Akon – "Who Dat Girl (Deniz Koyu Remix)"
- Michael Canitrot and Ron Carroll – "When You Got Love (Deniz Koyu Remix)"
- Jean Elan featuring Cosmo Klein – "Feel Alive (Deniz Koyu Remix)"
- Amloop – "Caminhando E Cantando (Deniz Koyu Remix)"

==== 2010 ====
- Timofey and Bartosz Brenes vs. Terri B! – Heaven (Deniz Koyu Remix)"
- Hype Jones & Alex Sayz – "Never Give Up (Deniz Koyu Remix)"
- John Dahlbäck – "Back to the Dancefloor (Deniz Koyu Remix)"
- Yenson – "My Feeling (Deniz Koyu Remix)"
- Dave Darell – "I Just Wanna Live (Deniz Koyu Remix)"

==== 2009 ====
- Niels van Gogh – "Dreamer (Deniz Koyu & Micha Moor Remix)"

==== 2008 ====
- Capilari and Salvavida – "Oye Como Va (Micha Moor & Deniz Koyu Remix)"
- Guru Da Beat and Tres Amici – "One Love (Deniz Koyu Remix)"
- Yvan and Dan Daniel – "In Heaven (Join Me) (Deniz Koyu Remix)"
- Atrocite – "Temptations (Deniz Koyu Remix)"
- Horny United vs. DJ Sign – "Oohhh (Deniz Koyu Remix)"

==== 2007 ====
- Kid Chris – "South Beach (Micha Moor & Deniz Koyu Remix)"
- Yanou – "A Girl Like You (Deniz Koyu Remix)"
- Jay North featuring Charles Thambi – "Drifting (Deniz Koyu Mix)"
- Atrocite featuring Mque – "Only You (Deniz Koyu Mix)"
- EmSlice and Denga – "So Sexy (Deniz Koyu's Robotsex Remix)"
