= Sky Love =

Single by Foxes

from the album The Kick
- Released: 3 November 2021
- Genre: Dance-pop
- Length: 3:25
- Label: PIAS
- Composers: Louisa Rose Allen; Jonny Harris; Jon Green
- Lyricist: Louisa Rose Allen
- Producers: Roosevelt; James Greenwood

Foxes singles chronology
"Dance Magic" (2021)	"Sky Love" (2021)	"Absolute" (2022)

Lyric video
- "Sky Love" on YouTube

"Sky Love" is a song by English singer and songwriter Foxes. It was released on 3 November 2021 through PIAS Recordings, as the third single from her third studio album, The Kick (2022).

== Background and release ==
"Sky Love" follows the previously released singles "Sister Ray" and "Dance Magic". It was written by Louisa Rose Allen, alongside Jonny Harris and Jon Green. The track was produced by Roosevelt, with additional production from James Greenwood.

The song was announced on 2 November, with Foxes confirming that it would be released as the album's third single the following day. On 3 November, the song was released alongside the album's official track listing, appearing as the eleventh track on The Kick.

In the single's press release, Foxes said of the track:

[It's about] "craving the kind of love that seems unimaginable, drives you crazy and is all consuming. A love that feels otherworldly and like nothing you’ve felt before."

— Foxes on the meaning of "Sky Love", via The Line of Best Fit

== Music video ==
An accompanying visualizer, directed by Florence Kosky, was released on 3 November 2021. The video incorporates the song's lyrics and features the singer in a cloudy cosmic disco-themed bedroom, dressed in pyjamas.

== Reception ==
Writing for Rolling Stone India, Amit Vaidya dubbed the song "instantly memorable", praising its production that it "fits perfectly into the current pop landscape". Robin Murray for Clash described the track as "a disco-tinged burner with a gently euphoric feel". J.T. Early of Beats Per Minute praised the song "modernised dance production" and its "soaring chorus". Mandy Rogers of EQ Music gave the song a positive review, calling it as a "silky, disco-pop gem".

== Track listing ==
- Digital download and streaming
1. "Sky Love" — 3:25
- Digital download and streaming - Acoustic
1. "Sky Love" (Acoustic) — 4:11
- Digital download and streaming - Tobtok Remix
1. "Sky Love" (Tobtok Remix) — 2:58

== Personnel ==
Credits adapted from Apple Music.

- Louisa Rose Allen — vocals, composer, lyrics
- Jon Green — composer
- Jonny Harris — composer
- James Greenwood — producer
- Roosevelt — producer
- Geoff Swan — mixing engineer

== Release history ==
"Sky Love" release history
Region	Date	Format(s)	Label	Version	Ref.
Various	3 November 2021	Digital download; streaming	PIAS Recordings	Original	
Various	8 December 2021	Digital download; streaming	PIAS Recordings	Acoustic	
Various	17 December 2021	Digital download; streaming	PIAS Recordings	Tobtok Remix	
