= All I Need (Foxes album) =

Studio album by Foxes
- Released: 5 February 2016
- Recorded: 2015
- Genre: Pop; EDM
- Length: 41:46
- Label: Sign of the Times; Epic; RCA
- Producer: Mark Ralph; Tim Bran; Roy Kerr; Jim Eliot; Dan Wilson; Ashley Hayes; Jesse Shatkin; Liam Howe

Foxes chronology
Glorious (2014)	All I Need (2016)	Friends in the Corner (2021)

Singles from All I Need
- 1. "Body Talk" Released: 24 July 2015; 2. "Better Love" Released: 4 September 2015; 3. "Amazing" Released: 4 December 2015

All I Need is the second studio album by English singer-songwriter Foxes, released on 5 February 2016. Developed throughout 2015 primarily in Los Angeles, the album reflects a shift toward more pared-back, relationship-focused songwriting influenced by personal journaling. Musically, it incorporates vocal-centric pop with piano, strings, and cinematic production elements, drawing on both 1980s pop and modern electronic styles.

The album was preceded by a promotional campaign that included the singles "Body Talk", "Better Love", and "Amazing", as well as four promotional singles supported by initiatives, such as the H&M Loves Music campaign. Foxes also issued multiple acoustic versions of several tracks and conducted a UK tour in late 2015 in support of the album.

Upon release, All I Need received generally positive critical notices with Metacritic score of 67. Reviews highlighted the album's polished pop production and emotional clarity, while some critics regarded it as conventional. Commercially, the album reached number 12 on the UK Albums Chart and also charted in Australia, Ireland, Japan, Spain, Switzerland, and the United States.

== Background ==
Foxes started work on the album in January 2015 in Los Angeles. Commenting on the album's direction, Foxes said "I was inspired a lot more with this record with stripping things back and making it a lot more emotional. I didn't want to do a concept album, I always like it when I can write from a diary in a way. It's quite an emotional album. It's got elements from the first one, but it's definitely not as produced. The tracks feel a lot more vocal [with] piano and strings. It's still cinematic in ways but I'm a lot more honest on this record this time around, which is quite a scary thing to be." She has also said that the album was inspired by relationships.

== Promotion ==
=== Singles ===
"Body Talk" was released as the album's lead single on 24 July 2015 in the United Kingdom. On her Facebook page, Foxes announced that the second single would be "Better Love", co-written by Dan Smith from Bastille. The song which features Smith's vocals was released on 4 September 2015. "Amazing" was released as the album's third single on 4 December 2015.

=== Promotional singles ===
A video for "Feet Don't Fail Me Now" was launched by H&M as part of the H&M Loves Music campaign. The second promotional single, "If You Leave Me Now", was released on 27 November 2015. "Devil Side" was released as the third, and "Wicked Love" was released as the fourth promotional single.

=== Acoustic versions ===
Acoustic versions of a few tracks from All I Need have been released onto Vevo. All of them feature Foxes singing into a mic and Sam Kennedy, Foxes' keyboard player for live performances, playing the piano. Including the acoustic version for "Devil Side" on 7 February 2016, The acoustic version for "Scar" was released on 23 February 2016. The acoustic version for "On My Way" was released on 28 February 2016.

=== Tour ===
In July 2015, Foxes announced a tour in anticipation of the release of the album throughout October 2015.

== Critical reception ==
Professional ratings
Aggregate scores
Source	Rating
Metacritic	67/100
Review scores
Source	Rating
AllMusic	4/5 stars
The Guardian	3/5 stars
The Irish Times	3/5 stars
The National	3.5/5 stars
NME	4/5
The Observer	4/5 stars
Pitchfork	4.9/10
PopMatters	7/10 stars
Rolling Stone	3.5/5 stars
Clash	2/10

All I Need received generally positive reviews from music critics. At Metacritic, which assigns a normalized rating out of 100 to reviews from mainstream critics, the album has an average score of 67 out of 100, which indicates "generally favorable reviews" based on 9 reviews.

Neil Z. Yeung of AllMusic described All I Need as a "refreshing blast of deftly produced, stylish pop," comparing its strengths to artists like Marina and Carly Rae Jepsen. Rachel Aroesti of The Guardian noted the album's exploration of emotional conflict in toxic relationships, calling it both accomplished and slightly unsettling. Lauren Murphy of The Irish Times highlighted the album's stylistic range, referencing its 1980s Madonna influences, dubstep-pop elements, and traces of Sia's songwriting style. Nich March of The National described the album as a breakup-themed collection blending accessible EDM with reflective ballads. John Calvert of NME, giving the album 4 out of 5 stars, praised All I Need as a confident and lustrous pop album that balances personal, grassroots British pop with universal appeal, positioning Foxes as a leading figure in revitalizing British pop on the global stage. Lisa Henderson of Clash gave the album 2 out of 10 stars, criticizing it as a generic, hitmaker-driven pop record lacking the distinct identity Foxes once had.

== Commercial performance ==
All I Need sold 7,724 copies in its first week inside of the United Kingdom, which resulted in a debut chart position of 12. As of November 2016 the album has sold 13,000 copies in the UK and 16,500 worldwide. According to Official Charts Company data, All I Need has vended 36,463 copies to date.

== Track listing ==
All I Need – Standard edition
No.	Title	Writer(s)	Producer(s)	Length
1.	"Rise Up (Intro)"	Louisa Rose Allen; Jonas Quant	Mark Ralph	0:58
2.	"Better Love"	Allen; Jonny Harris; Dan Smith	Tim Bran; Roy Kerr	3:35
3.	"Body Talk"	Allen; Jim Eliot	Eliot	3:29
4.	"Cruel"	Allen; Kid Harpoon	Ralph	3:46
5.	"If You Leave Me Now"	Allen; Eliot	Eliot	4:51
6.	"Amazing"	Allen; Martin Brammer; Jonny Lattimer; James Newman	Ralph	3:47
7.	"Devil Side"	Allen; Dan Wilson	Wilson; Felix Snow (add.)	3:59
8.	"Feet Don't Fail Me Now"	Allen; Fransisca Hall; Jesse Shatkin	Shatkin	3:23
9.	"Wicked Love"	Allen; Rick Nowels; MoZella	Ralph	3:14
10.	"Scar"	Allen; Kenneth Edmonds; Janée Bennett; Antonio Dixon; Khristopher Riddick-Tynes; JP Saxe	Bran; Kerr	3:08
11.	"Money"	Allen; Quant	Ralph	3:14
12.	"On My Way"	Allen; Shatkin	Bran; Kerr	4:22
Total length:				41:46

All I Need – Deluxe edition
No.	Title	Writer(s)	Producer(s)	Length
13.	"Shoot Me Down"	Allen; Quant; Harpoon	Ralph	3:38
14.	"Lose My Cool"	Allen; Jonny Harris; Bnann; Charlie Fink	Ralph	3:22
15.	"All I Need"	Allen; Liam Howe; Hannah Robinson	Howe	3:49
16.	"Rise Up (Reprise)"	Allen; Quant	Ralph	2:35
Total length:				55:10

All I Need – Japanese edition
No.	Title	Writer(s)	Producer(s)	Length
17.	"Body Talk" (live)	Allen; Jim Eliot	Eliot	3:23
18.	"Holding onto Heaven" (live)	Allen; Harris; Toby Gad	Ghostwriter; Mike Spencer; Future Cut	3:26
19.	"Let Go for Tonight" (live)	Allen; Tom Hull	Kid Harpoon; Spencer; Future Cut; Ben Preston	3:14
20.	"Youth" (live)	Allen; Jonny Harris	Ghostwriter	2:51
Total length:				55:10

== Personnel ==
Musicians

- Foxes – vocals
- Ben Kennedy – drums (tracks 1, 2, 4, 6, 9–14, 16), percussion (1, 4, 6, 9, 11, 13, 14, 16), background vocals (6, 9, 11)
- Sam Kennedy – keyboards (1, 4, 9, 11, 13, 14, 16), programming (1, 4), background vocals (9, 11, 13, 14), percussion (9, 11), piano (9–14, 16)
- Rosie Langley – violin (1, 16)
- Dan Smith – background vocals (2)
- Jonny Harris – background vocals (2)
- Roy Kerr – keyboards, programming (2, 10, 12); performance arrangement (12)
- Sam Dixon – keyboards (2, 6), background vocals (6)
- Tim Bran – keyboards, programming (2, 10, 12); background vocals, guitar (10)
- Davide Rossi – strings (2, 10)
- Jim Eliot – drums, guitar, keyboards, synthesizer (3, 5)
- Sally Herbert – performance arrangement (5)
- Chris Worsey – cello (5)
- Ian Burdge – cello (5)
- Bruce White – viola (5)
- Max Baillie – viola (5)
- Rachel Robson – viola (5)
- Alison Dods – violin (5)
- Everton Nelson – violin (5)
- Ian Humphries – violin (5)
- Julia Singleton – violin (5)
- Richard George – violin (5)
- Rick Koster – violin (5)
- Tom Pigott-Smith – violin (5)
- Dan Wilson – bass guitar, drums, organ, piano, strings (7)
- Felix Snow – programming (7)
- John Rausch – programming (7)
- Brian Brundage – synthesizer (7)
- Ken Chastain – tambourine (7)
- Jesse Shatkin – bass guitar, piano, programming (8)
- Danny Levin – brass (8)
- Erick Serna – guitar (8)
- Peter Lee Johnson – violin (8)
- David Moyer – woodwinds (8)
- Charlie Fowler – bass guitar (9, 11), background vocals (11)
- Juliet Roberts – background vocals (10, 12)
- Alfie Ralph – vocals (11)
- Arthur Anstee – vocals (11)
- Betty Pearce – vocals (11)
- Billy-Ray Ralph – vocals (11)
- Bluebelle Carroll – vocals (11)
- Cassady Carroll – vocals (11)
- Darcey Garland – vocals (11)
- Frida Storp – vocals (11)
- Harvey Anstee – vocals (11)
- Jack Garland – vocals (11)
- Jade Morgan Meredith – vocals (11)
- Kitty Faith – vocals (11)
- Lily Turner – vocals (11)
- Madeline Bruce – vocals (11)
- Misty Soni – vocals (11)
- Ronnie Ball – vocals (11)
- Roxy Harcourt – vocals (11)
- Savannah Lumley – vocals (11)
- Scarlett Faith – vocals (11)
- Sylvie Turner – vocals (11)
- Tippi Rose Bruce – vocals (11)
- Hannah Robinson – background vocals (15)
- Theo Vinden – cello (15)
- Natalie Cavey – viola (15)
- Gillian Maguire – violin (15)
- Stephanie Cavey – violin (15)

Technical

- Matt Colton – mastering
- Mark Ralph – mixing (1, 3–7, 9–14, 16)
- Mark Stent – mixing (2)
- Liam Howe – mixing (15)
- Jesse Shatkin – mixing, engineering (8)
- Drew Smith – engineering (1, 4, 5, 7, 9–14, 16)
- Tom Fuller – engineering (1, 4, 5, 7, 9–14, 16)
- Jack Ruston – engineering (2, 10, 12)
- Julian Burg – engineering (8)
- Geoff Green – engineering assistance (2)

== Charts ==
Chart (2016)	Peak position
Australian Albums (ARIA)	53
Irish Albums (IRMA)	48
Japanese Albums (Oricon)	111
Scottish Albums (OCC)	15
Spanish Albums (PROMUSICAE)	102
Swiss Albums (Schweizer Hitparade)	99
UK Albums (OCC)	12
UK Album Downloads (OCC)	6
US Heatseekers Albums (Billboard)	8
