= Metal rock =

Metal rock may refer to:

- Heavy metal music
- Metal rock
- metal ore
- metallic asteroid

== See also ==
- Meteoritic iron
