= Friends in the Corner =

EP by Foxes
- Released: 1 April 2021
- Genre: Pop
- Length: 27:40
- Label: PIAS

Foxes chronology
All I Need (2016)	Friends in the Corner (2021)	The Kick (2022)

Singles from Friends in the Corner
- 1. "Love Not Loving You" Released: 20 May 2020; 2. "Woman" Released: 29 July 2020; 3. "Friends in the Corner" Released: 2 September 2020; 4. "Hollywood" Released: 4 December 2020; 5. "Kathleen" Released: 17 March 2021

Friends in the Corner is the second extended play by English singer and songwriter Foxes. It was released on 1 April 2021 through PIAS Recordings, and preceded by five singles, "Love Not Loving You", "Woman", "Friends in the Corner", "Hollywood" and "Kathleen".

== Background and theme ==
Following the release of her second studio album, All I Need (2016), Foxes took a four-year hiatus from music. In February 2018, she teased new music, stating, "Thank you for your patience with this next record [...] I will be releasing new music this year and I can't wait to share it with you". She eventually confirmed her comeback in May 2020 with the single "Love Not Loving You", followed by "Woman" and "Friends in the Corner". Foxes described Friends in Corner as "an emotional whirlpool" and highlighted its intimate as well as "extremely personal" subject matter. While it includes uplifting moments, she noted that it also ventures into more dramatic and emotionally charged territory.

== Composition ==
Friends in the Corner EP includes a mix of previously released and new tracks that explore personal and emotional themes. "Love Not Loving You" serves as a bold, energetic return following Foxes' hiatus, while "Friends in the Corner" touches on the quiet vulnerabilities of mental health. "Hollywood" reflects on challenges faced while chasing dreams in Los Angeles, and "Woman" offers a message of resilience and standing against injustice. "Kathleen" is a personal tribute to her grandmother. The EP also features three new tracks: "Courage", "Dance", and an acoustic version of "Kathleen".

== Release and promotion ==
Friends in the Corner's lead single, "Love Not Loving You", was released on 20 May 2020. Foxes' first release in four years, it also marks her first release with her new record label PIAS, after departing from RCA Records and Sign of the Times. The second single, "Woman", was released on 29 July. The EP was followed by two more singles, "Friends in the Corner" (on 2 September) and "Hollywood" (on 4 December).

Foxes released "Kathleen" as the fifth single on 17 March 2021, along with a YouTube premiere of its music video. The announcement of Friends in the Corner's release coincided with the song's premiere, and the EP was made available for pre-order on 19 March.

== Critical reception ==
Professional ratings
Review scores
Source	Rating
AllMusic	3/5 stars

Neil Z. Yeung of AllMusic described Friends in the Corner as a varied and emotive pop EP that previews Foxes' next chapter, blending nostalgic anthems with sweeping ballads.

== Track listing ==
Friends in the Corner track listing
No.	Title	Writer(s)	Producer(s)	Length
1.	"Friends in the Corner"	Louisa Rose Allen; James Flannigan	Oli Bayston	3:29
2.	"Kathleen"	Allen; Courage; Laura Dockrill	Charlie Hugall; Courage	3:51
3.	"Love Not Loving You"	Allen; Jon Green; Jack Leonard; Jonny Harris	Cheap Cuts; Luke Smith	3:34
4.	"Hollywood"	Allen; Green; Leonard; Harris	Cheap Cuts; Green	3:20
5.	"Dance"	Allen; Jennifer Decilveo	Bayston; Rich Cooper	3:20
6.	"Woman"	Allen; Paul Dixon	Dixon	3:14
7.	"Courage"	Allen; Dixon	Smith	4:07
8.	"Kathleen" (Live Acoustic)	Allen; Courage; Dockrill	Hugall; Courage	3:57
Total length:				27:40
