= The Kick (album) =

Studio album by Foxes
- Released: 11 February 2022
- Genre: Dance-pop
- Length: 40:28
- Label: PIAS
- Producer: James Greenwood

Foxes chronology
Friends in the Corner (2021)	The Kick (2022)

Singles from The Kick
- 1. "Sister Ray" Released: 15 September 2021; 2. "Dance Magic" Released: 13 October 2021; 3. "Sky Love" Released: 3 November 2021; 4. "Absolute" Released: 7 January 2022; 5. "Body Suit" Released: 26 January 2022

The Kick is the third studio album by English singer and songwriter Foxes. It was released on 11 February 2022 through PIAS Recordings. The album was preceded by the singles "Sister Ray", "Dance Magic", "Sky Love", "Absolute" and "Body Suit".

== Background ==
In April 2021, Foxes released the EP Friends in the Corner after a four-year hiatus from music. A month earlier, while announcing the EP, she teased a new album and stated that it would be featuring different material from the EP.

== Release and promotion ==
The album was preceded by the lead single "Sister Ray". The single was announced on 10 September 2021 and released 5 days later on 15 September. The second single, "Dance Magic", was released on 13 October. On 2 November, Foxes announced the third single, "Sky Love", would be released the next day. On the same day, she announced through her socials that her third studio album was going to be titled The Kick, and revealed a release date of 11 February 2022, as well as the album's cover art. She later announced she was embarking on The Kick Tour 2022, with a set opening date in Glasgow on 11 February 2022.

"Absolute" was released as the fourth single on 7 January 2022. The fifth single, "Body Suit", was released on 26 January 2022, it served as the final single before the album's release.

== Critical reception ==
The Kick ratings
Aggregate scores
Source	Rating
Metacritic	80/100
Review scores
Source	Rating
AllMusic	4/5 stars
Beats Per Minute	7.2/10
DIY	3.5/5 stars
The Line of Best Fit	4/5 stars

The Kick received critical acclaim from music critics. At Metacritic, which assigns a normalised rating out of 100 to reviews from mainstream critics, the album has an average score of 80 out of 100, based on four reviews.

== Track listing ==
The Kick track listing
No.	Title	Writer(s)	Producer(s)	Length
1.	"Sister Ray"	Louisa Rose Allen; James Greenwood; Amy Kuney	Greenwood	3:40
2.	"The Kick"	Allen; Greenwood; Thomas Havelock	Greenwood	3:21
3.	"Growing on Me"	Allen; Laura Dockrill; Finn Keane	Alex Metric; Greenwood	3:10
4.	"Potential"	Allen; Greenwood; Morgan Nagler	Greenwood	3:34
5.	"Dance Magic"	Allen; Greenwood; Havelock	Greenwood	2:46
6.	"Body Suit"	Allen; Greenwood; Nagler	Greenwood	4:03
7.	"Absolute"	Allen; Greenwood; Jack Leonard	Greenwood	3:11
8.	"Two Kinds of Silence"	Allen; Greenwood; Kuney	Greenwood	3:08
9.	"Forgive Yourself"	Allen; Greenwood; Leonard	Greenwood	3:31
10.	"Gentleman"	Allen; Nate Cyphert; Alexandra Robotham	Oli Bayston; Greenwood	3:49
11.	"Sky Love"	Allen; Johnny "Ghostwiter" Harris; Jonathan Green	Roosevelt	3:25
12.	"Too Much Colour"	Allen; Leonard; Harris	Harris; Leonard	2:56
Total length:				40:28

== Charts ==
Chart performance for The Kick
Chart (2022)	Peak position
Scottish Albums (OCC)	71
UK Album Downloads (OCC)	28
UK Independent Albums (OCC)	18

== Release history ==
Release history and formats for The Kick
Region	Date	Format	Edition(s)	Label	Ref.
Various	11 February 2022	Digital download; streaming	Standard	PIAS	
Various	22 April 2022	CD	Standard; deluxe	PIAS	
Various	29 July 2022	Vinyl	Standard	PIAS	
