= Amazing (Foxes song) =

Single by Foxes

from the album All I Need
- Released: 4 December 2015
- Recorded: 2015
- Genre: Dance-pop
- Length: 3:47
- Label: Sign of the Times
- Songwriters: Louisa Allen; Martin Brammer; Jonny Lattimer; James Newman
- Producer: Mark Ralph

Foxes singles chronology
"Better Love" (2015)	"Amazing" (2015)	"Cruel" (2016)

"Amazing" is a song recorded by English singer-songwriter Foxes for her second studio album "All I Need". It was released as the album's third single on 4 December 2015.

== Critical reception ==
Tayla Dickinson of Kube Radio said about the track, "True to its word, 'Amazing' is very self-descriptive and carries an almost quintessential upbeat, mood lifting vibe that any great song you can never grow tired of needs."

== Music video ==
The official music video was directed by Johny Mourgue, and released via Foxes' VEVO and YouTube account on 17 December 2015.

Commencing the video, is an asleep Louisa Allen (Foxes), who is then woken up by her two friends. Subsequently, Foxes begins packing a suitcase, while also cutting her own hair. The trio of girls then embark on a fun road trip in their classic Volkswagen van, using a paper map to help guide them along the way. With an old camcorder, some of their experiences are recorded, such as: playing with a blue teddy bear, smashing cake, and eating ice-cream voraciously. They also played at a video game arcade, but that event was not recorded with a camcorder. The trio arrive at a dingy bar, where they sing karaoke, and get wasted with others. This leads to the culmination of the video, where the viewer observes the now dizzy and drunk trio making their way back to their van.

== Track listing ==
Digital download
No.	Title	Length
1.	"Amazing"	3:47

Cahill Remix
No.	Title	Length
1.	"Amazing" (Cahill Club Mix)	5:16

== Charts ==
Chart (2016)	Peak position
Scotland Singles (Official Charts)	69
