= Youth (Foxes song) =

2012 debut single by Foxes

"Youth" (re-release)
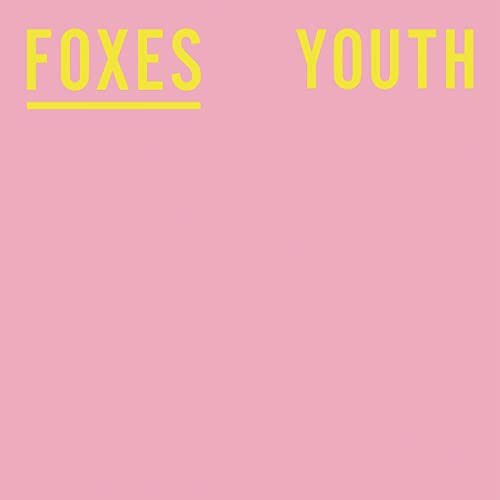

Single by Foxes

from the album Glorious
- B-side: "Home"
- Released: 16 January 2012; 20 August 2013 (re-release)
- Recorded: 2011
- Genre: Pop
- Length: 4:21
- Label: Sign of the Times
- Songwriters: Jonny Harris; Louisa Rose Allen
- Producer: Jonny Harris

Foxes singles chronology
"Right Here" (2013)	"Youth" (re-release) (2013)	"Let Go for Tonight" (2014)

Alternative cover
- Original 7" single artwork (Note: After Allen was signed to Sign of the Times, it was re-released digitally.)

Foxes singles chronology
"Youth" (2012)	"Clarity" (2012)

Music video
- "Youth" on YouTube

"Youth" is the debut solo single by English singer and songwriter Foxes. Initially released as a 7" single through Neon Gold on 16 January 2012, the song was later re-released digitally in the United States on 20 August 2013 and sent to top 40 radio in the United Kingdom on 2 October 2013 as the lead single from her debut studio album Glorious (2014). The song was written by Allen and Jonny Harris, with production from the latter. The song has topped the US Hot Dance Club Songs and peaked at number 12 on the UK Singles Chart.

== Music video ==
A music video to accompany the release of "Youth" was first released onto YouTube on 12 August 2013 at a total length of three minutes and thirty-two seconds. The video starts with her in an office, before she breaks free from the grey work environment after a fire burns a hole in the wall. The version of "Youth" used in the music video is 49 seconds shorter than the album version. A radio edit of this song also exists, which is the same as the video version, but with a different and longer ending.

== Critical reception ==
Robert Copsey of Digital Spy gave the song a very positive review stating:

"It was the first song where I thought, 'OK, now I can see the vision, now I can see the album'," Foxes recently said of her new single 'Youth'. We say new, but for the singer – real name Louisa Rose Allen – and serious pop fans, the song's journey from its birth to major label release has been a slow and often painful one, after she delayed its release and spent the intervening months guesting on songs for Rudimental and Zedd. Fortunately, 'Youth' still sounds as fresh and exciting as it did some 18 months after its premiere. "Don't tell me our youth is running out, it's only just begun" she sings over galloping beats and mournful electro throbs that build to a glorious strobing finale that acts as a fitting end to the summer months. Its trajectory may well have been slow and steady, but it looks like Foxes is still on course to win the race.

== Track listing ==
7" single
No.	Title	Length
1.	"Youth"	4:21
2.	"Home"	3:39

Digital download
No.	Title	Length
1.	"Youth"	4:21
2.	"Youth" (radio edit)	3:44
3.	"Youth" (Breakage remix)	4:28
4.	"Youth"	5:38
5.	"Youth" (Seamus Haji remix)	6:37
6.	"Youth" (Danny Howard remix)	5:09

UK remix EP
No.	Title	Length
1.	"Youth" (Adventure Club remix)	3:59
2.	"Youth" (Le Youth remix)	3:56
3.	"Youth" (Jakob Liedholm remix)	5:30
4.	"Youth" (Maze & Masters remix)	5:40

Adventure Club remix – US digital download
No.	Title	Length
1.	"Youth" (Adventure Club remix)	3:59

Orchestral version – digital download
No.	Title	Length
1.	"Youth" (orchestral)	3:09

US remixes EP
No.	Title	Length
1.	"Youth" (Disco Fries remix)	5:53
2.	"Youth" (Liam Keegan remix)	5:51
3.	"Youth" (Funk Generation club mix)	5:52
4.	"Youth" (Varsity Team extended mix)	4:57

== Chart performance ==
=== Weekly charts ===
Chart (2013)	Peak position
Belgium (Ultratip Bubbling Under Flanders)	26
Belgium (Ultratop Flanders Dance Bubbling Under)	7
Ireland (IRMA)	21
Scotland Singles (Official Charts)	7
UK Singles (Official Charts)	12
UK Singles Downloads (Official Charts)	13
US Hot Dance Club Songs (Billboard)	1

== Certifications ==
Region	Certification	Certified units/sales
United Kingdom (BPI)	Silver	200,000^{‡}
^{‡} Sales+streaming figures based on certification alone.

== Release history ==
Region	Date	Format	Version(s)	Label	Ref.
Various	16 January 2012	7" single	Original	Neon Gold	
United States	20 August 2013	Digital download	Original	RCA	
United States	25 September 2013	Digital download	Adventure Club remix	Sign of the Times; Sony	
United Kingdom	2 October 2013	Top 40 radio	Radio edit	Sign of the Times; Sony; Epic	
United Kingdom	4 October 2013	Digital download	EP	Sign of the Times; Sony	
United Kingdom	6 October 2013	Digital download	Original	Sign of the Times; Sony	
United States	8 October 2013	Digital download	EP	RCA	
United Kingdom	25 October 2013	Digital download	Remixes EP	Sign of the Times; Sony	
Various	1 November 2013	Digital download	Orchestral	Sign of the Times; Sony	
United States	18 November 2013	Digital download	Remixes EP	Sign of the Times; Sony	

== See also ==
- List of Billboard Dance Club Songs number ones of 2013
