= Clarity (Zedd song) =

2012 single by Zedd featuring Foxes

Single by Zedd featuring Foxes

from the album Clarity
- Released: 14 November 2012
- Genre: Dance-pop; progressive house
- Length: 4:31
- Label: Interscope
- Songwriters: Anton Zaslavski; Matthew Bair; Porter Robinson; Holly Hafermann
- Producers: Zedd; Jonny "Ghostwriter" Harris

Zedd singles chronology
"Spectrum" (2012)	"Clarity" (2012)	"Stay the Night" (2013)

Foxes singles chronology
"Youth" (2012)	"Clarity" (2012)	"Right Here" (2013)

Music video
- "Clarity" on YouTube

"Clarity" is a song by the German musician Zedd featuring the vocals of the English singer Foxes. It was released on 14 November 2012 as the third single from Zedd's debut studio album, Clarity. The song began as a collaboration with the American musician Porter Robinson and uses a vocal melody written by the American songwriter Matthew Koma. Characterized as a progressive house and dance-pop song, "Clarity" was the first top-10 hit on the US Billboard Hot 100 for both Zedd and Foxes, and their first top-40 hit on the UK Singles Chart. It received multi-platinum certifications. In 2014, it won the Grammy Award for Best Dance Recording at the 56th Grammy Awards.

== Background and production ==
The German musician Zedd began "Clarity" as a collaboration with the American musician Porter Robinson amid their Poseidon tour. They began producing the song and its chords together until their tour ended. Zedd then finished the song alone as an instrumental. The vocal part of "Clarity" was initially written by Matthew Koma for another of Zedd's tracks, "Lost at Sea". Zedd felt that that topline was "too emotional" for that song, and instead used it for "Clarity". Zedd sent a demo of the song to Robinson, who did not enjoy the result and told Zedd to finish the song himself.

Zedd tried to find multiple singers for "Clarity", but he wasn't happy with any of their vocals, and even considered not including the song on the Clarity album. However, "days before the deadline", his manager showed him the English singer Foxes, which Zedd enjoyed. He contacted the singer via Skype for a 15 minutes chat, who accepted the offer to sing on "Clarity". The American singer Skylar Grey is credited as a co-writer, who had recorded vocals for the track before Foxes was chosen. The English musician Jonny Harris, credited as "Ghostwriter", recorded Foxes's vocals.

== Composition ==
"Clarity" has a tempo of 128 beats per minute, and is written in the A♭ major key. Characterized as dance-pop and progressive house, the song was described by Spin's Brennan Carley as "nouveau disco for the masses by way of choral-infused electronica", and Andy Kellman of AllMusic described it as "stadium-ready". According to Billboard, the "searching synths" of the track play under the "sweet, love-pained vocals" of Foxes. They called the lyrics "evocative yet accessible", and Kellman said they "reflect the immediacy and desperation of adolescent relationships". Billboard described the drop as "big room-reminiscent" and coming "like a waterfall, more a cascade of notes than a barrage of noise".

== Release ==
"Clarity" appeared on Zedd's debut album Clarity, first released in Germany on 5 October 2012. The song was first sent to contemporary hit radio in Italy on 14 November 2012. In January 2013, Zedd and Foxes performed an orchestral version of the song at Late Night with David Letterman. On 1 February, it was released as a standalone single on Apple Music, and a 4-track remix EP released on 12 February, featuring remixes from Zedd himself, Tiësto, Style of Eye, and Brillz. The song impacted US radio stations on 5 March. Zedd released an extended mix of the song exclusively on Beatport on 18 February 2018.

=== Music video ===
A music video for "Clarity" directed by Jodeb was released on 11 January 2013. The video starts with the camera panning over the desert, and switches to see Foxes and the male lead driving in different cars, until they suddenly collide head-to-head, and both characters rocket backwards. The male lead wakes up after being knocked unconscious from the collision, and finds the injured Foxes, who then runs away through the desert. He follows her until she falls unconscious in the sand. A rewind of the whole event is shown and, in the final scene, the two characters drive in the same car.

== Reception and legacy ==
Billboard found the production "top-notch", with Vice describing the refrain as "joyous" and the synth lines as "divine". Chris DeVille of Stereogum said that Foxes's "powerful voice lends [the song] so much oomph", with Peter Kadunias of Gigwise calling her vocals "gorgeous". Billboard praised the lyrics as "perfect" and "heart-wrenching". Kellman felt it was one of the "peak moments" of the Clarity album. "Clarity" was nominated for Artist to Watch at the 2013 MTV Video Music Awards. It won the Grammy Award for Best Dance Recording at the 56th Grammy Awards in 2014, in what Zedd called "an unbelievable and unforgettable moment in my life". It remains Zedd and Foxes's only nomination and win in the awards. It was nominated for Best Musical Collaboration at the 2014 Radio Disney Music Awards and Top Dance/Electronic Song at the 2014 Billboard Music Awards.

Billboard named it one of the "50 game-changing EDM tracks" of 2013. In 2015, Spin named it the tenth greatest EDM anthem of the first half of the 2010s. In 2016, Billboard chose it as the best song in Zedd's discography, saying: "'Clarity' was one of the genre’s first big crossover anthems, but it set a standard in pop that moves far beyond festival stages". In 2017, Vice ranked it as the 73rd best EDM song of all time. In 2019, Billboard staff considered it the 19th greatest dance song of the decade. That same year, Chris DeVille of Stereogum named "Clarity" a one-hit wonder for Foxes. In 2023, Billboard ranked it the 15th best EDM love song, and in 2025, they named it the 96th best dance song of all time.

== Commercial performance ==
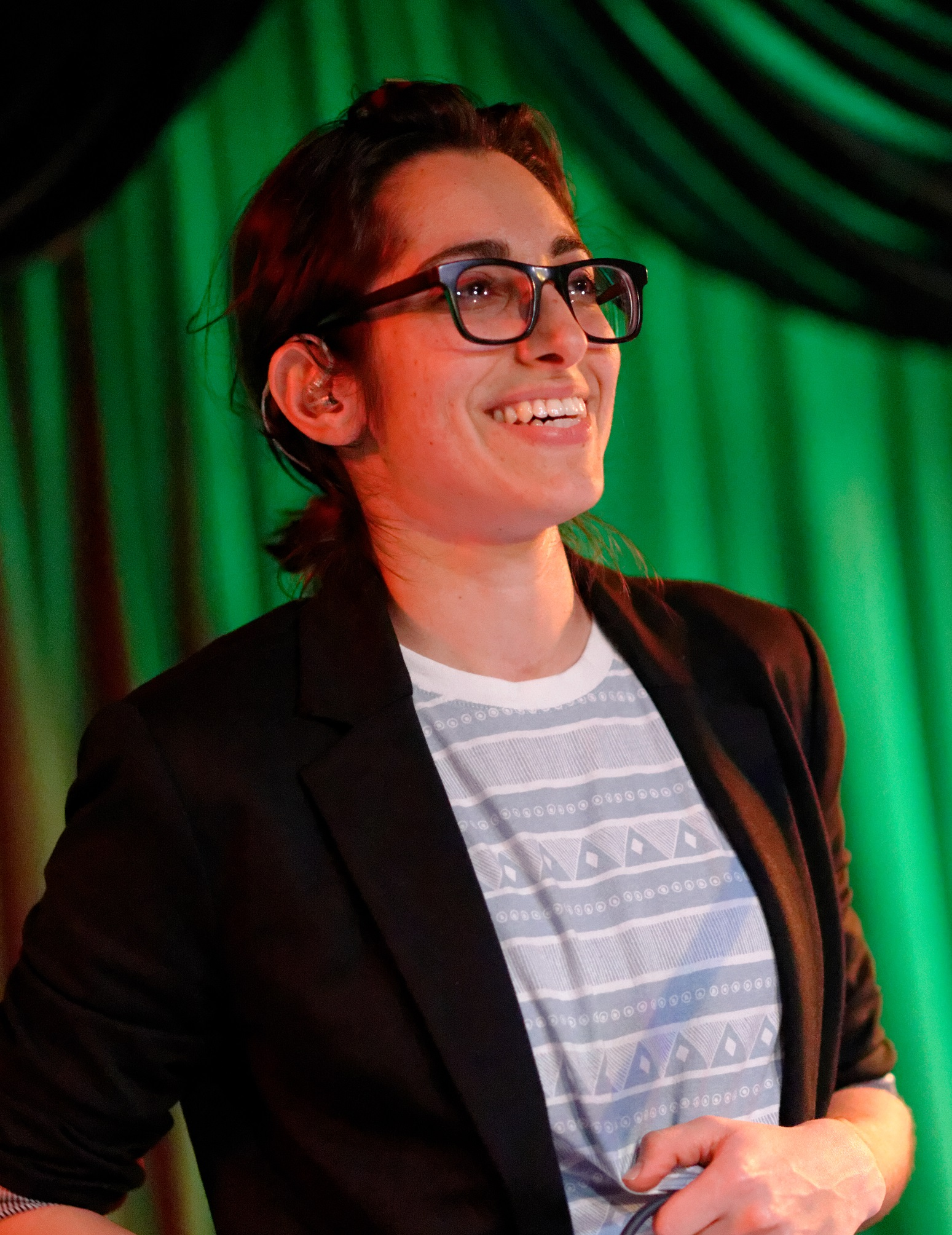
A cover by Michelle Chamuel launched "Clarity" into the top-20 of the US Billboard Hot 100.

While "Spectrum" was Zedd's first number-one dance hit, "Clarity" was Zedd's break-out pop crossover. In North America, "Clarity" was in the top-20 of Billboard's "Hot 100" charts for the US and Canada, the few record charts in the world to combine sales, streaming and airplay data.

Following a performance of "Clarity" by Michelle Chamuel on The Voice USA on June 10, 2013, Zedd's recording soared from 24 to 14, with a 44% rise in digital sales (105,000, 24–13 on the download component chart) and 15% increase in radio impressions (52 million, 26–16 on the radio component chart). It entered the top-ten on the chart issued August 17, 2013 at the number-eight spot, the second week of the tracking year where there were three new songs in the top-ten. Pitchfork's Noah Yoo, in 2019, cited the EDM track "without a traditional chorus" becoming a top-ten hit an example of EDM's dominance in the 2010s. "Clarity" was the first top-40 hit on the UK Singles Chart for Foxes, who later obtained top-20 and top-ten hits on the chart.

On the Mainstream Top 40 chart, which measured the popularity of songs on Top-40 radio stations, "Clarity" peaked at number two as part of Interscope's seven-week domination of the top-two of the chart; with Robin Thicke's "Blurred Lines" at number one for all of the weeks, "Clarity", Imagine Dragons' "Radioactive", and Maroon 5's "Love Somebody" was below it. Of 2013, "Clarity" was the fifth most listened-to song on Top 40 stations.

"Clarity" has received several gold and multi-platinum certifications across the world, including seven-times platinum for 7,000,000 units by the Recording Industry Association of America, platinum by the British Phonographic Industry for 600,000, and gold in Zedd's home country of Germany.

The song reached number two on the recently-introduced US Hot Dance/Electronic Songs chart. In particular on the Dance/Mix Show Airplay chart, it stalled at number-two for five weeks, below Krewella's "Alive" and Daft Punk's "Get Lucky". It was the most-played song in American nightclubs for the week of 23 February 2013, and the seventh-most played of 2013. It was the tenth best-selling dance/electronic song of the first half of 2013, having sold 945,000 units. The song ended up being the 31st-best performer on the Dance/Electronic chart of the 2010s.

=== Context ===
"Clarity"'s run on the US Hot 100 coincided with the introduction of various metrics to factor in streaming into the methodology, such as YouTube views. Several hits had their airplay and streaming metrics on-par with each other, especially songs by artists with strong star power such as Taylor Swift, Kendrick Lamar, and Ariana Grande. However, several hip-hop/R&B songs, such as "Power Trip" by J. Cole, "Bad" by Wale and "U.O.E.N.O." by Rocko, had their runs maintained by strong streaming with minimal play on top-40 radio. The inverse was the most true for pop and dance songs such as "Clarity", which was a top-ten airplay hit but only peaked at number 22 on streaming. 2013 also saw the sales of dance/electronic music towards songs more than albums; while the quantity of million-unit dance/electronic albums by the first half of the year was five less than that of 2012, the amount of million-unit songs of the period remained the same.

== Personnel ==
Adapted from the Clarity album liner notes.

- Songwriters – Anton Zaslavski, Matthew Koma, Porter Robinson, and Holly Hafermann
- Production and mixing – Zaslavski
- Background vocals – Zaslavski, Jesse Taub, RJ Colston, Kevin Feller, Priya Prins, Drew Ressler, Malachi Matt, and Robinson
- Vocal editing – Ryan Shanahan and Zaslavski
- Additional engineering – Taub
- Vocals – Louisa Rose Allen
- Vocal recording – Jonny Harris

== Charts ==
=== Weekly charts ===
Chart (2013–2014)	Peak position
Australia (ARIA)	13
Australia Dance (ARIA)	2
Australia Hitseekers (ARIA)	1
Belgium (Ultratop 50 Flanders)	38
Belgium Dance (Ultratop Flanders)	20
Belgium (Ultratip Bubbling Under Wallonia)	11
Belgium Dance (Ultratop Wallonia)	23
Brazil (Billboard Brasil Hot 100)	51
Brazil Hot Pop Songs	15
Canada Hot 100 (Billboard)	17
Canada CHR/Top 40 (Billboard)	1
Czech Republic Airplay (ČNS IFPI)	38
Germany (GfK)	94
Ireland (IRMA)	39
Italian Airplay (EarOne)	35
Netherlands (Single Top 100)	81
New Zealand (Recorded Music NZ)	13
Scottish Singles Sales (Official Charts)	22
Slovakia Airplay (ČNS IFPI)	66
UK Singles (Official Charts)	27
UK Dance (Official Charts)	6
US Billboard Hot 100	8
US Adult Pop Airplay (Billboard)	16
US Dance Club Songs (Billboard)	1
US Hot Dance/Electronic Songs (Billboard)	2
US Latin Pop Airplay (Billboard)	28
US Pop Airplay (Billboard)	2
US Rhythmic Airplay (Billboard)	7

=== Year-end charts ===
Chart (2013)	Position
Australia (ARIA)	57
Australia Dance (ARIA)	12
Canada (Canadian Hot 100)	49
UK Singles (OCC)	180
US Billboard Hot 100	24
US Dance Club Songs (Billboard)	7
US Hot Dance/Electronic Songs (Billboard)	5
US Mainstream Top 40 (Billboard)	5
US Rhythmic (Billboard)	41

Chart (2014)	Position
US Hot Dance/Electronic Songs (Billboard)	30

=== Decade-end charts ===
Chart (2010–2019)	Position
US Hot Dance/Electronic Songs (Billboard)	31

== Certifications ==
Region	Certification	Certified units/sales
Australia (ARIA)	6× Platinum	420,000^{‡}
Brazil (Pro-Música Brasil)	3× Platinum	180,000^{‡}
Canada (Music Canada)	Platinum	80,000^{*}
Denmark (IFPI Danmark)	Gold	45,000^{‡}
Germany (BVMI)	Gold	150,000^{‡}
Italy (FIMI)	Gold	15,000^{‡}
Mexico (AMPROFON)	Gold	30,000^{*}
New Zealand (RMNZ)	3× Platinum	90,000^{‡}
Sweden (GLF)	Platinum	40,000^{‡}
United Kingdom (BPI)	Platinum	600,000^{‡}
United States (RIAA)	7× Platinum	7,000,000^{‡}
^{*} Sales figures based on certification alone.^{‡} Sales+streaming figures based on certification alone.

== Release history ==
Country	Date	Format	Label
Italy	14 November 2012	Contemporary hit radio	Universal
Australia	1 February 2013	Digital download	Interscope
New Zealand	1 February 2013	Digital download	Interscope
United States	12 February 2013	Digital download (remixes EP)	Interscope
Australia	18 February 2013	Digital download (remixes EP)	Interscope
Germany	18 February 2013	Digital download (remixes EP)	Interscope
New Zealand	18 February 2013	Digital download (remixes EP)	Interscope
United States	5 March 2013	Contemporary hit radio	Interscope
United Kingdom	6 June 2014	Digital download (remixes EP)	Interscope

== See also ==
- List of number-one dance singles of 2013 (U.S.)
