= Let Go for Tonight =

Single by Foxes

from the album Glorious
- Released: 23 February 2014
- Recorded: 2013
- Genre: Dance-pop
- Length: 3:58
- Label: Sign of the Times
- Songwriters: Louisa Rose Allen; Tom Hull
- Producers: Mike Spencer; Kid Harpoon

Foxes singles chronology
"Youth" (2013)	"Let Go for Tonight" (2014)	"Holding onto Heaven" (2014)

Music video
- "Let Go for Tonight" on YouTube

"Let Go for Tonight" is a song by English singer and songwriter Foxes from her debut studio album, Glorious (2014). The song was released as a digital download in the United Kingdom on 23 February 2014 as the album's second single. It entered the UK Singles Chart at number 7, staying in the chart for 10 weeks.

== Background ==
"Let Go for Tonight" was originally supposed to be on Foxes's extended play Warrior (2012), but was later revamped for her debut studio album Glorious (2014).

== Music video ==
A music video to accompany the release of "Let Go for Tonight" was first released onto YouTube on 5 January 2014 at a total length of 3 minutes and 53 seconds. The music video starts out with Foxes and several other people sat in a white room at a white table. The song starts focusing on Foxes, and as the chorus swells, everyone begins throwing various food items and paint. This continues throughout the song, until the last bridge, in which Foxes runs out of the room (revealed to be a three-wall stand set up in a hilly field) and into a hilly field, followed by the others. Foxes ends the song being carried by a man. As of July 2025, the song had 28 million views on YouTube.

== Critical reception ==
Robert Copsey of Digital Spy gave the song a very positive review stating:

"The original version of Foxes' 'Let Go For Tonight' - which featured on her 'Warrior EP' back in the summer of 2012 - was, along with her previous offering 'Youth', a song that made us really fall for the singer. As such, our natural instinct was to fear the worst when it was announced that she would be releasing a spruced-up version of it as her latest single. But while the new version has undergone a considerable makeover - the stripped down, piano-led production has been given a boost with muscular beats and crashing drums - it has somehow managed to retain the naive and carefree essence of the original. "Let go for tonight baby, who needs sleep tonight?" she asks over twinkly synths and strings that take flight on the chorus; the result, an anthemic ode to all-nighters that deserves to rule the world."

== Track listing ==
Digital download - single
No.	Title	Length
1.	"Let Go for Tonight"	3:58

Digital download - EP
No.	Title	Length
1.	"Let Go for Tonight" (Kat Krazy Remix)	4:25
2.	"Let Go for Tonight" (High Contrast Remix)	4:54
3.	"Let Go for Tonight" (Fred Falke Remix)	6:58

== Chart performance ==
=== Weekly charts ===
Chart (2014)	Peak position
Australia (ARIA)	59
Belgium (Ultratip Bubbling Under Flanders)	25
Belgium Dance (Ultratop Flanders)	46
Euro Digital Song Sales (Billboard)	14
Ireland (IRMA)	6
Japan Hot 100 (Billboard)	12
Scotland Singles (OCC)	7
UK Singles (OCC)	7

== Certifications ==
Region	Certification	Certified units/sales
United Kingdom (BPI)	Silver	200,000^{‡}
^{‡} Sales+streaming figures based on certification alone.

== Release history ==
Region	Date	Format	Label	Ref.
United Kingdom	Sign of the Times	23 February 2014	Digital download	
