= Holding onto Heaven =

Single by Foxes

from the album Glorious
- Released: 4 May 2014
- Genre: Pop
- Length: 3:31
- Label: Sign of the Times
- Songwriter(s): Louisa Rose Allen; Toby Gad; Jonny Harris
- Producer(s): Mike Spencer

Foxes singles chronology
"Let Go for Tonight" (2014)	"Holding onto Heaven" (2014)	"Glorious" (2014)

Music video
- "Holding onto Heaven" on YouTube

"Holding onto Heaven" is a song by English singer and songwriter Foxes from her debut studio album Glorious (2014). The song was released as a digital download in the United Kingdom on 4 May 2014 as the album's third single.

== Background ==
Foxes announced that "Holding onto Heaven" would serve as the next single from her debut album, Glorious (2014). The track was made available for pre-order in advance of the release of Glorious, which was scheduled for release in the United Kingdom on 12 May 2014. Speaking to DIY about her debut, Foxes expressed a grounded perspective on releasing the album, stating that she was simply happy to share it and not placing too much pressure on its success.

== Composition ==
The track opens with delicate, soulful vocals reminiscent of Florence and the Machine, before shifting into a polished yet derivative pop sound. While pleasant and well-crafted, it has been noted to lack distinct originality.

== Music video ==
The video starts off with her playing with a music box. As she gets up from the table it is revealed there are two different versions of the same party: One of them being gloomy and slow and the other being uplifting and happy as everyone dances to the song. In the end it turns out to have all been an imagination, Foxes winding down the same music box from the beginning.

== Critical reception ==
Amy Davidson from Digital Spy praised "Holding onto Heaven" for its poetic lyricism and anthemic chorus, highlighting Foxes's powerful vocal performance and the track's elegant restraint despite its '80s ballad influences. The Guardian described the song as "rather lovely", noting Foxes's emotive, quivering vocals and her earnest delivery, which sets the track apart from typical talent show fare.

== Track listing ==
Digital Single
No.	Title	Length
1.	"Holding onto Heaven"	3:31

Remixes EP
No.	Title	Length
1.	"Holding onto Heaven" (Radio Edit)	3:19
2.	"Holding onto Heaven" (Chainsmokers Remix)	4:08
3.	"Holding onto Heaven" (Wideboys Remix)	6:53
4.	"Holding onto Heaven" (Kove Remix)	4:15
5.	"Let Go for Tonight" (BBC Radio 1 Live Lounge Version)	3:32

== Chart performance ==
=== Weekly charts ===
Chart (2014)	Peak position
Hungary (Rádiós Top 40)	26
Ireland (IRMA)	46
Scotland (OCC)	9
UK Singles (OCC)	14
US Dance Club Songs (Billboard)	10

== Release history ==
Region	Date	Format	Label
United Kingdom	4 May 2014	Digital download	Sign of the Times
