= Foxes (singer) =

English singer (born 1989)

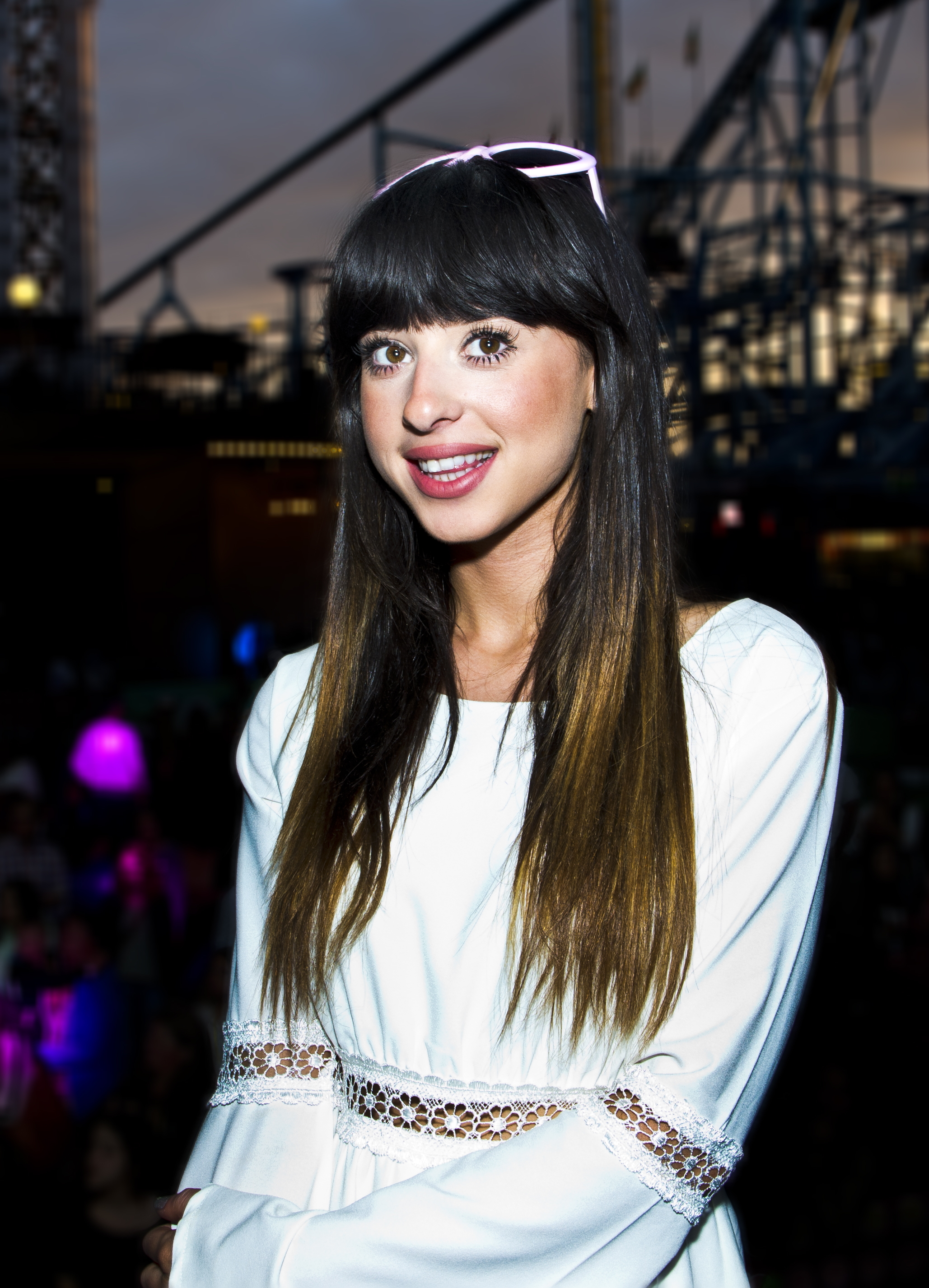
- Foxes at Sommarkrysset in 2014

Background information
- Also known as: Lou, Loui Rose
- Born: Louisa Rose Allen; 29 April 1989 (age 37); Southampton, Hampshire, England
- Genres: Pop; indie pop; electropop; metal rock; dance-pop; synth-pop
- Occupations: Singer; songwriter; guitarist; drummer
- Years active: 2011–present
- Labels: BMG; Epic; Neon Gold; RCA; Sign of the Times; Sony UK; PIAS
- Website: iamfoxes.com

Louisa Rose Allen (born 29 April 1989), known professionally as Foxes, is an English pop singer and rock drummer & guitarist. After her debut single, "Youth", was noticed by German DJ Zedd in 2012, she was featured on the song "Clarity", which peaked at number eight on the Billboard Hot 100 and won a Grammy Award for Best Dance Recording. She has since released three albums: Glorious (2014), All I Need (2016), The Kick (2022) as well as two EPs: Warrior (2012) and Friends in the Corner (2021). She has achieved commercial success with the singles "Youth", "Let Go for Tonight", "Holding onto Heaven", "Body Talk", and "Amazing".

== Early life and education ==
Allen was born on April 29, 1989, in Southampton, Hampshire. She grew up in the city's Swaythling and St Denys areas. She attended St Denys Primary School, Cantell School, and Eastleigh College. She began to write music when she was 14 years old and was a finalist in a local talent competition in 2009. At 18 years old she considered training as a beauty therapist, however her sister persuaded her to move to London to pursue her singing ambitions. She attended the Institute of Contemporary Music Performance but dropped out, preferring to write and perform music than study it.

== Career ==
=== 2011–2014: Warrior and Glorious ===
Allen devised a stage name to differentiate herself from British pop singer Lily Allen. She considered the alias Foxes after a suggestion from a friend, the first song she had written being titled "Like Foxes Do"; her mother then told her that she had a dream the previous night "about these foxes running up our street and they were howling and making these beautiful noises", which she said reminded her of her daughter's music. Allen chose Foxes based on this connection. She began performing gigs as Foxes in London in 2011.

Foxes released her debut single, "Youth", in January 2012 on Neon Gold Records, and the following month was signed to Sign of the Times, a Simon Fuller-owned UK imprint of Sony Music Entertainment. "Youth" and its B-side, "Home", were featured in the American television series Gossip Girl and an EP, Warrior (produced by Samuel Dixon, also known as Sam Kennedy, and later Maddox Dixon), followed in July 2012, which Foxes promoted with a US tour. Paste magazine described Warrior as "a beautifully ethereal EP that warrants all sorts of comparisons, but equally manages to stand on its own two feet", while PopMatters wrote that it was "a powerful, well-rounded set" and Consequence of Sound introduced the singer as "[i]f Florence Welch and Katy Perry had a beautiful, brunette love child". Later in 2012, Foxes toured with Marina and the Diamonds on her Lonely Hearts Club Tour and released a second single, "Echo".

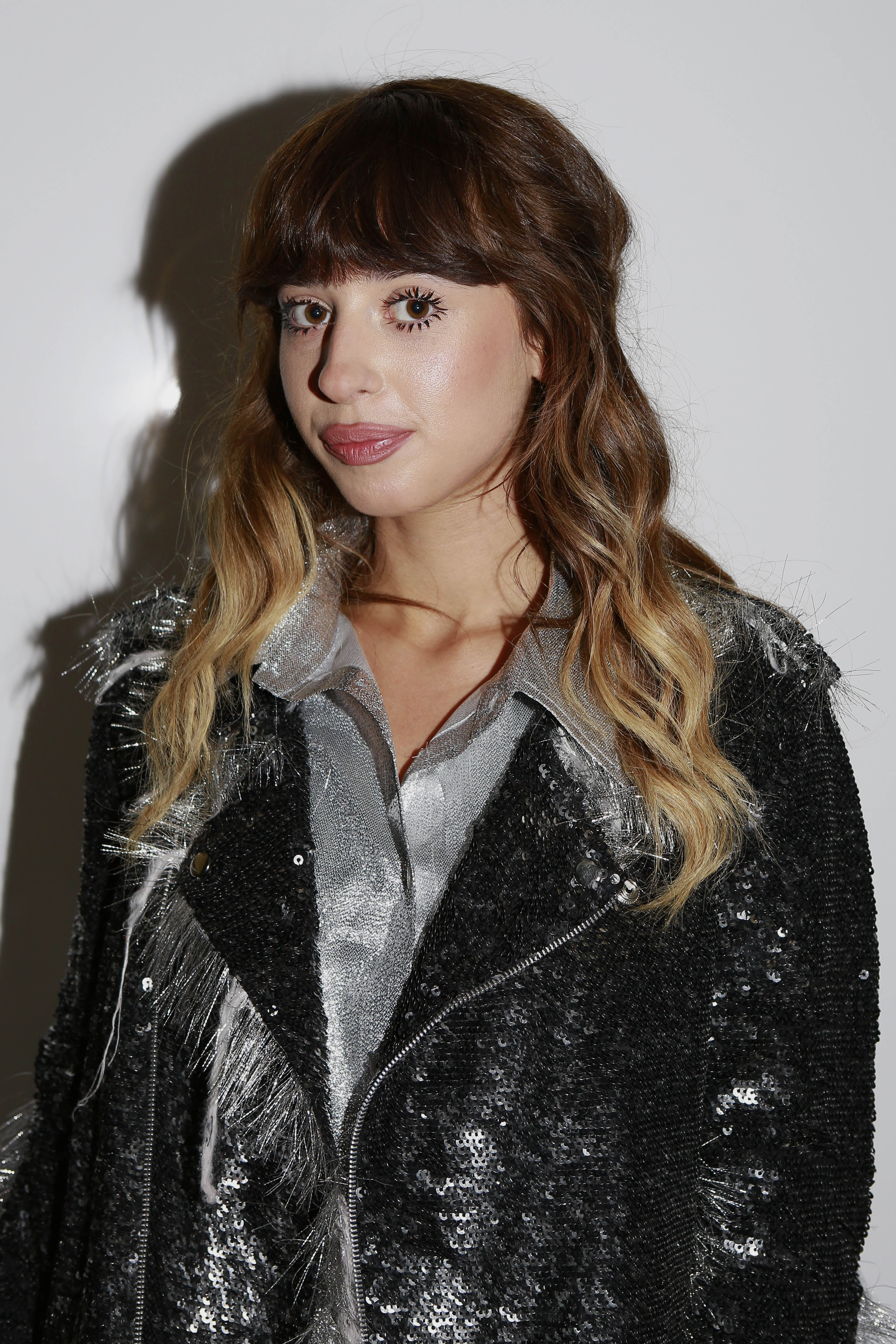
Foxes in 2016

"Youth" caught the attention of dance producer Zedd, who invited Foxes to feature on his song "Clarity". "Clarity" was released as a single in late 2012 and became a major hit during 2013, reaching number eight on the US Billboard Hot 100 and number one on the Hot Dance Club Songs. The song was certified double platinum in Australia, platinum in the United States, and gold in the United Kingdom, where it reached number 27 on the UK Singles Chart. At the 56th Annual Grammy Awards, Zedd and Foxes won the award for Best Dance Recording. Also in 2013, Foxes was featured on Fall Out Boy's song "Just One Yesterday" from their album Save Rock and Roll, on the Rudimental single "Right Here" (a top 20 hit in the United Kingdom) and on the Sub Focus track "Until the End", from his album Torus.

Foxes' "teaser" single "Beauty Queen" was released in May 2013, followed by a US re-release of "Youth" in August 2013 after Foxes signed to RCA Records in the country. In the United Kingdom, "Youth" reached number 12 on the singles chart in October 2013, concurrent to the song's use in a high profile advertising campaign for retailer Debenhams. During late 2013, Foxes embarked on a headline tour of the United Kingdom. A newly recorded version of "Let Go for Tonight", a track previously featured on the Warrior EP, was released as a single in February 2014, charting in the United Kingdom at number seven—Foxes' first top ten hit.

On 17 April 2014, Foxes appeared on BBC Radio 1's Innuendo Bingo. Foxes' debut album, Glorious, was released in May 2014 following the single "Holding onto Heaven" (number 14), and debuted at number five on the UK Albums Chart. A fourth single, "Glorious", followed in August 2014 and was used in an ITV advertising campaign promoting the network's autumn season of programmes. During September and October 2014, Foxes served as the opening act for R&B musician Pharrell's Dear Girl Tour, playing to arenas across Europe. Pharrell personally offered a support slot to Foxes after hearing her cover of his hit single "Happy" for Radio 1's Live Lounge; Foxes later accused producers of the televised singing competition The X Factor for copying her arrangement of "Happy" for a performance of the song by contestant Lauren Platt, as both versions interpolated the Massive Attack song "Teardrop". Also in October, Foxes was featured in the eighth series of the BBC science fiction series Doctor Who, performing Queen's "Don't Stop Me Now" in the episode "Mummy on the Orient Express". In December, Foxes toured the United Kingdom once again as a headliner.

=== 2015–2019: All I Need and four-year hiatus ===
Foxes stated in a late 2014 interview that she had commenced work on her second album. She also collaborated with veteran dance producer Giorgio Moroder on his 2015 solo album, Déjà Vu, featuring on the track "Wildstar". In subsequent interviews, Foxes announced that the album was titled All I Need and she hoped to release it in late 2015. Recording sessions took place in America, Sweden, and the United Kingdom.

All I Need was released on 5 February 2016. The album's first single, "Body Talk", was released in July 2015 and reached number 25 on the UK Singles Chart. Foxes debuted the track during a one-day tour of seven UK cities that earned her an entry to the Guinness World Records for the title of "most live concerts in 12 hours in multiple cities". The album's track listing and the video for the song "Feet Don't Fail Me Now" were also released in July. The second single, "Better Love", was released in September 2015. After that Foxes embarked on a headline UK tour, supported by Izzy Bizu. The third single "Amazing" was released on 4 December 2015. "Amazing" was used by ITV in an advertisement to promote their Christmas programming. Foxes featured on Kygo's track "Oasis" from his album Cloud Nine, which was released on 13 May 2016. "Cruel" was released as the fourth single from All I Need on 19 April 2016 with an accompanying music video released on the same date. In the same month, Foxes was announced to be one of the supporting acts of British alternative rock band Coldplay in the European and North American legs of their A Head Full of Dreams Tour, alongside Alessia Cara.

In March 2017, ITV used Foxes' song "Scar" to promote Grantchester's third series. She performed at the Indonesian Television Awards on 20 September 2017, performing songs including "Better Love", "Let Go For Tonight", and "Clarity". In February 2018, Foxes teased of new music saying, "Thank you for your patience with this next record... I will be releasing new music this year and I can't wait to share it with you".

=== 2020–present: Friends in the Corner EP and The Kick ===
On 15 May 2020, Foxes teased new music on her social media platforms by sharing three videos, one each day, which consisted of her asking a question. The videos were accompanied by a phone number one could ring to answer the question. The lead single from her upcoming project, "Love Not Loving You", was released on 20 May 2020, marking her first song release in four years. On the same day, it was revealed that Foxes had signed a new record deal with PIAS Recordings; it made the single her first release on the label. On 29 July 2020, the second single, "Woman", was released. It was followed by the third and fourth singles, "Friends in the Corner" and "Hollywood" which were released on 2 September 2020 and 4 December 2020 respectively. The latter was described as a "cathartic experience" by Clash magazine.

On 17 March 2021, Foxes released the single "Kathleen" and announced the release of her second EP, Friends in the Corner, which would include all previously released singles and an additional two new songs. The EP was released on 1 April 2021.

Her third studio album, The Kick, was released on 11 February 2022, which included the single "Sister Ray", released in September 2021.

== Artistry ==
=== Fashion ===
In 2013, Foxes appeared in an advertising campaign promoting retailer Debenhams's autumn/winter collection. She compiled a playlist to accompany the London Fashion Week premiere of Markus Lupfer's autumn/winter collection in 2014, and later in the year advertised Adidas's Energy Boost line of running shoes. For stage outfits on her 2014 tours, Foxes collaborated with fashion brand River Island citing Björk and Patti Smith as inspirations. She fronted the 2015 poster campaign for Fashion Targets Breast Cancer alongside Abbey Clancy, Alice Dellal and Lily Donaldson, and the same year became the face of fashion retailer H&M's H&M Loves Music collection.

Foxes has said that her fashion sense has been influenced by fellow singer Cyndi Lauper and characters in films such as Empire Records (1995) and Romy and Michele's High School Reunion (1997), as well as by grunge fashions and Japanese street fashion. In 2014, ASOS.com declared Foxes "a total fashun [sic] muse" and praised her bangs as "great for hairspiration", while Elle referred to the singer as a "fashion maven" and invited her to perform for their ELLE Sessions series. Foxes is signed to the modelling agency Premier Models, has appeared in shoots for Vogue and Nylon magazines, and has been dressed for various red carpet events by Mark Fast, Markus Lupfer, and Miu Miu.

== Discography ==
Studio albums

- Glorious (2014)
- All I Need (2016)
- The Kick (2022)

== Tours ==
=== Headlining ===
- Glorious Tour (2014)
- All I Need Tour (2015)
- The Kick Tour (2022)

=== Supporting act ===
- The Lonely Hearts Club Tour (2012)
- Dear Girl Tour (2014)
- A Head Full of Dreams Tour (2016)

== Awards and nominations ==
Year	Ceremony	Category	Result	Ref.
2013	2013 Video Music Awards	Artist to Watch – "Clarity" (with Zedd)	Nominated	
2014	56th Grammy Awards	Best Dance Recording – "Clarity" (with Zedd)	Won	
2014	2014 Billboard Music Awards	Top Dance/Electronic Song – "Clarity" (with Zedd)	Nominated	
2014	2014 Radio Disney Music Awards	Best Musical Collaboration – "Clarity" (with Zedd)	Nominated	
2014	2014 iHeartRadio Music Awards	EDM Song of the Year – "Clarity" (with Zedd)	Nominated	
2014	2014 ASCAP Pop Awards	Most Performed Song – "Clarity" (with Zedd)	Won	
2014	2014 International Dance Music Awards	Best Electro/Progressive House Track – "Clarity" (with Zedd)	Nominated	
2014	2014 International Dance Music Awards	Best Commercial/Pop Dance Track – "Clarity" (with Zedd)	Nominated	
2014	2014 International Dance Music Awards	Best Featured Vocalist Performance – "Clarity" (with Zedd)	Nominated	
2014	2014 World Music Awards	World's Best Song – "Clarity" (with Zedd)	Nominated	
2014	2014 World Music Awards	World's Best Song – "Youth" – Herself	Nominated	
2014	2014 World Music Awards	World's Best Video – "Clarity" (with Zedd)	Nominated	
2014	2014 World Music Awards	World’s Best Female Artist – Herself	Nominated	
2014	2014 World Music Awards	World’s Best Entertainer of the Year – Herself	Nominated	
2014	2014 World Music Awards	World’s Best Live Act – Herself	Nominated	
2014	Glamour Awards	NEXT Breakthrough – Herself	Nominated	
2015	Popjustice £20 Music Prize	Best British Pop Single - "Body Talk"	Nominated	
2016	Glamour Awards	Cointreau British Solo Artist	Nominated	
2022	Best Art Vinyl	Best Vinyl Art - The Kick	Nominated	
