= Matthew Koma =

American songwriter and musician (born 1987)

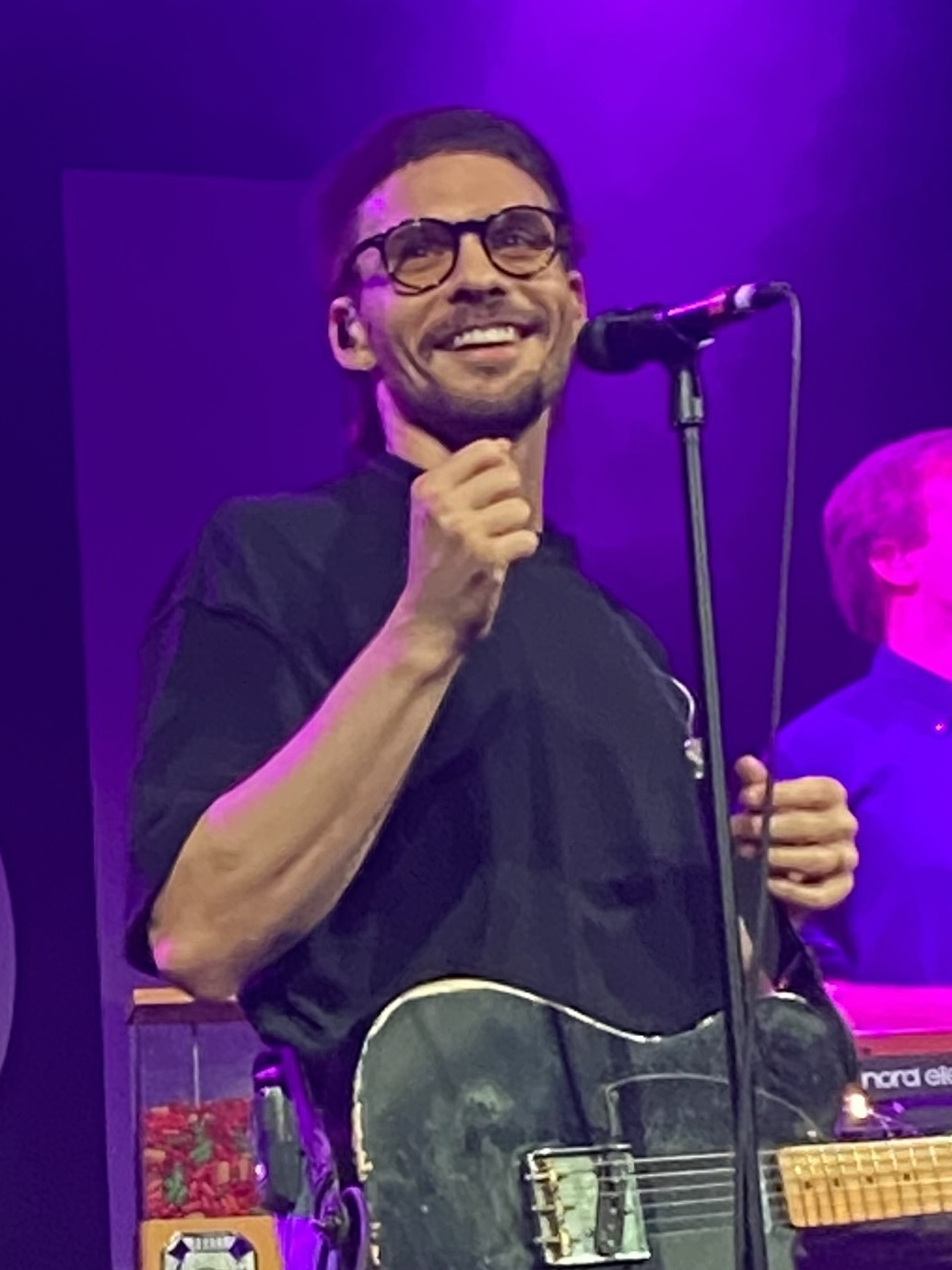
- Koma in 2024

Background information
- Born: Matthew Fredrick Bair; June 2, 1987 (age 39); Brooklyn, New York, U.S.
- Genres: Pop; punk rock; EDM; hip hop
- Occupations: Singer; songwriter; DJ; record producer
- Instruments: Vocals; guitar; keyboards
- Years active: 2002–present
- Labels: Cherrytree; Interscope; RCA
- Spouse: Hilary Duff (m. 2019)
- Website: wbleague.com

Matthew Fredrick Bair (born June 2, 1987), known professionally as Matthew Koma, is an American singer, songwriter, DJ, and record producer. Songs written or co-written by Koma include "Spectrum", "Find You", and Grammy Award–winner "Clarity", all produced by Zedd (Koma provided vocals on "Spectrum" and "Find You"). He has collaborated with artists such as Shania Twain, Britney Spears, Hilary Duff, Hardwell, Zedd, Miriam Bryant, Sebastian Ingrosso, Alesso, Afrojack, Tiësto, Vicetone, Ryan Tedder of OneRepublic, and among others.

== Early life ==
Matthew Fredrick Bair was born in Brooklyn and raised in Seaford, Long Island, on June 2, 1987, to his parents, Rhonda and Gerald D. Bair. His father, Gerald, is a singer and songwriter. His mother, Rhonda, is a vocal supporter of his music career since his early days. His parents have publicly shared how incredibly proud they are of their son's musical success.

Koma first performed on the stage with his father when he was four years old. Koma wrote his first song when he was nine years old and credits Elvis Costello and Bruce Springsteen for his inspiration at a young age. Koma attended Seaford High School.

== Musical career ==
Koma signed to record on Jimmy Iovine's Interscope Records in June 2011, after Iovine watched an acoustic performance of the record "She". In May 2012, Koma released his first EP, Parachute, in which he wrote, produced and co-produced all four tracks with collaborators Twice as Nice, Alex da Kid, Sam Watters, Louis Biancaniello, and Ari Levine. Koma provided the main vocals for the 2012 song "End of Pretend" by Black Cards, and he co-produced a remix of the Bruce Springsteen song "Rocky Ground" with Ron Aniello, which Springsteen released on his album Wrecking Ball.

In 2012, Koma joined the Sorry for Party Rocking Tour with LMFAO and Far East Movement, He later toured with Owl City.

In 2013, Koma toured Europe supporting Ellie Goulding alongside Charli XCX., and he released the single "Dare You" with DJ Hardwell.

In March 2014, Showtek's "Cannonball (Earthquake)", featuring Koma, was released. Also in 2014, Koma appeared on RAC's debut album, featuring on the single "Cheap Sunglasses, and was featured on Audien's single "Serotonin". Afrojack's 2014 album Forget the World featured two songs written and sung by Koma, "Keep our Love Alive" and "Illuminate".

In January 2015, Koma was featured in Kia Motors' online video series Rediscovered, where he recorded a cover of The Miracles' "The Tracks of My Tears" before Smokey Robinson made a surprise visit in the studio. Koma collaborated with The Knocks on "I Wish (My Taylor Swift)", which was released as a single in September 2015 and later appeared on the Knocks' 2016 album, 55.

In 2016, he worked with Britney Spears on her album Glory producing the song “Swimming in the Stars”, which was released in 2020.

In 2017, Koma produced several tracks for Shania Twain's fifth studio album Now, including the lead single "Life's About to Get Good". He also appeared on the 2017 Downes Braide Association album Skyscraper Souls.

In 2018, Koma premiered "On the 5", both single and video under his new project, Winnetka Bowling League via RCA Records.

In August 2020, he co-wrote and co-produced the single "Change Your Mind" by Keith Urban.

He produced and co-wrote his wife's album Luck... or Something by Hilary Duff, in which started with the single "Mature" in late 2025 and was released early 2026.

== Personal life ==
Koma dated Carly Rae Jepsen from 2012 until 2013, after they met while working on her album Kiss.

On May 9, 2019, Koma became engaged to his then-girlfriend of two years, Hilary Duff, and then, they were married on December 21, 2019, at their home in Los Angeles. They have three daughters. He is also a stepfather to Duff's son from her previous marriage to ice hockey player Mike Comrie.

In May 2017, he released "Dear Ana", a song about his anorexia and confessed that the disease almost killed him.

== Awards and nominations ==
Award	Year	Category	Nominee(s)	Result	Ref.
BMI Pop Awards	2014	Award-Winning Song	"Clarity"	Won	
Billboard Music Awards	2012	Top Dance/Club Song	"Spectrum"	Won	
International Dance Music Awards	2013	Best Progressive Track	"Years"	Nominated	
International Dance Music Awards	2016	Best Dubstep/Drum & Bass Track	"Emotional"	Nominated	
MTV Video Music Awards Japan	2012	Best Dance Video	"Spectrum"	Nominated	
