= Hilary Duff discography =

Cataloguing of published recordings by Hilary Duff

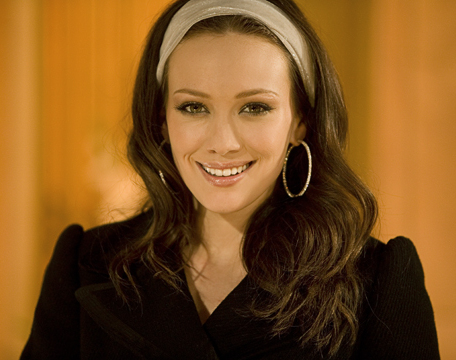
- Duff in April 2007
- Studio albums: 6
- Extended plays: 4
- Live albums: 1
- Compilation albums: 4
- Singles: 22
- Video albums: 5
- Music videos: 22
- Promotional singles: 3

American actress and singer Hilary Duff has released six studio albums, four extended plays (EPs), one live album, four compilation albums, five video albums, 22 singles, three promotional singles, and 16 music videos. According to Recording Industry Association of America (RIAA), Duff has sold 3 million digital singles and 7 million albums in the United States.

Duff released her debut album Santa Claus Lane through Buena Vista Records in October 2002. The album peaked at numbers 95, 134, and 154 respectively in Canada, Japan, and the United States, and was certified Gold by the RIAA. Its title track and "Tell Me a Story" were released as singles.

In 2003, her second album Metamorphosis was released by Buena Vista and Hollywood Records, and topped the American and Canadian charts, selling five million copies worldwide. It spawned the singles "So Yesterday" and "Come Clean", which reached the top 10 within Canada and the Netherlands. Metamorphosis was the most successful release for Hollywood Records at that time. Duff's third album, Hilary Duff, was released in 2004 and peaked at the second position on the US Billboard 200 while topping the Canadian Albums Chart. This album spawned the single "Fly" and "Someone's Watching Over Me", which both peaked within the top 30 in Australia. In 2005, she released her first compilation album, Most Wanted, which became her first album to debut at number 1 on the Billboard 200. The album spawned the singles "Wake Up" and "Beat of My Heart", which both peaked in the top ten in Italy. The following year, Duff released 4ever Hilary Duff, an Italy-exclusive compilation.

Her fourth studio album, Dignity, was released in 2007 and reached the top ten in the US, Canada, and Italy. The lead single "Play with Fire" failed to make an impact on national charts, though it did begin a string of American club hits for Duff, peaking at the 31st position on Billboard's Hot Dance Club Songs chart. Its second single "With Love" became her highest-peaking single on the Billboard Hot 100, hitting number 24, while also reaching number 1 on the club charts along with the album's final single "Stranger". The latter two also charted within the top ten in Italy and top 20 in Spain. She scored her third consecutive number 1 club hit with "Reach Out", the lead single from her greatest hits release Best of Hilary Duff (2008). The album peaked at number 125 on the Billboard 200.

On June 12, 2015, Duff released her fifth studio album Breathe In. Breathe Out., which charted in the top five in the US, Canada, and Australia. It spawned three singles: "Chasing the Sun", "All About You", and "Sparks". "Chasing the Sun" was the highest peaking single from the album on the Billboard Hot 100 at number 79, whereas the second single "All About You" reached the top 20 in Australia and was certified Gold by the Australian Recording Industry Association (ARIA). "Sparks" continued Duff's streak of top ten entries on the US dance charts where it peaked at number 6 and was certified Gold in Mexico. As of July 2014, Duff has sold over 15 million records worldwide.

Her sixth album, Luck... or Something, followed in February 2026 and topped the album charts in Australia and Canada. It contains the singles "Mature", "Roommates", and "Weather for Tennis". On October 23, 2026 Duff released the EP Holiday Things, her first Christmas-themed studio release in 24 years.

== Albums ==
=== Studio albums ===
List of studio albums, with selected chart positions, sales, and certifications
Title	Album details	Peak chart positions										Sales	Certifications
Title	Album details	US	AUS	CAN	IRL	ITA	JPN	NLD	NZ	SWI	UK	Sales	Certifications
Santa Claus Lane	Released: October 15, 2002; Label: Buena Vista; Formats: Cassette, CD, LP, digital download, streaming	154	—	95	—	—	134	—	—	—	—	US: 477,000	RIAA: Gold
Metamorphosis	Released: August 26, 2003; Label: Buena Vista, Hollywood; Formats: Cassette, CD, CD/DVD, LP, digital download, streaming	1	19	1	41	—	9	23	20	—	69	US: 3,961,000; WW: 5,000,000	RIAA: 4× Platinum; ARIA: Platinum; MC: 4× Platinum; RIAJ: Gold
Hilary Duff	Released: September 15, 2004; Label: Hollywood; Formats: Cassette, CD, LP, digital download, streaming	2	6	1	—	—	5	19	14	—	—	US: 1,799,000	RIAA: Platinum; ARIA: Platinum; MC: 3× Platinum; RIAJ: Gold; RMNZ: Gold
Dignity	Released: March 21, 2007; Label: Hollywood; Formats: Cassette, CD, CD/DVD, LP, digital download, streaming	3	17	3	10	8	12	—	31	64	25	US: 411,000	RIAA: Gold; FIMI: Gold; IRMA: Gold
Breathe In. Breathe Out.	Released: June 12, 2015; Label: RCA; Formats: CD, LP, digital download, streaming	5	4	5	77	78	190	—	29	—	91	US: 33,000; CAN: 4,700	
Luck... or Something	Released: February 20, 2026; Label: Atlantic; Formats: Cassette, CD, digital download, LP, streaming	3	1	1	7	46	—	11	2	74	5	US: 73,000	MC: Gold
"—" denotes releases that did not chart in that territory.

=== Compilation albums ===
List of compilation albums, with selected chart positions, sales, and certifications
Title	Album details	Peak chart positions										Sales	Certifications
Title	Album details	US	AUS	CAN	IRL	ITA	JPN	NLD	NZ	SWI	UK	Sales	Certifications
Most Wanted	Released: August 10, 2005; Label: Hollywood; Formats: Cassette, CD, CD/DVD, LP, digital download, streaming	1	3	1	8	6	3	51	10	69	31	US: 1,489,000	RIAA: Platinum; ARIA: Platinum; BPI: Gold; IRMA: Gold; MC: 2× Platinum; RIAJ: Gold; RMNZ: Gold
4Ever Hilary Duff	Released: May 12, 2006; Label: EMI; Formats: CD, digital download, streaming	—	—	—	—	12	—	—	—	—	—		
Best of Hilary Duff	Released: November 11, 2008; Label: Hollywood; Formats: CD, LP, digital download, streaming	125	—	86	86	41	32	—	—	—	144		
Metamorphosis / Hilary Duff / Dignity	Released: August 26, 2009; Label: Hollywood; Formats: Digital download	—	—	—	—	—	—	—	—	—	—		
"—" denotes releases that did not chart in that territory.

=== Live albums ===
List of live albums, with selected chart positions
Title	Album details
Live at Gibson Amphitheatre: August 15, 2007	Released: November 23, 2009; Label: Hollywood; Format: Digital download

=== Video albums ===
List of albums with selected chart positions and certifications
Title	Album details	Peak chart positions	Certifications
Title	Album details	JPN	Certifications
All Access Pass	Released: November 4, 2003; Label: Buena Vista, Hollywood; Format: DVD	—	RIAA: 2× Platinum; MC: 5× Platinum; ARIA: Platinum
The Girl Can Rock	Released: August 10, 2004; Label: Hollywood; Formats: DVD, DVD + CD	78	MC: 5× Platinum; ARIA: Platinum
Learning to Fly	Released: November 16, 2004; Label: Hollywood; Format: DVD	—	ARIA: Gold
4Ever Hilary	Released: August 14, 2006; Label: Virgin; Format: DVD	—	
Here and Now	Released: December 18, 2007; Label: Hollywood; Format: Digital download	—	
"—" denotes releases that did not chart in that territory.

== Extended plays ==
List of extended plays
Title	Details	Peak chart positions		
Title	Details	US Sales	UK Sales	SCO
Metamorphosis Remixes	Released: November 18, 2003; Label: Buena Vista, Hollywood; Formats: CD	—	—	—
Dignity Remix EP	Released: April 3, 2007; Label: Hollywood; Formats: CD	—	—	—
(Mine)	Released: April 18, 2026; Label: Atlantic; Formats: LP, digital download, streaming	17	28	29
Holiday Things	Released: October 23, 2026; Label: Atlantic; Formats: LP, CD, digital download, streaming			

== Singles ==
List of singles as lead artist, with selected chart positions, sales, and certifications
Title	Year	Peak chart positions										Sales (Note: This list only includes digital sales.)	Certifications	Album
Title	Year	US	AUS	CAN	IRL	ITA	NLD	NZ	SPA	SWI	UK	Sales	Certifications	Album
"I Can't Wait"	2002	—	—	—	—	—	—	—	—	—	—			Lizzie McGuire
"Santa Claus Lane"	2002	—	—	—	—	—	—	—	—	—	—			Santa Claus Lane
"Tell Me a Story" (featuring Lil' Romeo)	2002	—	—	—	—	—	—	—	—	—	—			Santa Claus Lane
"Why Not"	2003	—	14	—	—	—	22	15	—	—	—	US: 124,000		The Lizzie McGuire Movie / Metamorphosis
"So Yesterday"	2003	42	8	2	6	—	4	23	17	28	9	US: 252,000	RIAA: Gold; ARIA: Platinum	Metamorphosis
"Come Clean"	2004	35	17	7	16	—	9	17	12	78	18	US: 655,000	RIAA: Platinum	Metamorphosis
"Little Voice"	2004	—	29	29	—	—	80	—	—	—	—			Metamorphosis
"Our Lips Are Sealed" (with Haylie Duff)	2004	—	8	47	—	—	—	—	—	—	168	US: 161,000		A Cinderella Story
"Fly"	2004	— (Note: "Fly" did not enter the Billboard Hot 100, but peaked at number 29 on the Mainstream Top 40 chart.)	21	—	10	13	32	24	—	—	20	US: 284,000		Hilary Duff
"Someone's Watching Over Me"	2005	—	22	—	—	—	—	—	—	—	—	US: 238,000		Hilary Duff
"Wake Up"	2005	29	15	—	5	2	31	24	9	31	7	US: 437,000	RIAA: Gold	Most Wanted
"Beat of My Heart"	2005	—	13	—	—	8	—	—	17	89	—			Most Wanted
"Play with Fire"	2006	— (Note: "Play with Fire" did not enter the Billboard Hot 100, but peaked at number 31 on the Hot Dance Club Songs chart.)	—	—	—	—	—	—	—	—	—	US: 112,000		Dignity
"With Love"	2007	24	22	16	26	8	91	27	6	—	29	US: 550,000	RIAA: Gold	Dignity
"Stranger"	2007	97	49	86	—	6	—	—	14	—	196	US: 253,000		Dignity
"Reach Out"	2008	— (Note: "Reach Out" did not enter the Billboard Hot 100, but peaked at number one on the Hot Dance Club Songs chart.)	51	—	—	3	—	—	—	—	193			Best of Hilary Duff
"Any Other Day"	2009	—	—	—	—	—	—	—	—	—	—			What Goes Up
"Chasing the Sun" (Note: "Chasing the Sun" appears on the deluxe version of Breathe In. Breathe Out. on streaming services.)	2014	79	72	59	—	—	—	—	46	—	—			Breathe In. Breathe Out.
"All About You" (Note: "All About You" appears on the deluxe version of Breathe In. Breathe Out. on streaming services.)	2014	— (Note: "All About You" did not enter the Billboard Hot 100, but peaked at number 19 on the Bubbling Under Hot 100 Singles chart.)	20	91	—	—	—	—	—	—	—		ARIA: Gold	Breathe In. Breathe Out.
"Sparks"	2015	93	104	63	—	—	—	—	—	—	—			Breathe In. Breathe Out.
"Little Lies"	2016	—	—	—	—	—	—	—	—	—	—			Younger
"Never Let You Go" (RAC featuring Matthew Koma and Hilary Duff)	2020	—	—	—	—	—	—	—	—	—	195			Non-album single
"Mature"	2025	— (Note: "Mature" did not enter the Billboard Hot 100, but reached number 4 on the Bubbling Under Hot 100 chart.)	—	57	—	—	—	— (Note: "Mature" did not enter the NZ Top 40 Singles Chart, but reached number 15 on the NZ Hot Singles Chart.)	—	—	— (Note: "Mature" did not enter the UK Singles Chart, but peaked at number 34 on the UK Singles Downloads Chart.)			Luck... or Something
"Roommates"	2026	—	—	—	—	—	—	— (Note: "Roommates" did not enter the NZ Top 40 Singles Chart, but reached number 15 on the NZ Hot Singles Chart.)	—	—	— (Note: "Roommates" did not enter the UK Singles Chart, but peaked at number 50 on the UK Singles Downloads Chart.)			Luck... or Something
"Weather for Tennis"	2026	—	—	—	—	—	—	— (Note: "Weather for Tennis" did not enter the NZ Top 40 Singles Chart, but reached number 21 on the NZ Hot Singles Chart.)	—	—	—			Luck... or Something
"What Dreams Are Made Of (Mine)"	2026	—	—	—	—	—	—	—	—	—	—			Mine
"—" denotes releases that did not chart in that territory.

=== Promotional singles ===
Title	Year	Album
"Supergirl"	2006	Most Wanted: The Collector's Signature Edition
"Catastrophe"	2026	The Cat in the Hat

== Other charted songs ==
List of other charted songs, with selected chart positions
Title	Year	Peak chart positions	Album
Title	Year	NZ Hot	Album
"We Don't Talk"	2026	27	Luck... or Something
"Future Tripping"	2026	33	Luck... or Something

== Other album appearances ==
List of other album appearances
Title	Year	Album
"The Tiki, Tiki, Tiki Room"	2002	Disneymania
"What Dreams Are Made Of"	2003	The Lizzie McGuire Movie
"The Siamese Cat Song" (with Haylie Duff)	2004	Disneymania 2
"Circle of Life" (among Disney Channel Stars)	2004	Disneymania 2
"Crash World"	2004	A Cinderella Story
"Now You Know"	2004	A Cinderella Story
"(I'll Give) Anything But Up!"	2004	Thanks and Giving All Year Long
"Material Girl" (with Haylie Duff)	2006	Girl Next
"Any Other Day"	2009	What Goes Up (Original Motion Picture Soundtrack)
"Youngblood" (with Aubrey Peeples and Stefanie Scott)	2015	Jem and the Holograms
"9 to 5" (with Younger cast)	2021	Younger

== Music videos ==
List of music videos, with director
Title	Year	Director
"I Can't Wait"	2002	—N/a
"Tell Me a Story" (featuring Lil' Romeo)	2002	—N/a
"Why Not"	2003	Elliott Lester
"So Yesterday"	2003	Chris Applebaum
"Circle of Life" (among Disney Channel Circle of Stars)	2004	—N/a
"Come Clean"	2004	Dave Meyers
"Little Voice" (Live)	2004	Anna Boiardi
"Our Lips Are Sealed" (with Haylie Duff)	2004	Chris Applebaum
"So Yesterday" (Live)	2004	Anna Boiardi
"Fly"	2004	Chris Applebaum
"Wake Up"	2005	Marc Webb
"Beat of My Heart"	2005	Phil Harder
"Play with Fire"	2006	Alex and Martin
"With Love"	2007	Matthew Rolston
"Stranger"	2007	Fatima Robinson
"Reach Out"	2008	Philip Andelman
"Chasing the Sun"	2014	Declan Whitebloom
"All About You"	2014	Declan Whitebloom
"Sparks"	2015	Hannah Lux Davis
"Sparks" (Fan-Demanded Version)	2015	Hannah Lux Davis
"My Kind"	2015	—N/a
"Mature"	2025	Lauren Dunn
"Roommates"	2026	Matty Peacock
"Weather for Tennis"	2026	Alfred Marroquin
"What Dreams Are Made Of (Mine)"	2026	—N/a
"Catastrophe"	2026	Dano Cerny
