= List of Hilary Duff concert tours =

The following is a list of concert tours that American actress and singer Hilary Duff has embarked on during her professional career.

== Metamorphosis Tour ==
Metamorphosis Tour
- Continental tour by Hilary Duff
- Promotional poster for the tour
- Location: North America
- Associated album: Metamorphosis
- Start date: November 17, 2003
- End date: May 16, 2004
- Legs: 4
- No. of shows: 32

Hilary Duff concert chronology
- Metamorphosis Tour (2003–2004); Most Wanted Tour (2004–2005)

The Metamorphosis Tour is the debut concert tour by the American pop singer Hilary Duff. The tour supported Duff's second studio album Metamorphosis. The concert at the Ventura Theatre was filmed and released on Hilary Duff: The Concert – The Girl Can Rock.

=== Set list ===
1. "Girl Can Rock"
2. "Little Voice"
3. "Come Clean"
4. "So Yesterday"
5. "Anywhere But Here"
6. "Metamorphosis"
7. "Sweet Sixteen"
8. "Where Did I Go Right"
9. "Love Just Is"
10. "Why Not"
11. "The Math"
12. "Workin' It Out"
13. "Party Up"

Encore

14. "My Generation"

=== Tour dates ===
List of concerts
Date	City	Country	Venue
November 17, 2003	Phoenix	United States	Celebrity Theatre
November 19, 2003	Santa Cruz	United States	The Catalyst
November 20, 2003	Petaluma	United States	Phoenix Theatre
November 21, 2003	Ventura	United States	Ventura Theatre
November 28, 2003	Reading	United States	Sovereign Performing Arts Center
November 29, 2003	Wilkes-Barre	United States	F.M. Kirby Center
November 30, 2003	Norfolk	United States	The NorVa
December 1, 2003	Tampa	United States	Tampa P.A.C.
December 2, 2003 (Note: Mix 93.3 Jingle Jam)	Kansas City	United States	Uptown Theatre
December 3, 2003 (Note: 106.1 Kiss FM Kissmas Jingle Ball)	Grand Prairie	United States	Next Stage at Grand Prairie
December 4, 2003 (Note: KRBE 104 Jingle Jam)	Houston	United States	Reliant Arena
December 5, 2003 (Note: KIIS FM Jingle Ball)	Los Angeles	United States	Staples Center
December 6, 2003 (Note: 95.7 KISSmas Snow Ball)	Denver	United States	Fillmore Auditorium
December 8, 2003 (Note: KDWB Jingle Ball)	Minneapolis	United States	Target Center
December 11, 2003 (Note: Z100 Jingle Ball)	New York City	United States	Madison Square Garden
December 12, 2003 (Note: Q102 Jingle Ball)	Camden	United States	Tweeter Center at the Waterfront
December 15, 2003 (Note: KISS 108 Jingle Ball)	Lowell	United States	Paul E. Tsongas Arena
December 16, 2003	West Palm Beach	United States	Coral Sky Amphitheatre
January 10, 2004	San Antonio	United States	Municipal Auditorium
January 24, 2004	Universal City	United States	Universal Amphitheatre
January 25, 2004	San Diego	United States	Cox Arena
February 7, 2004	Las Vegas	United States	Mandalay Bay
February 28, 2004	Sacramento	United States	Arco Arena
February 29, 2004	Reno	United States	Lawlor Events Center
March 14, 2004	Hamilton	Canada	Copps Coliseum
March 16, 2004	Cleveland	United States	CSU Convocation Center
March 17, 2004	Evansville	United States	Roberts Stadium
March 18, 2004	North Little Rock	United States	Alltel Arena
March 19, 2004	Beaumont	United States	Ford Arena
March 21, 2004	Laredo	United States	Laredo Entertainment Center
May 14, 2004 (Note: 93.3 Your Show 5)	San Diego	United States	Coors Amphitheater
May 15, 2004 (Note: KIIS FM' Wango Tango)	Pasadena	United States	Rose Bowl
May 16, 2004	West Hollywood	United States	House of Blues Sunset Strip

== Most Wanted Tour ==
Most Wanted Tour
- Tour by Hilary Duff
- Location: Asia; North America; Oceania; South America
- Associated album: Hilary Duff
- Start date: July 20, 2004
- End date: April 10, 2005
- Legs: 5
- No. of shows: 72

Hilary Duff concert chronology
- Metamorphosis Tour (2003–2004); Most Wanted Tour (2004–2005); Still Most Wanted Tour (2005–2006)

The Most Wanted Tour is the second concert tour by the American pop singer Hilary Duff. The tour supported Duff's studio album, Hilary Duff. The tour was a moderate success, practically selling out each arena prior to the show. Haylie Duff, Hilary's sister, was the opening act of the tour before the set list started.

=== Set list ===
1. “Girl Can Rock”
2. "Little Voice"
3. "Weird"
4. "Come Clean"
5. "Anywhere But Here"
6. "Metamorphosis"
7. "So Yesterday"
8. "Haters"
9. "Where Did I Go Right?"
10. "Do You Want Me?"
11. "Workin' it Out"
12. "Why Not"
13. "Party Up"
14. "Rock This World"
15. "Fly"
16. "The Getaway"
17. "Our Lips Are Sealed"
18. "My Generation"
19. "The Math"

=== Tour dates ===
List of 2004 concerts
Date	City	Country	Venue	Opening act
July 20, 2004	Worcester	United States	Centrum Center	Haylie Duff
July 21, 2004	Philadelphia	United States	Wachovia Center	Haylie Duff
July 22, 2004	Fairfax	United States	Patriot Center	Haylie Duff
July 24, 2004	Hershey	United States	Giant Center	Haylie Duff
July 25, 2004	East Rutherford	United States	Continental Airlines Arena	Haylie Duff
July 26, 2004	Uniondale	United States	Nassau Coliseum	Haylie Duff
July 27, 2004	Pittsburgh	United States	Petersen Events Center	Haylie Duff
July 29, 2004	Auburn Hills	United States	The Palace	Haylie Duff
July 30, 2004	Rosemont	United States	Allstate Arena	Haylie Duff
July 31, 2004	Milwaukee	United States	Bradley Center	Haylie Duff
August 1, 2004	Minneapolis	United States	Target Center	Haylie Duff
August 3, 2004	St. Charles	United States	Family Arena	Haylie Duff
August 4, 2004	Indianapolis	United States	Conseco Fieldhouse	Haylie Duff
August 5. 2004	Nashville	United States	Gaylord Entertainment Center	Haylie Duff
August 7, 2004	Charlotte	United States	Cricket Arena	Haylie Duff
August 8, 2004	Duluth	United States	Gwinnett Center	Haylie Duff
August 9, 2004	Greenville	United States	Bi Lo Center	Haylie Duff
August 11, 2004	Jacksonville	United States	Jacksonville Arena	Haylie Duff
August 12, 2004	Tampa	United States	Sundome	Haylie Duff
August 13, 2004	Sunrise	United States	Office Depot Center	Haylie Duff
August 15, 2004	New Orleans	United States	New Orleans Arena	Haylie Duff
August 18, 2004	Austin	United States	Frank Erwin Center	Haylie Duff
August 19, 2004	Grand Prairie	United States	Nokia Live	Haylie Duff
August 20, 2004	Lubbock	United States	United Spirit Arena	Haylie Duff
August 21, 2004	Norman	United States	Lloyd Noble Center	Haylie Duff
August 22, 2004	Wichita	United States	Kansas Coliseum	Haylie Duff
August 25, 2004	Salt Lake City	United States	Delta Center	Haylie Duff
August 26, 2004	Nampa	United States	Idaho Center	Haylie Duff
August 31, 2004	Oakland	United States	Oakland Arena	Haylie Duff
September 1, 2004	Fresno	United States	Save Mart Arena	Haylie Duff
September 2, 2004	Anaheim	United States	Arrowhead Pond	Haylie Duff
September 3, 2004	Las Vegas	United States	MGM Grand Garden Arena	Haylie Duff
September 5, 2004 (Note: Matinee and night show)	Phoenix	United States	Dodge Theatre	Haylie Duff
September 8, 2004	Portland	United States	Rose Garden Arena	Haylie Duff
September 9, 2004	Seattle	United States	Key Arena	Haylie Duff
September 10, 2004	Vancouver	Canada	Pacific Coliseum	Haylie Duff
September 12, 2004	Calgary	Canada	Pengrowth Saddledome	Haylie Duff
October 18, 2004	Osaka	Japan	Zepp	—N/a
October 20, 2004	Tokyo	Japan	Zepp	—N/a
October 21, 2004	Tokyo	Japan	Zepp	—N/a
October 27, 2004	Melbourne	Australia	Rod Laver Arena	Scott Cain
October 28, 2004	Sydney	Australia	Entertainment Centre	Scott Cain
October 30, 2004	Honolulu	United States	Blaisdell Arena	—N/a
December 1, 2004 (Note: 97.1 ZHT Jingle Ball)	Salt Lake City	United States	Delta Center	—N/a
December 4, 2004 (Note: 107.9 The End Jingle Ball)	Sacramento	United States	ARCO Arena	—N/a
December 5, 2004 (Note: KISS 106.1 Jingle Bell Bash)	Tacoma	United States	Tacoma Dome	—N/a
December 8, 2004 (Note: 97.5 PST's Winter Wonder Jam)	Trenton	United States	Sovereign Bank Arena	—N/a
December 10, 2004 (Note: Z100 Jingle Ball)	New York City	United States	Madison Square Garden	—N/a
December 12, 2004 (Note: Y100 Jingle Ball)	Sunrise	United States	Office Depot Center	—N/a

List of 2005 concerts
Date	City	Country	Venue	Opening act
January 4, 2005	Kelowna	Canada	Prospera Place	—N/a
January 6, 2005	Calgary	Canada	Pengrowth Saddledome	—N/a
January 7, 2005	Edmonton	Canada	Rexall Place	—N/a
January 8, 2005	Saskatoon	Canada	Credit Union Centre	—N/a
January 10, 2005	Winnipeg	Canada	MTS Centre	—N/a
January 13, 2005	Kitchener	Canada	Kitchener Memorial Auditorium	—N/a
January 14, 2005	Toronto	Canada	Air Canada Centre	—N/a
January 15, 2005	Ottawa	Canada	Corel Centre	—N/a
January 16, 2005	Montreal	Canada	Bell Centre	—N/a
January 19, 2005	Ottawa	Canada	Corel Centre	—N/a
January 20, 2005	Toronto	Canada	Air Canada Centre	—N/a
January 21, 2005	Hamilton	Canada	Copps Coliseum	—N/a
January 22, 2005	Rochester	United States	Blue Cross Arena	—N/a
January 24, 2005	Albany	United States	Pepsi Arena	—N/a
January 25, 2005	Bridgeport	United States	Arena at Harbor Yard	—N/a
January 27, 2005	Manchester	United States	Verizon Wireless Arena	—N/a
January 28, 2005	Atlantic City	United States	Trump Taj Mahal Casino/Hotel Ettis Arena	—N/a
January 29, 2005	Wilkes-Barre	United States	Wachovia Arena	—N/a
March 4, 2005	Hidalgo	United States	Dodge Arena	—N/a
March 5, 2005	Corpus Christi	United States	American Bank Center	—N/a
March 6, 2005	Houston	United States	Houston Rodeo & Livestock	—N/a
April 10, 2005	Caracas	Venezuela	University of Caracas Baseball Stadium	Haylie Duff

== Still Most Wanted Tour ==
Still Most Wanted Tour
- Tour by Hilary Duff
- Location: Asia; Europe; North America; Oceania
- Associated album: Most Wanted
- Start date: July 12, 2005
- End date: September 24, 2006
- Legs: 6
- No. of shows: 78

Hilary Duff concert chronology
- Most Wanted Tour (2004–05); Still Most Wanted Tour (2005–06); Dignity Tour (2007–08)

The Still Most Wanted Tour is the third concert tour by American singer-songwriter Hilary Duff. The tour promoted her first greatest hits compilation, Most Wanted. Tour dates were canceled in Latin America. The tour was a success with the tour being sold out at over 80%.

=== Set list ===
1. "Wake Up"
2. "The Getaway"
3. "Do You Want Me?"
4. "Underneath This Smile"
5. "Come Clean"
6. "Anywhere but Here"
7. "Who's That Girl?"
8. "Someone's Watching over Me"
9. "Mr. James Dean"
10. "Hide Away"
11. "Beat of My Heart"
12. "Cry"
13. "I Am"
14. "Party Up"
15. "Fly"
16. "Break My Heart"
17. "Little Voice"
18. "So Yesterday"
19. "Rock This World"

=== Tour dates ===
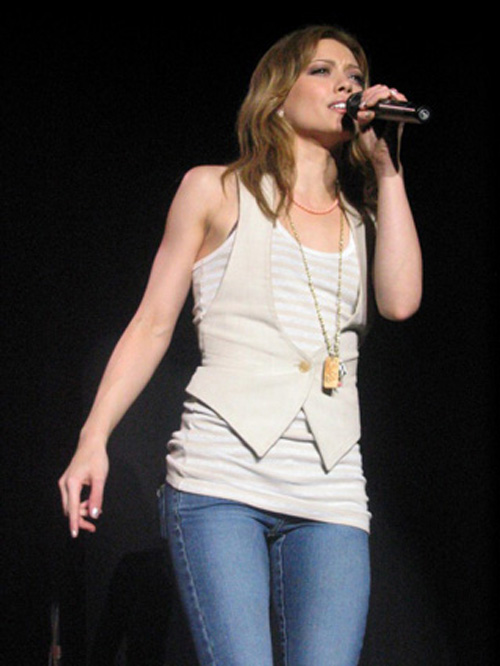
Duff performing in Amsterdam

Date	City	Country	Venue
North America
July 12, 2005	Los Angeles	United States	Greek Theatre
July 13, 2005	Costa Mesa	United States	Pacific Amphitheatre
July 16, 2005	Greenwood Village	United States	Fiddler's Green Amphitheatre
July 18, 2005	Mankato	United States	Midwest Wireless Civic Center
July 19, 2005	Rosemont	United States	Allstate Arena
July 20, 2005	Grand Rapids	United States	Van Andel Arena
July 22, 2005	Erie	United States	Erie Civic Center
July 24, 2005	Providence	United States	Dunkin' Donuts Center
July 25, 2005	Hartford	United States	Hartford Civic Center
July 27, 2005	Richmond	United States	Richmond Coliseum
July 30, 2005	Winston-Salem	United States	LJVM Coliseum
July 31, 2005	North Charleston	United States	North Charleston Coliseum
August 2, 2005	Miami	United States	American Airlines Arena
August 3, 2005	Kissimmee	United States	Silver Spurs Arena
August 4, 2005	Estero	United States	Germain Arena
August 7, 2005	Columbus	United States	Columbus Civic Center
August 11, 2005	Kansas City	United States	Kemper Arena
August 12, 2005	Council Bluffs	United States	Mid-America Center
August 16, 2005	Peoria	United States	Carver Arena
August 19, 2005	Louisville	United States	Freedom Hall
August 20, 2005	Clarkston	United States	DTE Energy Music Theatre
August 21, 2005	Madison	United States	Alliant Energy Center
August 23, 2005	Cincinnati	United States	U.S. Bank Arena
August 24, 2005	Columbus	United States	Nationwide Arena
August 26, 2005	Charleston	United States	Charleston Civic Center Coliseum
August 27, 2005	Baltimore	United States	1st Mariner Arena
August 30, 2005	East Rutherford	United States	Continental Airlines Arena
September 1, 2005	Uniondale	United States	Nassau Veterans Memorial Coliseum
September 2, 2005	Allentown	United States	Allentown Fair Concert Venue
September 3, 2005	Geddes	United States	New York State Fair Grandstand
September 23, 2005	Kelseyville	United States	Konocti Field Amphitheater
September 25, 2005	Puyallup	United States	Puyallup Fair Grandstand
November 13, 2005	San Juan	Puerto Rico	José Miguel Agrelot Coliseum
Oceania
December 2, 2005	Adelaide	Australia	Adelaide Entertainment Centre
December 3, 2005	Melbourne	Australia	Rod Laver Arena
December 5, 2005	Canberra	Australia	Royal Theatre
December 7, 2005	Newcastle	Australia	Newcastle Entertainment Centre
December 9, 2005	Wollongong	Australia	Wollongong Entertainment Centre
December 10, 2005	Sydney	Australia	Sydney Entertainment Centre
December 11, 2005	Brisbane	Australia	Brisbane Entertainment Centre
North America
January 4, 2006	Victoria	Canada	Save-On-Foods Memorial Centre
January 6, 2006	Kelowna	Canada	Prospera Place
January 7, 2006	Vancouver	Canada	Pacific Coliseum
January 9, 2006	Calgary	Canada	Pengrowth Saddledome
January 10, 2006	Red Deer	Canada	ENMAX Centrium
January 11, 2006	Edmonton	Canada	Rexall Place
January 13, 2006	Regina	Canada	Brandt Centre
January 14, 2006	Saskatoon	Canada	Credit Union Centre
January 15, 2006	Winnipeg	Canada	MTS Centre
January 18, 2006	Sudbury	Canada	Sudbury Community Arena
January 20, 2006	Hamilton	Canada	Copps Coliseum
January 21, 2006	London	Canada	John Labatt Centre
January 22, 2006	Toronto	Canada	Air Canada Centre
January 25, 2006	Moncton	Canada	Moncton Coliseum
January 26, 2006	Saint John	Canada	Harbour Station
~~January 28, 2006~~ (Note: The January 28, 2006, show in St. John's at Mile One Stadium was canceled due to the weather.)	~~St. John's~~	Canada	~~Mile One Stadium~~
January 30, 2006	Halifax	Canada	Halifax Metro Centre
February 1, 2006	Montreal	Canada	Bell Centre
February 2, 2006	Ottawa	Canada	Corel Centre
February 6, 2006 (Note: The February 6, 2006, performance was part of the San Antonio Stock Show and Rodeo.)	San Antonio	United States	AT&T Center
Europe
April 21, 2006	Dublin	Ireland	Point Theatre
April 23, 2006	Glasgow	Scotland	Clyde Auditorium
April 25, 2006	Manchester	England	Manchester Evening News Arena
April 26, 2006	Brighton	England	Brighton Centre
April 27, 2006	London	England	Hammersmith Apollo
April 29, 2006	Birmingham	England	National Indoor Arena
April 30, 2006	Amsterdam	Netherlands	Heineken Music Hall
May 2, 2006	Paris	France	Le Grand Rex
May 5, 2006	Badalona	Spain	Palau Municipal d'Esports de Badalona
May 6, 2006	Madrid	Spain	Plaza de Toros de Las Ventas
May 7, 2006	Valencia	Spain	Palacio Velódromo Luis Puig
May 9, 2006	Milan	Italy	Discoteca Alcatraz
May 10, 2006	Milan	Italy	Discoteca Alcatraz
Asia
May 12, 2006	Nagpur	India	Tuli Royal Court
May 13, 2006	Jalandhar	India	Gandhi Stadium
May 14, 2006	New Delhi	India	Indira Gandhi Arena
North America
May 16, 2006	Monterrey	Mexico	Arena Monterrey
May 18, 2006	Guadalajara	Mexico	Arena VFG
May 20, 2006	Mexico City	Mexico	Palacio de los Deportes
June 10, 2006 (Note: The June 10, 2006, performance was part of Kids' Extravalooza, A free event to benefit the National Children's Museum.)	Washington, D.C.	United States	L'Enfant Plaza
June 30, 2006	Kelseyville	United States	Konocti Harbor Resort
July 20, 2006	St. John's	Canada	Mile One Stadium
July 22, 2006	Halifax	Canada	Halifax Metro Centre
July 25, 2006	London	Canada	John Labatt Centre
July 26, 2006	Toronto	Canada	Molson Amphitheatre
July 28, 2006	Atlantic City	United States	Trump Taj Mahal
July 29, 2006	Toms River	United States	Toms River Fest
July 30, 2006	Hershey	United States	Giant Center
September 24, 2006	Puyallup	United States	Puyallup Fair

Cancelled date

Date	City	Country	Venue
South America
~~May 30, 2006~~ (Note: The May 30, 2006, show in São Paulo, Brazil at Via Funchal was canceled due Duff's throat problems. Hilary played in the same city and in the same venue two years later with her Dignity Tour.)	~~São Paulo~~	~~Brazil~~	~~Via Funchal~~

== Dignity Tour ==
Dignity Tour
- Tour by Hilary Duff
- Location: North America; Oceania; South America
- Associated album: Dignity
- Start date: July 28, 2007
- End date: February 3, 2008
- Legs: 3
- No. of shows: 40

Hilary Duff concert chronology
- Still Most Wanted Tour (2005–06); Dignity Tour (2007–08); Small Rooms, Big Nerves (2026)

The Dignity Tour is the fourth concert tour by Hilary Duff in support of her fourth studio album Dignity. Tickets for most of the leg sold out prior to the show. The tour began on July 28, 2007, and closed in Melbourne, Australia at Rod Laver Arena on February 3, 2008.

=== Concert video ===
Filming of the Dignity Tour took place on August 15, 2007, at Gibson Amphitheatre. In 2010, it was released exclusively on the U.S. iTunes Store. However, most likely due to copyright laws, the iTunes video does not include the performances of any cover songs including "Our Lips Are Sealed" and "Love Is A Battlefield". As a result, "Never Stop" was also edited out of the footage because it samples "Major Tom (Coming Home)".

=== Set list ===
1. "Play with Fire"
2. "Danger"
3. "Come Clean"
4. "The Getaway"
5. "Dignity"
6. "Gypsy Woman"
7. "Someone's Watching Over Me"
8. "Beat of My Heart"
9. "Our Lips Are Sealed"
10. "Why Not"
11. "So Yesterday"
12. "With Love"
13. "Never Stop" (samples "Major Tom (Coming Home)").
14. "Wake Up"
15. "I Wish"
16. "Love Is a Battlefield"
17. "Outside of You"
18. "Fly"
19. "Happy"
20. "Dreamer"
21. "Reach Out"
22. "Stranger"

=== Tour dates ===
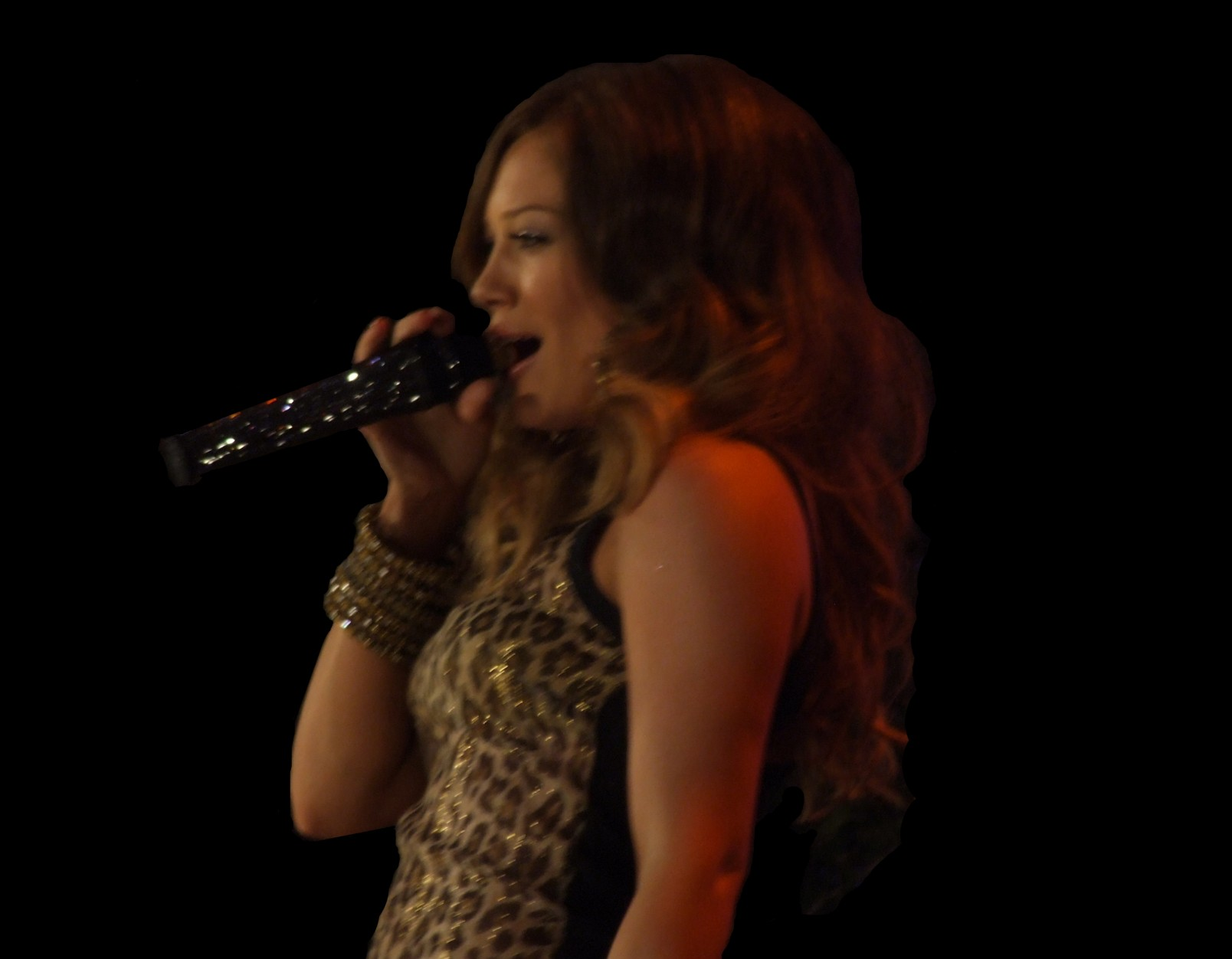
Duff performing in Toronto

Date	City	Country	Venue
North America
July 28, 2007	Winnipeg	Canada	MTS Centre
July 30, 2007	Saskatoon	Canada	Credit Union Centre
July 31, 2007	Calgary	Canada	Pengrowth Saddledome
August 1, 2007	Edmonton	Canada	Rexall Place
August 3, 2007	Vancouver	Canada	Pacific Coliseum
August 4, 2007	Victoria	Canada	Save-On-Foods Memorial Centre
August 6, 2007	Everett	United States	Everett Events Center
August 7, 2007	Portland	United States	Arlene Schnitzer Concert Hall
August 11, 2007	Concord	United States	Sleep Train Pavilion
August 12, 2007	Fresno	United States	Saroyan Theatre
August 14, 2007	San Diego	United States	SDSU Open Air Theatre
August 15, 2007	Los Angeles	United States	Gibson Amphitheatre
August 17, 2007	Anaheim	United States	The Grove of Anaheim
August 18, 2007	Las Vegas	United States	Pearl Concert Theater
August 19, 2007	Phoenix	United States	Dodge Theatre
August 21, 2007	Greenwood Village	United States	Fiddler's Green Amphitheatre
August 23, 2007	Minneapolis	United States	U.S. Bank Theater
August 25, 2007	Louisville	United States	Palace Theatre
August 27, 2007	New York City	United States	Radio City Music Hall
August 29, 2007	Syracuse	United States	Mohegan Sun Grandstand
August 30, 2007	Boston	United States	Bank of America Pavilion
August 31, 2007	Allentown	United States	Allentown Fairgrounds Grandstand
September 1, 2007	Darien	United States	Darien Lake Performing Arts Center
September 4, 2007 (Note: Concert in Montreal; Rescheduled from July 19, 2007)	Montreal	Canada	Bell Centre
September 5, 2007 (Note: Concert in Ottawa; Rescheduled from July 20, 2007)	Ottawa	Canada	Scotiabank Place
September 6, 2007 (Note: Concert in Hamilton; Rescheduled from July 23, 2007)	Hamilton	Canada	Copps Coliseum
September 8, 2007 (Note: Concert in Toronto; Rescheduled from July 21, 2007)	Toronto	Canada	Air Canada Centre
September 10, 2007 (Note: Concert in London; Rescheduled from July 24, 2007)	London	Canada	John Labatt Centre
September 11, 2007 (Note: Concert in Sault Ste. Marie; Rescheduled from July 25, 2007)	Sault Ste. Marie	Canada	Steelback Centre
September 12, 2007	Chicago	United States	Charter One Pavilion
January 12, 2008	Monterrey	Mexico	Arena Monterrey
January 14, 2008	Puebla	Mexico	Auditorio Siglo XXI
January 16, 2008	Zapopan	Mexico	Auditorio Telmex
January 18, 2008	Mexico City	Mexico	Palacio de los Deportes
South America
January 21, 2008	São Paulo	Brazil	Via Funchal
January 22, 2008	São Paulo	Brazil	Via Funchal
January 24, 2008	Rio de Janeiro	Brazil	Vivo Rio
Oceania
January 31, 2008	Brisbane	Australia	Brisbane Entertainment Centre
February 2, 2008	Sydney	Australia	Acer Arena
February 3, 2008	Melbourne	Australia	Rod Laver Arena

== Small Rooms, Big Nerves ==
Small Rooms, Big Nerves
- Tour by Hilary Duff
- Location: Canada; UK; US
- Associated album: Luck... or Something
- Start date: January 19, 2026
- End date: May 24, 2026
- No. of shows: 10

Hilary Duff concert chronology
- Dignity Tour (2007–2008); Small Rooms, Big Nerves (2026); The Lucky Me Tour (2026–2027)

Small Rooms, Big Nerves is the fifth concert tour by Hilary Duff. It commenced on January 19, 2026, in London, England, and concluded in Las Vegas, United States, on May 24. The tour was initially announced to consist of four dates, but in December 2025, the tour was extended for six additional dates in Las Vegas, United States. Venues for the entirety of the tour consisted of smaller-capacity theaters rather than arenas. The tour was a success, with each date selling out.

Reviews for the tour have been positive, with The Guardian rating it four out of five stars, calling the London show "euphoric, escapist fun" while NY Post called the Brooklyn show a “perfect warm hug of nostalgia”. The tour also marks the live debut performances of "What Dreams Are Made Of" from The Lizzie McGuire Movie.

=== Set list ===
This set list is from the concert in London on January 19, 2026.

1. "Wake Up"
2. "So Yesterday"
3. "Roommates"
4. "Weather for Tennis"
5. "Metamorphosis"
6. "Fly"
7. "My Kind"
8. "Sparks"
9. "Future Tripping"
10. "With Love"
11. "Beat of My Heart"
12. "Someone's Watching Over Me"
13. "We Don't Talk"
14. "Why Not"
15. "Come Clean"
16. "Mature"
17. "What Dreams Are Made Of"

=== Tour dates ===
2026 tour dates
Date (2026)	City	Country	Venue
January 19	London	England	O_{2} Shephard's Bush Empire
January 24	Toronto	Canada	History
January 27	New York City (Note: Billed as Brooklyn in promotional material.)	United States	Brooklyn Paramount
January 29	Los Angeles	United States	The Wiltern
February 13	Las Vegas	United States	Voltaire
February 14	Las Vegas	United States	Voltaire
February 15	Las Vegas	United States	Voltaire
May 22	Las Vegas	United States	Voltaire
May 23	Las Vegas	United States	Voltaire
May 24	Las Vegas	United States	Voltaire

== The Lucky Me Tour ==
The Lucky Me Tour
- Tour by Hilary Duff
- Location: Europe; North America; Oceania; South America
- Associated album: Luck... or Something
- Start date: June 21, 2026
- End date: November 20, 2027
- No. of shows: 91
- Supporting acts: La Roux; Jade LeMac; Lauren Spencer Smith; Rebecca Black; Dashboard Confessional; Tegan and Sara

Hilary Duff concert chronology
- Small Rooms, Big Nerves (2026); The Lucky Me Tour (2026–2027)

The Lucky Me Tour is the sixth concert tour by Hilary Duff. The tour commenced on June 21, 2026, in West Palm Beach, United States, and will conclude on November 20, 2027, in Anaheim, United States. Ahead of the general sale, supplemental concerts were added, due to demand.

=== Set list ===
This set list is from the concert in West Palm Beach on June 21, 2026. It may not represent all concerts for the duration of the tour.

1. "Wake Up"
2. "So Yesterday"
3. "Roommates"
4. "Weather for Tennis"
5. "Play with Fire"
6. "Breathe In. Breathe Out."
7. "Sparks"
8. "Future Tripping"
9. "With Love"
10. "Beat of My Heart"
11. "You, from the Honeymoon"
12. "Anywhere but Here"
13. "Growing Up"
14. "Fly"
15. "Holiday Party"
16. "We Don't Talk"
17. "Why Not"
18. "Adult Size Medium"
19. "Come Clean"
20. "Mature"
21. "What Dreams Are Made Of"

=== Alterations ===
- During the first show in New York City, "The Anthem" was performed with Benji and Joel Madden.

=== Tour dates ===
List of 2026 concerts
Date (2026)	City	Country	Venue	Supporting acts
June 21	West Palm Beach	United States	iTHINK Financial Amphitheatre	Jade LeMac
June 22	West Palm Beach	United States	iTHINK Financial Amphitheatre	Jade LeMac
June 23	Tampa	United States	MidFlorida Credit Union Amphitheatre	Jade LeMac
June 25	Alpharetta	United States	Ameris Bank Amphitheatre	La Roux; Jade LeMac
June 27	The Woodlands	United States	Cynthia Woods Mitchell Pavilion	La Roux; Jade LeMac
June 28	Austin	United States	Germania Insurance Amphitheater	La Roux; Jade LeMac
June 30	Irving	United States	The Pavilion at Toyota Music Factory	La Roux; Jade LeMac
July 2	Albuquerque	United States	First Financial Credit Union Amphitheater	La Roux; Jade LeMac
July 3	Phoenix	United States	Talking Stick Resort Amphitheatre	La Roux; Jade LeMac
July 8	Inglewood	United States	Kia Forum	La Roux; Jade LeMac
July 9	Inglewood	United States	Kia Forum	La Roux; Jade LeMac
July 11	Mountain View	United States	Shoreline Amphitheatre	La Roux; Jade LeMac
July 12	Wheatland	United States	Toyota Amphitheatre	La Roux; Jade LeMac
July 14	Ridgefield	United States	Cascades Amphitheater	La Roux; Jade LeMac
July 15	Auburn	United States	White River Amphitheatre	La Roux; Jade LeMac
July 17	West Valley City	United States	First Credit Union Amphitheatre	La Roux; Jade LeMac
July 20	Morrison	United States	Red Rocks Amphitheater	La Roux; Jade LeMac
July 22	Maryland Heights	United States	Hollywood Casino Amphitheater	La Roux; Jade LeMac
July 23	Noblesville	United States	Ruoff Music Center	La Roux; Jade LeMac
July 25	Shakopee	United States	Mystic Lake Amphitheater	La Roux; Jade LeMac
July 26	Tinley Park	United States	Credit Union 1 Amphitheatre	La Roux; Jade LeMac
July 28	Cincinnati	United States	Riverbend Music Center	La Roux; Jade LeMac
July 29	Franklin	United States	FirstBank Amphitheater	La Roux; Jade LeMac
July 30	Nashville	United States	Ascend Amphitheater	La Roux; Jade LeMac
August 1	Charlotte	United States	Truliant Amphitheater	La Roux; Jade LeMac
August 2	Bristow	United States	Jiffy Lube Live	La Roux; Jade LeMac
August 5	New York City	United States	Madison Square Garden	La Roux; Jade LeMac
August 6	New York City	United States	Madison Square Garden	La Roux; Jade LeMac
August 8	Mansfield	United States	Xfinity Center	La Roux; Jade LeMac
August 9	Philadelphia	United States	TD Pavilion	La Roux; Jade LeMac
August 12	Toronto	Canada	RBC Amphitheatre	La Roux; Jade LeMac
August 13	Toronto	Canada	RBC Amphitheatre	La Roux; Jade LeMac
August 15	Clarkston	United States	Pine Knob Music Theatre	La Roux; Jade LeMac
August 16	Grand Rapids	United States	Acrisure Amphitheater	La Roux; Jade LeMac
September 6	Dublin	Ireland	3Arena	La Roux
September 8	Cardiff	Wales	Utilita Arena	La Roux
September 10	London	England	The O_{2} Arena	La Roux
September 12	Manchester	England	AO Arena	La Roux
September 13	Glasgow	Scotland	OVO Hydro	La Roux
September 15	London	England	The O_{2} Arena	La Roux
October 20	Auckland	New Zealand	Spark Arena	La Roux
October 22	Brisbane	Australia	Entertainment Centre	La Roux
October 24	Sydney	Australia	Afterpay Arena	La Roux
October 26	Melbourne	Australia	Rod Laver Arena	La Roux
October 27	Melbourne	Australia	Rod Laver Arena	La Roux
October 29	Perth	Australia	RAC Arena	La Roux

List of 2027 concerts
Date (2027)	City	Country	Venue	Supporting act
January 22	Vancouver	Canada	Rogers Arena	Lauren Spencer Smith
January 23	Vancouver	Canada	Rogers Arena	Lauren Spencer Smith
January 26	Calgary	Canada	Scotiabank Saddledome	Lauren Spencer Smith
January 27	Edmonton	Canada	Rogers Place	Lauren Spencer Smith
January 29	Saskatoon	Canada	SaskTel Centre	Lauren Spencer Smith
January 30	Winnipeg	Canada	Canada Life Centre	Lauren Spencer Smith
February 2	Hamilton	Canada	TD Coliseum	Lauren Spencer Smith
February 4	Ottawa	Canada	Canadian Tire Centre	Lauren Spencer Smith
February 5	Montreal	Canada	Bell Centre	Lauren Spencer Smith
February 7	Halifax	Canada	Scotiabank Centre	Lauren Spencer Smith
February 12	Mexico City	Mexico	Palacio de los Deportes	Lauren Spencer Smith
February 13	Mexico City	Mexico	Palacio de los Deportes	Lauren Spencer Smith
February 15	Guadalajara	Mexico	Auditorio Telmex	Lauren Spencer Smith
May 7	Madrid	Spain	Movistar Arena	Rebecca Black
May 10	Milan	Italy	Unipol Dome	Rebecca Black
May 12	Berlin	Germany	Velodrome	Rebecca Black
May 14	Paris	France	Zenith Paris	Rebecca Black
May 16	Brussels	Belgium	Forest National	Rebecca Black
May 17	Amsterdam	Netherlands	Ziggo Dome	Rebecca Black
May 18	Cologne	Germany	Lanxess Arena	Rebecca Black
May 20	Copenhagen	Denmark	Royal Arena	Rebecca Black
May 22	Stockholm	Sweden	Avicii Arena	Rebecca Black
August 10	San Juan	Puerto Rico	Coliseo de Puerto Rico	-
August 13	São Paulo	Brazil	Espaço Unimed	-
August 17	Buenos Aires	Argentina	Movistar Arena	-
August 20	Santiago	Chile	Santander Arena	-
October 1	Sunrise	United States	Amerant Bank Arena	Dashboard Confessional
October 2	Orlando	United States	Kia Center	Dashboard Confessional
October 4	Raleigh	United States	Lenovo Center	Dashboard Confessional
October 6	Baltimore	United States	CFG Bank Arena	Dashboard Confessional
October 8	Uncasville	United States	Mohegan Sun Arena	Dashboard Confessional
October 9	Hershey	United States	Giant Center	Dashboard Confessional
October 11	Buffalo	United States	KeyBank Center	Dashboard Confessional
October 13	Cleveland	United States	Rocket Arena	Dashboard Confessional
October 15	Columbus	United States	Schottenstein Center	Dashboard Confessional
October 16	Pittsburgh	United States	PPG Paints Arena	Dashboard Confessional
November 5	San Antonio	United States	Frost Bank Center	Tegan and Sara
November 6	Fort Worth	United States	Ariat Arena	Tegan and Sara
November 8	Tulsa	United States	BOK Center	Tegan and Sara
November 10	Omaha	United States	CHI Health Center	Tegan and Sara
November 12	Milwaukee	United States	Fiserv Forum	Tegan and Sara
November 14	Des Moines	United States	Casey's Center	Tegan and Sara
November 15	Kansas City	United States	T-Mobile Center	Tegan and Sara
November 17	Denver	United States	Ball Arena	Tegan and Sara
November 20	Anaheim	United States	Honda Center	Tegan and Sara
