= Sparks (Hilary Duff song) =

2015 single by Hilary Duff

Single by Hilary Duff

from the album Breathe In. Breathe Out.
- Released: April 7, 2015
- Recorded: February 2015
- Genre: Dance-pop; synth-pop
- Length: 3:05
- Label: RCA
- Songwriters: Christian "Bloodshy" Karlsson; Peter Thomas; Tove Lo; Sam Shrieve
- Producers: Peter Thomas; Bloodshy; Svidden; Emily Wright

Hilary Duff singles chronology
"All About You" (2014)	"Sparks" (2015)	"Never Let You Go" (2020)

Music video
- "Hilary Duff - Sparks" on YouTube

Music video
- "Hilary Duff - Sparks (Fan Demanded Version)" on YouTube

"Sparks" is a song recorded by American singer Hilary Duff for her fifth studio album, Breathe In. Breathe Out. (2015). It was written and produced by Christian "Bloodshy" Karlsson and Peter Thomas, with additional writing from Tove Lo and Sam Shrieve, and co-production from Svidden. The song was released on April 7, 2015, by RCA Records as the album's official leading single.

The music video was released on May 14, 2015, and features Duff on various Tinder dates. Less than a month later, Duff released a "Fan-Demanded" version video, which does not show the Tinder material and instead focuses more on Duff and her choreographed dancing to the song. "Sparks" experienced only moderate success on the Billboard Hot 100, peaking at 93, but became her fourth top ten entry on the dance chart. It additionally charted in Australia and Canada.

== Background and release ==
On July 23, 2014, Hilary Duff announced that she had signed a recording contract with RCA Records and would be releasing her first single in five years, "Chasing the Sun", on July 29. Later that same week, she revealed that she would finish and release her fifth studio album, her first since 2007's Dignity, in between filming of her new television show, Younger. She planned to do a little bit of promotion for the album during this period, but would not begin a "full press push" until filming of the show wrapped on December 12. Less than a month after the release of "Chasing the Sun", Duff revealed that she would release a second single, "All About You", on August 12. She announced later that same month that the album would not be released in October as originally planned and that fans would have to wait a "few more months" for it to be released.

On January 10, 2015, Duff revealed that recording for the album would continue now that the filming of Younger was completed. While her music career was originally her primary focus, she had to "take a step back" while filming of the show was underway. According to Duff, she was disappointed that she never got a chance to "properly promote" the singles, but that their releases gave her "a little taste of it again" after "being out of the music game for seven years". "It’s just a balancing act of trying to have two careers that take up a lot of my time. And also being a mom — the most important one for me", Duff said. In late January, she travelled to Sweden, where she collaborated with Swedish singer Tove Lo and record producer Jason "Ginni" Gill. According to Duff, she "knocked out" about four songs while she was there that "created a cool vibe for the record".

On February 5, she posted a short clip on Instagram previewing a new song, with the caption: "Remember when I said I’d die for you". Duff hinted on March 25 that she would be releasing a sneak peek of a new song, writing on her Twitter page: "Excited for you guys to hear a sneak peek of what @iamtovelo, Bloodshy, @iamPeterThomas and I have been working on..stay tuned tomorrow!". The following day, she posted a one-minute long sneak peek of Younger on YouTube, which was accompanied by a preview of a new song called "Sparks". After posting the video, she revealed that the full song would be released on April 7, and that fans could Shazam the song "to unlock the single cover".

A re-recorded version of the song was originally released as a bonus track on select editions of Duff's sixth studio album Luck... or Something, but was later released to digital download and streaming platforms on May 29, 2026, as a part of the (Mine) EP, featuring other re-recordings of Duff's older songs.

== Composition ==
"Sparks" is a dance-pop and synthpop song with an approximate length of three minutes and five seconds. According to Nolan Feeney of Time magazine, it is a "bubbly slice" of Swedish dance-pop. The song's instrumentation contains tribal elements, which according to Carolyn Menyes of Music News, gives it the "infectious dance-ability that could really only be found in 2015". Writing for Entertainment Weekly, Madison Vain drew comparisons of the song to the work of American singer Britney Spears, specifically her 2004 single "Toxic", which was co-produced by Bloodshy. Carolyn Menyes of Music Times likened the song to the musical style of Australian singer Kylie Minogue.

"Sparks" opens with a whistled melody that is backed with "low key blips", before Duff begins singing the first verse: "I can't hear a single word / Just know you're talking ‘cause your lips keep moving / Every thing I thought I'd learned / Goes out the window / All I want is one thing". Her "light" and "sweet-sounding" vocals are surrounded by "high twinkles", which Vanessa Golembewski of Refinery29 called "bubble gum enough you want to listen to it, but not so saccharine you feel like you stole your little sister's Disney channel CD." Writing for Ryan Seacrest's entertainment website, Marc Inocencio noted that instead of "crescendoing into a synth-heavy drop", the song "pulls back" with an "infectious whistle" in between choruses. Madeline Boardman of Us Weekly noted that the song's "steamy lyrics" are a "change of tone" for Duff.

== Critical response ==
Bradley Stern of Idolator wrote that unlike Duff's previous "folk-tinged" singles, "Chasing the Sun" and "All About You", "Sparks" marks the return to a "more familiar" dance-pop sound for the singer. The writer found the whistle breakdown in the song to be "unstoppably catchy", and wondered if it could be the "infectious hit" that she needs to be "propelled back onto pop radio". According to Vanessa Golembewski of Refinery29, "Sparks" has all of the defining characteristics of not just "a summer jam", but "the summer jam", writing that the beat is "good enough for both dancing and chilling out at home", and that the whistle is "definitely gonna be in your head for the next three months". Writing for Entertainment Weekly, Madison Vain called the song an "easy-to-digest summer jam" of the "most charming sort".

== Chart performance ==
The song debuted on the Billboard Hot 100 chart of July 4, 2015, at number 93. "Sparks" debuted at number 47 on the Dance Club songs chart, and reached a peak of number 6, becoming Duff's fourth top ten hit on the chart following three consecutive number ones from 2007 to 2008.

== Music videos ==
On May 14, 2015, Duff released a video for the single that featured her dancing while simultaneously chronicling her experiences on Tinder dates in a documentary style unusual for music videos. On May 28, following fan backlash, a "fan-demanded version" of the video was released in which the Tinder portions were cut. This version takes the form of a more traditional music video. It was directed by Hannah Lux Davis.

== Live performances ==
Duff performed "Sparks" for the first time at The Ellen DeGeneres Show on May 14, 2015. Duff performed the song again on May 16, 2015, at the "Kiss Concert 2015" along with 2 other songs. The song was also performed live on Good Morning America and The View.

== Track listing ==
- Digital download
1. "Sparks" – 3:05
- Cutmore Radio Mix
1. "Sparks" (Cutmore Radio Mix) – 3:12
- The Golden Pony Remix
1. "Sparks" (The Golden Pony Remix) – 3:41

Other versions

- Cutmore Club Mix
- Cutmore Dub
- Cutmore Radio Edit
- The Golden Pony Remix
- The Whistle Mash-Up

== Credits and personnel ==
- Songwriting – Christian Karlsson, Peter Thomas, Ebba Tove Elsa Nilsson, Sam Shrieve
- Production – Bloodshy, Peter Thomas
- Co-production – Svidden
- Mixing – Serban Ghenea
- Engineer – John Hanes

Credits adapted from Qobuz.com

== Charts ==
Chart (2015)	Peak position
Australia (ARIA)	104
Canada Hot 100 (Billboard)	63
CIS Airplay (TopHit)	182
Czech Republic Singles Digital (ČNS IFPI)	59
US Billboard Hot 100	93
US Dance Club Songs (Billboard)	6

== Certifications ==
Region	Certification	Certified units/sales
Mexico (AMPROFON)	Gold	30,000^{‡}
^{‡} Sales+streaming figures based on certification alone.

== Release history ==
Country	Date	Format	Label	Ref.
France	April 7, 2015	Digital download	Sony	
Germany	April 7, 2015	Digital download	Sony	
Italy	April 7, 2015	Digital download	Sony	
Spain	April 7, 2015	Digital download	Sony	
United States	April 7, 2015	Digital download	RCA	
Japan	April 8, 2015	Digital download	Sony	
United States	April 27, 2015	Hot/Modern/AC radio	RCA	
Russia	April 28, 2015	Contemporary hit radio	Sony	
