= Roommates (Hilary Duff song) =

2026 single by Hilary Duff

Single by Hilary Duff

from the album Luck... or Something
- Released: January 15, 2026
- Genre: Pop; synth-pop; electropop
- Length: 2:52
- Label: Sugarmouse; Atlantic
- Songwriters: Hilary Duff; Matthew Koma; Brian Phillips
- Producers: Brian Phillips; Matthew Koma

Hilary Duff singles chronology
"Mature" (2025)	"Roommates" (2026)	"Weather for Tennis" (2026)

Music video
- "Roommates" on YouTube

"Roommates" is a song by the American singer Hilary Duff. It was released on January 15, 2026, by Sugarmouse Inc. and Atlantic Records as the second single from her sixth studio album, Luck... or Something (2026). Duff co-wrote the song with its producers Matthew Koma and Brian Phillips.

== Background and release ==
After the release of the single "Mature" on November 7, 2025, Hilary Duff announced her sixth album, Luck...or Something, set to be released through Atlantic Records on 20 February 2026. In January 2026, Duff announced through her social media that the second single from the record would be "Roommates". An accompanying music video for "Roommates", directed by Matty Peacock, was released through video sharing platform YouTube on the same day as the release of the single.

== Composition ==
"Roommates" is a pop, synth-pop, and electropop song written by Duff with her husband Matthew Koma and Brian Phillips, the latter also producers of the track. Duff said that the song is about "the ache for a wilder, freer time, before the days were swallowed by carpools, budget talks, grocery runs and letting old or new insecurities slip in. [...] It's the restless hum of wanting to find your way back – to your rhythm, to your person, to yourself."

== Critical reception ==
Neil Yeung from AllMusic considered "Roommates" to be among the best songs from Luck... or Something, praising the production. He compared the track to Taylor Swift songs, a sentiment shared with several reviewers. Lyndsey Havens of Billboard wrote that "sexplicit lyrics aside, the song’s chorus sounds like a charged up Taylor Swift track, as Duff plays with the double meaning of becoming "Roommates" with a partner – and how quickly it can go from hot to not." Olivia Horn of Pitchfork described the song as "a pining single about trying to stoke the embers of a long-term relationship", finding references to Audrey Hobert's songwriting and Swift's "Anti-Hero" production approach.

== Live performances ==
Duff included "Roommates" on the set list for her Small Rooms, Big Nerves Tour, making its debut performance on January 19, 2026, in London, United Kingdom. On March 9, 2026, Duff performed the song on The Tonight Show Starring Jimmy Fallon.

== Charts ==
Chart performance
Chart (2026)	Peak position
Canada Hot AC (Billboard)	30
Japan Hot Overseas (Billboard Japan)	19
New Zealand Hot Singles (RMNZ)	23
UK Singles Sales (Official Charts)	37
US Adult Pop Airplay (Billboard)	13
US Digital Song Sales (Billboard)	12
US Pop Airplay (Billboard)	25

== Release history ==
List of release dates and formats
Region	Date	Format(s)	Version	Label	Ref.
Various	January 15, 2026	Digital download; streaming	Original	Sugarmouse; Atlantic	
Italy	January 16, 2026	Radio airplay	Original	Warner	
United States	January 27, 2026	Contemporary hit radio	Original	Sugarmouse; Atlantic	
United States	May 29, 2026	7-inch single	Original; mellow	Sugarmouse; Atlantic	
