= Luck... or Something =

2026 studio album by Hilary Duff

- Standard cover

Studio album by Hilary Duff
- Released: February 20, 2026
- Studios: Local Weather (The Valley, California)
- Genre: Pop
- Length: 37:49
- Labels: Sugarmouse; Atlantic
- Producers: Matthew Koma; Brian Phillips

Hilary Duff chronology
Breathe In. Breathe Out. (2015)	Luck... or Something (2026)	Mine (2026)

Singles from Luck... or Something
- 1. "Mature" Released: November 6, 2025; 2. "Roommates" Released: January 15, 2026; 3. "Weather for Tennis" Released: February 20, 2026

Luck... or Something (stylized in all lowercase) is the sixth studio album by American singer-songwriter Hilary Duff. It was released through Sugarmouse Inc. and Atlantic Records on February 20, 2026. Following a period of musical inactivity, Duff signed with Atlantic in September 2025, over a decade after the release of her last record, Breathe In. Breathe Out. (2015).

Duff assumed a greater role in the album's development, co-writing all of its tracks with her husband and previous collaborator Matthew Koma, who produced the entirety of the record with Brian Phillips. Musically, Luck... or Something is an introspective and personal album shaped by Duff's experiences over the prior decade. Its title reflects how she has navigated both her life and career: while "luck" played a role, "or something" points to the personal experiences, challenges, and emotions she encountered along the way.

Luck... or Something received generally positive reviews from music critics, who described the album as nostalgic and emotionally mature. It has charted at number one in Australia and Canada, as well as the top five in New Zealand, Scotland, United Kingdom, and the United States. The album has spawned three singles: "Mature", "Roommates", and "Weather for Tennis". To support Luck... or Something, Duff embarked on the Small Rooms, Big Nerves Tour, and followed it with the Lucky Me Tour. Atlantic Records also announced that Duff would feature in a Sam Wrench-directed documentary series, chronicling her return to music.

== Background ==
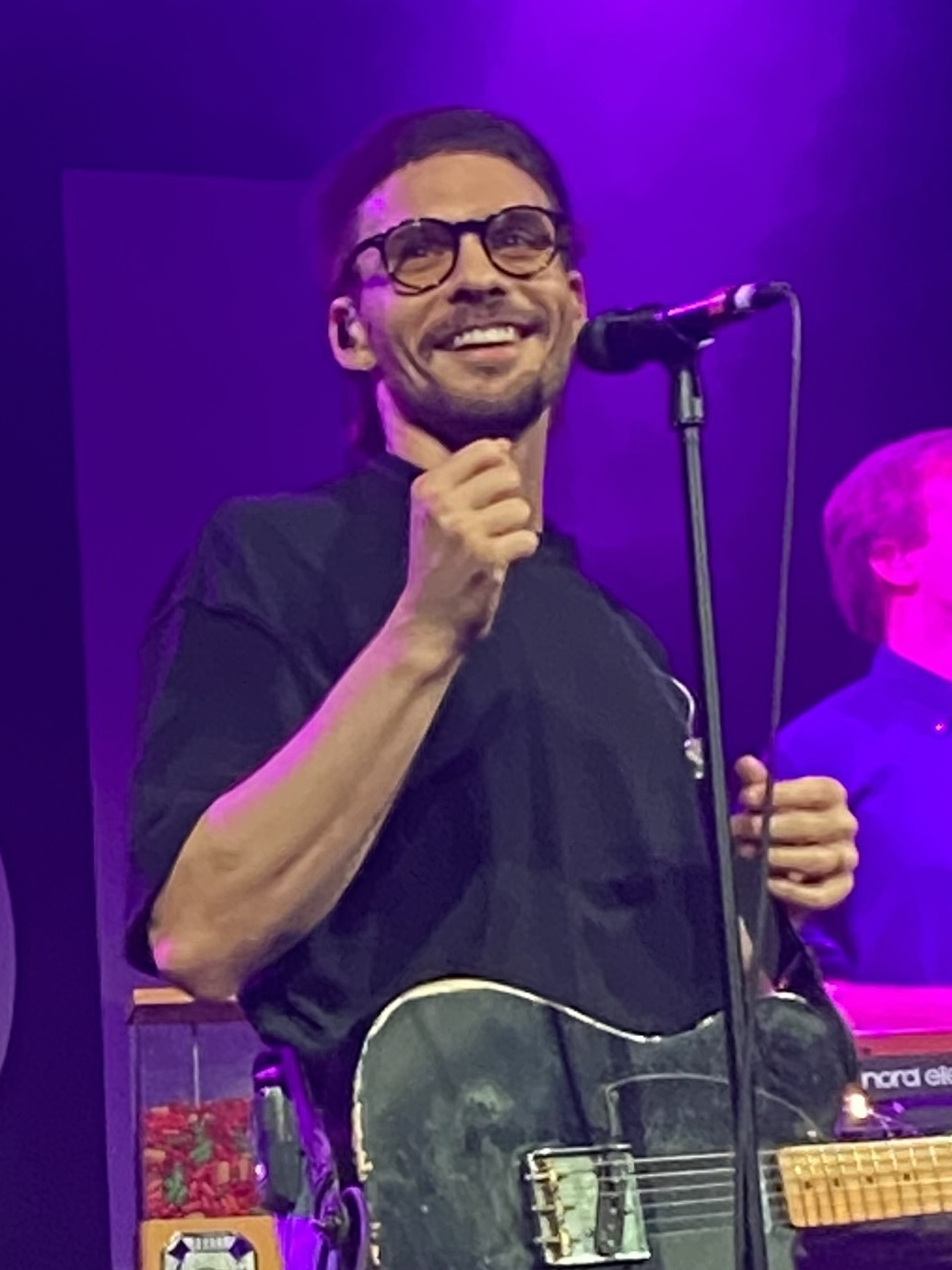
Duff's husband Matthew Koma (pictured) co-produced every track on the album.

In September 2025, Duff signed to Atlantic Records, 10 years after releasing her fifth studio album Breathe In. Breathe Out. The announcement of her return to music prompted renewed interest on streaming platforms; searches for Duff on Spotify reportedly increased by 400 percent, while U.S. streams of her catalogue rose by almost 80 percent and first-time listeners grew by approximately 75 percent. Atlantic Records also announced that Duff would feature in a documentary series directed by Sam Wrench, chronicling her return to music, the development of new material, and her preparations to perform again.

Duff began teasing the project on social media that month, hinting at forthcoming releases with the caption "New music ... or something". In October, she revealed that she had been working in the studio with her husband, Matthew Koma. Duff later went on to note that Koma had worked with her on the entirety of the album, and that it would not contain any further collaborations. She explained that a lot of the content on the record was "quite serious", but that it was "pop all the way", reflecting her personal tastes. Reflecting on her hiatus following the release of Breathe In. Breathe Out., Duff stated that she had always planned to return to music, but that she wanted to feel confident in doing so.

== Composition ==
"Roommates"
A synth-pop song "Roommates" describes the early days of a sexual relationship.

Luck... or Something is a pop album. Duff described it as deeply introspective, shaped by a decade of life experience, and expressed enthusiasm about reconnecting with audiences on a more personal level. The eleven tracks address themes concerning the singer's public and private life, tackling sexuality, family and friendship relationships, self-improvement, and her relationship with fame and fake speculations.

The second track "Roommates" is a midtempo and synth-pop song that features sexual lyrics and production comparable to Taylor Swift's song "Anti-Hero" (2022). Co-written with Duff, Koma, and Brian Phillips, it explores a relationship that has grown emotionally stagnant, as Duff discusses how moments of past intimacy have faded, which leaves the couple feeling more like roommates than romantic partners. "We Don't Talk" is about Duff's relationship with her sister Haylie Duff; Duff explained in an interview with CBS Mornings that "the most lonely part of my existence is not having my sister in my life at the moment". Duff interpolates Blink-182's "Dammit" in the track "Growing Up", which she dubbed as a "love letter to my fans".

In "The Optimist", Duff sings of her strained relationship with her father. She continues the theme of anticipated anger in "Holiday Party" in which she imagined a world where her partner cheats on her. Written by Duff alongside Koma and Madison Love, "Mature" is a "'80s-tinged pop", pop-rock, and guitar-pop track that blends polished 2020s production with reflective lyricism. It addresses Duff's younger self rather than a former lover, as it reframes the phrase "so mature for your age" as a point of reflection rather than flattery. The album's synth-pop closer, "Adult Size Medium", finds Duff reminiscing on her 20s and ends with a line mentioning the album's title.

== Promotion ==
=== Marketing and packaging ===
On November 2, 2025, Duff shared an Instagram Stories directing fans to her official website, which featured a second-by-second countdown scheduled to end at 1:00 p.m. Eastern Time Zone (UTC−05:00) the following day. The title of the album was announced on November 21, and the album became available for pre-order on the same day. Duff explained in a press release that the title of Luck... or Something reflects how she has navigated life and her career, noting that while "luck" played a role, the "or Something" alludes to the personal experiences, challenges, and emotional weight she has carried along the way, which ultimately shaped who she has become. The album title is taken from a lyric in the album's closing track, "Adult Sized Medium".

Over a period of few weeks beginning from the announcement of the album's release, Duff unveiled several limited-issue vinyl variants of the album. Each is labeled differently and accompanied by different cover artwork. Each variant features two re-recordings of Duff's greatest hits, each subtitled as "(mine)". The variants are as follows and feature re-recordings of the following songs; the Mature edition includes "Wake Up" (2005) and "So Yesterday" (2003), the Wine O'Clock edition includes "Come Clean" (2004) and "Why Not" (2003), and the Dirty Martini edition includes "What Dreams Are Made Of" (2003) and "Sparks" (2015). A Walmart exclusive edition of the album was released on compact disc, which includes a re-recording of "With Love" (2007) and the six aforementioned "(mine)" re-recordings as bonus tracks. On February 23, 2026, Duff released the Happy Hour edition of the album, a digital download-only release that was only available for a period of three days. The Happy Hour edition includes all of the "(mine)" re-recordings and four "mellow" versions of songs on the album. It also includes the three music videos for the album's singles alongside a previously unreleased music video for "What Dreams Are Made Of (mine)".

=== Singles ===
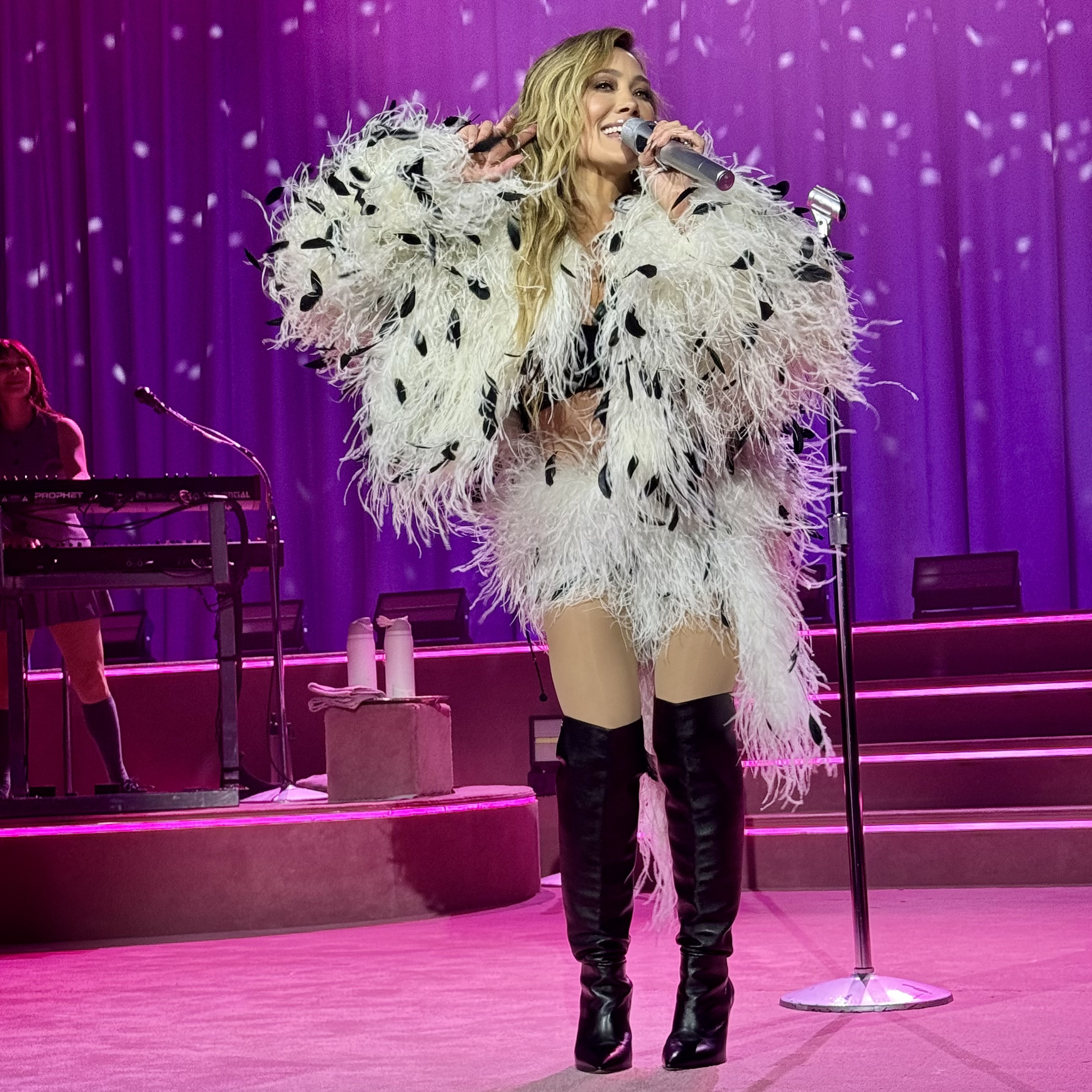
Duff performing "Mature" during the Small Rooms, Big Nerves tour on February 15, 2026.

Duff announced the album's lead single, "Mature", with its title and cover artwork via her Instagram, stating that she was "so happy this is finally yours to hear. Been keeping this one quiet too long." It was released on November 6, marking her first solo single in a decade. Its music video, directed by Lauren Dunn, was unveiled on the same day. On January 15, 2026, "Roommates" was released as the second single from the album. When announcing the song, she stated that it is about "when life is life-ing, babe". Co-written with Koma, the song's accompanying music video, directed by Matty Peacock, was released alongside the single. "Weather for Tennis" was released to Italian radio by Warner Music on February 20, as the album's third single.

=== Tours ===
To support the album, Duff embarked on her fifth tour, the Small Rooms, Big Nerves Tour. The ten-date tour began on January 19, 2026, at the O2 Shepherd's Bush Empire in London, and concluded at Voltaire in Las Vegas, on May 24. The tour was initially announced to consist of four dates, but in December, it was extended for six additional dates in Las Vegas. Initial presale registrations for the tour were made available until November 12 at 6 pm. ET (3 p.m. PT), with presale tickets going on sale November 14 at 10 a.m. local time; general ticket sales followed later that day at 3 p.m. local time. During the tour, Duff debuted three new songs from Luck... or Something: "Weather for Tennis", "Future Trippin'", and "We Don't Talk".

On February 12, 2026, Duff announced that she would embark on a subsequent world tour, the Lucky Me Tour, which tours North America, United Kingdom, Oceania, and Ireland. The tour commenced in June 2026 and will conclude in November 2027. The supporting acts for the first half of the tour are La Roux, Jade LeMac and Lauren Spencer Smith. The supporting acts for the second half of the tour are Rebecca Black, Dashboard Confessional, and Tegan and Sara.

== Critical reception ==
Professional ratings
Aggregate scores
Source	Rating
AnyDecentMusic?	6.8/10
Metacritic	72/100
Review scores
Source	Rating
AllMusic	4/5 stars
The Arts Desk	4/5 stars
Associated Press	2.5/5 stars
The AU Review	5/5 stars
The A.V. Club	C
Exclaim!	7/10
Pitchfork	6.3/10
PopMatters	8/10
Rolling Stone	4/5 stars
Slant Magazine	3/5 stars

Upon release, Luck... or Something received generally favorable reviews from music critics. AnyDecentMusic? gave the album a score of 6.8 out of 10 based on eight reviews.

Peter Gray of The AU Review gave Luck... or Something a five out of five star review, describing it as "[s]mart, self-aware, and emotionally grounded". The Arts Desk emphasized Duff's "incredibly smooth" transition into the 2020s pop music landscape, balancing themes of nostalgia and irony while also showcasing a sense of maturity in comparison to her earlier work. In a positive review, Neil Z. Yeung of AllMusic defined the album as the best of Duff's career, writing that it "feels more like her own voice and perspective" and "a brand of adult pop that is so welcome by offering more than the genre's typical youthful perspective without feeling stale, overly nostalgic, or stuck in the past".

Maya Georgi, writing for Rolling Stone, called the album a shimmering, synth-pop comeback that solidified Duff's status as a millennial icon. She also felt that the album skillfully blended nostalgia with a newfound emotional maturity, reflecting on themes of life, motherhood, and fame. Jeffrey Davies from PopMatters described its lyrical content as having more bold "vulnerability and real-life narratives" compared to Breathe In. Breathe Out. (2015). In a review for Exclaim!, Dust Cwaine told everyone to "[e]njoy the Duffaissance", referring to Duff's return, and remarked that the album successfully bridged the gap between her earlier works and her more recent sound.

Olivia Horn of Pitchfork noted Luck... or Something had a hint of nostalgia for 2000s pop music, and believed it retained Duff's signature "charm" while exploring more adult themes. Slant Magazine's Michael Savio complimented the album's musical production, describing it as "familiar and comforting". However, he felt it did not "represent a bold reinvention of Duff as an artist or a person". In a review for Riff, Vera Maksymiuk wrote that the album showed a reflective step forward while highlighting its approach to nostalgia and personal evolution. The A.V. Club highlighted the album's production as its standout feature. However, they also felt Duff's vocal range had limitations. In her review for the Associated Press, Elise Ryan echoed other reviews regarding Luck... or Something invoking feelings of nostalgia, with complimenting its production while criticizing its lyrical content.

== Commercial performance ==
In the United States, Luck... or Something debuted at number three on the Billboard 200, selling approximately 84,000 album-equivalent units in its first week. It gave Duff her sixth top-five entry within the country. However, in its second week the album dropped to number 194 with a 88% decline, selling 10,300 units. The album spent two weeks in total in Billboard 200.

In Australia and Canada, the album debuted at number one, becoming her first chart-topper in former and her fourth in latter. It also reached the top five in Belgium (Flanders), Italy's Physical Albums chart, New Zealand, Scotland, and the United Kingdom, while peaking within the top ten in Belgium (Wallonia), Croatia's International Albums chart, Hungary's Physical Albums chart, and Ireland. Elsewhere, the album charted in the Netherlands, Spain, Italy, Switzerland, and France. Within the United Kingdom, Luck... or Something became the highest-charting album of her career, debuting at number five on the UK Albums Chart and beating her previous chart high of Dignity (2007) at number 25. On July 10, 2026, the album was certified Gold by Music Canada for certified shipments of 40,000 units.

== Track listing ==
Standard edition
No.	Title	Writer(s)	Length
1.	"Weather for Tennis"	Hilary Duff; Matthew Koma; Brian Phillips	3:16
2.	"Roommates"	Duff; Koma; Phillips	2:52
3.	"We Don't Talk"	Duff; Dan Book; Koma	2:47
4.	"Future Tripping"	Duff; Koma; Maya Kurchner; Phillips	3:23
5.	"Growing Up"	Duff; Thomas DeLonge; Mark Hoppus; Koma; Phillips; Scott Raynor	3:02
6.	"The Optimist"	Duff; Zack Kardon; Koma; Phillips	4:12
7.	"You, from the Honeymoon"	Duff; Koma; Phillips	3:33
8.	"Holiday Party"	Duff; Koma; Kurchner; Phillips; Sxssy	3:30
9.	"Mature"	Duff; Koma; Madison Love; Phillips	3:37
10.	"Tell Me That Won't Happen"	Duff; Delacey; Koma; Kurchner; Phillips	3:36
11.	"Adult Size Medium"	Duff; Koma; Phillips	4:01
Total length:			37:49

Limited edition
No.	Title	Writer(s)	Length
12.	"Wake Up" (mine; from Most Wanted, 2005)	Duff; Dead Executives	3:38
13.	"So Yesterday" (mine; from Metamorphosis, 2003)	The Matrix; Charlie Midnight	3:35
14.	"What Dreams Are Made Of" (mine; from The Lizzie McGuire Movie, 2003)	Dean Pitchford; Matthew Wilder	4:00
15.	"Sparks" (mine; from Breathe In. Breathe Out., 2015)	Christian "Bloodshy" Karlsson; Peter Thomas; Tove Lo; Sam Shrieve	3:06
16.	"Come Clean" (mine; from Metamorphosis)	Kara DioGuardi; John Shanks	3:33
17.	"Why Not" (mine; from Metamorphosis)	Midnight; Matthew Gerrard	2:59
18.	"With Love" (mine; from Dignity, 2007)	Duff; DioGuardi; Vada Nobles; Julius Diaz	3:03
Total length:			61:43

Happy Hour edition
No.	Title	Writer(s)	Length
19.	"Mature" (mellow)	Duff; Koma; Love; Phillips	4:01
20.	"Roommates" (mellow)	Duff; Koma; Phillips	3:09
21.	"Weather for Tennis" (mellow)	Duff; Koma; Phillips	3:29
22.	"You, from the Honeymoon" (mellow)	Duff; Koma; Phillips	3:42
23.	"What Dreams Are Made Of" (mine) (music video)	Pitchford; Wilder	3:58
24.	"Mature" (music video)	Duff; Koma; Love; Phillips	3:43
25.	"Roommates" (music video)	Duff; Koma; Phillips	3:11
26.	"Weather for Tennis" (music video)	Duff; Koma; Phillips	3:24
Total length:			90:20

=== Notes ===
- "Growing Up" contains an interpolation of "Dammit" (1997), written and performed by Blink-182.
- The mellow version of "Mature" also appears as a bonus track on the Japanese CD edition of Luck... or Something.

== Credits and personnel ==
Credits were adapted from the liner notes of limited edition and Tidal.

=== Locations ===
- Local Weather; The Valley, CA (recording: all tracks)
- The Wheelhouse; Vancouver, B.C. (mixing: 1–11, 14, 18)
- Periscope Sound; Franklin, TN (mixing: 12–13, 15–17)
- The Hit Lab; Nashville, TN (mastering)

=== Personnel ===
- Hilary Duff – vocals
- Matthew Koma – production, recording
- Brian Phillips – production, recording
- Mitch McCarthy – mixing
- Zach Szydio – immersive mixing
- Nathan Dantzler – mastering
- Harrison Tate – additional mastering
- Allee Fütterer – bass
- Griffin Goldsmith – drums
- Sam Beresford – keyboards
- Cynthia Tolson – strings
- Sam DeRosa – additional vocals on "Roommates"
- Zack Kardon – guitar on "The Optimist"
- Joey Howard – fretless bass on "Mature"

== Charts ==
Chart performance
Chart (2026)	Peak position
Australian Albums (ARIA)	1
Belgian Albums (Ultratop Flanders)	4
Belgian Albums (Ultratop Wallonia)	6
Canadian Albums (Billboard)	1
Croatian International Albums (HDU)	7
Dutch Albums (Album Top 100)	11
French Albums (SNEP)	171
Hungarian Physical Albums (MAHASZ)	8
Irish Albums (Official Charts)	7
Italian Albums (FIMI)	46
Italian Physical Albums (FIMI)	3
New Zealand Albums (RMNZ)	2
Scottish Albums (Official Charts)	2
Spanish Albums (PROMUSICAE)	26
Swiss Albums (Schweizer Hitparade)	74
UK Albums (Official Charts)	5
US Billboard 200	3

== Certifications and sales ==
Certifications and sales
Region	Certification	Certified units/sales
Canada (Music Canada)	Gold	40,000^{‡}
United States	—	73,000
^{‡} Sales+streaming figures based on certification alone.

== Release history ==
Release dates and formats
Region	Date	Format	Edition(s)	Label	Ref.
Various	February 20, 2026	Cassette; CD; digital download; LP; streaming	Standard	Atlantic	
Various	February 20, 2026	LP	Mature; Dirty Martini; Wine O'clock	Atlantic	
Various	February 20, 2026	CD	Physical retail exclusive	Atlantic	
United States	February 23, 2026	Digital download	Happy Hour	Atlantic	
