= Breathe In. Breathe Out. =

Studio album by Hilary Duff
- Released: June 12, 2015
- Recorded: September 2013 – March 2015
- Studios: Dry Snack Sound; Kite Music; Westlake (Los Angeles, California); Record Plant (Hollywood, California); Zenseven (Woodland Hills, California); Sticky (Windlesham, Surrey); Tileyard (London, England); Warner/Chappell; Wolf Cousins (Stockholm, Sweden)
- Genres: Dance-pop; folk-pop
- Length: 42:12
- Label: RCA
- Producers: Micheal Angelo; Christopher J. Baran; Jerrod Bettis; Dan Book; Carl Falk; Toby Gad; Jason Gill; Jake Gosling; Oscar Holter; Ilya; Christian "Bloodshy" Karlsson; KDrew; Ian Kirkpatrick; Matthew Koma; Kristian Lundin; Christian Medice; OzGo; Peter Thomas; Svidden; Emily Wright

Hilary Duff chronology
Best of Hilary Duff (2008)	Breathe In. Breathe Out. (2015)	Luck... or Something (2026)

Singles from Breathe In. Breathe Out.
- 1. "Chasing the Sun" Released: July 29, 2014; 2. "All About You" Released: August 12, 2014; 3. "Sparks" Released: April 7, 2015

Breathe In. Breathe Out. is the fifth studio album by American singer-songwriter Hilary Duff. It was released on June 12, 2015, by RCA Records. Duff initially began work on the album in January 2012, but after scrapping the songs she recorded, she resumed recording in September 2013 and continued throughout 2014 and 2015. After being signed to RCA Records in 2014, she released the singles, "Chasing the Sun" and "All About You". Following their releases, Duff continued recording new material, and in April 2015, she released the album's lead single, "Sparks".

Duff worked with a number of high-profile musicians on the album, with the album having co-writing credits from Ed Sheeran, Tove Lo, and Duff's long time collaborator Kara DioGuardi. Singer-songwriter Kendall Schmidt is featured on the final cut "Night Like This". The album also features writing and production on several tracks by Matthew Koma. Duff promoted Breathe In. Breathe Out. only by appearances on television talk-shows and through radio interviews, and did not tour in support of the album.

Musically, Breathe In. Breathe Out. is a dance-pop record with EDM and folk-pop elements. It received generally positive reviews from music critics, praising the album's production quality and the mix of genres on the record. The album charted within the top 10 in Australia, Canada, and the United States as well as the top 20 in Mexico and Spain.

== Background and production ==
On November 16, 2008, Duff told MTV News at the Total Request Live finale that she would begin working on her fifth studio album in "two weeks". When asked about how the new music would sound, Duff said: "I like so many different kinds of music. Something poppy and catchy — I'm girly but I think I'm kind of tough, so maybe a little rock influence." The plan however never materialized, and Duff went on a long hiatus from music. In January 2012, she announced that she was recording new material with musicians during her pregnancy, such as Jason Evigan and Ali Tamposi, and again in September 2013, including Billy Mann. Early recording sessions for the album consisted of EDM tracks that were later scrapped in favor of songs with a folk-pop feel, as Duff felt that "it wasn't the push that [she] wanted to have out there". Later sessions resulted in the singles "Chasing the Sun" and "All About You', both heavily influenced by the folk-pop and acoustic pop that Duff was aiming for.

By October 2014, she had recorded numerous tracks in which the titles made it online through social media. In 2015, pictures from the scrapped album's photoshoot leaked online via Twitter. Duff remarked that she "really wanted some of those super strong pop songs that Sweden really seems to have their finger on right now". Some of the folk-influenced tracks originally intended for the album before the change in direction, namely "Tattoo", "Brave Heart", and "Belong", managed to make it on to the album despite the change.

=== Artistic direction ===
Duff described the change in the album's musical direction in an interview with MTV in 2015, stating that "the album is a range of stuff", noting that it was initially "pretty heavy" when she began writing, drawing from the previous year of her life. She added that the material later "changed", reflecting her view that she was not "this super heavy girl", but rather "one for the sunshine", and said the overall tone shifted accordingly and "feels a lot better" to her. A track titled "This Heart", which was about her son, was going to be on the album, however, it finally scrapped from the final cut.

Duff said regarding the album's lyrical content that she wanted listeners to feel as though they were getting a "glimpse" into her life and who she is, describing herself as a "normal girl" who has lived a "not-so-normal life". She suggested that her fans have remained with her because they can "relate" to her, and expressed a desire for them to feel a sense of closeness, as if they could "go out and have a fun night together". She also noted that while her "heart has been broken", it is "not the end of the world", emphasizing that "life goes on", and added that she wants listeners to feel that she is "there for them", that she "cares", and that she wants them to feel "happy".

== Release and title ==
In July 2014, Duff announced that she had signed a recording contract with RCA Records, and that she would finish and release her then-untitled fifth studio album in between filming of her new television show, Younger; she planned to do small promotion for the album during its period, but revealed that she would not begin a "full press push" until filming of the show wrapped on December 12. The track "Outlaw" was first used in the ninth episode of the Younger and was later made available on the Fanjoy edition as well as Japanese edition of Breathe In. Breathe Out. She announced in late August that the album would not be released in October as originally planned, and that fans would have to wait a "few more months" for it to be released.

Duff announced the title of the album and revealed its cover artwork on May 13, 2015. Prior to the release of the title and artwork, she announced that fans would have the opportunity to pre-order the album and have their name printed in a special edition of the album's booklet. She mailed several fans who had been among the first to pre-order the album white balloons that have the album artwork printed on it. The packages also included a handwritten note from Duff about the album.

Breathe In. Breathe Out. is named after a song that Duff recorded with Matthew Koma, which according to Duff, "stuck with [her]" throughout the recording process of the album. She further explained that over the past few years, the act of taking a "deep breath in" and letting it out had been something that helped her, describing it as both a "good thing" and at times a "struggle" or a source of "power". She characterized it as a simple reminder and a form of "relief".

== Composition ==
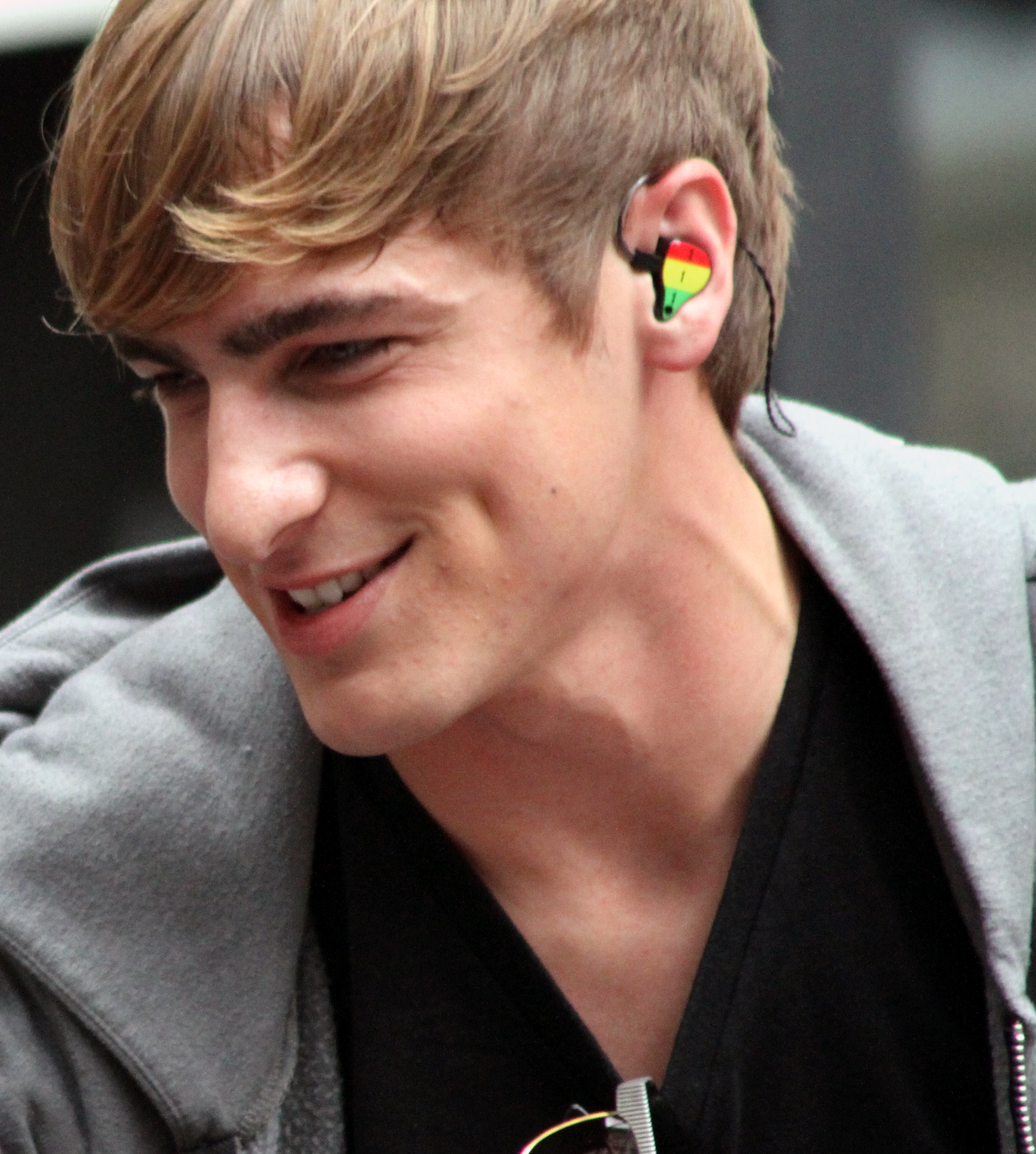
Kendall Schmidt (pictured) sings with Duff on the track "Night Like This".

In an interview with MTV, Duff described the Tove Lo-penned track "One in a Million" as a "'f-- you' anthem about a guy who's not treating you right". She also said that "Tattoo", written by Ed Sheeran, is "a beautiful song about a relationship ending and what it leaves behind".

Duff explained that a number of songs, written early in the process, were ultimately left off the album, as she wanted the project to function as a "feel-good" record for her fans. "Picture This" was described as a "sexy" song about obsession driven by physical chemistry, with the relationship understood as not lasting forever. The album's final track, "Night Like This", a duet with former Big Time Rush member Kendall Schmidt, was written and described by Duff as the song about "being stuck in a cab in New York with someone".

== Promotion ==
According to Duff, she was disappointed that she never got a chance to "properly promote" the singles "Chasing the Sun" and "All About You", but that their releases gave her "a little taste of it again" after "being out of the music game for seven years". During the week of the album's release, the singer made several appearances on Good Morning America, Live! with Kelly and Michael and The View. In 2015, she was scheduled to perform at a number of events, however, many of them were cancelled, along with a scheduled performance in the Macy's Thanksgiving Day Parade.

Duff released two videos at her official Vevo page, in the two months following the album's release. The first was an acoustic performance of "Tattoo", released on June 18 and recorded live in her backyard. She told E! during January 2016 that there was no tour for the album.

== Singles ==
Duff found the process of choosing her "comeback" single to be "really tough". According to Duff, it was a close tie between "All About You", "Chasing the Sun", and "Tattoo". "Chasing the Sun" was eventually selected, being released as digital download in the United States on July 29, 2014. Less than a month after of its release, Duff announced that she would release a next single, "All About You". In the United States, it was digitally released on August 12, and was sent to contemporary hit radio on August 26. They are only included in the Japanese and Fanjoy editions of the album, as the bonus tracks.

On April 7, 2015, Duff released "Sparks" as the lead single from the album. Originally, Duff released a video for it on May 14 that featured her dancing while simultaneously chronicling her experiences on Tinder dates. On May 28, a "fan-demanded version" of the video was released in which the Tinder portions were cut.

== Critical reception ==
Professional ratings
Review scores
Source	Rating
AllMusic	3.5/5 stars
Knoxnews	3/5 stars
The Music	2/5 stars
MusicOMH	3/4 stars
The Star	7/10

Breathe In. Breathe Out. was met with positive reviews from music critics.

Nolan Feeney of Time magazine called the album "mindless pop fun", while also stating that it "splits the difference between contemporary club-bangers and mid-2000s pop that's aged better than Duff or anybody else could have imagined." Yasmeen Gharn of Nylon magazine gave a positive review of the album, noting that the album was "a natural evolution from her last musical work, Dignity." She praised Duff for not following the folk-pop direction that was first explored with "Chasing The Sun". Yasmeen criticized the lyrics of the album for being "cheesy at times" and "filled with nonsensical metaphors" but called the songs "relatable and catchy."

HitFix's Katie Hasty provided a mixed review, describing the songs as "generic pop plods" but classifying the album as a whole as a "unconscious pleasure." Chester Chin, in his review for The Star newspaper, said at its best, the album "presents sleek pop bangers with brief folksy flirtations that expertly toe the line between sexy and sophisticated". Spin listed the album at number 25 on its year-end list of The 25 Best Pop Albums of 2015.

=== Year-end lists ===
Publication	List	Rank	Ref.
Spin	25 Best Pop Albums of 2015	25	

== Commercial performance ==
Breathe In. Breathe Out. debuted at number five on the US Billboard 200 chart, selling 39,000 copies in its first week, marking her fifth top five album on the chart. Critics deemed the position as impressive, considering it was her first release in eight years. However, the album marks Duff's first studio release not to receive any certification from RIAA. Breathe In. Breathe Out. also suffered a drop from number 5 to number 65 in its second week, leaving the chart in its fourth week of release. In Australia, the album had a higher spot, debuting at number four on the ARIA charts, whereas in Canada, it debuted at number five. The record achieved moderate success elsewhere, scoring top 20 positions in Mexico and Spain.

== Track listing ==
Breathe In. Breathe Out. — standard edition
No.	Title	Writer(s)	Producer(s)	Length
1.	"Sparks"	Christian "Bloodshy" Karlsson; Peter Thomas; Ebba Tove Elsa Nilsson; Sam Shrieve	Thomas; Bloodshy; Svidden^{[a]}; Emily Wright^{[b]}	3:05
2.	"My Kind"	Jason Gill; Elina Stridh	Gill	3:27
3.	"One in a Million"	Nilsson; Oscar Görres; Ilya	Ilya; OzGo	3:45
4.	"Confetti"	Matthew Koma; Kevin Nicholas Drew; Richard W. Nowels; Ellen Shipley	KDrew; Koma	3:49
5.	"Breathe In. Breathe Out."	Koma; Dan Book	Koma; Book	3:33
6.	"Lies"	Hilary Duff; Oscar Holter; Albin Nedler; Kristoffer Fogelmark	Holter; Wright^{[b]}	3:36
7.	"Arms Around a Memory"	Koma	Koma; KDrew; Book^{[c]}	3:16
8.	"Stay in Love"	Micheal Angelo; Nilsson	Angelo; Gill^{[b]}	3:33
9.	"Brave Heart"	Duff; Jerrod Bettis; Sean Douglas	Bettis	3:33
10.	"Tattoo"	Ed Sheeran; Jake Gosling; Chris Leonard	Gosling	3:28
11.	"Picture This"	Duff; Mitchy Collins; Christian Medice	Medice	3:21
12.	"Night Like This" (featuring Kendall Schmidt)	Duff; Ian Kirkpatrick; Lindy Robbins	Kirkpatrick	3:46
Total length:				42:12

Breathe In. Breathe Out. — Fanjoy edition (bonus downloads)
No.	Title	Writer(s)	Producer(s)	Length
1.	"Chasing the Sun"	Colbie Caillat; Jason Reeves; Gad	Gad; Josh Cumbee^{[b]}	2:42
2.	"All About You"	Duff; Savan Kotecha; Kristian Lundin; Carl Falk	Falk; Lundin	2:42
3.	"Outlaw"	Duff; Kirkpatrick; Robbins	Kirkpatrick	3:04
4.	"Chasing the Sun" (Dave Audé remix)	Caillat; Reeves; Gad	Gad; Cumbee^{[b]}; Audé^{[d]}	3:41
Total length:				12:09

Breathe In. Breathe Out. — Target, international deluxe edition, and 2023 LP edition
No.	Title	Writer(s)	Producer(s)	Length
13.	"Belong"	Sam Watters; Edwin "Lil Eddie" Serrano; Mike Einziger; Toby Gad	Gad	3:35
14.	"Rebel Hearts"	Duff; Christopher J. Baran; Audra Mae; Skyler Stonestreet; Kara DioGuardi	CJ Baran	3:19
Total length:				49:06

Breathe In. Breathe Out. — Japanese edition and 2022 digital deluxe reissue
No.	Title	Writer(s)	Producer(s)	Length
15.	"Chasing the Sun"	Caillat; Reeves; Gad	Gad; Cumbee^{[b]}	2:42
16.	"All About You"	Duff; Kotecha; Lundin; Falk	Falk; Lundin	2:42
17.	"Outlaw"	Duff; Kirkpatrick; Robbins	Kirkpatrick	3:04
Total length:				57:34

=== Notes ===
- ^{^a} signifies a co-producer.
- ^{^b} signifies a vocal producer.
- ^{^c} signifies an additional producer.
- ^{^d} signifies a remixer.
- "Confetti" contains an interpolation of the song "Heaven Is a Place on Earth" by Belinda Carlisle, written by Richard W. Nowels and Ellen Shipley.

== Charts ==
=== Weekly charts ===
Chart (2015)	Peak position
Australian Albums (ARIA)	4
Belgian Albums (Ultratop Flanders)	156
Belgian Albums (Ultratop Wallonia)	200
Canadian Albums (Billboard)	5
Irish Albums (IRMA)	77
Italian Albums (FIMI)	78
Japanese Albums (Oricon)	190
Mexican Albums (Top 100 Mexico)	17
New Zealand Albums (RMNZ)	29
Scottish Albums (Official Charts)	82
South Korean Albums (Circle)	55
Spanish Albums (Promusicae)	19
UK Albums (Official Charts)	91
US Billboard 200	5

=== Monthly charts ===
Chart (2015)	Peak position
South Korean International Albums (Gaon)	56

== Release history ==
List of release dates
Region	Date	Edition(s)	Format(s)	Label(s)	Ref.
Denmark	June 12, 2015	Standard; deluxe	CD	Sony Music	
Germany	June 12, 2015	Deluxe	Digital download	Sony Music	
Netherlands	June 12, 2015	Standard; deluxe	Digital download	Sony Music	
Sweden	June 12, 2015	Standard; deluxe	CD	Sony Music	
France	June 15, 2015	Standard; deluxe	Digital download	Sony Music	
Canada	June 16, 2015	Deluxe	CD	Sony Music	
Brazil	June 16, 2015	Deluxe	Digital download	Sony Music	
Italy	June 16, 2015	Deluxe	Digital download	Sony Music	
New Zealand	June 16, 2015	Standard	CD	Sony Music	
Poland	June 16, 2015	Standard; deluxe	CD	Sony Music	
Spain	June 16, 2015	Standard	CD	Sony Music	
United States	June 16, 2015	Standard	Digital download	RCA	
United States	June 16, 2015	Standard; deluxe	CD	RCA	^{[d]}
Spain	June 17, 2015	Standard; deluxe	Digital download	Sony Music	
Australia	June 19, 2015	Deluxe	CD	Sony Music	
Germany	June 19, 2015	Deluxe	CD	Sony Music	
United Kingdom	June 22, 2015	Deluxe	CD; digital download	RCA	
Italy	June 23, 2015	Deluxe	CD	Sony Music	
Mexico	June 26, 2015	Deluxe	CD	Sony Music	
Brazil	August 4, 2015	Deluxe	CD	Sony Music	
Japan	August 5, 2015	Japan	CD	Sony Music	
Worldwide	October 7, 2022	Japan	Digital download; streaming	RCA	
United States	April 28, 2023	Deluxe	LP	Sony	^{[e]}

=== Notes ===
- ^{^a} In the United States, the deluxe edition of Breathe In. Breathe Out. was exclusive to Target stores, and subsequently the two bonus tracks were not included on the fanjoy edition.
- ^{^e} Urban Outfitters exclusive opaque apple red vinyl, limited to just 3000 copies.
