= All About You (Hilary Duff song) =

Single by Hilary Duff

from the album Breathe In. Breathe Out. (Note: Only included on the Japanese edition and 2022 digital reissue)
- Released: August 12, 2014
- Studio: Conway Recording Studios (Los Angeles, CA); Kinglet Studios (Stockholm, Sweden)
- Genre: Folk pop; pop rock
- Length: 2:42
- Label: RCA
- Songwriters: Hilary Duff; Savan Kotecha; Kristian Lundin; Carl Falk
- Producers: Falk; Lundin

Hilary Duff singles chronology
"Chasing the Sun" (2014)	"All About You" (2014)	"Sparks" (2015)

Music video
- "All About You" on YouTube

"All About You" is a song recorded by American singer Hilary Duff for her fifth studio album, Breathe In. Breathe Out. (2015). It was released on August 12, 2014 by RCA Records. Written by Duff, Kristian Lundin, Savan Kotecha, and Carl Falk, "All About You" is a folk pop and pop rock song, having a banjo, handclaps, and a "heavy hand" drum as the song's instrumentation. Lyrically, the song talks about how the protagonist is so hooked on her boyfriend that she is willing to prove her true love for him anywhere.

Critics praised the "All About You" for its instrumentation and catchiness, and found similarities between it and songs from Taylor Swift and The Lumineers. The song was a success in Australia, where it managed to reach the top 20 and was certified gold. Elsewhere, it had less impact, failing to enter the Billboard Hot 100 but managing to chart on the Bubbling Under Hot 100 Singles and Top 40 Mainstream charts.

The official music video for the song was directed by Declan Whitebloom and chronicles the singer chasing a male love interest she meets at a diner, intertwined with footage of Duff performing choreography with her dancers. Duff also released a lyric video for the song which features a succession of extreme close-ups of Duff. The track was promoted through live performances on The X Factor (Australia), Good Morning America, and Live with Kelly & Michael.

== Background and release ==
After spending six years without releasing new music, Hilary Duff announced she was recording her upcoming new album. "I'm working with a lot of people. I'm still writing, so that process is still going on," she told MTV News during the 2014 iHeartRadio Music Awards red carpet. She also described the album as an "earthy, indie-pop vibe" and that a new single was going to be out "soon". On July 29, 2014, Duff released "Chasing the Sun". The song received mostly favorable reviews from music critics, and debuted at number 79 on the Billboard Hot 100 chart. However, less than a month after the release of "Chasing the Sun", Duff announced that she would release a new single called "All About You" on August 11, 2014. Additionally, she tweeted out the cover art for the song, featuring Duff "looking boho chic in a black hat, low-cut black dress, capelet and lots of silver rings", as described by Jocelyn Vena from Billboard. It appeared as track 18 on Now That's What I Call Music! 52 released on October 27, 2014.

== Composition ==
"All About You" is a folk pop and pop rock song. The song was written by Duff, Kristian Lundin, Savan Kotecha and Carl Falk. Its instrumentation consists of a banjo, handclaps, and the "heavy hand" of a drum, which according to Carolyn Menyes of Music Times, results in the song sounding like "a big ol' stomping party". Seventeen magazine's Kristin Harris found the song to sound like a mix of Taylor Swift, The Lumineers, and "old-school Hilary". Emily Blake of MTV News echoed the same thought, writing that the guitar-driven track starts out like a Lumineers or Mumford & Sons joint but noticing that it "builds into something far more peppy, poppy and, well, Hilary Duff."

Lyrically, "All About You" incorporates romantic innuendos, with Duff talking about how hooked she is on her boyfriend, and she is willing to prove her true love for him by "turning the lights down" and going to action. "Think you're all about me / But I'm all about you," she sings. "Turn the lights down let me show you it's true / Get a lot of taste what I'm into." For Emily Blake, the song is about "that honeymoon-phase kind of love — the kind of feeling when you're addicted to thinking about someone new." Lucas Villa of AXS noted that "lyrically and vocally, Hilary shows a more mature side to herself on 'All About You'."

== Critical response ==
The song received universal acclaim from music critics. According to Nolan Feeney of Time magazine, "All About You" is in the "same twangy folk-pop vein" as "Chasing the Sun", but that it is a "huge improvement", writing that "All About You" has the "kind of rowdy punch" that is required to get a comeback "really cooking". He wrote that while comparisons to Taylor Swift are inevitable, Duff's "nod to her Texan roots" is "attention-grabbing" and effortless. Feeney concluded that "the world should have heard this one first". Jason Lipshutz of Billboard praised the song, naming it "a no-nonsense pop tour de force," [with] the folk undertones, handclaps, shout-along chorus and deliriously enjoyable melodies [that] make this the winning comeback bid that Duff fans were hoping to hear when she announced her return to music."

Carolyn Menyes of Music Times praised Duff's voice for "wander[ing] into its own territory, playing against the music and making an irresistible combination." Menyes also praised the "sing along 'Hey baby baby' refrain in the pre-chorus," noting that "it's nearly impossible not to at least bop your head to the powerful chorus." Lucas Villa of AXS pointed out that the song "certainly sounds like it could be Hilary's next big hit," while Mike Wass of Idolator classified the song as "the kind of sassy, sing-a-long summer anthem we've been expecting from the pop deity who brought us classics like 'So Yesterday' and 'Come Clean'." Michelle McGahan of Pop Crush was complimentary with the folk-rock tone for "add[ing] a rich depth and maturity to Duff's sound [...] that is only enhanced by the slightly provocative lyrics."

== Chart performance ==
In Australia, "All About You" made its debut on the ARIA Charts at number 21, during the week of September 21, 2014. It later climbed to number 20, becoming Duff's first top-twenty hit in nine years in the country, with the last being "Beat of My Heart" (2005). It was certified gold by the Australian Recording Industry Association for shipments of 35,000 copies, becoming her first certified single there in ten years. Elsewhere, the song received little impact on the charts, reaching number 91 on the Canadian Hot 100 chart, lower than her previous single, "Chasing the Sun", and failing to debut on the US Billboard Hot 100 chart, though it did reach number 19 on the Bubbling Under Hot 100 Singles extension. It fared better on some Billboard component charts, including the Pop Songs, where it has reached number 38.

== Music video ==
=== Lyric video ===
On August 19, 2014, Duff released a lyric video for "All About You" on YouTube. The lyric video features a succession of extreme close-ups of Duff belting the lyrics appearing to be in the nude, while also having dancing embers and subtle flashes of orbs, as noted by Marc Inocencio from Ryan Seacrest.com. Bradley Stern of Idolator praised the lyric video for showing a sexy side of Duff, and she herself was praised for "actually appearing in the song's lyric video." Mandi Salemo of Pop Crush complimented the lyric video, calling it "a cute, flirtatious vid that Hilary looks gorgeous in (of course), and it makes us even more excited to see what the actual music video will be like."

=== Official video ===
Duff wrote on her Twitter account on 4 September that she was filming the single's music video, which was directed by Declan Whitebloom. On September 18, 2014, Duff posted a picture on her Twitter account in which she said the video was going to be released on September 24. She also revealed that the video was going to have choreography, telling MTV News: "The choreography was actually pretty easy, but it was a lot of rehearsals and I wanted to be so particular because I'm not, like, a dancer and I didn't want to be, like, super-sexy time dancing, I wanted something different about it that was more me.

== Live performances ==
Duff performed "All About You" live for the first time on The X Factor Australia on September 8, 2014. The following day, Duff presented an acoustic version of the single on Take 40 Australia. She also performed the song on Australian television talkshow Sunrise on September 11, 2014. Duff sang the song for the first time, on live television in the US, on Good Morning America on October 7, 2014 and on Live! With Kelly and Michael on October 8, 2014.

== Credits and personnel ==
- Songwriting – Hilary Duff, Kristian Lundin, Savan Kotecha, Carl Falk
- Production – Kristian Lundin, Carl Falk
- Guitar – Carl Falk
- Engineering – Cory Bice, John Hanes
- Mixing – Serban Ghenea

Credits adapted from Qobuz.com

== Charts ==
Chart (2014)	Peak position
Australia (ARIA)	20
Canada Hot 100 (Billboard)	91
Czech Republic Singles Digital (ČNS IFPI)	60
Mexico Ingles Airplay (Billboard)	27
Slovakia Singles Digital (ČNS IFPI)	69
US Bubbling Under Hot 100 (Billboard)	19
US Pop Airplay (Billboard)	38

== Certifications ==
Region	Certification	Certified units/sales
Australia (ARIA)	Gold	35,000^{^}
^{^} Shipments figures based on certification alone.

== Release history ==
Country	Date	Format	Label
United States	August 12, 2014	Digital download	RCA
Austria	August 13, 2014	Digital download	Sony
Belgium	August 13, 2014	Digital download	Sony
France	August 13, 2014	Digital download	Sony
Germany	August 13, 2014	Digital download	Sony
Italy	August 13, 2014	Digital download	Sony
Spain	August 13, 2014	Digital download	Sony
Switzerland	August 13, 2014	Digital download	Sony
Russia	August 25, 2014	Contemporary hit radio	Sony
United States	August 26, 2014	Contemporary hit radio	RCA
Japan	October 22, 2014	Digital download	Sony
United Kingdom	July 6, 2015	Digital download	RCA
