= Mature (song) =

2025 single by Hilary Duff

Single by Hilary Duff

from the album Luck... or Something
- Released: November 6, 2025
- Genre: Pop rock; guitar-pop
- Length: 3:37
- Label: Sugarmouse; Atlantic
- Songwriters: Hilary Duff; Matthew Koma; Madison Love; Brian Phillips
- Producers: Brian Phillips; Matthew Koma

Hilary Duff singles chronology
"Never Let You Go" (2020)	"Mature" (2025)	"Roommates" (2026)

Music video
- "Mature" on YouTube

"Mature" is a song by the American singer Hilary Duff. It was released on November 6, 2025, by Sugarmouse Inc. and Atlantic Records as the lead single from her sixth studio album, Luck... or Something (2026). She and Madison Love co-wrote the song with its producers Matthew Koma and Brian Phillips. Its lyrics reference Duff's regret for dating an older man.

== Development and release ==
On September 9, 2025, Atlantic Records announced they had signed Hilary Duff to their label, which led to a 400% increase in searches for her discography through Swedish streaming service Spotify. While attending an event for fashion magazine Vogue on October 26, she revealed that her fans would "hear something so soon, like in the blink of an eye."

Duff relaunched her official website under Atlantic Records on November 2, which featured a countdown clock set to end the next day at 1:00 p.m. (EST). The countdown revealed that she would be releasing "Mature". She also debuted the cover art through social media, with the caption stating, "So happy this is finally yours to hear. Been keeping this one quiet too long."

Duff released "Mature" on November 6, 2025, worldwide digitally for music download and streaming, (Note: Duff gave an exclusive license for "Mature" and was distributed through music company Atlantic Recording Corporation.) with a music video premiering the same day. Its release marked nearly a decade since she had released solo music following the 2016 song "Little Lies". On December 19, 2025, an official remix by British DJ Joel Corry was released.

== Composition ==
A pop, pop rock and guitar-pop song, "Mature" runs for three minutes and 37 seconds, containing a "guitar forward production" and "glimmering synths and guitar licks". Duff and her husband Matthew Koma co wrote-the song with Madison Love and Brian Phillips. The song's lyrics reference Duff's past dating an older man, singing the lyrics "She looks like all of your girls but blonder/A little like me, but younger". E! contributor Leah DeGrazia commented on the lyrical content of the single's first verse, referring to it as "NSFW".

== Commercial performance ==
In the United States, "Mature" reached number 4 on the Bubbling Under Hot 100 chart. It also debuted at number seven on the Billboard Digital Song Sales chart, marking Duff's fifth entry on the chart and her second-highest peak to date following the number four position reached by "Wake Up" in 2005. In Canada, the song peaked at 57 on the Canadian Hot 100 and at 35 on the CHR Airplay chart.

"Mature" became Duff's first entry on the Official Singles Sales chart in the United Kingdom, debuting at number 39. It also entered the Official Singles Downloads chart at number 34, marking her third career appearance on the list following "Wake Up" and "With Love", both of which previously reached the top 40. "Mature" also became her highest-peaking entry on the Downloads ranking, surpassing the number 35 peak of "Wake Up" in 2005. Its debut ends an 18-year absence for Duff on the downloads-only chart, where she last appeared in 2007 with "With Love".

== Critical reception ==
The song was considered among the best of the album tracks, praising the lyrics and the consciousness of Duff about her life. Keaton Bell of Vogue called the track "a perfect point of re-entry, pushing Duff's sound in new directions while still feeling quintessentially Hilary." Reviewing the album for The Arts Desk, Ellie Roberts praised the song alongside "Roommates", writing that both "reintroduced the familiar all American pop rock sound that Duff is so deeply associated with, but both with clear modern influences and slightly more vulnerable themes".

Danielle Long of PureWow praised the song's balance between the past and present, noting that "Musically, 'Mature' gives classic Hilary vibes, shimmering pop with a confident edge, but the lyrics are deeper, more reflective and, well, mature." Long stated that the track reflects on Duff's younger self and a past relationship with a significant age gap. Calling the song a "pop masterclass in self-awareness," Danielle Holian of Atwood Magazine asserted that Duff's "vocal delivery has matured without losing the playful, approachable charm that has always defined her." Holian praised the track's masterful balance, noting it manages to make "introspection sound effortlessly catchy," and concluded that the finished product is "pop with depth, self-awareness with shimmer."

Billboard ranked the song at number 20 on its list of "The 100 Best Songs of 2025: Staff Picks." In its review, the publication described the track as "appropriately cutting and therapeutic," highlighting Duff's lyrical perspective of addressing her younger self rather than an ex-partner. The staff also praised the song's guitar-driven pop sound, comparing its "windows-down guitar-pop groove" to the style that helped popularize artists such as Carly Rae Jepsen, while noting Duff's personal lyrical details, including an unexpected reference to "Strawberry Letter 23". The review concluded that the song helped build anticipation for Duff's forthcoming musical comeback in 2026. Young Entertainment ranked "Mature" among its Top 5 Songs of 2025, describing the single as a reflection on personal growth with strong pop appeal. Pitchfork, praised the song, calling it "luck…’s high mark."

== Music video ==
An accompanying music video for "Mature" was released through video sharing platform YouTube, which premiered at 8:00 p.m. EST on November 6, 2025. It was directed by Lauren Dunn and features Duff in an empty theater watching herself perform onstage. A brief reference to her studio album Metamorphosis (2003) is made in the video. Duff described the concept of the video as "meeting yourself where you landed".

== Personnel ==
Credits were adapted from Tidal.

- Hilary Duff – vocals, songwriter
- Matthew Koma – producer, songwriter, recording
- Brian Phillips – producer, songwriter, recording
- Madison Love – songwriter
- Nathan Dantzler – mastering
- Harrison Tate – additional mastering
- Mitch McCarthy – mixing
- Sam Beresford – keyboards
- Allee Fütterer – bass
- Griffin Goldsmith – drums
- Joey Howard – fretless bass guitar
- Cynthia Tolson – strings

== Charts ==
Chart performance
Chart (2025–2026)	Peak position
Argentina Anglo Airplay (Monitor Latino)	6
Bolivia Anglo Airplay (Monitor Latino)	5
Canada Hot 100 (Billboard)	57
Central America Anglo Airplay (Monitor Latino)	14
Costa Rica Anglo Airplay (Monitor Latino)	7
Dominican Republic Anglo Airplay (Monitor Latino)	20
Guatemala Anglo Airplay (Monitor Latino)	10
Japan Hot Overseas (Billboard Japan)	17
New Zealand Hot Singles (RMNZ)	15
Panama Anglo Airplay (Monitor Latino)	10
UK Singles Sales (OCC)	39
UK Singles Downloads (OCC)	34
US Bubbling Under Hot 100 (Billboard)	4
US Adult Contemporary (Billboard)	28
US Adult Pop Airplay (Billboard)	13
US Digital Song Sales (Billboard)	7

== Release history ==
Release dates and formats for "Mature"
Region	Date	Format(s)	Version	Label	Ref.
Various	November 6, 2025	Digital download; streaming	Original	Sugarmouse; Atlantic	
Italy	November 11, 2025	Radio airplay	Original	Warner	
Various	December 19, 2025	Digital download; streaming	Joel Corry remix	Sugarmouse; Atlantic	
