= Chasing the Sun (Hilary Duff song) =

Single by Hilary Duff

from the album Breathe In. Breathe Out. (Note: Only included on the Japanese edition and 2022 digital reissue)
- Released: July 29, 2014
- Recorded: April 24, 2014
- Studio: Kite Music Studios (Los Angeles, CA)
- Genre: Bubblegum pop; folk-pop
- Length: 2:42
- Label: RCA
- Songwriters: Colbie Caillat; Jason Reeves; Toby Gad
- Producer: Toby Gad

Hilary Duff singles chronology
"Reach Out" (2008)	"Chasing the Sun" (2014)	"All About You" (2014)

Music video
- "Chasing the Sun" on YouTube

"Chasing the Sun" is a song recorded by American singer Hilary Duff for her fifth studio album, Breathe In. Breathe Out. (2015). It was written by Colbie Caillat, Jason Reeves, and Toby Gad, the latter of whom also produced the track. It was Duff's first single release under her new recording contract with RCA Records. Undecided between "Tattoo", "All About You" and "Chasing the Sun" as her first single with RCA, Duff and the label eventually chose the latter as the first single, describing it as a "top-down, carefree, super catchy singalong song". The song is featured in a March of Dimes public service announcement.

== Critical reception ==
"Chasing the Sun"
A 16-second sample of "Chasing the Sun" by Hilary Duff, where the chorus is heard.

The song received mostly positive reviews from music critics. Jason Scott at PopDust praised the song for "show[ing] a more mature side to the singer, without completely abandoning her roots." Michelle McGahan of PopCrush likewise appreciated the song's sonic references to the era that made Hilary Duff a star: "We love the retro feel of the tune, which totally takes us back to the late '90s/early 2000s with its bubblegum sound." Jeff Benjamin of the music network Fuse gave the single a more mixed review, in which he praised the arrangement and "feel-good" vibe but was less impressed with Duff's singing. "It's not the vocal performance of a lifetime," writes Benjamin, "but it is that same peppy singer so many kids fell in love with hearing on TV everyday in the early '00s."

Vulture writer Lindsey Weber was more critical in her brief review. Describing the song as sounding "like Paris Hilton doing Sheryl Crow karaoke," Weber found "Chasing the Sun" to be an unsatisfying comeback and wrote that she "hope[s] there's more to come." Carolyn Menyes at Music Times was complimentary of the song musically but also questioned the song's viability as a vehicle for Duff's return to pop stardom saying "[If] Duff is expecting to move forward in her career, she's going to have to stop looking back and make music with a little more edge." VH1 writer Christopher Rosa said "'Chasing the Sun' swaps the bubblegum kitsch of 'Metamorphosis' (2003) and nightclub naughtiness of 2007's 'Dignity' for a softer acoustic sound," but that the song "still honors Duff's knack for summery pop froth."

== Music video ==
Duff shot the music video in Malibu on July 11, 2014. The official music video debuted on Vevo on July 29, 2014. It shows Duff as a frustrated office worker who dreams of being on the beach with another man, played by actor Daniel Sobieray. Eventually, she begins to re-enact her dreams in real life, causing havoc between the other office workers. After a freak accident that almost leads to her throwing a hamster ball with the hamster in it, she ends up being fired and takes her stuff back home. Lucas Villa of AXS complimented the video's theme, writing, "[k]nowing that most of her demographic has moved on from classrooms to entry level jobs, [Duff] smartly plays with an office daydreaming scenario."

== Chart performance ==
The song debuted on the Billboard Hot 100 chart of August 16, 2014, at number 79. It is also her first entry on the Hot 100 since 2007's “Stranger”.

== Charts ==
Chart (2014)	Peak position
Australia (ARIA)	72
Canada Hot 100 (Billboard)	59
France (SNEP)	197
Spain (Promusicae)	46
US Billboard Hot 100	79

== Release history ==
Country	Date	Format	Label
Austria	July 29, 2014	Digital download	Sony
Belgium	July 29, 2014	Digital download	Sony
France	July 29, 2014	Digital download	Sony
Germany	July 29, 2014	Digital download	Sony
Italy	July 29, 2014	Digital download	Sony
Spain	July 29, 2014	Digital download	Sony
Switzerland	July 29, 2014	Digital download	Sony
United States	July 29, 2014	Digital download	RCA
Italy	July 30, 2014	Contemporary hit radio	Sony
Russia	August 19, 2014	Contemporary hit radio	Sony
Japan	August 27, 2014	Digital download	Sony
United Kingdom	June 22, 2015	Digital download	RCA
