= Kaiser Chiefs discography =

Discography of British rock band Kaiser Chiefs

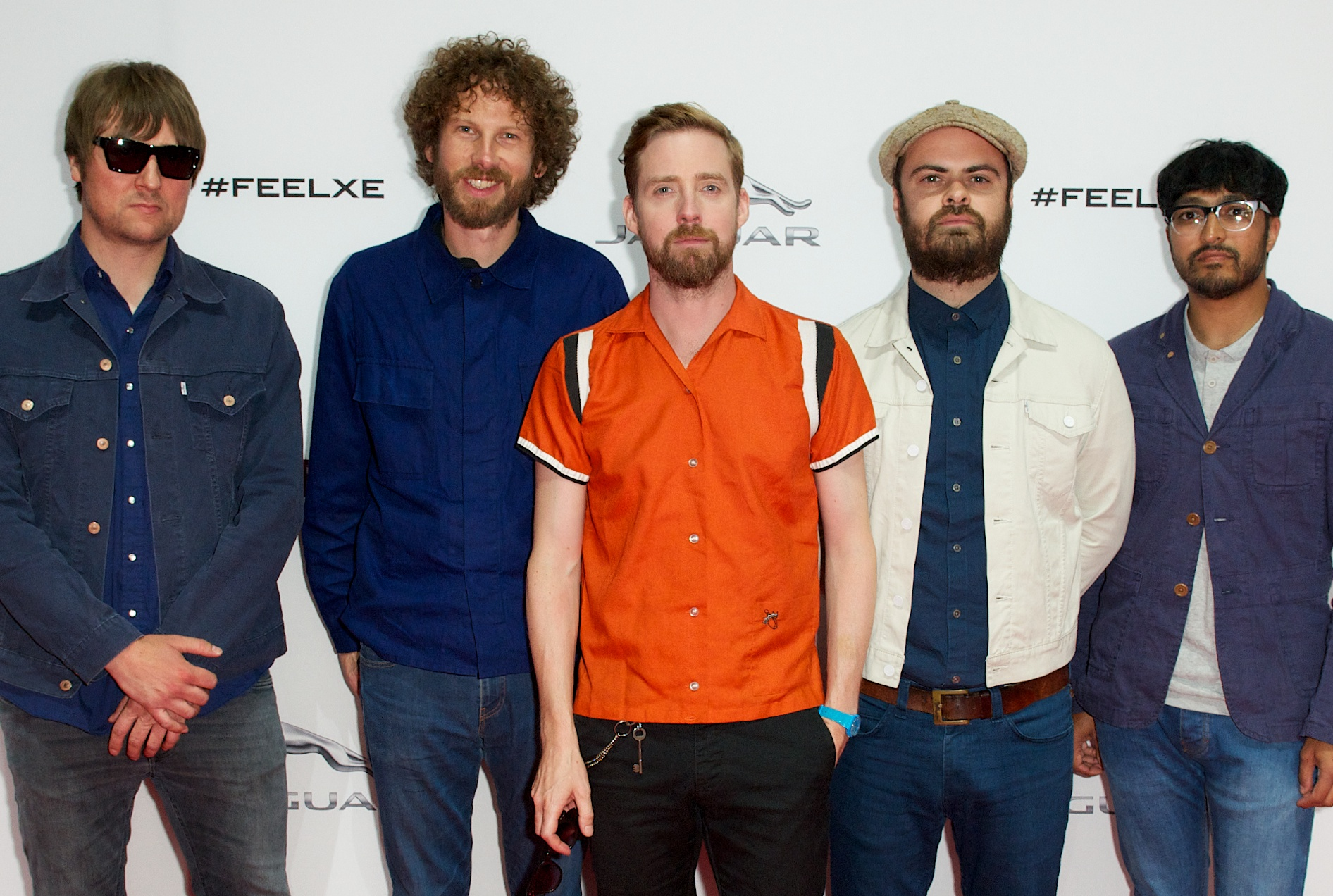
- The Kaiser Chiefs in 2014
- Studio albums: 8
- Extended plays: 1
- Singles: 33
- Video albums: 2
- Music videos: 27
- Other appearances: 2

The discography of the Kaiser Chiefs, a British indie rock band, consists of eight studio albums, one extended play, thirty-three singles, and one video album. the Kaiser Chiefs were formed in 1996 in Leeds, England by classmates Nick Hodgson (drums), Nick Baines (keyboards) and Simon Rix (bass). The trio were later joined by Andrew White (guitar) and Ricky Wilson (vocals). Hodgson left the band in 2012 and was replaced by Vijay Mistry (formerly of fellow Leeds band and opening act Club Smith) the following year.

The band's debut album Employment was released in March 2005. Influenced by the new wave and punk rock of the late 1970s, the record enjoyed success in the United Kingdom with sales of over 2 million. The album reached number three on the UK Albums Chart in 2005, then it reclimbed the charts a year later to reach number two and certified five times platinum by the British Phonographic Industry (BPI). It produced four singles, and was shortlisted for the Mercury Prize in 2005 and nominated for "Best British Album" at the 2006 BRIT Awards. Also in 2005, the band released Enjoyment, a video album composed of music videos, live performances and interviews.

The band's second album, Yours Truly, Angry Mob, was released in February 2007. It reached number one and was certified platinum in the UK, and peaked at number forty-five in the Billboard 200 albums chart in the United States. Yours Truly, Angry Mob produced four singles, two of which reached the top twenty on the UK Singles Chart. In April 2008, the album's lead single, "Ruby", was nominated for an Ivor Novello Award for "Most Performed Title of 2007–2008". Kaiser Chiefs released their third album, Off with Their Heads, in October 2008. It reached number two in the UK, and produced two singles. In 2014, Kaiser Chiefs released their 5th album, Education, Education, Education & War. On 31 March 2014, it reached number 1 on the UK Albums Chart, marking their first number 1 since Yours Truly, Angry Mob.

== Albums ==
=== Studio albums ===
Title	Album details	Peak chart positions										Sales	Certifications (sales thresholds)
Title	Album details	UK	AUS	BEL (FL)	BEL (WA)	GER	IRL	NLD	SCO	SWI	US	Sales	Certifications (sales thresholds)
Employment	Released: 7 March 2005; Label: B-Unique (BUN #093); Formats: CD, digital download, LP	2	60	19	88	55	2	12	2	—	86	UK: 2,079,224 (Note: Sales as of October 2011); US: 179,000 (Note: Sales as of October 2011)	BPI: 7× Platinum; ARIA: Gold; BRMA: Gold; IRMA: 3× Platinum; NVPI: Gold
Yours Truly, Angry Mob	Released: 21 February 2007; Label: B-Unique (BUN #122); Formats: CD, CD/DVD, digital download, LP	1	9	2	30	6	2	1	1	11	45	UK: 887,000 (Note: Sales as of October 2011)	BPI: 2× Platinum; ARIA: Gold; BRMA: Gold; IRMA: Platinum
Off with Their Heads	Released: 20 October 2008; Label: B-Unique (BUN #144); Formats: CD, digital download, LP	2	12	11	36	29	16	16	5	19	55	UK: 295,000 (Note: Sales as of October 2011)	BPI: Gold
The Future Is Medieval	Released: 3 June 2011; Label: Polydor, Universal; Formats: CD, digital download, LP	10	25	34	37	—	107	40	17	83	—		
Education, Education, Education & War	Released: 31 March 2014; Label: Fiction, Universal; Formats: CD, digital download, LP	1	65	33	40	39	62	37	1	76	— (Note: Education, Education, Education & War did not enter the US Billboard 200, but peaked at number 161 on the US Current Album Sales Chart.)		BPI: Gold
Stay Together	Released: 7 October 2016; Label: Caroline; Formats: CD, digital download, LP	4	—	89	105	—	—	109	4	88	—		
Duck	Released: 26 July 2019; Label: Polydor; Formats: CD, digital download, LP, CS	3	—	90	152	—	—	—	3	40	—		
Kaiser Chiefs' Easy Eighth Album	Released: 1 March 2024; Label: V2; Formats: CD, digital download, LP	6	—	—	—	—	—	—	6	—	—		
"—" denotes releases that did not chart or were not released in that country.

=== US-only albums ===
Title	Album details
Start the Revolution Without Me	Released: 6 March 2012; Label: Downtown/Fiction/Co-Op; Formats: CD, digital download

=== Compilation albums ===
Title	Album details	Peak chart positions					Certifications (sales thresholds)
Title	Album details	UK	AUS	BEL (FL)	BEL (WL)	SCO	Certifications (sales thresholds)
Souvenir: The Singles 2004–2012	Released: 4 June 2012; Label:	19	81	92	86	27	BPI: Gold

== Extended plays ==
Title	EP details
Lap of Honour	Released: 18 January 2005; Label: Universal (UICU #1102); Format: CD; Released in Japan only

== Singles ==
Title	Year	Peak chart positions										Certifications (sales thresholds)	Album
Title	Year	UK	AUS	BEL (FL)	CZR	EUR	GER	IRL	NLD	SCO	US Alt	Certifications (sales thresholds)	Album
"Oh My God"	2004	6	—	— (Note: "Oh My God" did not enter the Ultratop 50, but peaked at number 21 on the Flemish Back Catalogue Singles chart.)	—	—	—	27	82	5	—	BPI: Silver	Employment
"I Predict a Riot"	2004	9	96	— (Note: "I Predict a Riot" did not enter the Flanders Ultratop 50, but peaked at number 17 on the Ultratip chart.)	—	20	79	25	74	15	34	BPI: 3× Platinum	Employment
"Everyday I Love You Less and Less"	2005	10	92	— (Note: "Everyday I Love You Less and Less" did not enter the Ultratop 50, but peaked at number 19 on the Flemish Back Catalogue Singles chart.)	—	—	—	—	52	9	—	BPI: Platinum	Employment
"Modern Way"	2005	11	—	—	—	—	—	47	89	12	—	BPI: Silver	Employment
"You Can Have It All" (Note: "You Can Have It All" was released as collector's edition 7-inch single)	2005	—	—	—	—	—	—	—	—	—	—		Employment
"Ruby"	2007	1	11	5	1	1	11	5	7	1	14	BPI: 3× Platinum; BRMA: Gold	Yours Truly, Angry Mob
"Everything Is Average Nowadays"	2007	19	—	— (Note: "Everything Is Average Nowadays" did not enter the Flanders Ultratop 50, but peaked at number 17 on the Ultratip chart.)	32	—	99	—	91	16	—		Yours Truly, Angry Mob
"The Angry Mob"	2007	22	—	—	—	—	—	—	—	10	—		Yours Truly, Angry Mob
"Love's Not a Competition (But I'm Winning) (Note: "Love's Not a Competition (But I'm Winning)" was released as collector's edition 7-inch single)	2007	112	—	— (Note: "Love's Not a Competition (But I'm Winning)" did not enter the Flanders Ultratop 50, but peaked at number 10 on the Ultratip chart.)	100	—	—	—	— (Note: "Love's Not a Competition (But I'm Winning)" did not enter the Netherlands Singles Chart but peaked on the Dutch Tipparade Chart at number 11.)	—	—		Yours Truly, Angry Mob
"Never Miss a Beat"	2008	5	47	42	33	8	76	49	74	7	—	BPI: Gold	Off with Their Heads
"Good Days Bad Days"	2008	111	— (Note: "Good Days Bad Days" did not enter the Australian Singles Chart but peaked at number 20 on the ARIA Hitseekers Chart.)	— (Note: "Good Days Bad Days" did not enter the Flanders Ultratop 50, but peaked at number 21 on the Ultratip chart.)	—	—	—	—	—	33	—		Off with Their Heads
"Little Shocks"	2011	179	—	— (Note: "Little Shocks" did not enter the Flanders Ultratop 50, but peaked at number 13 on the Ultratip chart.)	—	—	—	—	—	—	—		The Future Is Medieval
"Man on Mars"	2011	—	—	— (Note: "Man on Mars" did not enter the Flanders Ultratop 50, but peaked at number 46 on the Ultratip chart.)	—	—	—	—	—	—	—		The Future Is Medieval
"Kinda Girl You Are"	2011	—	—	—	—	—	—	—	—	—	—		The Future Is Medieval
"On the Run"	2012	—	—	—	—	—	—	—	—	—	—		Start the Revolution Without Me
"Listen to Your Head"	2012	—	—	—	—	—	—	—	—	—	—		Souvenir: The Singles 2004–2012
"Bows & Arrows"	2014	—	—	—	—	—	—	—	—	—	—		Education, Education, Education & War
"Coming Home"	2014	31	—	— (Note: "Coming Home" did not enter the Flanders Ultratop 50, but peaked at number 10 on the Ultratip chart.)	—	—	80	89	—	31	—		Education, Education, Education & War
"Meanwhile Up in Heaven"	2014	—	—	—	—	—	—	—	—	—	—		Education, Education, Education & War
"Ruffians on Parade"	2014	—	—	— (Note: "Ruffians on Parade" did not enter the Flanders Ultratop 50, but peaked at number 17 on the Ultratip chart.)	—	—	—	—	—	—	—		Education, Education, Education & War
"My Life"	2014	—	—	—	—	—	—	—	—	—	—		Education, Education, Education & War
"Falling Awake"	2015	—	—	—	—	—	—	—	—	—	—		non-album single
"Parachute"	2016	— (Note: "Parachute" did not enter the UK Singles Chart, but peaked at number 95 on the UK Singles Sales Chart.)	—	— (Note: "Parachute" did not enter the Flanders Ultratop Top 50, but charted as an extra tip on the Ultratop Bubbling Under chart.)	—	—	—	—	—	100	—		Stay Together
"Hole in My Soul"	2016	— (Note: "Hole in My Soul" did not enter the UK Singles Chart, but peaked at number 97 on the UK Singles Sales Chart.)	—	—	—	—	—	—	—	82	—		Stay Together
"We Stay Together"	2016	—	—	—	—	—	—	—	—	—	—		Stay Together
"Record Collection"	2019	—	—	— (Note: "Record Collection" did not enter the Flanders Ultratop Top 50, but charted as an extra tip on the Ultratop Bubbling Under chart.)	—	—	—	—	—	—	—		Duck
"People Know How to Love One Another"	2019	—	—	—	—	—	—	—	—	—	—		Duck
"Zombie Prom"	2020	—	—	—	—	—	—	—	—	—	—		non-album single
"How 2 Dance"	2022	—	—	—	—	—	—	—	— (Note: "How 2 Dance" did not enter the Netherlands' Single Top 100 but peaked on the Netherlands' Airplay Chart at number 25.)	—	—		Kaiser Chiefs' Easy Eighth Album
"Jealousy"	2023	—	—	—	—	—	—	—	—	—	—		Kaiser Chiefs' Easy Eighth Album
"Feeling Alright"	2023	—	—	—	—	—	—	—	—	—	—		Kaiser Chiefs' Easy Eighth Album
"Burning in Flames"	2024	—	—	—	—	—	—	—	—	—	—		Kaiser Chiefs' Easy Eighth Album
"Beautiful Girl"	2024	—	—	—	—	—	—	—	—	—	—		Kaiser Chiefs' Easy Eighth Album
"—" denotes releases that did not chart or were not released in that country. "×" denotes periods where charts did not exist or were not archived

== Other charting songs ==
Title	Year	Peak chart positions			Album
Title	Year	UK	BEL (FL) Tip	NLD Tip	Album
"Sink That Ship"	2005	59	—	—	"I Predict a Riot" single
"Heat Dies Down"	2007	—	—	12	Yours Truly, Angry Mob
"How Do You Feel About That"	2008	151	—	—	"Never Miss a Beat" single
"Sooner or Later"	2008	140	—	—	"Never Miss a Beat" single
"When All Is Quiet"	2011	—	50	—	The Future Is Medieval
"—" denotes releases that did not chart or were not released in that country.

== Video albums ==
Title	Video details
Enjoyment	Released: 28 November 2005; Label: B-Unique (BUN #101 DVD); Format: DVD
Live at Elland Road	Released: 24 November 2008; Label: Polydor (#1790878); Format: DVD

== Music videos ==
Year	Title	Director(s)
2004	"Oh My God" (Version 1)	Charlie Paul
2004	"I Predict a Riot" (Version 1)	Charlie Paul
2005	"Oh My God" (Version 2)	Charlie Paul
2005	"Everyday I Love You Less and Less"	Tim Pope
2005	"I Predict a Riot" (Version 2)	StyleWar
2005	"Modern Way"	Scott Lyon and Ricky Wilson
2007	"Ruby"	StyleWar
2007	"Everything Is Average Nowadays"	StyleWar
2007	"The Angry Mob"	W.I.Z.
2007	"Love's Not a Competition (But I'm Winning)"	Jim Canty
2008	"Never Miss a Beat"	Goodtimes
2008	"Good Days Bad Days"	Alex Courtes
2009	"You Want History"	Tim Blackwell
2011	"Little Shocks"	Jamie Roberts
2011	"Man on Mars"	Sara Dunlop
2011	"Kinda Girl You Are"	Dan Sully
2012	"On the Run"	
2012	"Listen to Your Head"	Mattias Erik Johansson
2014	"Coming Home"	James Slater
2014	"Meanwhile Up in Heaven"	James Slater
2014	"My Life"	James Slater
2015	"Falling Awake"	Danny North
2016	"Parachute"	Ed Sayers
2016	"Hole in My Soul"	Ed Sayers
2019	"Record Collection"	
2019	"People Know How to Love One Another"	Rob Flowers

=== Other appearances ===
List of appearances in other artists' music videos
Year	Title	Artists	Role	Director(s)
2007	"Oh My God" (Note: Cover of band's own song)	Mark Ronson featuring Lily Allen	Themselves (cameo)	Nima Nourizadeh

== B-sides ==
Year	Song	Featured On	Notes
2008	"Acting Up"	Good Days Bad Days	
2008	"Addicted to Drugs (Appendix 1)"	Good Days Bad Days	
2007	"Admire You"	Ruby	
2007	"The Angry Mob (Paul Emanuel "Off The Streets" Mix)"	The Angry Mob	Limited edition 7-inch vinyl only. No digital version has been released.
2005	"Another Number"	Everyday I Love You Less and Less	Cover of song by The Cribs, also released on a split 7-inch vinyl single.
2004	"Born to Be a Dancer (Original Version)"	Oh My God (Initial Release)	Demo version released by Drowned in Sound. Later released on the reissue of Oh My God by B-Unique.
2005	"Brightest Star"	Oh My God	7-inch vinyl only. No digital version has been released.
2004	"Caroline Yes (Original Version)"	Oh My God (Initial Release)	Demo version released by Drowned in Sound
2014	"Coming Home (Instrumental)"	Coming Home	Promo CD only.
2005	"Everyday I Love You Less and Less (Boyz Noize Mix)"	I Predict a Riot/Sink That Ship	
2007	"Everything Is Average Nowadays"	Love's Not a Competition (But I'm Winning)	Limited edition 7-inch vinyl, and promo releases only. Performed by The Little Ones.
2015	"Falling Awake (Instrumental)"	Falling Awake	Promo CD only.
2007	"From the Neck Down"	Ruby	Also included on the US edition of "Yours Truly, Angry Mob"
2008	"Good Days Bad Days (Calvin Harris Remix)"	Good Days Bad Days	Digital download only.
2005	"Hard Times Send Me"	Oh My God	Later included on the "Oh My God"" European EP. Also included on "Lap of Honour EP" in Japan.
2008	"How Do You Feel About That?"	Never Miss a Beat	
2007	"I Like to Fight"	Everything Is Average Nowadays	Also included on the US edition of "Yours Truly, Angry Mob"
2005	"It Ain't Easy (Demo)"	Modern Way	
2005	"Less Is More"	I Predict a Riot/Sink That Ship	
2005	"The Letter Song"	Everyday I Love You Less and Less	7-inch vinyl only. No digital version has been released.
2014	"Meanwhile Up in Heaven (Instrumental)"	Meanwhile Up in Heaven	Promo CD only.
2005	"Moon"	Modern Way	
2014	"My Life (Instrumental)"	My Life	Promo CD only.
2006	"Na Na Na Na Naa (Polysics Remix)"	Lap of Honour	
2008	"Never Miss a Beat (Run Hide Survive Mix)"	Never Miss a Beat	Digital download only.
2005	"Not Surprised"	Everyday I Love You Less and Less	Also included on "Lap of Honour EP" in Japan.
2004	"Oh My God (Original Version)"	Oh My God (Initial Release)	Demo version released by Drowned in Sound
2007	"Out of My Depth"	Everything Is Average Nowadays	
2005	"People Need Light"	Modern Way	
2005	"Run Again"	Modern Way	7-inch vinyl only. No digital version has been released.
2005	"Seventeen Cups"	Everyday I Love You Less and Less	Also included on "Lap of Honour EP" in Japan.
2005	"Sink That Ship"	I Predict a Riot/Sink That Ship	Also included on "Lap of Honour EP" in Japan.
2008	"Sooner or Later"	Never Miss a Beat	
2007	"Telling Me to Go"	The Angry Mob	
2005	"Think About You (And I Like It)"	Oh My God	Later included on the "Oh My God"" European EP. Also included on "Lap of Honour EP" in Japan.
2004	"Take My Temperature"	I Predict a Riot	Later included on the "Oh My God"" European EP. Also included on the Japanese edition of Employment.
2004	"Wrecking Ball"	I Predict a Riot	Later included on the "Oh My God"" European EP. Also included on the Japanese edition of Employment.
2005	"You Can Have It All (Light Orchestral)"	Modern Way	7-inch vinyl only. Only released digitally as a cd promo.

== Other appearances ==
These songs have not appeared on a studio album released by Kaiser Chiefs.

Year	Song	Album	Notes
2005	"I Heard It Through the Grapevine"	Help!: A Day in the Life	Originally recorded by Smokey Robinson & the Miracles
2007	"Flowers in the Rain"	Radio 1 Established 1967	Originally recorded by The Move
2007	"Getting Better"	N/A	In 2007, Kaiser Chiefs re-recorded The Beatles song for 'It Was 40 Years Ago Today', a BBC television film with contemporary acts recording songs from 'Sgt. Pepper's Lonely Hearts Club Band' using the same studio, technicians and recording techniques as the original.
2012	"Pinball Wizard"	A Symphony of British Music	Originally recorded by The Who. Recording and performed during the Closing Ceremony of the London 2012 Olympic Games.
