= Souvenir: The Singles 2004–2012 =

Greatest hits album by Kaiser Chiefs
- Released: 4 June 2012
- Recorded: 2004–2012
- Genre: Indie rock
- Length: 58:03

Kaiser Chiefs chronology
Start the Revolution Without Me (2012)	Souvenir: The Singles 2004–2012 (2012)	Education, Education, Education & War (2014)

Singles from Souvenir: The Singles 2004–2012
- 1. "Listen to Your Head" Released: 1 May 2012

Souvenir: The Singles 2004–2012 is a compilation album by the English indie rock band Kaiser Chiefs. The album features almost all of the singles of note released by the band from 2004 to 2012 (minus "Sink That Ship", a double A-Side), as well as a new track titled "Listen to Your Head" (which would be the band's last single with original drummer Nick Hodgson before his departure from the band in December 2012) and the previously unreleased "On The Run". It was released in the UK on 4 June 2012. The version of 'You Can Have It All' on this compilation is the 'light orchestral' version previously only available on the song's exclusive 7-inch single, despite not being labelled as such on the packaging.

The album art was created by Hitchin-based photo-realist artist Sarah Graham, using oil paints.

== Track listing ==
No.	Title	Length
1.	"Oh My God" (from Employment, 2005)	3:35
2.	"Ruby" (from Yours Truly, Angry Mob, 2007)	3:23
3.	"I Predict a Riot" (from Employment, 2005)	3:52
4.	"Never Miss a Beat" (from Off with Their Heads, 2008)	3:08
5.	"Everything Is Average Nowadays" (from Yours Truly, Angry Mob, 2007)	2:44
6.	"The Angry Mob" (from Yours Truly, Angry Mob, 2007)	4:47
7.	"Listen to Your Head" (Previously unreleased)	4:06
8.	"Everyday I Love You Less and Less" (from Employment, 2005)	3:37
9.	"Little Shocks" (from The Future Is Medieval, 2011)	3:42
10.	"Love's Not a Competition (But I'm Winning)" (from Yours Truly, Angry Mob, 2007)	3:17
11.	"Good Days Bad Days" (from Off with Their Heads, 2008)	2:58
12.	"On the Run" (from Start the Revolution Without Me, 2012)	4:08
13.	"You Can Have It All ('Light Orchestral' Version)" (from Employment, 2005)	4:21
14.	"Modern Way" (from Employment, 2005)	4:01
15.	"Man on Mars (Edit)" (from The Future Is Medieval, 2011)	3:48
16.	"Kinda Girl You Are" (from The Future Is Medieval, 2011)	2:36

iTunes deluxe edition
No.	Title	Length
17.	"Starts With Nothing (Live, BBC Radio 1 Live Lounge, 2011)"	5:52
18.	"Ruby (Live at V Festival, 2008)"	3:19
19.	"Love's Not a Competition (But I'm Winning) [Live from Elland Road, 2008]"	3:00
20.	"Oh My God (Live from Electric Proms, 2008)"	3:44
