= Education, Education, Education & War =

Studio album by Kaiser Chiefs
- Released: 31 March 2014
- Recorded: 2013
- Studios: The Maze Studio, Atlanta
- Genre: Rock
- Length: 45:59
- Labels: Fiction, B-Unique, Caroline, ATO
- Producer: Ben H. Allen III

Kaiser Chiefs chronology
Souvenir: The Singles 2004–2012 (2012)	Education, Education, Education & War (2014)	Stay Together (2016)

Singles from Education, Education, Education & War
- 1. "Coming Home" Released: 14 February 2014; 2. "Meanwhile Up in Heaven" Released: 8 April 2014; 3. "My Life" Released: 17 June 2014

Education, Education, Education & War is the fifth studio album by English rock band Kaiser Chiefs, released on 31 March 2014 through Fiction Records, B-Unique Records, Caroline Records and ATO Records. It was produced by Ben H. Allen III, and is the first Kaiser Chiefs album recorded with new drummer Vijay Mistry, formerly of fellow Leeds band and opening act Club Smith. The album's name is partly a reference to a line in a famous 1996 speech by Tony Blair where he emphasised the importance of education, and partly referencing the controversial Iraqi war in which he involved the UK.

== Production and release ==
Education, Education, Education & War is the first album featuring the new Kaiser Chiefs drummer, Vijay Mistry, formerly of Club Smith, after Nick Hodgson left the group in December 2012. Three songs were co-written with Fraser T. Smith (known for his work with Adele and Sam Smith) and the album was produced by Ben H. Allen III (who has previously worked with Gnarls Barkley, Animal Collective, and Deerhunter), and recorded at The Maze Studio in Atlanta. It was mixed by Michael Brauer (My Morning Jacket, Coldplay) at Electric Lady Studios in New York City in November 2013.

The album was released in the United Kingdom on 31 March 2014 through Fiction Records/Caroline International/Universal Music as a standard CD, LP (with a bonus 7" single), and digital download. In the United States, it was released on 1 April 2014 through ATO Records. On 6 January 2014, the album became available for pre-order on iTunes, with a free download of the song "Bows & Arrows".

== Promotion ==
On 5 December 2013, Kaiser Chiefs released a song titled "Misery Company" onto their SoundCloud account. The song had previously been performed live during the band's 2013 summer tour.

On 3 January 2014, "Bows & Arrows" premiered on Rolling Stone magazine's website, and on 6 January 2014, the song was released as a single in France. According to singer Ricky Wilson, it was recorded in a studio under a McDonald's restaurant in Islington, and bassist Simon Rix came up with its title. Wilson said:

I liked the idea that bows and arrows are pretty useless on their own but when you get them together, they can be quite formidable. A bit like us lot, really. I love being in a band. It's daft to think you can do it alone. It's about not being afraid of emotion. It can be the strongest weapon we have. What's wrong with a load of blokes admitting they need each other? [It's] a sliver of hope through all the futility and loss on the record. You can also dance to it.

On 13 February 2014, the first single for the album was released, titled "Coming Home" in the UK.

On 19 March 2014, Kaiser Chiefs released a 15-minute video on YouTube which contained 1:30-long clips of each of the ten songs off the album.

On 26 May 2014, the second single, "Meanwhile Up in Heaven", was released in the UK.

On 24 June 2014, the third single, titled "My Life", was released in the UK.

== Critical reception ==
Professional ratings
Aggregate scores
Source	Rating
Metacritic	59/100
Review scores
Source	Rating
Aesthetic Magazine	2/5 stars
AllMusic	3.5/5 stars
Alternative Press	3.5/5 stars
Clash	5/10
Consequence of Sound	C
The Guardian	2/5 stars
Mojo	3/5 stars
musicOMH	3/5 stars
PopMatters	6/10 stars
Rolling Stone	3.5/5 stars

Education, Education, Education & War received mixed reviews from music critics. At Metacritic, which assigns a normalized rating out of 100 to reviews from mainstream critics, the album received an average score of 59/100 ("mixed or average reviews"), based on nineteen reviews.

At Alternative Press, Robert Ham rated the album three-and-a-half stars out of five, stating that the release "is a raging success" and writing that "Not everything hits the mark, but there is enough to delight in and offer plenty of hope for the Chiefs' future." Ross Bennett of Mojo rated the album 3 stars out of 5, remarking that the release "finds them in defiant form."

== Track listing ==
No.	Title	Writer(s)	Length
1.	"The Factory Gates"	Nick Baines, Simon Rix, Fraser T. Smith, Andrew White, Ricky Wilson	3:32
2.	"Coming Home"	Baines, Rix, White, Wilson	4:51
3.	"Misery Company"	Baines, Petraglia, Rix, White, Wilson	5:13
4.	"Ruffians on Parade"	Baines, Rix, T Smith, White, Wilson	3:35
5.	"Meanwhile Up in Heaven"	Baines, Rix, White, Richard Wilkinson, Wilson	5:12
6.	"One More Last Song"	Baines, Rix, White, Wilkinson, Wilson	4:05
7.	"My Life"	Baines, Ben H. Allen III, Marcus Killian, Rix, White, Wilson	5:08
8.	"Bows & Arrows"	Baines, Rix, White, Wilkinson, Wilson	3:43
9.	"Cannons"	Baines, Rix, T Smith, White, Wilson	6:02
10.	"Roses"	Baines, Allen, Rix, White, Wilson	4:38

Limited Edition Bonus Tracks
No.	Title	Writer(s)	Length
11.	"Song for Stephanie"	Baines, Rix, Fraser T. Smith, White, Wilson	4:21
12.	"The Nerve"		3:21
13.	"Coming Home" (Radio Edit)		4:10
14.	"Misery Company" (Radio Edit)

Japanese Edition Bonus Tracks
No.	Title	Writer(s)	Length
11.	"Song for Stephanie"	Baines, Rix, Fraser T. Smith, White, Wilson	4:21
12.	"Nerve"		3:21

== Personnel ==
Kaiser Chiefs

- Ricky Wilson – lead vocals, percussion
- Andrew "Whitey" White – guitar, backing vocals
- Simon Rix – bass guitar, backing vocals
- Nick "Peanut" Baines – keyboards
- Vijay Mistry – drums, percussion

Technical personnel

- Ben H. Allen III – production, programming
- Michael H. Brauer – mixing
- Gavin Bush – engineering, mixing
- Jason Kingsland – engineering
- Sumner Jones – engineering
- Mark Bengtson – mixing assistant, Pro-Tools
- Richard Wilkinson – additional production
- Joe LaPorta – mastering

Additional musicians and performers

- Ben H. Allen III – acoustic guitar, organ, percussion, synthesizer, background vocals
- Bill Nighy – narrator (track 9)

Additional personnel

- Cally – art direction, design, production
- Ross Neil – drawing
- James Sandom – management
- Mick Webster – management
- Jessica Lord – assistant
- Nadia Shukri – assistant

== Charts ==
=== Weekly charts ===
Chart (2014)	Peak position
Belgian Albums (Ultratop Flanders)	33
Belgian Albums (Ultratop Wallonia)	40
Dutch Albums (Album Top 100)	37
French Albums (SNEP)	154
German Albums (Offizielle Top 100)	39
Scottish Albums (Official Charts)	1
Swiss Albums (Schweizer Hitparade)	76
UK Albums (Official Charts)	1

=== Year-end charts ===
Chart (2014)	Position
UK Albums (OCC)	64

== Release history ==
Region	Date	Label	Format(s)
United Kingdom	31 March 2014	Fiction/Caroline International Universal Music	CD, LP, digital download
United States	1 April 2014	ATO	CD, LP, digital download
