= The Angry Mob =

Single by Kaiser Chiefs

from the album Yours Truly, Angry Mob
- B-side: "Telling Me To Go"
- Released: 20 August 2007
- Recorded: Autumn 2006
- Studio: Hook End Studio, Oxfordshire
- Genre: Indie rock
- Length: 4:47
- Label: B-Unique
- Songwriters: Nick Hodgson, Ricky Wilson, Simon Rix, Andrew White, Nick Baines
- Producer: Stephen Street

Kaiser Chiefs singles chronology
"Everything Is Average Nowadays" (2007)	"The Angry Mob" (2007)	"Love's Not a Competition (But I'm Winning)" (2007)

Music video
- "The Angry Mob" on YouTube

"The Angry Mob" is a song by English indie band Kaiser Chiefs and is the title track to their second album, Yours Truly, Angry Mob. The name "The Angry Mob" is also the name of the band's fanclub and is possibly the inspiration for the band's blog. The song was released in the UK as the third single from Yours Truly, Angry Mob on 20 August 2007. The song discusses the way in which the media encourage knee-jerk reactionary thinking, and the idea that society at large keeps people under control via the tabloids and 24-hour drinking culture.

The single came with special artwork created by Dandy/Beano artist Nigel Parkinson, and features caricatures of the band with various Beano characters. A limited 7" single containing an exclusive Beano poster, was only available through the Kaiser Chiefs website.

Despite only reaching #22 in the UK Singles Chart (the lowest peaking single by the band since the original release of "I Predict a Riot"), it has received significant airplay on contemporary radio stations.

== Music video ==
The video was first shown at 23:00 on 23 July 2007 on Channel 4. It depicts the working-class hen-night culture and culminates in two separate hen parties coming together in a "gang war" style fight after they have been banned from a high-class restaurant 'NOBLESSE' at the request of the upper middle-class diners. The diners gather at the window to enjoy the spectacle of the two groups that have turned on each other, however the hens then decide to unite to confront the diners instead. The video was directed by W.I.Z.

== Track listings ==
All songs were written by Nick Hodgson, Ricky Wilson, Simon Rix, Andrew White, and Nick Baines.

=== CD ===
No.	Title	Length
1.	"The Angry Mob"	4:46
2.	"Telling Me To Go"	3:08

=== 7" vinyl picture disc, single sided, limited edition ===
No.	Title	Length
1.	"The Angry Mob"	4:46

=== 7" vinyl, special limited edition ===
Side one
No.	Title	Length
1.	"The Angry Mob"	4:46

Side two
No.	Title	Length
1.	"The Angry Mob" (The Paul Emanuel "Off The Streets" remix)	3:53

== Chart performance ==
Chart (2007)	Peak position
UK Singles Chart	22
Eurochart Hot 100 Singles	68
