= Enjoyment (video) =

Video by Kaiser Chiefs
- Released: 28 November 2005
- Recorded: Various film sets
- Genre: Indie rock
- Length: 206:00 (approx.)
- Label: B-Unique
- Director: Dick Carruthers

Kaiser Chiefs chronology
Employment (2005)	Enjoyment (2005)	Yours Truly, Angry Mob (2007)

Enjoyment is the follow-up DVD release to English indie band Kaiser Chiefs' highly successful debut album Employment, released on November 28, 2005.

The main focus of the DVD is an approximately 90 minute documentary directed by Walpole-based artist Cally Callomon (who is responsible for much of the band's artwork), with an unusual narration by Bill Nighy and over an hour of live footage shot from various points in the band's career, ranging from their time as indie band Parva to the 2005 tour of Employment.

Fitting with the documentary theme of the DVD, there are segments between the footage featuring interviews with the supposedly younger and older selves of the band members.

Besides the documentary, the DVD also includes all the band's music videos up to 2005's "Modern Way", plus footage from their live performances at summer festivals (including Glastonbury) and access to the official Kaiser Chiefs website.

== Contents ==
- Enjoyment (main feature)
- Live at The Filmore, San Francisco:
  - "Na Na Na Na Naa"
  - "Saturday Night"
  - "Everyday I Love You Less and Less"
  - "Born to Be a Dancer"
  - "I Predict a Riot"
  - "You Can Have It All"
  - "Hard Times Send Me"
  - "Modern Way"
  - "Oh My God"
  - "Time Honoured Tradition"
  - "Caroline, Yes"
  - "Take My Temperature"
- Live at The Cockpit, Leeds:
  - "Na Na Na Na Naa"
  - "I Predict a Riot"
  - "Born to Be a Dancer"
  - "Modern Way"
  - "Sink That Ship" (first ever live performance of this track)
- Live at Glastonbury 2005:
  - "I Predict a Riot"
- Live at V Festival 2005:
  - "Oh My God"
  - "Take My Temperature"
- Music videos:
  - "I Predict a Riot" (2005 version; original video found in documentary)
  - "Oh My God"
  - "Everyday I Love You Less and Less"
  - "Modern Way"
  - "Na Na Na Na Naa" (band video)
- The Culture Show appearance, March 2005
