= Love's Not a Competition (But I'm Winning) =

Single by Kaiser Chiefs

from the album Yours Truly, Angry Mob
- Released: 12 November 2007
- Recorded: Autumn 2006
- Studio: Hook End Studio, Oxfordshire
- Genre: Indie rock
- Length: 3:17
- Label: B-Unique
- Songwriters: Ricky Wilson, Andrew White, Simon Rix, Nick Baines, and Nick Hodgson
- Producer: Stephen Street

Kaiser Chiefs singles chronology
"The Angry Mob" (2007)	"Love's Not a Competition (But I'm Winning)" (2007)	"Never Miss a Beat" (2008)

Music video
- "Love's Not a Competition (But I'm Winning)" on YouTube

"Love's Not a Competition (But I'm Winning)" is a song by English rock band Kaiser Chiefs, featured on the band's second studio album, Yours Truly, Angry Mob. It was released as a collector's edition 7" only single on 12 November 2007, with The Little Ones' cover of "Everything Is Average Nowadays" as a B-side.

Chris Moyles has a running gag on his show, where Comedy Dave has likened the song to a-ha's "The Living Daylights".

The song's music video was directed by Jim Canty. It was filmed in September 2007 at Columbus Circle in New York City.

The song was covered by American rock band Paramore on Radio 1's Live Lounge on 1 February 2008.

At the time it was the band's lowest charting single, reflecting that it was released as the fourth single from the highly successful Yours Truly, Angry Mob and it was only a limited release. It peaked at #112 in the UK Singles Chart.

== Track listing ==
7":

1. Kaiser Chiefs – "Love's Not a Competition (But I'm Winning)" – 3:17
2. The Little Ones – "Everything is Average Nowadays" (Kaiser Chiefs Cover)
