= Everything Is Average Nowadays =

Single by Kaiser Chiefs

from the album Yours Truly, Angry Mob
- B-side: "I Like to Fight", "Out of My Depth"
- Released: 21 May 2007
- Recorded: Autumn 2006
- Studio: Hook End Studio, Oxfordshire
- Genre: Indie rock, power pop
- Length: 2:44
- Label: B-Unique
- Songwriters: Ricky Wilson, Andrew White, Simon Rix, Nick Baines, and Nick Hodgson
- Producer: Stephen Street

Kaiser Chiefs singles chronology
"Ruby" (2007)	"Everything Is Average Nowadays" (2007)	"The Angry Mob" (2007)

Music video
- "Everything Is Average Nowadays" on YouTube

"Everything Is Average Nowadays" is a song by English rock band Kaiser Chiefs and is the ninth track on their second album, Yours Truly, Angry Mob. The song was released as the second single from that album in the United Kingdom on 21 May 2007 (see 2007 in British music).

A live version of the song recorded in Berlin during the band's tour there in November 2006 was released in the United States on 13 March 2007 as part of a promotional disc offered at Best Buy stores.

Both the CD and 7" formats of the single were issued at a limited run, and was deleted one week after its release.

The song has been covered by American band The Little Ones, which is available on a 7" single with the Kaiser Chiefs' "Love's Not a Competition (But I'm Winning)".

== Music video ==
A music video was released for the song, concurrently with its single release, and was directed by the Swedish production company Stylewar (having previously worked with the band on the second music video for "I Predict a Riot" and the video for "Ruby"). A review by Nick Rowan for Leeds Music Scene assesses its plot as "contain[ing] a sequence where a production line manufactures a series of replicas, from vodka bottles and fine art through to punks and cheerleaders, culminating in the mass cloning of each member of the Chiefs. Rather than just the intended commentary on the fact that identity is becoming an off-the-peg purchase and casual plagiarism is ubiquitous, the scene is also a reminder that the Kaisers are fast becoming an inferior facsimile of their earlier selves".

== Track listing ==
- 7" BUN125-7
1. "Everything Is Average Nowadays"
2. "I Like to Fight"
  - This song can also be found as a bonus track on the Japanese edition of "Yours Truly, Angry Mob" and the edition offered at American Best Buy stores.
- CD BUN125CD
1. "Everything Is Average Nowadays"
2. "Out of My Depth"

== Charts ==
Chart (2007)	Peak position
Czech Republic Airplay (ČNS IFPI)	32
Dutch Top 40	91
Eurochart Hot 100 Singles	56
German Singles Chart	99
UK Singles Chart	19
