= Ruby (Kaiser Chiefs song) =

2007 single by Kaiser Chiefs

Single by Kaiser Chiefs

from the album Yours Truly, Angry Mob
- B-side: "Admire You"; "From the Neck Down"
- Released: 29 January 2007
- Recorded: Late 2006
- Studio: Hook End (Oxfordshire, England)
- Genre: Power pop
- Length: 3:23
- Label: B-Unique; Polydor
- Songwriters: Ricky Wilson; Andrew White; Simon Rix; Nick Baines; Nick Hodgson
- Producer: Stephen Street

Kaiser Chiefs singles chronology
"You Can Have It All" (2005)	"Ruby" (2007)	"Everything Is Average Nowadays" (2007)

Music video
- "Ruby" on YouTube

"Ruby" is a song by English indie rock band Kaiser Chiefs. It was released in the United States on 29 January 2007 and the United Kingdom on 5 February as the lead single from their second studio album, Yours Truly, Angry Mob (2007). It became the band's first British number-one single on 25 February 2007 and ended 2007 as the year's 10th-biggest-selling single in the UK, with total sales of 313,765. As of July 2026, it has sold over 1,800,000 copies in the UK as stated by the British Phonographic Industry (BPI). In the US, it charted at number seven the Billboard Triple A chart, becoming the band's highest-charting hit in the US. "Ruby" was voted number 13 on the Triple J Hottest 100 of 2007, Australia's largest annual music poll.

A video single of the song was released in the US at Best Buy stores on 13 March 2007, two weeks before the album was released there, and featured a live version of "Everything Is Average Nowadays" and the B-side "Admire You" (released on the UK 7-inch version).

== Content ==
Speaking about the song lead singer Ricky Wilson said that Ruby "is super cool, totally unapproachable" and that "there was a girl like that at school". Guitarist Andrew White said, "[I]t's not really about anyone" and "if you know someone called Ruby, it's about them". In a 2022 TikTok video, former drummer and the song's backing vocalist and co-writer Nick Hodgson revealed that the song was about his family pet, a black Labrador named Ruby.

== Music video ==
The promo for "Ruby" was directed by Swedish production company Stylewar, who also produced the 2005 video for "I Predict a Riot" and later the video for its follow-up "Everything Is Average Nowadays", and features the band performing in a desert landscape whilst a CGI metropolis-like miniature city builds around them. The video was scheduled to be shown on Channel 4 at 11:35 p.m. on 15 January 2007 but was pulled from the schedules for unknown reasons. The video finally premiered on the official Kaiser Chiefs website four days later.

== Track listings ==
- UK 7-inch ruby-red vinyl single

A. "Ruby"
B. "Admire You"

- UK and Irish CD single; digital download
1. "Ruby" – 3:24
2. "From the Neck Down" – 2:29
- Best Buy video single
1. "Everything Is Average Nowadays" (live)
2. "Admire You"
3. "Ruby" (video)
- European CD single
1. "Ruby"
2. "From the Neck Down"
3. "Admire You"
4. "Ruby" (video)

== Charts ==
=== Weekly charts ===
Chart (2007)	Peak position
Australian Digital Tracks (ARIA)	35
Austria (Ö3 Austria Top 40)	14
Belgium (Ultratop 50 Flanders)	5
Belgium (Ultratop 50 Wallonia)	28
Canada Hot 100 (Billboard)	79
Canada Rock (Billboard)	26
CIS Airplay (TopHit)	124
Czech Republic Airplay (ČNS IFPI)	1
Europe (Eurochart Hot 100)	1
Germany (GfK)	11
Hungary (Editors' Choice Top 40)	31
Ireland (IRMA)	5
Netherlands (Dutch Top 40)	7
Netherlands (Single Top 100)	7
New Zealand (Recorded Music NZ)	29
Norway (VG-lista)	16
Russia Airplay (TopHit)	178
Scottish Singles Sales (Official Charts)	1
Slovakia Airplay (ČNS IFPI)	15
Switzerland (Schweizer Hitparade)	13
Turkey (Billboard Türkiye)	18
UK Singles (Official Charts)	1
Ukraine Airplay (TopHit)	120
US Adult Alternative Airplay (Billboard)	7
US Alternative Airplay (Billboard)	14

=== Year-end charts ===
Chart (2007)	Position
Austria (Ö3 Austria Top 40)	45
Belgium (Ultratop 50 Flanders)	10
Europe (Eurochart Hot 100)	25
Germany (Media Control GfK)	46
Netherlands (Dutch Top 40)	26
Netherlands (Single Top 100)	51
Switzerland (Schweizer Hitparade)	28
UK Singles (OCC)	10

Chart (2008)	Position
UK Singles (OCC)	189

== Certifications ==
Region	Certification	Certified units/sales
Belgium (BRMA)	Gold	25,000^{*}
Brazil (Pro-Música Brasil)	Gold	30,000^{‡}
Denmark (IFPI Danmark)	Gold	7,500^{^}
New Zealand (RMNZ)	Platinum	30,000^{‡}
Spain (Promusicae)	Gold	30,000^{‡}
United Kingdom (BPI)	3× Platinum	1,800,000^{‡}
^{*} Sales figures based on certification alone.^{^} Shipments figures based on certification alone.^{‡} Sales+streaming figures based on certification alone.

== Release history ==
Region	Date	Format(s)	Label(s)	Ref.
United States	29 January 2007	Modern rock radio	Universal Motown	
United Kingdom	5 February 2007	Digital download	B-Unique; Polydor	
United Kingdom	19 February 2007	7-inch vinyl; CD	B-Unique; Polydor	
United States	22 May 2007	Contemporary hit radio	Universal Motown	

== Notable cover versions ==
As part of the BBC Electric Proms the song was performed by the Ukulele Orchestra of Great Britain. On 19 January 2011, Italian band Elio e le Storie Tese played a cover version of the song at the nationwide TV-show Parla con Me, with lyrics changed into a satiric reference to the Rubygate sex scandal, which then Italian Prime Minister Silvio Berlusconi had just been involved with.
