= Parachute (Kaiser Chiefs song) =

Single by Kaiser Chiefs

from the album Stay Together
- Released: 14 June 2016
- Recorded: 2016
- Genre: Electropop, dance-pop
- Length: 3:53
- Label: Caroline International, Universal Music
- Songwriters: Nick Baines, Simon Rix, Andrew White, Ricky Wilson

Kaiser Chiefs singles chronology
"Falling Awake" (2015)	"Parachute" (2016)	"Hole In My Soul" (2016)

"Parachute" is a song by English band Kaiser Chiefs. It is the lead single from their sixth studio album, Stay Together. It was accompanied by a music video directed by Ed Sayers (depicting frontman Ricky Wilson diving into a public pool in various costumes while trying to impress his bandmates), who would also direct the video for its follow-up "Hole In My Soul".

== Weekly charts ==
Chart (2018)	Peak position
Scotland Singles (Official Charts)	100
Switzerland Airplay (Schweizer Hitparade)	90
UK Singles Downloads (Official Charts)	86
