= Stay Together (album) =

Studio album by Kaiser Chiefs
- Released: 7 October 2016
- Recorded: 2015–2016
- Genre: Pop rock
- Length: 51:41
- Label: Fiction
- Producers: Kaiser Chiefs, Brian Higgins

Kaiser Chiefs chronology
Education, Education, Education & War (2014)	Stay Together (2016)	Duck (2019)

Singles from Stay Together
- 1. "Parachute" Released: 14 June 2016; 2. "Hole in My Soul" Released: 18 August 2016; 3. "We Stay Together" Released: 21 December 2016

Stay Together is the sixth studio album by Kaiser Chiefs, released on 7 October 2016. The album's name is a reference to the opening track "We Stay Together". The first single from the album, "Parachute", was released on 14 June 2016. The second single, "Hole In My Soul" was released 18 August 2016 and the third and final single, "We Stay Together" was released on 9 December 2016. The album marked a notable shift in the band's sound, incorporating more electronic and synth-pop elements.

== Recording and style ==
The album features a dance-oriented sound and includes songs that explore a range of topics, including monogamy ("We Stay Together") and sex ("Good Clean Fun"). In contrast to the album's predecessor, Education, Education, Education and War, which was more focused on politics and the perils of war, the Kaiser Chiefs made Stay Together with a focus on love and relationships. Wilson elaborated further on the stark contrast between the last album and Stay Together: "The thing about writing a protest album is it's straightforward. Only an idiot would disagree with you. You're just saying war is bad. But when you start talking about relationships like on this record it's harder because there’s a lot more blurred lines. There's no right or wrong”.

A sold out UK arena tour followed with critics describing the tour as “WILD, energetic and memorable”.

== Promotion ==
On 13 June 2016, Kaiser Chiefs released a song titled "Parachute" onto their YouTube account, and later a music video. Two months later, on 18 August 2016, the band released the second single, "Hole in My Soul".

On 9 December, "We Stay Together" was released.

Numerous TV performances and appearances followed including; Sunday Brunch, BBC Breakfast and Mrs Brown's Boys.

== Singles ==
Professional ratings
Aggregate scores
Source	Rating
Metacritic	59/100
Review scores
Source	Rating
AllMusic	3.5/5 stars
The Daily Telegraph	3/5 stars
The Guardian	3/5 stars

On 14 June 2016, Kaiser Chiefs released the lead single, "Parachute", with a music video following on 20 June.

On 18 August 2016, the band released the second single, "Hole in My Soul".

== Commercial performance ==
The album peaked at 4 on the UK Albums Chart and produced two top 40 airplay hits in "Hole In My Soul" and "Parachute".

== Track listing ==
No.	Title	Writer(s)	Length
1.	"We Stay Together"	Richard Wilson; Simon Rix; Nicholas Baines; Vijay Mistry; Andrew White; Brian Higgins; Miranda Cooper; Georgia Morgan; Sarah Thompson; Toby Scott; Luke Fitton	4:32
2.	"Hole in My Soul"	Wilson; Rix; Baines; Mistry; White; Alexander Burnett; Higgins; Matthew Gray; Scott; Fitton	4:28
3.	"Parachute"	Wilson; Rix; Baines; Mistry; White; Higgins; Gray; Scott; Owen Parker; Daniel Shah	3:52
4.	"Good Clean Fun"	Wilson; Rix; Baines; Mistry; White; Higgins; Cooper; Scott	5:08
5.	"Why Do You Do It to Me?"	Wilson; Rix; Baines; Mistry; White; James Newman; Higgins; Nicholas Coler; Scott	4:26
6.	"Indoor Firework"	Wilson; Rix; Baines; Mistry; White; Higgins; Scott	3:57
7.	"Press Rewind"	Wilson; Rix; Baines; Mistry; White; Higgins; Cooper; Uzoechi Emenike	5:01
8.	"Happen in a Heartbeat"	Wilson; Rix; Baines; Mistry; White; Andrew Robinson; Higgins; Cooper; Scott	3:20
9.	"High Society"	Wilson; Rix; Baines; Mistry; White; Higgins; Cooper; Coler; Timothy Larcombe	3:47
10.	"Sunday Morning"	Wilson; Rix; Baines; Mistry; White; Higgins; Scott; Wayne Hector; Larcombe	4:30
11.	"Still Waiting" (ends at 4:44, hidden track "Lazor Jam" starts at 5:40)	Wilson; Rix; Baines; Mistry; White; Higgins; Scott; Fitton	8:41

== Personnel ==
Kaiser Chiefs

- Ricky Wilson – lead vocals, percussion
- Andrew "Whitey" White – guitar, backing vocals
- Simon Rix – bass guitar, backing vocals
- Nick "Peanut" Baines – keyboards
- Vijay Mistry – drums, percussion

== Charts ==
Chart (2016)	Peak position
Belgian Albums (Ultratop Flanders)	89
Belgian Albums (Ultratop Wallonia)	105
Scottish Albums (Official Charts)	4
Swiss Albums (Schweizer Hitparade)	88
UK Albums (Official Charts)	4
