= Kaiser Chiefs' Easy Eighth Album =

Studio album by Kaiser Chiefs
- Released: 1 March 2024
- Genre: Pop-funk
- Length: 29:51
- Label: V2
- Producer: Amir Amor

Kaiser Chiefs chronology
Duck (2019)	Kaiser Chiefs' Easy Eighth Album (2024)	Employment 20 (China Anniversary Edition) (2025)

Singles from Kaiser Chiefs' Easy Eighth Album
- 1. "How 2 Dance" Released: 4 November 2022; 2. "Jealousy" Released: 11 April 2023; 3. "Feeling Alright" Released: 25 October 2023; 4. "Burning in Flames" Released: 19 January 2024; 5. "Beautiful Girl" Released: 14 February 2024

Kaiser Chiefs' Easy Eighth Album is the eighth studio album by English indie rock band Kaiser Chiefs, released on 1 March 2024. Produced by Amir Amor, it was preceded by the singles "How 2 Dance", "Jealousy", "Feeling Alright" (co-written with Nile Rodgers), "Burning in Flames" and "Beautiful Girl". It received positive reviews from critics and debuted in the top 10 of the UK Albums Chart.

== Background ==
Along with the release of the "Feeling Alright" single, frontman Ricky Wilson said:

On the first day with Nile Rodgers, he said 'what have you got?' We searched through some jams we had and this was a song that stood out to him. The band loved playing it round and round, and it must be fun to play but we never really knew where it would find a home. Nile turned out to be the best estate agent and found it a home almost immediately. He also brought in Amir, who turned out to be our housemate for the entire record. A good place to start!

== Critical reception ==
Professional ratings
Aggregate scores
Source	Rating
Metacritic	66/100
Review scores
Source	Rating
AllMusic	3.5/5 stars
The Arts Desk	2/5 stars
Clash	7/10
Mojo	3/5 stars
MusicOMH	2.5/5 stars

Kaiser Chiefs' Easy Eighth Album received a score of 65 out of 100 on review aggregator Metacritic based on six critics' reviews, indicating "generally favorable" reception. AllMusic's Neil Z. Yeung stated that the band "finally figure out how to balance the vibes of their anthemic, pub-friendly early-era fare with their pop-polished late-2010s material", writing that "every track is custom-designed to inspire a good time, whether that's the soundtrack to a bit of love (or lust) or a full-on dance party". Reviewing the album for Clash, Emma Harrison characterised it as "a funk-laden album which includes a smattering of tracks that are certain to become mainstays of the band's live sets in the coming years" as well as "an admirable attempt of fusing together eighties funk-pop sensibilities with the classic Kaiser Chiefs indie rock sound".

Mojo felt that "despite one-time Rudimental leader Amir Amor's rather flat production and the dearth of all-out tub-thumpers beyond the wry 'The Lads', they've transformed themselves inti a differently beguiling proposition". MusicOMH's John Murphy described the tracks as "slinky pop-funk tunes" and "certainly a new sound that takes some getting used to" despite finding that "a fair amount" of it "sounds weirdly dated". Ellie Roberts of The Arts Desk found that while "there is an easy feeling to the album, [...] it leans dangerously close to blasé at times" and "they lack the energy needed to secure a place on the playlists of the future".

== Track listing ==
All tracks are written by Ricky Wilson, Andrew White, Simon Rix, Nick Baines, and Vijay Mistry, with others noted.

Kaiser Chiefs' Easy Eighth Album track listing
No.	Title	Writer(s)	Length
1.	"Feeling Alright"	Nile Rodgers	3:37
2.	"Beautiful Girl"	Iain Archer	2:32
3.	"How 2 Dance"	Karen Harding; Robert Harvey; Alex Smith; Amir Amor	2:43
4.	"The Job Centre Shuffle" (featuring Hak Baker)	Amor; Hak Baker	3:00
5.	"Burning in Flames"	Amor; Leroy Clampitt	3:08
6.	"Reasons to Stay Alive"	Amor	3:04
7.	"Sentimental Love Songs"	Amor	2:44
8.	"Jealousy"	Henry Tucker; Amor; Lewis Thompson; RISC	2:09
9.	"Noel Groove"	Amor; Ben Allen	3:02
10.	"The Lads"	Amor; Fryars	3:52
Total length:			29:51

== Charts ==
Chart performance for Kaiser Chiefs' Easy Eighth Album
Chart (2024)	Peak position
Scottish Albums (OCC)	6
UK Albums (OCC)	6
UK Independent Albums (OCC)	2
