= Modern Way =

2005 single by Kaiser Chiefs

Single by Kaiser Chiefs

from the album Employment
- B-side: "People Need Light"; "Moon"; "It Ain't Easy" (demo); "Run Again"
- Released: 7 November 2005
- Genre: Alternative rock
- Length: 4:03 (album version); 3:31 (radio edit)
- Label: B-Unique
- Songwriters: Ricky Wilson; Andrew White; Simon Rix; Nick Baines; Nick Hodgson
- Producer: Stephen Street

Kaiser Chiefs singles chronology
"I Predict a Riot" / "Sink that Ship" (2005)	"Modern Way" (2005)	"You Can Have It All" (2005)

"Modern Way" is the fourth and final single released from English indie rock band Kaiser Chiefs' 2005 debut album, Employment, on 7 November 2005. It entered the UK Singles Chart at No. 11 and became a minor hit in Ireland and the Netherlands.

== Music video ==
The song's music video marked the directorial debut of the band's lead singer, Ricky Wilson and was co-directed by prolific video director Scott Lyon. It tells of the success of William Green, a contact juggler who has a unique skill for balancing tennis balls on his face, and the impact that he has made on the public. The band appears throughout as extras, donning glasses and facial hair. During Green's climatic performance, they appear as themselves.

== Reception ==
AllMusic called the song "moody-yet-stylish". NME called it "sublime" comparing it to Blur's "Popscene", and PlayLouder.com similarly compared it to Modern Life Is Rubbish. Pitchfork's Joe Tangari reviewed the album and called "Modern Way" "the only song on the LP that is truly dynamic" praising the "fluid verses" and build up to the "towering chorus". He does concede that the song makes him imagine the band during recording asking for "More Cowbell".

== Track listings ==
UK CD1

1. "Modern Way" – 3:31
2. "People Need Light" – 3:06

UK CD2

1. "Modern Way" – 3:31
2. "Moon" – 2:51
3. "It Ain't Easy" (demo) – 2:25
4. "Modern Way" (video)

UK 7-inch single

A. "Modern Way" – 3:31
B. "Run Again" – 2:40

== Charts ==
Chart (2005–2006)	Peak position
Ireland (IRMA)	47
Netherlands (Single Top 100)	89
Scottish Singles Sales (Official Charts)	12
UK Singles (Official Charts)	11

== Other versions ==
One of Kaiser Chiefs' contemporary bands from Yorkshire, the Cribs, covered "Modern Way" in 2005, as a B-side to their single "Mirror Kissers". In 2006, the song was reworked for the Buena Vista Social Club album Rhythms del Mundo.
