= Oh Honey (disambiguation) =

Oh Honey is a 2011 episode of How I Met Your Mother, it may also refer to:

- Oh Honey (band), an American band
- "Oh Honey", a 1978 single by Delegation
- "Oh Honey", a 2005 single by Alterkicks
- "Oh Honey", a 2006 single by The Audreys
