= Yours Truly, Angry Mob =

Studio album by Kaiser Chiefs
- Released: 21 February 2007
- Recorded: September–October 2006
- Studios: Hook End Studio, Oxfordshire
- Genres: Indie rock, power pop, post-punk revival
- Length: 44:37
- Labels: B-Unique (UK); Universal Motown (US)
- Producer: Stephen Street

Kaiser Chiefs chronology
Enjoyment (2005)	Yours Truly, Angry Mob (2007)	Off with Their Heads (2008)

Singles from Yours Truly, Angry Mob
- 1. "Ruby" Released: 29 January 2007; 2. "Everything Is Average Nowadays" Released: 21 May 2007; 3. "The Angry Mob" Released: 20 August 2007; 4. "Love's Not a Competition (But I'm Winning)" Released: 12 November 2007

Professional ratings
Aggregate scores
Source	Rating
Metacritic	61/100
Review scores
Source	Rating
AllMusic	4/5 stars
BBC	Positive
Drowned in Sound	3/10 stars
The Guardian	4/5 stars
NME	7/10 stars
OMM	4/5 stars
Pitchfork	5.0/10
Rolling Stone	3/5 stars

Yours Truly, Angry Mob is the second studio album by English rock band Kaiser Chiefs. It was released on 21 February 2007 in Japan, 23 February 2007 in Belgium and the Netherlands, 26 February 2007 in the rest of the world by B-Unique Records and in March in North America by Universal Motown. Produced by Stephen Street, who produced the band's debut album Employment, Yours Truly, Angry Mob is lyrically darker and more socially aware than its predecessor, with tracks dealing with street crime, violence, fame, and the inaccuracy of tabloid articles. The song "Boxing Champ" features drummer Nick Hodgson on lead vocals.

== Album information ==
The band revealed to NME in October 2006 that they had recorded 22 songs and hoped to whittle that number down to 13 or 14 for the final album. Additionally, in July 2006 the band revealed to Gigwise that they hoped to have the album released by Valentine's Day 2007. The album was preceded by the release of lead single "Ruby" on 29 January. It became the band's first, and to date, only, number one single on the UK Singles Chart. The album topped the UK Albums Chart and the band released the singles "Everything Is Average Nowadays" on 21 May 2007 and "The Angry Mob" on 20 August 2007. The final single "Love's Not a Competition (But I'm Winning)" was released as a collector's edition 7" single on 12 November 2007, with The Little Ones' cover of "Everything Is Average Nowadays" as a B-side.

The third track on the album, "Heat Dies Down" was never released as an actual single, but music channels started airing a music video, compiled from of on-tour footage and studio recording, in January 2008. Radio stations such as XFM, also started playing the song and it reached Number 9 on the Apple iTunes Driving Songs Chart on 9 June 2008.

== Track listing ==
All tracks are written by Ricky Wilson, Andrew White, Simon Rix, Nick Baines, and Nick Hodgson.

No.	Title	Length
1.	"Ruby"	3:25
2.	"The Angry Mob"	4:48
3.	"Heat Dies Down"	3:57
4.	"Highroyds"	3:19
5.	"Love's Not a Competition (But I'm Winning)"	3:17
6.	"Thank You Very Much"	2:37
7.	"I Can Do It Without You"	3:24
8.	"My Kind of Guy"	4:06
9.	"Everything Is Average Nowadays"	2:44
10.	"Boxing Champ"	1:31
11.	"Learnt My Lesson Well"	3:54
12.	"Try Your Best"	3:42
13.	"Retirement"	3:53

Japanese bonus tracks
No.	Title	Length
13.	"Admire You"	3:41
14.	"I Like to Fight"	4:06
15.	"The Angry Mob" (Live in Berlin)	5:05

Best Buy bonus tracks
No.	Title	Length
13.	"From the Neck Down"	2:29
14.	"I Like to Fight"	4:06
15.	"The Angry Mob" (Live in Berlin)	5:05

Digital deluxe edition bonus tracks
No.	Title	Length
14.	"The Angry Mob" (Live in Berlin)	5:05
15.	"Everything Is Average Nowadays" (Live in Berlin)	3:24
16.	"Ruby" (Live in Berlin)	3:57
17.	"Retirement" (Live in Berlin)	4:18
18.	"Heat Dies Down" (Live in Berlin)	4:47
19.	"Highroyds" (Live in Berlin)	4:37

Deluxe edition bonus DVD
No.	Title	Length
1.	"The Angry Mob" (Live in Berlin)	5:05
2.	"Everything Is Average Nowadays" (Live in Berlin)	3:24
3.	"Ruby" (Live in Berlin)	3:57
4.	"Retirement" (Live in Berlin)	4:18
5.	"Heat Dies Down" (Live in Berlin)	4:47
6.	"Highroyds" (Live in Berlin)	4:37
7.	"Tim Short Film"	12:30
8.	"Your Song" (Bonus Audio)	4:18

- In Europe, Asia and America, "Learnt My Lesson Well" and "Boxing Champ" were added together to make one track, at a running time of 5:25.
- In Japan, "Boxing Champ" and "Everything Is Average Nowadays" were added together to make one track, at a running time of 4:15.

== Personnel ==
Kaiser Chiefs

- Nick Baines – keyboards
- Nick Hodgson – drums, lead vocals on "Boxing Champ"
- Simon Rix – bass
- Andrew White – guitar
- Ricky Wilson – lead vocals (except "Boxing Champ")

Production

- Stephen Street – production, mixing
- Tom Stanley – engineering
- Cenzo Townsend – engineering, mixing
- Alex Mackenzie – assistant engineer
- John Davis – mastering

== Critical reception ==
Critical response to Yours Truly, Angry Mob was generally positive. At Metacritic, which assigns a normalized rating out of 100 to reviews from mainstream critics, the album has received an average score of 61, based on 29 reviews.

- Spin (p. 92) - 3.5 stars out of 5 -- "[The album] marches through its baker's dozen of punk-tinged pop songs with a prickly sense of purpose."
- Q magazine (p. 106) - 4 stars out of 5 -- "[T]he eccentric twists bolster Yours Truly's main thrust....The chorus among choruses belongs to the decidedly unaverage 'Everything Is Average Nowadays'..."
- Uncut (p. 80) - 4 stars out of 5 -- "[T]heir second album manages to be full of surprises, while never straying too far from what you'd expect."
- CMJ (p. 39) - "The band, in love as ever with the Britpop tradition that spawned them, offers another collection of swaggering uptempo guitar tracks that are full of big, singalong choruses..."
- Q magazine (p. 84) - Ranked #13 in Q's "The 50 Best Albums of 2007" -- "'The Angry Mob' was the definitive illustration of their maturing lyrical wit and musical brawn."
- Mojo (p. 98) - 4 stars out of 5 -- "Opener 'Ruby' is a foot-to-the-floor, festival monster-in-waiting, while 'Highroyds' recalls Blur's effervescent, buzzsaw pop."

== Charts and certifications ==
=== Weekly charts ===
Chart (2007)	Peak position
Australian Albums (ARIA)	9
Austrian Albums (Ö3 Austria)	5
Belgian Albums (Ultratop Flanders)	2
Belgian Albums (Ultratop Wallonia)	30
Canadian Albums (Billboard)	26
Danish Albums (Hitlisten)	29
Dutch Albums (Album Top 100)	1
French Albums (SNEP)	45
German Albums (Offizielle Top 100)	6
Greek Albums (IFPI)	1
Irish Albums (IRMA)	2
New Zealand Albums (RMNZ)	11
Norwegian Albums (VG-lista)	13
Portuguese Albums (AFP)	29
Scottish Albums (Official Charts)	1
Spanish Albums (Promusicae)	37
Swedish Albums (Sverigetopplistan)	31
Swiss Albums (Schweizer Hitparade)	11
UK Albums (Official Charts)	1
US Billboard 200	45
US Top Rock Albums (Billboard)	12

=== Year-end charts ===
Chart (2007)	Position
Belgian Albums (Ultratop Flanders)	30
Dutch Albums (Album Top 100)	40
German Albums (Offizielle Top 100)	90
Swiss Albums (Schweizer Hitparade)	90
UK Albums (OCC)	7

Chart (2008)	Position
UK Albums (OCC)	96

=== Certifications ===
Region	Certification	Certified units/sales
Austria (IFPI Austria)	Gold	10,000^{*}
Belgium (BRMA)	Gold	25,000^{*}
Greece (IFPI Greece)	Gold	7,500^{^}
Ireland (IRMA)	Platinum	15,000^{^}
United Kingdom (BPI)	2× Platinum	600,000^{*}
Summaries
Europe (IFPI)	Platinum	1,000,000^{*}
^{*} Sales figures based on certification alone.^{^} Shipments figures based on certification alone.

== Release details ==
Country	Date	Label	Format	Catalogue
Japan	21 February 2007	Universal International	CD, digital download	UICU-1131 / 4988005458735
Europe	23 February 2007	Universal International	CD, digital download	4988005458727
United Kingdom and Ireland	26 February 2007	B-Unique	CD, digital download, vinyl LP	BUN122LP / 6 02517 24291 3
United Kingdom and Ireland	26 February 2007	B-Unique	CD, digital download, vinyl LP	BUN122CD / 6 02517 23425 3
United Kingdom and Ireland	26 February 2007	B-Unique	CD, digital download, vinyl LP	BUN122CDS / 6 02517 23431 4
United States and Canada	27 March 2007	B-Unique, Universal Motown	CD, digital download, CD+DVD	B0008588-02 / 6 02517 24960 8
United States and Canada	27 March 2007	B-Unique, Universal Motown	CD, digital download, CD+DVD	B0008673-02 / 6 02517 26368 0
United States and Canada	27 March 2007	B-Unique, Universal Motown	CD, digital download, CD+DVD	B0008543-00 / 6 02517 23431 4
