= Record Collection =

Record Collection may refer to:

- Record Collection (record label), a Los Angeles–based music studio
- Record Collection (album), a 2010 album by Mark Ronson & The Business Intl.
- "Record Collection", a song by Kaiser Chiefs on the 2019 album, Duck

See also

- Record collecting
- Record Collector, a British monthly music magazine
