= Lap of Honour =

EP by Kaiser Chiefs
- Released: 18 January 2005
- Recorded: 2005
- Genre: Indie rock
- Length: 26:21
- Label: B-Unique / Universal
- Producer: Stephen Street

Kaiser Chiefs chronology
22 (2003)	Lap of Honour (2005)	Employment (2005)

Lap of Honour is an EP released on 18 January 2005 as a Japan-only release by British rock band Kaiser Chiefs, though it is available for import. The EP mostly consists of B-sides featured on the single releases from their debut album Employment, plus live sessions and an exclusive remix of "Na Na Na Na Naa". The album cover depicts the Royal coat of arms of the United Kingdom.

== Track listing ==
- CD UICU-1102
1. "Sink That Ship" (appears on the "I Predict a Riot"/"Sink that Ship" single) – 2:37
2. "Hard Times Send Me"(appears on the "Oh My God" maxi-CD single) – 2:42
3. "Think About You (and I Like It)" (appears on the "Oh My God" CD single) – 4:50
4. "Not Surprised" (appears on the "Everyday I Love You Less and Less" maxi-CD single) – 3:25
5. "Na Na Na Na Naa" (Polysics Remix) (exclusive to EP) – 4:34
6. "Seventeen Cups" (appears on the "Everyday I Love You Less and Less" maxi-CD single) – 3:36
7. "Take My Temperature" (Live) (the original version appears on the "I Predict a Riot" single) – 4:47
