= I Predict a Riot =

2004 single by Kaiser Chiefs

Single by Kaiser Chiefs

from the album Employment
- B-side: 2004: "Take My Temperature", "Wrecking Ball"; 2005: "Less Is More", "Everyday I Love You Less and Less" (remix)
- Released: 1 November 2004
- Recorded: August 2004
- Studio: Chapel (Lincoln, England)
- Genre: Power pop; indie rock
- Length: 3:52
- Label: B-Unique
- Songwriters: Ricky Wilson; Andrew White; Simon Rix; Nick Baines; Nick Hodgson
- Producer: Stephen Street

Kaiser Chiefs singles chronology
"Oh My God" (2004)	"I Predict a Riot" (2004)	"Oh My God" (2005)
"Everyday I Love You Less and Less" (2005)	"I Predict a Riot" / "Sink That Ship" (2005)	"Modern Way" (2005)

Music videos
- "I Predict a Riot" on YouTube; "I Predict a Riot" (New Lighter version) on YouTube

"I Predict a Riot" is a song by English indie rock band Kaiser Chiefs, appearing on their debut album, Employment (2005). It was originally released as their second single on 1 November 2004 and was the band's first release on the B-Unique label. It entered at number 22 on the UK Singles Chart. When re-released in 2005 as a double A-side with "Sink That Ship", it peaked at number 9 on the UK chart.

== Background ==
Drummer Nick Hodgson used to DJ at a club in Leeds called the Cockpit. He would often drive home past another nightclub called Majestyk's which often had people and police fighting each other, and sometimes drunk clubgoers would even bang on the windows of his car at 3 am. He took inspiration from this one night and wrote a riff on the piano when he got home. The "friend of a friend who got beaten" was a friend of a fellow DJ at the Cockpit. The title came from an event Hodgson DJed at a different club called Pigs, where a band called Black Wire was playing. The crowd was so chaotic that he said to the club's boss, "I predict a riot".

The song makes a reference to John Smeaton ("an old Leodensian"), a civil engineer born in 1724 and a former pupil of Leeds Grammar School, the same school attended by the band’s singer, Ricky Wilson.

The song's lyrics were criticised by Owen Jones for expressing "pure class bile" and reproducing "the caricature of the undignified, 'slapper' chav girl".

== Music videos ==
Two music videos were released for "I Predict a Riot", one for the original 2004 release and one for the 2005 reissue with "Sink That Ship" as a double A-side. The first video was directed by Charlie Paul, who in between had also worked with the Kaiser Chiefs on both music videos for "Oh My God", and filmed on 3 September 2004, depicting the band performing the song intercut with footage of fans having a pillow fight. The second video, the "New Lighter version", was directed by Swedish production company Stylewar (who would later work with the band again in 2007 for the "Ruby" and "Everything Is Average Nowadays" videos), and shot in black and white, which depicts the band in Victorian England.

== Live performances ==
"I Predict a Riot" was one of the three tracks the band played when they opened Live 8 in Philadelphia, alongside "Everyday I Love You Less and Less" and "Oh My God".

== Usage ==
"I Predict a Riot" has been used by Australian Adelaide United FC in the A-League Men immediately following home wins, starting with the 2025-26 season. Leeds United fans often sing along to the song during matches held at Elland Road. English professional darts player Luke Humphries uses the song as his walk-on music due to his support for Leeds United.

== Track listings ==
- UK 7-inch single (2004)

A. "I Predict a Riot"
B. "Take My Temperature"

- UK CD single (2004)
1. "I Predict a Riot"
2. "Wrecking Ball"
- Australian CD single (2005)
1. "I Predict a Riot" – 3:54
2. "Wrecking Ball" – 3:50
3. "Take My Temperature" – 2:35
4. "I Predict a Riot" (video)
- UK CD1 and 7-inch single (2005)
1. "I Predict a Riot" – 3:54
2. "Sink That Ship" – 2:38
- UK CD2 (2005)
1. "I Predict a Riot" – 3:54
2. "Less Is More" – 2:52
3. "Everyday I Love You Less and Less" (Boys Noize remix) – 5:26
4. "I Predict a Riot" (new version—video)

== Charts ==
=== Weekly charts ===
Chart (2004)	Peak position
Scottish Singles Sales (Official Charts)	35
UK Singles (Official Charts)	22
UK Independent (Official Charts)	2

Chart (2005)	Peak position
Australia Hitseekers (ARIA)	5
Belgium (Ultratip Bubbling Under Flanders)	17
Germany (GfK)	79
Ireland (IRMA) with "Sink That Ship"	25
Netherlands (Single Top 100)	74
Scottish Singles Sales (Official Charts) with "Sink That Ship"	8
UK Singles (Official Charts) with "Sink That Ship"	9
US Alternative Airplay (Billboard)	34

=== Year-end charts ===
Chart (2005)	Position
UK Singles (OCC)	68
Chart (2006)	Position
UK Singles (OCC)	121

== Certifications ==
Region	Certification	Certified units/sales
New Zealand (RMNZ)	Gold	15,000^{‡}
United Kingdom (BPI)	2× Platinum	1,200,000^{‡}
^{‡} Sales+streaming figures based on certification alone.

== Release history ==
Region	Version	Date	Format(s)	Label(s)	Ref.
United Kingdom	"I Predict a Riot"	1 November 2004	CD	B-Unique	
United States	"I Predict a Riot"	31 January 2005	Alternative radio	B-Unique	
United States	"I Predict a Riot"	23 May 2005	Contemporary hit; hot adult contemporary radio	B-Unique	
Australia	"I Predict a Riot"	23 May 2005	CD	B-Unique	
United Kingdom	"I Predict a Riot" / "Sink That Ship"	22 August 2005	CD	B-Unique; Polydor	

== In popular culture ==
When Liz Truss gave her farewell speech on 25 October 2022, the song was heard playing in the background. The incident was orchestrated by activist Steve Bray. It was also used in the opening episode of the first episode of the BBC school drama Waterloo Road and the Series 11 opener, in January 2023.
