= Duck (album) =

Studio album by Kaiser Chiefs
- Released: 26 July 2019
- Genre: Pop rock
- Length: 40:50
- Label: Polydor
- Producer: Kaiser Chiefs; Ben H. Allen; Andrew Wells

Kaiser Chiefs chronology
Stay Together (2016)	Duck (2019)	Kaiser Chiefs' Easy Eighth Album (2024)

Singles from Duck
- 1. "Record Collection" Released: 23 May 2019; 2. "People Know How to Love One Another" Released: 6 June 2019

Professional ratings
Aggregate scores
Source	Rating
Metacritic	61/100
Review scores
Source	Rating
Guardian	3/5 stars
NME	3/5 stars
Independent	3/5 stars
irishtimes.com	2/5 stars
Standard	3/5 stars
The Telegraph	4/5 stars
Theartsdesk.com	3/5 stars
Sputnikmusic	2.5/5 stars

Duck is the seventh studio album by English indie rock band Kaiser Chiefs, released on 26 July 2019. It is the follow-up to their 2016 album, Stay Together. It was preceded by the lead single "Record Collection". The album was promoted by a concert at Elland Road on 8 June 2019 to commemorate 100 years of Leeds United F.C.

== Background ==
Frontman Ricky Wilson said that the lead single "Record Collection" is "about the internet and frustration with the internet, about how it rules our lives but we don't really understand what it is and how we just click accept". The song is not to be confused with the title track of Record Collection by Mark Ronson, which was co-written by former Kaiser Chiefs member Nick Hodgson and subsequently covered by the band on triple j's Like a Version segment. The song entered iTunes Charts peaking at number 61 in Spain and 62 in Brazil.

== Track listing ==
No.	Title	Writer(s)	Length
1.	"People Know How to Love One Another"	Baines, Mistry, Rix, White, Wilson	3:36
2.	"Golden Oldies"	Baines, Mistry, Rix, White, Wilson, Ben H. Allen III	4:03
3.	"Wait"	Baines, Mistry, Rix, White, Wilson	3:50
4.	"Target Market"	Baines, Mistry, Rix, White, Wilson, Allen III	4:24
5.	"Don't Just Stand There, Do Something"	Baines, Mistry, Rix, White, Wilson, Iain Archer	2:52
6.	"Record Collection"	Baines, Mistry, Rix, White, Wilson, Emelie Eriksson, Marcus Holmberg, Allen III	4:17
7.	"The Only Ones"	Baines, Mistry, Rix, White, Wilson, Eriksson, Gregg Alexander	3:50
8.	"Lucky Shirt"	Baines, Mistry, Rix, White, Wilson, Archer	3:47
9.	"Electric Heart"	Baines, Mistry, Rix, White, Wilson, Dee Adam	3:09
10.	"Northern Holiday"	Baines, Mistry, Rix, White, Wilson	3:36
11.	"Kurt vs. Frasier (The Battle for Seattle)"	Baines, Mistry, Rix, White, Wilson	3:26
Total length:			40:50

== Charts ==
Chart performance for Duck
Chart (2019)	Peak position
Belgian Albums (Ultratop Flanders)	90
Belgian Albums (Ultratop Wallonia)	152
Scottish Albums (OCC)	3
Swiss Albums (Schweizer Hitparade)	40
UK Albums (OCC)	3
