= Alterkicks =

English rock band

- Origin: Liverpool
- Genres: Rock / Indie
- Years active: 2004–2007
- Label: B-Unique Records / Polydor
- Past members: Martin Stilwell; Gareth Padfield; Mike Oates; Mark Yari-Gerrard; Oliver Hughes
- Website: http://www.alterkicks.co.uk

Alterkicks were a Liverpool based five-piece band. They first came to attention when DJ Zane Lowe played their demo in November 2004.

They released their debut single, "Do Everything I Taught You" on Fierce Panda in 2005, and the limited release sold out. This led them to move to the bigger label Moshi Moshi for their second release "Oh Honey". Dermot O'Leary was impressed with their early singles and he invited the band to do a live set on his BBC Radio 2 show.

The band, who also had their own nightclub in Liverpool called "Little Big Man", were signed to B-Unique Records, and their single "On A Holiday" was released in November 2006. Their next single "Good Luck" was released in March 2007.

In August 2007, the band released their debut album, Do Everything I Taught You on B-Unique Records. The band split up on 30 October 2007. Band member Oli Hughes reportedly commented on the split in 2019, saying "I don't want to do down our punk-rock spirit, but basically, nobody bought our album and we couldn't be arsed after that."

== Discography ==
=== Singles ===
- "Do Everything I Taught You" (Fierce Panda, March 2005) - UK No. 71
- "Oh Honey" (Moshi Moshi, Summer 2005)
- "On a Holiday" (B-Unique Records, November 2006)
- "Good Luck"

=== Albums ===
- Do Everything I Taught You (B-Unique Records, August 2007)
