= Kaiser Chiefs =

English indie rock band

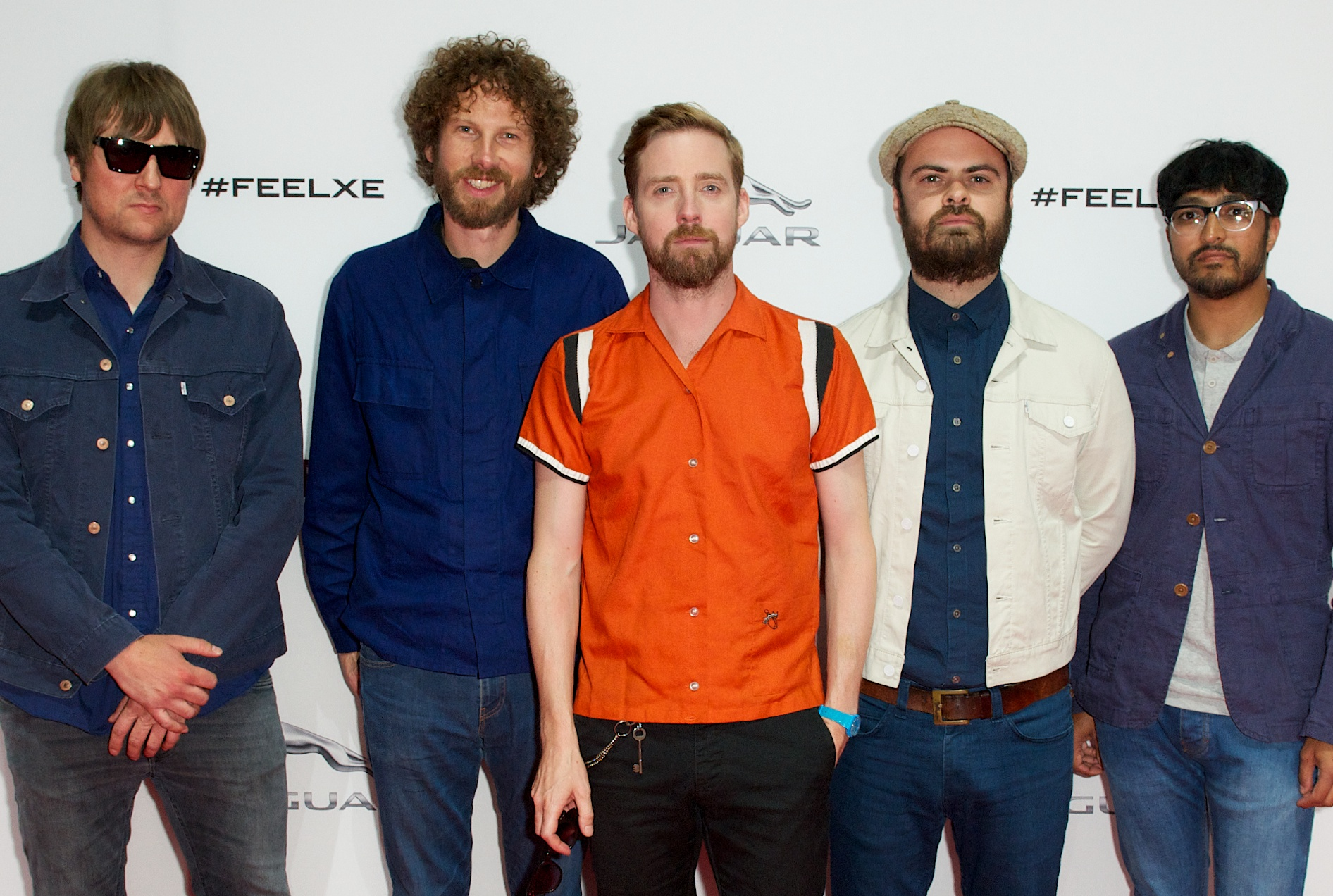
- the Kaiser Chiefs at the launch of the Jaguar XE in 2014; From left: Andrew White, Simon Rix, Ricky Wilson, Nick Baines, Vijay Mistry

Background information
- Also known as: Runston Parva (1996–2000); Parva (2000–2003)
- Origin: Leeds, England
- Genres: Indie rock
- Years active: 1996–present
- Labels: MCA Music, Inc.; B-Unique; Fiction; Polydor; Drowned in Sound; Mantra; Liberator; Caroline International; ATO; V2 Benelux
- Members: Ricky Wilson; Andrew White; Simon Rix; Nick Baines; Vijay Mistry
- Past members: Nick Hodgson
- Website: kaiserchiefs.com

The Kaiser Chiefs are an English indie rock band from Leeds who originally formed in 1996 as Runston Parva, before shortening their name to Parva in 2000, and releasing one studio album, 22, in 2003, before renaming and establishing themselves in their current name that same year. Since their formation, the band has consisted of lead vocalist Ricky Wilson, guitarist Andrew "Whitey" White, bassist Simon Rix, keyboardist Nick "Peanut" Baines and since 2013 drummer Vijay Mistry, who replaced founding drummer Nick Hodgson following his departure from the band in late 2012. (Note: One-off reunion as co-guitarist and backing vocalist: 2025)

Primarily inspired by new wave and punk rock music of the late 1970s and 1980s, the band has released eight original studio albums: Employment (2005), Yours Truly, Angry Mob (2007), Off with Their Heads (2008), The Future Is Medieval (2011), Education, Education, Education & War (2014), Stay Together (2016), Duck (2019), and Kaiser Chiefs' Easy Eighth Album (2024), one EP: the Japan-only Lap of Honour (2005), one compilation album: Souvenir: The Singles 2004–2012 (2012) and numerous singles, including the number one hit song "Ruby" (2007).

Their album Employment enjoyed critical and commercial success with over three million copies sold. It has won the band three Brit Awards, including the award for Best British Group, a NME award for Best Album, and was shortlisted for the Mercury Prize.

Their UK hit singles include 2004 and 2005 number 9 hit "I Predict a Riot", 2007 UK number 1 hit "Ruby", which has sold over 461,000 copies, from their platinum album Yours Truly, Angry Mob plus a further two Top 20 singles in 2007 with "The Angry Mob" and "Everything Is Average Nowadays". Their singles "Ruby" (2007), "I Predict a Riot" (2004), "Everyday I Love You Less and Less" (2005), "Never Miss a Beat" (2008) and "Oh My God" (2004) had sold a combined total of 1.1 million up to August 2012.

== History ==
Band logo

=== Runston Parva (1996–2000) ===
When they were around eleven years old, Nick Hodgson, Nick Baines and Simon Rix met in the same class at St. Mary's Catholic High School, Menston, West Yorkshire. After leaving school, Rix and Baines left for university in 1996 whereas Hodgson remained in the Leeds area, meeting both Andrew White and Ricky Wilson. Hodgson, White and Wilson formed the band Runston Parva, a deliberate misspelling of a small East Riding of Yorkshire hamlet called Ruston Parva. After Runston Parva failed to secure a record deal, the group re-formed as Parva upon the return of Rix and Baines from university.

=== Parva and 22 (2000–2003) ===
Parva's career went beyond the boundaries of Leeds, and the band was able to obtain both a record and publishing deal. However, after Beggars Banquet closed the Mantra label, Parva were dropped and without any direction after the release of an album (22) and three singles ("Heavy", "Good Bad Right Wrong" and "Hessles").

According to manager James Sandom in an interview with HitQuarters, as a dropped band they had become damaged goods, "No one would touch them because they had a history. A lot of people used their history against them." The band decided that they would aim for a longer-term record deal and started afresh with new songs and a new name: Kaiser Chiefs. The new name was taken from South African football club Kaizer Chiefs, the first club of ex-Leeds United captain Lucas Radebe.

Manager James Sandom was tipped off about the band by Drowned in Sound founder Sean Adams, who persuaded him to go and see them live. Sandom said: "I went to see a couple of shows and you were just bombarded by a series of potential hit singles." Soon after Sandom became their manager, Kaiser Chiefs signed to B-Unique Records. Atlantic Records had also made an offer for the band.

=== Employment (2004–2005) ===
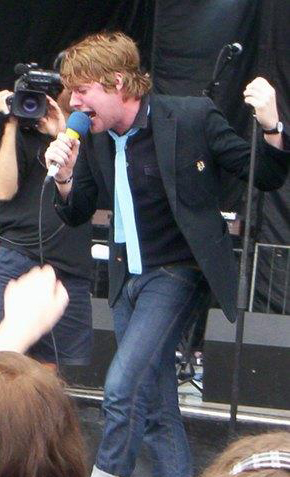
Ricky Wilson performing at Lollapalooza in 2005

In July 2004, while still relatively unknown inside the UK, Kaiser Chiefs performed their first festival outside the UK at a festival in Moscow. headlined by UK band Goldblade. One of the major factors in the band's breakthrough in 2005 was their involvement in the NME Awards Tour at the beginning of the year. Like Coldplay and Franz Ferdinand before them, their position as opening act proved an influential one, attracting a lot of positive media attention.

The group's debut album Employment was released in March 2005, being primarily inspired by new wave and punk rock music of the late 1970s and 1980s. The album was well received by music critics, described as "thrilling from beginning to end" and "quintessentially British, without pretension and most importantly, a whole lot of fun". It reached number two on the UK albums chart, and was certified five times platinum. In 2005, Employment was shortlisted for the Mercury Prize, an annual music prize awarded for the best British or Irish album from the previous year. Bookmakers made it favourite to win the award, but they eventually lost out to Antony and the Johnsons. In 2006, Employment won the Ivor Novello award for 'Best Album'

The first single released from the album was "Oh My God" in 2004, which reached number six on the UK singles chart when it was reissued in February 2005. In 2007, the song was covered by Mark Ronson and Lily Allen for Ronson's album Version; the band had a cameo appearance in that version's music video. "I Predict a Riot" soon followed as the album's second release. In 2007, the song was ranked number thirty-six on the NME "Greatest Indie Anthems Ever" countdown. The top twenty singles "Everyday I Love You Less and Less" and "Modern Way" followed in late 2005. The band opened and performed several of their singles at the Philadelphia Live Eight concert in 2005.

In 2006, the band received NME awards for 'Best Album' for Employment and 'Best Dressed' for Ricky Wilson.

=== Yours Truly, Angry Mob (2006–2007) ===
Kaiser Chiefs' second album Yours Truly, Angry Mob was released in February 2007. The group recorded the album throughout the September and October 2006 at Hookend Recording Studios in Oxfordshire, England. The group took inspiration from Led Zeppelin and American rock music, and recorded over twenty-two songs.

Yours Truly, Angry Mob reached number one on the UK albums chart and number forty-five on the Billboard 200 albums chart. The album went on to be the band's second Million Seller including the UK and European #1 Airplay Hit of 2007 "Ruby".

"Ruby", the album's lead single, became Kaiser Chiefs' first UK number one single and received the 2007 'Q Award' for 'Best Video'. "Everything Is Average Nowadays" was released as the album's second single, and reached No. 19 in the UK. The album's third single "The Angry Mob" peaked at number twenty-two in the UK. The fourth single, "Love's Not a Competition (But I'm Winning)", was released on 12 November as a collector's edition 7" only single via their website. In October 2007, the band contributed a cover of the Move's "Flowers in the Rain" as the opening track for the covers compilation album Radio 1: Established 1967, in celebration of the fortieth anniversary of the launch of BBC Radio 1, the Move's original famously the first song to air on the station upon its launch.

In December 2007, Kaiser Chiefs played two sold-out shows at Earl's Court in London to a capacity crowd of 30,000.

=== Off with Their Heads (2008–2009) ===
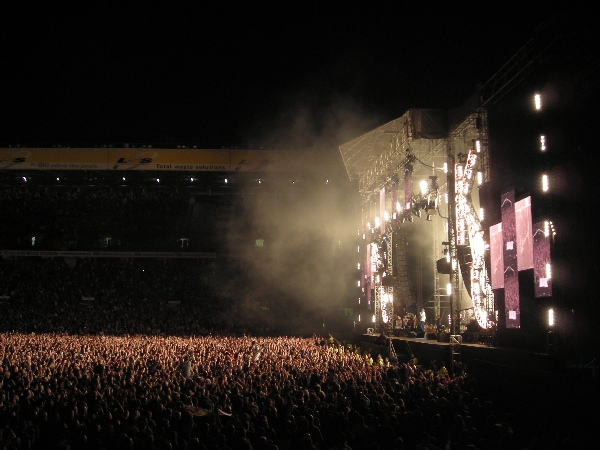
The stage at Elland Road stadium on 24 May 2008

On 4 August 2008, the band confirmed the name of their third album as Off with Their Heads. It was released on 20 October 2008. The first single "Never Miss a Beat" was released on 27 August 2008.

The band also released a DVD of their live performance at Elland Road from 24 May where they played to a sold out capacity crowd of 40,000 people. The DVD contains the full set from the home of Leeds United as well as highlights from the Kaiser Chiefs performance for the 2007 BBC Electric Proms.

Kaiser Chiefs set out on a UK tour in October 2008 with Castle Donington band Late of the Pier and The Hair. The tour started at Leeds Academy, a new venue where they were the first headlining band to play. Other dates included Manchester Academy, Southampton Guildhall, Reading Rivermead, Glasgow Barrowlands, Leicester De Montfort Hall and London Forum.

Kaiser Chiefs headed out on a UK Arena tour between February and March 2009, kicking off in Nottingham and ending in London. The tour visited Sheffield, Birmingham, Edinburgh, Aberdeen, Newcastle, Manchester, Liverpool, Cardiff and Dublin. This was the new album tour to promote Off with Their Heads. The band featured on several shows over Christmas 2008 including performing "Never Miss a Beat" with Girls Aloud on their TV Special and playing the same song on the Christmas Day edition of Top of the Pops.

On 16 July 2009, they played at Marés Vivas in Vila Nova de Gaia, Portugal as headliners on that day. They, along with Republic of Loose, opened for U2 in Croke Park in Dublin on 25 July 2009. They then opened for Green Day from 27 July to 7 August 2009, and the final shows before their 2-year hiatus were performed at Reading and Leeds Festival 2009.

=== The Future Is Medieval (2010–2011) ===
Following a hiatus, Kaiser Chiefs announced that they expected to release their fourth studio album in mid-2011. The album was recorded over a period of eighteen months at various locations including drummer Nick Hodgson's self-built east-London studio. The album's producers included Tony Visconti, Ethan Johns and Owen Morris, in addition to Nick Hodgson himself. On 3 June 2011, Kaiser Chiefs launched their new album from their website. Using a create-your-own album technique, fans were able to choose 10 out of 20 songs to create "their album" for £7.50; the band provides streams of roughly one minute to preview each track before selection. Many celebrities including, Radio One DJ Chris Moyles, The Guardian Newspaper, and frontman Ricky Wilson, created their own version of the album, donating the £1 reimbursement for each copy sold to the Alzheimer's Society.

On 27 June 2011, Kaiser Chiefs released an official track listing for the album, featuring 12 of the 20 available tracks and including a previously unheard track 'Kinda Girl You Are' which did not make the initial launch as it was not ready in time. They played two sell out comeback gigs at Falmouth Princess Pavilion. Then followed by appearances at Germany's Hurricane and Southside Festivals in June, Switzerland's Gurten Festival, Pinkpop in The Netherlands, Belgium's Rock Werchter, Portuguese festival Optimus Alive! in July, V Festival in August, Hard Rock Calling in June, the Isle of Wight Festival in June and at Terres Rouges Festival in Luxembourg in September. They also played at Tennants Vital in Bangor, Northern Ireland and in September they played two sold-out home town shows at Kirkstall Abbey in Leeds. They also be played in October in Festa das Latas, Coimbra – Portugal.

On 6 March 2012, the album was re-released under the title Start The Revolution Without Me for the US market. The track list differs significantly from the initial release, including the track "On The Run", which is exclusive to the US album and served as its lead single in early 2012.

=== Souvenir, Hodgson's departure (2012–2013) ===
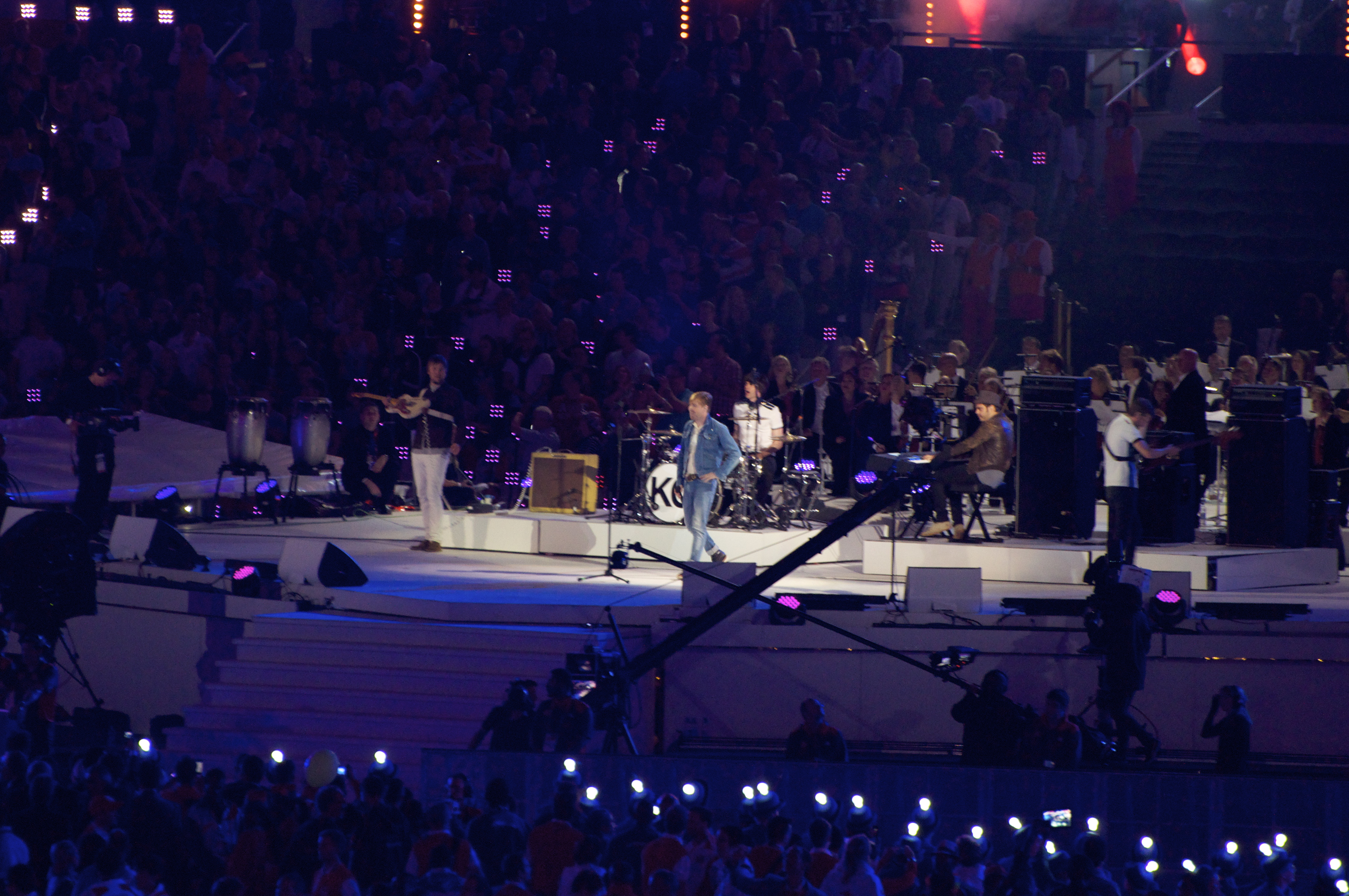
The Kaiser Chiefs performing "Pinball Wizard" at the London Summer Olympics closing ceremony in August 2012

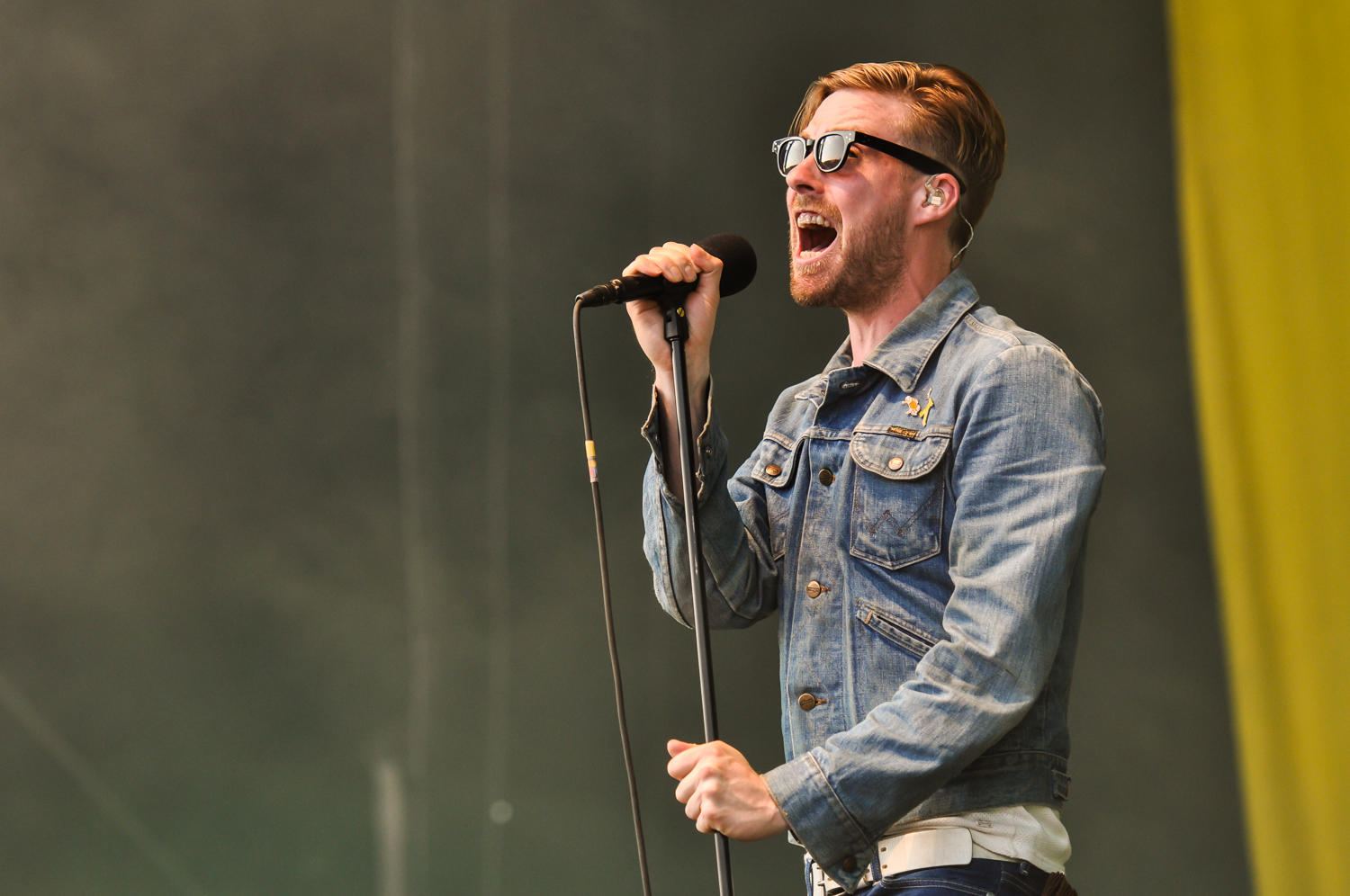
Ricky Wilson in concert in Germany in 2013

In early 2012, Kaiser Chiefs played a 20 date tour of the United Kingdom, followed by a tour of North America.

Kaiser Chiefs released their first compilation album, Souvenir: The Singles 2004–2012, in the UK on 4 June 2012. The album features all of the singles released by the band from 2004 to 2012, as well as a new track titled "Listen to Your Head".

Drummer Nick Hodgson announced on 4 December 2012 that he had left the band to concentrate on other projects. The band later issued a statement on their website confirming this. On 7 February 2013 it was announced that Vijay Mistry from the band Club Smith would be joining the Kaiser Chiefs as their new drummer. Hodgson later opined in a February 2025 retrospective interview with the Daily Mirror that the band should have disbanded instead of replacing him.

The band were one of two support bands for Green Day's one-off concert at the Emirates Stadium in London on 1 June 2013 along with All Time Low. The band's UK tour included 13 shows, beginning at Carlisle Sands Centre on 11 February and ending at London's O2 Academy Brixton on 1 March. The run of shows also includes gigs in Glasgow, Dunfermline, Manchester, Bridlington, Newcastle, Preston, Cheltenham, Wolverhampton, Southampton, Margate and Cambridge. They then went on to headline one of the Eden Sessions at the Eden Project, Cornwall. They played a hometown concert at the First Direct Arena in September 2013, being one of the first artists to perform at the new venue.

=== Education, Education, Education & War (2014–2015) ===
The band's fifth studio album, titled Education, Education, Education & War was released on 31 March 2014. Education, Education, Education & War is the first album featuring the new Kaiser Chiefs drummer, Vijay Mistry, after Nick Hodgson left the group in December 2012. The album was produced by Ben H. Allen III (who has previously worked with Gnarls Barkley, Animal Collective, and Deerhunter), and recorded at The Maze Studio in Atlanta. Three songs were co-written with Fraser T Smith (CeeLo Green, Adele). It was mixed by Michael Brauer (My Morning Jacket, Coldplay) at Electric Lady Studios in New York City in November 2013. On 5 December 2013, Kaiser Chiefs released a song titled "Misery Company" onto their SoundCloud account. The song had previously been performed live during the band's 2013 summer tour. On 3 January 2014, "Bows & Arrows" premiered on Rolling Stone magazine's website.

Education, Education, Education & War was toured across Europe and the Americas throughout 2014 and 2015.

In 2015, they supported the Foo Fighters during the South Africa, South America and Ireland legs of their Sonic Highways World Tour. They also released stand alone single 'Falling Awake' on 27 January 2015 via their YouTube channel.

=== Stay Together (2016–2017) ===
Stay Together, the band's sixth studio album, was released on 7 October 2016. It was co-written and produced by Brian Higgins, whose production company Xenomania has worked with the likes of Girls Aloud and Pet Shop Boys. The album's name is a reference to the song "We Stay Together". The first single from the album, "Parachute", was released on 14 June 2016. The second single, "Hole In My Soul" was released 18 August 2016 and the third and final single, "We Stay Together" was released on 9 December 2016.

This welcome return to the limelight saw ‘Stay Together’ push new boundaries to "take this nondescript sound and stuff it impressively full of sing-a-long hooks, covering topics including monogamy (We Stay Together) and shagging (Good Clean Fun)" as it marked an entirely new direction for the band, who went for a more dance-oriented sound. While Education, Education, Education and War was more focused on politics and the perils of war, the Kaiser Chiefs made the album with a focus on love and relationships. Wilson elaborated further on the stark contrast between this last album and 'Stay Together': "The thing about writing a protest album is it's straightforward. Only an idiot would disagree with you. You're just saying war is bad. But when you start talking about relationships like on this record it's harder because there's a lot more blurred line. There's no right or wrong."

The band performed a string of best of forest shows in the summer of 2016 as part the Forestry Commission's Forest Live series. Stay Together was toured across Europe in early 2017.

=== Duck (2018–2021) ===
The band signed with their original label Polydor Records for their seventh studio album, Duck, which released on 26 July 2019. For the album the band reunited with Ben H. Allen, the producer who worked on the band's 2014 album Education, Education, Education & War. The album was preceded by a UK tour in January and February, including concerts at London's O2 Academy Brixton and O2 Academy Birmingham, where several new songs from the album were premiered. The band also played a homecoming show at Elland Road in Leeds on 8 June 2019, which was also to celebrate 100 years of Leeds United.

The first single from the album, "Record Collection", was released on 23 May 2019, with "People Know How To Love One Another" released as a second single on 6 June 2019. "Golden Oldies" was released as the third single in October 2019. The album entered at number three in the UK album charts. Duck was later toured around arenas in the UK and Europe in early 2020, with all further touring cancelled due to the COVID-19 pandemic.

=== Kaiser Chiefs' Easy Eighth Album (2022–present) ===
In October 2022, the band announced the single "How 2 Dance", the first for V2 Records, which was released on 4 November. The song is part of their eighth album, Kaiser Chiefs' Easy Eighth Album, produced by Nile Rodgers and Amir Amor. The second single, "Jealousy", was released on 11 April 2023. The third single, "Feeling Alright", was released on 25 October 2023. The album was released on March 1, 2024. On 31 May 2025, during the band's 20th anniversary tour for Employment at Newsham Park, former drummer Nick Hodgson reunited with the band for a one-off performance of "Oh My God" as a co-guitarist and co-vocalist, with the band performing as a six-piece, Hodgson's first performance with the band in thirteen years.

== Awards and nominations ==
Year	Award	Category	Nominee(s)	Result	Ref.
2005	MTV Europe Music Awards	Best New Act	Themselves	Nominated	
2005	MTV Europe Music Awards	Best UK & Ireland Act	Themselves	Nominated	
2005	MTV Video Music Awards Japan	Best New Artist Video	"I Predict a Riot"	Nominated	
2005	Mercury Prize	Album of the Year	Employment	Nominated	
2005	NME Awards	Phillip Hall Radar Award	Themselves	Won	
2005	Popjustice £20 Music Prize	Best British Pop Single	"Everyday I Love You Less and Less"	Nominated	
2005	Q Awards	Best New Act	Themselves	Nominated	
2005	Q Awards	Best Album	Employment	Nominated	
2005	Žebřík Music Awards	Best International Surprise	Themselves	Nominated	
2006	Brit Awards	British Rock Act	Themselves	Won	
2006	Brit Awards	British Live Act	Themselves	Won	
2006	Brit Awards	British Group	Themselves	Won	
2006	Brit Awards	British Breakthrough Act	Themselves	Nominated	
2006	Brit Awards	British Album of the Year	Employment	Nominated	
2006	Ivor Novello Awards	Album Award	Employment	Won	
2006	Ivor Novello Awards	Best Contemporary Song	"I Predict a Riot"	Nominated	
2006	Meteor Music Awards	Best International Group	Themselves	Won	
2006	Meteor Music Awards	Best International Album	Employment	Won	
2006	NME Awards	Best British Band	Themselves	Nominated	
2006	NME Awards	Best Live Band	Themselves	Nominated	
2006	NME Awards	Best Track	"I Predict a Riot"	Nominated	
2006	NME Awards	Best Video	"I Predict a Riot"	Nominated	
2006	NME Awards	Best Music DVD	Enjoyment	Nominated	
2006	NME Awards	Best Album	Employment	Won	
2006	NME Awards	Best Dressed	Ricky Wilson	Won	
2006	Silver Clef Awards	Best British Act	Themselves	Won	
2007	Antville Music Video Awards	Best Narrative Video	"The Angry Mob"	Nominated	
2007	MVPA Awards	Best Narrative Video	"The Angry Mob"	Nominated	
2007	Q Awards	Best Album	Yours Truly, Angry Mob	Nominated	
2007	Q Awards	Best Track	"Ruby"	Nominated	
2007	Q Awards	Best Video	"Ruby"	Won	
2007	TMF Awards	Best International Rock	Themselves	Nominated	
2007	TMF Awards	Best International Live	Themselves	Nominated	
2007	Nickelodeon's UK Kids Choice Awards	Best Music Video	"Ruby"	Nominated	
2008	Brit Awards	British Group	Themselves	Nominated	
2008	Brit Awards	British Live Act	Themselves	Nominated	
2008	ECHO Awards	Best International Group	Themselves	Nominated	
2008	Ivor Novello Awards	Most Performed Work	"Ruby"	Nominated	
2008	NME Awards (USA)	Best International Alternative/Indie Live Act	Themselves	Nominated	
2008	NME Awards	Best Live Band	Themselves	Nominated	
2008	Q Awards	Best Live Act	Themselves	Won	
2008	UK Music Video Awards	Best Rock Video	"Love's Not a Competition (But I'm Winning)"	Nominated	
2009	MTV Australia Awards	Best Rock Video	"Never Miss a Beat"	Nominated	
2009	NME Awards	Best Music DVD	Live at Elland Road	Nominated	
2009	UK Music Video Awards	Best Music AD	Off with Their Heads	Nominated	
2011	BT Digital Music Awards	Best Artist Promotion	Kaiser Chiefs' The Future is Medieval album launch	Won	
2011	Q Awards	Q Innovation in Sound	Themselves	Won	
2012	D&AD Awards	Digital Solutions & Use of Social Media	The Kaiser Chiefs Bespoke Album Creation Experience	Yellow Pencil	
2012	D&AD Awards	Integrated	The Kaiser Chiefs Bespoke Album Creation Experience	Yellow Pencil	
2014	Q Awards	Best Track	"Coming Home"	Nominated	
2015	MTV Europe Music Awards	Best World Stage Performance	Themselves	Nominated	

== Band members ==
Current members

- Ricky Wilson – lead vocals, auxiliary percussion (1996–present)
- Andrew White – guitar, backing vocals (1996–present)
- Simon Rix – bass, backing vocals (2000–present)
- Nick Baines – keyboards, synthesizers, piano, organ (2000–present), guitar (2000–2003)
- Vijay Mistry – drums, percussion (2013–present)

Touring musicians

- Benjamin Witt – guitar (2025 Australian tour; substitute for Andrew White)

Former members

- Nick Hodgson – drums, percussion, acoustic guitar, backing and occasional lead vocals (1996–2012, 2025)

Timeline

== Discography ==
- 22 (as Parva, 2003)
- Employment (2005)
- Yours Truly, Angry Mob (2007)
- Off with Their Heads (2008)
- The Future Is Medieval (2011)
- Education, Education, Education & War (2014)
- Stay Together (2016)
- Duck (2019)
- Kaiser Chiefs' Easy Eighth Album (2024)

== Tours ==
- Employment Tour (2005–2006)
- Yours Truly, Angry Mob Tour (2007–2008)
- Off With Their Heads Tour (2008–2009)
- The Future is Medieval Tour (2011–2012)
- Souvenir Tour (2012–2013)
- Education, Education, Education & War Tour (2014–2015)
- Stay Together Tour (2016–2018)
- Duck Tour (2019–2021)
- All Together (2022)
- The Easy Eighth Tour (2024)
- 20 Years of Employment Tour (2025)
