= Nick Hodgson =

English musician (born 1977)

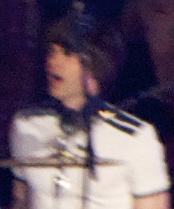
- Hodgson performing with the Kaiser Chiefs at the London Summer Olympics Closing Ceremony in August 2012

Background information
- Born: Nicholas James David Hodgson; 20 October 1977 (age 49); Leeds, England
- Genres: Indie rock; pop
- Occupations: Musician; songwriter
- Instruments: Drums; vocals; guitar; keyboards; bass; flute
- Years active: 1996–present
- Labels: B-Unique; Prediction
- Member of: Everyone Says Hi
- Formerly of: Kaiser Chiefs
- Website: www.predictionmusic.com

Nicholas James David Hodgson (born 20 October 1977) is an English musician and songwriter, formerly of the indie rock band Kaiser Chiefs and a member of the supergroup Everyone Says Hi since 2024. Hodgson also released a solo album, Tell Your Friends, under the moniker Nick J.D. Hodgson, in 2018 and continues to write songs for other artists.

== Early life ==
He attended St Mary's Catholic High School in Menston with Nick Baines and Simon Rix. He then went on to Leeds Trinity University in Horsforth, Leeds, where he studied Media. He later met Ricky Wilson and Andrew "Whitey" White at a mod night called Move on Up at The Underground in Leeds. Together they formed Runston Parva, later to be called Parva and now Kaiser Chiefs.

Together with bandmate Ricky Wilson, Hodgson started the Leeds club night Pigs "to give us something to look forward to". After giving the rest of the band a mix CD with songs he had been playing at Pigs, they formed Kaiser Chiefs, scrapping all their old songs and changing "the way we play, the way we dress, basically everything we could change without changing ... our faces".

== Kaiser Chiefs ==
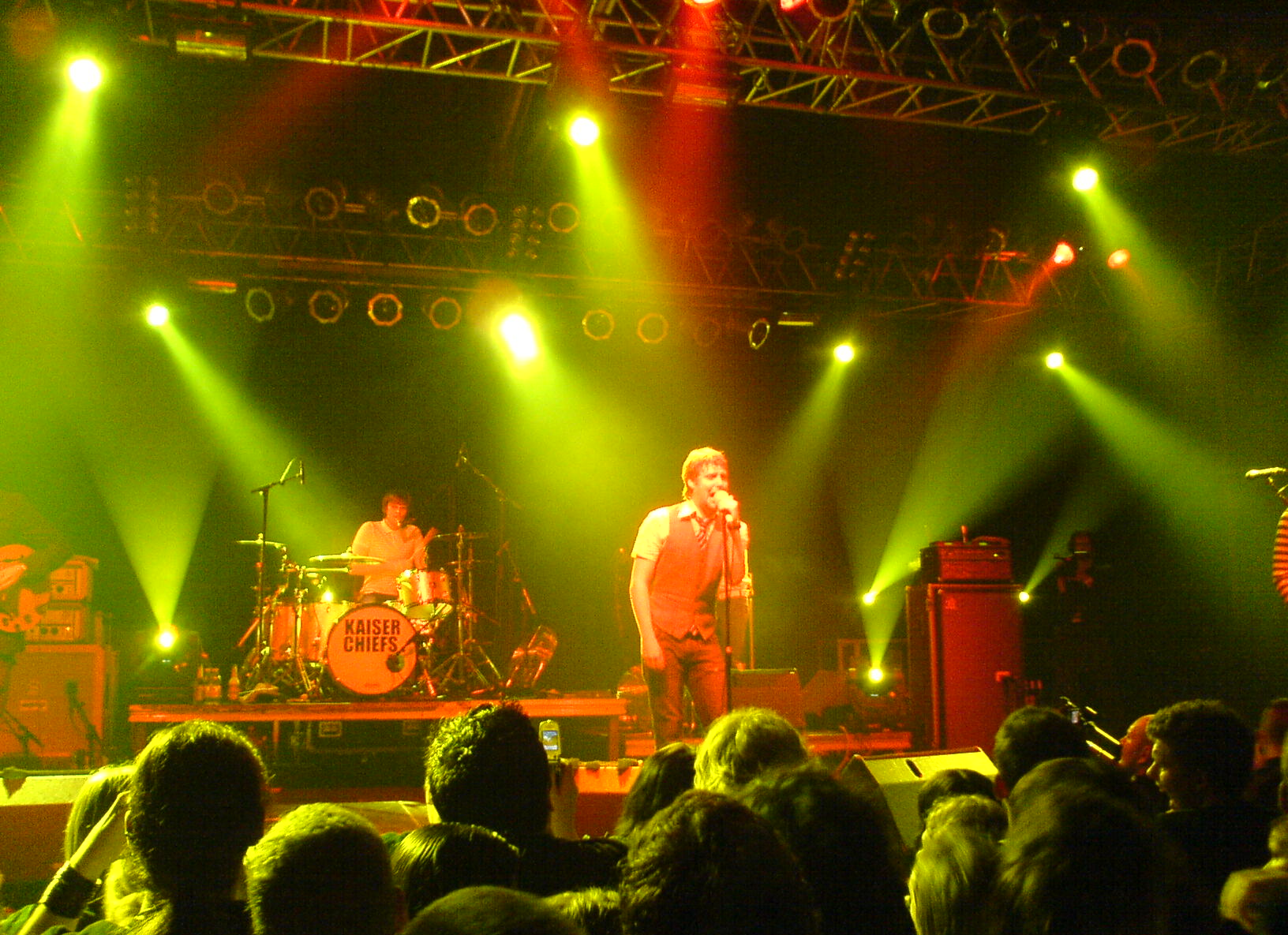
the Kaiser Chiefs performing in Munich, Germany in 2005

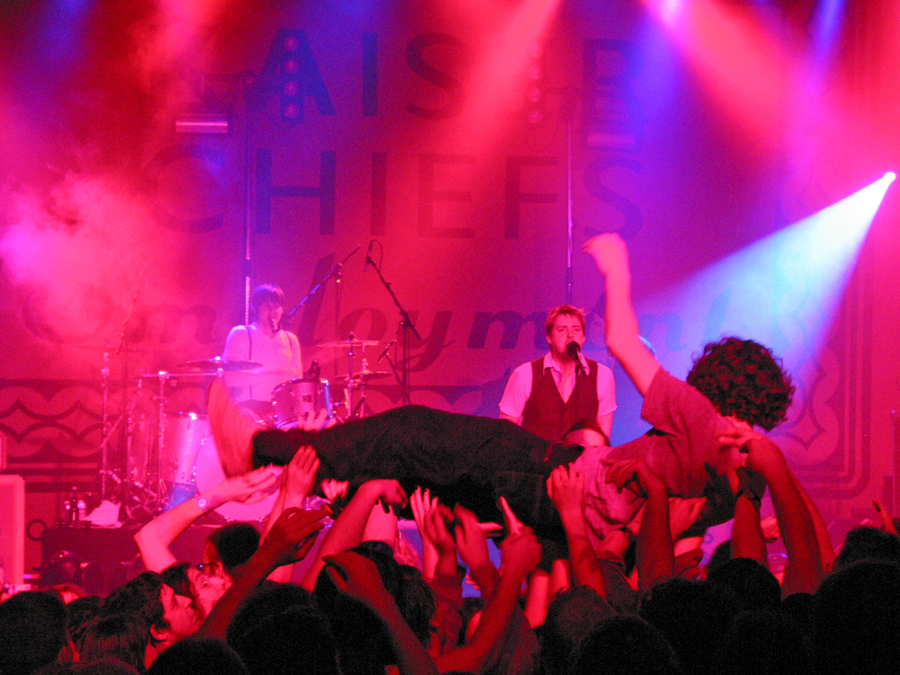
the Kaiser Chiefs performing in Neu-Isenburg in 2006

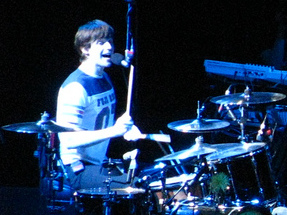
Hodgson performing with the Kaiser Chiefs in Santiago, Chile in 2008

Hodgson is a founding member of Leeds indie rock band Kaiser Chiefs, and their drummer and main backing vocalist between 1996 and 2012. He takes lead vocals on tracks "Boxing Champ" and "Man On Mars", as well as "Remember You're A Girl". He is the key writer of hits including "Ruby", "I Predict a Riot" and "Everyday I Love You Less and Less". Hodgson's brother Tim wrote additional lyrics on the track "If You Will Have Me" on his last album with the band, 2011's The Future Is Medieval. On 4 December 2012, Hodgson announced via his Twitter account that he had left the Kaiser Chiefs to concentrate on other projects. Hodgson's final gig with the band had earlier taken place headlining the Triumph Live festival at Mallory Park in Leicester on 1 September, while his last studio release with the band, a single titled "Listen to Your Head", was released in May. He was replaced by Vijay Mistry, previously of fellow Leeds band Club Smith (of whom toured with the Kaiser Chiefs in early 2012), itself a rebranding of The Hair (of whom also supported the Chiefs on select dates of their Off with Their Heads tour in 2008), in early 2013. Hodgson later opined in a February 2025 retrospective interview with the Daily Mirror that the band should have disbanded after he left instead of replacing him and continuing. Hodgson later participated in a one-off reunion with the band in May 2025 during their 20th anniversary tour for Employment at Newsham Park, joining the band for a performance of "Oh My God" as a co-guitarist and co-vocalist, with the band performing as a six-piece.

== Solo work and other ventures ==
Since his departure from the Kaiser Chiefs, Hodgson has refocused his attentions on the studio. In an interview with NME, he spoke of his decision to split from the band, stating: "It was obvious really, because they know I love the studio and I love writing and I'm not mad about touring. I loved touring at some point, but I didn't love it all the time and I didn't love it as much as everyone else."

On 26 March 2017, Hodgson teased via his Twitter account that he was making a solo record by tweeting "If I tweet that I'm making solo material then I have to do it. Right?!" On 1 June 2017 he confirmed the album also via Twitter saying the album was going "nice".

On 4 December 2017, Hodgson performed new material, at Black's Club, London, for "The Society of the Golden Slippers". This was stated as his debut performance as a solo artist.

On 26 January 2018, Hodgson released his solo album, Tell Your Friends, on Prediction Records. Much of the album is 1970s pop inspired in its sound, as Hodgson records on mostly 1970s instruments. As announced on his Twitter in late February 2018, Hodgson is already working on his second solo album. However, Hodgson confirmed in March 2020, that there is no plan to release new solo material in the near future, and he is instead continuing to focus on songwriting.

On 30 April 2024, the NME announced that Hodgson had formed a new band called "Everyone Says Hi", featuring members from The Kooks, Dead 60s and Howling Bells. The band's name was inspired by the 2002 David Bowie song, "Everyone Says 'Hi'". Their self-titled debut album was released on 31 January 2025 by Chrysalis Records. Everyone Says Hi released their second album, Funny Cos It's True, on 9 October 2026, which Hodgson recorded at his home studio and produced himself.

== Songwriting ==
After being the main songwriter in Kaiser Chiefs, Hodgson continues to write for other people. He co-wrote "Bang Bang Bang" with Mark Ronson, MNDR and Q-Tip, which was released as the lead single from Ronson's third studio album, Record Collection, and went to No. 6 in the UK Singles Chart. Hodgson has worked with The Vamps, Kodaline, Olly Murs, Nina Nesbitt, Lower Than Atlantis, John Newman, Hurts, Dagny and James Arthur. He worked with Duran Duran and producer Mark Ronson on the Duran Duran album All You Need Is Now, co-writing the track "Too Bad You're So Beautiful". He has also written for Dame Shirley Bassey. He co-wrote the lead song, "Feels Like Summer" for the Oscar, Golden Globe and BAFTA-nominated film, Shaun the Sheep Movie (2015). Hodgson co-wrote and co-produced the 2017 single "Laidback" by Rat Boy. He co-wrote the 2020 hit "Like It Is" with singer-songwriter Dua Lipa, Ritual member Gerard O'Connell and Patrick Martin, which was originally intended for Lipa to record for her 2017 self-titled debut album but didn't make the final cut, where a snippet of the song was leaked on Lipa's Instagram page on 16 May 2019 before the full song was leaked on 26 May, before the song was ultimately bought by Norwegian DJ and producer Kygo, who invited Swedish singer-songwriter Zara Larsson and American rapper Tyga to collaborate with him on the finalised version, which appears on his third studio album Golden Hour.

== Personal life ==
Hodgson is married, and has one child. His father, entrepreneur Kenneth Hodgson, died in 2011 at the age of 60 of Alzheimer's disease. He has a brother, Tim, who is a property investor.

== Discography ==
Studio albums

=== Kaiser Chiefs ===
- 22 (as Parva, 2003)
- Employment (2005)
- Yours Truly, Angry Mob (2007)
- Off with Their Heads (2008)
- The Future Is Medieval (2011)

=== Everyone Says Hi ===
- Everyone Says Hi (2025)
- Funny Cos It's True (2026)

=== Solo ===
- Tell Your Friends (as Nick J.D. Hodgson, 2018)
