= Ricky Wilson (singer) =

English musician, painter and media personality (born 1978)

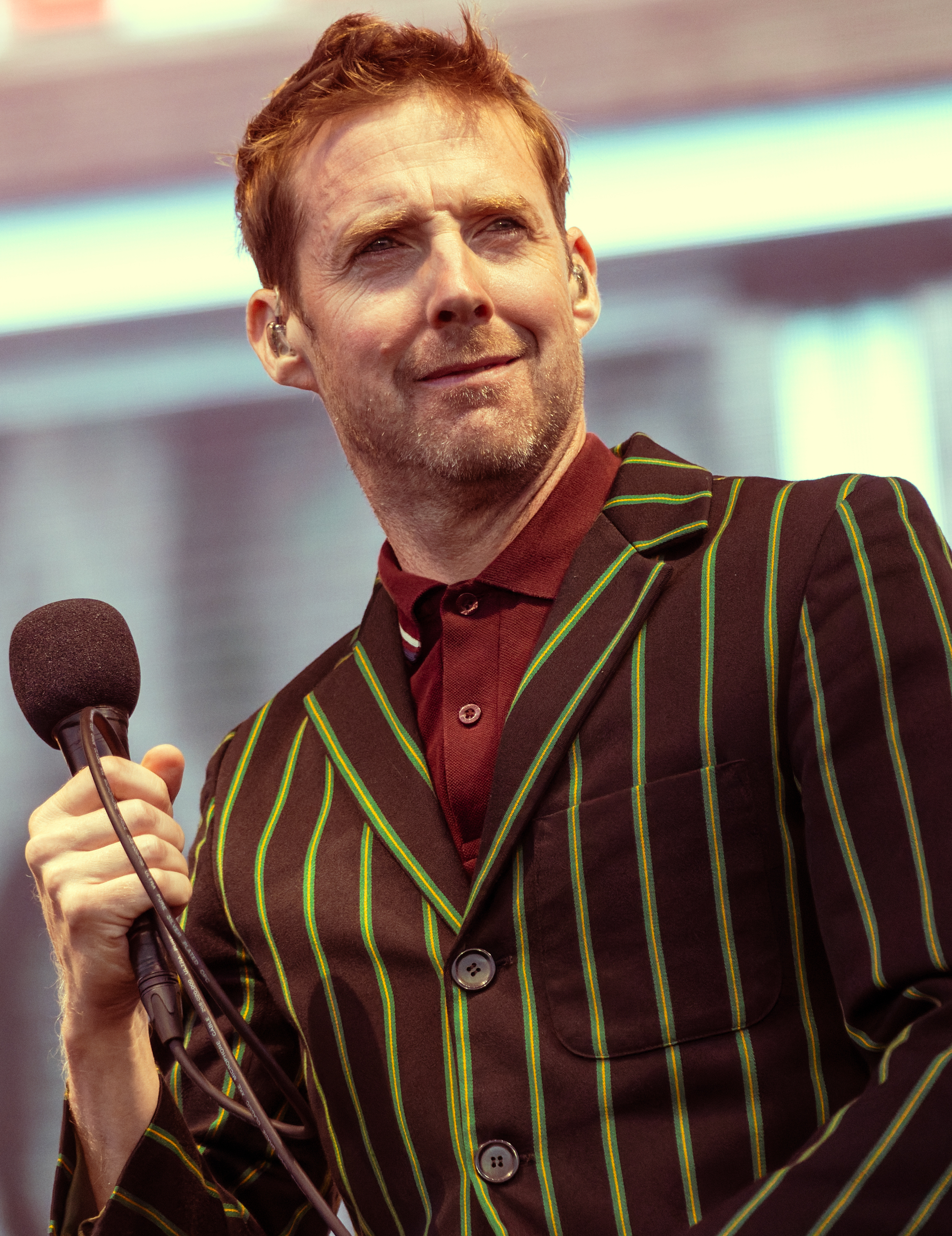
- Wilson performing with the Kaiser Chiefs in 2025

Background information
- Born: Charles Richard Wilson; 17 January 1978 (age 48); Keighley, West Yorkshire, England
- Genres: Indie rock; new wave; post-punk revival
- Occupations: Singer; songwriter; television personality; radio presenter
- Instruments: Vocals; percussion
- Years active: 1996–present
- Member of: Kaiser Chiefs
- Spouse: Grace Zito (m. 2021)

Charles Richard Wilson (born 17 January 1978) is an English musician and the frontman of five-piece rock band Kaiser Chiefs. He was a coach on The Voice UK from the third to the fifth series, being the first coach to win two years consecutively. He is also a painter.

== Early life ==
Wilson was born in Keighley, West Yorkshire, to Glynne Wilson and TV producer Geoff Wilson. He has one brother, James.

He attended Leeds Grammar School after Ghyll Royd primary school, and later attended Leeds Metropolitan University and completed his BA (Hons) degree in Graphic Arts and Design in 2000 before undertaking his master's degree in Art and Design. He then taught at Leeds College of Art and Design for a year before the band's big break.

== Career ==
Wilson, with Nick Hodgson and Andrew White, formed the band Runston Parva. After the group failed to land a record deal, the band shortened their name to Parva, following their return from university. The band landed a record deal; they were later dropped following the closure of Mantra Recordings. They had just recently released their debut album 22 and their first three singles.

Following this, the group decided to rebrand for the third time, with intentions to sign a new long-term record label and release new musical material, now renamed Kaiser Chiefs. Their name was adapted from the South African football team Kaizer Chiefs. James Sandom became their new manager and they soon signed a recording contract with B-Unique Records.

== Outside music ==
=== The Voice UK ===
On 19 September 2013, Wilson confirmed he would replace Danny O'Donoghue as a coach on the third series of The Voice UK alongside will.i.am, Tom Jones, and fellow new coach Kylie Minogue, who replaced Jessie J. During the series, Katy B appeared as Wilson's team mentor. For the fourth series, Wilson appeared alongside Tom Jones, will.i.am and Rita Ora. He was named the winning coach during the 4 April 2015 live final when Stevie McCrorie won the public vote. The following year, he again appeared alongside will.i.am with new coaches, Boy George and Paloma Faith. On 9 April 2016, he became winning coach for the second time when Kevin Simm won the fifth series. The final pitted Team Ricky against Team Ricky with both of Wilson's acts knocking the other coaches out of the live final. The win made him the Voice UK coach with the most wins. He left the show prior to its move to ITV.

=== Media work ===
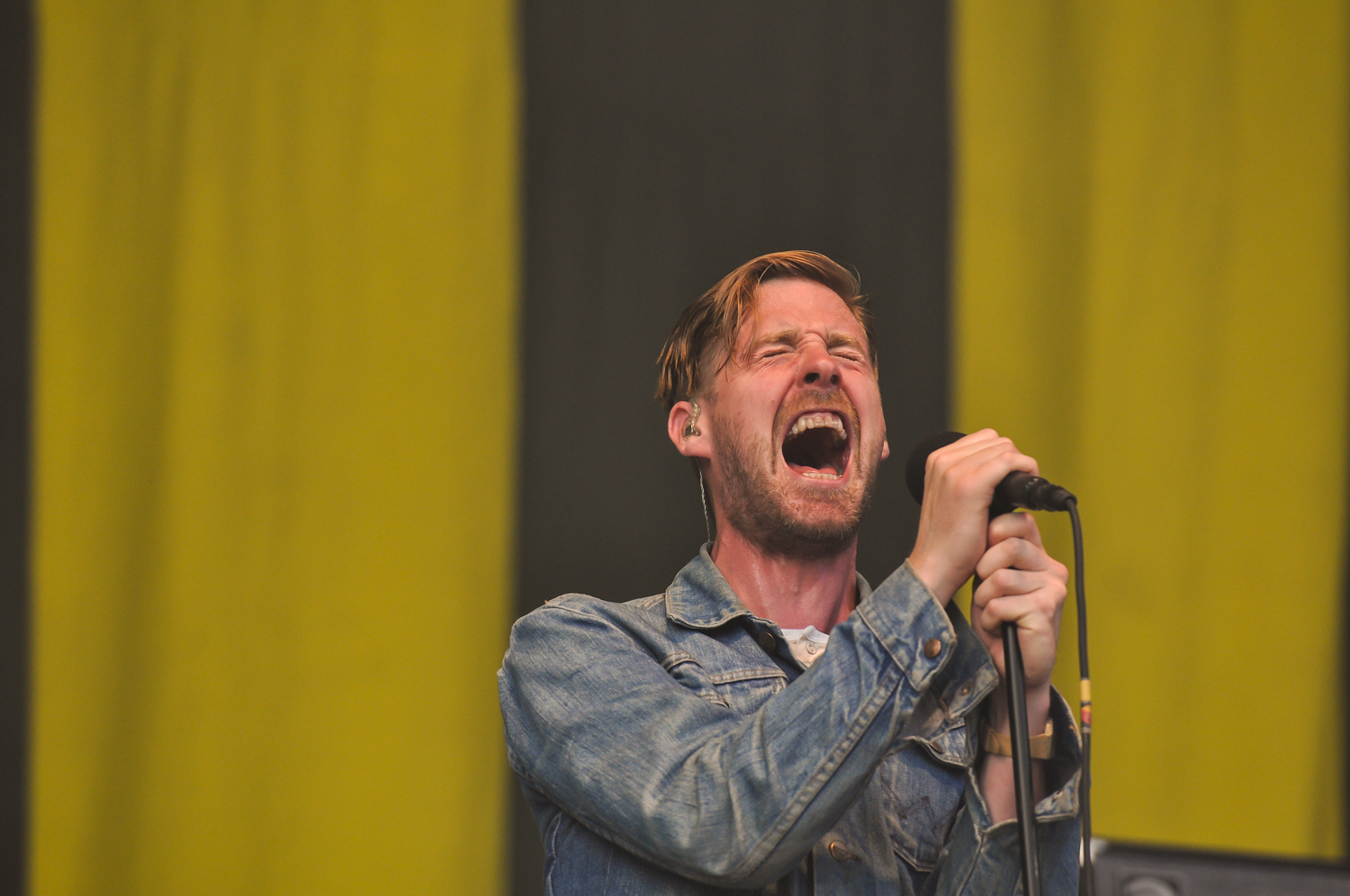
Wilson performing with Kaiser Chiefs in July 2013

Wilson has twice been a guest on the BBC Two television show, Never Mind the Buzzcocks, firstly in 2005 as a panellist and then as a guest host in 2006. He also featured on the panel of the BBC Television comedy series, Shooting Stars, in 2009. In 2008, he appeared in Peter Kay's talent show parody, Peter Kay's Britain's Got the Pop Factor... and Possibly a New Celebrity Jesus Christ Soapstar Superstar Strictly on Ice, in a duet with the show's protagonist, Geraldine McQueen. Wilson had a minor role in St Trinian's 2: The Legend of Fritton's Gold, as the rock star boyfriend of Sarah Harding's character, Roxy. Wilson stated on his Radio X show that he was cast to appear in Harry Potter and the Deathly Hallows – Part 1 fronting a wizard band made up of actual musicians. When the band was replaced with CGI instruments, he was invited instead to appear in a background role. It is popularly believed that he had a cameo as Dirk Cresswell, but Wilson himself has denied this, saying the character identified as Dirk is in fact played by an unnamed actor. Between November 2012 and January 2013, Wilson took on the role of the Artilleryman in the staged musical, Jeff Wayne's Musical Version of The War of the Worlds – The New Generation. Wilson and Kaiser Chiefs bassist Simon Rix wrote and performed the theme tune for Zig and Zag. Wilson joined new radio station Radio X in September 2015 where he presented the Sunday morning show from 11 am to 2 pm. He left in 2017 due to other commitments

In October 2015, Wilson became the host of Sky 1's music and comedy panel show Bring the Noise. He appeared on the show opposite former The X Factor judge and The Pussycat Dolls singer Nicole Scherzinger, stand-up comedian Joel Dommett, rapper Tinie Tempah and comedian Katherine Ryan. However, in April 2016, it was announced that the show had been cancelled after just one series due to declining ratings.

In 2017, he appeared as a guest on The Grand Tour, a motoring programme presented by Jeremy Clarkson, Richard Hammond and James May.

In 2018, Ricky became patron of MAS Records, part of Kidderminster College, alongside Robert Plant.

In 2020, Wilson launched a new series of podcasts with veteran English DJ Tony Blackburn entitled Ricky and Tony's Pop Detectives. In the series Wilson and Blackburn try to ascertain whether or not long rumoured myths and claims surrounding pop stars lives and their music are true. The series launched to positive reviews and a second series was released later in the year.

In 2020, Wilson used his art skills to present an art episode of CBBC series Celebrity Supply Teacher.

In 2021, he went on to host his own series on CBBC, Ricky Wilson’s Art Jam. The same year Wilson was also cast as the narrator in the UK animated show Dodo. Also in this year, BBC Radio 2 gave him his own series called Ricky Wilson's Rock And Roll Classics, which ran for two series in 2021 and 2022, and which featured Wilson playing his favourite songs from the 1950s and early 60s.

In 2022, making use of his art background further he co-presented CBBC series Britain’s Best Young Artist alongside Vick Hope.

He became the host of the Virgin Radio UK Drivetime show on 9 January 2023.

In 2023, Wilson took part in series 4 of The Masked Singer as "Phoenix", where he finished in second place, behind Busted singer Charlie Simpson.

Wilson painted Lindsay McKenna, who runs a rescue centre for exotic animals, for a 2026 episode of the BBC television series Extraordinary Portraits.

Wilson currently participates in the twenty-sixth series of I'm a Celebrity...Get Me Out of Here!, which premiered on 16 November 2026 on ITV.

== Personal life ==
During the early days of Kaiser Chiefs, Wilson was well known for wearing stripy blazers, waistcoats, turn-up jeans, and winkle picker shoes, a style that won him the Shockwaves NME Award For Best Dressed Person in 2006. Lately, he has adopted a more casual dress code. Wilson is well known for his energetic stage presence, climbing scaffolding, standing on the safety barrier, and at times crowd surfing. Of crowd surfing, Wilson says he likes to "get out and see the crowd, see what they smell like". Such exploits have occasionally resulted in injury, such as torn ankle ligaments after jumping off stage during a concert in Portugal.

In May 2006, Wilson was a victim of a hit-and-run accident in Leeds. He was hit by a car while attempting to walk on a pedestrian crossing, suffering bruising and a broken toe owing to a 'Ricky trademark jump' which resulted in him hitting the windscreen and being flipped over the top of the vehicle rather than trapped underneath.

Wilson began a relationship with celebrity stylist Grace Zito in early 2015. They became engaged in April 2018 and married in June 2021. In April 2022, they had twins.

Wilson and the band are supporters of Amnesty International and Nordoff-Robbins music therapy.

== Filmography ==
Self credits
Year	Title	Role	Notes
2005	The Friday Night Project	Himself	Guest appearance – with Kaiser Chiefs
2005, 2017, 2021, 2024	Ant & Dec's Saturday Night Takeaway	Himself	Guest appearance – with Kaiser Chiefs
2005	The Late Late Show with Craig Ferguson	Himself	Musical guest appearance – with Kaiser Chiefs
2005	Popworld	Himself	Guest appearance – with Kaiser Chiefs
2005	Kaiser Chiefs: Enjoyment	Himself	Short video
2005	Never Mind the Buzzcocks	Himself	Guest presenter
2006	Never Mind the Buzzcocks	Himself	Guest presenter
2006	Top of the Pops	Himself	Guest appearance
2006	Later...with Jools Holland	Himself	Interview appearance (solo)
2007	Later...with Jools Holland	Himself	Interview appearance (solo)
2007	Brit Awards	Himself	Guest appearance – with Kaiser Chiefs
2007	Friday Night with Jonathan Ross	Himself	2 guest appearances Interview appearance (solo) Interview appearance – with Kaiser Chiefs
2009	Shooting Stars	Himself	Guest appearance (solo)
2009	St Trinian's 2: The Legend of Fritton's Gold	Rockstar	Actor
2011	Breakfast	Himself	TV interview; later musical performance – with Kaiser Chiefs
2012	Jeff Wayne's Musical Version of The War of the Worlds – The New Generation	The Artilleryman	Actor
2014–2016	The Voice UK	Himself	Main cast; coach/judge; 45 episodes (solo)
2014	The Voice: Louder on Two	Himself	5 episodes; guest appearances
2014–2018	Celebrity Juice	Himself	6 episodes; guest appearances
2015	Bring the Noise	Himself	Main presenter (solo)
2015–	The One Show	Himself	Guest presenter (4 episodes)
2017	The Grand Tour	Himself, guest	Celebrity Face Off, Series 2 Episode 1
2018	The Great Stand Up To Cancer Bakeoff	Himself	Contestant, Episode 2
2024	Michael McIntyre's Big Show	Himself	Unexpected Star of the Show
2025	The Wheel	Himself	Celebrity expert
2026	I'm a Celebrity...Get Me Out of Here!	Himself	Contestant, Series 16
2026	House of Games	Himself	Contestant, Series 10, Week 7
