= B-Unique Records =

British record label and publishing company

B-Unique Records & B-Unique Publishing
- Founded: 2001
- Founder: Mark Lewis, Martin Toher
- Distributor: AWAL
- Genre: Various
- Country of origin: UK
- Official website: http://www.b-uniquerecords.com/

B-Unique Records is a London-based record label, and publishing company founded in 2001 by Mark Lewis and Martin Toher. It is one of the UK’s most successful independent labels.

B-Unique's current roster includes Irish indie-folk trio Kingfishr, Jon “‘Maggs” Maguire, (Calum Scott), Robert Harvey (The Music), Punctual, TikTok twins Altego, singer-songwriter Benjamin Steer and Iona Luke. Other artists include, John Newman, Kodaline, James Bay, Benjamin Francis Leftwich, Luke Sital Singh and writers Johnny McDaid (Ed Sheeran / Snow Patrol) Ian Broudie, Samuel Preston, John Power, Liam O'Donnell, Jonny Coffer, Anders Grahn, and James Flannigan

The label has enjoyed huge success in both records and publishing notably Kaiser Chiefs, The Twang, The Automatic, The Ordinary Boys and Aqualung. Billion streaming copyrights include Shape of You (Johnny McDaid/Ed Sheeran), You are the Reason (Jon Maguire/ Calum Scott) and All I Want (Kodaline). Also released on the label to critical acclaim: Primal Scream, Fenech Soler, Mull Historical Society, Leaves, Alkaline Trio, Hot Hot Heat, Saves The Day, Rocket from the Crypt, Bedouin Soundclash, Har Mar Superstar and Coheed and Cambria.

Before launching B-Unique Toher signed artists including Therapy?, The Bluetones, Dodgy and Cud to A&M. Mark Lewis as Head of A&R at Polygram Music and London Records signed Echo & the Bunnymen, Cast, Alisha's Attic and many others.

== Roster ==
- Kodaline
- James Bay
- John Newman
- Darlia
- The Mispers
- Port Isla
- Ian Broudie
- John Power
- Samuel Preston
- Liam O'Donnell
- Benjamin Francis Leftwich
- Luke Sital Singh
- Anders Grahn
- Grace Tither
- Ralph Pellymounter
- James Flannigan
- Dave Lofts

== Former artists ==
- Alkaline Trio
- Alterkicks
- Aqualung
- The Automatic
- Bedouin Soundclash
- Coheed and Cambria
- Fenech Soler
- Gay Dad
- Har Mar Superstar
- Hot Hot Heat
- Kaiser Chiefs
- Leaves
- Millionaires
- Mull Historical Society
- The Ordinary Boys
- Saves the Day
- Spunge
- Rocket From The Crypt
- The Twang
- Pull Tiger Tail

== Publication ==
- Girls' Generation – "Karma Butterfly" (Japanese Language non-title track)

== See also ==
- Lists of record labels
- List of independent UK record labels
