= Andrew White (guitarist) =

English guitarist (born 1974)

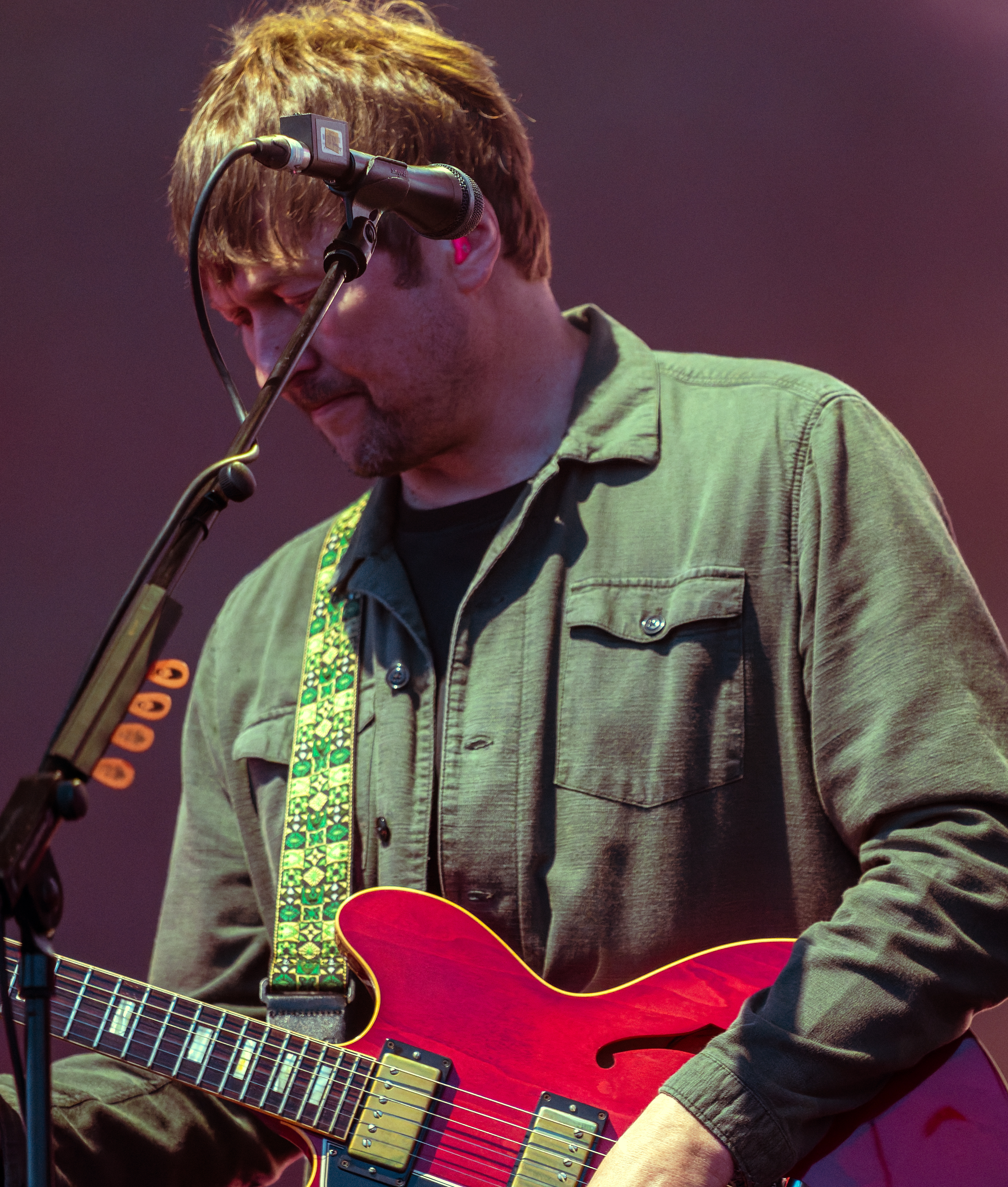
- White performing with the Kaiser Chiefs in 2025

Background information
- Also known as: Whitey
- Born: Andrew Robert White; 28 August 1974 (age 52); Leeds, England
- Origin: Leeds, England
- Genres: Indie rock, alternative rock
- Occupations: Musician, songwriter
- Instruments: Guitar, vocals
- Years active: 1996–present
- Member of: Kaiser Chiefs

Andrew Robert White (born 28 August 1974), also known as Whitey, is the guitarist of the English indie rock band Kaiser Chiefs.

== Biography ==
Whitey was born 28 August 1974 in Leeds. He is a former student of Garforth Community College and Leeds Metropolitan University. He is left-handed.

He is an original member of the band Runston Parva, which later became Parva, changing the name to Kaiser Chiefs in 2004. The name was adapted from Kaizer Chiefs, the former club of Lucas Radebe who was at the time with Leeds United.
