= The Pigeon Detectives discography =

Discography of English rock band The Pigeon Detectives

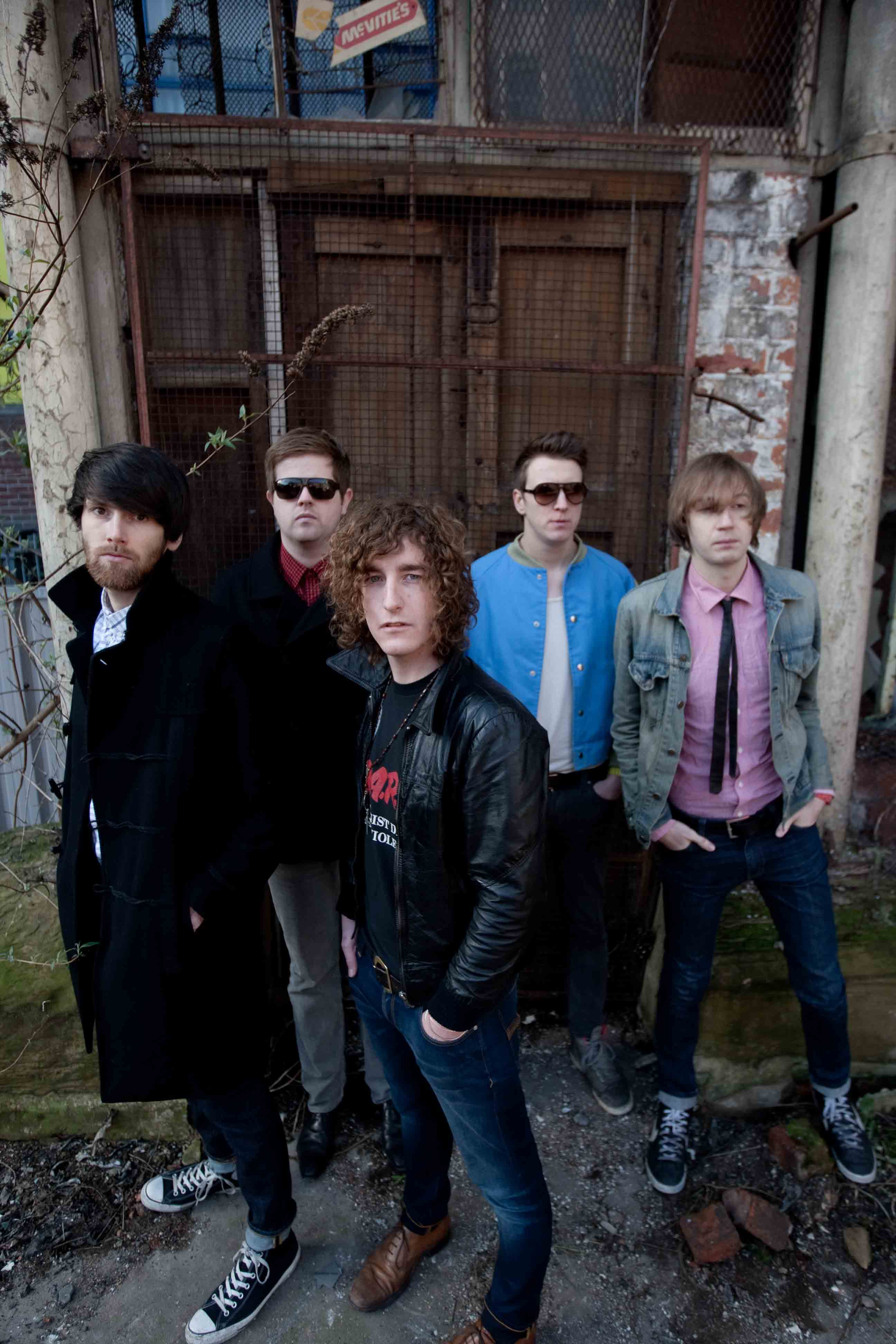
- The Pigeon Detectives in 2011
- Studio albums: 6
- Singles: 11
- Music videos: 5

This article gives the discography for the British rock band The Pigeon Detectives. Since their formation in 2004 they have released six studio albums and 11 singles that have charted in the top 40 of the UK Singles Chart.

The band released their debut album, Wait for Me, in summer 2007 to critical acclaim and it sold well, reaching number 3 on the UK Albums Chart. Four singles were released from the album: "I Found Out" was first released in 2006 and re-released a year later; "Take Her Back" (number 20), "Romantic Type" (number 19) and "I'm Not Sorry" (number 12) all charted in the top 20.

In 2008 the Pigeon Detectives released their second album, Emergency and released the single "This Is an Emergency", which charted at number 14. They have also released the single "Everybody Wants Me", which peaked at number 51. "Say It Like You Mean It" was the last single from the album.

On 1 February 2011, the Pigeon Detectives announced their third album Up, Guards and at 'Em!, which was released on 4 April 2011. The album's lead single, "Done in Secret", was released on 28 March 2011.

== Albums ==
Album	Album details	Peak chart positions						Certifications
Album	Album details	UK	UK Ind.	FRA	IRL	NED	SCO	Certifications
Wait for Me	Released: 28 May 2007; Label: Dance to the Radio; Formats: CD, digital download, streaming	3	1	—	—	54	2	BPI: Platinum
Emergency	Released: 26 May 2008; Label: Dance to the Radio; Formats: CD, digital download, streaming	5	1	189	69	— (Note: Emergency did not enter the Dutch Album Top 100, but entered the Dutch Alternative Top 30 chart at number 23.)	5	BPI: Gold
Up, Guards and at 'Em!	Released: 4 April 2011; Label: Dance to the Radio; Formats: CD, digital download, streaming	30	8	—	—	—	43	
We Met at Sea	Released: 29 April 2013; Label: Cooking Vinyl; Formats: CD, digital download, streaming	41	7	—	—	—	56	
Broken Glances	Released: 24 February 2017; Label: Dance to the Radio; Formats: CD, digital download, streaming	(Note: Broken Glances did not enter the UK Albums Chart, but peaked at number 65 on the UK Album Downloads Chart.) 102	9	—	—	—	—	
TV Show	Released: 7 July 2023; Label: Dance to the Radio; Formats: CD, digital download, streaming	30	2	—	—	—	18	
"—" denotes a recording that did not chart or was not released in that territory.

== Singles ==
List of singles, with chart positions, showing year released and album name
Single	Year	Peak chart positions				Certifications	Album
Single	Year	UK	UK Indie	POL	SCO	Certifications	Album
"You Know I Love You"	2006	93	9	—	67		Wait for Me
"I Found Out"	2006	39	1	—	42	BPI: Silver	Wait for Me
"Romantic Type"	2007	19	2	—	18		Wait for Me
"I'm Not Sorry"	2007	12	1	40	14		Wait for Me
"Take Her Back"	2007	20	1	—	14	BPI: Silver	Wait for Me
"I Found Out" (re-release)	2007	42	1	—	28	BPI: Silver	Wait for Me
"This Is an Emergency"	2008	14	1	44	12		Emergency
"Everybody Wants Me"	2008	51	3	—	21		Emergency
"Say It Like You Mean It"	2008	161	3	—	16		Emergency
"Done in Secret"	2011	— (Note: "Done in Secret" did not enter the UK Singles Chart, but peaked at number 63 on the UK Physical Singles Chart Top 100.)	42	—	—		Up, Guards and at 'Em!
"Lost"	2011	—	—	—	—		Up, Guards and at 'Em!
"Animal"	2013	—	—	—	—		We Met at Sea
"I Won't Come Back"	2013	—	—	—	—		We Met at Sea
"Sounding the Alarm"	2016	—	—	—	—		Broken Glances
"Lose Control"	2016	—	—	—	—		Broken Glances
"Lovers Come and Lovers Go"	2023	—	—	—	—		TV Show
"Falling to Pieces"	2023	—	—	—	—		TV Show
"Summer Girl"	2023	—	—	—	—		TV Show
"—" denotes a recording that did not chart or was not released in that territory.
