= Grammatics discography =

- Studio albums: 1
- Extended plays: 2
- Live albums: 0
- Compilation albums: 0
- Singles: 6
- Video albums: 0
- Music videos: 4

This article gives the discography for the British indie rock band Grammatics. Since their formation in 2006 they have released one studio album, six singles, and two EPs.

== Early EP and releases (2007–2008) ==
The band first commercial release was a track entitled "The Shipping Forecast" on the Dance To The Radio label third compilation CD. The Various Artists - Something I Learned Today CD, also made available as a digital download, was released on 2 April 2007.The Shipping Forecast was the first track on the CD which comprised other promising bands signed to the Leeds label such as Sky Larkin, Laura Groves a.k.a.Blue Roses and This et Al among others.

The band then went on to release a Japan only four track EP,Verity and Reverie on 11 August 2007 on the Japanese label Klee 500 EP Club Rallye label. This was followed by another appearance on the fourth DTTR compilation CD, entitled Out of the Woods and Trees released 1 October 2007. The song The Manageress, already featured on the "Verity and Reverie" EP was track listed at number 7.Other notable bands on the CD included the commercially successful Pigeon Detectives, Howling Bells and Forward Russia.

Later that month, the band's first single, "Shadow Committee" was released worldwide as a 7" vinyl and digital download. The B side to "Shadow Committee" was "Broken Wing", another song already featured on the Verity and Reverie EP. Owen Brinley wrote and sang the song "Broken Wings" before Grammatics formed in 2006.

A second single followed in April 2008. The double A side contained songs "D.I.L.E.M.M.A." and "Polar Swelling". It was released worldwide as a 10" vinyl and digital download. A video of "D.I.L.E.M.M.A" directed by Marcus Macaulay was made and got air play on MTV2 while BBC Radio 1 DJ Huw Stephens was the first one play "D.I.L.E.M.M.A".

August 2008 saw the release of a free download only single called "New Franchise" available from the band's website. The video was shot by Matt Maude at the end of July late at night in the forest of Otley Chevin.

With the album due for release at the beginning of 2009, the band issued another single in November 2008. "The Vague Archive" became available as a 7" vinyl. A side was the title track itself "The Vague Archive" while the B side was to be a remix of the same track: "The Vague Archive (AntEater Remix)". The Vague Archive video was also directed by Matt Maude and reached number 3 in the MTV2 playlist.

=== Track listing ===
==== Verity and Reverie EP ====
1. The Vague Archive
2. The Manageress
3. The Shipping Forecast
4. Kicking Crutches

Kicking Crutches featured brass by Napoleon IIIrd.
Rebecca Dumican played cello and sang backing vocals on the E.P.

==== Shadow Committee (single) ====
A Shadow Committee
B Broken Wings

==== D.I.L.E.M.M.A. (single) ====
A D.I.L.E.M.M.A.
A Polar Swelling

==== The Vague Archive (single) ====
A The Vague Archive
B The Vague Archive (AntEater Remix)

== Grammatics album and subsequent releases (2009) ==
Shadow Committee was re-released as a 7" vinyl single a week before the eponymous debut album. A side was the title track Shadow Committee while the B side contained the previously unreleased track Time Capsules and the Greater Truth which would also be the vinyl LP bonus track. The video for the single, released in February 2009, was this time directed by Blake Claridge. That same week, Shadow Committee was voted single of the week on the Stuart Maconie and Mark Radcliffe show on BBC Radio 2.

The band's first album, Grammatics, came out on 23 March to much critical acclaim. It was made available as a digital download, a standard CD, and a double 12" gatefold vinyl.

In July 2009, the download only Murderer EP was released. The track list included six tracks, two of which were different remixes of the song "Murderer" plus a specially recorded French version of the song.

To celebrate the start of their support stint for Bloc Party on their Bloctober tour, the band released a new song as a single in October 2009 as a digital download and 7" vinyl. Double Negative is backed by a cover version of "Note in His Pockets" by The Good Life. The Good Life is a side project for Cursive frontman and main songwriter Tim Kasher.

Also to coincide with the start of the Bloctober tour, another Murderer remix was made available free from the band's website: "Murderer (Gavron remix)".

=== Track listing ===
==== Shadow Committee (single re-release) ====
A Shadow Committee
B Time Capsules and the Greater Truth

==== Grammatics Album ====
1. The Shadow Committee
2. D.I.L.E.M.M.A
3. Murderer
4. The Vague Archive
5. Broken Wing
6. Relentless Fours
7. Inkjet Lakes
8. Polar Swelling
9. Rosa Flood
10. Cruel Tricks of the Light
11. Swan Song
Bonus:
12. Time Capsules and the Greater Truth
13. Double Negative
14. Kicking Crutches
15. Murderer [French version]

==== Murderer EP ====
1. Murderer
2. The New Sobriety
3. Kicking Crutches
4. Murderer (French version)
5. Murderer (Cale Parks remix)
6. Murderer (Requesters remix)

==== Double Negative ====
A Double Negative
B Notes in His Pockets

==== KRUPT EP ====
1. Stalinesque
2. Mutant Reverb
3. Church of the Great I Am
4. Cedars Sinai
5. KRUPT

== Albums ==
| Year | Album | Album Details | UK Indie |
|---|---|---|---|
| 2009 | Grammatics | *released: 23 March *format:CD, LP, DD*label:DTTR | |

== Singles ==
| Year | Title | Album | UK Indie |
|---|---|---|---|
| 2007 | Shadow Committee | Grammatics | |
| 2007 | D.I.L.E.M.M.A. | Grammatics | |
| 2007 | New Franchise | Grammatics | |
| 2007 | Vague Archive | Grammatics | |
| 2008 | Shadow Committee | Grammatics | |
| 2008 | Murderer | Grammatics | |
| 2008 | Double Negative | Grammatics | |

== Music videos ==
| Year | Title | Director |
|---|---|---|
| 2007 | D.I.L.E.M.M.A. | Marcus Macaulay |
| 2007 | New Franchise | Matt Maude |
| 2007 | "The Vague Archive" | Matt Maude |
| 2008 | Shadow Committee | Blake Claridge |
