= Belladrum Tartan Heart Festival =

Music and arts festival in Scotland

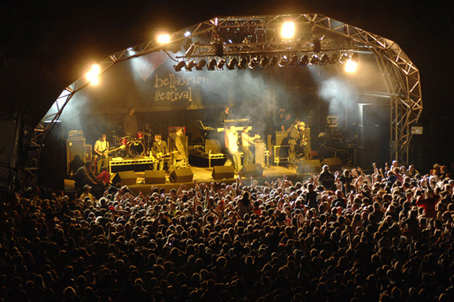
- Genre: Alternative, indie, folk
- Dates: Second weekend in August
- Locations: Kiltarlity, Scotland
- Years active: 2004 - present
- Capacity: 25,000
- Website: http://www.tartanheartfestival.co.uk

The Belladrum Tartan Heart Festival is an annual music and arts festival, held on the Belladrum Estate in Kiltarlity, Scotland. The festival was founded in 2004. In 2022 it attracted 20,000 attendees.

== Background information ==
The festival is known for its wide-ranging musical scope, as well as its family friendly atmosphere, with a large dedicated family camp-site, as well as free entry for children under the age of 12. Previous acts that have played at the festival include Madness, Tom Jones, Two Door Cinema Club, Kaiser Chiefs, Ed Sheeran, Ben Howard, James, Manic Street Preachers, Deacon Blue, Texas, Embrace, The Automatic, The Proclaimers, The Wombats, Travis, and others.

Stages include, The Garden Stage (Main Stage set in Italian Gardens), The Hot House (Rock Indie, Alternative, Singer-songwriter), The Grassroots (folk, roots, acoustic), Venus Flytrap (comedy, wrestling, cabaret), The Seedlings (emerging and buzz new acts), Mother's Ruin (Dance and Electronic), The Verb Garden (talks, debates, films), The Burke and Hare (cabaret, performance, dj's), The Bella Bar stage, Free Range Folk Stage (singer-songwriters, traditional, acoustic based bands), Jazz Bar (new for 2016) and an array of busking stages.

Other areas of the festival include a dedicated children's area, with puppet workshops, arts and crafts, circus skills, dance and music classes and much more. The Walled Garden hosts a variety of alternative therapies, the Burke & Hare and Free Rage Folk stages, and re-enactment groups.

Over the years the festival has also hosted Ice-rinks, roller discos, Danny Maccaskills Drop & Roll, and a zip line.

The festival has a tradition of selecting a theme and organisers encourage revellers to don fancy dress on the Saturday. Previous themes have been:

2026 - Party Animals

2025 - Bella Goes To The Moovies

2024 - Love

2023 - Cartoons

2022 - Myths and Legends

2021 - [cancelled due to COVID]

2020 - [cancelled due to COVID]

2019 - Science Fiction

2018 - Bollywood

2017 - Summer of Love

2016 - Superstition

2015 - Superheroes

2014 - Wild Life

2013 - Carnival

2012 - Royalty

2011 - Space

2010 - Wonderland

Tartan heart fringe

== Fringe ==
In previous years as well as the festival itself there was also a Festival fringe which centered around the 2 weeks surrounding the festival. This finished in the early hours of Hootananny's on the Thursday prior to the festival. The fringe's gigs had no entry-fee in some bars/pubs however others may charge, the fringe showcased a variety of Acts and Music Genres. The Fringe set the mood in the run up to Belladrum Tartan Heart Festival on 8 and 9 August 2008, offering a musical trail around the Highlands for the intrepid music lover.

== 2004 ==
The festival began in 2004 with 2,000 people attending for one day in Belladrum's Italian Gardens, the terraced arena that now acts as the Garden Stage. Since then, the capacity has grown 18,500 people over two and a half days (3 - 5 August 2017), with an additional headliner being added to the ceilidh warm up on the Thursday night in 2015.

=== Garden Stage ===
Friday 14 August
- Linda Gail Lewis & The Lewis Three
- The Grim Northern Social
- The Andy Gunn Band & Geno Washington
- James Grant & Friends
- Karen Matheson & Donald Shaw of Capercaillie
- The Lush Rollers
- The Peatbog Faeries
- The David Ogilvy Band
- Totó la Momposina
- Dionyssus
- Mystic Shoes
- Winners of the Hootananny's Battle of the Bands Competition

== 2005 ==
In 2005 the festival was on Friday 12 and Saturday 13 August. This year it had five stages, ranging in size from the Grassroots Tent, which has a capacity of approximately 250 and is dedicated to small acoustic and folk acts, through to the Garden Stage, which is a natural amphitheatre that can hold several thousand people

In 2005, new features include the Seedlings Stage for new or unsigned artists and the Venus Flytrap Palais, a stage totally dedicated to the wonderful and sometimes, frankly, weird in music, theatre, cabaret and performance art.

=== Garden Stage ===
Friday 12 August	Saturday 13 August
Alabama 3; The Bees; Emiliana Torrini; The Duhks; Stetsonhead; El Presidente; Pulse Winners	The Proclaimers; The Peatbog Faeries; British Sea Power; Aberfeldy; Ricky Ross; The Country Joe Band; Karine Polwart; Baka Beyond; Galipaygos

=== Hothouse Stage ===
Friday 12 August	Saturday 13 August
Jah Wobble; The Black Velvets; Editors; Exist; Endrick Brothers; Ruthless Blues; The Sundowns	The Bluetones; Trashcan Sinatras; Mohair; Brakes; The Cinematics; Poor Old Ben; The Jim Hunter Band; Dexter Ardoine & The Creole Ramblers; The Hazey Janes

=== The Black Isle brewery Grassroots Stage ===
Friday 12 August	Saturday 13 August
Andy White; Karl Broadie Band; Alex Ryan; Jason Ringenberg; Wadada; The Hotlicks Cookies; N'Faly Kouyate; Gypsy Dave Smith	Michael Marra; Unholy Trinity - Ronnie Elliott, Terry Clarke & Wes McGhee; Andy Gunn; Foy Vance; Heather MacLeod; Calamateur; Craig Anderson; Ruth Sutherland; Davy Cowan; Feis Rois Ceilidh Band

== 2006 ==
=== Garden Stage ===
Friday 11 August	Saturday 12 August
Echo & the Bunnymen; Mark Saul; Mystery Jets; Lee Scratch Perry; The Cinematics; Camera Obscura; Union Avenue; The Hazey Janes	Embrace; Bellowhead; Bell X1; The Automatic; Dreadzone; Arlo Guthrie; The Vatersay Boys; Batucada Sound Machine; Dangleberries

=== Hothouse Stage ===
Friday 11 August	Saturday 12 August
Red Hot Poker Session: Andrew MacDonald; Biffy Clyro; Guillemots; 3 Daft Monkeys; Forward Russia; The Young Knives; The Rumble Strips; Cord; The Green Machine; Paddy Rasta	The Eco Policeman's Ball(Featuring Dolphin Boy); The Wonder Stuff; King Creosote; Morning Runner; Seth Lakeman; Tiny Dancers; The View; Vincent Vincent and the Villains; Stereoglo; Acoustic Love Experience

=== The Black Isle brewery Grassroots Stage ===
Friday 11 August	Saturday 12 August
Global Cooling Session: The Shortwave Set; Chris Difford; Culture Clash; Unkle Bob; Shipcote; Seasick Steve; David Ogilvy; Scott MacDonald; The Moonshiners; Claire Campbell; Caley Ceilidh Trail Band	Global Cooling Session: Grandadbob; Stephen Fretwell; Breaks Co-Op; The Puppini Sisters; Martin Stephenson & The Toerags; Charlotte Gordon Cumming; Luke Toms; I See Hawks in LA & Tony Gilkyson; Errol Linton; Tom Morton; Hobotalk; Feis Ross

=== Hail Seedlings Stage ===
Friday 11 August	Saturday 12 August
The Rites; Edgar Prais; Our Small Capital; Magdalen Green; Endor; The Galipaygos; Employee of the Month; Shutter; Call to Mind; Copy Haho; Beerjacket	Jyrojets; Drive-by Argument; Invisibles; Pop-up; Marshall Arts; Vivian Scotson; The Side; Hussys; Mouse Eat Mouse; Michael Rattray; The Now

=== Venus Flytrap Palais ===
Friday 11 August	Saturday 12 August
I Can't Handle Me' Chantale MacCormick; Jamboree/Wardrobe of Delights; The Ralfe Band; Hot Potato Syncopators; Joe West; The Laundrettas; Kid Carpet; Attic Lights	Flash Monkey & Rev Rum Tum Ti Bum Bum; iLiKETRAiNS; Illicit; Session A9; Puppetry of the Pops (Nathan Evans); Mama's Brand New Bag; Meg & Peg Go To The Fest (The Reduced IMPs); Mark Dean - the Yodelling Mix Meister; Cape Reality (Jeep Solid & Graeme Roger)

== 2007 ==
=== Garden Stage ===
Friday 10 August	Saturday 11 August
Magic Numbers; Alabama 3; The Peatbog Faeries; Ghosts; Jackie Leven, Robert Fisher, Michael Weston King; The Law; Nuru Kane; Crash My Model Car; Jazz On The Lawn - Four On Six	James; The Ring Of Fire; Misty In Roots; The Hoosiers; Fred Morrison; The Dykeenies; Dangleberries; The Parsonage Choir; Beat That

=== Hothouse Stage ===
Friday 10 August	Saturday 11 August
Julian Cope; Nine Black Alps; 1990s; Martha Wainwright; The Earlies; Phil and Ally; Jyrojets; Skilda; The Lorelei	Pigeon Detectives; Mumm Ra; Scouting for Girls; Bens Brother; Pete & The Pirates; String Driven Thing; Polytechnic; Babel; Paul Steel

=== The Black Isle brewery Grassroots Stage ===
Friday 10 August	Saturday 11 August
Red Hot Poker Session: Skibunny DJ; Sandi Thom; Amy MacDonald; Tom Russell; Angus & Julia Stone; 6 Day Riot; Lisa Haley & The Zydekats; Nick Harper; Ben Taylor; Jaymay; Gypsy Dave Smith with Retro Smith	Red Hot Poker Session: Oom; Lloyd Cole; Duke Special; Wreckless Eric & Amy Rigby; Martha Tilston; Kris Drever; Piney Gir; Loomer; Lach; Roddy Hart; James Lawton; Feis Ross

=== Hail Seedlings Stage ===
Friday 10 August	Saturday 11 August
The Needles; Theatre Fall; Sergeant; The Wallbirds; Lowtide Revelry; Luva Anna; Strike the Colours; Micheal MacLennan; Haight Ashbury; Brendan Campbell; Caley Ceilidh Trail	Action Group; The Vivians; Make Model; Figure 5; Le Reno Amps; Our Luna Activities; Foxface; Baxter; Sorren MacLean; FiveFifteen

=== Venus Flytrap Palais ===
Friday 10 August	Saturday 11 August
Headphone Disco; Flash Monkey; The Strange Death of Liberal England; Murdina Morag - The Musical with the Love Pylons; Blazin' Fiddles; Circulus; Luminescent Orchestrii; All Three Kingdoms by The Tartan Troubadors; Slow Club; The White Cat/ Jaberwocky	Invernetian Masked Ball/ Secret Chamber Orchestra; Club Noir & The Martians in the intermission; Tunng; Murdina Morag - The Musical with the Love Pylons; Kate Nash; Fake Bush; Orchestre del Sol; The Seven Plots by R.I.P.; Ox.Eagle.Lion.Man; The White Cat/ Jaberwocky

== 2008 ==
2008 saw the Tartan Heart Festival win the award for the best Grass Roots Festival (2008)

=== Garden Stage ===
Friday 8 August	Saturday 9 August
Scouting For Girls; Jefferson Starship; One Night Only; Vatersay Boys; Baka Beyond; Big Hand; Union Avenue; Leonard Jones Potential	The Waterboys; Sons and Daughters; Dreadzone; Nouvelle Vague; Salsa Celtica; Attic Lights; Punch and the Apostles; Dangleberries; Low Tide Revelry & Inverness Gaelic Choir

=== Hothouse Stage ===
Friday 8 August	Saturday 9 August
Idlewild; Black Affair; The Twilight Sad; Red Light Company; Old Blind Dogs; Broken Records; The Brute Chorus; Frightened Rabbit; Call to Mind	Cold War Kids; Infadels; Sergeant; Kissmet; Look See Proof; Friends Of The Bride; The Hosts; The Xcerts

=== The Black Isle brewery Grassroots Stage ===
Friday 8 August	Saturday 9 August
Justin Currie; Angus & Julie Stone; Kathryn Williams & Neil McColl; Rachel Unthank and the Winterset; Southern Tenant Folk Union; Pete Molinari; Brendan Campbell; Rosabella Gregory; The Lost Brothers; Calery Ceilidh Trail	Edwyn Collins; Pete Wylie; Lisa Knapp; Wallbirds; Dennis Hopper Choppers; Agnostic Mountain Gospel Choir; The Mercury Men; Wynntown Marshalls; Jake Cogan; Feis Rois

=== Hail Seedlings Stage ===
Friday 8 August	Saturday 9 August
Abigail Gray; The Kazoo Funk Orchestra; Jocasta Sleeps; Jack Butler; Captain and the Kings; Root System; 28 Jacks; Manor Park Elite; Battle for Bella Winners	Shutter; Twin Atlantic; Edgar Prais; Paper Planes; Alto Elite; Injuns; The Draymin; Dotjr; Ketimine Deco

=== Venus Flytrap Palais ===
Friday 8 August	Saturday 9 August
Baby Beat (for Kids); Rhythm & Rhyme (for Kids); Yusef Azak; Reggae Woodland Roots; Derek Meins; The Blank Album; Orchestra del Sol; The Cyriac Review Cabaret Show (Adult Only)	Baby Beat (for Kids); Bruce Fummey (Adults Only); Animal Behaviour; The Parsonage Choir; Four On Six; Kerieva; Izo Fitzroy & The Royal Bastards; The Cyriac Review Cabaret Show (Adults Only); The Invernetian Masked Ball (Adults Only)

== 2009 ==
The 2009 festival took place on 7 and 8 August, and the headline acts were the Editors and Ocean Colour Scene

=== Garden Stage ===
Friday 7 August	Saturday 8 August
Editors; Peatbog Faeries; Toploader; Transglobal Underground; Broken Records; The Joy Formidable; Kid British; Scooty & the Skyhooks; Grousebeater Soundsystem	Ocean Colour Scene; The Saw Doctors; Noah & the Whale; Treacherous Orchestra; Kissmet; Edward II; The New Forbidden; Dangleberries; Theatre Fall

=== Hothouse Stage ===
Friday 7 August	Saturday 8 August
Shed Seven; Alabama 3; *The Wallbirds: Dananananaykroyd; Orkestra Del Sol; Little Comets; Official Secrets Act; The Unthanks; Shutter; The Holloways replaced The Wallbirds after they cancelled their appearance	British Sea Power; Sons & Daughters; DeVotchKa; Twin Atlantic; The Phantom Band; Magistrates; Hatcham Social; 3 Daft Monkeys; Sparrow & Workshop

=== The Black Isle brewery Grassroots Stage ===
Friday 7 August	Saturday 8 August
Glenn Tilbrook & Fluffers; Tommy Reilly; Lau; Pearl and the Puppets; Tommy Womack; Blue Roses; Babel; Jo Hamilton; Rebecca Hollweg; Caley Ceilidh Trail	Seth Lakeman; Aberfeldy; The Lost Brothers; Rory McLeod; Sam Issac; Phil Lee; Ballachulish Hellhounds; Jonathan Jeremiah; Alex Cornish; Feis Rois

=== Hail Seedlings Stage ===
Friday 7 August	Saturday 8 August
The Side; Sergeant; St Deluxe; Flood Of Red; Bronto Skylift; Healthy Minds Collapse; Cast Of The Capital; Washington Irving; Colour Coded; Battle4Bella Winners	Our Lunar Activities; Punch & The Apostles; Unicorn Kid; Party Horse; Sucioperro; The Naked Strangers; Cruisers; Cassidy; Three Times Daily; Battle4Bella Winners

=== Potting Shed Stage ===
Friday 8 August MIR FRIDAY AT 5 POTTING SHED

=== Mother's Ruin DJ Stage ===
Friday 7 August	Saturday 8 August
Colin Gregory; Robbie Dunsmore; Araya; Alex Tronic; Technocelt; Bourbon Surf; Esko; Frog Goes ERP	Colin Gregory; Robbie Dunsmore; Esko; Dolphin Boy; Plexus; Butterscotch; Joystick Discothèque; Look Mum It's the DJ's

== 2010 ==
- Feeder
- Amy Macdonald
- The Wailers
- Badly Drawn Boy
- The Divine Comedy
- The Levellers
- King Creosote
- Twin Atlantic
- Candy Staton
- Dick Gaughan
- The Vatersay Boys

== 2011 ==
- Texas
- Deacon Blue
- Ed Sheeran
- Ben Howard
- King Charles
- Frank Turner
- Skerryvore
- Teddy Thompson
- Vintage Trouble
- Roddy Hart & The Lonesome Fire
- The David Latto Band (Potting Shed Stage)

== 2012 ==
=== Garden Stage ===
Friday 8 August	Saturday 9 August
The Wombats; We Are Scientists; Kassidy; The South (formerly "The Beautiful South"); Vintage Trouble; Red Kites; James Mackenzie; Hoodja; Bwani Junction	Travis; Frightened Rabbit; Beverley Knight; Treacherous Orchestra; Kobi; Dangleberries; Federation of the Disco Pimp; Bombskare; Teenage Gaelic Singing Group w/Eilidh Mackenzie

=== Hothouse Stage ===
Friday 8 August	Saturday 9 August
The Buzzcocks; Black Affair; Foy Vance; Headphone Disco; Make Sparks; Sweet Billy Pilgrim; Fatherson; The Draymin; Torridon	Bobok; Dog is Dead; Headphone Disco; Iain McLaughlin & The Outsiders; Karima Francis; Little Mill of Happiness; Man Like me; The Blackout; The Milk; Willie Campbell & The Open Day Rotation; Zombie Militia

== 2013 ==
Garden Stage (Main Stage) saw James headline along with Twin Atlantic, Pigeon Detectives, Alabama 3, Seasick Steve and many more.

=== Mothers Ruin Stage (DJ Stage) ===
Friday 2 August	Saturday 3 August
Filth DJs; Ally McCrae; Them & Us; Mike Mcdonald; Bullwhack; Esbjerg; Connor Bryne; Alottaryhthmman	Jakk It & Saizme; Sounds Clash DJs; Count Clockwork; Aaron Russell; Alan Macpherson; Digitized; Shameless; Alan Grant

== 2014 ==
- Tom Jones
- Reef
- Frightened Rabbit
- Billy Bragg
- Glenn Tilbrook
- The Temperance Movement
- Grandmaster Flash
- Adrian Edmondson & The Bad Shepherds
- The Vatersay Boys

== 2015 ==
=== Garden Stage (Main Stage) ===
Friday 7th Augustday Garden Stagei	Saturday 8 August
Manic Street Preachers; Idlewild; Stornoway; Hayseed Dixie; Prides; Torridon; Fun Box; Head North; Vigo Thieves	Kaiser Chiefs; The Stranglers; Martha Reeves; Manran; King Creosote; James Brown is Annie; The Dangleberries; Silver Coast; Dorec-a-Belle; Rhythm Wave

=== Hothouse Stage ===
Friday 7 August	Saturday 8 August
Superheros Disco; The Sunshine Underground; Drenge; JP Cooper; Louis Berry; Adam French; The LaFontaines; Model Aeroplanes; Hidden Charm; JuneBug	The Cuban Brothers; Rival Sons; Fatherson; Kill it Kid; Honey Blood; Neon Waltz; AKAska; Winter Tradition; Vukovi; Hector Bizerk; Iain McLaughlin and the Outsiders; Frozen Disco (kids)

=== Grassroots Stage ===
Friday 7 August	Saturday 8 August
The Dolly Parton Story; Eddi Reader; Martin Stephenson & The Dainties; Dizraeli and The Small Gods; Blackbeards Tea Party; The Skull Kids; The Shee; Have Mercy Las Vegas; The New Madrids; Siiga; The Elephant Sessions; Caledonian Ceilidh Trail; Spinning Tots	MacFloyd; Villagers; John Langan Band; Tantz; CoCo and the Butterfields; RURA; Rusty Shackle; Miss Irenie Rose; Jamie Lawson; The Goat Roper Rodeo Band; Willie and Tabs MacAskil; Feis Rois

== 2016 ==
=== Garden Stage (Main Stage) ===
Thursday 4 August	Friday 5 August	Saturday 6 August
The Darkness; Beardymans Dream Team; Tiggs D'Author; Main Street Blues; Torridon; Stephanie Urbana Jones & The New Madrids; The Retrophones ft Colin Steele; Woodentooth; Rock Challenge	Two Door Cinema Club; Super Furry Animals; Bombskare; Skipinnish; The LaFontaines; Grousebeater Sound System; Fun Box; Elephant Sessions; James Mackenzie	Madness; Wilko Johnson; Donald Shaw and Diane Garisto perform: Graceland; Breabach; CC Smugglers; The Dangleberries; Spring Break; Inverness Military Wives Choir

=== Hothouse Stage ===
Friday 5 August	Saturday 6 August
The Orb; Alabama 3; Dreadzone; Gun; Whyte; Astrid; Man Made; Catholic Action; Sinderins; Nieves; Schnarff Schnarff	Hot Dub Time Machine; Circa Waves; Public Services Broadcasting; Lucy Spraggan; Craig Duncan; The Hunna; Colonel Mustard and the Dijon 5; Man of Moon; Lional; The Lush Rollers; The Side

== 2017 ==
- The Pretenders
- Franz Ferdinand
- Sister Sledge
- K T Tunstall
- First Aid Kit
- Colonel Mustard & The Dijon 5

== 2018 ==
- Paloma Faith
- The Fun Lovin' Criminals
- The Charlatans
- Amy Macdonald
- Professor Green
- Ward Thomas
- Colonel Mustard & The Dijon 5
- Gerry Cinamon
- Primal Scream

== 2019 ==
=== Garden Stage (Main Stage) ===
Thursday 1 August	Friday 2 August	Saturday 3 August
Luna The Professor; Torridon; Dodgy; Tom Odell; Elbow	Highland Voice Choir; Lional; Fun Box; Swampfog; Royal Sounds; Elephant Sessions; Dodie; Johnny Marr; Chvrches	Rionnagan Rois; Tamzene; The Dangleberries; The Local Honeys; Colonel Mustard and The Dijon 5; Skerryvore; The Selecter; Lewis Capaldi; Jess Glynne

=== Hot House Stage ===
Thursday 1 August	Friday 2 August	Saturday 3 August
Stephanie Cheape; The Dazed Digital Age; Fat Suit; Scooty and the Skyhooks; Stone Broken; Hawkwind	King Kobalt; Indigo Velvet; Vistas; Paris Monster; Bis; King Nun; BombSkare; The Rezillos; SOAK; Glasvegas; The Cuban Brothers	Josephine Sillars; Black Cat Bone; Man of Moon; Be Charlotte; PAWS; The Ninth Wave; Maisie Peters; Self Esteem; The Sugarhill Gang (Did not perform); The Coral

== 2022 ==
The Belladrum Tartan Heart Festival returned to Scotland on 28 July 2022 with the festival featuring performances from The Magic Numbers, Tide Lines, Daytime TV, Emeli Sandé, Admiral Fallow, Nile Rodgers & Chic, Dreadzone, The Fratellis, Siobhan Miller, Vistas, Peat & Diesel (replacing Sam Ryder at short notice), Shed Seven, Passenger and a DJ set from Gok Wan. Highlights from the festival were broadcast on BBC Scotland and BBC Alba, with Fiona MacKenzie and Niall Iain MacDonald presenting. Full sets from a number of acts were also available on the BBC iPlayer.
