= Coming Home (Kaiser Chiefs song) =

2014 single by Kaiser Chiefs

Single by Kaiser Chiefs

from the album Education, Education, Education & War
- Released: 13 February 2014
- Recorded: 2013
- Studio: The Maze, Atlanta
- Genre: Indie rock, Britpop
- Length: 4:51
- Label: Fiction, Caroline International, Universal Music
- Songwriters: Nick Baines, Simon Rix, Andrew White, Ricky Wilson
- Producer: Ben H. Allen

Kaiser Chiefs singles chronology
| "Bows & Arrows" (2014) | "Coming Home" (2014) | "Meanwhile Up in Heaven" (2014) |

Music video
- "Coming Home" on YouTube

"Coming Home" is a song by English rock band Kaiser Chiefs. The song was released as the lead single from their fifth studio album, Education, Education, Education & War (2014). It was released in the United Kingdom on 13 February 2014 as a digital download. The song peaked at number 31 on the UK Singles Chart, and is the first Kaiser Chiefs single to reach the UK Top 40 since "Never Miss a Beat" in 2008. It is also the band's first single to feature Vijay Mistry, formerly of fellow Leeds band and opening act Club Smith, who replaced original drummer Nick Hodgson the year prior, on drums.

== Music video ==
A music video to accompany the release of "Coming Home" was first released onto YouTube on 19 February 2014 at a total length of four minutes and forty-two seconds. The video, directed by James Slater, having previously worked with the band on the videos for "Meanwhile Up in Heaven" and "My Life", was shot on the moor above the village of Blubberhouses, in the Yorkshire Dales, England.

== Track listing ==
Digital download
| No. | Title | Writer(s) | Producer | Length |
|---|---|---|---|---|
| 1. | "Coming Home" | Nick Baines, Simon Rix, Andrew White, Ricky Wilson | Ben H. Allen | 4:51 |

== Charts ==
| Chart (2014) | Peak position |
|---|---|
| Belgium (Ultratip Bubbling Under Flanders) | 10 |
| Ireland (IRMA) | 89 |
| Scotland Singles (Official Charts) | 31 |
| UK Singles (Official Charts) | 31 |
