= I Found Out (The Pigeon Detectives song) =

2006 single by the Pigeon Detectives

Single by the Pigeon Detectives

from the album Wait For Me
- Released: 6 November 2006
- Length: 2:10
- Label: Dance to the Radio
- Songwriter(s): Oliver Main, Matt Bowman
- Producer(s): Will Jackson (album version), Stephen Street (2007 single release)

The Pigeon Detectives singles chronology
"You Know I Love You" (2006)	"I Found Out" (2006)	"Romantic Type" (2007)
"Take Her Back" (2007)	""I Found Out" (Re-release)" (2007)	"This Is an Emergency" (2008)

"I Found Out" is the first single from English indie rock band the Pigeon Detectives' debut album, Wait for Me (2007). The track was re-recorded for the 2007 single release with the Smiths and Blur producer Stephen Street. Officially there are three versions of the track. The album version was slightly re-mixed from the original single version along with the Stephen Street version. The 2007 re-release had different artwork from the 2006 release along with brand new B-sides. The first release reached No. 39 on the UK Top 40 chart while the re-release peaked at No. 42.

== Track listings ==
=== 2006 release ===
CD (DTTR018CD)

1. "I Found Out"
2. "Left Alone"
3. "Hello (My Old Friend)"

7-inch version 1 (DTTR018)

1. "I Found Out"
2. "Left Alone"

7-inch version 2 (DTTR018VL)

1. "I Found Out"
2. "Hello (My Old Friend)"

=== 2007 release ===
CD (DTTR040CD)

1. "I Found Out" (new version)
2. "I Need You"
3. "Take Her Back" (Andy Hillier's Hot Jazz Aces)

7-inch (DTTR040)

1. "I Found Out" (new version)
2. "I'm Not the One"

== Charts ==
Chart (2006)	Peak position
Scotland (OCC)	42
UK Singles (OCC)	39
UK Indie (OCC)	1

== Certifications ==
Region	Certification	Certified units/sales
United Kingdom (BPI)	Silver	200,000^{‡}
^{‡} Sales+streaming figures based on certification alone.
