= I'm Not Sorry =

Single by The Pigeon Detectives

from the album Wait For Me
- Released: 21 May 2007
- Recorded: 2006
- Genre: Indie rock
- Length: 3:42
- Label: Dance to the Radio
- Songwriter(s): Oliver Main / Matt Bowman
- Producer(s): Will Jackson

The Pigeon Detectives singles chronology
"Romantic Type" (2007)	"I'm Not Sorry" (2007)	"Take Her Back" (2007)

"I'm Not Sorry" is the third single from The Pigeon Detectives and is featured on their debut album Wait For Me. It reached #12 in the UK Top 40. As of 2009, it is The Pigeon Detectives' highest charting UK hit. This song is featured in the video games Burnout Paradise and UEFA Euro 2008.and also the European version of Jam Sessions

== Track listing ==
CD (DTTR029CD)

1. I'm Not Sorry
2. Dick'ead
3. A Kick in the Shins (demo)

7" version 1 (DTTR029)

1. I'm Not Sorry
2. Wouldn't Believe It (demo)

7" version 2 (DTTR029VL)

1. I'm Not Sorry
2. I'm Always Right (Live at Leeds Met)
