= This Et Al =

Former British alternative rock band

- Origin: Leeds, England
- Genres: Indie rock, alternative rock
- Years active: 2002–2008
- Labels: On The Bone Records; Dance to the Radio; Monotones; FC Recordings
- Members: Wu - Vox & Guitar; Ben Holden - Guitar; Gavin Bailey - Bass; Steve Wilson - Drums
- Past members: Simon Stevens - Bass; Chris Wall - Bass

This Et Al were an English alternative rock band, from Leeds and Bradford, West Yorkshire, England. They were active between 2002 and 2008. Their sound was compared to My Bloody Valentine, ...And You Will Know Us by the Trail of Dead, Queens of the Stone Age, Interpol, and The Stills.

== Former members ==
- Neil 'Wu' Widdop – Vocals & guitar
- Ben Holden – Guitar & keyboard
- Gavin Bailey – Bass
- Steve Wilson – Drums
- Chris Wall – Bass

== Career ==
This Et Al formed in Bradford in November 2002. All of their releases enjoyed airtime on MTV2, as well as BBC Radio 1 and XFM. They toured with Minus The Bear, Scarling., Amusement Parks on Fire and ¡Forward, Russia!, and also appeared at the Download Festival and Leeds Festival. After a run of sold out singles and heavy touring for several years, the band released their debut album, Baby Machine, in a limited pressing in 2006 before a wider release on 9 April 2007. After a couple of member changes and a tour in Germany, the band released Figure Eight EP (19 May 2008), followed by a retrospective collection entitled B-Sides & Rarities. The group disbanded in June 2008 following a run of internal disagreements.

Post-This Et Al, frontman Wu went on to record and release his solo project, Stalking Horse, as well as performing as part of Department M with former Grammatics member Owen Brinley. Guitarist Ben formed Bradford-based band Dolphins in 2009 and currently plays in alternative indie band, Big Love. Drummer Steve Wilson, after a stint in fellow Leeds act, Dinosaur Pile-Up, played for the London based band Japanese Voyeurs till 2012 before later joining Leeds-based metal band Hawk Eyes. Former bassist Gavin Bailey is now the frontman of synthpop act Secret Circuits.

The band, featuring the original lineup, reunited briefly for a one-off show with ¡Forward, Russia! at the Brudenell Social Club in Leeds on 30 November 2013, to celebrate the venue's 100th anniversary.

== Influences and legacy ==
This Et Al cited influences including Interpol, the Smiths, Radiohead, Sonic Youth, Mogwai, Godspeed You! Black Emperor, ...And You Will Know Us by the Trail of Dead and Queens of the Stone Age.

They have been cited as an influence by ¡Forward, Russia! and Sky Larkin.

== Discography ==
=== Studio albums ===
- Baby Machine - (2007)
- B-Sides & Rarities - (2009)

=== EPs ===
- Figure Eight EP - (2008)

=== Singles ===
- "He Shoots Presidents" (9" Split w/ ¡Forward, Russia!) - (2005)
- "You've Driven For Miles (& Not Remembered a Thing)" b/w "All You'll Ever Be is a Dancer" - (2005)
- "Wardens" b/w "Rotary Queen" - (2005)
- "Template" b/w "The Loveliest Alarm" - (2005)
- "Sabbatical" b/w "Solemn As My Rifle" - (2006)
- "Of National Importance" b/w "The Mother Position" - (2007)
