= Yes Boss =

Yes Boss may refer to:

- Yes Boss (film), 1997 Bollywood film
- Yes Boss (TV series), Indian situation comedy
- Yes Boss (band), British rap duo
