= Romantic Type =

Single by The Pigeon Detectives

from the album Wait for Me
- Released: 26 February 2007
- Recorded: 2006
- Genre: Indie rock
- Length: 2:45
- Label: Dance to the Radio
- Songwriter(s): Oliver Main / Matt Bowman
- Producer(s): Will Jackson

The Pigeon Detectives singles chronology
"I Found Out" (2006)	"Romantic Type" (2007)	"I'm Not Sorry" (2007)

"Romantic Type" is the second single from the Pigeon Detectives and is featured on their debut album Wait for Me. It reached number 19 on the UK Singles Chart.

== Music video ==
The music video for "Romantic Type" was directed in the style of a 1970s television series by Paul Morricone.

== Track listings ==
CD (DTTR026CD)

1. Romantic Type
2. You're Just No Good for Me
3. Let Go (demo version)

7" version 1 (DTTR026)

1. Romantic Type
2. You're Just No Good for Me

7" version 2 (DTTR026VL)

1. Romantic Type
2. Mislead
