= Ellur =

British musician (born 2000)

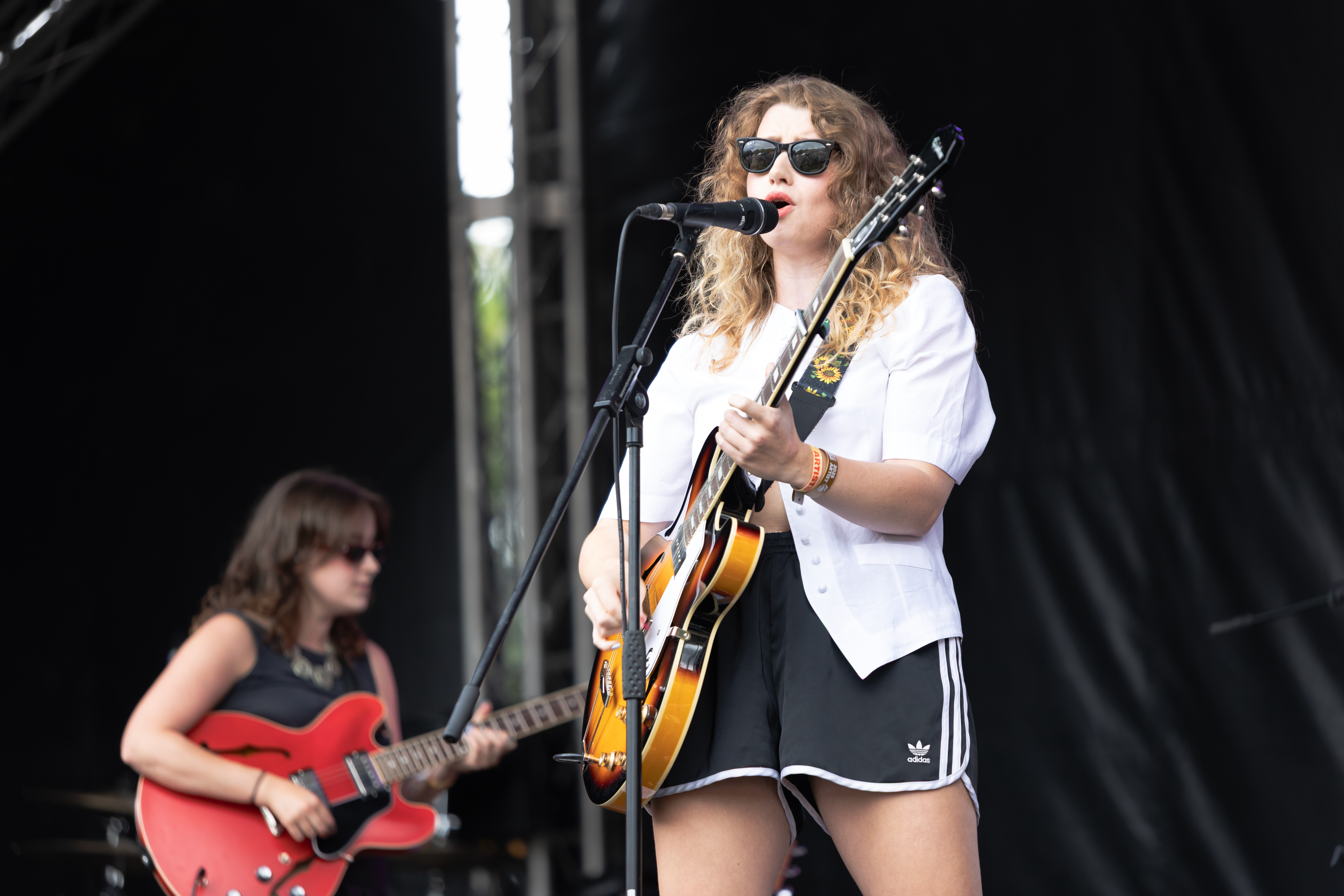
- Ellur performing in 2025

Background information
- Born: Ella Megan McNamara; 25 November 2000 (age 25); Halifax, West Yorkshire, England
- Genres: Indie pop; pop
- Occupation: Singer-songwriter
- Instruments: Vocals; guitar; piano
- Years active: 2020–present
- Label: Dance to the Radio
- Website: ellur.biz

Ella Megan McNamara (born 25 November 2000), known professionally as Ellur, is an English singer-songwriter from Halifax. She (Note: McNamara uses both she/her and they/them pronouns. This article uses she/her for consistency.) is the daughter of Embrace guitarist Richard McNamara. Her debut album At Home In My Mind was released in 2026.

== Life and career ==
Ella Megan McNamara was born on 25 November 2000 and grew up in Halifax, West Yorkshire. Her stage name is a pronunciation spelling of her given name based on the Yorkshire accent. Her father is Richard McNamara, one of the co-founders of the rock band Embrace along with his brother Danny. Her mother worked as an art teacher, and McNamara has described wanting to become both a musician and a teacher while growing up. Her parents are divorced, something which has influenced her music, in particular her 2025 single "The World Is Not An Oyster". She is bisexual.

Before embarking on a full-time career in music, McNamara worked various jobs, including as a barista and a gardener, while playing covers sets in pubs at weekends. McNamara's debut single "Reflection" was uploaded to streaming services in January 2020. In August of the following year, she released her debut EP Moments via the Leeds-based independent record label Dance to the Radio.

As a headline act, McNamara undertook a three-date tour in 2024 and a sold-out six-date tour the following year. She also appeared as a support act for established bands such as Kaiser Chiefs, Blossoms and Supergrass. In August 2024, she and her band played a set on the BBC Music Introducing stage at Leeds Festival. She then played other festivals including Latitude and South by Southwest, the latter of which was her first performance in the United States.

McNamara's debut studio album At Home In My Mind was released on 6 February 2026, and reached number 41 on the UK Albums Chart.

== Artistry ==
McNamara's music has been described as indie, pop, and indie pop. Her music has drawn comparisons to contemporaries such as Holly Humberstone and Nieve Ella by NME, and Sharon Van Etten and Wolf Alice by Dork. She has named a wide range of artists and bands among her influences, including Adele, Coldplay, Radiohead, Embrace, Adrianne Lenker, CMAT, The War on Drugs, Sam Fender, The 1975 and Dora Jar; this diverse array of inspirations led to The Line of Best Fit describing her music as "collagic". She also credited the "space and serenity" of her Yorkshire home and her co-songwriters such as Joel Johnston and Benjamin Francis Leftwich with helping to develop her style.

== Discography ==
=== Studio albums ===
- At Home in My Mind (2026)

=== Extended plays ===
- Moments (2021)
- God Help Me Now (2025)

=== Singles ===
- "Reflection" (2020)
- "Alive" (2020)
- "I Don't Know What We Are" (2020)
- "Monochrome" (2020)
- "Burn It All Down" (2021)
- "Migraine" (2021)
- "Close to You" (2022)
- "Best Face On" (2022)
- "Now I'm Alone" (2022)
- "Anywhere" (2023)
- "Free" (2023)
- "The Woman" (2023)
- "Satellites" (2024)
- "Boys" (2024)
- "Your Dog" (2024)
- "Yellow Light" (2024)
- "Missing Kid" (2025)
- "The Wheel" (2025)
- "Disintegrate" (2025)
- "The World Is Not An Oyster" (2025)
- "Dream of Mine" (2026)
