= ¡Forward, Russia! =

English rock band

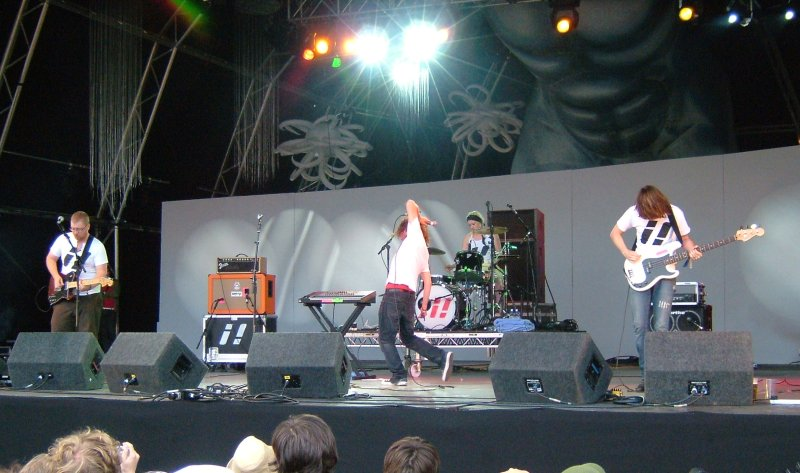
- ¡Forward, Russia! at Summer Sundae 2006

Background information
- Origin: Leeds, England
- Genres: Indie rock, dance-punk, post-hardcore
- Years active: 2004–2008, 2013–2014, 2026–present
- Labels: Cooking Vinyl, Dance to the Radio, Mute North America, Vinyl Junkie
- Members: Tom Woodhead; Rob Canning; Katie Nicholls; Whiskas

¡Forward, Russia! are an English rock band from Leeds, active between 2004 and 2008, before re-forming in 2013. The band's debut album, Give Me a Wall, was released in 2006. Until 2006, the band only named tracks with numbers, in the order that they were written. The band had used faux Cyrillic, with its name occasionally typeset as ¡FФЯWДЯD, RUSSIД!. The band went on hiatus after the release of their second album, Life Processes, in 2008. They re-formed in 2013 for a show at the Brudenell Social Club in Leeds in November 2013 for its 100th anniversary, and then played the Live at Leeds Festival at Leeds Town Hall in 2014.

== History ==
=== Formation and early singles ===
¡Forward, Russia! were formed in early 2004 by Tom Woodhead and Rob Canning, formerly of Leeds band The Black Helicopters, and siblings Katie Nicholls and Whiskas (Sam Nicholls), previously of Leeds band Les Flames!, amongst others. The band performed their first gig in April, closely followed by demos which received reviews from prominent music magazines such as Drowned in Sound and NME, who called it "Convulsing punk-funk brilliance from Leeds".

In April 2005, ¡Forward, Russia! released "Nine", a split 7-inch single with This Et Al, released on guitarist Whiskas' label Dance to the Radio. This single was reviewed by the NME, who put it on their 'Radar'. The single sold out within a week.

By summer 2005, Nicholls had finished college and others had quit their jobs to take up the band full-time.

Single "Thirteen"/"Fourteen" was released in August 2005 on White Heat Records, accompanied by a UK tour. Also during 2005, the band was featured in NME as one of Leeds' forerunners in the so-called 'New Yorkshire' scene (alongside The Research, The Sunshine Underground, The Ivories and Black Wire). This was followed by several support slots and culminated in the band's first headline UK tour, which took the band to 37 different venues.

The band's next release, "Twelve" appeared in January 2006, on Dance to the Radio, entering the UK Top 40 at 36.

=== Give Me a Wall ===
Their next single, a new version of "Nine", was released in May, and preceded the debut album Give Me a Wall, produced by Paul Tipler and released on 15 May 2006 in the UK. Around this time they toured with We Are Scientists, and played alongside The Automatic, The Long Blondes, Howling Bells and Boy Kill Boy on the 2006 NME New Music Tour.

The band signed to Mute Records in North America, where Give Me A Wall was released on 19 September 2006. A digital single of "Thirteen", as well as two EPs with lead tracks "Nine" and "Eighteen", were released to support the album. ¡Forward, Russia! have visited America four times, all in 2006, to play South by Southwest, the CMJ Music Marathon and tours with Scanners and Snowden. In Japan the band signed to Vinyl Junkie Recordings. Dance to the Radio distributed Give Me a Wall for the rest of the world, through an agreement with Cooperative Music. The album was on the most part released in late September/early October, with the band touring most of Europe around the period.

"Eighteen", the fourth track to be lifted from the album in the UK, was released in July on CD and two 7-inch single formats, reaching number one in the UK Indie Chart. The video for "Eighteen" features cameo appearances from members of The Pigeon Detectives, This Et Al and The Playmates.

"Nine" was featured on the soundtrack to the 2007 PS2 game Burnout Dominator. The original version of "Nine" was produced by Richard Green, previously of Ultrasound and The Somatics.

2006 included a short UK tour and numerous UK and European festival appearances, as well as performances in the United States. The band played at the Reading and Leeds and Carling Weekend festivals, appearing on the NME/BBC Radio One Stage. The band played the MTV2 Spanking New Music Tour in November 2006 alongside Wolfmother, The Maccabees and Fields. "Nineteen" was released as the final single from the album to support this tour.

At Belgium's Pukkelpop Festival, the band debuted their first post-GMAW material – "Don't Be A Doctor" – also the first song with a non-numerical title. "Doctor" was recorded by GMAW producer Paul Tipler in September 2006 and released as a white-label one-sided etched ten-inch single on 12 February 2007. The track was released digitally for the first time ever as part of Dance to the Radio's compilation Out of the Woods and Trees. The compilation also features rare tracks from Howling Bells and The Pigeon Detectives.

The band headlined a short UK and Irish tour in February and March 2007 to wrap up domestic promotion for the debut album.

=== Life Processes ===
Following a secret show to preview new material, the band recorded new material with producer Matt Bayles in Seattle, US. On their blog of studio updates, numerous working titles for the songs were mentioned, including three songs previewed on the early 2007 tour. A single taken from the album, "Breaking Standing", was the first material from these sessions to be released. The album was entitled Life Processes and was released by Cooking Vinyl in the UK on 14 April 2008, Mute North America in June 2008, and Vinyl Junkie in Japan on 26 March 2008. The Japanese release includes exclusive bonus tracks "Reflection Symmetry" and "Don't Be A Doctor". The album, which according to Spin writer Josh Modell explored "more expansive, proggier territory" than its predecessor, met with a positive critical reception with Drowned in Sound describing it as "peppered by moments of brilliance" and The Independent stating that the album "skilfully combines punk rock ferocity with melodic ingenuity".

=== Current status ===
In 2008, the band announced that they had "decided to take a break from doing ¡Forward, Russia!", and that the band would not be playing or recording "for the foreseeable future". Their statement said "The idea of doing another tour with nothing new to offer was something that enthused none of us." Katie Nichols had moved to Nottingham to undertake an art course, while Woodhead had worked as a producer. The last known show or performance was held at the Brainwash festival, at the Brudenell Social Club, on 17 October 2008. In February 2009, it was announced that Whiskas was joining Duels as a full-time member. On 30 March 2013, the band re-emerged on Twitter, starting rumours of a reunion or re-formation, which were confirmed on 9 September in the form of a one-off gig at Brudenell Social Club to take place on 30 November 2013, followed by a second gig at Leeds Town Hall as part of Live at Leeds Festival on 3 May 2014.

On 19th May 2026, the band announced that they would be playing 4 shows to celebrate 20 years of GMAW in London, Glasgow and Leeds.

== Musical style ==
The band's music has been described as "art rock", "contemporary agit-punk", and "high-octane dance-punk". When Give Me a Wall was released, the band received comparisons with Bloc Party, while the NME described them as sounding "like a peculiarly English take on emo". The band's second album was described by Pitchfork as "a curious mélange of studied dance-punk and flailing hardcore".

Jon Pareles, reviewing a live performance from 2006 in The New York Times stated "[their] songs aren't content with verse and chorus; they're packed with incident, and they're propelled by the indefatigable drumming of Katie Nicholls. Instruments unite for muscular, danceable funk, then splay apart like a fist suddenly opening."

Woodhead's vocals were described as "post hardcore operatic screeching".

They cited influences including And None of Them Knew They Were Robots, Pylon, Nathaniel Green and the Cribs.

They have been cited as an influence by Youthmovies and Vijay Mistry of the Kaiser Chiefs and Club Smith.

== Band members ==
- Tom Woodhead – vocals, synth
- Rob Canning – bass, guitar
- Katie Nicholls – drums, vocals, shouts
- Whiskas – electric guitar, shouts, synth

=== Work outside the band ===
Nicholls remixed I Was a Cub Scout's "I Hate Nightclubs"; her remix was released as a bonus single available exclusively online. She has also been nominated for the Peta 2's (People for the Ethical Treatment of Animals) 'World's sexiest Vegetarian' in 2007, 2008, and 2009, but did not win.

Whiskas remixed Howling Bells' "Low Happening" under the name '¡Constructicons Form Devastator!' and his remix was released as a bonus single available online and on a 7-inch single.

Woodhead has an electronic side-project AnteAter, with one release to date, "Final Lekky" on DTTR's 3rd compilation Something I Learned Today – released March 2007. He also performed the vocals in the chorus of the Yes Boss song "Tongues in Knots" from their album Look Busy.

== Discography ==
=== Studio albums ===
- Give Me a Wall (15 May 2006), Dance to the Radio – UK No. 53
- Life Processes (14 April 2008), Cooking Vinyl

=== Singles ===
Title	Release date	Label	UK Singles Chart	Album
"Nine"	April 2005	Dance to the Radio		
"Thirteen" / "Fourteen"	August 2005	White Heat	74	
"Twelve"	January 2006	Dance to the Radio	36	Give Me a Wall
"Nine"	May 2006	Dance to the Radio	40	Give Me a Wall
"Eighteen"	July 2006	Dance to the Radio	44	Give Me a Wall
"Nineteen"	November 2006	Dance to the Radio	67	Give Me a Wall
"Don't Be A Doctor"	Feb 2007	Dance to the Radio		
"Breaking Standing"	7 April 2008	Cooking Vinyl	195	Life Processes
