= Give Me a Wall =

Studio album by ¡Forward, Russia!
- Released: 15 May 2006
- Recorded: 2005
- Genre: Indie rock
- Length: 49:15
- Label: Dance to the Radio
- Producer: Paul Tipler

¡Forward, Russia! chronology
Give Me a Wall (2006)	Life Processes (2008)

Professional ratings
Review scores
Source	Rating
Allmusic	3.5/5 stars
NME	8/10 stars
Pitchfork Media	(6.2/10)
Rocklouder	4/5 stars
The Guardian	Not rated
Stylus	B+

Give Me a Wall was the debut album from ¡Forward, Russia!, and was released in the UK on 15 May 2006 and in the US on 19 December 2006. Tracks on the album include previous singles "Twelve", "Nine" and "Thirteen". The album was released through the band's own label, "dance to the radio". When asked why the album was self-produced, guitarist Whiskas proclaimed, "We're sick of waiting around for labels to sort themselves out, so we're doing it ourselves." Following the previous releases tradition, all the tracks are named after the order they were written.

== Track listing ==
All tracks written by ¡Forward, Russia!

1. "Thirteen" – 4:02
2. "Twelve" – 2:14
3. "Fifteen Pt I" – 4:14
4. "Nine" – 3:56
5. "Nineteen" – 4:54
6. "Seventeen" – 4:05
7. "Eighteen" – 3:37
8. "Sixteen" – 5:48
9. "Seven" – 3:28
10. "Fifteen Pt II" – 5:23
11. "Eleven" – 7:28

There is also a short instrumental track in the negative space of "Eleven" and if the CD is rewound at the beginning of "Thirteen" an extended version of the intro plays for 46 seconds, linking the end of "Eleven" to "Thirteen".
