= This Is an Emergency =

"This Is An Emergency"

Single by The Pigeon Detectives

from the album Emergency
- B-side: "Get The Message, Make You Mine"
- Released: (United Kingdom) 12 May 2008
- Recorded: 2008
- Genre: Indie rock
- Length: 3:11
- Label: Dance To The Radio
- Songwriters: Matt Bowman, Oliver Main, Ryan Wilson, Dave Best, Jimmi Naylor.
- Producer: Stephen Street

The Pigeon Detectives singles chronology
"I Found Out" (2007)	"This Is An Emergency" (2008)	"Everybody Wants Me" (2008)

"This Is an Emergency" is the first single from The Pigeon Detectives second album Emergency. It was first played on 24 March 2008 on BBC Radio 1 and was released on 12 May 2008. The B-sides, "Get the Message" and "Make You Mine", were both recorded in the album sessions with Stephen Street.

== Track listing ==
CD

1. This Is an Emergency
2. Get the Message
3. Make You Mine

Gatefold 7"

1. This Is an Emergency
2. Get the Message

Standard 7"

1. This Is an Emergency
2. Make You Mine

== Use in media ==
The track appeared briefly on Eastenders on 18 August 2008. It was also used for the video highlights of the 2008 Chinese Grand Prix on the Official Formula One website. It has been played at Villa Park not long before players come out of the tunnel for Aston Villa games. This track was also used for the BBC series, Junior Doctors: Your Life in Their Hands, as the theme song for the first season.

== Chart performance ==
"This Is an Emergency" is to date The Pigeon Detectives' second biggest UK chart hit. It debuted in the UK Singles Chart at #24 on 11 May 2008, via download sales alone. It rose ten places the following week to its peak at #14, just two places behind their biggest UK hit "I'm Not Sorry" released the year before. It is the band's fourth UK Top 20 single, and as of 2021, it remains their last UK Top 40 hit.

== Chart positions ==
Charts	Peak position
UK Singles Chart	14
UK Indie Chart	1
