= Take Her Back =

Single by The Pigeon Detectives

from the album Wait for Me
- Released: 13 August 2007
- Recorded: 2006
- Genre: Indie rock
- Length: 3:17
- Label: Dance to the Radio
- Songwriter(s): Matt Bowman, Oliver Main, Ryan Wilson, Dave Best, Jimmi Naylor
- Producer(s): Will Jackson

The Pigeon Detectives singles chronology
"I'm Not Sorry" (2007)	"Take Her Back" (2007)	"I Found Out" (2007)

"Take Her Back" is the fifth single released by British indie band The Pigeon Detectives from their début album Wait For Me. It was released on 13 August 2007. It became the band's third straight UK Top 20 single, peaking at No. 20 in the UK Singles Chart.

The song is about age difference in relationships, matching the 22-year-old protagonist alternately with a 17-year-old and a 31-year-old.

== Track listing ==
CD DTTR034CD

1. Take Her Back
2. Wouldn't Believe It (full version)
3. Left Alone (live at Leeds Town Hall)

7" version 1 DTTR034

1. Take Her Back
2. Statik Back

7" version 2 DTTR034VL

1. Take Her Back
2. Take Her Back (live at Leeds Town Hall)

== Charts ==
Chart (2007)	Peak position
UK Singles (OCC)	20
UK Indie (OCC)	1

== Certifications ==
Region	Certification	Certified units/sales
United Kingdom (BPI)	Silver	200,000^{‡}
^{‡} Sales+streaming figures based on certification alone.
