= Black Wire (album) =

Studio album by Black Wire
- Released: 27 June 2005
- Recorded: 2005
- Genre: Indie rock
- Label: 48 Crash

Professional ratings
Review scores
| Source | Rating |
|---|---|
| MusicRemedy | (Very positive) |
| The Red Alert | (Very positive) |

Black Wire is the eponymous debut album by the Leeds band Black Wire. The album was released on 27 June 2005 in the United Kingdom on 48 Crash and 14 February 2006 in the United States on Giant Pecker Records. The U.S. version of the album contains the secret track "Braindead". Access to the song is gained by holding the rewind button of a CD player at the start of the first track until there is silence when the song can then be heard.

== Track listing ==
1. "God of Traffic"
2. "Attack! Attack! Attack!"
3. "Smoke & Mirrors"
4. "Promote the Happy Hours"
5. "Hard to Love Easy to Lay"
6. "800 Million Heart Beats"
7. "Broken Back"
8. "Both Your Houses"
9. "The Face"
10. "Very Gun"
