= Life Processes =

Studio album by ¡Forward, Russia!
- Released: 14 April 2008
- Recorded: 2007
- Genre: Indie rock
- Length: 52:05
- Label: Cooking Vinyl

¡Forward, Russia! chronology
Give Me a Wall (2006)	Life Processes (2008)

Professional ratings
Aggregate scores
Source	Rating
Metacritic	64/100 link
Review scores
Source	Rating
Allmusic	link
Drowned in Sound	link
Pitchfork Media	6.4/10 link
Rocklouder	link
SPIN	link

Life Processes is the second album by ¡Forward, Russia!, and was released in the UK on 14 April 2008. It was produced by former Minus the Bear keyboardist Matt Bayles at Red Room Recordings in Seattle, Washington. The first single from the album is "Breaking Standing". This album marks the end of the numerical song titles which featured on the debut album, Give Me a Wall. "Spanish Triangles" was put up for streaming or downloading before the release of the album.

== Tracklisting ==
All tracks written by ¡Forward, Russia!

1. "Welcome to the Moment (The Rest of Your Life)" – 2:17
2. "We Are Grey Matter" – 4:55
3. "A Prospector Can Dream" – 3:21
4. "Spring Is a Condition" – 5:16
5. "Don't Say Reinvent What You Don't Understand" – 3:40
6. "Some Buildings" – 6:47
7. "Breaking Standing" – 4:16
8. "Gravity & Heat" – 6:03
9. "Fosbury in Discontent" – 3:48
10. "A Shadow Is a Shadow Is a Shadow" – 3:20
11. "Spanish Triangles" – 8:54
