= Emergency (The Pigeon Detectives album) =

Studio album by The Pigeon Detectives
- Released: 26 May 2008
- Recorded: January 2008
- Genre: Indie rock
- Length: 41:27
- Label: Dance to the Radio (UK); Cooperative Music (Europe/Japan/Australia)
- Producer: Stephen Street

The Pigeon Detectives chronology
Wait for Me (2007)	Emergency (2008)	Up, Guards and at 'Em! (2011)

Singles from Emergency
- 1. "This Is An Emergency" Released: 12 May 2008; 2. "Everybody Wants Me"; 3. "Say It Like You Mean It"

Professional ratings
Review scores
Source	Rating
Allmusic	2.5/5 stars
The Guardian	1/5 stars
Mojo	3/5 stars
NME	(6/10)
Q	4/5 stars
Uncut	2/5 stars

Emergency is the second album by Leeds band, The Pigeon Detectives. The album was released on 26 May 2008, just under a year after their platinum debut selling album, Wait for Me. The album was produced by Stephen Street who has produced for bands such as Blur, Babyshambles, The Smiths, Feeder and Kaiser Chiefs.

The first single from the album was "This Is an Emergency" on 12 May 2008, which was first played by Radio 1 on 24 March 2008.

The album was subject to an early leak onto the internet on 1 May, and spread via P2P networks. Unlike many early album leaks, the audio files that were distributed on the internet were of a high quality, and not highly compressed files.

The album peaked at number five in its first week but fell out the charts quickly, spending three weeks in the top 40. Following the release of the second single, "Everybody Wants Me", the album re-entered the top 40 again for another three weeks. Upon its release, it received mixed reviews from critics.

== Track listing ==
1. "This Is an Emergency" (Matt Bowman, Oliver Main) – 3:11
2. "I'm Not Gonna Take This" (Bowman, Main) – 2:44
3. "Keep on Your Dress" (Dave Best, Bowman, Main) – 4:52
4. "Don't You Wanna Find Out" (Main) – 2:44
5. "I'll Be Waiting" (Bowman, Main) – 3:19
6. "She's Gone" (Main) – 2:07
7. "Nothing to Do with You" (Main) – 1:50
8. "I'm a Liar" (Bowman, Main) – 3:16
9. "You Don't Need It" (Main) – 2:47
10. "Say It Like You Mean It" (Main) – 2:43
11. "Love You for a Day (Hate You for a Week)" (Main) – 3:22
12. "Making Up Numbers" (Main) – 3:27
13. "Everybody Wants Me" (Bowman, Main) – 3:42
14. "Draw the Curtain" (Hidden track) – 1:28

== Personnel ==
- Matt Bowman – vocals
- Oliver Main – guitar
- Ryan Wilson – guitar
- Dave Best – bass
- Jimmi Naylor – drums

== Charts ==
Chart	Position
UK Album Chart	5
