= Grammatics (album) =

Studio album by Grammatics
- Released: 24 March 2009
- Genre: Indie rock, alternative rock
- Length: 61:30
- Label: Dance to the Radio
- Producer: James Kenosha

Grammatics chronology
Shadow Committee / Time Capsules and The Greater Truth (Single) (2009)	Grammatics (2009)

Professional ratings
Review scores
Source	Rating
AbsolutePunk.net	(94%) link
God Is in the TV Zine	link
MusicOMH	link
NME	link

Grammatics is the debut full-length studio album by UK indie rock band Grammatics, released in the United Kingdom on 24 March 2009.

The album's last track, "Swan Song," is approximately 6 minutes, and after a few minutes of silence, a 1½ minute hidden track enters.

== Reception ==
The album has a score of 73 on Metacritic

== Track listing ==
1. "Shadow Committee" – 5:10
2. "D.I.L.E.M.M.A." – 4:29
3. "Murderer" – 4:59
4. "The Vague Archive" – 3:55
5. "Broken Wing" – 4:58
6. "Relentless Fours" – 6:38
7. "Inkjet Lakes" – 4:37
8. "Polar Swelling" – 6:39
9. "Rosa Flood" – 3:31
10. "Cruel Tricks of the Light" – 4:02
11. "Swan Song" – 12:31

The track listing according to the 12" version lists an additional track, "Time Capsules & The Greater Truth", having the hidden track play after this.
