= Black Wire =

English post-punk band

- Origin: Leeds, West Yorkshire, England
- Genre: Post-punk
- Years active: 2003–2007; 2013
- Label: 48 Crash
- Past members: Daniel Wilson; Si McCabe; Tom Greatorex; Danny Prescott

Black Wire were an English post-punk band formed in Leeds, West Yorkshire, England

== Members ==
- Daniel Wilson (vocals)
- Si McCabe (guitars, backing vocals)
- Tom Greatorex (bass)
- Danny Prescott (drums)

== History ==
Black Wire formed in January 2003, and played their first gig within a month of forming, at the Leeds club night Pigs. They then went on to tour extensively playing with such bands as Bloc Party, The Libertines, Hard-Fi, The Cribs, Kaiser Chiefs and The Futureheads. Their début single, "Attack! Attack! Attack!", was awarded NME 'single of the week' tag, followed by positive reviews of subsequent releases. The start of 2006 saw a European tour taking in Italy, France and Germany, and also an American tour, which included San Francisco, Chicago, Los Angeles and New York. The band toured Europe once again in June 2007, with the London-based band Art Brut.

The title of Kaiser Chiefs hit song "I Predict A Riot" was based on a show by Black Wire in 2004, when the band once again played the Leeds nightclub, Pigs. Their intense performance caused a stage invasion, at which point security guards began ejecting members of both the audience and band, causing Kaiser Chiefs' drummer Nick Hodgson to exclaim "I predict a riot".

Dan Wilson, having attended Art school, designed and drew the artwork for the first three singles.

Their eponymous début album was released in early 2005 on 48 Crash, a record label which they left in 2006, due to inconsistencies in the label's input and work ethic. They were working on new material set for release in 2007, but then disbanded in August of that year.

McCabe and Prescott performed under the name Lord Auch, while Wilson and Greatorex formed Televised Crimewave both disbanded in 2010.

In 2013, they reformed and played December gigs including the 13th at Birthdays (Dalston, London, UK).

In 2020, they released previously unreleased songs recorded in 2006 as their second album Confetti through Bandcamp.

== Reunion ==
Black Wire reformed for a one-off gig supporting The Cribs in December 2013 at Leeds O2 Academy.

== Discography ==
=== Albums ===
- Black Wire (2005)
- Confetti (2020)

=== Singles ===
- "Attack! Attack! Attack!", 2004
- "The Face" (Limited Edition), 2004
- "Hard To Love, Easy To Lay", 2004
- "Smoke And Mirrors", 2005
- "Hung Up", 2006
- "See The Blood", (limited edition AA sided Vinyl) 2007
