= Wait for Me (The Pigeon Detectives album) =

Studio album by The Pigeon Detectives
- Released: 28 May 2007
- Recorded: Autumn 2006
- Genre: Indie rock; post-punk revival
- Label: Dance to the Radio (UK); V2 (Europe/Japan)
- Producer: Will Jackson

The Pigeon Detectives chronology
Wait for Me (2007)	Emergency (2008)

Professional ratings
Review scores
Source	Rating
AllMusic	3/5 stars
The Guardian	4/5 stars
Rockfeedback	4/5 stars
NME	(7/10)
The Times	2/5 stars

Wait for Me is the debut album of Leeds band The Pigeon Detectives. The album was released for CD, 12" and digital download on 28 May 2007 and charted in the UK Albums Chart at number three in its first week of release. The album sold around 227,000 copies in 2007, reaching No. 70 in the end of year chart. It was certified platinum in June 2008. Upon the album's release, it received generally positive reviews from most critics.

== History ==
The album was recorded at Soundworks Studios in Leeds in the second half of 2006. In between recording the album the band toured vigorously, touring with The Holloways and Kaiser Chiefs. The first release from the album sessions was "I Found Out" which came out in November 2006 and became the band their first top 40 hit.

Following on from the success of "I Found Out", the song "Romantic Type" was chosen as the next single. On 2 January 2007 the song was given its first airing on BBC Radio One 2 hours after the final master was finished. "Romantic Type" hit number No. 19 in the charts on 4 March 2007.

Later that month the band finished mixing the final album with Stephen Harris and Cenzo Townsend.

After a second top 20 hit with "I'm Not Sorry" hitting number No. 12, "Wait For Me" was released on 28 May 2007. "I'm not Sorry" featured on the soundtrack of video game Burnout Paradise.

The band released two more singles from the album: "Take Her Back" reached number 20 in August 2007 and a re-recorded version of "I Found Out", released on 12 November.

== Bonus track ==
For the Japanese version of the album a re-worked version of the track "Let Go" was included. This track became available in the UK in November 2007 through iTunes.

== Track listing ==
All songs by Oliver Main and Matt Bowman

No.	Title	Length
1.	"Romantic Type"	2:37
2.	"I Found Out"	2:07
3.	"Don't Know How to Say Goodbye"	1:56
4.	"Caught in Your Trap"	3:03
5.	"I Can't Control Myself"	2:46
6.	"I'm Not Sorry"	3:42
7.	"You Know I Love You"	3:03
8.	"Stop or Go"	3:12
9.	"You Better Not Look My Way"	4:26
10.	"Take Her Back"	3:17
11.	"Wait for Me"	2:12
12.	"I'm Always Right"	3:01

== Personnel ==
- Matt Bowman – vocals
- Oliver Main – guitar
- Ryan Wilson – guitar
- Dave Best – bass
- Jimmi Naylor – drums

== Charts ==
=== Weekly charts ===
Chart (2007)	Peak position
Dutch Albums (Album Top 100)	54
Scottish Albums (OCC)	2
UK Albums (OCC)	3

=== Year-end charts ===
Chart (2007)	Position
UK Albums (OCC)	70
Chart (2008)	Position
UK Albums (OCC)	159
