= Grammatics =

British alternative rock band

- Origin: Leeds, England
- Genres: Alternative rock, indie rock
- Years active: 2006–2010
- Label: Dance To The Radio
- Members: Owen Brinley; Rory O'Hara; Lindsay Wilson; James Field
- Past members: Rebecca Dumican; Michael Watts; Dominic Ord; Emilia Ergin
- Website: http://www.grammatics.co.uk/

Grammatics were a British alternative rock band from Leeds, England, predominantly influenced by British bands of the 1990s such as Blur, Pulp, and Suede. The band also quotes the following musical influences: Cursive, My Bloody Valentine, Nirvana, Radiohead, Elliott Smith, Queens of the Stone Age, David Bowie, Arcade Fire, Idlewild, Björk, and Kate Bush.

Formed in 2006, the band was composed of Owen Brinley (vocals/guitar), Lindsay Wilson (cello), James Field (drums) and Rory O'Hara (bass). Affiliated with the independent label Dance to the Radio, the band released a few singles prior to making its full-length debut album, released 24 March 2009.

== History ==
The band was formed in early 2006 by Owen Brinley and Dominic Ord. Owen Brinley was the former singer of the now-defunct band Colour of Fire, under the name of Owen Richards. Owen and Dominic ran a popular monthly club night in York, called Grammar. This is where the name of the band comes from. However, the band made their live debut at Fibbers in York on 1 October 2006, under the name "Rose Parade" (named after the song from Elliott Smith’s Either/Or album).

It was during the Grammar nights that Owen and Dom met bass player Rory O'Hara. Later on, Rebeca Dumican joined the band as cellist. A five-track promo EP was made, and the band was one of the 10 bands selected to play the Unsigned Stage at The Carling Weekend, the 2007 Leeds Festival. Whiskas, from the band Forward Russia and founder of the Dance To The Radio label, was one of the competition judges. Grammatics caught the label's attention and were soon signed to UK independent label Dance To The Radio.

Grammatics' first commercial release was a four-track, Japan-only EP entitled Verity and Reverie. This was followed by a limited-edition 7" vinyl single featuring an early version of the track "Shadow Committee", released through Dance to the Radio in October 2007. The band performed twice on consecutive days at that year’s Leeds Festival. Singles D.I.L.E.M.M.A/Polar Swelling (a limited-edition double A-side 10" vinyl single), New Franchise (offered as a free download) and The Vague Archive were released as the band undertook several headlining tours of small UK venues.

Following a string of sold-out limited-edition vinyl releases, Grammatics’ self-titled debut album was released in March 2009. The album was recorded during June–November 2008 in Bridlington, East Yorkshire with young producer James Kenosha (also drummer with Duels).

Line up changes have now been completed, and the band were thought to be recording their second album. It has since been announced that the group were to split, playing final dates in August 2010.

They supported the band Bloc Party on their British tour in October 2009.

The band announced in July 2010 that after a final tour and EP, they would disband due to financial reasons, as well as members living in different cities.

Brinley now performs as Department M (often written as Dept.M) and has released two albums, a self-titled debut on Fierce Panda and follow up 'Deep Control' on Hide & Seek records.

== Musical style ==
Grammatics’ music was based around Brinley’s complex but melodic songwriting style. Their sound veered between driving cello-led dissonant bombast and a more introverted, plaintive side.

They cited influences including David Bowie, Suede, Blur, Arcade Fire, My Bloody Valentine, Radiohead, Low, Cursive, the Icarus Line, Queens of the Stone Age, Nirvana, Elliott Smith, Bjork, Douglas Coupland, Irvine Welsh, Craig Clevenger and Guy Debord.

== Discography ==
=== Albums ===
- Grammatics - CD / Limited Double Gatefold 180 gram 12" Vinyl / Digital Download (2009)
