= The Parsonage (choir) =

- Also known as: Parsonage Choir
- Origin: Glasgow, Scotland
- Genres: Country, folk, blues, choral
- Years active: 2006 to present
- Label: OSScarr Records
- Members: Anne Anderson, Jenny Bell, Claire Bothwell, Sheelagh Boyce, Eamonn Brady, David Caldwell, Jim Callaghan, Julie Callaghan, Paul English, Christine Gibson, Laura Gillespie, Esther Gillies, Martin Graham, Wendy Grannon, Linsay Gray, Martin Gray, Gill Hanlon, Lesley Hepburn, Ulric Kennedy, Chris King, Jenny Lunan, Kirsteen Macdonald, Amanda McKeown, Laura McMahon, Mandy Malcolmson, Dougie Morland, Douglas Morton, Janis F. Murray, Morag Neilson, Caz Norman, Patrick Oberg, Jenny O'Boyle, Emma Olver, Scot Peacock, Kath Pick, Jim Ramsay, Vanessa Rigg, Jenni Robinson, Tania Romany, Caroline Scott, Fiona Shepherd, Gillian Shepherd, Carline Stot, Tim Street, Donna Swabey, Jon Thomson, Victoria Young, Alex Wilde, Caroline Wilson, Lorraine Wilson
- Website: n/a

The Parsonage is a group of around 40 Glasgow based singers which was formed at the beginning of 2006 by Janis F. Murray.

== About the choir ==
The choir is named in honour of the country singer, Gram Parsons. The band describes themselves on their myspace page: "We are a non-religious, mixed sex, varied of age, determinedly independent and self defining organic group. Inspiration comes from the raw, storytelling simplicity of the folk, country and blues traditions." The choir practices at the Glasgow University Research Club.

Many of the band's famous songs are covers of well known popular music. The sound of a choir singing these popular tunes is quite distinctive. The sound is somewhat similar to that of The Langley Schools Music Project.

== Associated musicians ==
The choir claims strong influences by Gram Parsons and Hank Williams and plan their next album to be a tribute to these two. The Parsonage has done backing vocals for Rod Stewart at Hampden. They were involved with Echo & the Bunnymen's album The Fountain, released in 2009. Many of the choir members are well known local musicians from bands such as Foxface, Mother and the Addicts and Bricolage. The choir have played many Scottish festivals, and took part in the 2009 T in the Park festival in Balado, Scotland.

== Discography ==
- This Ain't No Lovey Dovey, EP was released December 2007 on Glasgow label OSScarr Records
