= Yes Boss (band) =

- Origin: Leeds, United Kingdom
- Genres: Indie rap
- Years active: 2006–2007
- Labels: Dance to the Radio
- Past members: Noah; Gavron

Yes Boss were a British indie-rap duo from Leeds comprising vocalist/rapper Noah (formerly of Baby Food) and beatmaker/producer Gavron (Gavin Lawson).

== History ==
Signed to ¡Forward, Russia!'s Dance to the Radio, they had a top 30 hit on the UK Independent Chart with "Tongues in Knots", which featured guest vocals from ¡Forward, Russia! frontman Tom Woodhead.

The band's only album, Look Busy, was originally due to be released in October 2006 but was put back until in 2007, and preceded by a 24-date UK tour. The album was poorly received by the NME, who gave it a 3/10 rating, but Dutch website Kwadratuur viewed it more positively as did Gigwise writer Matt Tucker, who commented on the "immensely entertaining and witty lyrics".

== Discography ==
=== Albums ===
- Look Busy (2007), Dance to the Radio

=== Singles ===
- "Tongues in Knots" (2006), Dance to the Radio
- Tongues in Knots (remixes) EP (2006), Dance to the Radio
- "More or Less" (2006), Dance to the Radio
- "Get Dropped Quick" (2006), Dance to the Radio
- "See It Through" (2007), Dance to the Radio

=== Compilation appearances ===
- What We all Want (2006): "Meet the Boss"
- The World's Heaviest Dubstep Grime and Bass (2007): "Meet the Boss"
