= We Met at Sea =

Studio album by The Pigeon Detectives
- Released: 29 April 2013
- Genre: Rock
- Length: 31:24
- Label: Cooking Vinyl

The Pigeon Detectives chronology
| Up, Guards and at 'Em! (2011) | We Met at Sea (2013) | Broken Glances (2017) |

Professional ratings
Aggregate scores
| Source | Rating |
|---|---|
| Metacritic | 29/100 |
Review scores
| Source | Rating |
| DIY | 3/10 |
| MusicOMH | 3/5 stars |
| NME | 3/10 |

We Met at Sea is the fourth studio album by English band The Pigeon Detectives. It was released in April 2013.

== Track listing ==
All tracks are written by The Pigeon Detectives

We Met at Sea track listing
| No. | Title | Length |
|---|---|---|
| 1. | "Animal" | 2:39 |
| 2. | "I Won't Come Back" | 3:30 |
| 3. | "Hold Your Gaze" | 2:59 |
| 4. | "Light Me Up" | 3:04 |
| 5. | "Can't You Find Me" | 3:49 |
| 6. | "I Don't Mind" | 3:18 |
| 7. | "Day and Month" | 4:03 |
| 8. | "Unforgettable" | 3:25 |
| 9. | "No State to Drive" | 2:04 |
| 10. | "Where You Are" | 2:33 |

iTunes bonus tracks
| No. | Title | Length |
|---|---|---|
| 11. | "Fighting in the Streets" | 3:19 |
| 12. | "If You Want Me" | 3:37 |

Japan bonus tracks
| No. | Title | Length |
|---|---|---|
| 11. | "You Can Do Better" | 2:59 |
| 12. | "Going Through the Motions" | 3:46 |

== Charts ==
Chart performance for We Met at Sea
| Chart (2013) | Peak position |
|---|---|
| Scottish Albums (OCC) | 56 |
| UK Albums (OCC) | 41 |
| UK Independent Albums (OCC) | 7 |
