= Up, Guards and at 'Em! =

Studio album by The Pigeon Detectives
- Released: 4 April 2011 (UK)
- Recorded: April–November 2010
- Genre: Indie rock
- Length: 36:52
- Label: Dance to the Radio
- Producer: Justin Gerrish

The Pigeon Detectives chronology
Emergency (2008)	Up, Guards and at 'Em! (2011)	We Met at Sea (2013)

Professional ratings
Aggregate scores
Source	Rating
AnyDecentMusic?	4.8/10
Metacritic	51/100
Review scores
Source	Rating
AllMusic	2/5 stars
DIY	3/5 stars
Drowned in Sound	4/10
Gigwise	5/10
MusicOMH	2.5/5 stars
NME	3/5 stars

Up, Guards and at 'Em! is the third studio album by Leeds-based Indie rock band The Pigeon Detectives. It was released on 4 April 2011 by Dance to the Radio, and follows the band's 2009 album Emergency

The band released two tracks off the album, "She Wants Me" and "Done in Secret", in the build-up to the album launch, with "Done in Secret" being the first single from the album.

== Recording ==
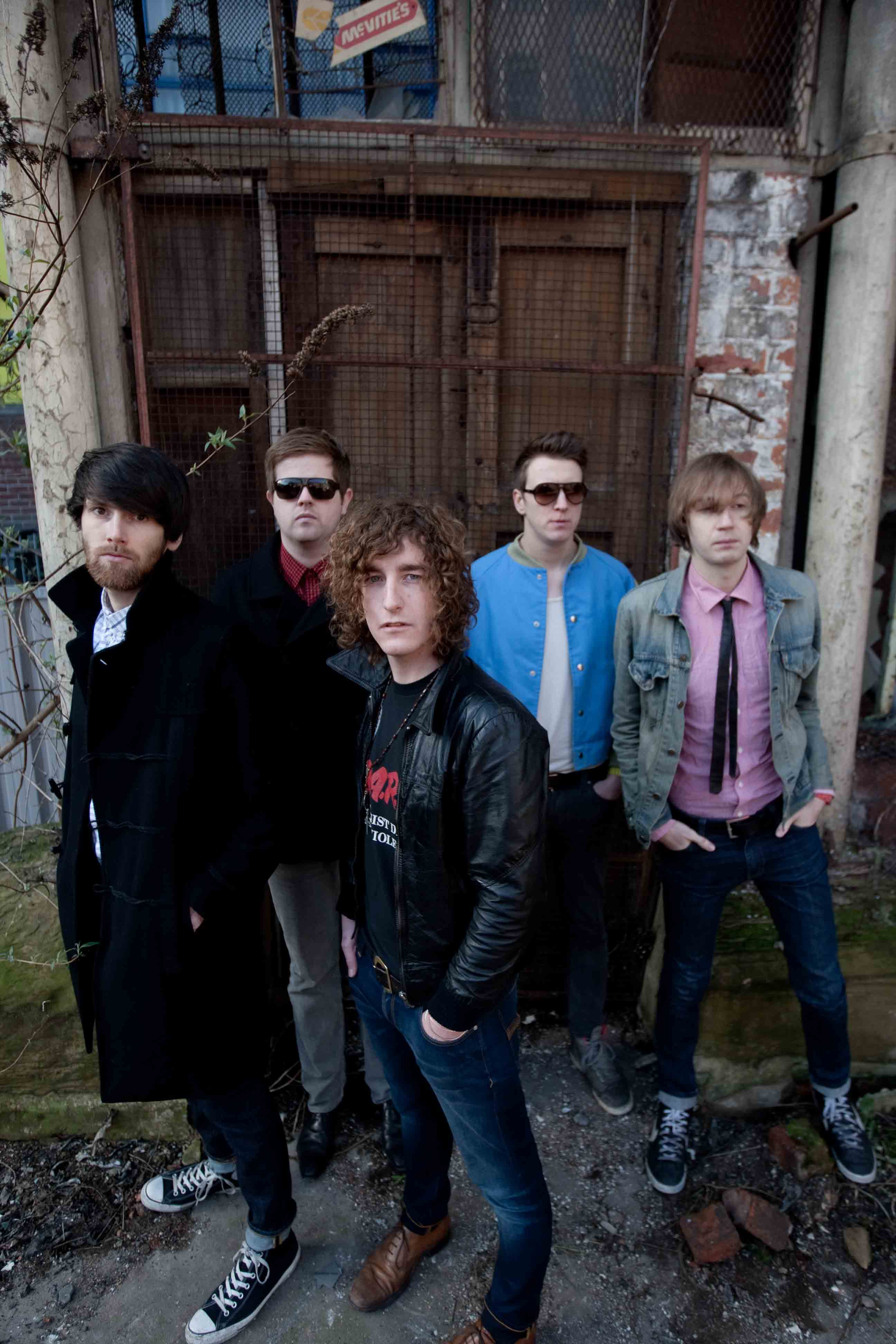
The Pigeon Detectives in February 2011

After the release of their second album in as many years, The Pigeon Detectives took a break from touring and recording. In the summer of 2010 however they set about recording their third album. Working with producer Justin Gerrish and recorded in New York City, the album has been described by frontman Matt Bowman as coming from a "mature" slant.

== Tour ==
Along with the release of the album, the band announced a UK tour covering 14 venues. They were also announced on the Main Stage for Reading and Leeds Festivals in August.

== Critical reception ==
Up, Guards and at 'Em! was met with "mixed or averages" reviews from critics. At Metacritic, which assigns a weighted average rating out of 100 to reviews from mainstream publications, this release received an average score of 51 based on 8 reviews. Aggregate website AnyDecentMusic? gave the release a 4.8 out of 10 based on a critical consensus of 14 reviews.

In a review for AllMusic, Jon O'Brien said: "Described as a rallying call to guitar bands by Bowman, Up, Guards and at 'Em isn't distinctive or original enough to inspire anyone to swap their synths for a six-string, and instead, sounds more like a final nail in the British indie coffin than the shot in the arm it needed." At NME Tim Chester explained: "Those three seconds of stuttering electronica simply take their reputation for leftfield experimentalism too far. Thankfully, such wilful pretension buggers off, and the rest is a more quality-controlled set than last time of big-chorus." Ben Weisz of MusicOMH wrote: "The latest effort is a progression, in that it's not straightforwardly another collection of variations on Take Her Back, but it's nothing spectacular either. There are one or two new ventures into the unknown, but by and large, The Pigeon Detectives haven’t made enough progression from Emergency."

== Chart performance ==
Up, Guards and at 'Em! charted at number 30 on the UK Albums Chart.

== Track listing ==
All tracks are written by Oliver Main and Matt Bowman.

Up, Guards and at 'Em! track listing
No.	Title	Length
1.	"She Wants Me"	3:33
2.	"Lost"	4:13
3.	"What Can I Say?"	4:29
4.	"Need to Know This"	2:42
5.	"Done in Secret"	3:58
6.	"What You Gonna Do?"	3:10
7.	"Turn Out the Lights"	3:48
8.	"Through the Door"	3:15
9.	"Go at It Completely"	3:32
10.	"I Don't Know You"	4:12

== Personnel ==
Musicians

- Matt Bowman – vocals
- Oliver Main – guitar
- Ryan Wilson – guitar
- Dave Best – bass
- Jimmi Naylor – drums

Production

- Justin Gerrish – mixing, producer
- Josh Bonati − mastering
- John Davis − mastering
- Neil Comber – engineer

== Charts ==
Chart performance for Up, Guards and at 'Em!
Chart (2011)	Peak position
Scottish Albums (Official Charts)	43
UK Albums (Official Charts)	30
UK Independent Albums (Official Charts)	8
