= The Wallbirds =

English folk/pop/rock band

The Wallbirds were an English folk/pop/rock band from Doncaster, South Yorkshire, England, formed in 2007.

== History ==
The Wallbirds formed in early 2007 consisting of three cousins Anthony 'Walt' Lindley on vocals, guitar and harmonica, Chris Autey on vocals, drums and Luke Moreton on vocals and bass. The band name came about when Lindley was watching a nature programme when a wallbird popped up, a bird which eats bees, which he thought that would be a great name for a band. The played their first gig in January 2007, just six hours after forming the band, and played a total of four songs at a venue in Doncaster called The Priory. Three months later the band found that they had major interest from several record labels and went under the wing of then-manager Karen Wosskow (Tiny Dancers and Slow Club) In the early days the band played some small tours of the United Kingdom supporting, Australian band Howling Bells and The Tiny Dancers and The Wombats. The band also played shows with Kate Nash, Spoon, Elvis Perkins and Reverend and the Makers.

In late 2007 the band toured the UK with The Pigeon Detectives and in 2008 they toured with Air Traffic and One Night Only.

In December 2007, The Wallbirds released "The Avenue" which reached number 12 in the UK Independent Chart. It was also available as a limited edition vinyl.

At the end of October 2008, the Wallbirds set off to London with no record label backing. They travelled the country using various studios, including RAK Studios (Mickie Most's studio) and they tracked the drums and bass at The Way Studios in Hackney. The studio was chosen because of the impressive vintage 8000 series NEVE desk. The band also travelled to Livingston Studios, Chapel Studios in Lincolnshire and Park Lane in Glasgow. The vocals were recorded at Dean St. Studios, London, and editing was completed at Moloko Studios.

While making the album, The Wallbirds forged a partnership with session musicians Luke 'The Duke' Smith on keyboards, Mike Brown on electric guitar and Harry Morgon on percussion. The outcome was their debut album, Changes with the Moon. The Wallbirds went to Los Angeles to work with Bob Clearmountain who mixed Changes with the Moon. He also mixed their single "Lying at the Side of You", which gained UK airplay through BBC Radio 2 DJs Janice Long, Chris Evans, Terry Wogan and Alex Lester.

The band split up in 2012 to pursue other projects. Anthony Lindley and Chris Autey formed Famous Villains in 2011, although Chris Autey left Famous Villains in 2014. Luke Moreton formed The Pilots in 2012.
