= Club Smith =

English band (2003–2016)

- Club Smith in 2009

Background information
- Also known as: The Hair (2003–2009, 2016)
- Origin: York/Leeds, Yorkshire, UK
- Genres: Indie rock, electronic
- Years active: 2003–2016
- Labels: Louder Than Bombs, Cool For Cats, Four Plus Five, Kurofune, Front Wall, All Sorted !?!, ASR, Tri-Tone
- Past members: Lee Clark; Neil Clark; Sam Robson; Rich Craig; Vijay Mistry; James Kenosha
- Website: www.clubsmith.co.uk (as of 22 October 2014)

Club Smith were an English electro-indie band based in York and Leeds, England, formed in September 2003 as The Hair. The band originally consisted of Sam Robson (vocals/guitar), Neil Clark (keyboard/backing vocals), Lee Clark (bass guitar/backing vocals) and Rich Craig (percussion), with Craig being replaced by Vijay Mistry in 2008 and later James Kenosha in 2013. The Hair rebranded to Club Smith in 2009 and were known for their energetic live performances and toured venues and festivals across the UK and Europe. The band were one of the acts featured on the BBC’s ‘introducing’ stage at the Reading and Leeds Festivals in 2010. Club Smith disbanded in 2016 after a one-off reunion gig with Mistry (reverting to the "Hair" moniker).

== History ==
As Club Smith’s presence grew they supported leading acts such as the Sunshine Underground, Mystery Jets, The Pigeon Detectives and Two Door Cinema Club (all of whom The Hair previously toured with) and played venues all over the UK and as far away as Berlin in addition to playing the 2010 Reading and Leeds Festivals. In 2010, they released their first two EPs, The Loss and The Process. In 2011, the band released their first single under the Club Smith moniker, "No Friend of Mine" and "Young Defeatists" as a double A-side through Front Wall Records.

This was followed by a second single released in November 2011, "Call to Harm" through All Sorted Records. Both singles were picked up in national press such as the Independent and Music Week, with Radio DJs Steve Lamacq (6music), John Kennedy (XFM) and Tom Robinson (6music) playing the singles and XFM placing "Call to Harm" on the Evening playlist during that month.

In late 2011, Club Smith went into the studio with record producers Will Jackson and James Kenosha to record their second overall album (and first as Club Smith).

During early 2012, Club Smith were selected by Kaiser Chiefs as tour support for seven shows where the band enjoyed a warm reception, selling over 900 tour CDs from the merchandise stand. This led to a distribution deal with Tri-tone and PIASUK distribution which was signed as a partnership with All Sorted !?! Records. The band and label formed and imprint "ASR" to release the debut Club Smith album. During the tour with Kaiser Chiefs, Club Smith picked up positive reviews from press such as The Fly, Record of the Day, Artrocker and the music blog Music Broke My Bones.

On 17 August 2012, Club Smith announced they would release their breakout album Appetite for Chivalry through ASR / Tri-tone (Distributed UK-wide by PIAS Entertainment Group) on 12 November 2012. A limited edition format of the album was released on the band's website on the same day.

In January 2013, it was announced that Vijay Mistry would join Kaiser Chiefs as their new drummer, replacing the recently-departed Nick Hodgson. The band confirmed this on their website, with further detail of how the move would affect the future of the band in an interview with Counterfeit Magazine.

In July 2013, Club Smith announced they had signed to Sentric Music in a co-publishing deal with Strictly Confidential, the Brussels-based publishing arm of PIAS Group.

In 2016, the band announced on their Facebook page that they would play one last gig at The Sunshine Underground's last show as "The Hair" with a one-off reunion with Mistry, and disbanded following the gig.

== Major performances ==
- Bfest in 2009
- Supported The Sunshine Underground on Leeds leg of their UK tour in 2010
- Supported Mystery Jets on York leg of their UK tour in 2010
- Leeds and Reading Festivals in 2010
- Supported Two Door Cinema Club on York leg of their UK tour in 2010
- Supported The Pigeon Detectives on nine dates of their 2011 UK Tour
- Supported Kaiser Chiefs on seven dates of their 2012 UK Tour
- Supported Shed Seven for the Manchester leg of their 2011 tour and two festival warm up gigs in London and Sheffield in 2012.

== Band members ==
- Sam Robson – lead vocals, rhythm guitar, drums (2003–2016)
- Neil Clark – keyboards, sampler, drums, backing vocals (2003–2016)
- Lee Clark – bass, lead guitar, backing vocals, drums (2003–2016)
- Rich Craig – percussion, sampler, synthesizer, drums (2003–2008)
- Vijay Mistry – drums (2008–2013, 2016)
- James Kenosha – drums (2013–2016), co-producer (2011–2012)

== Discography ==
=== EPs ===
- The Loss EP (March 2010)
- The Process EP (June 2010)

=== On compilations ===
- Dance to the Radio 5th Anniversary special ("Lament", track 3) (Dance to the Radio) (April 2010)

=== Singles ===
- "Disco Retro" (as The Hair, 2007) (Louder Than Bombs Records)
- "Ghosts" (as The Hair, 2007) (Cool For Cats Records)
- "Blood" (as The Hair, 2008) (Four Plus Five)
- "No Friend of Mine" / "Young Defeatists" (Double A side - June 2011) (Front Wall Records)
- "Call to Harm" (November 2011) (All Sorted !?! Records)
- "Lament" (November 2012) (ASR / Tri-Tone / PIASUK)
- "Beautiful & Useless" (Dave Bascombe / Lance Thomas Mix) (April 2013) (Tri-Tone)
- "The Green Room" (Dave Bascombe / Lance Thomas Mix) (September 2013) (Tri-Tone)

=== Albums ===
- Indecisions (as The Hair, 5 December 2007, Japan-only) (Kurofune Records)
- Appetite for Chivalry (12 November 2012, UK) (ASR / Tri-Tone / PIAS)
