= Vijay Mistry =

English musician (born 1979)

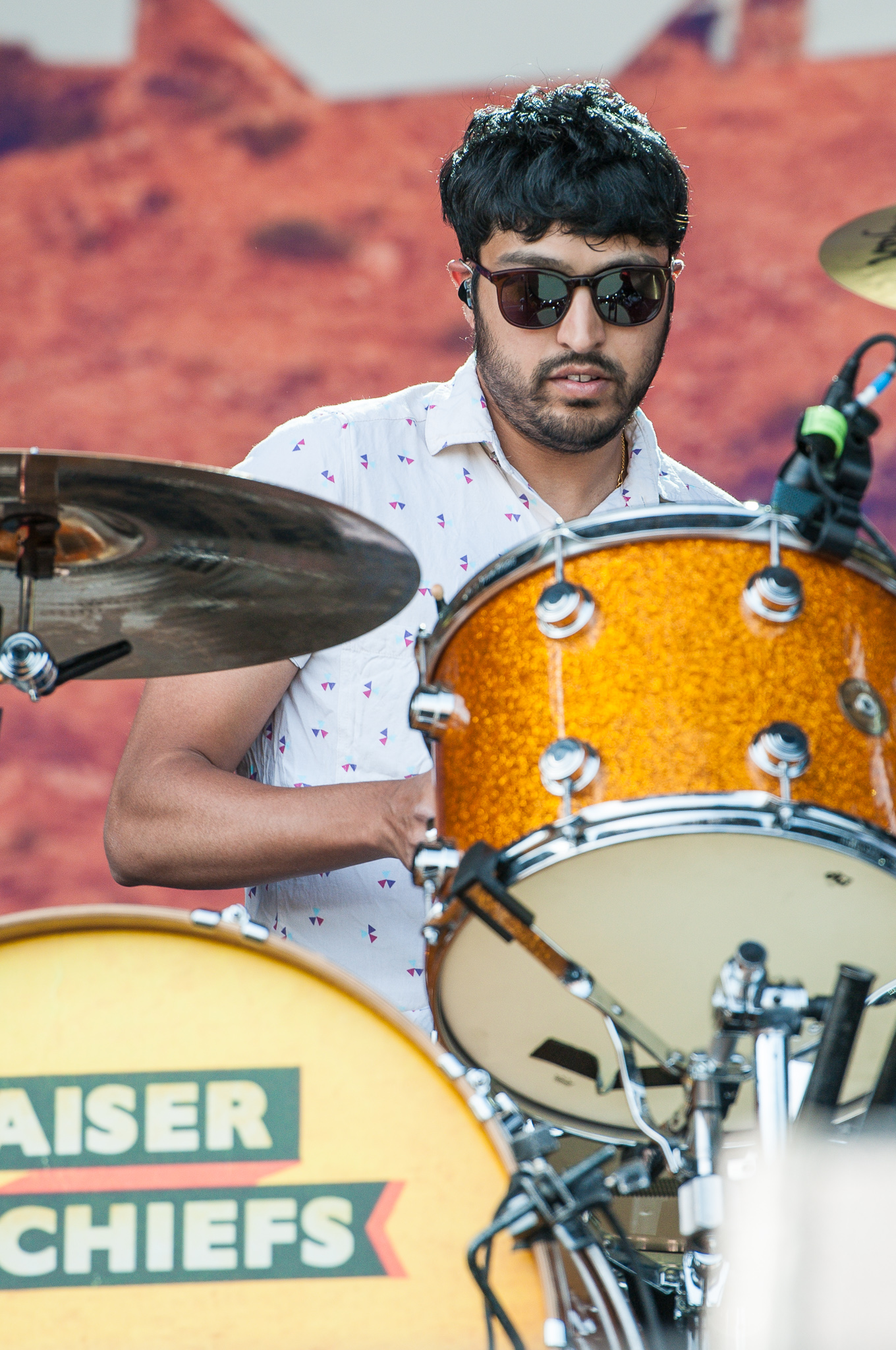
- Mistry performing with the Kaiser Chiefs at Rock im Park 2014

Background information
- Born: August 1979 (age 47); Leeds, England
- Genres: Indie rock, alternative rock
- Occupations: Drummer, songwriter
- Instruments: Drum
- Years active: 2007–present
- Labels: Dance to the Radio, Front Wall, All Sorted !?!, ASR, Tri-Tone, B-Unique, Universal, ATO, Polydor, V2
- Member of: Kaiser Chiefs
- Formerly of: Club Smith
- Website: kaiserchiefs.com

Vijay Mistry (born August 1979), is an English drummer and songwriter. He has been the drummer of the English indie rock band Kaiser Chiefs since 2013 and previously was the drummer of fellow Leeds band Club Smith.

== Biography ==
Mistry was born in Leeds in August 1979 to Indian parents from the Gujarat region. He has revealed in a BBC Asian Network interview that his parents were hesitant of him joining the music industry. Mistry got his first pair of sticks at the age of 12 and got his kit 2 years later. In 2007, Mistry co-wrote the Voltage Union song "All Who You Know" on the Dance to the Radio compilation album Something I Learned Today. In 2008, he joined York/Leeds band The Hair (replacing original percussionist Rich Craig) as their new drummer, rebranding to Club Smith the following year, remaining with the band until his 2013 promotion to the Kaiser Chiefs. He later participated in a one-off reunion with the band in 2016 at their final gig where they reverted to the "Hair" moniker.

In 2013, Mistry joined the more successful Leeds band Kaiser Chiefs (of whom Club Smith toured with the year prior, in turn having also toured with them as The Hair in 2008) replacing original drummer Nick Hodgson. He made his debut on 7 February in Rotterdam, Netherlands. Mistry was replaced at Club Smith by James Kenosha (having previously co-produced the band's lone studio album, Appetite for Chivalry, the year prior). His first Kaiser Chiefs album is Education, Education, Education & War, which was released in 2014. He has stated that one of his favourite live shows was when Kaiser Chiefs headlined the John Peel Stage at Glastonbury.

== Discography ==
=== With Club Smith ===
- Appetite for Chivalry (2012)

=== With the Kaiser Chiefs ===
- Education, Education, Education & War (2014)
- Stay Together (2016)
- Duck (2019)
- Kaiser Chiefs' Easy Eighth Album (2024)
