= Wes McGhee =

- Born: 26 October 1948; Lutterworth, Leicestershire, England
- Died: 30 January 2026 (aged 77)
- Genre: Country
- Instrument: Guitar
- Years active: 1960s–2026
- Labels: Terrapin, The Road Goes On Forever, SteadyBoy

Wes McGhee (26 October 1948 – 30 January 2026) was a British country music musician and producer. Beginning his career as a member of a series of bands in the 1960s, he recorded as a solo artist from the 1970s onwards, releasing nine studio albums.

== Early Life ==
Wes McGhee was born in Lutterworth, Leicestershire, the son of Victor McGhee, a civil engineer and church organist, and Raymonde, a draughtswoman. At school he mixed with American children from families based at the nearby RAF Bruntingthorpe, exposing him to American music from an early age. He began playing guitar at the age of 9.

== Career ==
McGhee formed his first band at the age of 13. After leaving school he played in a number of bands, including The Desperados and Grizelda, relocating to London to pursue further opportunities. With Grizelda, he privided backing for Homesick James's 1970 session for John Peel's BBC Radio 1 show. McGhee also performed for a while in Germany, playing US air bases and Hamburg clubs. In 1971 he teamed up with electronics engineer Keith Lutman to record a self-financed album, subsequently securing a solo record deal in the UK with a subsidiary of Pye Records, although the label's lack of enthusiasm for his fusion of country and psychedelic rock meant that nothing was released. He did, however, record a solo Peel session in 1986.

McGhee's first album, Long Nights and Banjo Music, recorded in London with Avid Anderson, was released in 1978 on his own Terrapin Records label. later that year, he travelled to California and then Austin, Texas for a two-week holiday, but ended up staying for eight months, collaborating with local musicians. He followed Long Nights with Airmail (1980), and Landing Lights (1983). In December 1984, the Austin Chronicle honoured McGhee with a Songwriter's Recognition Night, a recording of the performance from the event being released as the album ...Thanks For The Chicken!. Zacatecas followed in 1986.

McGhee wrote the score for the 1979 Children's Film Foundation production Big Wheels and Sailor, as well as the soundtrack to the Channel 4 documentary Voices in Exile in 1998. He also performed on stage at the National Theatre, in Nicholas Hytner's 2001 production of The Winter's Tale. McGhee was also a member of Freddie Steady's Wild Country, releasing three albums with the band between 1987 and 2026, and performed in the bands of Alvin Crow and Kimmie Rhodes..

Neon and Dust, a compilation of tracks from McGhee's earlier albums, was released in 1990.

In 1994, McGhee released his first solo album for 8 years, Border Guitars. This was followed three years later with Backbeat. Further solo albums followed in the 21st century.

For much of his career, McGhee split his time between London and Texas.

In 2006, he released a joint album, Night Ride To Birmingham, with singer-songwriter Terry Clarke.

His production credits include recordings for Roxy Gordon, Freddie Krc, Ponty Bone, and Joe Giltrap.

McGhee was a keen cricketer, playing as a bowler for the London-based Chadwick club.

== Musical style ==
McGhee's music was described as "unmistakably Texan, a mixture of R and B, Western swing, more than a touch of Mexican, some Rock and roll and a predominant base of country." It was also described as "progressive country", with comparisons made to Jerry Jeff Walker, Waylon Jennings and Jeff Clark.

== Death ==
McGhee died from chronic obstructive pulmonary disease in January 2026, aged 77. He was survived by his wife, Carolyn, daughter, Renee, and sister, Yvonne.

== Discography ==
=== Solo ===
==== Albums ====
===== Studio =====
- Long Nights And Banjo Music (1978), Terrapin
- Airmail (1980), Terrapin
- Landing Lights (1983), TRP
- Zacatecas (1986), TRP
- Border Guitars (1994), The Road Goes On Forever
- Backbeat (1997), The Road Goes On Forever
- Mexico (2002), Terrapin
- Blue Blue Night (2005), Terrapin
- Comala (2017), Terrapin

===== Live =====
- ...Thanks For The Chicken! (1985), Terrapin

===== Compilations =====
- Neon & Dust (1990), Minidoka
- Heartache Avenue (1996), The Road Goes On Forever
- Bead Mountain, Bad Roads & Borders, SteadyBoy/Terrapin

==== Singles ====
- "Whisky Is My Driver" (1981), Terrapin
- "Mezcal Road" (1984), TRP
- "I'll Be thinking Of You" (1984), TRP

=== With Terry Clarke ===
- Night Ride To Birmingham (2004)

=== With Freddie Steady's Wild Country ===
==== Albums ====
- Lucky 7 (1987), Amazing
- Ten Dollar Gun (2008), SteadyBoy
- Pass That Jug! (2026), SteadyBoy

==== Singles ====
- "(I Hear) Neon Angels Sing" (1988), Amazing
