= Far Caspian =

Irish band

Far Caspian is a band headed by Irish musician and producer Joel Johnston.

The band have been influenced by 1980s groups including Orchestral Manoeuvres in the Dark and the Smiths.

== Discography ==
=== Albums ===
- Autofiction (2025)
- The Last Remaining Light (Tiny Library, 2023)
- Ways to Get Out (2021)

EP’s

The Heights (2019)

Between Days (2018)
