= The Pigeon Detectives =

English indie rock band

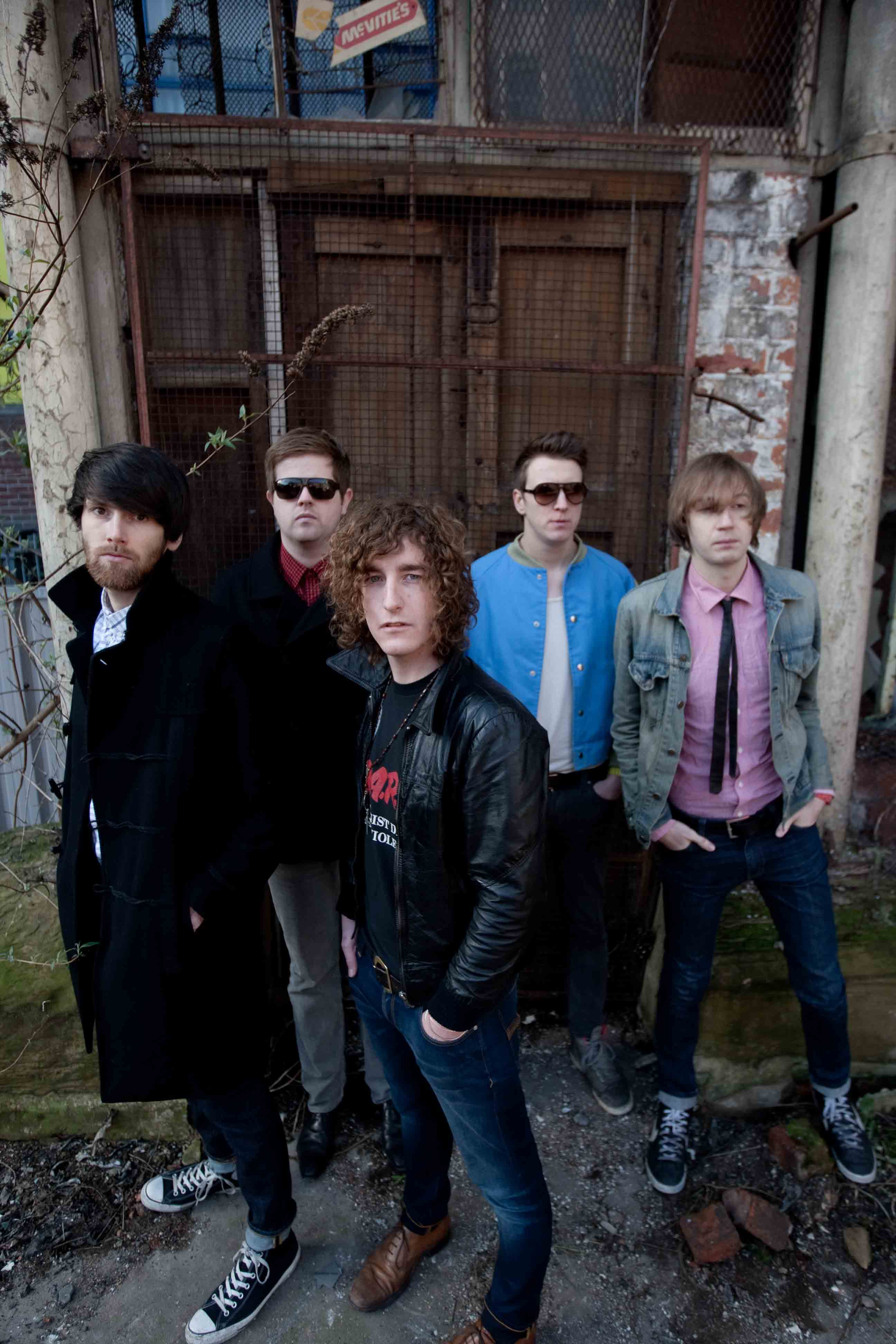
- The Pigeon Detectives in 2011

Background information
- Origin: Rothwell, West Yorkshire, England
- Genre: Indie rock
- Years active: 2002–present
- Labels: Cooking Vinyl, Dance to the Radio
- Members: Matt Bowman (vocals); Oliver Main (guitar); Ryan Wilson (guitar); Dave Best (bass guitar); Jimmi Naylor (drums)
- Website: www.thepigeondetectives.com

The Pigeon Detectives are an English indie rock band from Rothwell in Leeds, West Yorkshire, who formed in 2002. The band has released six albums from 2007 to present.

They performed at the Reading and Leeds Festivals in 2006, where they were tagged "the band most likely to leap to the main stage in 2007" in an NME review. The band returned to the festival in 2007 and performed on the main stage in 2011.

== History ==
=== Band name ===
Speaking about the band's name, the drummer Jimmi Naylor said: "I never liked the name at first. But it's stuck– and it's probably got us more attention having a silly name. The band were just discussing band names and... came up with 'The Pigeon Detectives'. It became an in-joke but we thought nothing of it. But when it came to our first gig in Leeds the promoter was saying, 'What's your name?' We were like 'Oh, um... "The Pigeon Detectives".'"

When asked by BBC Sound about the name, Naylor said, "Dave breeds pigeons, and there's a pigeon that lives in a shed, that's his special pigeon, and this pigeon actually writes all the songs". Another story about the band's name was proposed when Matt Bowman and Ryan Wilson were interviewed for Later with Jools Holland; Bowman said that he and Wilson have a tradition of having Christmas dinner together and when they pulled a cracker they found the name inside. When asked about the rumour Bowman denied it and said, "There's also a rumour that there's a giant pigeon at the bottom of our garden that writes all the lyrics, but that's equally as untrue."

According to Bowman's Twitter, the band is in fact named after a 1970s French cartoon.

== Albums ==
=== Wait for Me ===
The Pigeon Detectives are signed to the independent label Dance To The Radio with whom their first album, Wait for Me, was released on CD, 12" heavyweight vinyl and digital download on 28 May 2007. The album, recorded in autumn 2006, was produced by Will Jackson and was recorded in the band's home town of Leeds.

An early version of the album was leaked to underground music download sites on the internet on 11 April 2007. The album entered the UK Top 40 chart at number 3, achieving Gold status soon after release.

The album track "I'm Not Sorry" featured in the blockbuster video game Burnout Paradise.

On 14 August 2007, the band appeared on the Jo Whiley show and performed their then-current single "Take Her Back" and a cover of Avril Lavigne's "Girlfriend" in the Live Lounge.

In July 2007, the band played at Oxegen, an Irish festival in County Kildare, and again in July 2008. In August 2007, the band played Club NME supported by The Scare and The Stolen, followed by a September performance at Jersey Live, a weekend event held in Jersey, one of the Channel Islands, which included The Fratellis and Kasabian.

In September 2007 it was announced that the Pigeon Detectives had been nominated for Best New Act at the Q Awards, but they lost out to The Enemy.

The band supported Kaiser Chiefs on three of their November/December 2007 UK tour dates, including 1 December at the Manchester Evening News Arena and 15 December at Earls Court in London.

A cover of the Huey Lewis and the News track "The Power of Love" by the band appears on the Radio 1: Established 1967 compilation album.

The band finished promoting Wait For Me and began promoting their second album, Emergency, in May 2008 with two consecutive gigs at Millennium Square in Leeds, playing to 15,000 fans over the two nights.

=== Emergency ===
In January 2008, the Pigeon Detectives recorded their second album, titled Emergency, with producer Stephen Street in Monnow Valley Studios in Monmouth, Wales. The album was released on 26 May 2008, entering the UK album charts at number 5. The lead single, "This Is an Emergency", peaked at number 14, their second-highest-charting single. Shortly before the album's release, the Pigeon Detectives played their biggest ever shows at Leeds Millennium Square playing to over 15,000 people in two sold-out shows.

In June 2008 the Pigeon Detectives had their show at the Brighton Dome filmed and later broadcast on Channelbee.

After a busy summer of festival gigs, including appearances at Glastonbury, T in the Park and the V Festival, the band released the second single from Emergency, "Everybody Wants Me".

The band finished the Emergency promotion by playing a sold-out UK and Ireland tour and a special show at Alexandra Palace in London to 8,000 fans.

=== Up, Guards and at 'Em! ===
After finishing the Emergency tour at the end of 2008, the band took a break. They had been demoing songs over the course of the year in between festival slots, the last of which was headlining the Underage Festival in London. They were also working on a new album.

In October 2009, the band recorded and released a cover of "Tainted Love" (made famous by fellow Leeds band Soft Cell), with all proceeds going to charity to help neglected children in Leeds.

The Pigeon Detectives toured as special guests with the Manchester band James in December 2010.

The band's third album, Up, Guards and at 'Em!, was recorded in Brooklyn, New York, with producer Justin Gerrish in the summer of 2010 and was released on 4 April 2011, with the lead single being "Done in Secret". The album peaked at number 30 in the UK charts, making it the band's third consecutive top 40 album. The band followed the album with two successful UK and Ireland tours, a European tour and a main stage appearance at the 2011 Reading and Leeds festivals sharing the stage with The Strokes and Pulp.

The band toured Europe and Scandinavia in February 2012 to promote the album, as well as playing at Bingley Music Live on 1 September 2012.

=== We Met at Sea ===
The Pigeon Detectives released their fourth album, We Met at Sea, on 29 April 2013. The band went more back to basics, deciding to record the album in their home town of Leeds. They recorded the album with local producers Matthew Peel and Andrew Hawkins at Cottage Road Studios. Throughout 2013 the band toured the UK, northern Europe and Russia promoting the album, and played a series of festivals including Belladrum Festival, Kubana Festival (Russia), Brownstock Festival and V Festival '13.

On 3 May 2014 the Pigeon Detectives performed at Leeds United's annual end of season awards. Leeds United owner Massimo Cellino joined the band on lead guitar for a cover version of Jimi Hendrix's song "Hey Joe".

=== Broken Glances ===
On 24 February 2017, the band released their fifth studio album, Broken Glances. The album was recorded at Chapel Studios in Lincolnshire and produced by Richard Formby. Lead single 'Enemy Lines' was released along with a music video which had over 50k views within a day. The band was invited onto Soccer AM to play the new single live. They then embarked on an extensive UK tour in March of the same year followed by a European tour to promote the new record. The band played in their hometown for 2017's Live at Leeds Festival before appearing as special guests opening the 'Leeds Festival' in August.

=== TV Show ===
The band released their sixth studio album, TV Show, on 7 July 2023.

== Discography ==
- Wait for Me (2007)
- Emergency (2008)
- Up, Guards and at 'Em! (2011)
- We Met at Sea (2013)
- Broken Glances (2017)
- TV Show (2023)
