= Dance to the Radio =

British record label

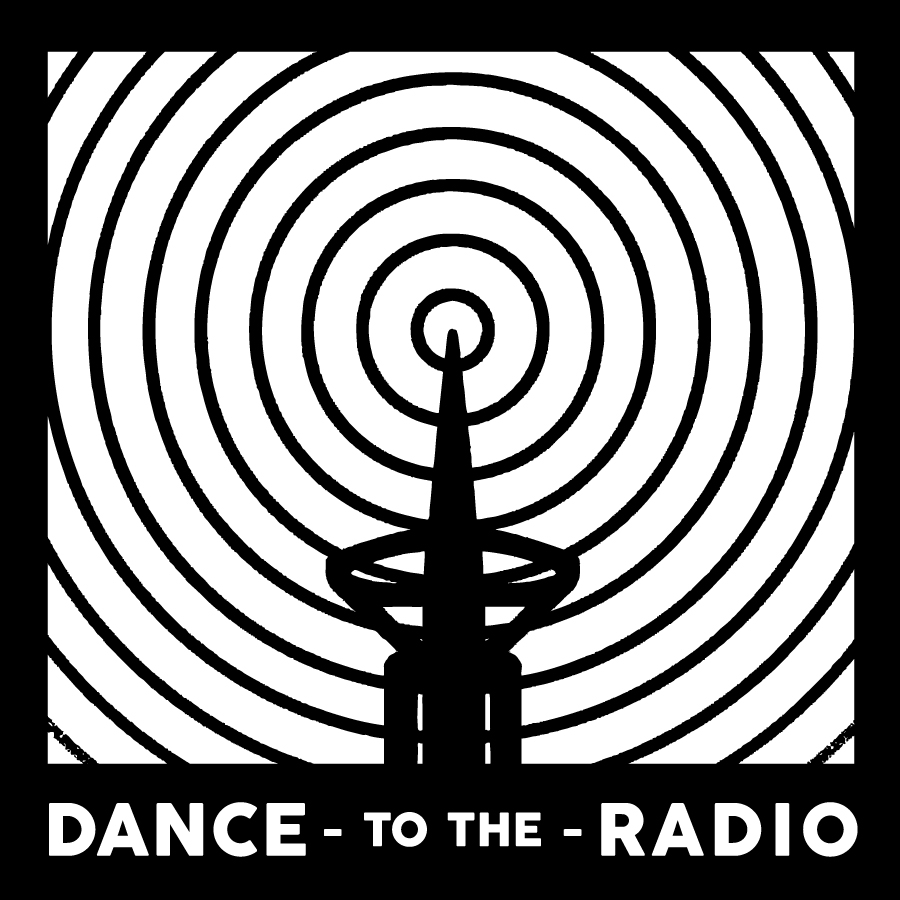
- Parent company: Futuresound Group
- Founded: 2005
- Genre: Indie rock Alternative rock
- Country of origin: United Kingdom
- Location: Leeds
- Official website: www.dancetotheradio.com

Dance to the Radio is a British independent record label, based in Leeds, England.

== History ==
It was named after the refrain of the Joy Division song "Transmission". The label launched with the release of a compilation album 'Dance to the Radio: Leeds' at an eponymous launch event in Leeds in March 2005.

The label subsequently released some 7" singles by the likes of iLiKETRAiNS, The Pigeon Detectives, Yes Boss, Napoleon IIIrd, This Et Al and ¡Forward, Russia!. They have been featured a number of times in NME, Drowned in Sound and in Artrocker for being a notable success of the DIY ethic in the indie music scene at the moment.

Their first full scale single release was Twelve by ¡Forward, Russia! which reached number 36 in the UK Singles Chart. Their second release, again by ¡Forward, Russia!, was a re-release of limited edition debut single "Nine" which also became a top 40 hit. Since these, three more ¡Forward, Russia! singles have been released; "Eighteen", "Nineteen" and "Don't Be A Doctor" the latter of which was a limited White Label Release. The label went on to achieve great success with The Pigeon Detectives. Other early releases include singles from Yes Boss, Sky Larkin, Shut Your Eyes And You'll Burst Into Flames, Bobby Cook and Grammatics.

The label have released EPs for bands like iLiKETRAiNS and Napoleon IIIrd, a number of compilations, and numerous albums.

In 2009 the label launched a new series of compilation 12" records entitled 4x12". Amongst the bands appearing on this series of records included Pulled Apart by Horses, Das Racist, Paul Thomas Saunders, Holy State, Bear Hands & Suckers. The 3rd in the series received critical acclaim from NME, Drowned in Sound and Artrocker. This was followed by releases in 2010 for Elinor Rose Dougall and Leeds post-punk-noise band Holy State.

2011 saw the release of The Pigeon Detectives third album 'Up Guards and At 'Em!'. The fourth Pigeon Detectives record 'We Met at Sea' was licensed by Dance to the Radio to Cooking Vinyl in 2013, and became the band's last charting album to date in the UK Albums Chart, peaking at number 41.

After 2013, Dance to the Radio carried on running a stage at Leeds Festival, but no new records were released until the label was relaunched in 2016 in association with The Orchard and Sony Label Services. Dance to the Radio also set up a publishing entity in partnership with Sentric Music Publishing and was also the artist management arm of The Futuresound Group in Leeds, until being rebranded as fam. (Futuresound Artist Management).

In 2017, the label released new music from The Pigeon Detectives, and signed new UK acts FLING, Dead Naked Hippies, Far Caspian, Tallsaint, Leo Cosmos, Low Hummer and Jake Whiskin.

In 2020, Futuresound (the artist management and festivals company, known for the Last Time Out and Get Together Festivals in Yorkshire) relaunched sister label Slam Dunk Records, originally the label You Me at Six were signed to and a record company which shares its name with their indie rock and alternative festival Slam Dunk.

As of 2022, Dance to the Radio has 20 year old indie-pop girl Ellur signed to their label alongside Sfven and Scottish singer-songwriter Tommy Ashby.

== Dance to the Radio Stage at Leeds Festival ==
Since 2007 Dance to the Radio have hosted a stage at Leeds Festival. Held on the BBC Introducing Stage band who have played the stage include Wild Beasts, Blood Red Shoes, Dinosaur Pile-Up, The Pigeon Detectives, Bear In Heaven, Chickenhawk (now Hawk Eyes), Spectrals, Young Knives, Dog Is Dead, Dutch Uncles, Hookworms, ¡Forward, Russia!, Sky Larkin and more. The stage is hosted on the Thursday evening and is the only stage with live music on this day.

2007 Line Up

¡Forward, Russia!, Shut Your Eyes and You'll Burst Into Flames, Sky Larkin, The Wallbirds, Grammatics

2008 Line Up

Grammatics, Broken Records, The Pigeon Detectives (Secret Set), The Wallbirds, Dinosaur Pile-Up, Wintermute

2009 Line Up

Blood Red Shoes, Wild Beasts, Bear Hands, Airship, Holy State

2010 Line Up

Get Cape, Wear Cape, Fly, Bear In Heaven, Chickenhawk, Spectrals, The Neat

2011 Line Up

Young Knives, Dog Is Dead, We Are Losers, Runaround Kids, Blacklisters

2012 Line Up

Little Comets, Various Cruelties, Scars On 45, China Rats, Likely Lads

2013 Line Up

Dutch Uncles, Hookworms, The Crookes, Black Moth, Menace Beach

2014 Line Up

TOY, Superfood, Honeyblood, Fryars, Post War Glamour Girls

2015 Line Up

Pulled Apart By Horses, The Bohicas, VITAMIN, Carnabells, Redfaces

2016 Line Up

Blood Red Shoes, The Wytches, Freak, Blackwaters, Forever Cult

2017 Line Up

The Pigeon Detectives, High Tyde, FLING, Marsicans, Dead Naked Hippies

2018 Line Up

The Blinders, Anteros, Boy Azooga, Tallsaint, Far Caspian

2019 Line Up

Easy Life, Whenyoung, Indoor Pets, BILK, DJ Jacky P

== Discography ==
Catalogue No.	Release type	Release date	Artist	Title
DTTR001	Split Single	28-Mar-05	Forward Russia / This Et Al	Nine / He Shoots Presidents
DTTR002	Compilation	03-Nov-05	Various	Dancetotheradio: Leeds
DTTR003	Single	23-May-05	The Lodger	Many thanks for your honest opinion
DTTR004	Single	27-Jun-05	Napoleon IIIrd	Napoleon IIIrd
DTTR005	Single	04-Jul-05	I Like Trains	Before the Curtains Close
DTTR006	Single	12-Jan-06	Forward Russia	Twelve
DTTR007	Compilation	27-Feb-06	Various	What we all want
DTTR008	Single	20-Mar-06	The Pigeon Detectives	I'm not Sorry
DTTR009	Single	09-Apr-06	Yes Boss	Get Dropped Quick
DTTR010	Single	10-Apr-06	Shut your eyes & you'll burst into flames	Signal Noise
DTTR011	Single	30-Apr-06	Forward Russia	Nine
DTTR012	Album	14-May-16	Forward Russia	Give me a Wall
DTTR014	Single	11-Jun-06	Yes Boss	More or Less
DTTR015	Single	17-Jul-06	The Pigeon Detectives	You know I love you
DTTR016	Single	23-Jul-06	Forward Russia	Eighteen
DTTR017	Single	15-Oct-06	Shut your eyes & you'll burst into flames	Drop the Decade
DTTR019	Single	22-Oct-06	Yes Boss	Tongues in Knots
DTTR018	Single	06-Nov-06	The Pigeon Detectives	I Found Out
DTTR021	Single	12-Nov-06	Forward Russia	Nineteen
DTTR022	Single	14-Jan-07	Voltage Union	On your marks
DTTR023	Single	22-Jan-07	Sky Larkin	One of Two
DTTR024	Single	28-Jan-07	Yes Boss	See it Through
DTTR020	Album	04-Feb-07	Yes Boss	Look Busy
DTTR025	White Label	12-Feb-07	Forward Russia	Don't be a Doctor
DTTR026	EP	25-Feb-07	The Pigeon Detectives	Romantic Type
DTTR027	Single	07-Mar-07	Sometree	Hands and arrows
DTTR028	Compilation	01-Apr-07	Various	Something I learned Today
DTTR031	Single	08-May-07	The Scare	Bats! Bats! Bats!
DTTR029	EP	20-May-07	The Pigeon Detectives	I'm not Sorry
DTTR030	Album	27-May-07	The Pigeon Detectives	Wait for Me
DTTR033	Single	30-Jul-07	Bobby Cook	Deja Vu
DTTR034	EP	12-Aug-07	The Pigeon Detectives	Take her Back
DTTR035	Compilation	01-Oct-07	Various	Out of the Woods and Trees
DTTR037	Single	15-Oct-07	Sky Larkin	Molten / Keepsakes
DTTR038	Single	22-Oct-07	Grammatics	Shadow Committee
DTTR040	EP	12-Nov-07	The Pigeon Detectives	I Found Out
DTTR039	Single	02-Dec-07	The Wallbirds	The Avenue
DTTR041	Single	07-Apr-08	Grammatics	D.I.L.E.M.M.A
DTTR043	Single	11-May-08	The Pigeon Detectives	This is an Emergency
DTTR044	Album	25-May-08	The Pigeon Detectives	Emergency
DTTR045	Single	27-Jul-08	The Pigeon Detectives	Everybody wants me
DTTR042	Free Download	01-Aug-08	Grammatics	A New Franchise
DTTR047	Single	19-Oct-08	The Pigeon Detectives	Say it like you mean it
DTTR048	Single	16-Nov-08	Grammatics	The Vague Archive
DTTR049	Single	15-Mar-09	Grammatics	The Shadow Committee
DTTR050	Album	22-Mar-09	Grammatics	Grammatics
DTTR051	EP	04-May-09	Various	4 x 12" Volume 1
	EP	26-Jul-09	Grammatics	The Murderer EP
DTTR052	EP	26-Jul-09	Various	4 x 12" Volume 2
DTTR055	Single	27-Sep-09	Grammatics	Double Negative
DTTR050	Album	26-Oct-09	Grammatics	Grammatics (Extended version)
DTTR054	EP	26-Oct-09	Various	4 x 12" Volume 3
DTTR056	EP	08-Feb-10	Various	4 x 12" Volume 4
DTTR057	Single	04-Apr-10	Rose Elinor Dougall	Find Me Out
DTTR058	Compilation	17-Apr-10	Various	Still Occupied though you forget
DTTR061	EP	11-Jul-10	Holy State	Holy State - EP
	Single	21-Nov-10	Holy State	Medicine Hat / Sultan of Sentiment
DTTR064	Single	04-Apr-11	The Pigeon Detectives	Done in Secret
DTTR065	Album	01-Apr-11	The Pigeon Detectives	Up guards and at 'em
DTTR066	EP	16-Apr-11	Various (Brew Records)	Split 10"
DTTR069	Single	17-Jul-11	We Are Losers	Sunset Song / Cheerleader
DTTR070	Single	12-Aug-11	The Pigeon Detectives	Lost
Label Re-Launch				
DTTR075	Album	24-Feb-17	The Pigeon Detectives	Broken Glances
DTTR076	Compilation	22-Apr-17	Various	4 x 12" Volume 5
DTTR078	Album	26-May-17	The Pigeon Detectives	Wait For Me (10th Anniversary Deluxe Edition)
DTTR079	Single	07-Jul-17	FLING	Just A Dog
DTTR080	Single	28-Jul-17	Dead Naked Hippies	I Can't Wait
DTTR081	Single	18-Aug-17	FLING	Annie
DTTR082	EP	22-Sep-17	Dead Naked Hippies	Dead Naked Hippies EP
DTTR083	Single	06-Oct-17	FLING	That's Nice
DTTR084	Single	19-Jan-18	FLING	Bad Day
DTTR085	Single	13-Feb-18	GRDNS	Night Dance
DTTR086	Single	02-Mar-18	FLING	Banjo Billy
DTTR087	EP	13-Apr-18	FLING	The Legend of Banjo Billy EP
DTTR088	Single	20-Mar-18	GRDNS	Juniper
DTTR089	Single	23-Apr-18	Tallsaint	I'm a Woman (After All)
DTTR090	Single	03-May-18	GRDNS	Roulette Love Gun
DTTR091	Single	19-Jun-18	Far Caspian	Holding On
DDTR092	Single	13-Jun-18	FLING	Extra Special
DTTR093	Single	26-Jun-18	Far Caspian	Let's Go Outside
DTTR094	Single	04-Jul-18	Tallsaint	Touch
DTTR095	Single	21-Aug-18	Far Caspian	The Place
DTTR096	Single	04-Oct-18	GRDNS	Venus
DTTR097	Single	27-Sep-18	FLING	Je T'aime
DTTR098	Single	10-Oct-18	Far Caspian	Blue
DTTR099	Single	06-Nov-18	GRDNS	Hydraulic Lover
DTTR100	EP	19-Nov-18	Far Caspian	Between Days EP
DTTR101	Album	22-Feb-19	FLING	Fling or Die
DTTR103	Single	05-Feb-19	Far Caspian	Conversations
DTTR104	Single	19-Feb-19	Tallsaint	Warm Skin
DTTR106	Single	26-Mar-19	Far Caspian	A Dream Of You
DTTR107	Single	26-Apr-19	Tallsaint	Hard Love
DTTR108	Single	02-May-19	Far Caspian	Astoria
DTTR110	Single	13-Jun-19	Tallsaint	Skin Deep
DTTR111	EP	18-Jun-19	Far Caspian	The Heights EP
DTTR112	EP	15-Jul-19	Tallsaint	Hard Love EP
DTTR113	Single	12-Sep-19	Leo Cosmos	Alibis
DTTR114	Single	06-Aug-19	Leo Cosmos	Take My Chances
DTTR115	Single	17-Sep-19	Low Hummer	Don't You Ever Sleep
DTTR116	Single	01-Oct-19	Big City Beach	King Of The French Kiss
DTTR117	Single	24-Oct-19	Low Hummer	I Choose Live News
DTTR118	Single	02-Oct-19	Far Caspian	Conversations (Alternative Version)
DTTR119	Single	06-Nov-19	Tallsaint	Model Effect
DTTR120	Single	07-Nov-19	FLING	One Day
DTTR121	Single	19-Nov-19	Jake Whiskin	Dark Days
DTTR123	Single	28-Nov-19	FLING	Flingle Bells
DTTR124	Single	10-Dec-19	Far Caspian	July
DTTR125	EP	02-Dec-19	GRDNS	Love EP
DTTR126	Single	26-Nov-19	Big City Beach	Dirty Northern Rain
DTTR127	Single	20-Feb-20	Jake Whiskin	Electric
DTTR128	Single	06-Feb-20	Low Hummer	The Real Thing
DTTR130	Single	11-Feb-20	Leo Cosmos	Infinite
DTTR131	Single	03-Mar-20	FLING	Windmill
DTTR132	Single	26-Feb-20	Tallsaint	Feel Like Myself
DTTR133	Single	10-03-20	Far Caspian	Today
DTTR134	Single	23-Apr-20	FLING	Let's Stay In
DTTR135	Single	19-May-20	Low Hummer	Picture Bliss
DTTR136	Single	2-June-20	Big City Beach	Let Go Of The Line
DTTR137	Single	19-May-20	Leo Cosmos	Mr Pink
DTTR138	Single	23-June-20	Jake Whiskin	All Of The Damage Done
DTTR139	Single	19-August-20	Jake Whiskin	Breakneck Speed
DTTR140	Single	08-September-20	Low Hummer	Sometimes I Wish (I Was A Different Person)
DTTR143	Single	03-November-20	Low Hummer	Take Arms
DTTR144	EP	25-September-20	Jake Whiskin	All of the Damage Done EP
DTTR145	Single	12-November-20	Far Caspian	Warning Sign
DTTR141	Single	26-January-21	Jake Whiskin	Slow Motion
DTTR146	Single	4-February-21	Low Hummer	Never Enough
DTTR148	Single	22-April-21	Jake Whiskin	Heavy
DTTR153	Single	20-May-21	Low Hummer	The People, This Place
DTTR149	Single	10-June-21	Jake Whiskin	Running On Fumes
DTTR151	EP	22-July-21	Jake Whiskin	Slow Motion EP
DTTR153	Single	29-July-21	Low Hummer	Human Behaviour
DTTR156	Single	18-Aug-21	Ellur	Moments
DTTR146	Album	17-Sept-21	Low Hummer	Modern Tricks For Living LP
DTTR157	Single	29-Sept-21	Ellur	Burn It All Down
DTTR158	Single	10-Nov-21	Ellur	Migraine
DTTR159	Single	15-Dec-21	Ellur	Innocent (Dreaming)
DTTR160	EP	15-Dec-21	Ellur	Moments EP
DTTR161	Single	08-Dec-21	Jake Whiskin	Cold Morning
DTTR162	Single	26-Jan-22	Jake Whiskin	Satanic Panic Love Song
DTTR163	Single	02-Mar-22	Jake Whiskin	Absence
DTTR169	Single	10-Mar-22	Low Hummer	Talk Shows
DTTR164	Single	11-May-22	Jake Whiskin	Heatwave
DTTR170	Single	30-June-22	Tommy Ashby	Closer
DTTR165	Single	01-July-22	Jake Whiskin	Headfirst Dive
DTTR180	Single	06-July-22	Ellur	Close To You
DTTR183	Single	21-July-22	Sfven	don't jump the gun
DTTR171	Single	10-Aug-22	Tommy Ashby	Moonflowers (Best Friend)
DTTR166	Single	17-Aug-22	Jake Whiskin	Drive You Home feat. Lizzie Reid
DTTR184	Single	31-Aug-22	Sfven	love you
DTTR194	Single	01-Sept-22	Clean Cut Kid	Heavy As (US Only)
DTTR195	Single	01-Sept-22	Clean Cut Kid	Lewis Be Brave (US Only)
DTTR196	Single	01-Sept-22	Clean Cut Kid	Little Black Space (US Only)
DTTR197	Single	14-Sept-22	Clean Cut Kid	Inside My Head (US Only)
DTTR167	Single	16-Sept-22	Jake Whiskin	Long Way Home
DTTR172	Single	22-Sept-22	Tommy Ashby	A Beautiful Day
DTTR181	Single	28-Sept-22	Ellur	Best Face On
DTTR207	Single	30-Sept-22	Low Hummer	Panic Calls
DTTR185	Single	06-Oct-22	Sfven	little things
DTTR208	Single	11-Oct-22	Pet Snake	Jacket
DTTR213	Single	18-Oct-22	Youth Sector	The Ball
DTTR198	Single	19-Oct-22	Clean Cut Kid	She Takes a Pill (US Only)
DTTR173	Single	25-Oct-22	Tommy Ashby	Not That Far To Go
DTTR168	Album	04-Nov-22	Jake Whiskin	Jake Whiskin
DTTR182	Single	09-Nov-22	Ellur	Now I'm Alone
DTTR186	Single	16-Nov-22	Sfven	reload
DTTR174	Single	23-Nov-22	Tommy Ashby	Lifeline
DTTR209	Single	01-Dec-22	Pet Snake	Lotus
DTTR175	Single	15-Dec-22	Tommy Ashby	Floorboards
DTTR200	Single	11-Jan-23	Sfven	bones
DTTR176	Single	18-Jan-23	Tommy Ashby	When Love Goes Dark
DTTR224	Single	03-Feb-23	The Pigeon Detectives	I Found Out (Stephen Street Single Version)
DTTR216	Single	16-Feb-23	Jake Whiskin	Satanic Panic Love Song (home demo)
DTTR223	Album	17-Feb-23	The Pigeon Detectives	Emergency (15 Year Anniversary Version)
DTTR219	Single	21-Feb-23	Youth Sector	A Definitive Guide to Easy Living
DTTR210	Single	22-Feb-23	Pet Snake	Coffee
DTTR201	Single	02-Mar-23	Sfven	fingers through my hair
DTTR177	Album	03-Mar-23	Tommy Ashby	Lamplighter
DTTR218	Single	09-Mar-23	The Pigeon Detectives	Lovers Come and Lovers Go
DTTR217	Album	10-Mar-23	Jake Whiskin	Jake Whiskin (Deluxe)
DTTR226	Single	29-Mar-23	Low Hummer	Connected
DTTR220	Single	05-Apr-23	Youth Sector	Benign Fire in a Small Room
DTTR202	Single	12-Apr-23	Sfven	like that
DTTR178	Single	20-Apr-23	Tommy Ashby	My Old Man
DTTR228	Single	21-Apr-23	The Pigeon Detectives	Falling To Pieces
DTTR230	Single	09-May-23	Ellur	Anywhere
DTTR211	EP	12-May-23	Pet Snake	Bathwater EP
DTTR221	Single	17-May-23	Youth Sector	Free Parking
DTTR203	Single	25-May-23	Sfven	come over
DTTR179	Album	02-June-23	Tommy Ashby	Lamplighter (Deluxe)
DTTR229	Single	09-June-23	The Pigeon Detectives	Summer Girl
DTTR222	EP	16-June-23	Youth Sector	Quarrels
DTTR204	Single	05-July-23	Sfven	no captain
DTTR227	Album	07-July-23	The Pigeon Detectives	TV Show
DTTR232	Single	02-Aug-23	Tommy Ashby	Moonflowers (Binaural Acoustic Version)
DTTR206	EP	10-Aug-23	Sfven	you, green
DTTR233	Single	06-Sept-23	Tommy Ashby	Comeback Kid (Binaural Acoustic Version) [feat. Lydia Clowes]
DTTR234	Single	07-Sept-23	Ellur	Free
DTTR236	Single	04-Oct-23	Tommy Ashby	Not That Far To Go (Binaural Acoustic Version)
DTTR237	Album	01-Nov-23	Tommy Ashby	Binaural Head Acoustic Recordings
DTTR235	Single	08-Nov-23	Ellur	The Woman

== See also ==
- List of record labels
