= Shame for You =

Single by Lily Allen

from the album Alright, Still
- A-side: "Alfie"
- Released: 5 March 2007
- Genre: Jazz; ska
- Length: 4:05
- Label: Regal
- Songwriters: Lily Allen; Blair MacKichan
- Producer: Blair MacKichan

Lily Allen singles chronology
"Littlest Things" (2006)	"Shame for You" / "Alfie" (2007)	"Oh My God" (2007)

Audio video
- "Shame for You" on YouTube

"Shame for You" is a song by British singer-songwriter Lily Allen from her debut studio album, Alright, Still. Written by Allen and Blair MacKichan, while sampling Jackie Mittoo's "Loving You" melody, the song was released as the A-Side to her fourth single, "Alfie", exclusively in the United Kingdom on 5 March 2007, by Regal Recordings.

While no music video had been shot for the song, it was recorded performed live in Allen's 2007 concert tour.

== Background ==
The song, Shame For You is a jazz song with pieces of funk and ska mixed with it. The song is set in the time signature of common time and played in the key of A minor, with Allen's vocals ranging from F#3 to A4. It has a metronome of 80 beats per minute. Allen plays the piano featured in the song. "Shame for You" samples parts of the melodic lines of "Loving You", a Jackie Mittoo song from his album, Evening Time. Lyrically, the song has a "nice-then-naughty approach" and a vindictive streak that belies the sugarcoated sounds around it, while she revels in being the one that got away from her ex-boyfriend. "Shame for You" was performed live, as part of the setlist of Allen's 2007 concert tour, for promoting Alright, Still.

== Reception ==
Lily Allen "Shame for You" (2006)
A sample of "Shame for You", in which Allen sings the chorus.

"Shame for You" was described by BBC reporter Lucy Davies to be a reggae-fused song, which "sticks in your head whilst you desperately suss out why [it's] familiar". Davies went on to say that Allen blatantly lifts the chorus hook from the song "You Don't Love Me (No, No, No)" by Dawn Penn. Mark Pytlik of Pitchfork Media compared the singer's easy comfort with language to that of Mike Skinner, also suggesting she's confident enough that she never overexerts herself lyrically, but uses the song's wilting punchline, "Oh my God you must be joking me / If you think that you'll be poking me", to argue that she is "not above risking a stupid joke either". Sal Cinquemani from Slant Magazine praised the production of "Shame for You", as well as "Alfie", with "plenty of catchy melodies and clever samples", but claimed that Allen lacks charisma.

Having only being released through the "Alfie/Shame for You" single exclusively in the singer's home country, the song peaked at number 15, along with A-side "Alfie", on the UK Singles Chart.

== Track listing and formats ==
- CD Single
1. "Shame for You"
2. "Alfie"
- 7" Vinyl

A. "Shame for You"
B. "Alfie" (explicit)

- Digital download
1. "Alfie" (explicit)
2. "Alfie" (CSS remix)
3. "Alfie" (live at Bush Hall)
4. "Shame for You"
5. "Shame for You" (live at Bush Hall)

== Credits and personnel ==
- Lead vocals, piano - Lily Allen
- Writer(s) - Lily Allen, Blair Mackichan
- Producer - Blair Mackichan
- Audio mixing - Future Cut
- Audio mixing (assisted) - Dan Porter
- Audio mixing (credited to) - Darren Lewis, Iyiola Babalola

== Certifications ==
Certifications for "Alfie/Shame For You"
Region	Certification	Certified units/sales
United Kingdom (BPI)	Silver	200,000^{‡}
^{‡} Sales+streaming figures based on certification alone.
