= 2 Girls 1 Cup =

2007 Brazilian scat-fetish pornographic film and shock video

Hungry Bitches
- DVD cover
- Directed by: Marco Antônio Fiorito (as Marco Villanova)
- Produced by: MFX Media
- Starring: Karla; Latifa
- Cinematography: Roger Wu
- Music by: Hervé Roy
- Production company: MFX Video
- Distributed by: Marco Fiorito
- Release date: 5 January 2007
- Running time: 62 minutes
- Country: Brazil
- Language: Portuguese

2 Girls 1 Cup is the unofficial nickname of the trailer for Hungry Bitches, a 2007 Brazilian scat fetish pornographic film produced by MFX Media. The trailer features two women, one of whom defecates into a cup. Afterwards, the girls take turns in consuming the excrement, and vomiting into each other's mouths. "Lover's Theme" by Hervé Roy plays throughout the video.

The video became one of the best-known shock videos in itself and for the reactions its graphic content elicited from viewers who had not seen it before. Around mid-October 2007, video-sharing sites including YouTube were flooded with videos of the reactions of first-time viewers.

== Production ==
Viewers often speculate that the apparent feces are actually food substances such as refried beans, ice cream, or peanut butter. Some speculate that the vomit is real, but was regurgitated before reaching the stomach and does not contain any gastric acids. In the video, the majority of the vomit does not enter the mouths. The director, Marco Antônio Fiorito, unsuccessfully argued in an American criminal court proceeding that the excrement was actually chocolate ice cream.

== Background ==
The video originated from a Brazilian distributor and pornographer, Marco Antônio Fiorito (born 1 July 1971, in São Paulo), who describes himself as a "compulsive fetishist". Fiorito started having interest producing films in 1994, and in 1996, with his wife, Joelma Brito, using her artistic name Letícia Miller, he began a fetish film business and soon moved on to coprophagia. The film was produced by MFX Video, one of several companies owned by Fiorito.

Authorities in the United States have branded some of Fiorito's films as obscene and filed charges against Danilo Croce, a Brazilian lawyer living in Florida, listed as an officer of a company distributing Fiorito's films in the United States. Fiorito explained that had he known that selling his films in the U.S. was illegal, he would have stopped. In his declaration he stated "I would have stopped because the money is not the main reason that I make these films." He then added, "I have already made fetish movies with scat/feces using chocolate instead of feces. Many actors make scat films, but they don't agree to eat feces."

The first few seconds of the 2 Girls 1 Cup video contain the text "MFX 1209" (the production code for Hungry Bitches) and the URL mfxvideo.com, the website of Fiorito's MFX Video, leading some in the media to incorrectly believe the video is one of the many Croce had to surrender to the Department of Justice but was somehow leaked in the process.

== Reaction videos ==
Example of three people reacting to the video. Numerous videos on YouTube feature users recording their friends’ reactions to the original video, which remains off-camera.

The popularity of 2 Girls 1 Cup was aided by a series of reaction videos; that is, videos depicting people reacting to watching it. Many videos exist on YouTube of users showing the original video (off-camera) to their friends and filming their reactions, although some may be staged. Even Joe Rogan, host of Fear Factor, a show notorious for the disgusting things its contestants are dared to eat, had to turn away in a reaction video posted to his blog. A reaction video starring a Kermit the Frog puppet proved very popular on the community-based website Digg.

In January 2008, Slate documented the reaction video phenomenon with a slideshow featuring various reactions. Violet Blue, an author, described this website as becoming "the new 'tubgirl' and goatse all in one disgusting moment of choco-poo-love" in a San Francisco Chronicle article.

Veteran porn star Ron Jeremy walked off while watching the video on The Playhouse. On the same program, singer Wyclef Jean sat through the whole thing without looking away or showing any apparent reaction, all while eating corn on the cob. Ace Frehley, formerly of Kiss, was shown the video on The Opie and Anthony Show in July 2009 and was unfazed, declaring that "Crazier things than that have happened on the road."

== Impact ==
A short film by guitarist John Mayer was made and uploaded to his blog, also entitled 2 Guys 1 Cup, where Mayer and Best Week Ever correspondent Sherrod Small enjoy Pinkberry frozen yogurt in the same manner that the women in the original consumed the feces. Comedian Conan O'Brien created a parody called One Guy, Two Bowls starring Andy Richter, which shows Andy eating two bowls of soup. This video was created for O'Brien's comedic website Conan.XXX. Filmmakers Justin Roiland and Christian Le Guilloux made a five-minute series called 2 Girls, 1 Cup: The Show for the short film competition site Channel 101. It debuted in first place on 27 January 2008. Canadian comedian Jon Lajoie also made a song named "2 Girls 1 Cup song", which described the activities in the video as if the two women were expressing their love for each other. The music video gained over 15 million views on YouTube.

In 2013, German company Media Markt marketed a cupcake maker dubbed "2 Girls 1 Cup-Cake Maker". The product's slogan was that it made cupcakes "So good that it's impossible to film."

The first episode of sketch comedy show Inside Amy Schumer has a parody in which Amy Schumer auditions for a role in the film.

== Media recognition ==
In the media, the video has been used as an example of the poor content quality of YouTube and similar video-sharing websites, and their tendency towards deliberately shocking content. Esquire magazine showed the video to actor George Clooney during an interview, prompting him to compare it to a rodeo, saying the point of the video was to see "how long you can last". In an episode of Tosh.0, the entire audience is filmed reacting to this video. Host Daniel Tosh called it the World's Largest Reaction Video in terms of number of people being filmed. The cast of Avenue Q, responding to The Muppets' version of "Bohemian Rhapsody", made a video of "We Will Rock You"/"We Are the Champions" (known as "We Will Rock Q"), ending with Nicky surfing the internet, finding 2 Girls 1 Cup (indicated by the soundtrack), and vomiting as the screen fades to black.

The Coca-Cola Company referenced the video in a 2010 promotional campaign for Dr Pepper on Facebook. The promotion, which was open to minors, allowed Facebook users to let Dr Pepper publish embarrassing status updates on their profiles in exchange for a chance to win $1,000. One of the possible status updates was "I watched 2 girls one cup and felt hungry afterwards". Jim Edwards of BNET said that Coca-Cola has full responsibility for allowing the situation to occur, arguing that Coca-Cola selected an advertising agency that openly advertised "profane" advertising campaigns and that the Coca-Cola executive who approved the 2 Girls 1 Cup line failed to do research on what the name meant. The Coca-Cola Company later terminated its relationship with the digital marketing agency responsible for the campaign.

== Legal issues ==
Filmmaker Ira Isaacs was tried multiple times under American federal obscenity statutes for producing and distributing videos featuring scatology and bestiality; a Los Angeles jury ultimately convicted him on five counts in April 2012, and he was sentenced to four years in prison after courts applied the Supreme Court's three-part Miller test for obscenity. Isaacs' defense argued that his films were protected by the First Amendment, but both trial and appellate courts upheld the convictions, emphasizing that the material appealed to prurient interests, was patently offensive, and lacked serious literary, artistic, political, or scientific value.

Danilo Croce was prosecuted for importing and selling similar films, resulting in fines and probation, though criminal charges against the original Brazilian director did not proceed in U.S. courts due to jurisdictional limits.
