= No, No, No (Dawn Penn album) =

Studio album by Dawn Penn
- Released: 1994
- Genre: Reggae
- Length: 57:44
- Label: Big Beat/Atlantic
- Producers: Sly Dunbar; Clive Hunt; Steely & Clevie; Geoffrey Chung; Dylan Powe

Dawn Penn chronology
No, No, No (1994)	Come Again (1996)

Singles from No, No, No
- 1. "You Don't Love Me (No, No, No)" Released: 17 February 1994

Professional ratings
Review scores
Source	Rating
AllMusic	3/5 stars
Billboard	(favorable)
Robert Christgau	(choice cut)
Melody Maker	(favorable)
Music Week	3/5 stars
NME	3/10
Smash Hits	3/5 stars

No, No, No is the debut album by Jamaican reggae singer Dawn Penn, released in 1994.The album was released nearly 30 years after Penn embarked on a recording career, following up the worldwide success of her single "You Don't Love Me (No, No, No)" in 1994. The album met modest chart success.

== Critical reception ==
Alex Henderson from AllMusic complimented No, No, No as "a respectable, decent effort", remarking that songs like "I'll Do It Again" and "Samfi Boy" have "a strong urban contemporary flavor". Larry Flick from Billboard wrote, "Moving beyond the fine first single, 'You Don't Love Me (No, No, No)', the set is fueled by the gems 'I Want a Love I Can See' and 'I'll Do It Again', as well as a dark and penetrating reading of Cat Stevens' 'The First Cut Is the Deepest'." Everett True from Melody Maker viewed it as an "undemanding yet supremely satisfying album", praising the lead single, "You Don't Love Me (No, No, No)", as well as "a gorgeous reading" of "I Want a Love I Can See" and "an uptempo" "The First Cut Is the Deepest".

Alan Jones from Music Week noted that "Penn's delightfully understated style spans reggae and R&B, and gently coaxes the best out of a dozen tunes." He named the "sweetly soulful" "l'll Do It Again" and a "fine version" of "I Want a Love I Can See" "potential hit singles". Pete Stanton from Smash Hits named it Best New Album, writing, "Laid-back, lazing-on-a-beach type reggae, which does get slightly tedious after a while but has enough tummy jigglers like 'Night and Day' and 'Samfi Boy' to keep you going. Imagine a trendy grandma doing Bitty McLean type stuff and you'll know what's going on."

== Track listing ==
No.	Title	Writer(s)	Length
1.	"I Want a Love I Can See"	Smokey Robinson	3:54
2.	"I'm Sorry"	Dawn Penn; Dylan Powe; Clive Hunt	4:10
3.	"You Don't Love Me (No, No, No)" (Extended Mix)	Penn	4:37
4.	"Night and Day"	Horace Swaby	4:55
5.	"My Love Takes Over"	Penn; Powe; Hunt	3:57
6.	"The First Cut Is the Deepest"	Cat Stevens	4:27
7.	"I'll Do It Again"	Dwight Pinkney	4:05
8.	"Hurt"	Penn	3:57
9.	"Samfi Boy"	Penn; Bobby Digital; Geoffrey Chung	5:09
10.	"Keep in Touch"	Chin/Fook; Chung; Rupert Cunningham	4:30
11.	"My Man"	Clevie Brownie; Nadine Sutherland	3:58
12.	"Blue Yes Blue"	Penn	4:52
13.	"You Don't Love Me (No, No, No)" (Remix)	Penn	5:13

== Charts ==
Chart (1994)	Peak position
Austrian Albums Chart	25
German Albums Chart	53
UK Albums Chart	51
US R&B Albums	83
US Top Reggae Albums	5
