= You Don't Love Me (No, No, No) =

1994 single by Dawn Penn

Single by Dawn Penn

from the album No, No, No
- Released: 17 February 1994
- Studio: The Mixing Lab (Kingston, Jamaica)
- Genre: Rocksteady; reggae; dancehall
- Length: 4:37
- Label: Big Beat
- Songwriters: Dawn Penn; Bo Diddley; Willie Cobbs
- Producer: Steely & Clevie

Dawn Penn singles chronology
"Why Did You Lie?" (1967)	"You Don't Love Me (No, No, No)" (1994)	"Night and Day" (1994)

Official video
- No, No No (Official Video) on YouTube

"You Don't Love Me (No, No, No)" is a song by Jamaican singer Dawn Penn, released in February 1994 by Big Beat as the first single from her first studio album, No, No, No (1994). The song's lyrics are credited to Penn, Bo Diddley and Willie Cobbs, and production was handled by Steely & Clevie.

Penn had originally recorded a version of Cobbs' 1960 song "You Don't Love Me" in 1967, incorporating elements of its music and lyrics. It is claimed that the Cobbs song was, in turn, based on Diddley's 1955 song "She's Fine, She's Mine". Thus, both are credited as songwriters on Penn's recording. In 1994, after a 17-year break from the music industry, she re-recorded a dancehall version of the song retitled "You Don't Love Me (No, No, No)".

Penn's 1994 version of the song became a commercial success worldwide. In the United Kingdom, it peaked at number three on the UK Singles Chart. The song also reached the top 20 in Austria and Switzerland, and the top 40 in the Netherlands and New Zealand. In the United States, the single also charted at number 58 on the Billboard Hot 100 chart and at number 42 on the Hot R&B Singles chart. The accompanying music video was directed by Renee Johnston, featuring Penn performing the song in a nightclub. Multiple recording artists have performed cover versions and sampled "You Don't Love Me (No, No, No)" in their own works. Barbadian singer Rihanna remade the song for her debut studio album, Music of the Sun (2005), and American singer Beyoncé performed the song on her I Am... World Tour concert tour (2009–2010). NME magazine ranked it at number 24 in their list of the 50 best songs of 1994, and in 2023, Billboard magazine ranked it among the 500 best pop songs of all time.

== Background ==
Penn first recorded a version of American R&B singer Willie Cobbs's song "You Don't Love Me" in 1967 for Jamaican record label Studio One. At least one writer claims Cobb had based his song on R&B singer Bo Diddley's 1955 recording "She's Fine, She's Mine". Penn's cover of Cobb's song was recorded at Kingston's Studio One by influential producer Coxsone Dodd. Dodd, who had lived for a while in the United States, imported American rhythm and blues records to play for his sound system entertainment businesses. Penn's song used lyrical and melodic elements of Cobbs' song, but was performed in the emerging rocksteady style – a precursor to reggae. It starts out with a drum roll, "then a chugging bass line kicks in and Penn's dreamy voice wails":

No no no, you don't love me and I know now (2×)
'Cause you left me baby, and I got no place to go now ...

Penn's "You Don't Love Me" was a major hit in Jamaica. Based on this success she recorded some other songs, such as "Blue Yes Blue" and a reggae cover version of Scottish singer Lulu's "To Sir with Love". Despite her initial success, Penn decided to take a break from singing, which lasted 17 years. In the late 1980s, after working for banks, accountant agencies, and airlines, she returned to Jamaica in the hopes of reviving her career. In the early 1990s, she re-recorded a version of "You Don't Love Me" with the new title "You Don't Love Me (No, No, No)". The noted Jamaican production team Steely & Clevie produced it, featuring an updated dancehall arrangement. Songwriting is credited to Penn, Cobbs, and Diddley.

== Chart performance ==
In the United States, "You Don't Love Me (No, No, No)" peaked at number 58 on the Billboard Hot 100 chart; it remained on the chart for 12 weeks. It also peaked at number 42 on the Billboard Hot R&B Singles chart, number 41 on the Billboard Hot R&B Airplay chart, and number 45 on the Billboard Hot 100 Airplay chart. In the Flanders region of Belgium, "You Don't Love Me (No, No, No)" debuted at number 44 on the chart week of 23 July 1994, and peaked at number eight in its eighth week; it remained on the chart for a total of 13 weeks. The song placed within the top 20 in Austria and Switzerland, peaking at numbers 13 and 17, respectively. "You Don't Love Me (No, No, No)" also reached number 20 in Israel, number 25 in New Zealand and number 38 in the Netherlands, and peaked at number 41 in both France and Germany. In the United Kingdom, the song debuted at number nine on the UK Singles Chart during the week of 11 June 1994, later peaking at number three and remaining in the position for two consecutive weeks. It also reached number one on the UK Dance Singles chart by Music Week in the same period.

== Critical reception ==
AllMusic editor Alex Henderson remarked that Penn's voice "has held up well over the years, and she's in generally good form". J.D. Considine from The Baltimore Sun stated, "For all the roughneck aggression meted out by most dancehall stars, it's worth noting that Jamaican pop still has its sweet side, and few singers can put that point across as convincingly as Dawn Penn does on 'No, No, No'." He also noted the way her "languid, drawling delivery plays off the slow, hypnotic pulse" of the track. Larry Flick from Billboard magazine felt Penn's "sultry vocal presence on this sailing, instantly memorable dancehall jam belies the pensive nature of the song's story of lost love. An easy-paced groove chugs along with a hip-hop-ish vibe that could prove accessible to crossover and urban formats." Dave Sholin from the Gavin Report stated, "Sure, to catch listeners' attention is this unique production from this Jamaican singing sensation." In his weekly UK chart commentary, James Masterton described it as a "haunting reggae ballad". Neil Kulkarni from Melody Maker praised the track as "a fab summer pop single", writing, "This is as catchy as crabs, with a vocal that'll etch itself on yer mind all summer and a great early Seventies "Lighten Up Volume 4" feel that could make it the best female reggae hit since the Soul Sisters' 'Wreck a Buddy' [from 1969]." Pan-European magazine Music & Media commented, "Nutty dreadlocks where art thou? Is real reggae still being made, with all those pale-faced pretenders around? Yes here, with all the dub production gadgets and all."

Andy Beevers from Music Week gave the song a score of four out of five and named it "a reggae masterpiece." Another editor, Alan Jones, also gave it four out of five and noted that the song was "already massive on pirate radio". He said, "This simple lovers rock tune initially fails to make an impression, but is a real grower." John Kilgo from The Network Forty commented, "It's hard to believe that a woman in her early 50's can spark such a rasta-rhythm tune. Boasting unique vocals with a grooving beat, 'You Don't Love Me (No, No, No)' is sexy and infectious." Angela Lewis from NME wrote, No No No, you don't love me and I know now.... With just one line, Dawn Penn hits the rawest nerve in pop music's angst-ridden heart. If it didn't break you up, check your pulse as you've probably snuffed it. Or you've been extremely lucky in never having experienced the sentiments therein." Paul Ablett from the RM Dance Update stated that "this Studio One classic from the golden age of reggae has been brilliantly re-recorded with the ragga production geniuses Steely & Clevie." He added, "Despite digital drum and bass, it recaptures the original magic and once that horn break kicks in, you'll play it forever – an essential buy if ever there was one." James Hamilton described it as a "gorgeous calmly moaned haunting simple old fashioned Studio One-style 81bm rock steady reggae swayer" in his weekly RM dance column. Alex Kadis from Smash Hits named it a "slow, lilting melody". Charles Aaron from Spin wrote that producers "quirked-up remake of the 1967 reggae classic made my speakers rumble and swoon when a radio DJ finally wised up. Penn's mesmerizing voice plea is so precise and self-possessed that you figure she'll be fine whether her baby asks her to get down on her knees and pray or not. Inspiration for Luscious Jackson's masterfully strokin' 'Daughters of the Kaos'."

== Legacy ==
Charles Aaron from Spin ranked "You Don't Love Me" number 11 in his list of the "Top 20 Singles of the Year" in December 1994. NME magazine ranked it at number 24 in their list of the "50 Best Songs of 1994". The song was nominated in the category for 12-Inch at the NAIRD 1994 and for Tune of the Year at the 1994 International Dance Awards in London. BBC Radio 1 disc jockey Chris Goldfinger named it one of his favourites in 1996, adding, "This is the original version — she's been around a long time. I just love her vocals and the lyrics." In 2003, Q Magazine ranked the song number 477 in their list of the "1001 Best Songs Ever" and in 2004, the magazine featured it in their list of "The 1010 Songs You Must Own".

Blender listed it at 186th place on their "500 Greatest Songs Since You Were Born" in 2005. They wrote: "...dancehall producers Steely & Clevie polished her signature tune into her global comeback hit, wrapping Penn's heartbroken desperation in the sound of a lazy summer's afternoon. Emotional masochism never sounded so sweet." In 2023, Billboard ranked it number 454 in their list of "500 Best Pop Songs of All Time", saying, "The apex of forlorn rocksteady balladry, Dawn Penn's seminal "You Don't Love Me" harnessed the '90s Stateside dancehall boom and turned that energy into a cutting breakup anthem so sharp that even Beyoncé and Rihanna have delivered their own renditions over the years."

== Track listings ==
- Jamaica 7-inch single
1. "You Don't Love Me (No, No, No)"
2. "You Don't Love Me (No, No, No)" (Version)
- UK Cassette single / U.K. 7-inch single
1. "You Don't Love Me (No, No, No)" (Original Radio) – 3:19
2. "You Don't Love Me (No, No, No)" (Remix Edit) – 3:51
- UK 12-inch single
1. "You Don't Love Me (No, No, No)" (Extended Mix) – 4:35
2. "You Don't Love Me (No, No, No)" (Instrumental Dub) – 3:02
3. "You Don't Love Me (No, No, No)" (Original Radio) – 3:19
4. "You Don't Love Me (No, No, No)" (Remix) – 5:11
5. "You Don't Love Me (No, No, No)" (Remix Instrumental) – 6:07
- UK CD single
1. "You Don't Love Me (No, No, No)" (Original Radio) – 3:19
2. "You Don't Love Me (No, No, No)" (Remix Edit) – 3:51
3. "You Don't Love Me (No, No, No)" (Extended Mix) – 4:35
4. "You Don't Love Me (No, No, No)" (Remix) – 5:11
5. "You Don't Love Me (No, No, No)" (Instrumental Dub) – 3:02

== Charts ==
=== Weekly charts ===
Weekly chart performance for "You Don't Love Me (No No No)"
Chart (1994)	Peak position
Australia (ARIA)	74
Austria (Ö3 Austria Top 40)	13
Belgium (Ultratop 50 Flanders)	8
Europe (Eurochart Hot 100)	15
Europe (European AC Radio)	13
Europe (European Dance Radio)	9
Europe (European Hit Radio)	11
Finland (Suomen virallinen lista)	15
France (SNEP)	41
Germany (GfK)	41
Iceland (Íslenski Listinn Topp 40)	11
Ireland (IRMA)	22
Israel (Israeli Singles Chart)	20
Netherlands (Dutch Top 40)	33
Netherlands (Single Top 100)	38
New Zealand (Recorded Music NZ)	25
Scottish Singles Sales (Official Charts)	10
Switzerland (Schweizer Hitparade)	17
UK Singles (Official Charts)	3
UK Dance (Official Charts)	31
UK Airplay (Music Week)	9
UK Dance (Music Week)	1
UK Club Chart (Music Week)	25
US Billboard Hot 100	58
US Dance Singles Sales (Billboard)	10
US Hot R&B/Hip-Hop Songs (Billboard)	42
US Cash Box Top 100	58

=== Year-end charts ===
Year-end chart performance for "You Don't Love Me (No No No)"
Chart (1994)	Position
Belgium (Ultratop)	70
UK Singles (OCC)	51
UK Airplay (Music Week)	37

== Certifications ==
Certications and sales for "You Don't Love Me (No No No)"
Region	Certification	Certified units/sales
New Zealand (RMNZ)	Platinum	30,000^{‡}
United Kingdom (BPI)	Gold	400,000^{‡}
^{‡} Sales+streaming figures based on certification alone.

== Covers and other versions ==
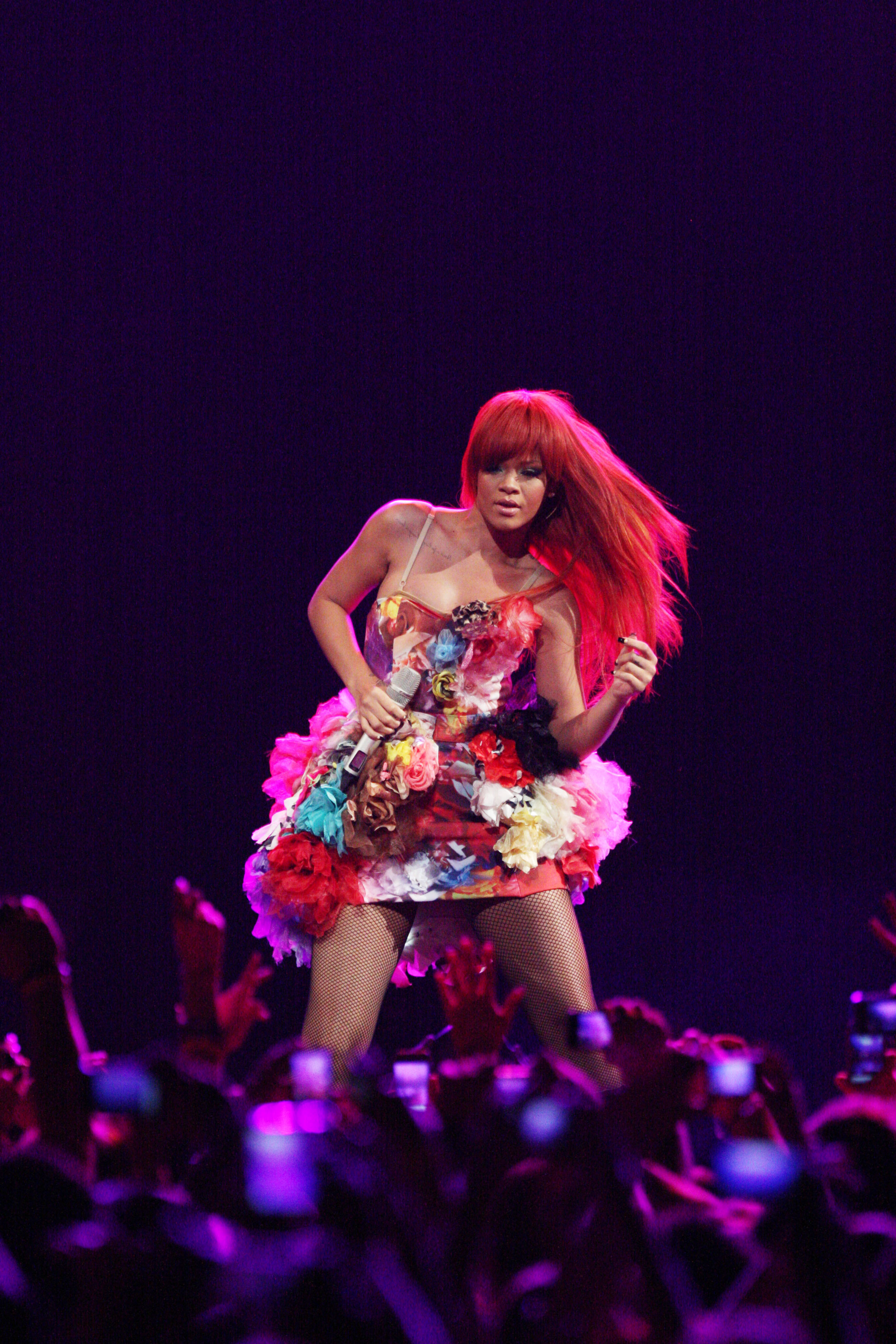
Rihanna (pictured) recorded a cover of the song.

In 1994, French rapper and singer Melaaz released a cover version titled "Non, Non, Non" with French lyrics.

Reggae group Aswad sampled "You Don't Love Me (No, No, No)" for their song "You're No Good", taken from their album Rise and Shine (1994). "You're No Good" peaked at number 35 on the UK Singles Chart on 2 February 1995.

Female rapper Eve released a cover version with brothers Damian Marley and Stephen Marley on her 2001 album Scorpion. Maurice Bottomley for PopMatters reviewed the song, writing "Stephen Marley leads Eve through a note-for-note re-creation of the Dawn Penn (‘90s version) rocksteady classic 'No, No, No'. She sings it well enough, but it adds nothing to the original (literally)."

British music DJ's Hexstatic included a mix of the song on "Mr. Scruff's Ninja Tune Megamix" (Hexstatic Edit) by DJ Food on their 2002 DJ mix album Listen & Learn.

Barbadian singer Rihanna recorded a cover version of the song as a duet with Jamaican DJ Vybz Kartel, for her debut studio album Music of the Sun (2005). It was produced by Evan Rogers, Carl Sturken and D. "Supa Dups" Chin-quee. Jason Birchmeier, writing for AllMusic, described Rihanna's cover as "catchy", while Chantal Jenoure, writing for The Jamaica Observer, labelled it as "hilarious".

English singer Lily Allen sampled the song for her "Shame for You", included on her debut studio album, Alright, Still (2006). Lucy Davies for the BBC reviewed the song, writing "Many of her reggae-fused songs stick in your head whilst you desperately suss out why they're familiar, but she rips off her influences with a comic acknowledgement, like 'Shame for You', which blatantly lifts the chorus hook from 'You Don't Love Me (No No No)' by Dawn Penn".

In 2007, American rapper Ghostface Killah covered the song on his compilation album, Hidden Darts: Special Edition, which consists of his rare album B-sides, unreleased songs and mixtape tracks.

American singer Beyoncé performed the song as part of a medley with her own song "Baby Boy" on her I Am... World Tour concert tour (2009–2010). After being lifted out of a 20-foot train by a harness and over the audience, she was lowered to the B-stage, where she finished "Baby Boy" and continued with Penn's "You Don't Love Me (No, No, No)". It was later included on the CD/DVD release of the tour. She performed a similar medley when she headlined at the 2018 Coachella Valley Music and Arts Music Festival, and during the first few European shows of her and her husband Jay-Z’s, OTR II Tour (2018), their second co-headlining, all-stadium tour together.

The song was sampled in the 2021 Mary J Blige single Amazing featuring DJ Khaled.
