= Littlest Things =

Single by Lily Allen

from the album Alright, Still
- B-side: "U Killed It"; "Everybody's Changing"
- Released: 11 December 2006
- Studio: Allido (New York City); Sarm West (London)
- Genre: R&B
- Length: 3:02
- Label: Regal
- Songwriter(s): Lily Allen; Mark Ronson; Pierre Bachelet; Hervé Roy; Santi White
- Producer(s): Mark Ronson

Lily Allen singles chronology
"LDN" (2006)	"Littlest Things" (2006)	"Alfie" / "Shame for You" (2007)

Music video
- "Littlest Things" on YouTube

"Littlest Things" is a song by English singer-songwriter Lily Allen from her debut studio album, Alright, Still (2006). Written by Allen and Mark Ronson, the song was released as the third single of the album on 11 December 2006 by Regal Recordings. It incorporates a piano sample from Pierre Bachelet and Hervé Roy's music from the softcore pornography film Emmanuelle, for which they were credited as co-writers, as the lyrics tackle the singer dealing with the departure of her boyfriend, while reminiscing about their time together. The song was created in a New York studio, after Allen had met Ronson, who was impressed by her previous work and offered her different samples.

Contemporary critics gave the song mostly positive reviews, with some stating that it contained Allen's sweetest lyrical moments. The single peaked at number twenty-one on the UK Singles Chart, being her first single not to reach the top twenty in the United Kingdom. The accompanying music video portrayed a view over the mundane moments of a dying relationship, with Allen watching herself and her ex-boyfriend together. It was directed by Nima Nourizadeh and was mainly shot in black and white. The song was performed live during her 2007 concert tour and also during her 2009 concert tour.

== Background ==
After obtaining commercial success with first two singles, "Smile" and "LDN", Allen decided to promote the album by releasing "Littlest Things". The song was composed in New York, where Allen travelled after she had met producer Mark Ronson when at lunch with her then boyfriend, Seb. There, she told him she was a singer and gave him a copy of her demo CD. He was impressed by her song "Smile" and asked her to work together. Regarding the process of composing the song, Ronson stated:

We spent a day together and worked on a couple of things, and went to record shops where I played samples to her. Then I wrote the piano and guitar bit to "Littlest Things", and she sat down and scribbled for about an hour and finished the lyrics. We went into the booth to record the song. She originally wanted to do a Mike Skinner thing, rapping the verse and singing the chorus. But I asked her to sing it all, and she just made up the whole melody on the spot, and sang this amazing solo. At that moment I realised that this girl has a really special gift.

In regards to composing the song and its lyrical meaning, Allen noted that,

Mark's got a very good ear. He's very relaxed in the studio and very thoughtful. There's not really any pressure working there, because he's got his own studio so he doesn't have time constraints.

The song was called "Littlest Things" and was about having broken up with my boyfriend, because Seb and I had split up for a few months. We've since got back together. It must have been quite awkward for Mark because Seb was his friend, but being fresh out of a relationship I wanted to write about what was on my mind.

Mark came up with the music first, then I came up with the words and we fitted it all together into a melody. That's the way I normally make songs – I write everything in the studio – and it obviously means that producers are very important to me. It's a complete joint effort.

In 2007, a Taiwanese singer Tarcy Su recorded a version in Mandarin titled Bye Bye Baby for her 15th studio album in Mandarin, Tarcy. Left-Hander．Revolving Door, which was the second and last album under her label Universal Music Taiwan before moving to her new music label B'in Music.

== Music structure and lyrics ==
Lily Allen "Littlest Things" (2006)
A sample of "Littlest Things" where the chorus is sung.

Musically, the song is written in the time signature of common time and set in the key of E minor, having a metronome of 82 beats per minute. It has a basic sequence of Em—Am—D7—G—Em—Am—F♯7—B as its chord progression, while the piano and guitar are used for the background music. "Littlest Things" samples elements from "Emmanuelle in the Mirror" and the "Theme from Emmanuelle (Instrumental)", which are written by Pierre Bachelet and Hervé Roy for the 1974 French softcore pornographic film Emmanuelle. It does not, though, sample "Karma Police" by Radiohead, contrary to popular misinterpretations. The lyrics describe a post-relationship overview and the way one reminiscences about it. Alex Petridis from The Guardian describes them as dealing with "misery and sex in equal measure", while reporting that Ronson asked Allen to sing in her London accent.

== Critical reception ==
"Littlest Things" received mostly positive reviews from music critics. Heather Phares from AllMusic complimented the song, saying the ballad softens Allen's rough image and celebrates "the mundane moments of a dying relationship", whereas Blender reporter Jon Dolan considers it a "forlorn single", where the singer writes about the terror of being in a relationship "with white-knuckled worry over a snip of florid piano from a '70s soft-core porn flick". While analysing Alright, Still, The Guardian reviewer, Sophie Heawood, described the lyrics as the "perfect description of missing someone: 'We'd spend the whole weekend lying in our own dirt / I was just so happy in your boxers and your T-shirt'." Mark Pytlik from Pitchfork gave a positive review, saying that "'Littlest Things' is a supple piano-tickler that provides one of Allen's sweetest lyrical moments while simultaneously leaving Ms. Dynamite in the dust on the R&B balladeering front". He believed that the song is made out of Allen's "comfort zone" of songs such as "Smile", the result being of "high order, if not a bit more erratic". IGN reviewer Todd Gilchrist named the song as the album's "most affecting tune", while thought it "compiles a sad and beautiful checklist of the intimate moments she no longer shares with her dearly departed boyfriend".

== Commercial reception ==
The single debuted at number fifty-three in the singer's home country and later rose to twenty-one, which became its peak. It was Allen's lowest position on the UK Singles Chart at that time, being the only song to miss the top twenty, until "Who'd Have Known" peaked at thirty-nine in 2009. Though it did not enter the main chart in the Flanders region of Belgium, the single obtained position thirteen on Ultratip, a continuation of the chart.

== Music video ==
A monochrome shot of Allen watching her former self with her boyfriend in the official music video for "Littlest Things".

The music video was directed by Nima Nourizadeh, having previously worked with Allen on the second music video for its predecessor single "LDN", and later again for the Mark Ronson collaboration "Oh My God", and released on 11 December 2006. It opens with an aerial shot of a piano which begins to play by itself, and then moves to reveal a film set. Allen stands on a lamppost, wearing a raincoat, with lights, a camera and directors surrounding her. The image zooms into the camera from the studio and turns the video black-and-white, with the story coming to life, as the singer begins the first verse. From the lamppost she is able to see her former self walking down the street with her boyfriend. While they enter a building, a light comes out in one of the windows, revealing their silhouettes kissing. The caption changes, with the two of them dancing, while a man plays the piano in the background; as he dips her and holds this position, she continues to sing. The camera zooms out to see a heart shaped window surrounding the two that opens and changes to a picture on Allen's wall. She is alone in a room, staring at a mirror. Her hair is let down and she is wearing a white nightgown. The piano is seen again playing itself, as the image shifts to the window, where Allen is again portrayed leaning against the lamppost in the street, as in the beginning of the video. She again looks at the silhouettes in the window of the building, as it collapses on her, once again changing the scene. This time, the singer is looking through another window, and then turns around to a mirror which captures a door. The former Allen with the raincoat walks through with her boyfriend, as their shadows are seen kissing. The image changes to Allen from the film set, zooming out from the camera's viewing piece, making the video in colour again.

== Track listings ==
- UK CD single
1. "Littlest Things" – 3:04
2. "U Killed It" – 4:27
- UK DVD single
1. "Littlest Things" (Video) – 3:04
2. "Littlest Things" (Audio) – 3:04
3. "Everybody's Changing" – 3:48
4. "Littlest Things" (Instrumental) – 3:04
- Digital download
1. "Littlest Things" – 3:04
2. "U Killed It" – 4:27
3. "Littlest Things" (Instrumental) – 3:04
4. "Littlest Things" (Acoustic Live at Bush Hall) – 3:45
- 7" vinyl
1. "Littlest Things" – 3:04
2. "Everybody's Changing" – 3:48

== Credits and personnel ==
Credits adapted from the liner notes of Alright, Still.

- Lily Allen – vocals
- Mark Ronson – production, recording, beats, harp, synth strings, percussion
- Vaughan Merrick – mixing
- Rob Smith – recording
- Kieran Panesar – recording assistance
- Tim Burrell – mastering
- Tim Debney – mastering

== Charts ==
Chart (2006–07)	Peak position
Belgium (Ultratip Flanders)	13
Denmark Airplay (Tracklisten)	5
South Korea International Singles (Gaon)	136
UK Singles (OCC)	21
