= Pick Up the Pieces (Put It Back) =

1993 single by Billy Ocean

Single by Billy Ocean

from the album Time to Move On
- Released: 1 June 1993
- Length: 4:32 (album version); 3:23 (radio mix)
- Label: Jive
- Songwriter(s): Billy Ocean; Wycliffe Johnson; Clevie Browne
- Producer(s): Steely & Clevie

Billy Ocean singles chronology
"Pressure" (1993)	"Pick Up the Pieces (Put It Back)" (1993)	"Everything's So Different Without You" (1993)

"Pick Up the Pieces (Put It Back)" is a song by Trinidadian-British singer Billy Ocean, released by Jive on 1 June 1993 as the second single from his eighth studio album, Time to Move On. The song was written by Ocean and Steely & Clevie (Wycliffe Johnson and Clevie Browne), and was produced by Steely & Clevie. It reached number 126 in the UK Singles Chart.

== Critical reception ==
Upon its release, the Arbroath Herald awarded "Pick Up the Pieces (Put It Back)" a nine out of ten rating, with the reviewer noting that the "bright and breezy number" was the "best track" from Time to Move On. They described it as "so catchy that we would not be surprised to see it in the charts" and noted the CD single's "five distinct mixes". Andrew Hirst of the Huddersfield Daily Examiner praised it as a "dance meander that shuffles soulfully along". Andrew Smith, writing for the Newcastle Journal, described the song as a "moderate disco track with [a] good beat", but felt Ocean had "definitely done better". John Greenwood of the Halifax Evening Courier commented, "Hypnotic, is not so original, a groove. OK by most people's standards, not up to those Ocean has set himself."

== Track listing ==
7–inch single (UK and Europe)

1. "Pick Up The Pieces (Put It Back)" – 4:32
2. "Pick Up The Pieces (Put It Back)" (Kevin Saunderson Radio Mix) – 3:23

12–inch single (UK and Europe)

1. "Pick Up The Pieces (Put It Back)" (Reese Club Riot Mix) – 5:43
2. "Pick Up The Pieces (Put It Back)" (Original Mix) – 4:32
3. "Pick Up The Pieces (Put It Back)" (Reese Renaissance Dub Workout) – 4:22
4. "Pick Up The Pieces (Put It Back)" (Kevin Saunderson Radio Mix) – 3:23

CD single (UK and Europe)

1. "Pick Up The Pieces (Put It Back)" (Original Mix) – 4:32
2. "Pick Up The Pieces (Put It Back)" (Kevin Saunderson Radio Mix) – 3:23
3. "Pick Up The Pieces (Put It Back)" (Reese Renaissance Dub Workout) – 4:22
4. "Pick Up The Pieces (Put It Back)" (Reese Club Riot Mix) – 5:43
5. "Pick Up The Pieces (Put It Back)" (Reese Instrumental Dub) – 5:03

== Personnel ==
"Pick Up the Pieces (Put It Back)"

- Billy Ocean – vocals
- Wycliffe Johnson (Steely) – keyboards
- Clevie Browne – drums, percussion

Production

- Steely & Clevie – production
- Nigel Green – engineering (original mix)
- Kevin Saunderson – remixing (all remixes)
- Chris Andrews – engineering (all remixes)
- Derek Jamerson – keyboards (all remixes)

== Charts ==
Chart (1993)	Peak position
UK Singles Chart (OCC)	126
