= Reaction video =

Video in which people react to something

YouTuber Brandon Reacts TV reacting to The Dover Boys at Pimento University (1942), a Merrie Melodies cartoon

A reaction video, or a react video, is a video in which one or more persons react to something. Videos showing the emotional reactions, criticism or commentary of people viewing movies, television series episodes, film trailers, music videos, news, or other media are numerous and popular on online video hosting services such as YouTube and live-streaming services such as Twitch. The depicted persons may not even be aware that they are being recorded. In many cases, the video to which people are reacting is shown within the reaction video, letting viewers see what is being reacted to.

The question of if, and when, reaction videos constitute a fair use of intellectual property, rather than an appropriation of the reacted-to content, and a copyright infringement, has generated controversy and is a subject of discussion and debate.

== History ==
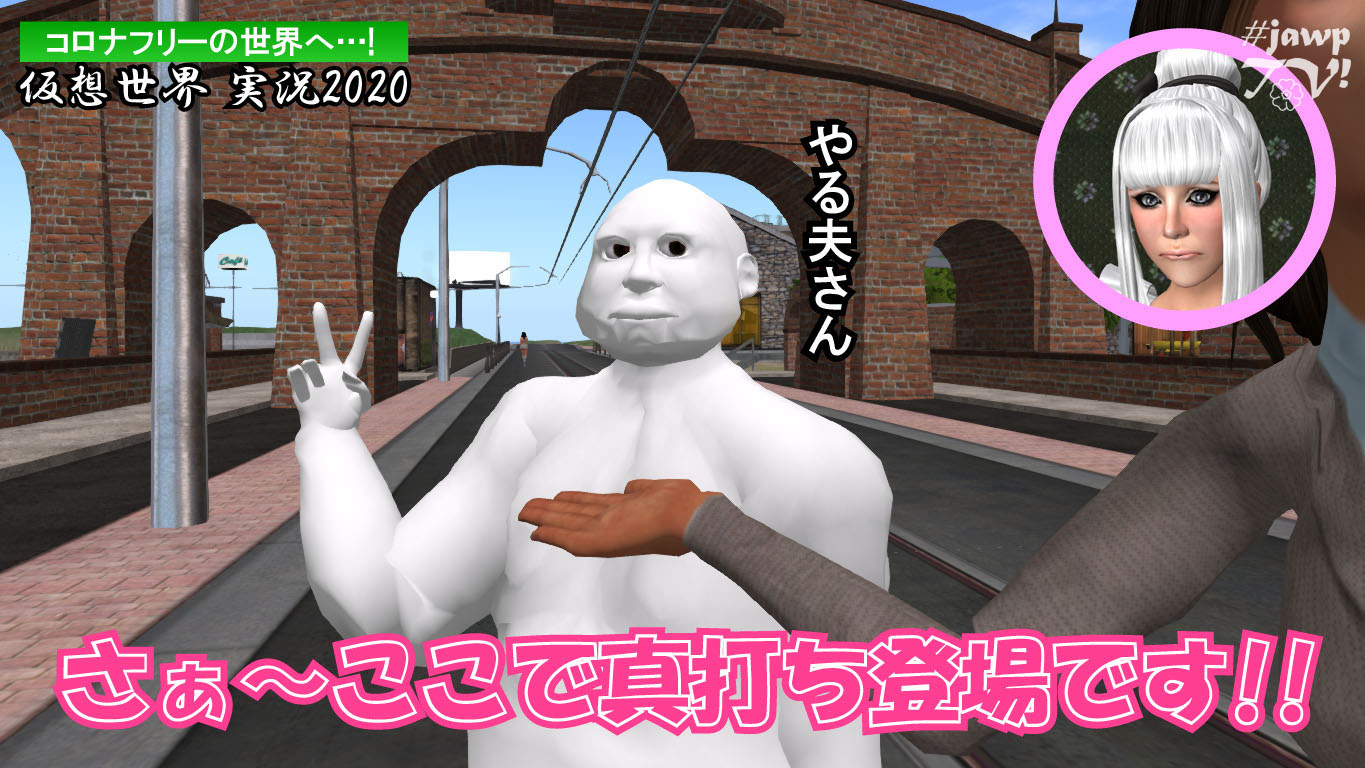
Example of a "waipu box" in the top-right corner depicting a viewer reacting to a Japanese variety show

On television, reaction clips have long been a feature of Japanese variety shows, showing tarento and other celebrities reacting to video clips. An evolution of earlier 1970s Japanese TV quiz shows that featured audience participants responding to questions, Fuji Television's Naruhodo! The World in 1981 introduced a format where a panel of celebrities and comedians watched brief videos and answered questions on the video. This eventually evolved into the "waipu" (Note: borrowed from English word wipe into Japanese with a different meaning) format, where a "waipu box" superimposed on the corner of the screen shows a celebrity or tarento reacting to a video clip. This reaction format is still widely used in Japanese variety shows, where it is the equivalent of a laugh track on American television shows.

Three people getting shocked watching the 2 Girls 1 Cup video. Many such videos exist on YouTube of users showing the original video (off-camera) to their friends and filming their reactions.

One of the first online viral reaction videos showed a child reacting to the "Scary Maze Game" prank on YouTube in 2006. Beginning in 2007, reaction videos began to proliferate on the Internet. Among their first topics were reactions to the shock video 2 Girls 1 Cup. By 2011, videos of people recording themselves reacting to film trailers had become a staple of services such as YouTube. The numerous reaction videos for particularly popular or shocking television events, such as the 2013 Game of Thrones episode "The Rains of Castamere", have themselves become the subject of commentary.

In 2013, the British TV channel Channel 4 converted the reaction video format into a TV show, Gogglebox. In this reality show, families or groups of friends watch and discuss popular television broadcasts of the previous week in their own homes. The format was successful and spawned licensed adaptations in other television markets.

== Music reaction videos ==
Music reaction videos involve people filming themselves and their reactions to a song, or a music video for a song, as they listen to it for the first time. Some videos offer a contrast with the listener being outside of the traditional audience for the music. The New York Times noted there is a racial dynamic to many reaction videos which involve younger, Black listeners responding positively to music by older, white musicians.

Some YouTube channels doing music reaction videos have become very successful, with major music labels reaching out to channels to promote their artists. When Tim and Fred Williams's reaction video to Phil Collins' "In the Air Tonight" went viral, it pushed the song to #2 on the iTunes chart.

== Reception ==
Commenting on the phenomenon, Sam Anderson described it as encapsulating the "fundamental experience of the Internet" in that it involved watching screens on which people watched screens, in a potentially infinite regression. The first reaction videos for the gross-out 2 Girls 1 Cup allowed people, according to Anderson, to "experience its dangerous thrill without having to encounter it directly—like Perseus looking at Medusa in the reflection of his shield". But much like the later videos featuring reactions to items of popular culture, Anderson wrote, such videos provide the appeal of experiencing, "at a time of increasing cultural difference, the comforting universality of human nature" in showing people of all backgrounds reacting similarly to a shared cultural experience.

Witney Seibold derided reaction videos as "graceless" and "narcissistic" because they merely reflect immediate emotional reactions, and doubted that the reactions of a person aware of being filmed could in fact reflect the honest emotional response promised by the format.

The neuroscientist Lisa Aziz-Zadeh suggested a role for mirror neurons in allowing us to share the experience of the person we are watching in a video.

== Legal status ==
The video to which people react is typically shown within the reaction video, allowing the reaction video's viewers to see what is being reacted to. This has led to controversy regarding the extent and conditions under which reacting to another creator's content falls under the doctrine of fair use in US law.

In the case of Bilibili v. Youku (2023), Bilibili was found liable in a copyright infringement lawsuit concerning reaction videos on its platform related to the TV series Word of Honor, and was ordered to compensate Youku 350,000 yuan. The People's Court of Yangpu District, Shanghai, determined that reaction videos did not qualify as fair use and that the creators had not gained proper authorization, leading to an "infringement of the rights to information network transmission" of the involved work.

== See also ==
- React (media franchise)
