= Everyday I Love You Less and Less =

2005 single by Kaiser Chiefs

Single by Kaiser Chiefs

from the album Employment
- B-side: "Another Number"; "Seventeen Cups"; "Not Surprised"; "The Letter Song"
- Released: 16 May 2005
- Genre: New wave
- Length: 3:37
- Label: B-Unique
- Songwriters: Ricky Wilson; Andrew White; Simon Rix; Nick Baines; Nick Hodgson
- Producer: Stephen Street

Kaiser Chiefs singles chronology
"Oh My God" (2005)	"Everyday I Love You Less and Less" (2005)	"I Predict a Riot" / "Sink that Ship" (2005)

Music video
- "Everyday I Love You Less and Less" on YouTube

"Everyday I Love You Less and Less" is a song by English indie rock band Kaiser Chiefs. It is the opening track on their first album, Employment (2005), and was released on the B-Unique label as the album's third single (not counting re-issues) on 16 May 2005. The song peaked at number 10 on the UK Singles Chart, their second top-10 single of the year. Outside the UK, the song peaked at number 52 in the Netherlands.

== Background ==
Singer Ricky Wilson described the song as a "hate ballad" and added, "Usually bands release for their third single a love ballad but we decided to do the opposite. It's for anyone who's ever split up with someone and they don't leave you alone." Guitarist Simon Rix added: "You think it's going to be quite bouncy but it's actually as negative as you can be!"

Dorian Lynskey of The Guardian wrote that the Kaiser Chiefs had been labeled as has-beens by 2003-2004, and they were desperate to build a fanbase to impress record labels: "The need to make an impression while bottom of the bill in a tiny venue explains all the ohhhhhhs and nanananas and oft-repeated choruses that set up shop in the listener's brain after the first listen."

== Music video ==
The music video was directed by Tim Pope. It features the band wearing skeleton costumes.

== Track listings ==
UK CD1

1. "Everyday I Love You Less and Less" (Spike Stent remix)
2. "Another Number" (the Cribs cover)

UK CD2 and Australasian CD single

1. "Everyday I Love You Less and Less" (Spike Stent remix)
2. "Seventeen Cups"
3. "Not Surprised"
4. "Everyday I Love You Less and Less" (video)

UK 7-inch picture disc

A. "Everyday I Love You Less and Less" (Spike Stent remix)
B. "The Letter Song"

European CD single

1. "Everyday I Love You Less and Less" (Spike Stent remix)
2. "Take My Temperature" (live at Pinkpop)
3. "Modern Way" (live at Pinkpop)

== Charts ==
=== Weekly charts ===
Chart (2005)	Peak position
Netherlands (Single Top 100)	52
Scottish Singles Sales (Official Charts)	9
UK Singles (Official Charts)	10
UK Indie (Official Charts)	1

=== Year-end charts ===
Chart (2005)	Position
UK Singles (OCC)	82

== Certifications ==
Region	Certification	Certified units/sales
United Kingdom (BPI)	Platinum	600,000^{‡}
^{‡} Sales+streaming figures based on certification alone.
