= Pressure (Billy Ocean song) =

1993 single by Billy Ocean

Single by Billy Ocean

from the album Time to Move On
- B-side: "On Your Knees"
- Released: 25 January 1993
- Length: 4:42 (album version); 4:04 (single version)
- Label: Jive
- Songwriter(s): Billy Ocean; Wycliffe Johnson; Clevie Browne
- Producer(s): Steely & Clevie

Billy Ocean singles chronology
"I Sleep Much Better (In Someone Else's Bed)" (1990)	"Pressure" (1993)	"Pick Up the Pieces (Put It Back)" (1993)

"Pressure" is a song by Trinidadian-British singer Billy Ocean, released on 25 January 1993 as the lead single from his eighth studio album, Time to Move On. The song was written by Ocean, Wycliffe Johnson and Clevie Browne, and produced by Steely & Clevie. "Pressure" reached No. 55 on the UK Singles Chart and remained in the Top 100 for two weeks. It remains Ocean's last appearance on the chart.

== Background ==
"Pressure" was inspired by Ocean's wrongful arrest in 1991 on the suspicion of drug dealing. On the evening of 17 October 1991, Ocean was stood outside a community hall in Notting Hill, where he taught children in a steel band, when he was approached by two men, who he knew only as acquaintances. When the police suddenly arrived on the scene, one of the men dropped a package containing hash on the ground and tried to flee. One of the police officers accused Ocean of supplying drugs and he was also arrested. He protested his innocence and the charges against the singer were subsequently dropped, with Ocean receiving a full apology from the police. Speaking to the Bournemouth Evening Echo in 1993, Ocean said, "Pressure is a word that incorporates a lot of different emotions. For me pressure was my little incident I had with the police as with regards to drug dealing – of which I was completely innocent."

== Critical reception ==
Upon its release, pan-European magazine Music & Media described "Pressure" as a "slightly disguised Italo dance tune". Andrew Hirst of the Huddersfield Daily Examiner noted that "Billy's back with a slice of dance that certainly keeps the pressure on". Penny Kiley of the Liverpool Echo wrote, "He's kept up with new music – this is a solid dance track with some familiar samples. And the words sound heartfelt." Jo Cole of the Torquay Herald Express considered the "up-beat dance track" to be "very different to the Billy Ocean of the mid-Eighties that we all knew and loved", but "still with its roots entrenched in the Caribbean". She continued, "The stilted way the track was sung added to the whole effect of being under pressure, but more could be expected from the middle of the track – it never quite reached its potential."

== Track listing ==
- 7" single
1. "Pressure" (U.S. Radio Edit) - 4:04
2. "On Your Knees" - 5:00
- 12" single
1. "Pressure" (Stevo's Extended Club Mix) - 6:00
2. "Pressure" (U.S. Radio Edit) - 4:04
3. "Pressure" (U.K. 12" Extended Mix) - 6:23
4. "Pressure" (U.K. Dub Mix 1) - 5:08
- 12" single (European promo)
1. "Pressure" (Extended Club Mix) - 6:25
2. "Pressure" (Sparse Mix) - 5:16
3. "Pressure" (Dub Mix) - 5:20
- CD single (UK release)
1. "Pressure" (U.S. Radio Edit) - 4:04
2. "Pressure" (Stevo's Extended Club Mix) - 6:00
3. "Pressure" (U.K. 12" Extended Mix) - 6:23
4. "On Your Knees" - 5:00
- CD single (European release)
1. "Pressure" (U.S. Radio Edit) - 4:04
2. "Pressure" (Mr Lee's Radio Dance Mix) - 4:15
3. "Pressure" (U.K. 12" Extended Mix) - 6:23
4. "On Your Knees" - 5:00

== Personnel ==
Pressure

- Billy Ocean - vocals
- Dalton Browne, Danny Browne - guitar
- Wycliffe Johnson - keyboards
- Clevie Browne - drums, percussion

Production

- Steely & Clevie - producers
- Colin York - recording engineer on "Pressure" and "On Your Knees"
- Chris Trevett - mixing engineer on "Pressure" and "On Your Knees", recording engineer on "On Your Knees", remix engineer on "Stevo's Extended Club Mix"
- Anthony Saunders - recording engineer on "On Your Knees"
- Mr. Lee - remix and additional production on "Stevo's Extended Club Mix" and "Mr Lee's Radio Dance Mix"
- Stephen George - remix engineer on "Stevo's Extended Club Mix"
- Tommy D. - remix and additional production on "Extended Mix" and "Dub Mix"
- Gary Wilkinson - remix engineer
- Tom Coyne - mastering

== Charts ==
Chart (1993)	Peak position
Australia (ARIA)	145
Belgium (Ultratop 50 Flanders)	39
Netherlands (Dutch Top 40 Tipparade)	4
Netherlands (Single Top 100)	44
UK Singles (OCC)	55
UK Club Chart (Music Week)	42
