= LDN (song) =

2006 single by Lily Allen

Single by Lily Allen

from the album Alright, Still
- B-side: "Nan, You're a Window Shopper"; "Naïve"; "Knock 'Em Out"
- Released: 25 September 2006
- Length: 3:10
- Label: Regal
- Songwriters: Lily Allen; Iyiola Babalola; Darren Lewis; Tommy McCook
- Producer: Future Cut

Lily Allen singles chronology
"Smile" (2006)	"LDN" (2006)	"Littlest Things" (2006)

Music video
- "LDN" on YouTube

"LDN" (shorthand for "London") is a song by English singer-songwriter Lily Allen. It was co-written by Future Cut, and features a Colombian porro from the country's Caribbean coast. The song was originally released on limited-edition 7-inch vinyl (500 copies) in the UK in early 2006, accompanied by album track "Knock 'Em Out". It was reissued in September 2006 as the second single from Allen's debut album Alright, Still. The re-release peaked at number six on the UK Singles Chart. "LDN" was ranked number 30 on Rolling Stone's list of the "100 Best Songs of 2007".

== Background ==
Regal Records gave Allen £25,000 in 2005, when she signed to the label, a fact which she considered to be a "small development idea". The money was to produce an album, but the label were unable to provide much support due to its preoccupation with other releases. Taking advice from Lady Sovereign, Allen created an account on MySpace and began posting demos in November 2005. By March 2006, they attracted thousands of listeners, and 500 limited edition 7-inch vinyl singles of "LDN", one of the demos, were rush-released and sold for as much as £40. Thus the song became Allen's first single.

Allen also produced two mixtapes to promote her work. As she accumulated tens of thousands of MySpace friends, The Observer Music Monthly took interest. Few people outside of her label's A&R department had heard of Allen, so the label was slow in responding to publications which wanted to report about her. Her label was displeased with the sound of the demos, so it assigned the singer to top producers and songwriters, who approved some of her songs for the album, Alright, Still. Among the songs Allen claimed she was happy with was "LDN".

== Composition ==
"LDN"
A 20-second sample of the song, which prominently features a sample of "Reggae Merengue".

"LDN" is mobile-phone text language for 'London'. The lyric comprises Allen describing a bicycle ride through her hometown of London. Set to a cheerful tune, the lyric first appears to describe an innocent scene, "A fella looking dapper, and he's sittin' with a slapper", but follows up revealing a less glamorous reality, "Then I see it's a pimp and his crack whore."

Several episodes from "city life" are described, suggesting things may not be what they seem: "When you look with your eyes everything seems nice, But if you look twice you can see it's all lies." However, Allen finds these sights "priceless", and asks (possibly sarcastically) "Oh why, oh why, would I wanna be anywhere else?"

"LDN" is composed in the key of F major (with its 5th interval played on bass guitar on the first beat). The song is written in cut time and moves at 100 beats per minute. It features a guitar using a tonic-dominant chord progression. It samples "Reggae Merengue" performed by Tommy McCook and the Supersonics, which is based on Nestor Montes's "Cógeme la caña".

== Music videos ==
There are three music videos made for "LDN", the first being a low-budget affair to promote the original vinyl release, the second to promote the re-release, and a third as a Japan exclusive to accompany the Japanese release of "Alfie".

The first video, directed by Ben Jones, recorded in speed-up camera, follows Allen riding her bike through London. It depicts many positive aspects of London, showing her taking a friendly photograph with a police officer, greeting a passer-by, eating at an ice cream café and relaxing in the public park, seeing people playing and having fun. She then travels on the London Underground, getting off at Ladbroke Grove tube station, where she then rides the bike around the palace area (outside the gate) then through the streets.

The second video, directed by Nima Nourizadeh, who would later work with Allen again for the music videos for the follow-up single "Littlest Things" and the Mark Ronson collaboration "Oh My God" is produced to be more in line with the song's words, particularly "When you look with your eyes, everything seems nice, but if you look twice, you can see it's all lies". It opens with Allen in a record store called Tough Grade, which is a play on Rough Trade, a record shop in London at Talbot Road and Portobello Road. She asks the manager for an eclectic piece of music – "punky electronica...kind of grime...kind of like...new-wave grime...but kind of maybe like more broken beats, but kinda dubby broken beats...but a lil bit kind of soulful....but kind of drum'n'bassy, but kinda more broken drum'n'bass like more broken beats, but break beat kind of broken drum'n'bass. Kind of...Do you know what I mean?". The song playing in the background is Allen's track "Friend of Mine", taken from her debut album, "Alright, Still". Allen receives a phone call, from someone assumed to be her boyfriend, and arranges to meet him. She walks out of the shop and walks through the centre of London. While she walks through the street, she leaves a glowing trail of light behind her, in Technicolor-like hues, and the town's atmosphere looks pleasant, fun and happy – however, as Allen moves forward the "reality" kicks in, as the scenery behind the hue transforms in sharp contrast in what it had been before, portraying litter, homelessness and violent crime in London, and the technicolour is washed out – for example, a magician's wand becomes a rusted nail, three gold coins turn into dog feces and a red sweet on the ground becomes a still-smoking cigarette butt. The video ends with Allen receiving another phone call; her boyfriend has decided not to come. Angry and unhappy, she storms away, and the vivid colour disappears to reveal the duller, more depressing reality of her surroundings.

Amy Winehouse's ex-husband, Blake Fielder-Civil, features in the music video trying to sell flowers to Allen.

The third video is similar to the first, being filmed in high speed as Allen walks around Tokyo, greeting locals and signing copies of her album.

== Track listings ==
- UK CD1
1. "LDN" – 3:13
2. "Nan You're a Window Shopper" – 2:59
- UK CD2
1. "LDN" – 3:13
2. "Naïve" – 3:46
3. "LDN" (Warbox Original Cut dub) – 3:55
4. "LDN" (video) – 3:53
- Digital EP
1. "LDN" (acoustic live at Bush Hall) – 4:01
2. "LDN" (Wookie remix) – 3:13
3. "LDN" (Crack Whore riddim) – 5:14
4. "LDN" (Switch remix) – 6:17
5. "LDN" (Warbox Original Cut dub) – 3:54
- Digital download
1. "LDN" – 3:13
2. "Nan You're a Window Shopper" – 2:59
3. "Naive" – 3:46
4. "LDN" (acoustic live at Bush Hall) – 3:17
- 7-inch vinyl
1. "LDN" – 3:13
2. "Nan You're a Window Shopper" – 2:59
- 7-inch vinyl – limited edition
1. "LDN" – 3:13
2. "Knock 'Em Out" – 2:54

== Charts ==
=== Weekly charts ===
Chart (2006–2007)	Peak position
Australia (ARIA)	39
Belgium (Ultratip Bubbling Under Flanders)	2
Belgium (Ultratip Bubbling Under Wallonia)	9
CIS Airplay (TopHit)	84
Czech Republic Airplay (ČNS IFPI)	44
Ireland (IRMA)	21
New Zealand (Recorded Music NZ)	23
Russia Airplay (TopHit)	85
Scotland Singles (Official Charts)	10
Slovakia Airplay (ČNS IFPI)	16
Switzerland (Schweizer Hitparade)	88
Ukraine Airplay (TopHit)	101
UK Singles (Official Charts)	6

=== Year-end charts ===
Chart (2006)	Position
UK Singles (OCC)	115

== Certifications ==
Region	Certification	Certified units/sales
New Zealand (RMNZ)	Platinum	30,000^{‡}
United Kingdom (BPI)	Platinum	600,000^{‡}
^{‡} Sales+streaming figures based on certification alone.

== Release history ==
Release dates and formats for "LDN"
Region	Date	Format(s)	Label(s)	Ref.
United Kingdom	25 September 2006	CD; maxi CD	Parlophone; Regal	
Germany	20 October 2006	Maxi CD	EMI	
United States	11 September 2007	Contemporary hit radio	Capitol	
