= Oh My God (Kaiser Chiefs song) =

2004 single by Kaiser Chiefs

Single by Kaiser Chiefs

from the album Employment
- B-side: "Born to Be a Dancer", "Caroline, Yes" (2004); "Brightest Star", "Think About You (And I Like It)" (2005)
- Released: 17 May 2004
- Genre: Alternative rock
- Length: 3:43 (original); 3:35 (reissue)
- Label: Drowned in Sound; B-Unique (re-issue)
- Songwriters: Ricky Wilson; Andrew White; Simon Rix; Nick Baines; Nick Hodgson
- Producers: Nick Hodgson (original); Stephen Street (re-issue)

Kaiser Chiefs singles chronology
"Hessles" (2002)	"Oh My God" (2004)	"I Predict a Riot" (2004)
"I Predict a Riot" (2004)	"Oh My God" (2005)	"Everyday I Love You Less and Less" (2005)

Music videos
- "Oh My God" (Version 1) on YouTube; "Oh My God" (Version 2) on YouTube

"Oh My God" is a song by English indie rock band Kaiser Chiefs. It was initially released by the Drowned in Sound label on 17 May 2004 as their first major label and fourth overall single, reaching number 66 on the UK Singles Chart, their first under the Kaiser Chiefs moniker after releasing a studio album on the now-defunct Mantra Recordings label and three singles in promotion as Parva between 2001 and 2002 and the album in 2003, all of which failed to chart, where the band was dropped after Beggars Banquet Records subsequently closed the label.

"Oh My God" was re-released on 21 February 2005, two weeks before the release of their second overall album, Employment. This time, it became their breakout single, peaking at number six on the UK Singles Chart, which earned the band their first top-10 hit as well as their highest-charting single at the time until it was succeeded by UK chart-topper "Ruby" in 2007.

The original single release, now a rarity due to its limited run of 500 copies, features artwork by frontman Ricky Wilson, and its B-sides were earlier versions of "Born to Be a Dancer" and "Caroline, Yes", both of which would also appear on Employment.

== Background ==
Singer Ricky Wilson said, "The verses are about the fact that we've been playing together for such a long time and people think, 'What's he doing? He's still trying to make a career out of music? It'll never work. One in a million people do it.' But we still had the opinion that we were five of the people in a million, so we carried on."

Dorian Lynskey of The Guardian wrote that the Kaiser Chiefs had been labeled as has-beens by 2003-2004, and they were desperate to build a fanbase to impress record labels: "The need to make an impression while bottom of the bill in a tiny venue explains all the ohhhhhhs and nanananas and oft-repeated choruses that set up shop in the listener's brain after the first listen."

The band's now-former drummer Nick Hodgson revealed in a 2023 TikTok video that Wilson had written all the verses, in addition to revealing draft lyrics and a 2003 demo of the song he made.

== Music videos ==
Two music videos were released for "Oh My God": one for its initial 2004 release and one for its 2005 reissue, both directed by Charlie Paul, in between having also worked with the Kaiser Chiefs for the original music video for their follow-up single "I Predict a Riot".

The first video for "Oh My God", in promotion of its original 2004 release, with 3D Animations by the English animation company Unanico Studios, depicts 3D avatars of the Kaiser Chiefs traveling on a ferry in a sea where they encounter various objects floating within it, including a chair, a Publicity stunt with the band's original logo, a coffee cup with Brown eyeballs, and a Tyrannosaurus rex, before a swarm of butterflies fly towards them, causing hardness to see for the band members, causing the ferry to spin and teleport into the sky as the song reaches its chorus. After this ends, the ferry lands back on the water and the band members regain control, arriving in a snowy, Arctic area where they encounter a Pac-Man-like character, in reference to the lyric "Come back stronger than a powered-up Pac-Man", before the ferry teleports to the sky again, with the band then arriving in Outer space, followed by drummer Nick Hodgson's avatar miming the chorus, before fading out and ending.

The second, more widely-circulated video for "Oh My God", in promotion of the 2005 reissue, depicts the Kaiser Chiefs miming to the song with toy instruments in an abandoned toy store, intercut with footage of the band performing the song in a room with their actual instruments, an Arctic iceberg, setting up a communication device and trying to stay warm, hanging out with a harem in a Bedouin tent, visiting a vintage library in Paris, and a martial arts retreat, before line animations overlay the footage in the final scenes of the video.

== Live performances ==
Since its release, the song has remained a fixture at the band's shows, including their opening set at Live 8 in Philadelphia in July 2005 (alongside "I Predict a Riot" and "Everyday I Love You Less and Less"), and their sold-out homecoming gig at Elland Road in 2008, among others.

== Track listings ==
=== Initial release ===
All of these tracks are different, earlier versions of the album editions.

1. "Oh My God"
2. "Born to Be a Dancer"
3. "Caroline, Yes"

=== Re-issue ===
7-inch (limited-edition white vinyl)

1. "Oh My God"
2. "Brightest Star"

CD

1. "Oh My God"
2. "Think About You (And I Like It)"

Mexican CD

1. "Oh My God"
2. "Hard Times Send Me"
3. "Born to Be a Dancer" (demo)
4. "Oh My God" (enhanced video)

== Charts ==
=== Weekly charts ===
Chart (2004)	Peak position
Scottish Singles Sales (Official Charts)	74
UK Singles (Official Charts)	66
UK Indie (Official Charts)	7

Chart (2005)	Peak position
Ireland (IRMA)	27
Netherlands (Single Top 100)	82
Scottish Singles Sales (Official Charts)	5
UK Singles (Official Charts)	6
UK Indie (Official Charts)	1

=== Year-end charts ===
Chart (2005)	Position
UK Singles (OCC)	108

== Certifications ==
Region	Certification	Certified units/sales
United Kingdom (BPI)	Silver	200,000^{‡}
^{‡} Sales+streaming figures based on certification alone.

== Release history ==
Region	Date	Format(s)	Label(s)	Ref.
United Kingdom	17 May 2004	CD	Drowned in Sound	
United Kingdom (re-release)	21 February 2005	7-inch vinyl; CD	B-Unique	
United States	13 June 2005	Alternative radio	Universal	

== Mark Ronson version ==
"Oh My God"

Single by Mark Ronson featuring Lily Allen

from the album Version
- B-side: "Pistol of Fire"
- Released: 16 July 2007
- Genre: Pop
- Length: 3:35
- Label: Columbia
- Songwriters: Ricky Wilson; Andrew White; Simon Rix; Nick Baines; Nick Hodgson
- Producer: Mark Ronson

Mark Ronson singles chronology
"Stop Me" (2007)	"Oh My God" (2007)	"Valerie" (2007)

Lily Allen singles chronology
"Alfie" (2007)	"Oh My God" (2007)	"Drivin' Me Wild" (2007)

Music video
- "Oh My God" on YouTube

In 2006, "Oh My God" was covered by singer-songwriter Lily Allen on her second mixtape. She later re-recorded the track with musician, disc jockey, and record producer Mark Ronson (having previously co-produced her debut album Alright, Still the year prior and subsequently returned to co-produce her fourth studio album No Shame in 2018) for his second studio album, Version (2007). This version was released as the second single from the album on 16 July 2007. The single was a success, reaching number eight on the UK Singles Chart.

Ronson later went on to co-produce the Kaiser Chiefs' 2008 studio album Off with Their Heads, while Allen, alongside members of NYPC, would perform backing vocals on its lead single "Never Miss a Beat", a track on the aforementioned album that Ronson co-produced alongside Eliot James. Ronson also played Agogô bells on the Off with Their Heads track "Addicted to Drugs". Allen also appeared as a backing vocalist on the Off with Their Heads track "Always Happens Like That", also produced by Ronson and James. The Kaiser Chiefs' then-drummer Nick Hodgson would also go on to co-write two tracks on Ronson's 2010 album Record Collection, including its lead single "Bang Bang Bang" and its title track (which the band themselves would later cover on Australian radio station Triple J's Like a Version segment the following year, not to be confused with their subsequent 2019 single of the same name), the former of which Hodgson also performed backing vocals on. Hodgson, in addition, has also co-written the 2010 Duran Duran deep cut "Too Bad You're So Beautiful" (from the physical edition of their thirteenth studio album All You Need Is Now) alongside the pop rock band themselves and Dominic Brown, which Duran Duran co-produced with Ronson.

The single is backed by a cover of the Kings of Leon deep cut "Pistol of Fire" from their 2004 studio album Aha Shake Heartbreak, featuring vocals by singer D. Smith, which also appears as one of three bonus tracks on the digital deluxe edition of Version. Ronson later remixed the Kings of Leon's original version of "Pistol of Fire" as the B-side to their 2009 single "Revelry".

=== Music video ===
The music video for Ronson and Allen's version was directed by Nima Nourizadeh (having previously worked with Allen on her second music video for "LDN" and the video for "Littlest Things", the latter track co-written and produced by Ronson), and features a toon version of Allen (designed by French illustrator Fafi, a reference to Jessica Rabbit in the film Who Framed Roger Rabbit) performing the song and flirting in the Ink and Paint Club.

The Kaiser Chiefs themselves make a cameo. Australian singer-songwriter and frequent collaborator of Ronson's, Daniel Merriweather, who appears on Ronson's previous single "Stop Me" (and appears in the accompanying video), also has a cameo in this video. Of notice is that, in the video, "Lily Allen" is the only toon present. Most of the toons that worked at the club (the octopus bartender, the penguin waiters, Bongo the Gorilla and Betty Boop) have been replaced by real people.

The video was completed after three weeks of filming. In a 2007 interview with Sound Generator, Nourizadeh said of the video:

My recent video for Mark Ronson and Lily Allen's cover of 'Oh My God' is unique compared to anything else I’ve made, but that’s why I love it. I knew this was a big pop song but the fact that I was asked to pitch on it meant they were into me doing something different. Because I was into the song I was excited about the video, and it had this cool vibe where lots of interesting people were involved. The funny thing is I’d met the original manager of the Kaiser Chiefs years ago, before the band were signed, and we talked about doing a video for that song which I listened to on a demo tape and loved. Then they got signed and quickly blew up. I found it quite funny to finally make a video for the song years later, even though it was the cover version! Despite my experience with animation being slight - let alone combining it with live action - I proposed the idea knowing it was really right for the song. It just felt like the timing was right for this type of video again and the fact that Lily was unavailable for the video shoot made the idea work on a practical level too. We approached French illustrator Fafi to help design the Lily character based on her Fafinette characters, and she was really excited to be involved…everyone was happy! However there were so many different aspects to this production. I think the hardest part was working with such a big team of animators, I even found the shoot to be less stressful in comparison. Initially I found it frustrating, extremely exhausting and strenuous as I’m normally incredibly involved and hands on with everything I do. But for the animation department everything had to be communicated so precisely and at times it felt like it was more of a test of my people skills than anything else. How do you tell someone you don’t like the shot they’ve been working on for 2 days? It was pretty difficult to find the right approach, because I wanted to keep everyones spirits up and continuously excited about the project. I'd made a video for the Hot Chip song ‘Colours’ which was entirely CGI (4D facial capture technology) the previous year, and I swore I’d never do another animation video, but here I was doing another! It was incredibly rewarding but I think that maybe one animation video a year is enough for me.

— Nima Nourizadeh on directing the video

=== Live performances ===
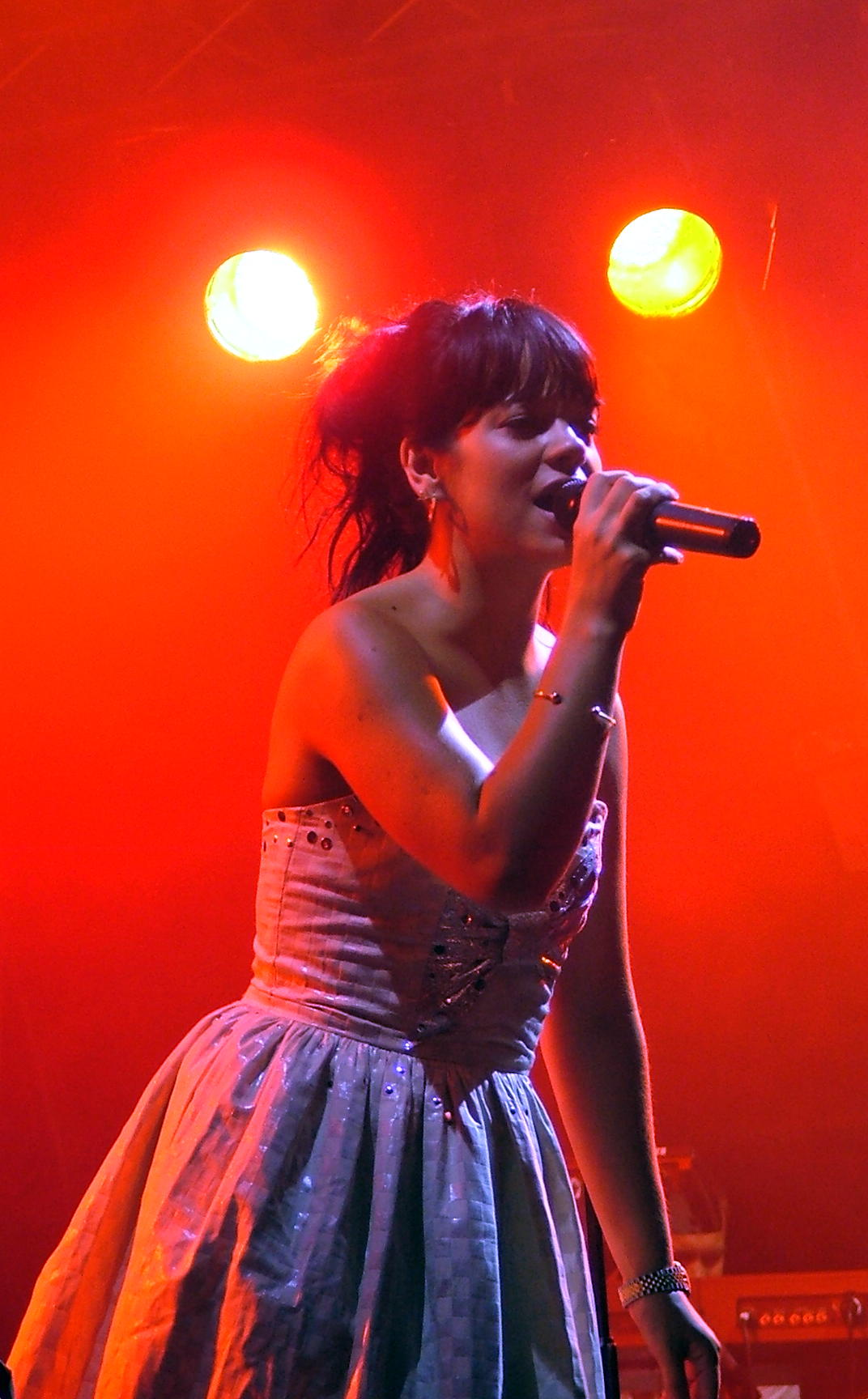
Allen performing at Somerset House on the day of the song's release as a single

When Ronson performed at the BBC Electric Proms in 2007, Allen had been the intended singer of the song but cancelled at the last minute. Rather than not perform the song, Ricky Wilson, who was performing with the Kaiser Chiefs the next day, stepped in. Ronson and Wilson performed the song again on the last Friday Night with Jonathan Ross of 2007, which also featured Candie Payne. Ronson's band, Mark Ronson & The Business Intl continued to play the song, including in 2011, at Positivus Festival, Latvia, with singer-songwriter Rose Elinor Dougall taking Allen's place. This performance was more akin to the original.

=== Track listings ===
UK CD single

1. "Oh My God" (radio edit)
2. "Oh My God" (the clean Super Busdown remix)
3. "Oh My God" (instrumental)
4. "Pistol of Fire" (featuring D. Smith)

10-inch vinyl

1. "Oh My God" (radio edit)
2. "Oh My God" (the dirty Super Busdown remix)

European CD single

1. "Oh My God" (radio edit)
2. "Oh My God" (instrumental)
3. "Oh My God" (Christopher Lake mix)
4. "Oh My God" (Emperor Machine extended vocal mix)
5. "Oh My God" (the clean Super Busdown remix)
6. "Oh My God" (the dirty Super Busdown remix)

Digital download

1. "Oh My God" (radio edit)
2. "Oh My God" (instrumental)
3. "Oh My God" (the clean Super Busdown remix)
4. "Oh My God" (the dirty Super Busdown remix)
5. "Oh My God" (Christopher Lake mix)
6. "Oh My God" (Emperor Machine ext vocal mix)
7. "Pistol of Fire" (featuring D. Smith)

=== Charts ===
==== Weekly charts ====
Chart (2007)	Peak position
Australia (ARIA)	72
Belgium (Ultratip Bubbling Under Flanders)	19
Ireland (IRMA)	21
Scottish Singles Sales (Official Charts)	14
UK Singles (Official Charts)	8
UK Dance (Official Charts)	4

==== Year-end charts ====
Chart (2007)	Position
UK Singles (OCC)	97

=== Certifications ===
Region	Certification	Certified units/sales
United Kingdom (BPI)	Silver	200,000^{‡}
^{‡} Sales+streaming figures based on certification alone.

=== Release history ===
Region	Date	Format	Label	Ref.
United Kingdom	16 July 2007	CD	Columbia	

== 2020 reworked edit ==
The band, influenced by the then-coronavirus pandemic, unveiled a reworked "Stay Home" edition with new, lockdown-inspired lyrics. The idea came about as a joke, when a fan of The Chris Moyles Show on Radio X texted in to suggest alternative lyrics, prompting Moyles to message Wilson with the idea. Wilson then rewrote the song, notably changing the chorus from "Oh, my God, I can't believe it, I've never been this far away from home" to "Oh, my God, I can't believe it, I've never spent this much time at home" and re-recorded it from home, on call with the other band members. It also mentions the Clap for Our Carers appreciation gesture. The song was posted on Twitter and uploaded to YouTube on 14 April 2020.
