= Time to Move On (album) =

Studio album by Billy Ocean
- Released: 1 March 1993
- Genre: R&B, pop rock
- Length: 55:24
- Label: Jive
- Producer: Steely & Clevie; Hula & K. Fingers; R. Kelly; Timmy Allen; Dorsey Robinson

Billy Ocean chronology
Greatest Hits (1989)	Time to Move On (1993)	Because I Love You (2009)

Time to Move On is the eighth studio album by Trinidadian-British singer Billy Ocean, which was released by Jive in 1993. It would be Ocean's last studio album until 2009's Because I Love You.

== Background ==
Following the release of Ocean's seventh studio album Tear Down These Walls in 1988, Ocean went on to take a four-year recording hiatus. In a 1993 interview on Live with Kelly and Ryan, Ocean explained: "My mother got ill, and eventually she died. Then after she died I sort of stopped and looked at my situation - my family. I have three kids and a wife, and for years I'd been writing and recording and touring, and I thought it's not fair. Something was missing, so I stopped for a while, recharged the battery, and had a chance to watch my kids grow up for a while, and get a bit of space. It was productive. I feel a lot more at ease and peace with myself. Success is a very confusing thing sometimes, because of the place it takes."

When he began to produce his next studio album, Ocean worked with a number of producers; Steely & Clevie, Hula & K. Fingers, R. Kelly, Timmy Allen and Dorsey Robinson. The album was recorded at Battery Studios in Chicago and the Hit Factory in New York City. Time to Move On saw Ocean exploring new musical styles, with a mixture of Caribbean-spiced dance numbers, romantic pop/R&B ballads, new-jack swing, and reggae. Additionally Ocean's own appearance changed, as he began to sport a dreadlocks hairstyle.

When released in 1993, Time to Move On failed to achieve the same level of commercial success Ocean had seen during the 1980s. The album failed to chart in the US or the UK. It reached No. 81 in the Netherlands. The leading single "Pressure" was the album's biggest success, reaching No. 55 in the UK, No. 44 in the Netherlands, and No. 39 in Belgium. The second single "Pick Up the Pieces (Put It Back)" failed to garner any charting action. The third and final single "Everything's So Different Without You" was the only one of the three singles to be released in the United States. It reached No. 91 on the Billboard Hot R&B/Hip-Hop Singles & Tracks.

As Ocean's last album for Jive, and his last of new material until 2009's Because I Love You, Ocean ended up taking a break from his musical career. In a 2009 interview with soulmusic.com, Ocean recalled: "Clive Calder [head of Jive Records] was going over to America, and I came across another transitional stage. I had fallen out with my manager, so all of the machinery that went into creating the hits wasn't there anymore. Hence, I didn't record for awhile. After Time to Move On, when Clive went to America, it wasn't the same with the people I had to work with over here. Instead of beating my head against a brick wall, I thought, 'Maybe I'll just spend some time with my family'. Of course, it sort of drifted into nearly 15 years, because, you know, time flies!"

== Critical reception ==
Professional ratings
Review scores
Source	Rating
AllMusic	3/5 stars

Justin Kantor of AllMusic stated: "This album found Ocean offering strong melodies, lyrics, and vocals once again, yet on occasion also showed him falling victim to current production trends. This set isn't as consistently unforgettable as earlier works like Love Zone or Nights, but is still considerably strong."

== Track listing ==
Time to Move On track listing
No.	Title	Writer(s)	Length
1.	"Pick Up the Pieces (Put It Back)"	Billy Ocean, C. Browne, W. Johnson	4:33
2.	"Pressure"	Ocean, Browne, Johnson	4:42
3.	"Upside Down"	Ocean, Hula, K. Fingers	4:04
4.	"Everyday Sunshine"	Ocean, Browne, Johnson	5:12
5.	"Stand Up Stand Up"	Ocean, Hula, Fingers	3:55
6.	"The World Wants to Dance"	Ocean, Hula, Fingers	4:00
7.	"Time to Move On"	Ocean, Timmy Allen	4:46
8.	"Rose"	Ocean, R. Kelly	5:24
9.	"Can We Go 'Round Again?"	Ocean, Kelly	5:04
10.	"Everything's So Different Without You"	Ocean, Kelly	4:19
11.	"I'll Be There for You"	Ocean, Hula, Fingers	4:28
12.	"On Your Knees"	Ocean	4:52

1993 Japanese CD bonus track
No.	Title	Length
11.	"Pressure" (UK 7" edit)

== Personnel ==
Musicians

- Billy Ocean – lead and backing vocals
- Wycliffe "Steely" Johnson – keyboards (1, 2, 4, 12)
- Hula & K. Fingers – all instruments (3, 5, 11), other instruments (6), additional backing vocals (6), horns (12)
- Timmy Allen – all instruments (7)
- Dorsey "Rob" Robinson – keyboards (8)
- R. Kelly – keyboards (9, 10)
- Keith Henderson – programming (9)
- Peter Mokran – programming (9, 10), guitars (9, 10), bass (10)
- Dalton Browne – lead guitar (2, 12)
- Danny Browne – lead guitar (2), rhythm guitar (2, 12)
- Ron Simpson – guitars (6)
- Vincent Henry – guitars (8)
- Tinker Barfield – bass (8)
- Clevie Browne – drums (1, 2, 4, 12), percussion (1, 2, 4, 12)
- Ivan Hampton – drums (8)
- Stephen George – percussion (6)
- Steve Kroon – percussion (8)
- Arthur Porter – saxophone (9)
- Roz Davis – additional backing vocals (3, 5)
- Dawn Green – additional backing vocals (3, 5)
- Joyce Faison – additional backing vocals (9)
- Cheryl Wilson – additional backing vocals (9)

Production

- Steely & Clevie – producers (1, 2, 4, 12)
- Hula & K. Fingers – producers (3, 4, 11)
- Timmy Allen – producer (7)
- Dorsey "Rob" Robinson – producer (8)
- R. Kelly – producer (9, 10)
- Pete Christensen, Eric Gast, Stephen George, Nigel Green, Gerard Julien, Peter Mokran, Anthony Saunders, Martin Stebbing, Carl Toppin, Chris Trevett and Collin "Bulby" York – engineers
- Pete Christensen, Leroy "Mr. Lee" Haggard, Gerard Julien, Adam Kudzin, Lynford "Fatta" Marshall, Chad Pearson, Martin Stebbing, Stefon Taylor and Andy Wold – assistant engineers
- Nigel Green – mix engineer (1, 4, 8)
- Chris Trevett – mix engineer (2, 3, 5, 7, 9–12)
- Stephen George – mix engineer (6), remixing (6), editing (6)
- Leroy "Mr. Lee" Haggard – remixing (6), editing (6)
- Tom Coyne – mastering
- Paul Cox – photography
- ZombArt: JK – design

== Charts ==
Chart performance for Time to Move On
Chart (1993)	Peak position
Dutch Albums Chart	81
