= Alfie (Lily Allen song) =

2007 single by Lily Allen

Single by Lily Allen

from the album Alright, Still
- A-side: "Shame for You"
- Released: 5 March 2007
- Length: 2:46
- Label: Regal; Festival; Warner Bros.
- Songwriters: Lily Allen; Greg Kurstin
- Producer: Greg Kurstin

Lily Allen singles chronology
"Littlest Things" (2006)	"Shame for You" / "Alfie" (2007)	"Oh My God" (2007)

Music video
- "Alfie" on YouTube

"Alfie" is a song by British singer-songwriter Lily Allen from her debut studio album, Alright, Still (2006). Written by Allen and Greg Kurstin, the song was released as the fourth and final single from the album, on 5 March 2007, by Regal Recordings. In the United Kingdom, it was marketed as a double A-side single, along with "Shame for You". While the melody incorporates a sample of Sandie Shaw's "Puppet on a String", the lyrics directly describe Allen's real life younger brother (aged 20 at the time of the single's release), actor Alfie Allen, criticising him for laziness.

Contemporary critics gave the song mixed reviews, with some complimenting the production, while others considered it fell flat as the album's last song. The single peaked inside the top 20 of the charts in New Zealand and on the UK Singles Chart, where it became her third single to do so. The accompanying music video portrayed Allen's brother as a puppet while the storyline follows the lyrical meaning of the song. The song was performed live by Allen during her 2007 concert tour, as part of the encore.

== Background ==
The song is set in common time and has a tempo of 120 beats per minute. While it is played in the key of C major and has backing piano and guitar sounds, "Alfie" also uses a sample from Sandie Shaw's 1967 Eurovision Song Contest winning song "Puppet on a String". In an interview with Pitchfork Media, Allen stated that the song's lyrics describe her younger brother, Alfie Allen. She further explained:

When I wrote "Alfie", nobody really knew who I was. At first he was really upset about it, because he thought that I was just pointing out all of his bad points and attacking him. I thought it was really flattering [Laughs]. I thought he'd be really, really happy because it proved to him how much I loved him, that I care about him, and I want him to do something with his life. I suppose his paranoia — induced by smoking so much weed — made him think, "Why are you trying to be mean?"

In the song, she tries to persuade him to emerge from his room and stop wasting his life away, while complaining that he is spending too much time stuck in his room smoking weed, watching television, and playing video games.

The cover of the single released in the United Kingdom is different from the EP one used in Japan, as it also shows "Shame for You" written on it. "Alfie" was performed live, as part of the setlist of Allen's 2007 concert tour.

== Critical and commercial reception ==
"Alfie"
A 27 second sample of "Alfie", in which Allen sings the chorus.

Rosie Swash from The Guardian described the song's sound as "fairground pomp". She then suggested that Allen has fused together a "uniquely acidic brand of pop", with the icing on the cake being "that brutally barbed tongue". Rob Webb from Drowned in Sound considered that "Alfie" rescued the lack of wit and imagination of some previous tracks on the album, while Blender reporter Jon Dolan thought that the "silly waltz-rap" of the song is an example at how Allen "casually and wittily blurs the line between fan and friend". Sal Cinquemani from Slant Magazine praised the production of "Alfie", as well as "Shame for You", with "plenty of catchy melodies and clever samples", but claimed that Allen lacks charisma. Heather Phares of Allmusic gave a negative review for the song, claiming it "falls especially flat as the album's final song", with the album losing steam at the end, and NME's Priya Elan considered that if "the pop dreams get slightly tarnished by the graffiti put-downs of 'Not Big' and 'Alfie', then that's not too worrying, as with a personality this size, this isn’t the last time you’ll be hearing from [Allen]". It was considered by reviewer Ronan Hunt-Murphy from Two Way Monologues that the song could be used for a children's TV show, if the swearing and drug references were cut.

The single failed to achieve commercial success. It debuted at 44 and peaked inside the top 20 of the UK Singles Chart, at number 15 for only one week, where it charted as the double A-sided single, "Alfie"/"Shame for You". Other moderate chart peaks include Ireland, at 31, and New Zealand at 15. In Japan, "Alfie" was only released as an extended play, made exclusively for that country. In Europe, it reached position 55 on the Eurochart Hot 100 Singles compiled by Billboard.

== Music video ==
Alfie trying to get back the water pipe from Allen in the music video for "Alfie".

The music video was directed by Sarah Chatfield, who wanted to do a Tom and Jerry-like video, where the human character is cut off at the waist. Hence Allen was not going to be part of it originally. However, she did appear on the video. The singer declared on her official blog that,

I did a video shoot for the next single, which is Alfie, and that was quite a lot of fun, Alfie was played by a puppet and the whole thing looks like an episode of a mixture Tom and Jerry and Roger Rabbit, you'll understand when you see it. The whole day was a pleasurable experience [...]

The video starts off with an opening title parodying Looney Tunes and shows Allen in the kitchen preparing a cup of tea, while Alfie, impersonated by a puppet, smokes in his miniature bedroom, watching television. The singer enters the room and takes away his bong, as he unsuccessfully tries to get it back. Next, Allen irons his tuxedo and marks a job announcement called "The Puppet Show" in the newspaper, as the lyric "You need to get a job because the bills need to get paid" is sung. Meanwhile, Alfie is in his bed, staring at a magazine in which there are undressed dolls, titled "Roxy & Babs get it on!" and proceeds to masturbate. Allen walks in on him with the newspaper and suit as he does so, but immediately exits out of embarrassment. With the start of the bridge, puppet birds sing outside the home, while Alfie sneaks out of his room and tries to get beer out of the refrigerator, but is ultimately caught by Allen. She then takes off his "stupid fitted cap", as he scrawls a picture of her, which is also the cover of "Littlest Things". The final scene happens at night, in the kitchen, where Allen is lying on the floor, watching her brother dance. After the last lyrics, "Please don't despair, my dear, mon frère" is sung, he punches her and the video ends.

There is also an alternate version, where the words "weed", "THC" and "twat" are blanked, the bong is replaced by a joystick, Alfie does not smoke, and, when Allen walks in on him masturbating, there is a big "censored" sign. The video won "Best Pop Video" and "Best New Director" at the CADs Music Vision Awards in June 2007, and nominated at the 2007 Q Awards for "Best Video", but lost to "Ruby" by Kaiser Chiefs.

== Track listing and formats ==
- CD Single
1. "Alfie"
2. "Shame for You"
- 7" Vinyl
1. "Alfie" (explicit)
2. "Shame for You"
- Digital download
1. "Alfie" (explicit)
2. "Alfie" (CSS remix)
3. "Alfie" (live at Bush Hall)
4. "Shame for You"
5. "Shame for You" (live at Bush Hall)
- Japanese EP
1. "Alfie"
2. "Smile"
3. "Everybody's Changing"
4. "Nan You're a Window Shopper"
5. "Alfie" (CSS remix)
6. "Smile" (Version Revisited) (Mark Ronson remix)
7. "Alfie" (banned version) (CD extra music video)
8. "LDN" (TYO version) (CD extra music video)
9. "Littlest Things" (CD extra music video)

== Credits and personnel ==
- Lead vocals — Lily Allen
- Written by — Lily Allen and Greg Kurstin
- Produced by — Greg Kurstin
- Mastered by — Tim Burrell, Tim Debney
- Audio mixing — Greg Kurstin

== Charts ==
Chart (2007)	Peak position
Europe (Eurochart Hot 100)	55
Ireland (IRMA)	31
New Zealand (Recorded Music NZ)	15
UK Singles (OCC)^{[B]}	15

Notes:

- A Charted as the "Alfie" extended play.
- B Charted as the double A-sided single "Alfie"/"Shame for You".

== Certifications ==
Certifications for "Alfie/Shame For You"
Region	Certification	Certified units/sales
United Kingdom (BPI)	Silver	200,000^{‡}
^{‡} Sales+streaming figures based on certification alone.
