= Employment (album) =

Studio album by Kaiser Chiefs
- Released: 7 March 2005
- Recorded: Summer–December 2004
- Studios: Chapel Studios, Lincoln
- Genres: Alternative rock: indie rock; post-punk revival; art punk
- Length: 44:12 (40:42 without bonus track)
- Label: B-Unique
- Producers: Stephen Street; Stephen Harris

Kaiser Chiefs chronology
Lap of Honour (2005)	Employment (2005)	Enjoyment (2005)

Singles from Employment
- 1. "Oh My God" Released: 17 May 2004; 2. "I Predict a Riot" Released: 5 November 2004; 3. "Everyday I Love You Less and Less" Released: 16 May 2005; 4. "Modern Way" Released: 7 November 2005; 5. "You Can Have It All" Released: 25 December 2005

Employment is the debut studio album by English indie rock band Kaiser Chiefs, released in March 2005 on B-Unique Records. Employment takes its inspirations from the Britpop and new wave movements, 1970s-era punk rock and Beach Boys-esque West Coast music.

The album originally charted at number three in the UK Albums Chart on 13 March 2005, but charted at number two almost a year after its release, due to the band's success at the Brit Awards. Employment went on to become the fourth best-selling album in the United Kingdom that year.

Kaiser Chiefs issued a twentieth anniversary edition in July 2025. Employment 20 (China Anniversary Edition) included revised cover artwork and forty additional tracks of materials related to the production and release of the album.

== Background ==
It was the Kaiser Chiefs themselves that chose to work with producer Stephen Street. According to Street he had been introduced to Nick Hodgson after an Ordinary Boys gig in which Kaiser Chiefs were the support act. Hodgson gave Street a demo CD and said that they would love to work with him. The band's new label B-Unique suggested they try a test session with Street. In mid-August 2004 they visited the producer at a basement studio space at Olympic Studios he was renting with engineer Cenzo Townsend and recorded "I Predict a Riot".

According to manager James Sandom in an interview with HitQuarters, the album was recorded in a rush because the band were under very tight time constraints and touring at the time. As a result, they did not have enough time to get to know Stephen Street and relax in his company. The motorbike that appears at the beginning of "Saturday Night" is owned and 'played' by Graham Coxon. The sleeve notes read "Graham Coxon's motorbike, (1935 Kaiser 'Chief' 750cc Manx TT Works Racer) appears courtesy of Transcopic Records". "Caroline, Yes" is named in reference to The Beach Boys' song "Caroline, No". The track's original working title was called "Hail to the Chief", according to Kaiser Chiefs' book A Record of Employment.

A DVD titled Enjoyment, featuring music videos and live performances of the album's songs, was also released.

== Reception ==
Professional ratings
Aggregate scores
Source	Rating
Metacritic	78/100
Review scores
Source	Rating
AllMusic	4/5 stars
Entertainment Weekly	B
The Guardian	4/5 stars
Los Angeles Times	3/4 stars
Mojo	4/5 stars
Pitchfork	6.7/10
Q	3/5 stars
Rolling Stone	4/5 stars
Spin	B+
Uncut	4/5 stars

On Metacritic the album has a weighted average score of 78% based on reviews from 27 critics, indicating "Generally favorable reviews".

- Rolling Stone (p. 76) - 4 stars out of 5 - "Danceable art-punk gems full of guitar fuzz, na-na-na choruses and boyish energy..."
- Spin (p. 62) - Ranked #19 in Spin's "40 Best Albums of 2005" - "A cohesive debut that recalls the glory days of Britpop and second-wave punk."
- Spin (p. 102) - "The quintet bash through nervy, synth-stoked guitar pop....With a dedication to daffy English humour and bouncy music-hall folderol that creates the illusion of cultural import." - Grade: B+
- Entertainment Weekly (No. 814, p. 64) - "The Leeds five have polished their ability to craft catchy songs so well that any attempt at sincere artistry is subverted." - Grade: B.
- Uncut (p. 105) - 4 stars out of 5 - "Employment is a gem...In the smart-pop steeplechase, Hot Hot Heat have got serious competition."
- Yahoo Music - "finally, a worthy successor to Blur." - 8 out of 10
- Mojo (p. 64) - Ranked #50 in Mojo's "The 50 Best Albums of 2005" - "Ricky Wilson's cheeky chappies proved the power of knowing daftness."
- Mojo (p. 109) - 4 stars out of 5 - "Employing ill-fitting suits, tongue-in-cheek lyricism and a jerky guitar attack that smelts the classic rock canon into an infectious, head-spinning punch."
- AllMusic - 4 stars out of 5 - "Employment is an uneven but still very promising debut that suggests that one day the Kaiser Chiefs will pull off something even more ambitious."
- Pitchfork rated it 6.7 out of 10
- Steve Hochman of the Los Angeles Times rated it 3 stars out of 5.

== Track listing ==
All tracks are written by Ricky Wilson, Andrew White, Simon Rix, Nick Baines, and Nick Hodgson.

No.	Title	Length
1.	"Everyday I Love You Less and Less"	3:37
2.	"I Predict a Riot"	3:53
3.	"Modern Way"	4:03
4.	"Na Na Na Na Naa"	3:01
5.	"You Can Have It All"	4:35
6.	"Oh My God"	3:35
7.	"Born to Be a Dancer"	3:30
8.	"Saturday Night"	3:27
9.	"What Did I Ever Give You?"	4:09
10.	"Time Honoured Tradition"	2:45
11.	"Caroline, Yes"	4:13
12.	"Team Mate" (not included on some editions)	3:24

Japanese edition bonus tracks
No.	Title	Length
13.	"Take My Temperature"	2:44
14.	"Wrecking Ball"	3:50

Limited edition bonus disc
No.	Title	Length
1.	"Hard Times Send Me" (live)	2:47
2.	"Modern Way" (live)	3:55
3.	"I Predict a Riot" (live)	4:01
4.	"Time Honoured Tradition" (live)	3:13
5.	"Na Na Na Na Naa" (live)	3:09
6.	"Oh My God" (live)	3:40

China Anniversary Edition
No.	Title	Length
13.	"Take My Temperature" (Japanese Bonus Track / "I Predict a Riot" B-side)	2:43

China Anniversary Edition Part 2
No.	Title	Length
1.	"Wrecking Ball" (I Predict a Riot B-Side)	3:51
2.	"Brightest Star" (Oh My God Re-issue B-side)	2:29
3.	"Not Surprised" (Everyday I Love You Less and Less Maxi B-Side)	3:24
4.	"Think About You (And I Like It)" (Oh My God Re-issue B-side)	4:47
5.	"Hard Times Send Me" ("Oh My God" Re-issue B-side maxi-CD single)	2:39
6.	"Sink That Ship" ("I Predict a Riot"/"Sink that Ship" B-side)	2:33
7.	"Less Is More" (I Predict a Riot/Sink That Ship B-Side)	2:52
8.	"The Letter Song" (Everyday I Love You Less and Less B-side)	1:29
9.	"Seventeen Cups" (Everyday I Love You Less and Less Maxi B-Side)	3:35
10.	"It Ain't Easy (Demo)" (Modern Way B-Side)	2:25
11.	"Run Again" (Modern Way B-Side)	2:41
12.	"People Need Light" (Modern Way B-Side)	3:06
13.	"Moon" (Modern Way B-Side)	2:51
14.	"Another Number" (Everyday I Love You Less and Less B-Side)	2:52
15.	"I Heard It Through The Grapevine" (Help: A Day in the Life Comp Track)	4:52

== Personnel ==
=== Kaiser Chiefs ===
- Ricky Wilson – lead vocals
- Andrew White – guitar, backing vocals
- Simon Rix – bass, backing vocals
- Nick Baines – keyboards, piano, synthesiser, organ
- Nick Hodgson – drums, backing vocals

=== Technical personnel ===
- Stephen Street – production
- Stephen Harris – production

== Charts ==
=== Weekly charts ===
Chart (2005–2006)	Peak position
Australian Albums (ARIA)	60
Belgian Albums (Ultratop Flanders)	19
Belgian Albums (Ultratop Wallonia)	88
Canadian Albums (Nielsen SoundScan)	85
Dutch Albums (Album Top 100)	12
French Albums (SNEP)	133
German Albums (Offizielle Top 100)	55
Irish Albums (IRMA)	2
Scottish Albums (Official Charts)	2
Spanish Albums (Promusicae)	97
Swedish Albums (Sverigetopplistan)	40
UK Albums (Official Charts)	2
UK Album Downloads (Official Charts)	21
UK Independent Albums (Official Charts)	1
UK Jazz & Blues Albums (Official Charts)	10
UK R&B Albums (Official Charts)	5
US Billboard 200	86

=== Year-end charts ===
Chart (2005)	Position
Belgian Albums (Ultratop Flanders)	75
European Albums (Billboard)	26
Irish Albums (IRMA)	18
UK Albums (OCC)	4

Chart (2006)	Position
European Albums (Billboard)	57
UK Albums (OCC)	32

Chart (2007)	Position
UK Albums (OCC)	147

Chart (2008)	Position
UK Albums (OCC)	191

=== Decade-end charts ===
Chart (2000–09)	Position
UK Albums (OCC)	23

== Certifications ==
Region	Certification	Certified units/sales
Australia (ARIA)	Gold	35,000^{^}
Belgium (BRMA)	Gold	25,000^{*}
Denmark (IFPI Danmark)	Gold	20,000^{^}
Greece (IFPI Greece)	Gold	10,000^{^}
Ireland (IRMA)	3× Platinum	45,000^{^}
Netherlands (NVPI)	Gold	40,000^{^}
United Kingdom (BPI)	7× Platinum	2,100,000^{‡}
Summaries
Europe (IFPI)	2× Platinum	2,000,000^{*}
^{*} Sales figures based on certification alone.^{^} Shipments figures based on certification alone.^{‡} Sales+streaming figures based on certification alone.

== See also ==
- List of best-selling albums of the 2000s (decade) in the United Kingdom
