= Alright, Still =

2006 studio album by Lily Allen

Studio album by Lily Allen
- Released: 13 July 2006
- Recorded: 2004–2006
- Studios: The Sample Factory (London) (Note: Tracks 1–3, 9 and 10); The Fish Market (London) (Note: Track 1); Allido (New York City) (Note: Track 8); Sarm West (London); 80 Hertz (Manchester) (Note: Track 9)
- Genres: Pop; reggae; R&B
- Length: 37:12
- Label: Regal
- Producers: Iyiola Babalola; Pablo Cook; Future Cut; Greg Kurstin; Darren Lewis; Blair MacKichan; Mark Ronson; TMS

Lily Allen chronology
Alright, Still (2006)	It's Not Me, It's You (2009)

Singles from Alright, Still
- 1. "Smile" Released: 3 July 2006; 2. "LDN" Released: 25 September 2006; 3. "Littlest Things" Released: 11 December 2006; 4. "Alfie" / "Shame for You" Released: 5 March 2007

Alright, Still is the debut studio album by English singer Lily Allen, released on 13 July 2006 by Regal Recordings. After being rejected by several record labels, Allen signed to London Records, who eventually lost interest in her, leading her to meet production duo Future Cut and sign to Regal Recordings. Recording for the album began in 2004, with sessions between Allen and Future Cut, and Allen's work garnered publicity on the internet as she posted demos to her MySpace account before all of her work were officially released. Allen later travelled to the United States to work with Greg Kurstin and Mark Ronson to complete the final half of the album in 2006.

Alright, Still is predominately a pop album, with songs heavily influenced by ska, reggae and hip hop. The lyrics are conversational and farcical, discussing past relationships with a dark sense of humour. Due to the instances of strong language in a majority of the songs, the album was released with a Parental Advisory warning, although the song "Friday Night" remained censored on all versions of the album.

Upon its release, Alright, Still received acclaim from the British music press, with international critics calling the record and Allen "original". It was commercially successful in the United Kingdom, where it debuted at number two on the UK Albums Chart and was later certified quadruple platinum. Alright, Still has sold over 2.5 million copies worldwide. The album earned a nomination for Best Alternative Music Album at the 50th Grammy Awards. It was promoted by the release of four singles, including the chart-topper "Smile" and the top-10 single "LDN".

== Background ==
When her family went to Ibiza on holiday, Allen told her mother that she was staying with friends but remained in Sant Antoni de Portmany instead. She earned money by working at a Plastic Fantastic record store and dealing ecstasy. Allen met her first manager, George Lamb, in Ibiza. She was rejected by several labels, which she attributed to her drinking and being the daughter of actor Keith Allen. She eventually used her father's connections to get signed to London Records in 2002. When the executive who had signed her left, the label lost interest and she left without releasing the folk songs that had been written for her, many of which were written by her father. She then studied horticulture to become a florist, but changed her mind and returned to music. Allen began writing songs, while her manager introduced her to production duo Future Cut in 2004. They worked in a small studio in the basement of an office building.

== Development ==
Allen's manager introduced her to production duo Future Cut in 2004. They worked in a small studio in the basement of a Manchester office building. In 2005, Allen was signed to Regal Recordings; the label gave her £25,000 to produce an album, though they were unable to provide much support for it due to their preoccupation with other releases such as Coldplay's X&Y and Gorillaz' Demon Days.

Allen created an account on MySpace and began posting demos in November 2005. The demos attracted thousands of listeners, and 500 limited edition 7" vinyl singles of one of the demos, a song titled "LDN", were rush-released and sold for as much as £40. Allen also produced two mixtapes titled My First Mixtape and My Second Mixtape to promote her work, including tracks by the band Creedence Clearwater Revival and rappers Dizzee Rascal and Ludacris. As she accumulated tens of thousands of MySpace friends, The Observer Music Monthly (OMM), a magazine published in The Observer, took interest. Few people outside of her label's A&R department had heard of Allen, so the label were slow in responding to publications who wanted to report about her.

In March 2006, OMM published an article about Allen's success through MySpace, and she received her first major mainstream coverage appearing in the magazine's cover story two months later. The popularity of her songs convinced her label to allow her more creative control over the album and to use some of the songs that she had written instead of attempting to work with mainstream producers. Allen found herself distracted by the publicity, so to focus on finishing the album, she travelled to the United States to work with producers Greg Kurstin and Mark Ronson. There, she was able to complete the second half of the album in approximately two weeks.

The album's title is used in a line from the second track, "Knock 'Em Out": "You look alright still, yeah what's your name?"

== Music and lyrics ==
"LDN"
The second song released as a single, featuring a ska sample of "Reggae Merengue".

In her songs, Allen develops various personas. She stated that she tried to "write about stuff that happens to people from all different backgrounds". The lyrics are conversational, with a dark sense of humour. In many of the songs, one of Allen's personae disparages someone around her. In "Smile", "Not Big", and "Shame for You", she insults an ex-boyfriend. In "Knock 'Em Out", she mocks suitors at a bar, and Lily reprimands her brother Alfie on the song of the same name.

Joe Strummer, a close friend of Allen's father Keith, played mixtapes of Brazilian music and Jamaican reggae and ska when she was young. Allen stated that she had "always been into very black music" such as ska, reggae, and hip hop music. Since she did not know how to rap, she chose to use reggae as a point of reference when making Alright, Still. The album's music blends ska and reggae with pop melodies. Allen's melodies are influenced by the jazz improvisation techniques of American singers Blossom Dearie and Ella Fitzgerald. The album's beats are influenced by various genres such as jazz and grime.

== Promotion ==
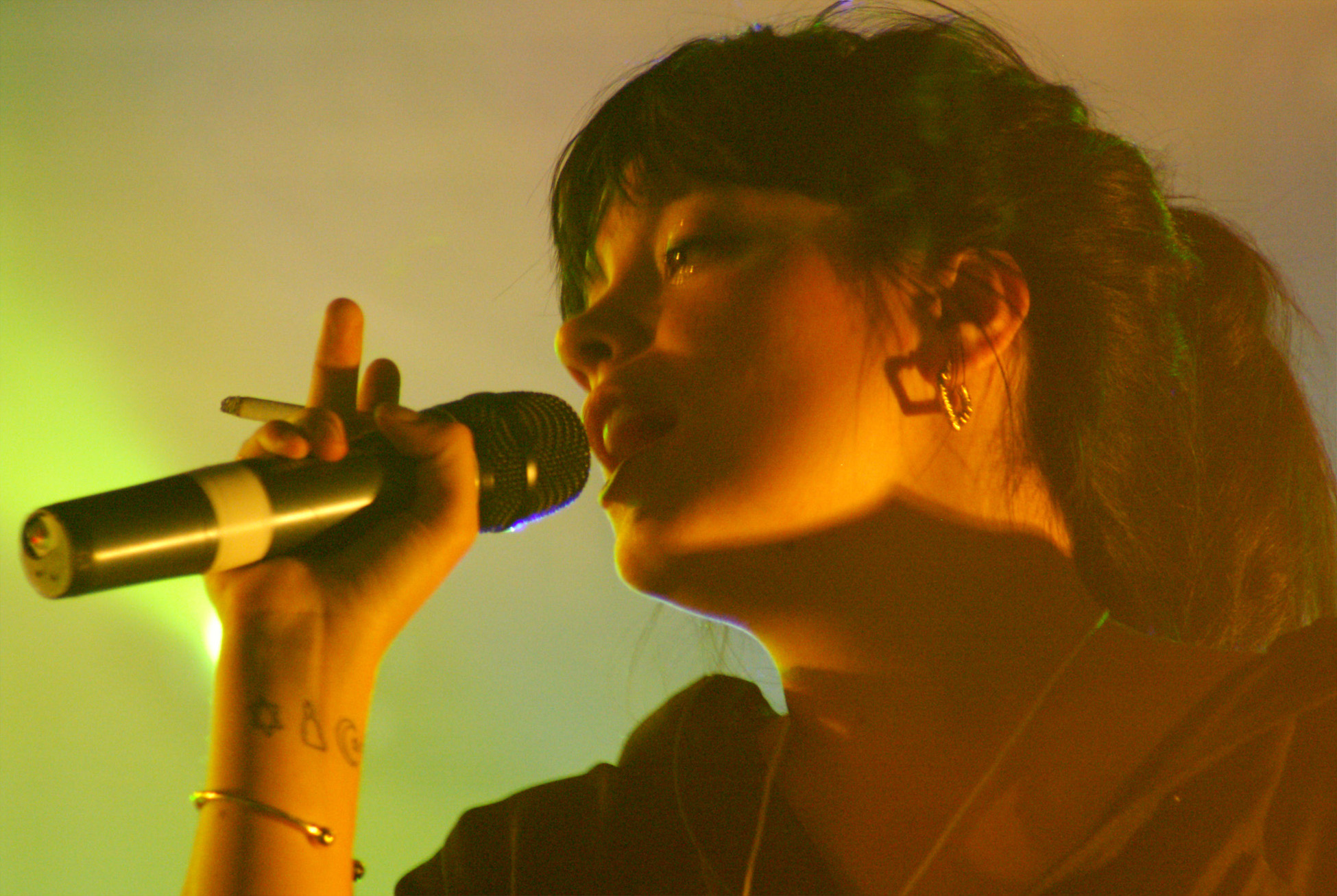
Allen performing at "Solidays" on 7 July 2007

In 2007, Allen played the newly launched Park Stage at the Glastonbury Festival, replacing M.I.A. who had cancelled. During the festival she reunited two members of the Specials, an act that guitarist Lynval Golding claimed played a "massive part" in the group's 2009 reunion.

On the day "Smile" was released, Allen appeared on BBC Radio 1's Live Lounge with DJ Jo Whiley, performing an acoustic version of "Smile" and a cover of the Kooks' song "Naïve". At the Secret Garden Party, in September 2006, Allen made a rendition of the song and afterwards stated: "The festival was well good, particularly as Lester, my ex, who I wrote 'Smile' about, and subsequently sold his story to the papers, had a tent called 'the shit tent' positioned directly opposite the main stage. So he and his new girlfriend had no option but to watch me perform to a couple of thousand people singing 'Smile' back to me. Oh, it's the little things eh!" "Smile" was performed live as part of the setlist of Allen's 2007 concert tour. During the 2007 South by Southwest music festival, Allen said, "I'm so sick of this song, but I'll play it for you, Austin" before singing it. On 3 February 2007, the singer was invited as a musical guest on Saturday Night Live, where she performed "Smile" and "LDN".

== Critical reception ==
Professional ratings
Aggregate scores
Source	Rating
Metacritic	79/100
Review scores
Source	Rating
AllMusic	4/5 stars
The A.V. Club	A−
Blender	4.5/5 stars
The Guardian	5/5 stars
MSN Music (Consumer Guide)	A−
NME	7/10
Pitchfork	8.3/10
Q	3/5 stars
Rolling Stone	3.5/5 stars
Spin	4/5 stars

Alright, Still received generally positive reviews from music critics. At Metacritic, which assigns a normalised rating out of 100 to reviews from mainstream publications, the album received an average score of 79, based on 27 reviews. The Observer's Rosie Swash stated that Allen's "uniquely acidic brand of pop" music justified the publicity it generated and that "the icing on the cake is that brutally barbed tongue". Ron Webb wrote for Drowned in Sound that the album "is almost a brilliant record, easily a good one and one that promises to divide opinion like Marmite". In a review for The Guardian, Sophie Heawood stated that "the album is rough round the edges, that amateurism serves to bring the listener in", noting that it gave the album a more personal touch. NME's Priya Elan remarked that "with a personality this size, this isn't the last time you'll be hearing from [Allen]".

The album generally received positive reviews from international music press. Rob Sheffield wrote for Rolling Stone that Allen's sense of irony was "just more proof that [she is] an original". Heather Phares of AllMusic stated that "enough of Alright, Still works—as pure pop and on the meta level Allen aims for—to make the album a fun, summery fling, and maybe more". Praising Allen for her "genuine personality with wit and attitude to spare", Pitchfork's Mark Pytlik remarked that the album "isn't anything else but a fantastic success". In his review for Blender, Jon Dolan complimented Allen's "little-sisterly" personality, describing it as a combination "of panache and self-doubt, courage and chaos".

On the other hand, Stylus Magazine dismissed the album as "nothing more than pop for people who hate pop music" and "phony music for people who can't let go of their inhibitions", while Slant Magazine deemed it "rubbish" and called Allen "sickeningly contemptuous". The mastering of Alright, Still, done by Tim Burrell and Tim Debney, has been criticised. In January 2007, The Guardian ran a piece about loudness wars, the practice of increasing the loudness of tracks which often results in distortion and the loss of dynamic range. It included Alright, Still in a list of CDs in which sound quality was compromised for loudness. Rolling Stone published a similar story in December 2007, and it also identified Alright, Still as an album "so unrelentingly loud that the sound is actually distorted".

=== Accolades ===
The Guardian ranked it the seventh best album of the year and commented, "For her lyrical nous and her quick delivery alone, get that toast on." Pitchfork called it "one of 2006's most enduringly rewarding pop albums" and listed it as the 29th best album of 2006. "Rolling Stone" ranked the album 13th on its list of the best albums of 2007. Uncut called it "a terrific, bolshy, eclectic stew of London street pop", listing Alright, Still at number 38 on its "Definitive Albums of 2006". The Observer ranked the album tenth on its list of the best albums of 2006. At the 2008 Grammy Awards, the album was nominated for Best Alternative Music Album but lost to the White Stripes' Icky Thump. Ronson's production on "Littlest Things" helped him win a Grammy Award for Producer of the Year, Non-Classical.

== Commercial performance ==
Alright, Still debuted at number two on the UK Albums Chart, selling 62,701 copies in its first week. During the week ending 3 February 2007, all top 10 places on the UK Albums Chart were occupied by British artists for the first time since the chart was established in 1956; Alright, Still was number nine that week. The British Phonographic Industry (BPI) certified it triple platinum on 14 March 2008. As of June 2018, the album had sold 1,142,062 copies in the United Kingdom.

In Ireland, the album debuted at number six on the Irish Albums Chart and was certified platinum by the Irish Recorded Music Association (IRMA). The album was less successful in continental Europe; it charted inside the top 20 in Norway, the top 30 in Belgium and the Netherlands, and the top 50 in France and Sweden. In April 2007, Alright, Still received a Platinum Europe Award by the International Federation of the Phonographic Industry (IFPI), denoting sales in excess of one million copies across Europe.

Alright, Still debuted at number 20 on the Billboard 200 in the United States, with first-week sales of 34,000 copies. The Recording Industry Association of America (RIAA) awarded the album a gold certification on 6 December 2007, and by November 2013, it had sold 627,000 copies in the US. Alright, Still peaked at number seven on the Australian ARIA Albums Chart, and in 2009, it received a platinum accreditation by the Australian Recording Industry Association (ARIA), shipping over 70,000 copies. In New Zealand, the album reached number 26 and was certified gold by the Recording Industry Association of New Zealand (RIANZ) for shipments in excess of 7,500 copies. As of February 2009, the album had sold more than 2.5 million copies worldwide.

== Track listing ==
No.	Title	Writer(s)	Producer(s)	Length
1.	"Smile"	Lily Allen; Iyiola Babalola; Darren Lewis; Jackie Mittoo; Clement Dodd	Future Cut	3:17
2.	"Knock 'Em Out"	Allen; Babalola; Lewis; Earl King	Future Cut	2:54
3.	"LDN"	Allen; Arthur "Duke" Reid; Babalola; Lewis	Future Cut	3:11
4.	"Everything's Just Wonderful"	Allen; Greg Kurstin	Kurstin	3:29
5.	"Not Big"	Allen; Kurstin	Kurstin	3:17
6.	"Friday Night"	Allen; Pablo Cook; Jonny Bull	Cook	3:07
7.	"Shame for You"	Allen; Blair MacKichan	MacKichan	4:06
8.	"Littlest Things"	Allen; Mark Ronson; Pierre Bachelet; Hervé Roy; Santi White	Ronson	3:02
9.	"Take What You Take"	Allen; Lewis; Babalola	Future Cut	4:06
10.	"Friend of Mine"	Allen; Babalola; Lewis; O'Kelly Isley, Jr.; Ernest Isley; Rudolph Isley; Ronald Isley; Marvin Isley; Chris Jasper	Future Cut	3:58
11.	"Alfie"	Allen; Kurstin	Kurstin	2:46

iTunes Store pre-order bonus track
No.	Title	Writer(s)	Producer(s)	Length
12.	"Blank Expression"	Jerry Dammers; The Specials	Future Cut	2:30

iTunes Store deluxe edition bonus tracks
No.	Title	Writer(s)	Producer(s)	Length
1.	"Mr. Blue Sky"	Jeff Lynne	Future Cut	3:42
2.	"Cheryl Tweedy"	Allen; Karen Poole; Dan Carey	Poole	3:15
3.	"Nan You're a Window Shopper" (parody of "Window Shopper" by 50 Cent)	Allen; T. Crawford; Curtis Jackson; Robert Nesta "Bob" Marley; J. H. Turnbull; Babalola; Lewis	Future Cut	2:59
4.	"Blank Expression"	Dammers; The Specials	Future Cut	2:32
5.	"Absolutely Nothing"	Allen; Poole	Poole	4:08
6.	"U Killed It"	Allen; Kurstin	Kurstin	4:24
7.	"Everybody's Changing"	Keane	Future Cut	2:40
8.	"Naïve" (BBC Radio 1's Jo Whiley's Live Lounge)	The Kooks	Future Cut	3:46

Japanese edition bonus tracks
No.	Title	Writer(s)	Producer(s)	Length
12.	"Cheryl Tweedy"	Allen; Poole; Carey	Poole	3:15
13.	"Absolutely Nothing"	Allen; Poole	Poole	4:02

US standard edition
No.	Title	Writer(s)	Producer(s)	Length
12.	"Nan You're a Window Shopper" (parody of "Window Shopper" by 50 Cent)	Allen; T. Crawford; Curtis Jackson; Robert Nesta "Bob" Marley; J. H. Turnbull; Babalola; Lewis	Future Cut	2:58
13.	"Smile" (version revisited)	Allen; Babalola; Lewis; Mittoo; Dodd	Future Cut; Ronson^{[a]}	3:13

French reissue bonus track
No.	Title	Writer(s)	Producer(s)	Length
12.	"Mr. Blue Sky"	Lynne	Future Cut	3:40

=== Notes ===
- ^{^[a]} signifies a remixer

=== Sample credits ===
- "Smile" contains replayed elements of "Free Soul" by Jackie Mittoo and Clement Dodd.
- "Knock 'Em Out" contains replayed elements of the work "Big Chief" by Earl King.
- "LDN" contains replayed elements of "Reggae Merengue".
- "Littlest Things" contains elements from "Theme from Emmanuelle (Instrumental)" and "Emmanuelle in the Mirror" written by Pierre Bachelet and Hervé Roy.
- "Friend of Mine" contains elements from "For the Love of You" written and composed by O'Kelly Isley, Jr., Ernest Isley, Rudolph Isley, Ronald Isley, Marvin Isley and Chris Jasper.

== Personnel ==
Credits adapted from the liner notes of Alright, Still.

=== Musicians ===
- Lily Allen – vocals
- Mark Ronson – beats, harp, synth strings, percussion (track 8)
- Michael Rose – saxophone (tracks 1–3)
- Paul Powell – drums (track 1)
- Jonny Wimbolt-Lewis – drums (track 9)
- Eddie Thornton – trumpet (tracks 1–3)
- Trevor Edwards – trombone (tracks 1–3)
- Clive Hunte – bass (tracks 1–3, 10)
- John Waddington – bass (track 9)
- Paul Farr – guitar (tracks 3, 10)
- Mark Nicholls – guitar (track 9)
- John Ellis – keyboards (tracks 1–3, 10)
- Oliver Bayston – keyboards (track 9)
- Darren Lewis – keyboards (tracks 1–3, 9, 10); percussion (track 2)
- Iyiola Babalola – keyboards (tracks 1–3, 10); percussion (track 9)

=== Technical ===
- Future Cut – production (tracks 1–3, 9, 10); mixing (tracks 1–3, 6, 7, 9, 10)
- Mike Pelanconi – mixing (tracks 1–3, 6, 7, 9, 10); engineering (tracks 1–3, 10)
- Dan Porter – mixing assistance (tracks 1–3, 6, 7, 10)
- Greg Kurstin – production, recording, mixing (tracks 4, 5, 11)
- Pablo Cook – production (track 6)
- Blair MacKichan – production (track 7)
- Mark Ronson – production, recording (track 8)
- Vaughan Merrick – mixing (track 8)
- Rob Smith – recording (track 8)
- Kieran Panesar – recording assistance (track 8)
- Tim Burrell – mastering
- Tim Debney – mastering
- George Atkins – engineering (track 9)
- Darren Lewis – engineering, production (tracks 1–3, 9, 10)
- Iyiola Babalola – engineering, production (tracks 1–3, 10)

=== Artwork ===
- Check Morris – artwork

== Charts ==
=== Weekly charts ===
Chart (2006–2007)	Peak position
Australian Albums (ARIA)	7
Australian Urban Albums (ARIA)	1
Belgian Albums (Ultratop Flanders)	24
Belgian Albums (Ultratop Wallonia)	79
Canadian Albums (Nielsen SoundScan)	21
Dutch Albums (Album Top 100)	27
European Albums (Billboard)	15
French Albums (SNEP)	47
Irish Albums (IRMA)	6
Italian Albums (FIMI)	92
Japanese Albums (Oricon)	37
New Zealand Albums (RMNZ)	22
Norwegian Albums (VG-lista)	15
Scottish Albums (Official Charts)	4
Swedish Albums (Sverigetopplistan)	43
Swiss Albums (Schweizer Hitparade)	53
UK Albums (Official Charts)	2
US Billboard 200	20

Chart (2009)	Peak position
Croatian Albums (HDU)	44

Chart (2026)	Peak position
Croatian International Albums (HDU)	4
Hungarian Physical Albums (MAHASZ)	38

=== Monthly charts ===
Monthly chart performance
Chart (2026)	Position
Croatian International Vinyl Albums (HDU)	4

=== Year-end charts ===
Chart (2006)	Position
Australian Urban Albums (ARIA)	12
French Albums (SNEP)	195
UK Albums (OCC)	29

Chart (2007)	Position
Australian Urban Albums (ARIA)	15
European Albums (Billboard)	83
UK Albums (OCC)	26
US Billboard 200	118

Chart (2008)	Position
Australian Urban Albums (ARIA)	36

Chart (2009)	Position
Australian Urban Albums (ARIA)	9
UK Albums (OCC)	162

Chart (2010)	Position
Australian Urban Albums (ARIA)	38

== Certifications ==
Certifications for Alright, Still
Region	Certification	Certified units/sales
Argentina (CAPIF)	Gold	20,000^{^}
Australia (ARIA)	Platinum	70,000^{^}
Canada (Music Canada)	Gold	50,000^{^}
France (SNEP)	Silver	35,000^{*}
Ireland (IRMA)	Platinum	15,000^{^}
New Zealand (RMNZ)	Platinum	15,000^{‡}
South Korea	—	1,372
United Kingdom (BPI)	4× Platinum	1,200,000^{‡}
United States (RIAA)	Gold	627,000
Summaries
Europe (IFPI)	Platinum	1,000,000^{*}
Worldwide	—	2,500,000
^{*} Sales figures based on certification alone.^{^} Shipments figures based on certification alone.^{‡} Sales+streaming figures based on certification alone.

== Release history ==
Release history for Alright, Still
Region	Date	Edition	Label	Ref.
France	13 July 2006	Standard	EMI	
Germany	13 July 2006	Standard	EMI	
Italy	14 July 2006	Standard	EMI	
United Kingdom	17 July 2006	Standard	Regal	
Australia	28 July 2006	Standard	EMI	
Canada	19 September 2006	Standard	EMI	
Japan	4 October 2006	Standard	EMI	
United States	30 January 2007	Standard	Capitol	
France	26 December 2007	Reissue	EMI	
