= Dawn Penn =

Jamaican reggae singer

- Born: 11 January 1952 (age 74); Kingston, Jamaica
- Genres: Reggae, rocksteady, dancehall
- Occupation: Singer
- Instrument: Vocals
- Years active: 1966–1970, 1987–present
- Labels: Studio One, Big Beat/Atlantic, Trojan,
- Website: www.dawnpenn.com

Dawn Penn (born 11 January 1952) is a Jamaican reggae singer. She first had a short career during the rocksteady era from 1967 to 1969, but she is most known for her single "You Don't Love Me (No, No, No)", which became a worldwide hit in 1994.

== Career ==
Penn's early recordings were composed and written by her around 1966 using session musicians. In 1967, she recorded the rocksteady single "You Don't Love Me", produced by Coxsone Dodd at Studio One. She also recorded "Why Did You Lie?" at Studio One, "Broke My Heart" for Bunny Lee, "I Let You Go Boy" and covers of "To Sir with Love" and "Here Comes the Sun". Penn also recorded for singer and producer Prince Buster early in her career with songs like "Long Day, Short Night", "Blue Yes Blue" and "Here's the Key". By 1970, Penn had left the music industry and had moved to the Virgin Islands. However, she faced racism there, and in 1987, she returned to Jamaica and to music.

"You Don't Love Me (No, No, No)"
An audio sample of "[You Don't Love Me (No, No, No)"

In the summer of 1992, she was invited to appear on stage at a Studio One anniversary show, where she performed the song "You Don't Love Me" with Steely & Clevie as backing musicians. The performance was a success, and she returned to the recording studio to re-record the song for the tribute album Steely & Clevie Play Studio One Vintage. It was released as the single "You Don't Love Me (No, No, No)" over a year later, reaching the charts in the U.S. and Europe, hitting number one in her native Jamaica, and making number three in the UK Singles Chart. Penn's album No, No, No, was released on Big Beat Records in 1994.

"You Don't Love Me (No, No, No)" has been sampled and covered by the artists Kano, Hexstatic, Jae Millz, 311, Ghostface Killah, Mims, Eve featuring Stephen Marley, and Damian Marley. Their versions were renamed as "No, No, No", except for Ghostface's, which was named "The Splash", and 311's "Omaha Stylee".

Penn performed at the Drum in Birmingham, England, in April 2006, and, in the same year, she was on the bill at the Uppsala Reggae Festival in Sweden. In 2011, Penn released a music video for the song "City Life", directed by Antoine Dixon-Bellot. On 30 June 2013, Penn performed "You Don't Love Me (No, No, No)" at the BET Awards. In 2014, The Lee Thompson Ska Orchestra released the single "Bangarang" featuring Penn on lead vocals, and she appeared in the official video to accompany the single. Penn joined the Ska Orchestra on stage to perform the track on Halloween night 2013, at The Jazz Café in London's Camden Town. Penn also appeared with Thompson and backing singer Darren Fordham on Jools Holland's 2013/2014 Hootenanny and again at the Glastonbury Festival in 2014.

Penn features on the track "Crocadillaz" alongside De La Soul on Gorillaz's 2023 studio album Cracker Island.

== Discography ==
=== Albums ===
List of studio albums, with selected chart positions
Title	Year	Peak chart positions		
Title	Year	AUT	GER	UK
No, No, No	1994	25	53	51
Come Again	1996	—	—	—
Never Hustle the Music	2004	—	—	—
Vintage	2010	—	—	—
Vintage 2	2012	—	—	—
Conscious	2012	—	—	—

=== Extended plays ===
- EP (2011)

=== Singles ===
List of singles, with selected chart positions
Title	Year	Peak chart positions										Certifications
Title	Year	AUS	AUT	BEL (FL)	FRA	GER	NLD	NZ	SWI	UK	US	Certifications
"Long Days, Short Night"	1966	—	—	—	—	—	—	—	—	—	—	
"You Don't Love Me"	1967	—	—	—	—	—	—	—	—	—	—	
"Why Did You Lie"	1967	—	—	—	—	—	—	—	—	—	—	
"You Don't Love Me (No, No, No)"	1994	74	13	8	41	41	38	25	17	3	58	BPI: Gold; RMNZ: Platinum
"Night & Day"	1994	—	—	—	—	—	—	—	—	81	—	
"What Do You Do?"	1995	—	—	—	—	—	—	—	—	—	—	
"Looking for a Lion"	2003	—	—	—	—	—	—	—	—	—	—	
"Growing Up"	2004	—	—	—	—	—	—	—	—	—	—	
"Love the One You're With"	2005	—	—	—	—	—	—	—	—	—	—	
"Broke My Heart"	2011	—	—	—	—	—	—	—	—	—	—	
"To Sir with Love"	2011	—	—	—	—	—	—	—	—	—	—	
"I'll Let You Go Boy"	2012	—	—	—	—	—	—	—	—	—	—	
"I'll Get You"	2012	—	—	—	—	—	—	—	—	—	—	
"Reality Check"	2013	—	—	—	—	—	—	—	—	—	—	
"Music Is the Magic"	2014	—	—	—	—	—	—	—	—	—	—	
"Chilling"	2015	—	—	—	—	—	—	—	—	—	—	

== See also ==
- List of Jamaicans
- List of reggae musicians
- List of stage names
- List of performances on Top of the Pops
