= Offscreen =

Fictional events not seen on screen

The terms off-screen, off-camera, and off-stage refer to fictional events in theatre, television, or film which are not seen on stage or in frame, but are merely heard by the audience, or described (or implied) by the characters or narrator. Off-screen action often leaves much to the audience's imagination. As a narrative mode and stylistic device, it may be used for a number of dramatic effects. It may also be used to save time in storytelling, to circumvent technical or financial constraints of a production, or to meet content rating standards.

== Uses ==
In ancient Greek drama, events were often recounted to the audience by a narrator, rather than being depicted on the stage. Offscreen voice-over narration continues to be a common tool for conveying information authoritatively.

Charlie Chaplin made use of offscreen action to humorous effect. In a deleted scene in Shoulder Arms (1918), Chaplin's character is berated by an abusive wife who is never seen on camera; her presence is merely implied by household objects hurled in Chaplin's direction. In The Kid (1921), his character The Tramp is asked the name of the baby he recently found abandoned. He quickly ducks into a nearby building, emerges seconds later smoothing the child's blankets, and announces, "John" – implying that he had not even determined the child's sex, much less given it a name, until that moment. In City Lights (1931), Chaplin's Tramp is preparing for a boxing match. He asks another boxer a question which the audience is not privy to. He then follows the man's direction off screen, before returning moments later and asking the man to help him remove his boxing gloves – the implication being that he was going to the bathroom. Later, it's shown that he was merely looking for a water fountain.

In the horror genre, placing action offstage or offscreen often serves to heighten the dramatic force of a scene. The Grand Guignol theatre in Paris made much use of this technique; in 1901's Au tėlėphone, the violence is presented at the remove of a telephone connection. In 1931's Dracula, director Tod Browning uses offscreen action to avoid showing scenes of murder, and obscures the action of Dracula rising from his grave. While this served to meet Motion Picture Production Code standards, which dictated that "brutal killings are not to be shown in detail", Browning's offscreen action also maintains the macabre mood of the film. The choice of what the audience is shown in place of the elided action can also contribute to the sense of horror through its symbolic value. In Dr. Jekyll and Mr. Hyde (1931), during the murder of Ivy Pierson, director Rouben Mamoulian focuses his camera on a statuette of Psyche Revived by Cupid's Kiss, which acts as an ironic commentary on the action.

Offscreen action is often used in sex scenes, with the camera panning from the beginning of a romantic encounter to a symbolic replacement object, such as a roaring fireplace, a lit candle at first tall and then shorter to show the passage of time, or (in parody) a train entering a tunnel.

Off-screen can be employed in political cinema to suggest what is suppressed by authorities. Jafar Panahi exemplifies this use artistically by incorporating the concepts of andaruni (the inner domain) and biruni (the outer domain) from Iranian culture. In his 2006 film Offside, he critiques traditional norms upheld by the Islamic Republic of Iran, notably by empowering women and challenging established gender roles.

Offscreen action may also be used when a scene would otherwise require costly sets, locations, makeup, or special effects to present convincingly.

== See also ==
- Deleted scene
- Diegesis and mimesis, alternate modes of storytelling
- Dissolve
