= Hervé Roy =

French songwriter and singer (1943–2009)

- Hervé Roy

Background information
- Born: 1943; France
- Died: 2009 (aged 65–66) France
- Genres: Film score, pop
- Occupations: Composer, musician, singer, record producer

Hervé Roy (French pronunciation: [ɛʁve ʁwa]; 1943–2009) was a French musician, singer, composer, and record producer.

== Biography ==
After studying musical composition and dramatic art at the Conservatoire de Paris, he composed and arranged for many performers since 1966, including Johnny Hallyday, Gilbert Becaud, Claude François, Michel Sardou, Jean-Jacques Goldman, Enrico Macias, Richard Clayderman, Hervé Vilard, Brigitte Bardot, Françoise Hardy, and Charles Aznavour. He was an orchestra conductor from 1994 to 2004, as well as composer or arranger of film music with Pierre Bachelet, Michel Polnareff and many others. He was also a record producer for Calogero's early solo career. He was also orchestral conductor in the Eurovision, conducting the Monégasque entry in 1969, the Swiss entry in 1973, and the Luxembourgish entry in 1979. He was conductor in the Victoires de la musique contests as well.

He composed and arranged many film scores, such as Un linceul n'a pas de poches (including the multi-million seller "Dolannes Melodie"), Emmanuelle, Quelques messieurs trop tranquilles, Delusions of Grandeur, Men, Women: A User's Manual, Asphalt Warriors, and Podium.

His composition called "Lover's Theme" was featured in the viral shock video titled 2 Girls 1 Cup in 2007.

Roy held a position in SPEDIDAM, an artists' rights management company, until his death in 2009.
