= Steely & Clevie =

Jamaican production duo

- Origin: Kingston, Jamaica
- Genres: Dancehall; reggae
- Years active: 1973–2009
- Labels: Steely & Clevie; Profile; Rounder; VP
- Members: Cleveland "Clevie" Browne
- Past members: Wycliffe "Steely" Johnson
- Website: Myspace; Website

Steely & Clevie was a Jamaican dancehall reggae production duo that was composed of members Wycliffe Johnson and Cleveland Browne. The duo worked with artists such as the Specials, Gregory Peck ("Poco Man Jam", 1989), Bounty Killer, Elephant Man, and No Doubt.

Steely debuted as a keyboardist with Sugar Minott's Youth Promotion collective in the 1970s, playing the keyboards on Minott's 1978 album, Ghetto-ology. Clevie pioneered the use of drum machines in reggae. Steely and Clevie first played together at Lee "Scratch" Perry's Black Ark Studios during the late 1970s. In 1986, the duo was the house band at King Jammy's Studio, which became the center point of late-1980s reggae, by which time Steely & Clevie were established production leaders with an immense slew of 12-inch and dub singles. The duo formed the Steely & Clevie label in 1987, a year in which reggae riddims and dub-influenced hip-hop production by Ced Gee and KRS-One in the Bronx became prominent.

In 1991, Steely & Clevie produced and co-wrote several tracks on Lady Levi's only album, The Legend of Lady Levi. In 1993 they produced and co-wrote three tracks for Billy Ocean's eighth studio album Time to Move On, including the single "Pressure". In 1994, Steely & Clevie produced a new version of the 1967 track "You Don't Love Me (No, No, No)" by Dawn Penn for the album Steely and Clevie Play Studio One Vintage. The track was released as a single that same year and became a US Billboard Hot 100 hit.

In 2004, Steely was charged with dangerous driving after being involved in an accident in which high-school student Shakara Harris was fatally injured. Steely was cleared of all charges in November 2005.

On 1 September 2009, Steely died in a hospital in East Patchogue, New York. He had been suffering from pneumonia after having recovered from kidney complications in December 2008. He had surgery for a blood clot in the brain shortly before he died. Clevie continues to produce and record.

In 2021, Steely's estate and Clevie filed a lawsuit in California's central district court against Universal Music Group and Warner Chappell Music for ownership of over 1,800 reggaeton songs. The "Fish Market" riddim, produced by the duo in the 1980s, became the basis for reggaeton's "Dem Bow" riddim, which has been used in over 1,800 tracks according to the suit.
