= Foxface =

Foxface may refer to:

- Foxface (band)
- Foxface, a Hunger Games character
- Foxface rabbitfish, a common name for the fish siganus vulpinus
- Solanum mammosum, a fruit known as Fox Face (フォックスフェイス) in Japan
