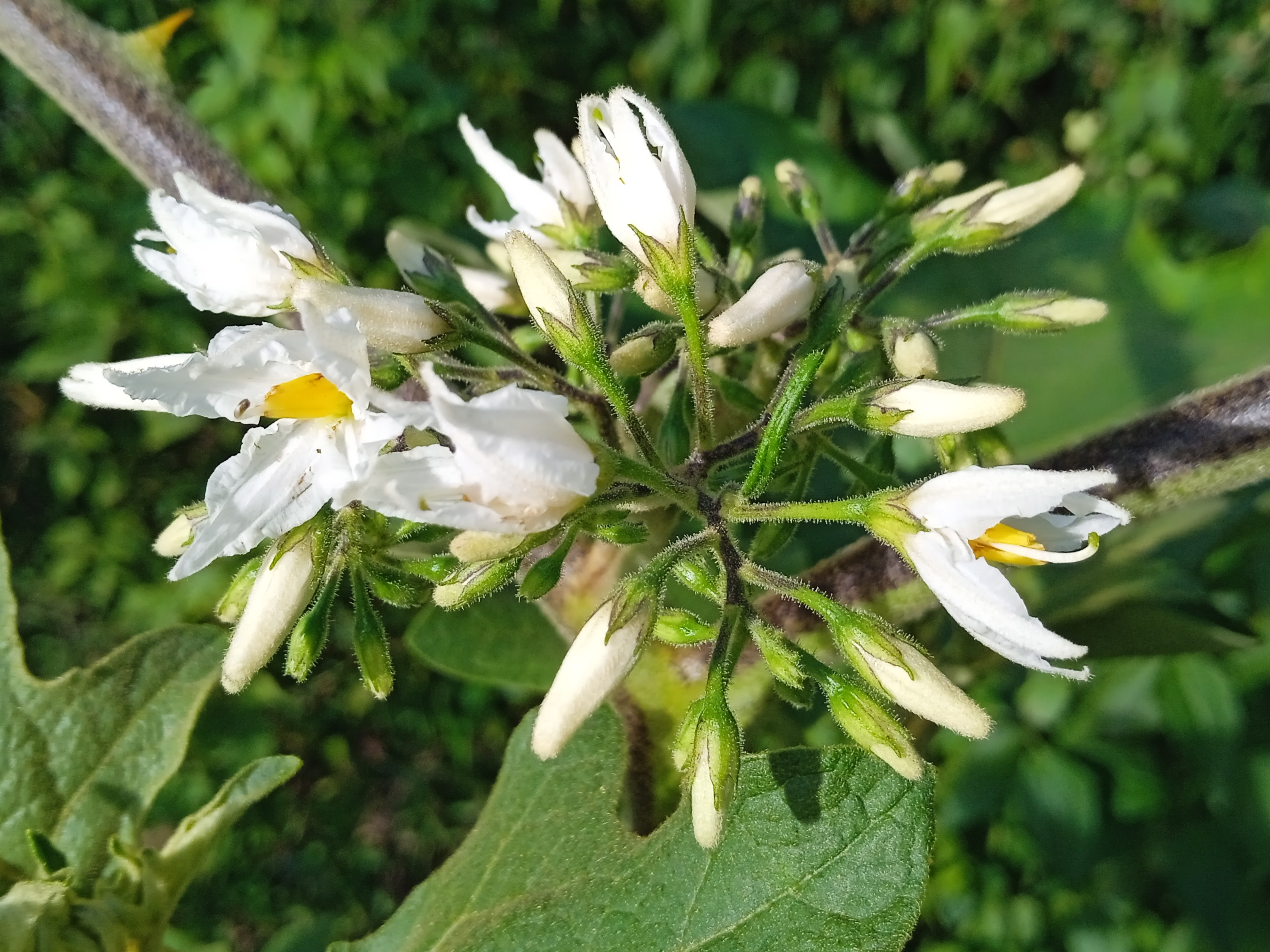
- S. torvum in Malaysia

Scientific classification
- Kingdom: Plantae
- Clade: Tracheophytes
- Clade: Angiosperms
- Clade: Eudicots
- Clade: Asterids
- Order: Solanales
- Family: Solanaceae
- Genus: Solanum
- Species: S. torvum

Binomial name
- Solanum torvum Sw.

Synonyms
- Solanum ferrugineum Jacq. Solanum mayanum Lundell; Solanum verapazense Standl. & Steyerm.

= Solanum torvum =

Species of flowering plant

Solanum torvum, also known as pendejera, turkey berry, devil's fig, pea eggplant, platebrush or susumber, is a bushy, erect and spiny perennial plant used horticulturally as a rootstock for eggplant. Grafted plants are very vigorous and tolerate diseases affecting the root system, thus allowing the crop to continue for a second year.

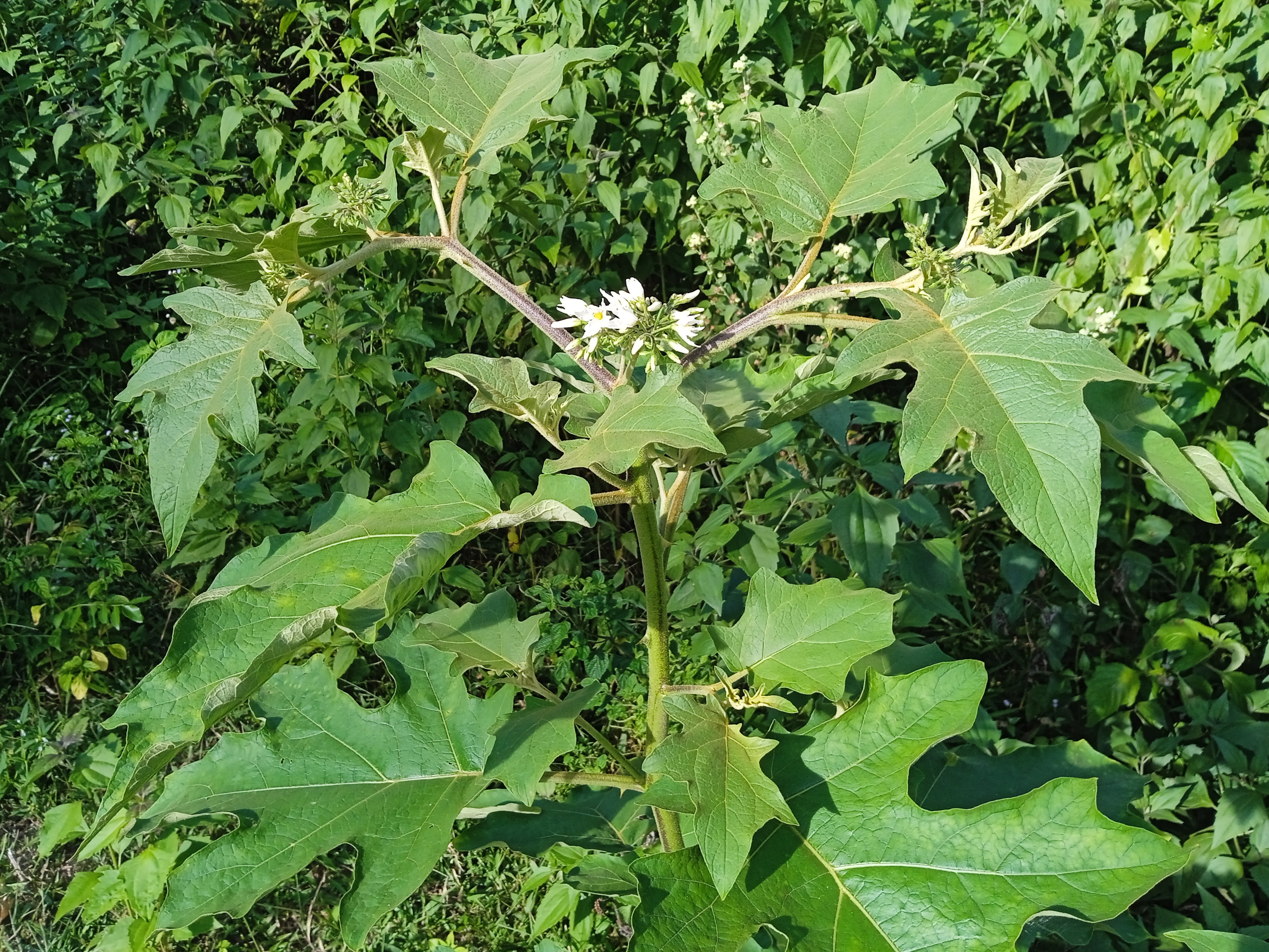
Foliage

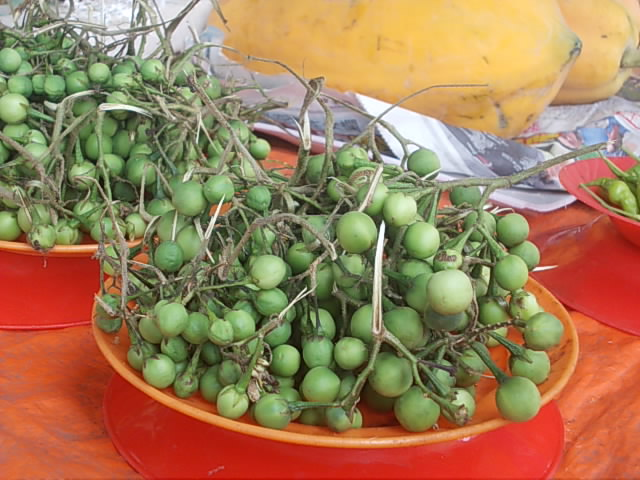
Sold at morning markets in Malaysia

== Description ==
The plant is usually 2 or 3 m in height and 2 cm in basal diameter, but may reach 5m in height and 8 cm in basal diameter. The shrub usually has a single stem at ground level, but it may branch on the lower stem. The stem bark is gray and nearly smooth with raised lenticels. The inner bark has a green layer over an ivory color (Little and others 1974). The plants examined by the author, growing on firm soil, had weak taproots and well-developed laterals. The roots are white. Foliage is confined to the growing twigs.

The twigs are gray-green and covered with star-shaped hairs. The spines are short and slightly curved and vary from thick throughout the plant, including the leaf midrib, to entirely absent. The leaves are opposite or one per node, broadly ovate with the border entire or deeply lobed. The petioles are 1 to 6 cm long and the blades are 7 to 23 by 5 to 18 cm and covered with short hairs. The flowers are white, tubular with 5 pointed lobes, and grouped in corymbiform cymes. They are shed soon after opening.

The fruits are berries that grow in clusters of tiny green spheres (ca. 1 cm in diameter) that look like green peas. They become yellow when fully ripe. They are thin-fleshed and contain numerous flat, round, brown seeds (Howard 1989, Liogier 1995, Little and others 1974).

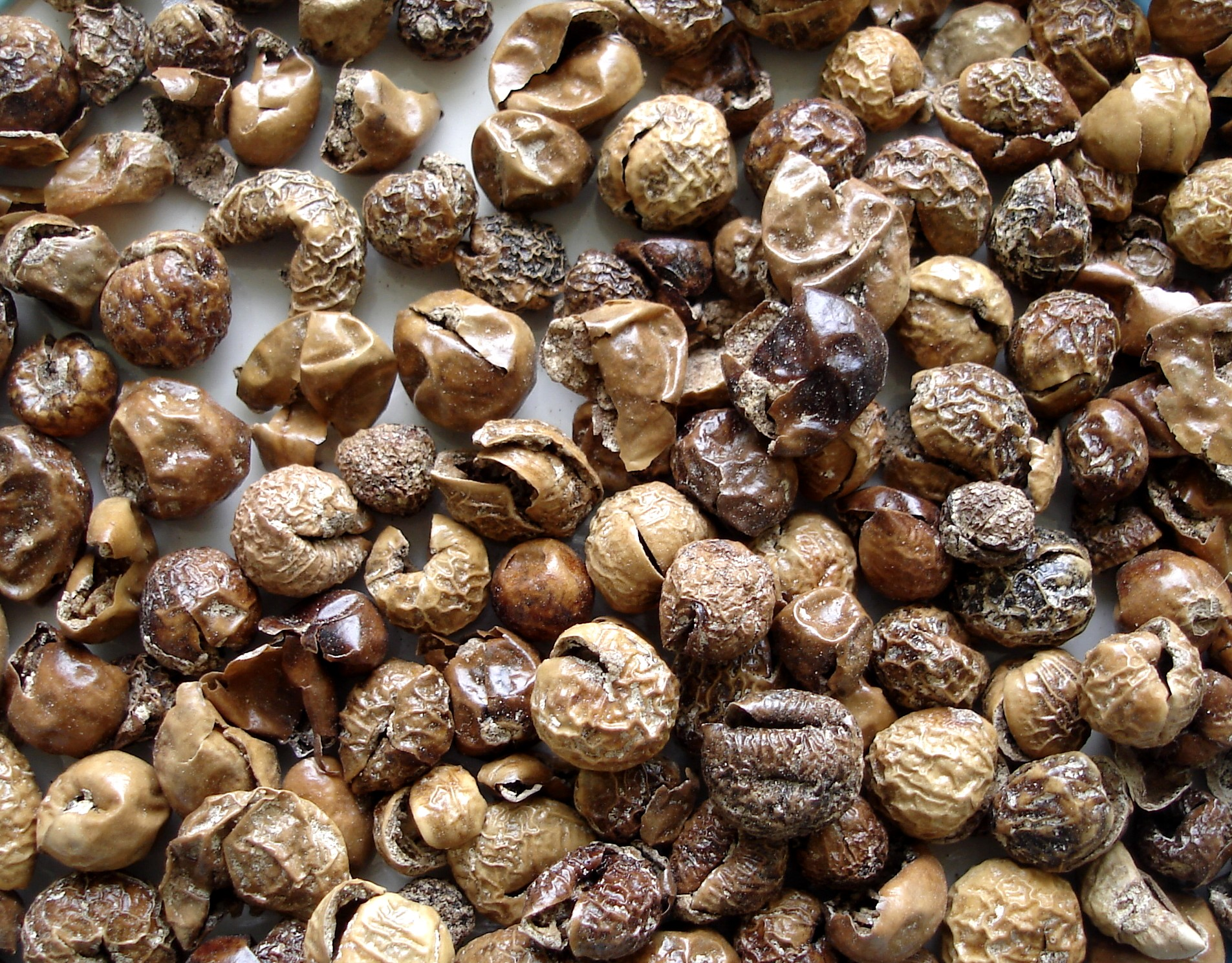
Dried turkey berry

=== Reproduction ===
Flowering and fruiting is continuous after the shrubs reach about 1 to 1.5 m in height. Ripe fruits collected in Puerto Rico averaged 1.308 + 0.052 g. Air dry seeds from these fruits weighed an average of 0.00935 g or 1,070,000 seeds/kg. These seeds were sown on commercial potting mix and 60 percent germinated between 13 and 106 days following sowing. The seedlings are common in recently disturbed ground. Frugivorous birds eat the fruits and spread the seeds (Pacific Island Ecosystems at Risk 2001). Turkey berry can be propagated vegetatively by placing branch cuttings, with or without leaves, in a mist chamber for one month (Badola and others 1993).

=== Growth and management ===
Turkey berry grows about 0.75 to 1.5 m in height per year. The species is not long-lived; most plants live about 2 years. Physical control of the shrub may be done by grubbing out the plants; lopping will not kill them. They can be killed by translocated herbicides applied to the leaves or the cut stumps (Pacific Island Ecosystems at Risk 2001).

== Taxonomy ==
=== Antiquated ===
Several other Solanum species have at one time been included in S. torvum as subspecies or varieties:

- Solanum bahamense of Carl Linnaeus (as var.? persicifolium)
- Solanum chrysotrichum of von Schlechtendal (as var. pleiotomum)
- Solanum ferrugineum (as var. ferrugineum, var. hartwegianum)
- Solanum lanceolatum of Cavanilles (as var. schiedeanum)
- Solanum macaonense (as var. lasiostylum)
- Solanum rudepannum (as var. fructipendulum, var. ochraceo-ferrugineum)
- Solanum scuticum (as ssp./var. brasiliense, var. daturifolium, var. genuinum)

== History ==
=== Etymology ===
==== Antiquated synonyms ====
A number of more or less ambiguous and now-invalid names have been used for S. torvum:

- Solanum acanthifolium Hort. Par. ex Dunal, in DC. (non Mill.: preoccupied)

Solanum acanthifolium of Philip Miller is S. campechiense as described by Carl Linnaeus.

- Solanum campechiense Hort. Par. ex Dunal, in DC. (non L.: preoccupied)
- Solanum crotonoides Michx. ex Dunal, in DC. (non Lam.: preoccupied)

Solanum crotonoides of Sieber from Presl is S. lanceifolium as described by von Jacquin.

- Solanum ficifolium Ortega
- Solanum heterophyllum Balb. ex Dunal, in DC. (non Lam.: preoccupied)

Solanum heterophyllum of Lamarck is S. subinerme

- Solanum largiflorum C.T.White
- Solanum maccai Bertero ex Dunal, in DC. (non Dunal in Poir.: preoccupied)

Solanum maccai of Dunal in Poiret is S. stramoniifolium as described by von Jacquin.

- Solanum mammosum Herb. ex Dunal, in DC. (non L.: preoccupied)

Solanum mammosum of Pavón Jiménez from Dunal in de Candolle is S. circinatum.

- Solanum mannii C.H.Wright

Solanum mannii var. compactum of C.H. Wright is S. anomalum.

- Solanum mayanum Lundell
- Solanum sanctum Jan ex Dunal, in DC. (non L.: preoccupied)

Solanum sanctum of Carl Linnaeus is S. incanum as described by the same author.

- Solanum torvum var. typicum Hochr. (nom. illeg)

== Location ==
Turkey berry apparently is native from Florida and southern Alabama through the West Indies and from Mexico through Central America and South America through Brazil (Little and others 1974). Because of its rapid spread as a weed in disturbed lands, it is difficult to tell which populations are native and which are introduced. Turkey berry has been introduced and naturalized throughout tropical Africa, Asia, Australia, and the Pacific Islands including Hawaii, Guam, and American Samoa (Pacific Island Ecosystems at Risk 2001). In Jamaica this berry is called susumba, or gully beans, and is usually cooked in a dish along with saltfish and ackee. It is believed to be full of iron (it does have a strong iron like taste when eaten) and is consumed when one is low in iron.

== Ecology ==
In Puerto Rico, turkey berry grows in upland sites that receive from about 1000 to 4000 mm of annual precipitation. It also grows in riparian zones in drier areas. Turkey berry grows on all types of moist, fertile soil at elevations from near sea level to almost 1,000 m in Puerto Rico (Little and others 1974) and 2,000 m in Papua New Guinea (Pacific Island Ecosystems at Risk 2001). Given an equal start after disturbance, turkey berry quickly overtops most herbs, grasses, and other shrubs. It grows best in full sunlight and does well in light shade or shade for part of the day, but cannot survive under a closed forest canopy. Turkey berry single plants, groups, and thickets are most frequently seen on roadsides, vacant lots, brushy pastures, recently abandoned farmland, landslides, and river banks.

It is considered invasive in New Caledonia, where it was likely introduced in 1900.

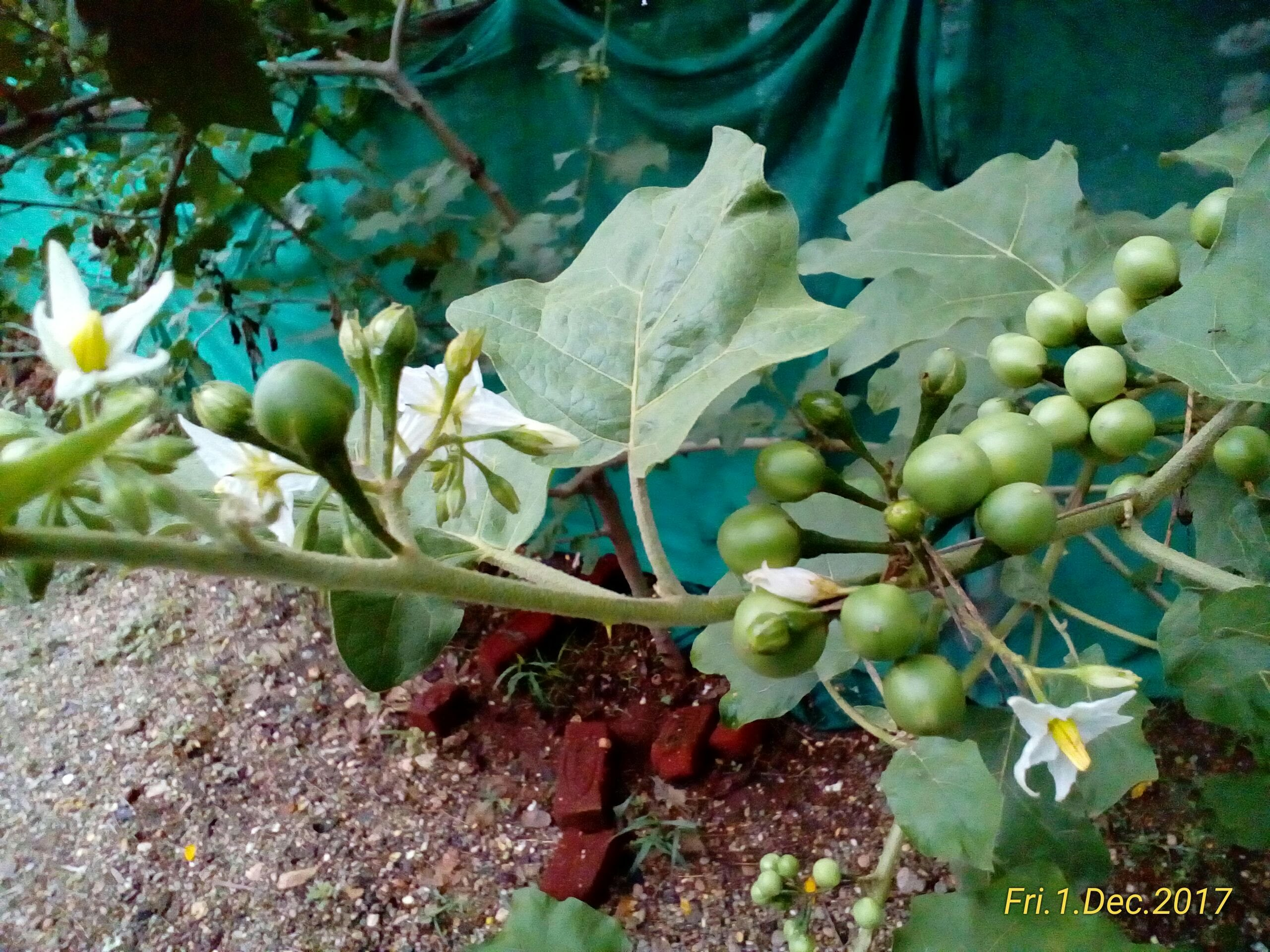
Flowers and fruit

== Composition ==
=== Chemistry ===
Turkey berry contains a number of potentially pharmacologically active chemicals including the sapogenin steroid chlorogenin.

Aqueous extracts of turkey berry are lethal to mice by depressing the number of erythrocytes, leukocytes and platelets in their blood (Tapia and others 1996).

Extracts of the plant are reported to be useful in the treatment of hyperactivity, colds and cough, pimples, skin diseases, and leprosy.

Methyl caffeate, extracted from the fruit of S. torvum, shows an antidiabetic effect in streptozotocin-induced diabetic rats.

Cholinergic poisoning has been reported as a result of the consumption of Solanum torvum berries prepared in Jamaican dishes.

== Uses ==
=== Culinary ===
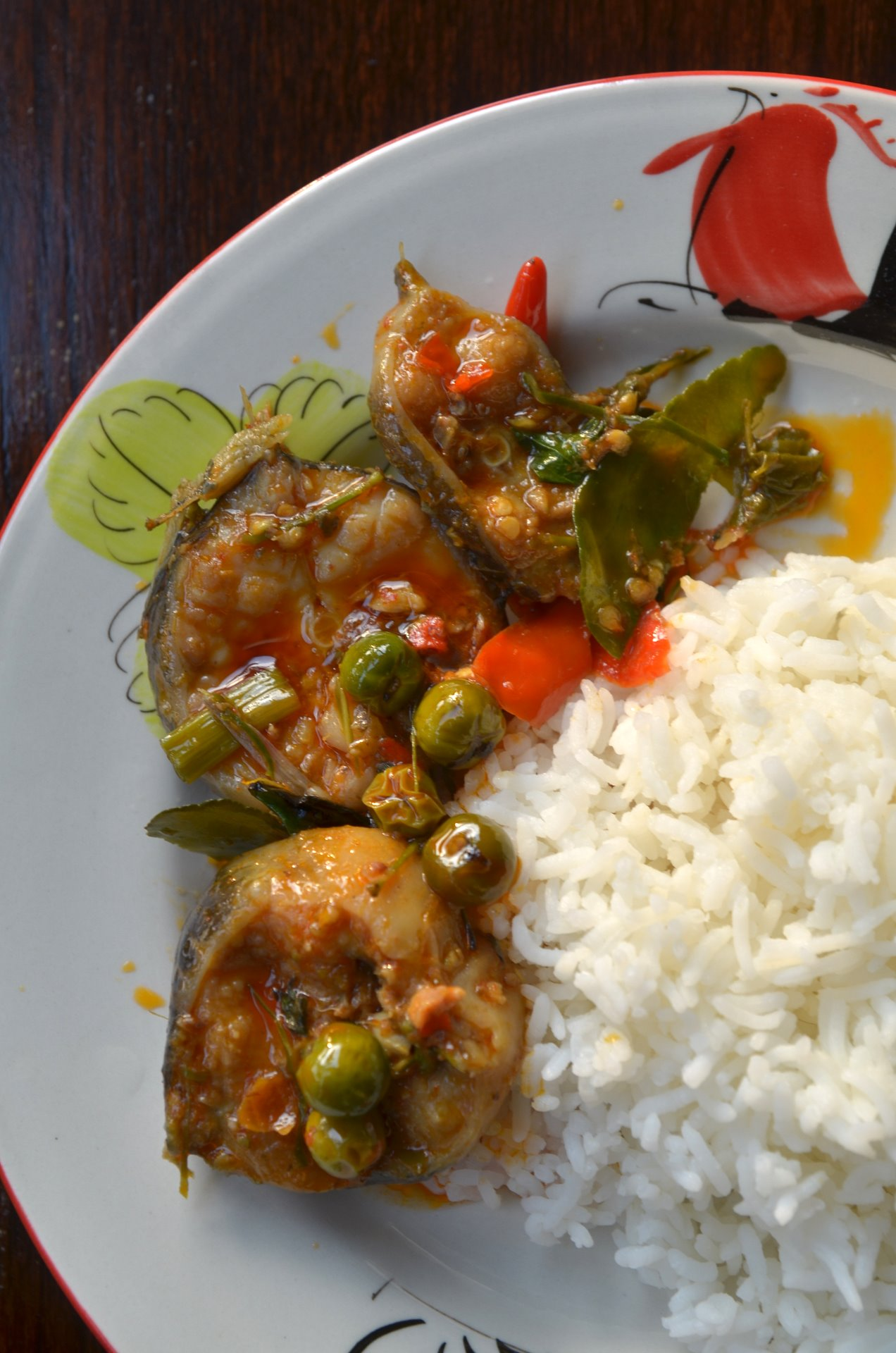
Pla duk phat phet is a fried Thai catfish curry, here containing solanum torvum

The green fresh fruits are edible and used in Thai, Lao, Cambodian and Burmese cuisine, as an ingredient in certain Thai curries or raw in certain Thai chili pastes (nam phrik). They are also used in Jamaican cuisine. The fruits are incorporated into soups and sauces in the Côte d'Ivoire (Herzog and Gautier-Béguin 2001).

The fruit is also used in Ghanaian cuisine, in stews such as kontomire stew.

In Tamil Nadu, India, the fruit is consumed directly, or as cooked food. In siddha medicine, one of the traditional medicine systems of India, an extract of this berry is used to improve digestion.

=== In Haitian culture ===
This fruit is reportedly used in Haitian voodoo rituals.

== Cultivation ==
=== Grafting ===
Turkey berry has been grafted with eggplant in an attempt to incorporate favorable genes for resistance to Verticillium wilt into the vegetable.
