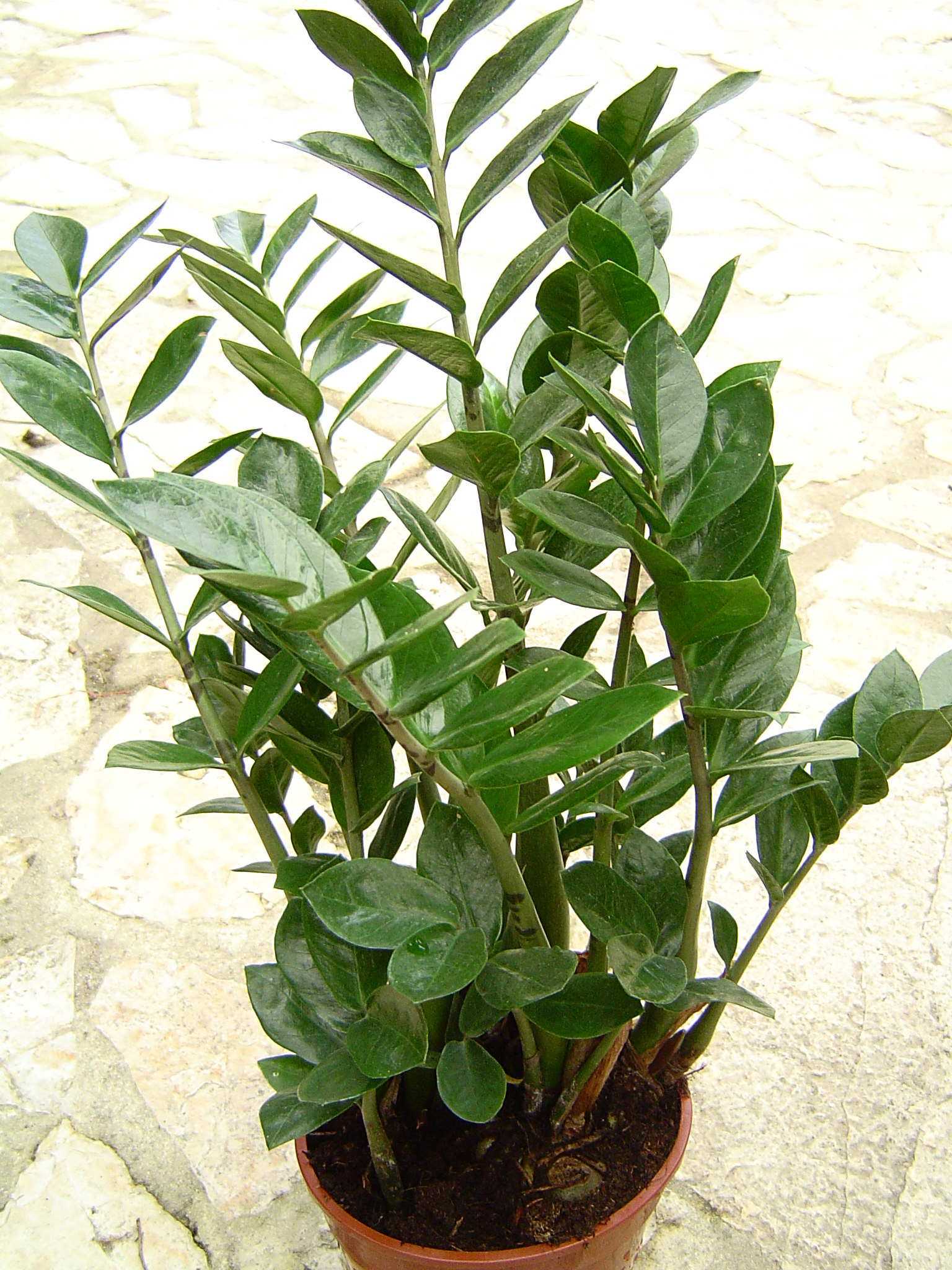
- A cultivated specimen

Scientific classification
- Kingdom: Plantae
- Clade: Tracheophytes
- Clade: Angiosperms
- Clade: Monocots
- Order: Alismatales
- Family: Araceae
- Subfamily: Zamioculcadoideae
- Genus: Zamioculcas; Schott
- Species: Z. zamiifolia

Binomial name
- Zamioculcas zamiifolia (Lodd.) Engl.

= Zamioculcas =

Species of plant

Zamioculcas is a genus of flowering plants in the family Araceae, containing the single species Zamioculcas zamiifolia. It is a tropical herbaceous perennial plant, and is native to eastern Africa, including Kenya, KwaZulu-Natal, Malawi, Mozambique, Tanzania, and Zimbabwe. Its common names include Zanzibar gem, Zuzu plant, emerald palm, ZZ plant, aroid palm and eternity plant. It is commonly grown as a houseplant, mainly because it has attractive glossy foliage and is easy to care for. Zamioculcas zamiifolia is winter-hardy in USDA Zones 9 and 10.

== Description ==
=== Vegetative characteristics ===
It is a terrestrial, succulent, slowly growing, poisonous, evergreen, rhizomatous, perennial herb with erect, pinnately compound, 40–60 cm long leaves bearing 6–8 leaflet pairs. The petiole is thick. It has a large bulbous, fleshy, potato-like rhizome.

=== Generative characteristics ===
The flowers are produced in a small, bright yellow to brown or bronze spadix 5–7 cm (2–3 in) long and wrapped in a yellow-green spathe. The whole inflorescence is partly hidden among the branch bases. Flowering is from midsummer to early autumn.

=== Chromosome count ===
The chromosome count is 2n = 34.

== Taxonomy ==
It was first described as Caladium zamiifolium G.Lodd. by Conrad Loddiges in 1829. It was placed into a new monotypic genus Zamioculcas Schott as Zamioculcas zamiifolia (G.Lodd.) Engl. by Adolf Engler in 1905.

=== Etymology ===
The genus Zamioculcas derives its name from the similarity of its foliage to that of the cycad genus Zamia and its kinship to the Araceae genus Colocasia, whose name comes from the word culcas or colcas (from an ancient Middle Eastern name), Arabic qolqas (Egyptian Arabic: قلقاس, IPA: [ʔolˈʔæːs]), i.e. taro.

The species name zamiifolia means "leaves like Zamia" and is formed from the botanical name Zamia and the Latin word folium, leaf.

== Distribution and habitat ==
It is native to Kenya, South Africa (KwaZulu-Natal), Malawi, Mozambique, Tanzania, and Zimbabwe.

== Conservation ==
In South Africa, its national conservation status is least concern (LC).

== Cultivation ==
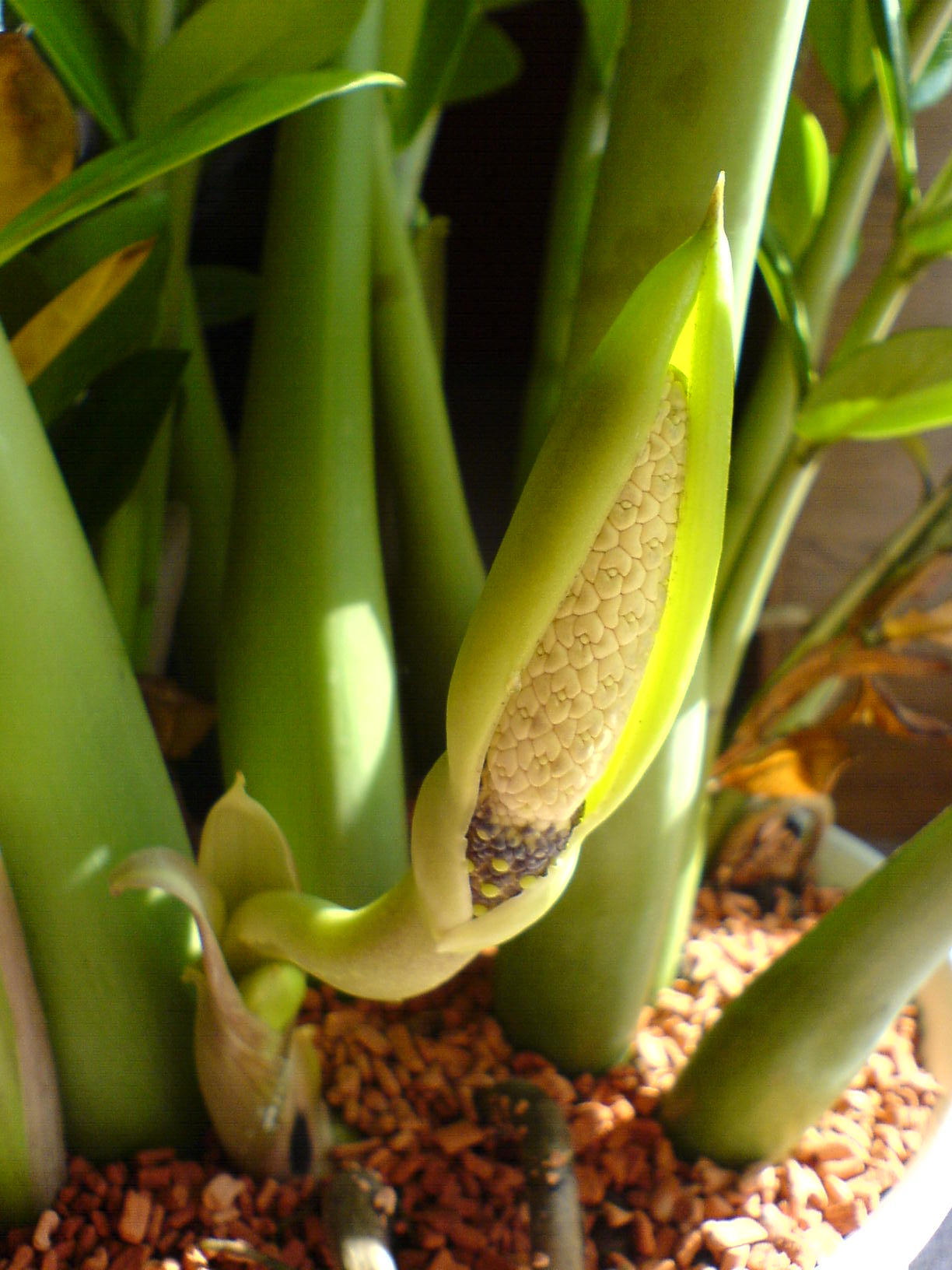
Inflorescence

It is cultivated as a houseplant. Dutch nurseries began wide-scale commercial propagation of the plant around 1996.

=== Cultivars ===
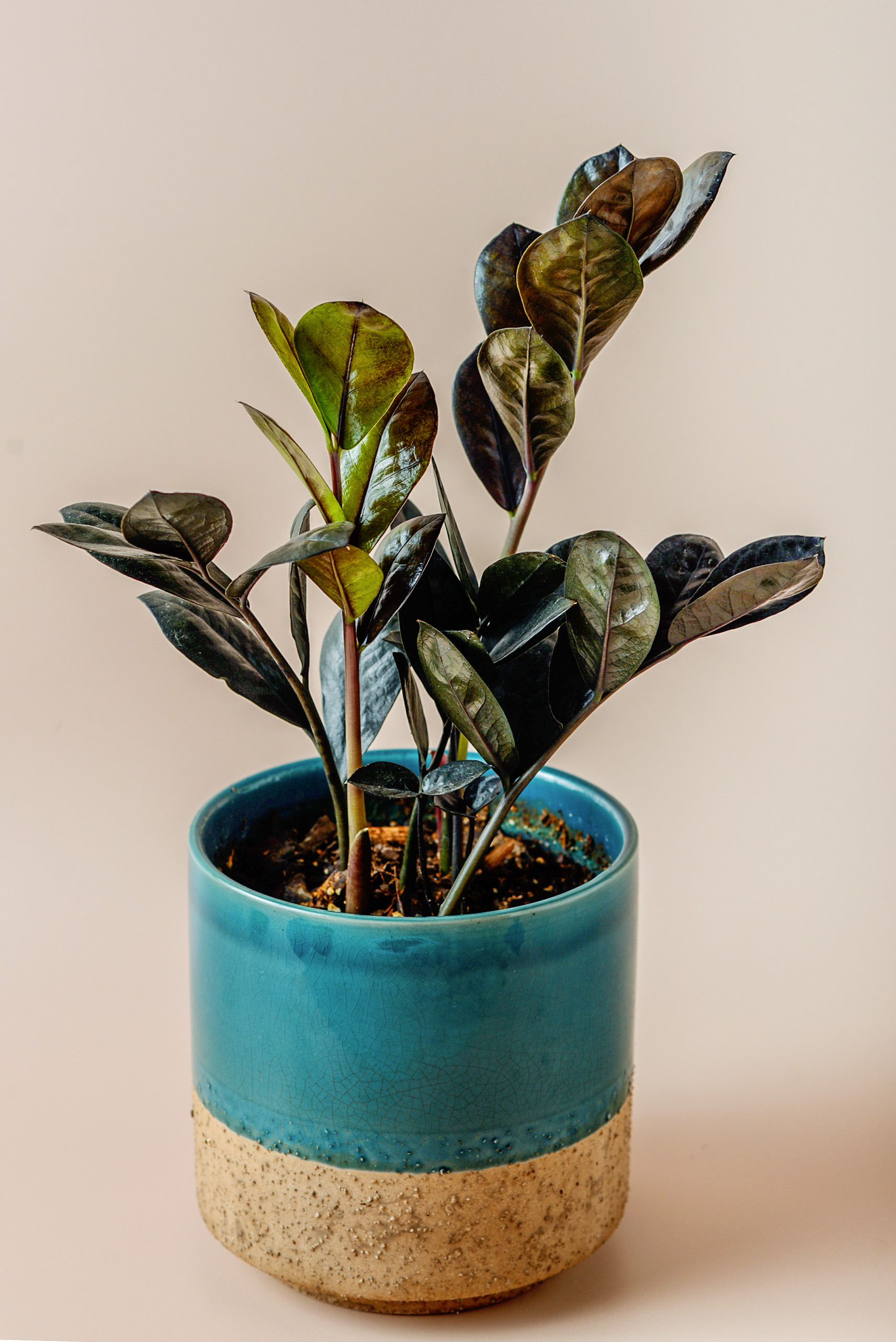
Raven ZZ Zamioculcas zamiifolia 'Dowon'

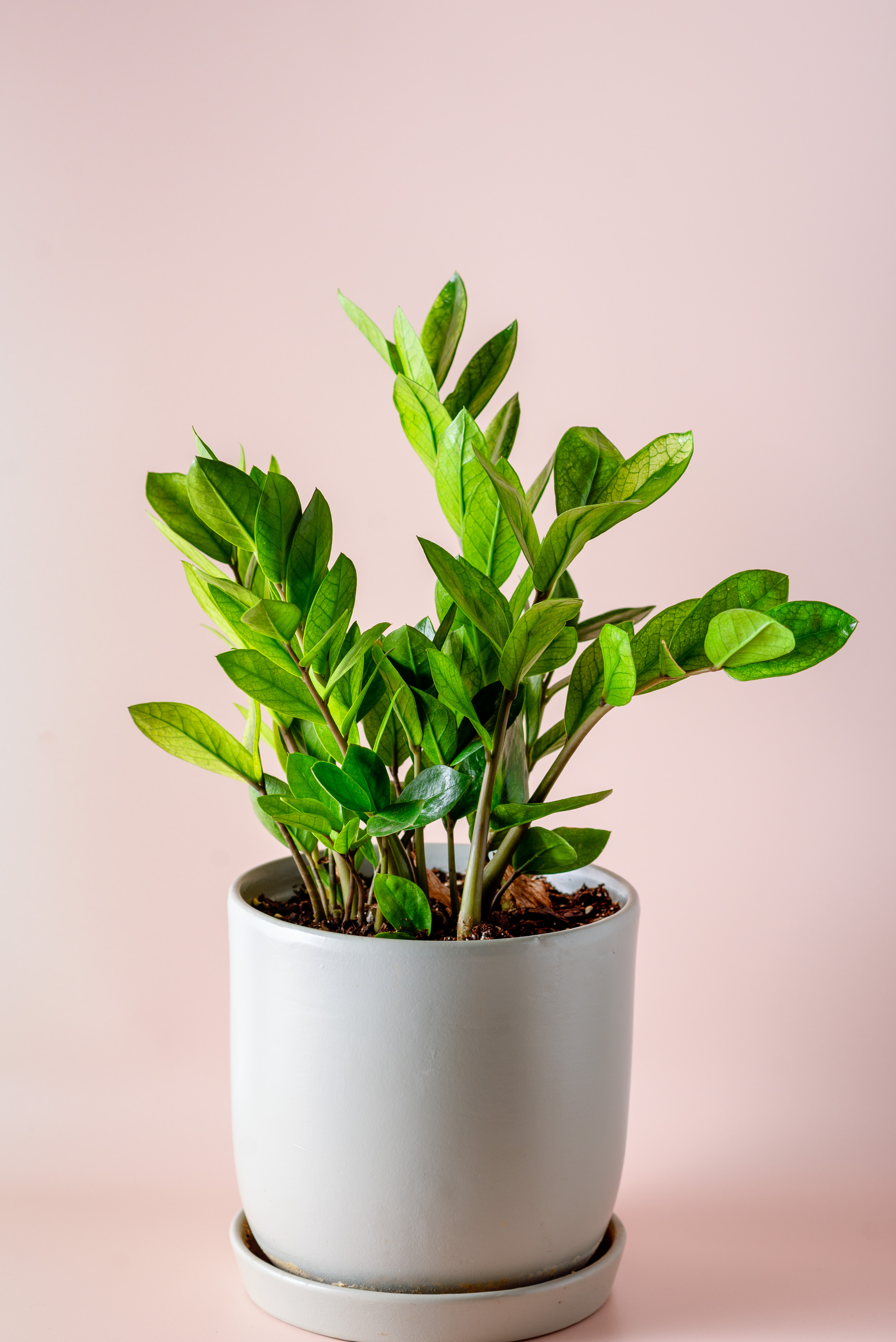
Zamioculcas zamiifolia 'Chameleon'

- Zamioculcas zamiifolia 'HANSOTI13,' commercially known as 'Zenzi'
- Zamioculcas zamiifolia 'Dowon,' commercially known as 'Raven', is licensed by Costa Farms.
- Zamioculcas zamiifolia 'Super Nova'
- Zamioculcas zamiifolia 'Chameleon'

=== Temperature ===
It may survive outdoors as long as the temperature does not fall below around 15 °C (60 °F); though best growth is between 18 and 26 °C (64 and 79 °F) while high temperatures give an increase in leaf production. In temperate regions, it is grown as a houseplant. Overwatering may destroy this plant through tuber rot. Bright, indirect light is best. Some sun will be tolerated.

=== Propagation ===
Zamioculcas zamiifolia may be propagated by leaf cuttings: typically, the lower ends of detached leaves are inserted into a moist, gritty growing medium, and the pot is enclosed in a polythene bag. Though the leaves may well decay, succulent bulb-like structures should form in the bag, and these may be potted up to produce new plants. The process may take upwards of one year. The plant can also be propagated by division.

=== Light ===
Due to its strong green leaves, it is especially suitable for open, bright rooms. When grown indoors, the plant prefers bright indirect light but will tolerate low light conditions. However, lower light is not optimal for an extended period of time. Insufficient amounts of sunlight can result in leaves lengthening and/or falling off, yellowing (chlorosis), and generally uneven or disproportionate growth as the plant stretches towards a light source. When grown outdoors, Zamioculcas zamiifolia prefers part shade to full shade.

=== Soil ===
The substrate used must be well-drained and contain nutrients. It can be composed of a mixture of tanned ox manure, washed river sand and red earth (1:1:1). For indoor plants, use a well-drained potting soil mix.

=== Water ===
Zamioculcas zamiifolia contains 91% water in the leaves, and 95% water in the petioles. It has an individual leaf longevity of at least six months, which may be the reason it can survive extremely well under interior low light levels for four months without water. Zamioculcas zamiifolia roots are rhizomatous and have the ability to store moisture, thus aiding the plants in their drought resistance. The plants like regular waterings, but the soil should be allowed to dry out between waterings.

=== Usage in traditional medicine ===
Though little information is available, Z. zamiifolia is apparently used medicinally in the Mulanje District of Malawi and in the East Usambara mountains of Tanzania where juice from the leaves is used to treat earache.

In Tanzania, a poultice of bruised plant material from Z. zamiifolia is used as a treatment for the inflammatory condition known as "mshipa".

Roots from Z. zamiifolia are used as a local application to treat ulceration by the Sukuma people in north-western Tanzania.

== Chemistry ==
=== Phytochemicals ===
Several compounds have been isolated from Zamioculcas zamiifolia. The petioles contain rosmarinic acid, protocatechuic aldehyde, (E)-caffeic acid and (E)- and (Z)-caffeic acid methyl ester. The rare natural products (3R,4S,5S)-2,3,4,5-tetrahydroxytetrahydro-2 H-pyran-2-carboxylic acid and apigenin 6-C-(6″-(3-hydroxy-3-methyl-glutaroyl)-ß-glucopyranoside) occur in the leaves.

=== Toxicity ===
Zamioculcas zamiifolia is part of the family Araceae, which is known to contain cyanogenic glycosides, calcium oxalates and perhaps alkaloids. A toxicological experiment using brine shrimp as a lethality assay did not indicate lethality to the shrimp.

=== Air purification ===
A study demonstrated that, in a laboratory setting, the plant is able to remove volatile organic compounds in the following order of effectiveness: benzene, toluene, ethylbenzene and xylene at a molar flux of around 0.01 mol/(m^{2} day). The study stated that any effectiveness on indoor environments is inconclusive.
