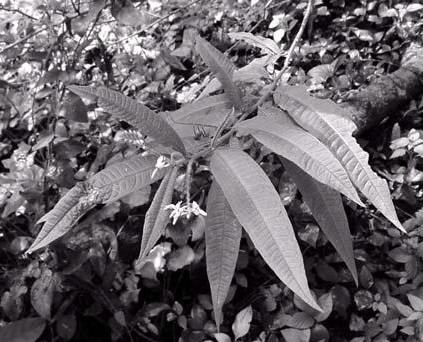

Conservation status
- Critically Endangered (IUCN 2.3)

Scientific classification
- Kingdom: Plantae
- Clade: Tracheophytes
- Clade: Angiosperms
- Clade: Eudicots
- Clade: Asterids
- Order: Solanales
- Family: Solanaceae
- Genus: Solanum
- Species: S. ensifolium

Binomial name
- Solanum ensifolium Dunal

Synonyms
- See text

= Solanum ensifolium =

Species of plant

Solanum ensifolium is a species of plant in the family Solanaceae endemic to Puerto Rico. Commonly known as erubia, it is nearly extinct due to habitat loss.

Synonyms

- Solanum drymophilum O.E.Schulz
- Solanum longifolium Pav. ex Dunal

Solanum congestiflorum var. longifolium is S. crispum
Solanum longifolium of Sessé & Mociño actually refers to the S. muricatum of Aiton.
Solanum longifolium of Dunal is Solanum subinerme.
Solanum nudum var. longifolium refers to S. sieberi

== Footnotes ==
- Solanaceae Source (20 November 2013). "Solanum ensifolium".
- World Conservation Monitoring Centre (1998). "Solanum drymophilum". IUCN Red List of Threatened Species. 1998 e.T30962A9596059. doi:10.2305/IUCN.UK.1998.RLTS.T30962A9596059.en.
