= This Is What Makes Us =

Studio album by Foxface
- Released: 5 November 2007
- Recorded: Chem 19, Hamilton; Jan-Feb 2007
- Genre: Indie rock, indie folk folk rock
- Length: 33:32
- Label: Gargleblast Records
- Producer: Andy Miller, Foxface

Professional ratings
Review scores
Source	Rating
The List	4/5 stars
The Scotsman	4/5 stars

This Is What Makes Us is the debut studio album by Scottish indie rock band Foxface. It was released on 5 November 2007 on Gargleblast Records.

The album was produced by Andy Miller and features guest performances from folk musicians John McCusker and Andy Cutting.

== Critical reception ==
The Scotsman called the album "a dynamic debut," writing that it fashions "an idiosyncratic link between folk influences, pop melodies and more strident rock'n'roll elements."

== Track listing ==
All songs written by Foxface

1. "Monster Seas"
2. "The Cold South"
3. "Across to Texa"
4. "We Can't Afford to Go"
5. "Winners/Losers"
6. "Face Looks Familiar"
7. "Line and Hand"
8. "Honour and Promotion"
9. "Last Waltz"
10. "Dragstrip"
11. "What Do You Believe In?"

== Personnel ==
- Michael Angus - vocals, guitar, production, artwork
- D. John Ferguson - drums, accordion, production, artwork
- Jenny Bell - bass, vocals, production, artwork
- John McCusker - fiddle ("We Can't Afford to Go", "Dragstrip")
- Andy Cutting - diatonic accordion ("Honour and Promotion", "Dragstrip")
- Andy Miller - production, recording
- Kenny McLeod - mastering
- Charlie Blackledge - photograph
