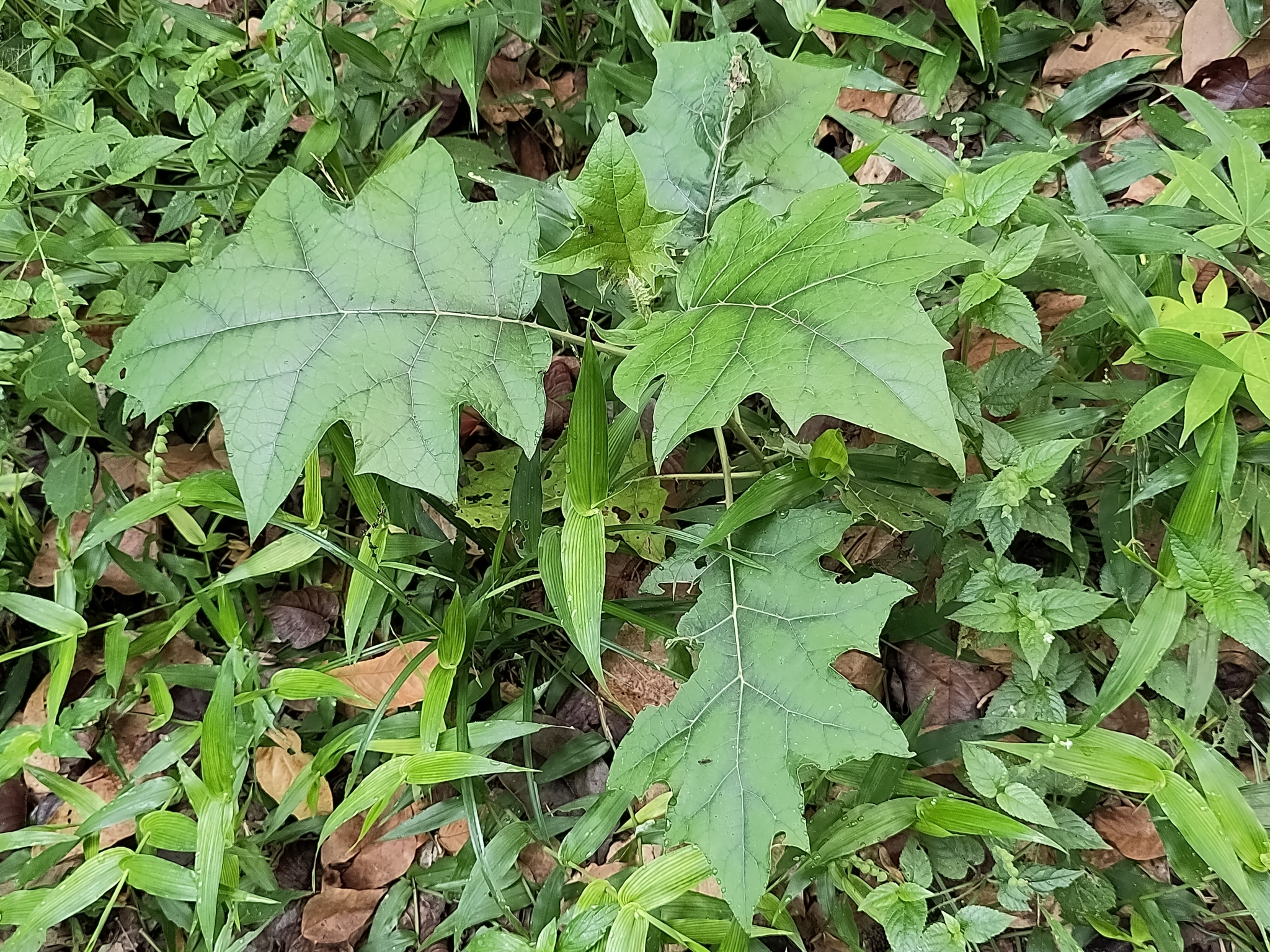

Scientific classification
- Kingdom: Plantae
- Clade: Tracheophytes
- Clade: Angiosperms
- Clade: Eudicots
- Clade: Asterids
- Order: Solanales
- Family: Solanaceae
- Genus: Solanum
- Species: S. stramoniifolium

Binomial name
- Solanum stramoniifolium Jacq.

= Solanum stramoniifolium =

Species of plant

Solanum stramoniifolium is a species of flowering plant from the genus Solanum. The species was originally described by Nikolaus Joseph von Jacquin in 1781.

== Description ==
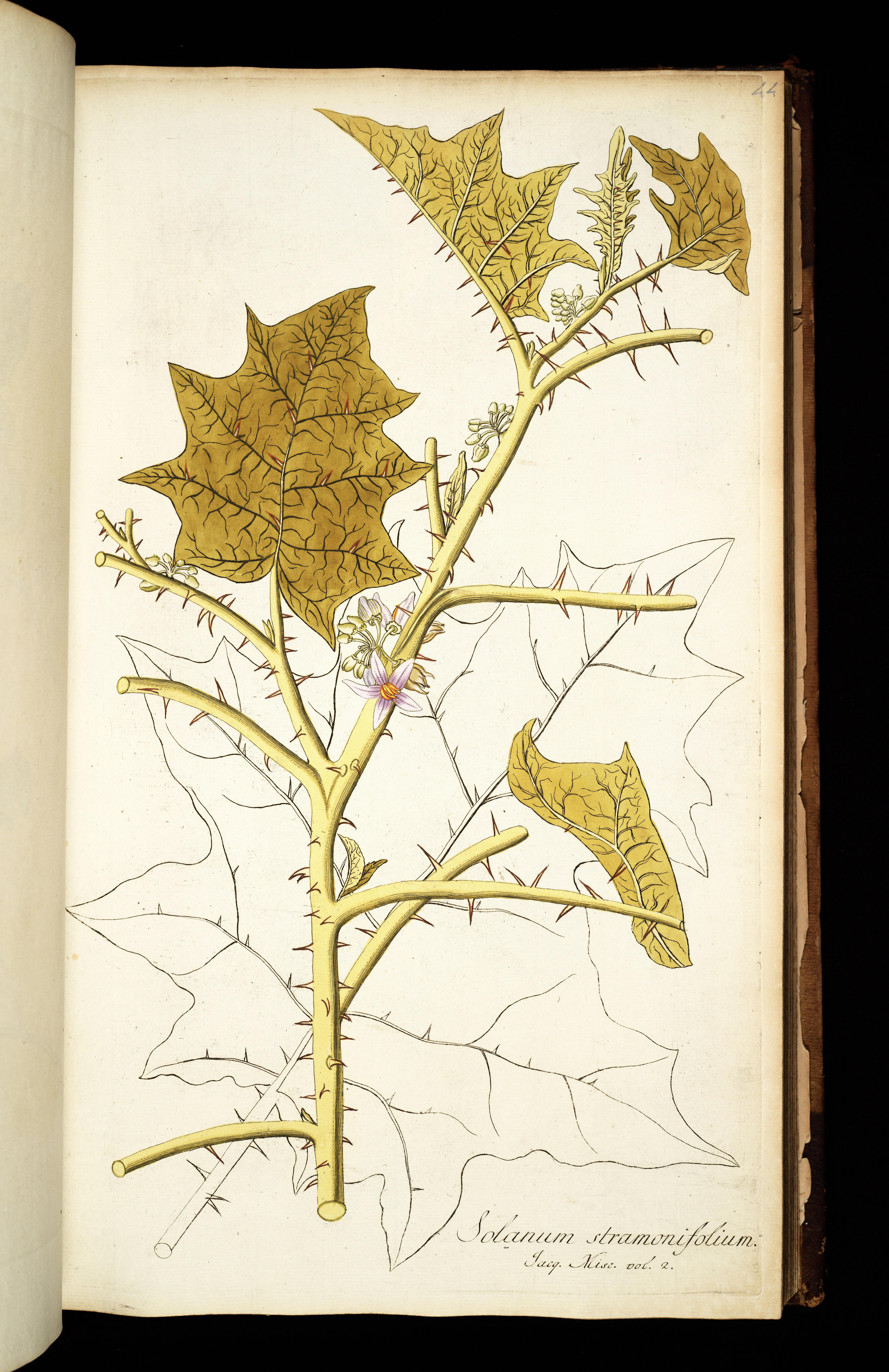
Drawing from the original description.

This species is a suffrutescent herb, common in disturbed low-lands of the northern part of South America. The leaves closely resembles those of Solanum hirtum. It is shrub that can grow up to 2 m in height.

== Interactions ==
The plants are frequently visited by bees, which is essential for the pollination of the species. However the plants do not offer nectar, so the bees are attracted by the abundance of pollen.

== Taxonomy ==
S. stramoniifolium is part of the genus Solanum, which consists of approximately 2000 species.

== Edibility ==
Many species within the Solanum genus are considered edible. There has been successful efforts to domesticate the S. stramoniifolium. The yellow/red fruits are suggested to be edible.
