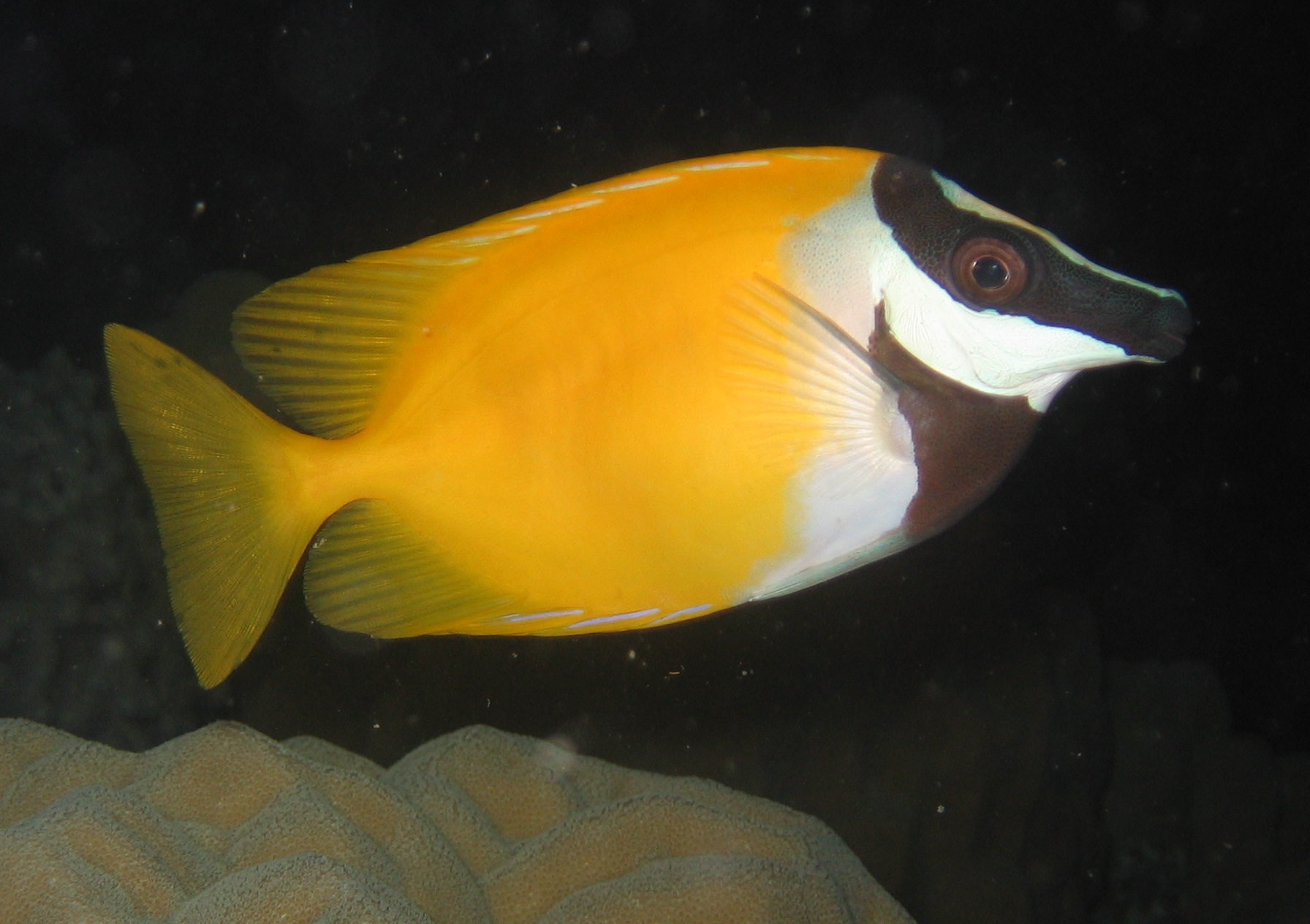
- Adult, day colour

Conservation status
- Least Concern (IUCN 3.1)

Scientific classification
- Kingdom: Animalia
- Phylum: Chordata
- Class: Actinopterygii
- Order: Acanthuriformes
- Family: Siganidae
- Genus: Siganus
- Species: S. vulpinus

Binomial name
- Siganus vulpinus (Schlegel & S. Müller, 1845)

Synonyms
- Amphacanthus vulpinus Schlegel & Müller, 1845; Lo vulpinus (Schlegel & Müller, 1845); Teuthis vulpina (Schlegel & Müller, 1845); Teuthis vulpinus (Schlegel & Müller, 1845); Teuthis tubulosa Gronow, 1854

= Foxface rabbitfish =

Species of fish

The foxface rabbitfish (Siganus vulpinus), also known as the foxface, black-face rabbit fish, badger fish or the common foxface is a species of marine ray-finned fish, a rabbitfish belonging to the family Siganidae. It is found in the Indian and Pacific Oceans. It can be found in the aquarium trade.

== Taxonomy ==
The foxface rabbitfish was first formally described as Amphacanthus vulpinus in 1845 by the German zoologists Hermann Schlegel & Salomon Müller with the type locality given as Ternate Island one of the Molucca Islands in Indonesia. The blotched foxface (S. unimaculatus) differs from S. vulpinus in possessing a large black spot below the soft-rayed part of the dorsal fin. It is sympatric and not phylogenetically distinct, and though these two might be recently evolved species, they may be just colour morphs and should arguably to be united under the scientific name S. vulpinus. The specific name vulpinus means "fox-like", Schlegel and Müller did not explain what this alluded to but it is thought to be the pointed snout.

== Description ==
The foxface rabbitfish has a compressed body which has a depth which fits into its standard length 1.9 to 2.4 times. The dorsal profile of the head is steep to the rear of the eye and there is an indentation between the eyes and a tubular snout. The caudal fin is weakly forked. There is a procumbent spine in the nape to the front of the dorsal fin. Like all rabbitfishes, the dorsal fin has 13 spines and 10 soft rays while the anal fin has 7 spines and 9 soft rays. The fin spines hold venom glands. This species attains a maximum total length of 25 cm (9.8 in), although 20 cm (7.9 in) is more typical. The main colour on this rabbitfish is vivid yellow with white on the head and front part of the body, however foxfaces can camouflage when experiencing threat, quickly changing colour to a dark brown. There is a black band running backwards from the mouth through the eye to the start of the dorsal fin and there is a black area on the breast that runs upwards to just above the base of the pectoral-fin, tapering as it does so.

== Distribution and habitat ==
The foxface rabbitfish occurs in the far eastern Indian Ocean and in the western Pacific from Indonesia to the Marshall and Gilbert Islands north as far as Taiwan and south to New Caledonia and Australia. In Australia it is found from Western Australia on the northern reefs and offshore reefs, at Ashmore Reef in the Timor Sea, and on the east coast in Queensland from the northern Great Barrier Reef to the Capricorn Islands. It has been recorded as deep as 30 m (98 ft). This species lives in lagoons and seaward reefs where there is a rich growth of corals.

== Biology ==
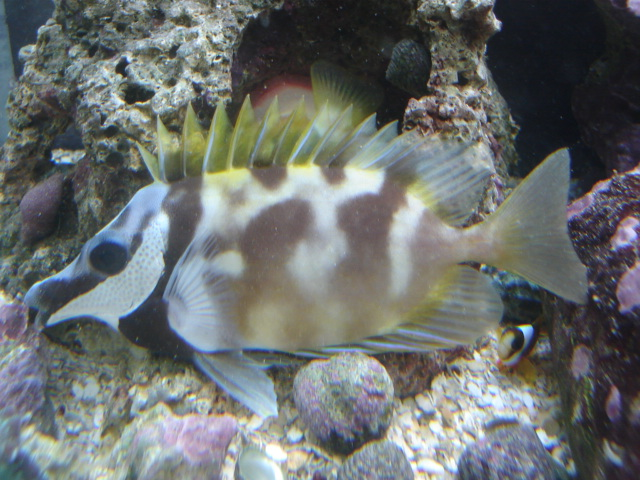
During nighttime or when stressed the foxface rabbitfish changes to a duller mottled pattern

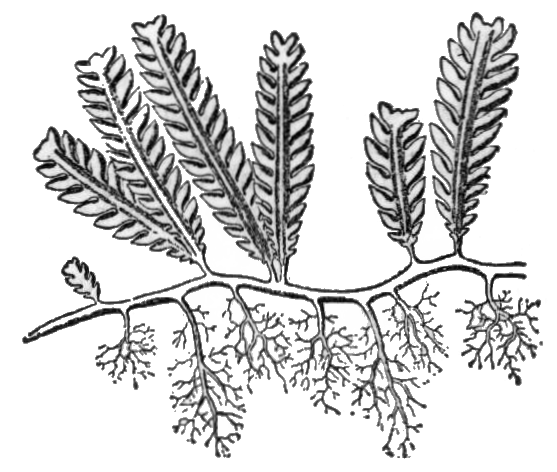
Caulerpa crassifolia is a popular food of the foxface rabbitfish.

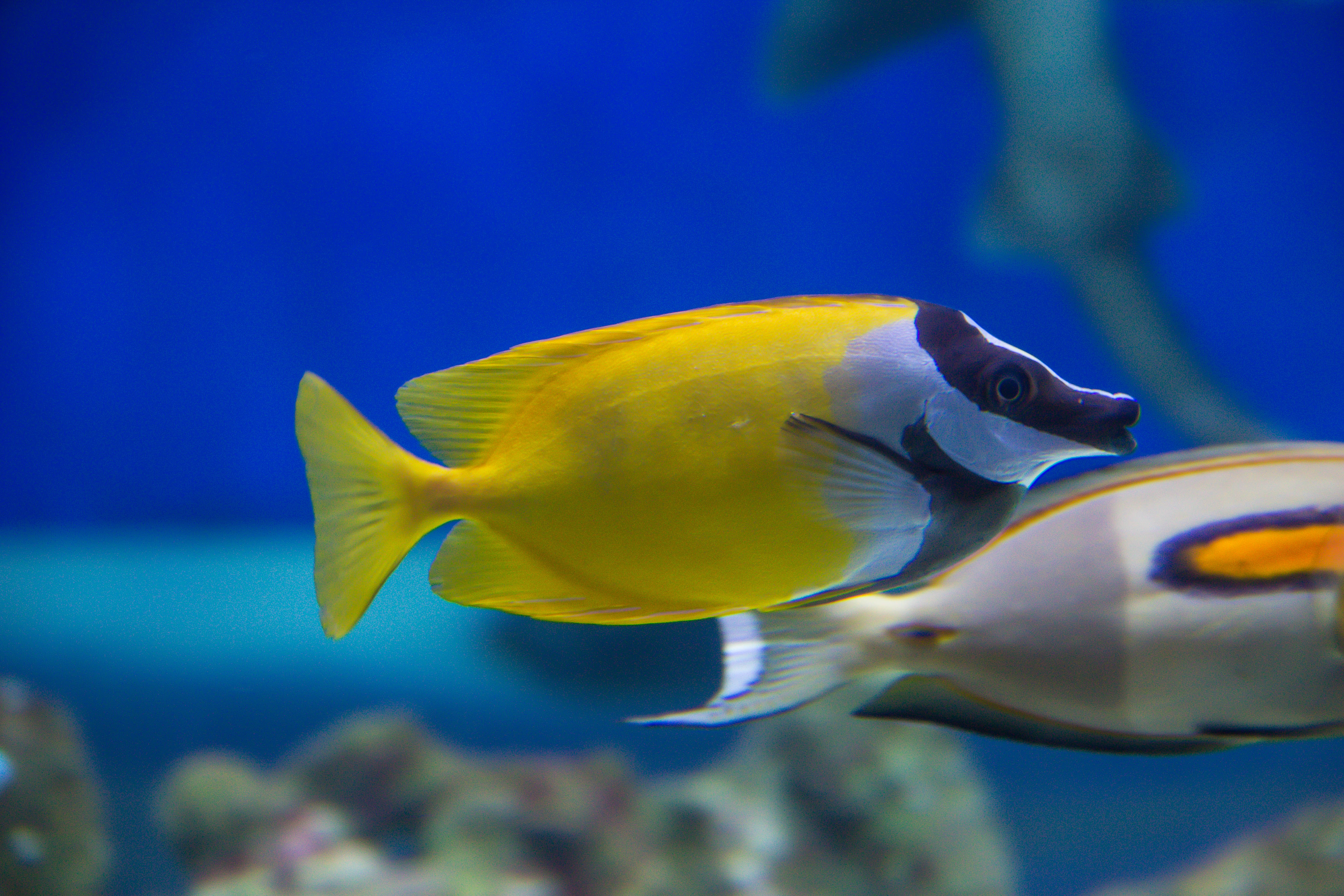

The foxface rabbitfish is omnivorous, eating mostly algae and zooplankton. They may be territorial, adults are normally found as either solitary individuals or in pairs and are associated with branching Acropora corals. Juveniles and subadults may sometimes form large schools, feeding on algae growing on the bases of Acropora corals. This species produces venom in the spines of its fins. In a study of the venom of a congener it was found that rabbitfish venom was similar to the venom of stonefishes.

== Utilisation ==
The foxface rabbitfish appears in the aquarium trade. No statistics are kept for the catch and in some areas this species appears in mixed catches of reef fish, caught by spearfishing.
