= Methyl caffeate =

- Chemical structure of methyl caffeate

Names
- Preferred IUPAC name Methyl (2E)-3-(3,4-dihydroxyphenyl)prop-2-enoate
- Other names Caffeic acid methyl ester methylcaffeate Methyl 3,4-dihydroxycinnamate

Identifiers
CAS Number	3843-74-1
3D model (JSmol)	Interactive image
ChemSpider	600455
ECHA InfoCard	100.236.052
PubChem CID	689075
UNII	N79173B9HF
CompTox Dashboard (EPA)	DTXSID401030290
- InChI: InChI=1S/C10H10O4/c1-14-10(13)5-3-7-2-4-8(11)9(12)6-7/h2-6,11-12H,1H3/b5-3+ Key: OCNYGKNIVPVPPX-HWKANZROSA-N; InChI=1/C10H10O4/c1-14-10(13)5-3-7-2-4-8(11)9(12)6-7/h2-6,11-12H,1H3/b5-3+ Key: OCNYGKNIVPVPPX-HWKANZROBE
- SMILES: COC(=O)/C=C/C1=CC(=C(C=C1)O)O

Properties
Chemical formula	C_{10}H_{10}O_{4}
Molar mass	194.186 g·mol^{−1}

Related compounds
Related compounds	Caffeic acid, Ethyl caffeate
- Except where otherwise noted, data are given for materials in their standard state (at 25 °C [77 °F], 100 kPa). Infobox references

Methyl caffeate is an ester of caffeic acid, a naturally occurring phenolic compound. It is an α-glucosidase inhibitor. Its physical form is a powder.

== Natural occurrences ==
Methyl caffeate can be found in the fruit of Solanum torvum.

== Health effect ==
Methyl caffeate shows an antidiabetic effect in streptozotocin-induced diabetic rats.
