= Foxface (band) =

Scottish rock band

- Origin: Glasgow, Scotland
- Genres: Indie folk Indie rock
- Years active: 2003–2009
- Label: Gargleblast
- Past members: Michael Angus; John Ferguson; Jenny Bell; Andrew Smith

Foxface were a Glasgow-based Scottish rock band featuring Michael Angus (vocals, guitar), John Ferguson (drums, accordion, banjo, mandolin) and Jenny Bell (bass, vocals).

== History ==
Foxface started life as the solo acoustic project of Michael Angus, previously of Peeps into Fairyland. Along the way he was joined by John Ferguson, also ex-Peeps into Fairyland, before the lineup was completed by Jenny Bell.

After disbanding in 2009, Michael Angus went on to form Make Love with David Gow (Sons and Daughters) and Colin Kearney (Eska).

== Members ==
- Michael Angus – Vocals, guitar
- John Ferguson – Drums, accordion, banjo, mandolin
- Jenny Bell – Bass, vocals
- Andrew Smith (Laeto) – Guitar

== Discography ==
=== Albums ===
- This Is What Makes Us (2007)

=== EPs ===
- Foxface EP (2003)

=== Singles ===
- Monster Seas / Across To Texa 7" (2006)
