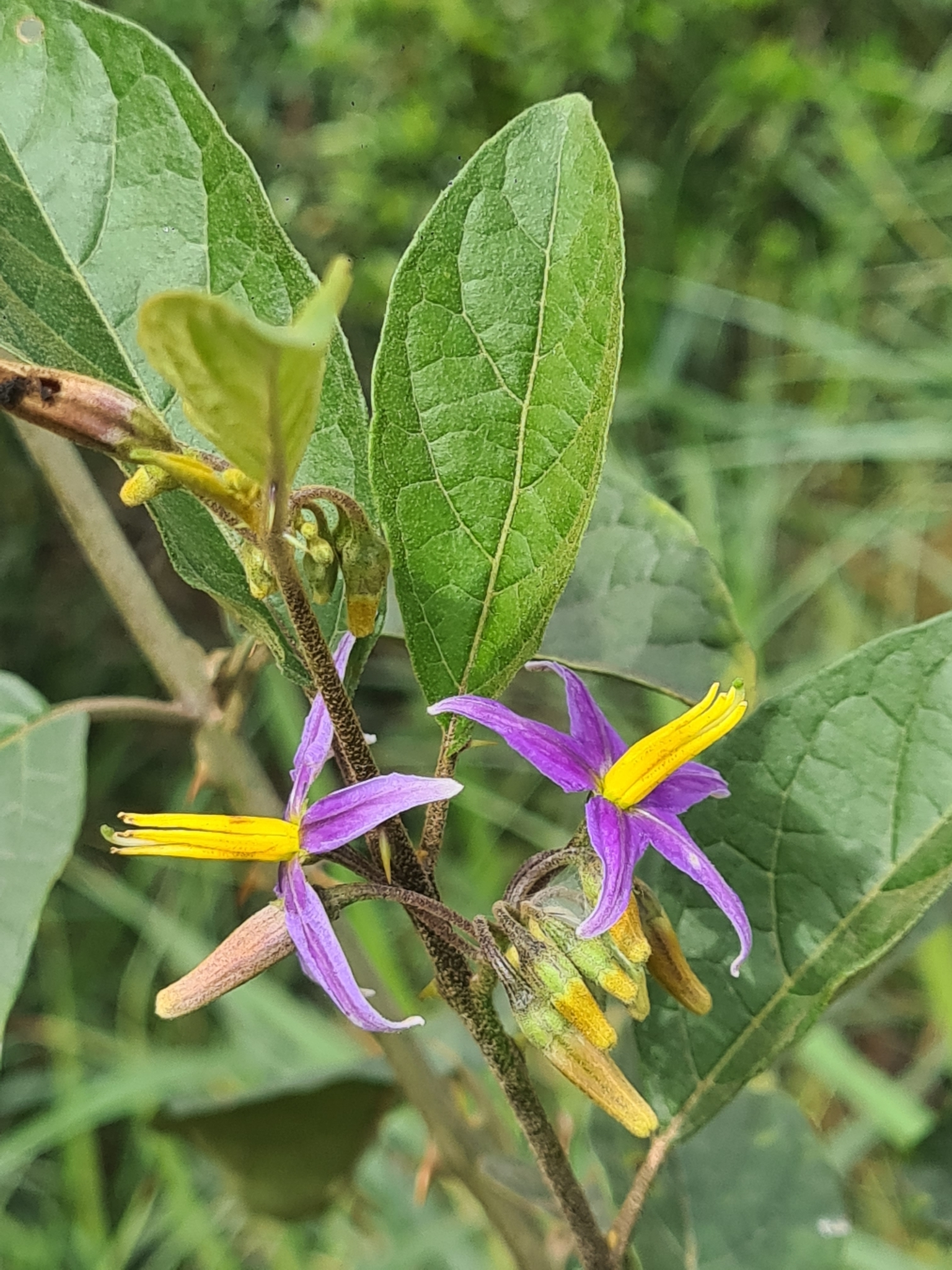

Scientific classification
- Kingdom: Plantae
- Clade: Tracheophytes
- Clade: Angiosperms
- Clade: Eudicots
- Clade: Asterids
- Order: Solanales
- Family: Solanaceae
- Genus: Solanum
- Species: S. subinerme

Binomial name
- Solanum subinerme Jacq.

= Solanum subinerme =

Species of plant

Solanum subinerme is a species of flowering plant from the genus Solanum. The species was originally described by Nikolaus Joseph von Jacquin.

== Description ==
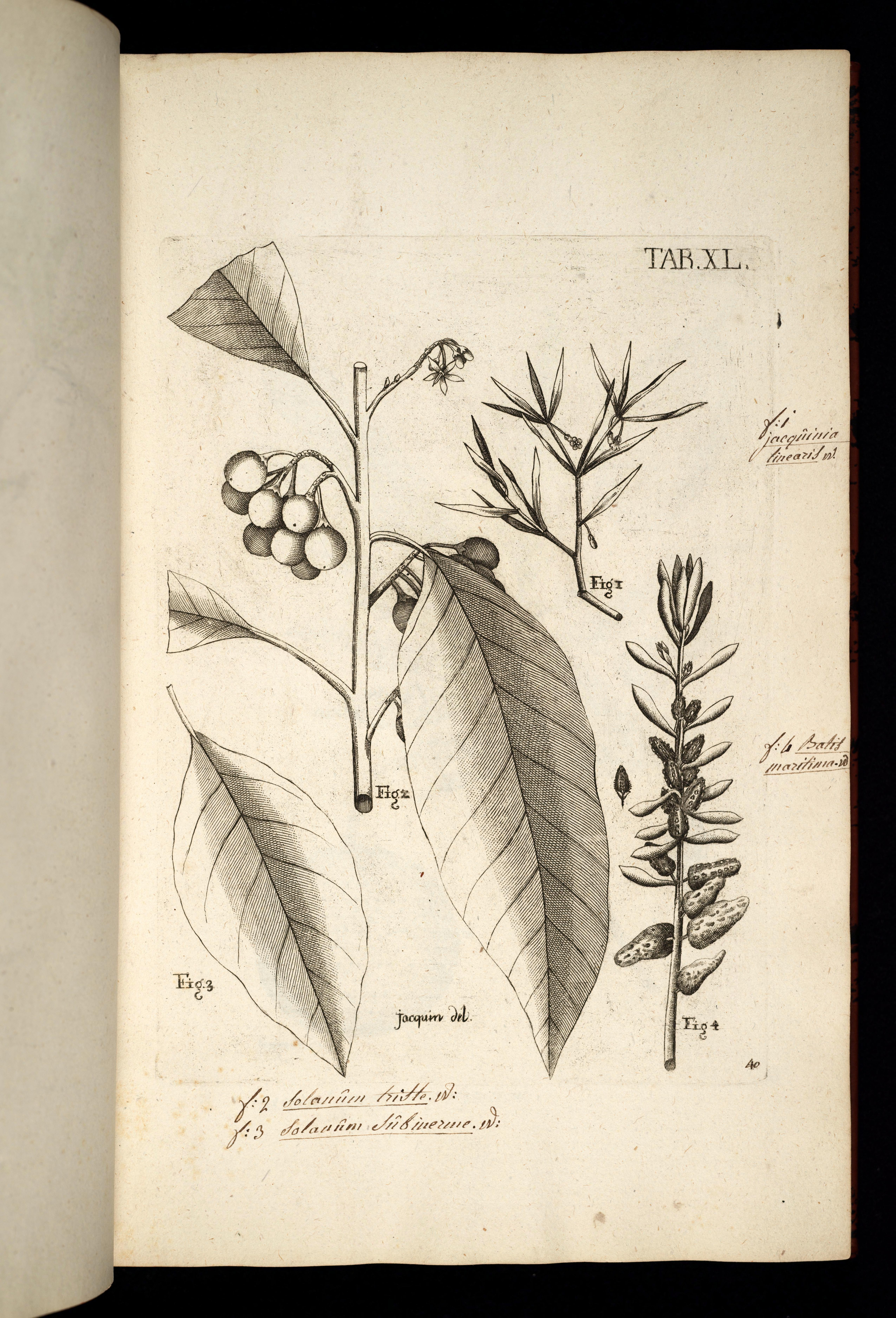
Original drawing of the species

Solanum subinerme is a flowering shrub that can grow up to 3 meters in height. It has purple flowers and berrylike fruit.

== Range ==
Solanum subinerme has been observed and documented in the northern part of South America and the Caribbean.

== Ecology ==
It has been suggested that cattle ingesting Solanum subinerme may experience cerebellar degeneration. The main clinical signs are periodic crises with loss of balance, falls, opisthotonus, and nystagmus.

== Look-a-likes ==
Solanum subinerme looks similar to Solanum junctum and Solanum poinsettiifolium. S. subinerme has larger flowers, longer cauline prickles, and often has long straight prickles on the adaxial leaf surface that are lacking in Solanum junctum. Solanum poinsettiifolium has fewer spines, dense white tomentum on the abaxial leaf surfaces, stout unbranched inflorescences, and more extensive interpetalar corolla tissue than Solanum junctum.
