= Popcaan discography =

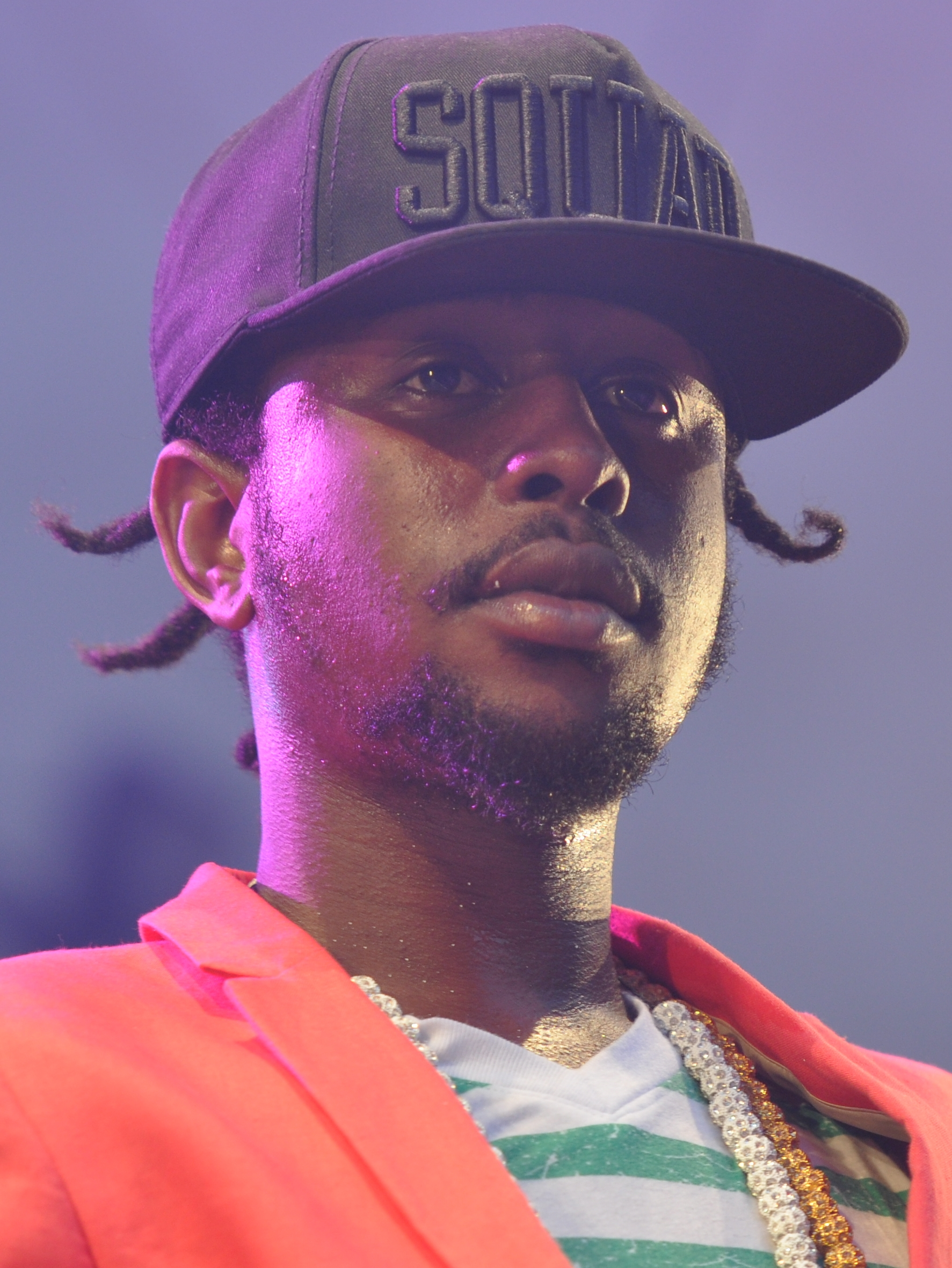
- Popcaan performing at Summerjam in 2013
- Studio albums: 5
- EPs: 5
- Singles: 151
- Music videos: 26
- Mixtapes: 3

The discography of Jamaican singer Popcaan consists of five studio albums, three mixtapes, five extended plays, 151 singles, 15 singles as a featured artist, and 26 music videos.

== Studio albums ==
List of studio albums, with selected chart positions
Title	Album details	Peak chart positions					
Title	Album details	CAN	BEL (FL)	NLD	SWI	US	US Reggae
Bay Badness	Released: 2012; Label: TJ Records; Format: Digital download	—	—	—	—	—	—
Where We Come From	Released: 10 June 2014; Label: Mixpak; Format: CD, digital download, streaming	—	—	—	—	— (Note: Where We Come From did not enter the US Billboard 200, but did peak at number 21 on the Heatseekers Albums chart.)	2
Forever	Released: 20 July 2018; Label: Mixpak; Format: CD, digital download, streaming	72	195	139	100	171	2
Fixtape	Released: 7 August 2020; Label: OVO Sound; Format: CD, digital download, streaming	15	—	—	—	94	2
Great Is He	Released: 27 January 2023; Label: OVO Sound; Format: Digital download, streaming	—	—	—	—	—	3

== Mixtapes ==
Title	Mixtape details
Hot Skull, Fry Yiy, Boil Brainz	Released: 2010; Format: Digital download; Label: N/A
Yiy Change	Released: 2012; Format: Digital download; Label: N/A
Vanquish	Released: 20 December 2019; Format: Digital download, streaming; Label: OVO Sound

== Extended plays ==
Title	EP details
When Mi Party	Released: 26 June 2012; Format: Digital download, streaming; Label: TJ Record
Only Man She Want	Released: 2 October 2012; Format: Digital download, streaming; Label: Tad's Record
Unruly (with Anju Blaxx)	Released: 4 October 2012; Format: Digital download, streaming; Label: UIM Records
Link Up (with Preme)	Released: 16 October 2020; Format: Digital download, streaming; Label: Rep Ups Entertainment, Empire
Gyalentine's	Released: 14 February 2021; Format: Digital download, streaming; Label: Unruly Entertainment

== Singles ==
=== As lead artist ===
Title	Year	Peak chart positions					Certifications	Album
Title	Year	CAN	IRE	NZ Hot	UK	US Bub.	Certifications	Album
"Gangster City"	2010	—	—	—	—	—		Non-album singles
"Way Up" (with Anju Blaxx)	2011	—	—	—	—	—		Non-album singles
"Only Man She Want"	2011	—	—	—	—	—		Only Man She Want
"Raving"	2011	—	—	—	—	—		Only Man She Want
"Naughty Girl" (with Anju Blaxx)	2011	—	—	—	—	—		Only Man She Want
"Party Shot (Raving, Pt.2)"	2011	—	—	—	—	—		When Mi Party
"No Yes Man"	2011	—	—	—	—	—		When Mi Party
"Get Gyal Easy"	2012	—	—	—	—	—		Non-album singles
"Kick Dem fe Fun"	2012	—	—	—	—	—		Non-album singles
"Clean"	2012	—	—	—	—	—		When Mi Party
"Nuh Link with Enemy"	2012	—	—	—	—	—		Non-album single
"Fry Yiy" (with Anju Blaxx)	2012	—	—	—	—	—		Unruly
"Badmind a Kill Dem"	2012	—	—	—	—	—		Non-album singles
"She a Gwan Good (Medal)"	2012	—	—	—	—	—		Non-album singles
"Mi Babv Dat" (with Anju Blaxx)	2012	—	—	—	—	—		Unruly
"Can't Believe It"	2012	—	—	—	—	—		Non-album singles
"Food Haffi Run"	2012	—	—	—	—	—		Non-album singles
"Youth Affi Born"	2012	—	—	—	—	—		Non-album singles
"Kill Bwoy Quick"	2012	—	—	—	—	—		Non-album singles
"Party Non Stop"	2012	—	—	—	—	—		Non-album singles
"Dem Nuh Worry Me"	2012	—	—	—	—	—		Non-album singles
"Jingle Bell"	2012	—	—	—	—	—		Non-album singles
"Road Hafi Tek On"	2012	—	—	—	—	—		Non-album singles
"Bad Any Weh"	2012	—	—	—	—	—		Non-album singles
"Lord Protect Them"	2013	—	—	—	—	—		Non-album singles
"Unruly Gal"	2013	—	—	—	—	—		Non-album singles
"Unruly Rave"	2013	—	—	—	—	—		Non-album singles
"Your My Baby"	2013	—	—	—	—	—		Non-album singles
"Born Bad"	2013	—	—	—	—	—		Non-album singles
"Nuh Ramp" (with Anju Blaxx)	2013	—	—	—	—	—		Non-album singles
"Every Gyal a Fi We"	2013	—	—	—	—	—		Non-album singles
"Neva Fraid"	2014	—	—	—	—	—		Non-album singles
"Only Jah Know" (with Notnice)	2014	—	—	—	—	—		Non-album singles
"Love Yuh Bad"	2014	—	—	—	—	—		Non-album singles
"Tie Mi" (with Anju Blaxx)	2014	—	—	—	—	—		Non-album singles
"Unruly Party"	2014	—	—	—	—	—		Non-album singles
"Fix Things"	2014	—	—	—	—	—		Non-album singles
"Dream"	2015	—	—	—	—	—		Non-album singles
"Dem a Knock Off (Killy Killy)"	2015	—	—	—	—	—		Non-album singles
"Junction"	2015	—	—	—	—	—		Non-album singles
"Mad Me"	2015	—	—	—	—	—		Non-album singles
"Mama Pray fa Me"	2015	—	—	—	—	—		Non-album singles
"Rup Rup (Bad Inna Real Life)"	2015	—	—	—	—	—		Non-album singles
"Slap One"	2015	—	—	—	—	—		Non-album singles
"Unruly Prayer"	2015	—	—	—	—	—		Non-album singles
"Inna Yuh Belly"	2015	—	—	—	—	—		Non-album singles
"Testify"	2015	—	—	—	—	—		Non-album singles
"My God"	2015	—	—	—	—	—		Non-album singles
"Gal Farm"	2015	—	—	—	—	—		Non-album singles
"Weed Is My Best Friend"	2015	—	—	—	—	—		Non-album singles
"God Alone" (with Notnice)	2015	—	—	—	—	—		Non-album singles
"Homemade" (with Notnice)	2015	—	—	—	—	—		Non-album singles
"Fiesty Chat"	2016	—	—	—	—	—		Non-album singles
"High All Day" with (Notnice)	2016	—	—	—	—	—		Non-album singles
"Feel Good" with (Notnice)	2016	—	—	—	—	—		Non-album singles
"Wicked Man Thing"	2016	—	—	—	—	—		Non-album singles
"Never Get Pick" (featuring Versatile)	2016	—	—	—	—	—		Non-album singles
"Kill Badmind" (with Anju Blaxx)	2016	—	—	—	—	—		Non-album singles
"Never Sober"	2016	—	—	—	—	—		Non-album singles
"So Lie"	2016	—	—	—	—	—		Non-album singles
"VVIP"	2016	—	—	—	—	—		Non-album singles
"Ova Dweet"	2016	—	—	—	—	—		Non-album singles
"Warrior"	2016	—	—	—	—	—		Non-album singles
"Man a Murdera"	2016	—	—	—	—	—		Non-album singles
"Killy Killy"	2016	—	—	—	—	—		Non-album singles
"World Cup" with (Notnice)	2016	—	—	—	—	—		Non-album singles
"Ky Kwengko" with (Dosa Medicine)	2016	—	—	—	—	—		Non-album singles
"Bad Ah Yard"	2016	—	—	—	—	—		Non-album singles
"Dutty Dread" with (Notnice)	2016	—	—	—	—	—		Non-album singles
"Up Top"	2016	—	—	—	—	—		Non-album singles
"Nah Idle"	2016	—	—	—	—	—		Non-album singles
"Mi Unruly"	2016	—	—	—	—	—		Non-album singles
"Fully Auto"	2016	—	—	—	—	—		Non-album singles
"Stay Up" with (Notnice)	2016	—	—	—	—	—		Non-album singles
"New Level" with (Notnice)	2016	—	—	—	—	—		Non-album singles
"Fresh Jordan" (with (Anju Blaxx)	2016	—	—	—	—	—		Non-album singles
"Christmas Gift" with (Notnice)	2016	—	—	—	—	—		Non-album singles
"Unruly King"	2017	—	—	—	—	—		Non-album singles
"It Real"	2017	—	—	—	—	—		Non-album singles
"Jungle Justice"	2017	—	—	—	—	—		Non-album singles
"In Love" with (Notnice)	2017	—	—	—	—	—		Non-album singles
"Stronger Now" with (Notnice)	2017	—	—	—	—	—		Non-album singles
"Real Thugz"	2017	—	—	—	—	—		Non-album singles
"My Story" with (Davido)	2017	—	—	—	—	—		Non-album singles
"Still Feel Good" with (Notnice)	2017	—	—	—	—	—		Non-album singles
"Up Forever"	2017	—	—	—	—	—		Non-album singles
"El Chapo" with (Notnice)	2017	—	—	—	—	—		Non-album singles
"Anytime"	2017	—	—	—	—	—		Non-album singles
"Addicted"	2017	—	—	—	—	—		Non-album singles
"Family"	2017	—	—	—	—	—		Non-album singles
"Dem Wah Fi Know"	2017	—	—	—	—	—		Non-album singles
"Rich & Bad"	2017	—	—	—	—	—		Non-album singles
"New Money" with (Louie Vito)	2017	—	—	—	—	—		Non-album singles
"Bullet Proof"	2018	—	—	—	—	—		Non-album singles
"Weed Settingz" with (Louie Vito)	2018	—	—	—	—	—		Non-album singles
"My Type"	2018	—	—	—	—	—	BPI: Silver	Non-album singles
"Inviolable"	2018	—	—	—	—	—		Non-album singles
"Steamy" with (Jah Vinci)	2018	—	—	—	—	—		Non-album singles
"Silence"	2018	—	—	—	—	—	BPI: Silver	Non-album singles
"Best / Blessed"	2019	—	—	—	—	—		Non-album singles
"When You Wine Like That"	2019	—	—	—	—	—		Non-album singles
"V.S.O.P."	2019	—	—	—	—	—		Non-album singles
"Trigga Play" with (Louie Vito)	2019	—	—	—	—	—		Non-album singles
"Nuh Bwoy Can't Box Mi"	2019	—	—	—	—	—		Non-album singles
"ReDress" solo or with (Dunw3II)	2019	—	—	—	—	—		Non-album singles
"Unstoppable" with (Dunw3II)	2019	—	—	—	—	—		Non-album singles
"Trouble Deh Deh" with (Dunw3II)	2019	—	—	—	—	—		Non-album singles
"Level Up"	2019	—	—	—	—	—		Non-album singles
"Sicario" with (Notnice)	2019	—	—	—	—	—		Non-album singles
"Goals"	2019	—	—	—	—	—		Non-album singles
"5 Bills"	2019	—	—	—	—	—		Non-album singles
"Traumatized"	2019	—	—	—	—	—		Non-album singles
"Victoria Secret" with (Dunw3II)	2019	—	—	—	—	—		Non-album singles
"Party Business"	2019	—	—	—	—	—		Non-album singles
"Go Nana" with (Richie Stephens)	2019	—	—	—	—	—		Non-album singles
"I'm Blessed with Life"	2019	—	—	—	—	—		Non-album singles
"Baby Yuh Tight"	2019	—	—	—	—	—		Non-album singles
"New Found Love"	2019	—	—	—	—	—		Non-album singles
"Irreplaceable"	2019	—	—	—	—	—		Non-album singles
"Billions" (featuring Quada)	2019	—	—	—	—	—		Non-album singles
"Money Heist"	2019	—	—	—	—	—		Non-album singles
"2 Cups" (with Stay Flee Get Lizzy, Fredo and Tory Lanez)	2019	—	—	—	55	—	BPI: Silver	Non-album singles
"Sex on the River"	2020	—	—	—	—	—		Non-album singles
"Block Traffic"	2020	—	—	—	—	—		
"Mamakita"	2020	—	—	—	—	—		Fixtape
"Here to Stay"	2020	—	—	—	—	—		Non-album single
"Buzz"	2020	—	—	—	—	—		Fixtape
"Twist & Turn" (featuring Drake and PartyNextDoor)	2020	75	—	37	69	19	BPI: Silver; RIAA: Gold	Fixtape
"Cream" (with Frahcess One)	2020	—	—	—	—	—		Non-album singles
"Rich Symptom" (with Furnace)	2020	—	—	—	—	—		Non-album singles
"Relevant"	2021	—	—	—	—	—		Non-album singles
"Medal"	2021	—	—	—	—	—		Non-album singles
"Jah Love" (with Zamunda and Dre Island	2021	—	—	—	—	—		Non-album singles
"Win"	2021	—	—	—	—	—		Non-album singles
"Memory"	2021	—	—	—	—	—		Non-album singles
"Survivor"	2021	—	—	—	—	—		Non-album singles
"Wine All Day"	2021	—	—	—	—	—		Non-album singles
"Find Dem"	2021	—	—	—	—	—		Non-album singles
"Pool Party" (with 6n)	2021	—	—	—	—	—		Non-album singles
"Blessings" (with Bakersteez)	2021	—	—	—	—	—		Non-album singles
"Live Some Life"	2021	—	—	—	—	—		Non-album singles
"Superior" (with Anju Blaxx)	2021	—	—	—	—	—		Non-album singles
"Levels"	2021	—	—	—	—	—		Non-album singles
"El Gringo"	2021	—	—	—	—	—		Non-album singles
"Money Speak"	2021	—	—	—	—	—		Non-album singles
"Elevate" (with Imeru Tafari)	2022	—	—	—	—	—		Non-album singles
"Skeleton Cartier"	2022	—	—	—	—	—		Great Is He
"Cocaine Money"	2022	—	—	—	—	—		Non-album singles
"One Way"	2022	—	—	—	—	—		Non-album singles
"Next to Me" (featuring Toni-Ann Singh)	2022	—	—	—	—	—		Great Is He
"Set It"	2022	—	—	—	—	—		Great Is He
"We Caa Done" (featuring Drake)	2023	36	60	5	37	16		Great Is He
"Great Is He"	2023	—	—	—	—	—		Great Is He
“Tequila Shots” (featuring Fivio Foreign, Vybz Kartel, and Chronic Law)	2023	—	—	—	—	—		Great Is He
"—" denotes a recording that did not chart in that territory.

=== As featured artist ===
Song	Year	Peak chart positions									Certifications	Album
Song	Year	AUS	BEL (WA)	CAN	DEN	FRA	IRE	NED	SCO	UK	Certifications	Album
2012	"Lighters Up" (Snoop Lion featuring Popcaan)	—	—	—	—	—	—	—	—	—		
2014	"Kisses for Breakfast" (Melissa Steel featuring Popcaan)	—	—	—	—	—	—	—	15	10	BPI: Silver	
2015	"I Know There's Gonna Be (Good Times)" (Jamie xx featuring Young Thug and Popcaan)	90	85	—	—	—	—	—	—	115	BPI: Gold; RIAA: Gold; MC: Platinum; RMNZ: Gold	
2016	"I'm in Control" (AlunaGeorge featuring Popcaan)	64	32	—	32	57	60	50	35	39	BPI: Silver; RMNZ: Gold	
2016	"Should've Been Me" (Naughty Boy featuring Kyla and Popcaan)	—	—	—	—	—	61	—	47	61	BPI: Silver	
2017	"Saturnz Barz" (Gorillaz featuring Popcaan)	—	—	75	—	114	88	—	—	87	BPI: Silver	
2017	"One You Love" (Ivy Layne featuring Popcaan)	—	—	—	—	—	—	—	—	—		
2017	"Times Tickin" (Giggs featuring Popcaan)	—	—	—	—	—	—	—	—	—		
2017	"You Ain't Mine" (Kyla featuring Popcaan)	—	—	—	—	—	—	—	—	—		
2017	"Say a Prayer" (Tieks featuring Popcaan)	—	—	—	—	—	—	—	98	—		
2018	"Comfort You" (Willie XO featuring Popcaan)	—	—	—	—	—	—	—	—	100		
2019	"Risky" (Davido featuring Popcaan)	—	—	—	—	—	—	—	—	—	MC: Gold	
2019	"Can't Hold We Down" (Kano featuring Popcaan)	—	—	—	—	—	—	—	—	—	BPI: Silver	
2020	"Avengers" (Loski featuring Popcaan)	—	—	—	—	—	—	—	—	—		
2020	"Nobody's Love" (Remix) (Maroon 5 featuring Popcaan)	—	—	—	—	—	—	—	—	—		
2020	"Come Over" (Jorja Smith featuring Popcaan)	—	—	—	—	—	82	—	—	—	BPI: Gold	
2020	"Intercourse" (Megan Thee Stallion featuring Popcaan & Mustard)	—	—	—	—	—	—	—	—	—		
2022	"Toni-Ann Singh" (Burna Boy featuring Popcaan)	—	—	—	—	—	—	—	—	—		
2026	“Amazing Shape” (Drake featuring Popcaan)	—	—	43	—	—	—	—	—	—		

== Music videos ==
Song	Year	Director
"Dream"	2010	Roadblock Films
"Clean"	2011	Roadblock Films
"Only Man She Want"	2011	Roadblock Films
"Ravin"	2011	DJ Lee
"Party Shot"	2012	Mykal Cushnie
"Fry Yiy"	2012	Roadblock Films
"The System"	2012	Dayo
"Girls Medley"	2012	Jay Will
"Unruly Rave"	2013	Niko
"So We Do It"	2013	Andy Capper
"Violate" (featuring Samini)	2014	Highgrade Music
"Everything Nice"	2014	Jay Will
"Love Yuh Bad"	2015	Nile Saulter
"Rup Rup (Bad Inna Real Life)"	2015	Steezy
"Unruly Prayer"	2015	RD Studios
"Way Up"	2015	RD Studios
"Dem Wa Fi Know"	2015	Focus Creeps
"Ova Dweet"	2016	RD Studios
"Wicked Man Ting"	2016	Unruly Entertainment
"Please Forgive Me"	2016	Anthony Mandler
"Saturnz Barz"	2017	Jamie Hewlett
"El Chapo"	2017	RD Studios
"Wine for me"	2018	Mixpak
"Firm and Strong"	2019	Mixpak
"Silence"	2019	Mixpak
"Skeleton Cartier"	2022	Suave
