= No Shame (Lily Allen album) =

Studio album by Lily Allen
- Released: 8 June 2018
- Recorded: 2015–2018
- Studios: HOXA HQ, London (Note: Tracks 1, 5 and 12); Tileyard, London (Note: Tracks 2, 4, 6, 8, 11, 13 and 14); Mixpak, Brooklyn, New York (Note: Track 3); Zelig, London (Note: Track 7); Sunset Sound, Los Angeles (Note: Strings on track 7; track 12); Fryarcorp HQ, The Pink House, Santa Monica, California (Note: Tracks 9 and 10); Show N Prove, London (Note: Tracks 11 and 14); GenPop Laboratory, Los Angeles (Note: Track 12); Sound Factory, Los Angeles (Note: Track 12); Promises, London (Note: Track 13)
- Genres: Electropop; dancehall; electro-R&B
- Length: 51:04
- Label: Parlophone
- Producers: Lily Allen; BloodPop; Dre Skull; Fryars; Ezra Koenig; Cass Lowe; Jack Nichols-Marcy; P2J; Emre Ramazanoglu; Samuel Reinhard; Mark Ronson; Seb Chew; Show N Prove

Lily Allen chronology
Sheezus (2014)	No Shame (2018)	West End Girl (2025)

Singles from No Shame
- 1. "Trigger Bang" Released: 12 December 2017

No Shame is the fourth studio album by the English singer-songwriter Lily Allen. It was released on 8 June 2018 by Parlophone. Following the release of Sheezus (2014), Allen suffered from an identity crisis and did not connect with the music she had been creating. This was followed by a breakdown in Allen's marriage. Following Allen's divorce, she began working on new music which saw her writing about things that she had been affected by including the relationship with herself, her children, her ex-husband and substance abuse. Recording for the album began in Los Angeles in 2015 before Allen set up her own studio in London and continued recording through until 2018. The sessions featured contributions from producers such as Fryars and Mark Ronson, whilst the final track listing featured guest appearances from artists including Giggs, Burna Boy and Lady Chann.

An electropop and electro-R&B album, No Shame takes influence from pop, electro, grime and reggae and features confessional lyrics that discuss the breakdown of Allen's marriage and friendships, maternal guilt, substance abuse, along with social and political issues. Upon release No Shame was met with generally positive reviews from music critics, who praised the album's mature lyrical content and themes, Allen's artistic evolution, the composition and production. The album peaked at number eight on the UK Albums Chart, it reached the top 40 on the New Zealand and Irish charts and became Allen's fourth consecutive top 10 album in Australia. To promote the album, Allen released three singles including "Trigger Bang" and embarked on the worldwide No Shame Tour.

== Background ==
My last album didn't really feel like that, I think I had an identity crisis as a result and it was a place I didn't like being in at all. Pretty much everything – I didn't like the clothes I was wearing, the songs that made it as singles...like everything!

— Lily Allen, on the album's conception and her struggle with her identity.

Following the release of Sheezus (2014), Allen had an "identity crisis", and did not enjoy the music she was releasing, her new image and believed that people within the music industry were controlling her musical choices and directions. Allen mentioned on the podcast News Roast that she had begun working on a new album, which would mainly deal with herself, her relationship with her children, the breakdown of her marriage, substance abuse, etc. During the same interview Allen revealed that her follow up to Sheezus would be much more personal, revealing that some songs would feature themes of social commentary, but most songs would deal with her personal life and the breakdown of her marriage. Allen also revealed that some songs would have political undertones but she was struggling to find the balance of creating such songs with "catchy" melodies.

When conceiving the album Allen wanted to work through her problems via music. Allen decided to do this because she felt that people are often led "by outside forces" when they are trying to express themselves, this is something she wanted to explore when creating No Shame. When developing the album, Allen wanted to explore the ways humans interact. Allen stated that humans often work through issues and problems by talking, stating that is what music does for her, she aimed to share personal issues in order to connect with people, rather than "connect with algorithms." Allen continued to state that she wanted to explore people's fear of expressing themselves, due to the repercussions. Allen aimed to create the best album she could, by limiting the number of people who were involved in the process. Lily did not want people telling her what they believed was right and wrong, and what was going to work for radio and what would not.

Allen has described the album as a backlash to tabloids and public discourse about her, saying that it is "taking ownership of [her] narrative and presenting it in musical form". The album's writing was influenced by the breakdown of her marriage with Sam Cooper, and the effect of a long-term stalker on her. Allen isolated herself from her friends, whom she says sided with Cooper in the divorce, and used No Shame as a creative outlet.

== Writing and recording ==
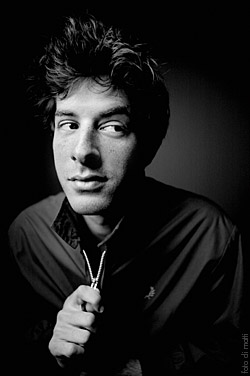
Recording of the album began in 2015 in a rented house in Los Angeles. During her stay in Los Angeles Allen worked on "Family Man" and "My One" with Mark Ronson (pictured).

In 2015, Allen and Fryars began writing songs for No Shame in a rented house in Los Angeles. Allen then set up her own studio space in London, where the majority of the album was made. She worked with Mark Ronson and Ezra Koenig on "My One". Mark Ronson, whom Allen had previously worked with on her debut album, praised the studio sessions and her vocals, stating Allen had been writing some of her "best songs", and calling it some of her most "honest and heartbreaking music ever".

Upon returning to London and setting up her studio space, Allen began associating with British grime artist Giggs. Allen stated that her friendship with Giggs helped her "find her feet" during the album's initial recording process. After Allen's performance at V Festival, she traveled to Giggs' studio where she played him songs from No Shame, whilst Allen was there Giggs wrote a verse for the song "Trigger Bang". When writing and recording the albums ballad songs such as "Family Man", "Three" and "Apples" Allen wanted to write in a much more truthful manner than her previous record. In contrast to her previous records, which focused on observations of other people, in "No Shame" Allen wished to turn the observation inward and be much more self-reflective.

Allen and her ex-husband share custody of their children; when her children were with her ex-husband she would go to the studio and work on the record. Allen stated that she often found it "difficult to articulate how I'm feeling about things, but I do find it easy [to communicate through] the medium of music. It’s cathartic. I'm happy [now] -- I'm enjoying myself." Allen chose not to work with long time producer Greg Kurstin, as she wanted to be independent and show that she could make a good record without him. Allen stated that when recording "No Shame" she was "forced to look at everything around me after the last album campaign." Feeling that her previous album was rushed, she wished to work without time constraints. Allen delivered the whole album to the label once it was finished rather than delivering scores to the label, as she did with previous albums. Prior to the album's release Allen also stated that she felt that the album would be a "commercial disaster". Elaborating on this, Allen said that she no longer cared for creating radio songs "manufactured with euphoric choruses and monstrous drops" and was more interested in creating music she enjoyed, which she believed would hinder her commercial success.

== Music and lyrics ==
No Shame plays out like an audio diary. In equal parts vengeance, rant, heart dump and celebration, it feels like Allen is checking in, letting us know where she is, how she feels, who she hates – like we’ve been given the password to her LiveJournal.

— Helen Clark, discussing the albums' composition and lyrical content.

A predominantly electropop, dancehall and electro-R&B album, No Shame takes influence from pop, grime and reggae and features a low key production. Allen departed from the witty sarcastic songwriting style of the albums predecessors and instead opted for a more "candid" approach. The album's lyrics are "confessional" and the breakdown of Allen's marriage is a key lyrical theme throughout the album, however some songs touch upon themes of maternal guilt, the breakdown of friendships and Allen's old partying lifestyle.

No Shame opens with "Come On Then". The song represents Allen's more chaotic side, and illustrates Allen's disillusionment with how she is depicted in the media and the fame and reality she has become use to. During the album's recording Allen wanted to discuss her battle with substance abuse. These themes were introduced on the piano-tinged hip pop song "Trigger Bang". The song contains a chilled-out sound and toned-down percussion instrumental. It lyrically reminisces about growing up and battling substance abuse. "What You Waiting For?" hears Allen take blame for the failure of her marriage while appealing for forgiveness and reconciliation. "Your Choice" features guest vocals from Nigerian afrobeats singer Burna Boy.

Allen's relationships and the breakdown of her marriage are also a recurring theme on the album. "Lost My Mind" is a sparse mellow dance ballad, with heavy Autotune that discusses the end of a relationship, whilst Allen questions her own sanity after a painful breakup. "Higher" contains elements of dancehall, soft guitar notes and bass switches, whilst lyrically the song is a melancholy relationship drama that starts with an intro performed by grime MC Meridian Dan. "Family Man" is a piano ballad that drew comparisons to the work of The Carpenters. "Apples" features Allen singing over a guitar in a falsetto vocal, whilst lyrically it deals with the breakdown of Allen's marriage, self blame and drawing a connection between her marital failures and her parents. Allen's relationship with her children was one of the themes she was interested in exploring, reflected in "Three", a piano ballad written from the perspective of one of Allen's young daughters.

"Everything to Feel Something" details Allen's breakdown and identity crisis during Sheezus along with the bad personal choices she made during that same period of time. "Waste" features British Grime artist Lady Chann and was compared to Allen's 2006 debut Alright, Still. "My One" is a "sex-positive" song that features "witty couplets that were also compared to Alright, Still. "Pushing Up Daisies" is an uplifting song, that was dedicated to Allen's boyfriend Daniel London (Meridian Dan). Lyrically the song explores themes of wanting to enter a new relationship but fearing it is too soon. The song also makes references to The Beatles' song "When I'm Sixty-Four" and the NHS. The album closes with "Cake", a "summery" R&B song that lyrically references patriarchy.

== Release and promotion ==
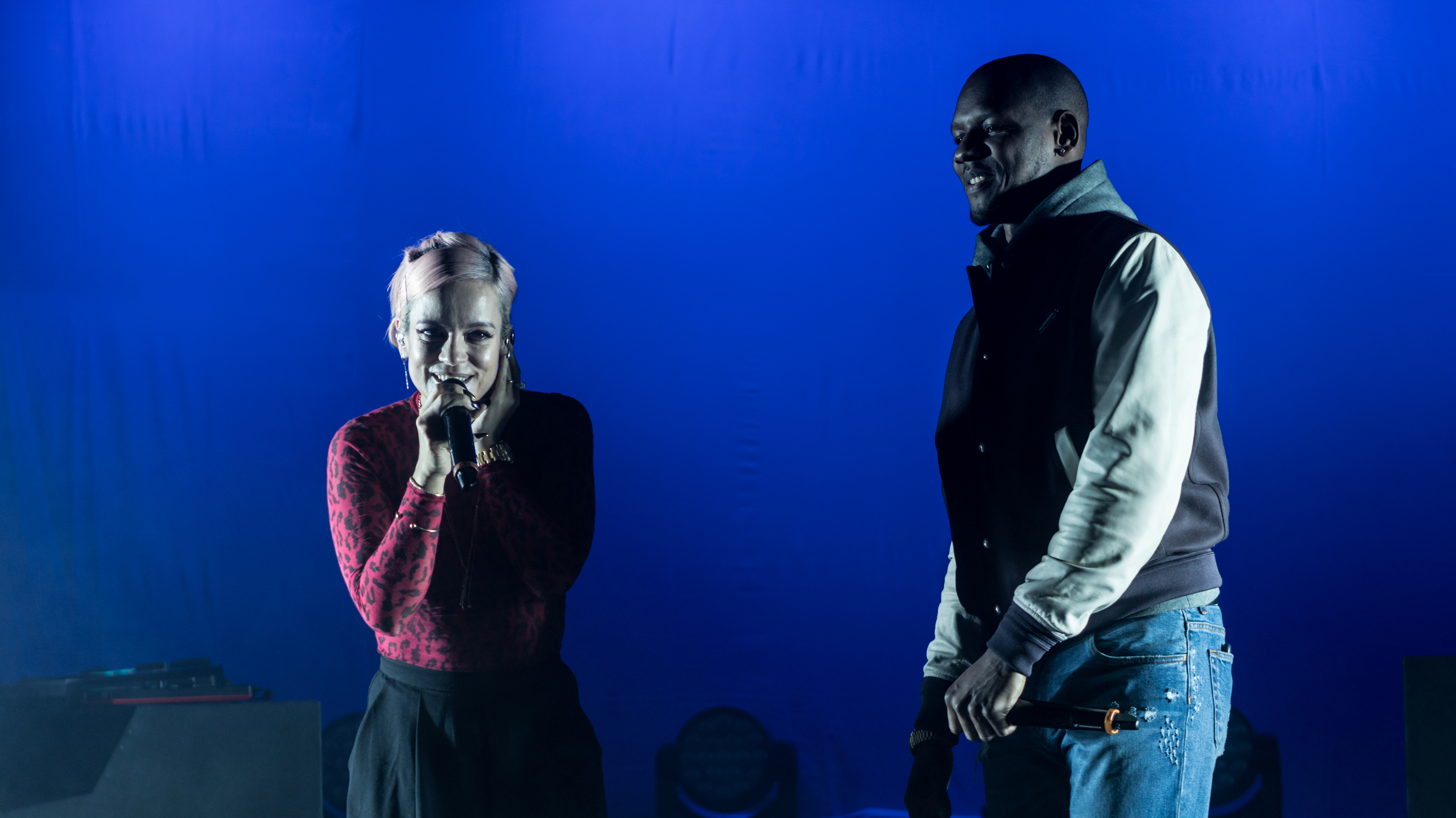
Allen performing "Trigger Bang" with rapper Giggs at Tufnell Park Dome in March 2018

In late 2017, Allen uploaded numerous songs online in preparation for the album, including the track titled "Family Man". On 12 December 2017, Allen released the album's lead single, "Trigger Bang", featuring British grime artist, Giggs. On 24 January 2018, Allen announced her new album would be called No Shame and would be released in "early Summer 2018". The song was praised by critics, who applauded Allen and Giggs chemistry as well as the song's lyrical content. An accompanying music video for "Trigger Bang" directed by Myles Whittingham was released on 24 January 2018. The video made references to the videos of her previous singles "LDN" and "22".

On 9 March 2018, Allen released two songs from the album titled "Three" and "Higher". Allen also announced that the album would be released on 8 June 2018 via Parlophone. Later that month, Allen embarked on a tour, starting off in Manchester, United Kingdom on 20 March, making stops in London, Hamburg, Berlin, Paris and Amsterdam before traveling to the United States for shows in New York and California. The tour is set to end in Switzerland on 17 June 2018.

During the album's promotion, Allen traveled to the United States. She performed "Three" on Late Night with Seth Meyers, accompanied by just a piano. On 1 June 2018, Allen released another promotional song, "Lost My Mind". The same day she announced that she would embark on a North American tour in support of the album. The North American leg of the tour will begin in early October and run through until mid-November. On 6 June 2018 Allen released a video for "Lost My Mind", the Myles Whittingham-directed clip was set in a bedroom where Allen paces up the floors, walls and ceiling. The following day Allen was set to visit Good Morning Britain in order to promote the album, but after having an argument with Piers Morgan over gun violence she was cancelled. A remix of "Lost My Mind" by Michael Calfan was released as the album's first promotional single on 6 July 2018. A remix of "What You Waiting For" featuring Jamaican dancehall singer Popcaan was released as the album's second promotional single on 25 April 2019.

== Critical reception ==
Professional ratings
Aggregate scores
Source	Rating
Metacritic	74/100
Review scores
Source	Rating
AllMusic	3.5/5 stars
The A.V. Club	C
Consequence of Sound	B+
The Daily Telegraph	4/5 stars
The Guardian	4/5 stars
The Independent	4/5 stars
The Line of Best Fit	4.5/5 stars
NME	4/5 stars
Pitchfork	6.3/10
Q	4/5 stars
Rolling Stone	3.5/5 stars
Vice (Expert Witness)	(1-star Honorable Mention)

At Metacritic, which assigns a weighted mean rating out of 100 to reviews from mainstream critics, the album received an average score of 74, based on 23 reviews, indicating "generally positive reviews". In a positive review, Nick Levine from the NME praised the album, Allen's songwriting and her artistic progress. Levine described the album as a "low-key, vibey album" which featured some of Allen's most "candid songwriting", which he saw as "consistently gripping and very affecting." Writing on behalf of The Daily Telegraph, Neil McCormick stated "it is as if one of the saddest albums you will ever hear is masquerading as a set of party hits", concluding that nevertheless, "No Shame should be compulsory listening for every young wannabe who still thinks pop stardom will be a panacea for all their problems."

On behalf of Consequence of Sound, Zack Ruskin wrote that "with No Shame, Allen has eschewed making an Irish exit from her days as a party girl and instead delivered a eulogy that gracefully buries the past while continuing to seek the sunshine of the future." Roisin O'Connor of The Independent stated "No Shame is a return to form in every sense: a confident, well-produced and deeply personal work." A reviewer from Q magazine wrote, "No Shame is a reminder that this is what Allen does, and she does it very well." Maura Johnston of Rolling Stone believed that the album "might sound placid on its surface, but a closer listen reveals that as her sonics have become more gentle, Allen's truth bombs have become even more explosive."

For The Guardian, Alexis Petridis stated: "It would be a hard listen were it not for the fact that the music is so great: tropical house shot in soft-focus and slow-motion, orchestrated 70s singer-songwriter ballads, every melody and chorus finished to a uniformly high standard." In a less positive review Jesse Hassenger from The A.V. Club noted that No Shame "is a prettier, more heartfelt record than Sheezus, but only a slightly better one." Beth Bowles from Exclaim! lauded the album's vulnerability, saying "The lyrics are raw and honest, while still providing catchy pop beats with hints of grime woven through."

=== Accolades ===
No Shame was nominated for a Mercury Prize, with the album being one of 12 to be shortlisted for the award.

== Commercial performance ==
No Shame debuted at number eight on the UK Albums Chart with first week sales of 8,754 copies, becoming Allen's fourth UK top-10 album but her first album to not chart within the top three. It also debuted at number two on the UK's Official Record Store Chart, which consists of the UK's biggest albums of the week sold through 100 UK independent record shops, based on sales of CDs, vinyl and other formats. As of September 2018, the album had sold 17,862 copies in the United Kingdom. In 2026, Allen described No Shame as a “flop” and “commercial failure.”

== Track listing ==
No.	Title	Writer(s)	Producer(s)	Length
1.	"Come on Then"	Lily Allen; Benjamin Fryars Garrett	Seb Chew; Emre Ramazanoglu	3:11
2.	"Trigger Bang" (featuring Giggs)	Allen; Garrett; Nathaniel Thompson	Fryars	3:32
3.	"What You Waiting For?"	Allen; Dre Skull; Liana Banks	Dre Skull; Samuel "Wildlife!" Reinhard^{[a]}	3:07
4.	"Your Choice" (featuring Burna Boy)	Allen; Richard "P2J" Isong; Burna Boy; Ari PenSmith	P2J	3:42
5.	"Lost My Mind"	Allen; Tim Rice-Oxley	Chew; Ramazanoglu	3:48
6.	"Higher"	Allen; P2J; Alastair O'Donnell; Daniel London	P2J	4:08
7.	"Family Man"	Allen; Garrett	Mark Ronson; Starsmith^{[a]}	3:39
8.	"Apples"	Allen; Sam Duckworth; Greg Gonzalez	Allen; Jack Nichols-Marcy	3:40
9.	"Three"	Allen; Garrett	Fryars	3:38
10.	"Everything to Feel Something"	Allen; Garrett; Jenna Andrews; Eliza Caird	Fryars	4:57
11.	"Waste" (featuring Lady Chann)	Allen; Ellis Taylor; Tim Deal; Lady Chann	Show N Prove; Hight	3:31
12.	"My One"	Allen; Ezra Koenig; Michael Tucker; Ronson	Ronson; Koenig; BloodPop	2:58
13.	"Pushing Up Daisies"	Allen; Cass Lowe	Lowe	3:45
14.	"Cake"	Allen; Taylor; Billy Stewart	Show N Prove	3:28
Total length:				51:04

Notes

- ^{^[a]} signifies an additional producer.
- "Apples" contains elements inspired by "K", written by Greg Gonzalez.
- "Cake" contains a sound recording sample from "Sitting in the Park" by Billy Stewart.

== Personnel ==
Credits adapted from the liner notes of No Shame.

=== Musicians ===
- Lily Allen – lead vocals
- Seb Chew – programming (tracks 1, 5, 12)
- Emre Ramazanoglu – programming (tracks 1, 5, 12)
- Giggs – featured vocals (track 2)
- Fryars – backing vocals (track 2); programming (tracks 2, 10); piano (track 9)
- Dre Skull – programming (track 3)
- Wildlife! – programming (track 3)
- Burna Boy – featured vocals (track 4)
- Mark Ronson – guitar (track 4); programming (track 7)
- P2J – programming (tracks 4, 6)
- Alastair O'Donnell – guitar (track 6)
- Josefina Vergara – strings (track 7)
- Gerado Hillera – strings (track 7)
- Steve Richards – strings (track 7)
- Mario Deleon – strings (track 7)
- Suzie Katayama – strings (track 7)
- Joel Pargman – strings (track 7)
- Sarah Perkins – strings (track 7)
- Andrew Duckles – strings (track 7)
- Charlie Bisharat – strings (track 7)
- Thomas Lea – strings (track 7)
- Michele Richards – strings (track 7)
- David Campbell – string arrangement and conducting (track 7)
- Sam Duckworth – guitar (track 8)
- Jack Nichols-Marcy – programming (track 8)
- Max Taylor – bass (track 9)
- Sean Lennon – additional instrumentation, "toys" (track 9)
- Lady Chann – featured vocals (track 11)
- Show N Prove – programming (tracks 11, 14)
- Cass Lowe – piano, drums, synths, organ, programming (track 13)

=== Technical ===
- Seb Chew – production (tracks 1, 5); mixing (tracks 1, 5, 10, 12); executive production
- Emre Ramazanoglu – production (tracks 1, 5); mixing (tracks 1, 5, 10, 12); recording (tracks 1, 5, 12)
- Fryars – production, recording (tracks 2, 9, 10)
- Dre Skull – production (track 3)
- Wildlife! – additional production, recording (track 3)
- P2J – production (tracks 4, 6)
- Mark Ronson – production, recording (tracks 7, 12)
- Starsmith – additional production (track 7)
- William Truax – string production (track 7)
- Lily Allen – production (track 8); executive production
- Jack Nichols-Marcy – production (track 8); vocal engineering (tracks 1, 4, 5, 10, 11, 13, 14), recording (tracks 4, 6, 8, 13)
- Show N Prove – production, mixing assistance, recording (tracks 11, 14)
- Ezra Koenig – production, recording (track 12)
- BloodPop – production, recording (track 12)
- Cass Lowe – production, recording (track 13)
- Marcello "Cool" Valenzano – mixing (track 2)
- Alexander "Smitty Beatz" Smith – mixing assistance (track 2)
- Mark "Exit" Goodchild – mixing (tracks 3, 4, 6, 11, 14)
- Tom Elmhirst – mixing (tracks 7–9)
- Brandon Boost – mixing assistance (tracks 7–9)
- Mark "Spike" Stent – mixing (track 13)
- Michael Freeman – mixing assistance (track 13)
- Riccardo Damian – additional engineering (tracks 9, 12)
- Stuart Hawkes – mastering

=== Artwork ===
- Bella Howard – photography
- Lily Allen – design, layout
- Seb Chew – design, layout
- Rich – design, layout

== Charts ==
=== Weekly charts ===
Chart (2018)	Peak position
Australian Albums (ARIA)	8
Belgian Albums (Ultratop Flanders)	41
Belgian Albums (Ultratop Wallonia)	68
Dutch Albums (Album Top 100)	68
French Albums (SNEP)	138
German Albums (Offizielle Top 100)	65
Irish Albums (IRMA)	20
New Zealand Albums (RMNZ)	40
Scottish Albums (Official Charts)	8
Swiss Albums (Schweizer Hitparade)	26
UK Albums (Official Charts)	8
US Billboard 200	168

Chart (2026)	Peak position
Croatian International Albums (HDU)	6

=== Monthly charts ===
Monthly chart performance
Chart (2026)	Position
Croatian International Vinyl Albums (HDU)	6

== Release history ==
List of release dates, showing region, formats, label, editions and reference
Region	Date	Format(s)	Label	Ref.
Various	8 June 2018	CD; LP; digital download; streaming	Parlophone	
Brazil	29 June 2018	CD	Warner Music	

== See also ==
- List of UK top 10 albums in 2018
