= Forever (Popcaan album) =

Studio album by Popcaan
- Released: July 20, 2018
- Studio: Unruly Ent. Kingston; Mixpak Studios (Brooklyn, New York City)
- Genre: Dancehall; reggae fusion; pop
- Length: 56:58
- Label: Mixpak Records
- Producer: Dre Skull; Bless Beats; Markus Records; Mini E5; Notnice

Popcaan chronology
Where We Come From (2014)	Forever (2018)	Fixtape (2020)

Forever is the second studio album by Jamaican musician Popcaan. It was released on July 20, 2018, via Mixpak Records. Production was primarily handled by Andrew "Dre Skull" Hershey, who also served as executive producer. It features a sole guest appearance from Davido.

In the United States, the album entered the Billboard 200 at number 171 and reached number 2 on the Reggae Albums chart. Popcaan headlined Reggae Sumfest on the day of the album's release, and toured in support of the album to arenas across the United Kingdom and Canada.

== Critical reception ==
Professional ratings
Aggregate scores
Source	Rating
AnyDecentMusic?	6.3
Metacritic	74/100
Review scores
Source	Rating
Crack Magazine	8/10
HipHopDX	4/5
NME	4/5 stars
Pitchfork	6.9/10
The Independent	3/5 stars
The Observer	2/5 stars
The Times	3/5 stars
Tom Hull	B+

Forever was met with generally favorable reviews from critics. At Metacritic, which assigns a normalized rating out of 100 to reviews from mainstream publications, the album received an average score of 74 based on six reviews. The aggregator AnyDecentMusic? has the critical consensus of the album at a 6.3 out of 10, based on eight reviews. The aggregator Album of the Year assessed the critical consensus as 68 out of 100, based on 6 reviews.

=== Accolades ===
Publication	List	Rank	Ref.
Complex	The 50 Best Albums of 2018	41	
Esquire	The 50 Best Albums Of 2018	*	
Noisey	The 100 Best Albums of 2018	65	

== Track listing ==
No.	Title	Writer(s)	Producer(s)	Length
1.	"Silence"	Andrae Sutherland; Andrew Hershey	Dre Skull	3:36
2.	"Call Me"	Sutherland; Hershey	Dre Skull	3:29
3.	"Wine for Me"	Sutherland; Hershey	Dre Skull	3:07
4.	"Superstar"	Sutherland; Hershey	Dre Skull	2:56
5.	"Happy Now"	Sutherland; Hershey	Dre Skull	3:48
6.	"Naked"	Sutherland; Mark Myrie	Markus Records	2:54
7.	"High Drive (Louis Out)"	Sutherland; Ainsley Morris	Notnice	2:14
8.	"Foreign Love"	Sutherland; Hershey	Dre Skull	3:58
9.	"Body So Good"	Sutherland; Hershey	Dre Skull	3:37
10.	"Lef My Gun"	Sutherland; Hershey	Dre Skull	3:07
11.	"Mi Luv Yuh"	Sutherland; Hershey	Dre Skull	2:27
12.	"Deserve It All"	Sutherland; Morris	Notnice	2:21
13.	"Dun Rich" (featuring Davido)	Sutherland; David Adedeji Adeleke; Hershey	Dre Skull	3:23
14.	"Strong Woman"	Sutherland; Morris	Notnice	3:23
15.	"Through the Storm"	Sutherland; Damian Gager; Gareth Keane; Ryan Griffiths	Mini E5; Bless Beats	3:30
16.	"Firm and Strong"	Sutherland; Hershey	Dre Skull	4:58
17.	"A Wha Suh"	Sutherland; Morris	Notnice	3:25
Total length:				56:58

== Personnel ==
- Andrae "Popcaan" Sutherland – vocals, A&R
- David Adedeji "Davido" Adeleke – vocals (track 13)
- Andrew "Dre Skull" Hershey – producer (tracks: 1–5, 8–11, 13, 16), executive producer, A&R
- Markus "Markus Records" Myrie – producer (track 6)
- Ainsley "Notnice" Morris – producer (tracks: 7, 12, 14, 17)
- Damian "Mini E5" Gager – producer (track 15)
- Gareth Keane – producer (track 15)
- Ryan Griffiths – producer (track 15)
- Mark "Exit" Goodchild – mixing (tracks: 1–8, 10–12, 14–17)
- Leslie Brathwaite – mixing (tracks: 9, 13)
- Chris Athens – mastering
- Susannah Webb – creative direction, A&R
- Phillip T. Annand – art direction
- Ivar Wigan – photography

== Charts ==
Chart (2018)	Peak position
Belgian Albums (Ultratop Flanders)	195
Canadian Albums (Billboard)	72
Dutch Albums (Album Top 100)	139
Swiss Albums (Schweizer Hitparade)	100
US Billboard 200	171
US Independent Albums (Billboard)	21
US Heatseekers Albums (Billboard)	6
US Reggae Albums (Billboard)	2
