= Jubilee (DJ) =

American electronic musician

- Born: Jessica Gentile; Miami, Florida
- Occupation: Electronic musician

Jubilee is an American electronic musician.

== Early career ==
Jubilee began DJing as part of the underground rave scene in Miami, Florida. She moved to New York City in 2003. She primarily plays Miami bass-inspired club music, incorporating 2-step, dubstep, house, and grime into her DJ sets. In 2008, she began working with Jason Forrest on a label named Nightshifters and threw a series of parties with Nick Catchdubs and DJ Ayres named Flashing Lights. She also collaborated with fellow DJ/producers Udachi and Star Eyes (with whom she released the tracks "Locked" and "Merkwood Estates" on Unknown to the Unknown). After shutting down Nightshifters, she began collaborating with Mixpak, which released her EPs Pull Ova, Pop It!, and Jealous. Pop It! was reviewed in Spin in 2012.

== Current career ==
In 2016, Jubilee joined Mixpak artists Popcaan, Spice, and Dre Skull for Mixpak's debut appearance at Red Bull's Culture Clash. They won the contest.

Also in 2016, Jubilee released her debut album, After Hours, on Mixpak. The album received favorable reviews from Pitchfork, Fader, and Fact Magazine. She was named as one of Brooklyn Magazine's "Brooklyn 100". That same year, Pitchfork named After Hours one of the top electronic music albums of 2016. This was followed up in 2019 with a sophomore record entitled Call for Location, featuring collaborations with P Money and Maluca.

Jubilee currently heads the record label Magic City.

== Discography ==
1. Pop It! EP, Mixpak, 2012
2. Keys Phone Wallet EP, with Burt Fox, Trouble & Bass, 2013 (re-released on Magic City, 2022)
3. Pull Ova EP, Mixpak, 2014
4. Jealous EP, Mixpak, 2015
5. After Hours, Mixpak, 2016
6. Call for Location, Mixpak, 2019
7. Are We There Yet? EP, Magic City, 2020
8. Don't Play This EP, Magic City, 2021
9. Sunscreen EP, Magic City, 2022
