= Trigger Bang =

Single by Lily Allen featuring Giggs

from the album No Shame
- Released: 12 December 2017
- Genre: Hip pop
- Length: 3:32
- Label: Parlophone
- Songwriters: Lily Allen; Benjamin Gerrett; Nathaniel Thomson
- Producer: Fryars

Lily Allen singles chronology
"Cigarettes & Cush" (2017)	"Trigger Bang" (2017)	"Madeline" (2025)

Giggs singles chronology
"Peligro" (2017)	"Trigger Bang" (2017)	"Higher" (2017)

Music video
- "Trigger Bang" on YouTube

"Trigger Bang" is a song by English singer-songwriter Lily Allen, featuring English rapper Giggs. It was released on 12 December 2017 as the lead single from Allen's fourth studio album, No Shame. It is her first official release since her third studio album, Sheezus, and the first official single released by Allen since "As Long as I Got You". The song was teased and leaked a night prior to its official release.

== Background ==
In 2015 Allen began writing songs for No Shame in a rented house in Los Angeles. Allen then set up her own studio space in London, where the majority of the album was made. Upon returning to London and setting up her studio space, Allen began associating with British rapper Giggs. Allen stated that her friendship with Giggs helped her "find her feet" during the album's initial recording process. After Allen's performance at V Festival, she traveled to Giggs' studio where she played him songs from No Shame, whilst Allen was there Giggs wrote a verse for the song "Trigger Bang".

== Composition ==
"Trigger Bang" is a piano-tinged hip pop song that has a length of three minutes and 32 seconds. It is in the key of A-flat minor, and moves at a tempo of 78 beats per minute in a 4/4 time signature. The song contains a chilled-out sound and toned-down percussion instrumental. It lyrically reminisces about growing up and battling substance abuse.

== Critical reception ==
Robin Murray of Clash praised the song, writing that "the pairing [of Allen and Giggs] works effortlessly – Lily Allen's nonchalance versus the rapper's emphatic flow." She additionally called it "typically tongue in cheek but with whipsmart wordplay".

== Music video ==
An accompanying music video for "Trigger Bang" directed by Myles Whittingham was released on 24 January 2018. It features the singers and depicts Allen in three different ages, with two actress portraying younger versions of her. The video also references the videos of her previous singles "LDN" and "22".

== Credits and personnel ==
Credits adapted from Tidal.

- Lily Allen – songwriting, vocals
- Giggs – songwriting, vocals
- Fryars – songwriting, production, recording, guitar, piano, programming, synthesizer
- Shane the Cutter – mastering
- Alexander "Smitty Beatz" Smith – mixing
- Marcello "Cool" Valenzano – mixing

== Charts ==
Chart (2017–18)	Peak position
Belgium (Ultratip Bubbling Under Flanders)	26
Belgium (Ultratip Bubbling Under Wallonia)	45

== Release history ==
Region	Date	Format	Label	Ref.
Various	12 December 2017	Digital download	Parlophone	
