= Sukup =

Sukup is a surname. Notable people with the surname include:

- Milo Sukup (1917–1983), American football player and coach
- Ondřej Sukup (born 1988), Czech footballer
- Steven Sukup (born 1956), American politician

== See also ==
- Suku (disambiguation)
