= Someone Out There =

Studio album by Rae Morris
- Released: 2 February 2018
- Recorded: 2016–17
- Genre: Art pop; electronic
- Length: 41:54
- Label: Atlantic
- Producer: Fryars; Rae Morris; My Riot; Ariel Rechtshaid; Fred

Rae Morris chronology
Unguarded (2015)	Someone Out There (2018)	Rachel@Fairyland (2022)

Singles from Someone Out There
- 1. "Reborn" Released: 1 June 2017; 2. "Do It" Released: 15 September 2017; 3. "Atletico (The Only One)" Released: 22 November 2017; 4. "Someone Out There" Released: 23 March 2018; 5. "Dancing with Character" Released: 18 October 2018

Someone Out There is the second studio album by English singer and songwriter Rae Morris, released on 2 February 2018 through Atlantic Records. Five singles have been released from the album: "Reborn", "Do It", "Atletico (The Only One)", "Someone Out There" and "Dancing with Character".

== Critical reception ==
Professional ratings
Aggregate scores
Source	Rating
AnyDecentMusic?	7.5/10
Metacritic	74/100
Review scores
Source	Rating
AllMusic	4.5/5 stars
Clash	7/10
DIY	4/5 stars
Financial Times	3/5 stars
The Guardian	4/5 stars
NME	4/5 stars
Q	3/5 stars
The Times	4/5 stars
Uncut	5/10

Someone Out There received generally positive reviews from music critics. At Metacritic, the album received an average score of 74 out of 100 based on six reviews, indicating "generally favorable reviews". In The Guardian, critic Laura Snapes wrote positively about Morris that she achieved something unusual for an artist on a major label, "she has made a pop album with an innate experimental sensibility."

== Singles ==
"Reborn" was released as the album's lead single on 1 June 2017 along with its music video. "Do It" followed as the second single on 15 September 2017, with "Atletico (The Only One)" being released as the third single on 22 November 2017. The title track of the album, "Someone Out There" was sent to radios on 23 March 2018. The last track of the album, "Dancing with Character" was released on 18 October 2018 as a fifth single along with a music video.

== Track listing ==
Credits adapted from Tidal.

No.	Title	Writer(s)	Producer(s)	Length
1.	"Push Me to My Limit"	Rae Morris, Steve Robson	My Riot, Morris	3:26
2.	"Reborn"	Morris, Benjamin Garrett	Fryars, My Riot, Morris	4:05
3.	"Atletico (The Only One)"	Morris, Garrett	Fryars, My Riot, Morris	3:25
4.	"Do It"	Morris, Garrett	Fryars, My Riot, Morris	3:34
5.	"Wait for the Rain"	Morris, Garrett	Fryars, My Riot, Morris	3:57
6.	"Lower the Tone"	Morris, Garrett	Fryars, My Riot, Morris	3:58
7.	"Physical Form"	Morris, Dan Nigro	My Riot, Morris	3:59
8.	"Dip My Toe"	Morris, Garrett, Josiah Sherman	Fryars, Morris	3:38
9.	"Someone Out There"	Morris, Garrett	Fryars, Ariel Rechtshaid, Fred	3:52
10.	"Rose Garden"	Morris, Jennifer Decilveo	My Riot, Morris	3:56
11.	"Dancing with Character"	Morris, Finlay Dow-Smith, Garrett	Starsmith	4:04

== Charts ==
Chart (2018)	Peak position
Scottish Albums (OCC)	23
UK Albums (OCC)	20

== Release history ==
Region	Release date	Format	Label	Ref
Worldwide	2 February 2018	CD; digital download; vinyl	Atlantic	
