= Wildlife! =

- Origin: Bern, Switzerland
- Genres: Electronic, Experimental Music
- Years active: 2008 – present
- Label: Mixpak Records
- Website: itswildlife.com

Samuel Riot, known professionally as Wildlife!, is a Swiss music producer and musician.

== Career ==
- On 5 March 2013 Wildlife!'s "Klouds" was released as part of the "Mixpak Pressure Vol. 2" compilation on Dre Skull's Mixpak Records imprint. The track was premiered on the Spin magazine website on 17 February.
- On 28 October 2014 Wildlife! and British producer Murlo's collaborative production "Control" was released as part of the "Pak Man" compilation, a joint venture release of Brooklyn based label Mixpak Records and Berlin based imprint Man Recordings.
- On 31 March 2015 Wildlife! released his "Fever Pitch" white label via Brooklyn based imprint Mixpak Records. It premiered on Fact (UK magazine) on 24 March.
- On 13 May 2016 Wildlife! released "Patterns", his official debut EP for Mixpak Records. The EP was translated into an immersive sound installation, which debuted at SIGNAL Gallery in Brooklyn on 14 May 2016.
- On 14 July 2017 Wildlife! released "Anima", his second EP for Mixpak Records. The EP was presented with an accompanying sound installation at Studio 301 on 15 July 2017 in Brooklyn, NY.
- On 12 July 2019 Wildlife! released "Ballads", his third EP for Mixpak Records.

== Discography ==
=== EPs ===
- Ballads (Mixpak Records, 2019)
- Anima (Mixpak Records, 2017)
- Patterns (Mixpak Records, 2016)
- Fever Pitch (Mixpak Records, 2015)

=== Singles ===
- Murlo & Wildlife! - Control (Mixpak Records/Man Recordings, 2014)
- Wildlife! - Klouds (Mixpak Records, 2013)

=== Production discography ===
Year	Artist	Title	Album	Label	Credit
2019	Burna Boy	"Show & Tell ft. Future "	African Giant	Atlantic	Additional production
2019	Mabel	"Bad Behaviour"	High Expectations	Polydor	Additional production
2019	Giggs	"WHO"	BIG BAD...	No BS Music	Additional production
2019	Afro B, Vybz Kartel, Dre Skull	"Shape Nice"	Shape Nice (Single)	Mixpak Records	Additional production
2018	Gaika	"Yard"	Basic Volume	Warp	Production
2018	Popcaan	"Silence", "Call Me", "Wine For Me", "Superstar", "Happy Now", "Foreign Love", "Body So Good", "Lef My Gun", "Mi Love Yuh", "Dun Rich ft. Davido", "Firm and Strong",	Forever	Mixpak Records	Additional production
2018	Santigold	"Coo Coo Coo", "Wha You Feel Like", "I Don't Want", "Valley Of The Dolls", "Why Me", "Crashing Your Party", "Don't Blame Me", "A Perfect Life", "Gold Fire"	I Don't Want: The Gold Fire Sessions	Downtown Records	Additional production
2018	Lily Allen	"What You Waiting For?"	No Shame	Warner	Additional production
2018	Vybz Kartel	"Real Bad Gal"	Real Bad Gal (Single)	Mixpak Records	Additional production
