= Unguarded =

Unguarded may refer to:

- Unguarded (Amy Grant album), 1985
- Unguarded (Rae Morris album), 2015
- Unguarded, an Emmy-nominated ESPN documentary about basketball player Chris Herren
