= We Caa Done =

2023 single by Popcaan featuring Drake

Single by Popcaan featuring Drake

from the album Great Is He
- Released: 6 January 2023
- Genre: Dancehall
- Length: 4:05
- Label: OVO
- Songwriters: Andrae Sutherland; Aubrey Graham; Tresor Riziki
- Producers: Tresor; Batundi

Popcaan singles chronology
"Set It" (2022)	"We Caa Done" (2023)	"Great Is He" (2023)

Drake singles chronology
"Circo Loco" (2022)	"We Caa Done" (2023)	"Spin Bout U" (2023)

Music video
- "We Caa Done" on YouTube

"We Caa Done" is a song by Jamaican singer Popcaan featuring Canadian rapper Drake. It was released on January 6, 2023 through the latter's record label, OVO Sound, as the lead single from the former's fifth studio album, Great Is He. The song was written alongside Tresor, who produced it with Batundi.

== Background ==
Popcaan teased a snippet of "We Caa Done" two days before its release and confirmed all the details about it. The song received a positive review from Alphonse Pierre of Pitchfork, who felt that Popcaan's "two verses are filled with hypnotic moments, like the echo catching off his croons in the first or his impassioned, Auto-Tuned bellowing in the second" and Drake "doesn't have to do too much" as all he "has to do is manage the feel-good mood and let the nostalgia kick in". A dancehall song, Popcaan sings about his huge wealth and expensive lifestyle. Speaking about the song, he said through a press release: "'We Caa Done' is all about persevering. We don't think about limits. We're living the life we've dreamed of, and despite what the haters and naysayers have to say, we will only be greater".

== Music video ==
The official music video for "We Caa Done", directed by Theo Skudra, premiered alongside the release of the song on 6 January 2023. It also includes appearances from Drake's previous collaborator, American rapper Lil Yachty, and American professional basketball player Kevin Durant. It was shot in the Turks and Caicos Islands and sees both Popcaan and Drake dancing while on a boat and riding jetskis in water.

== Charts ==
Chart performance for "We Caa Done"
Chart (2023)	Peak position
Canada Hot 100 (Billboard)	36
Ireland (IRMA)	60
Netherlands (Single Tip)	4
New Zealand Hot Singles (RMNZ)	5
Suriname (Nationale Top 40)	4
UK Singles (OCC)	37
UK Hip Hop/R&B (OCC)	18
UK Indie (OCC)	5
US Bubbling Under Hot 100 (Billboard)	16
US Rhythmic Airplay (Billboard)	37
