= Rae Morris =

British singer (born 1992)

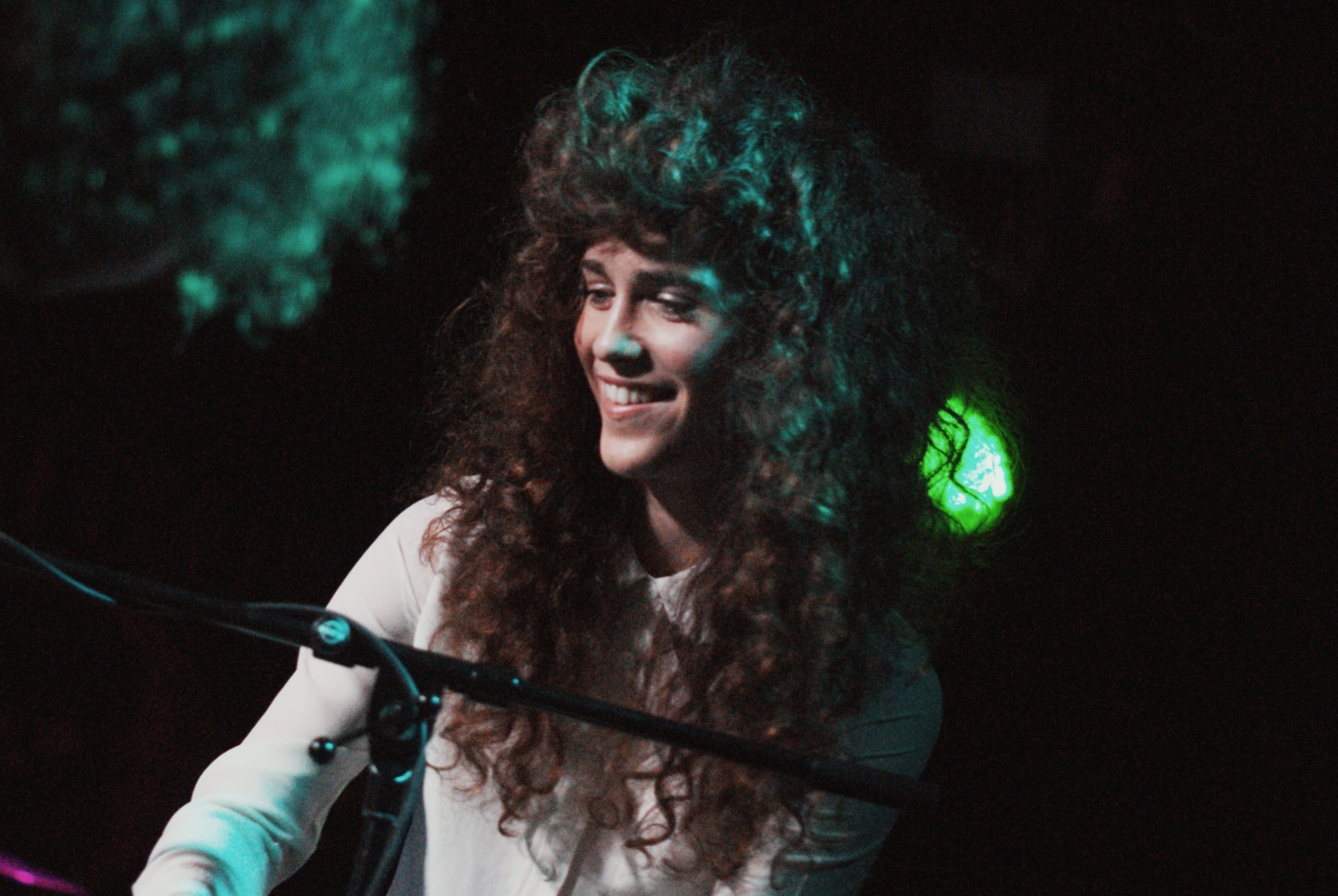
- Rae Morris performing at the Night and Day Cafe, Manchester, on 1 March 2012.

Background information
- Born: Rachel Anne Morris; 2 September 1992 (age 33); Blackpool, Lancashire, England
- Genres: Art pop
- Occupations: Musician; singer; songwriter
- Instruments: Vocals; piano
- Years active: 2011–present
- Labels: Atlantic; Warner
- Website: www.raemorris.co.uk

Rachel Anne "Rae" Morris (born 2 September 1992) is an English singer and songwriter. She released her debut album, Unguarded, in 2015. Her second album, Someone Out There, was released in January 2018. Her third album, Rachel@Fairyland, was released in July 2022.

== Early life ==
Morris was born in Blackpool, Lancashire, England, and started playing the piano when she was four years old. She attended St. George's School and then studied A-levels in music and drama at Cardinal Newman College in Preston, Lancashire. She worked as a waitress at the grounds of Blackpool F.C.

== Career ==
=== 2011: Early live appearances ===
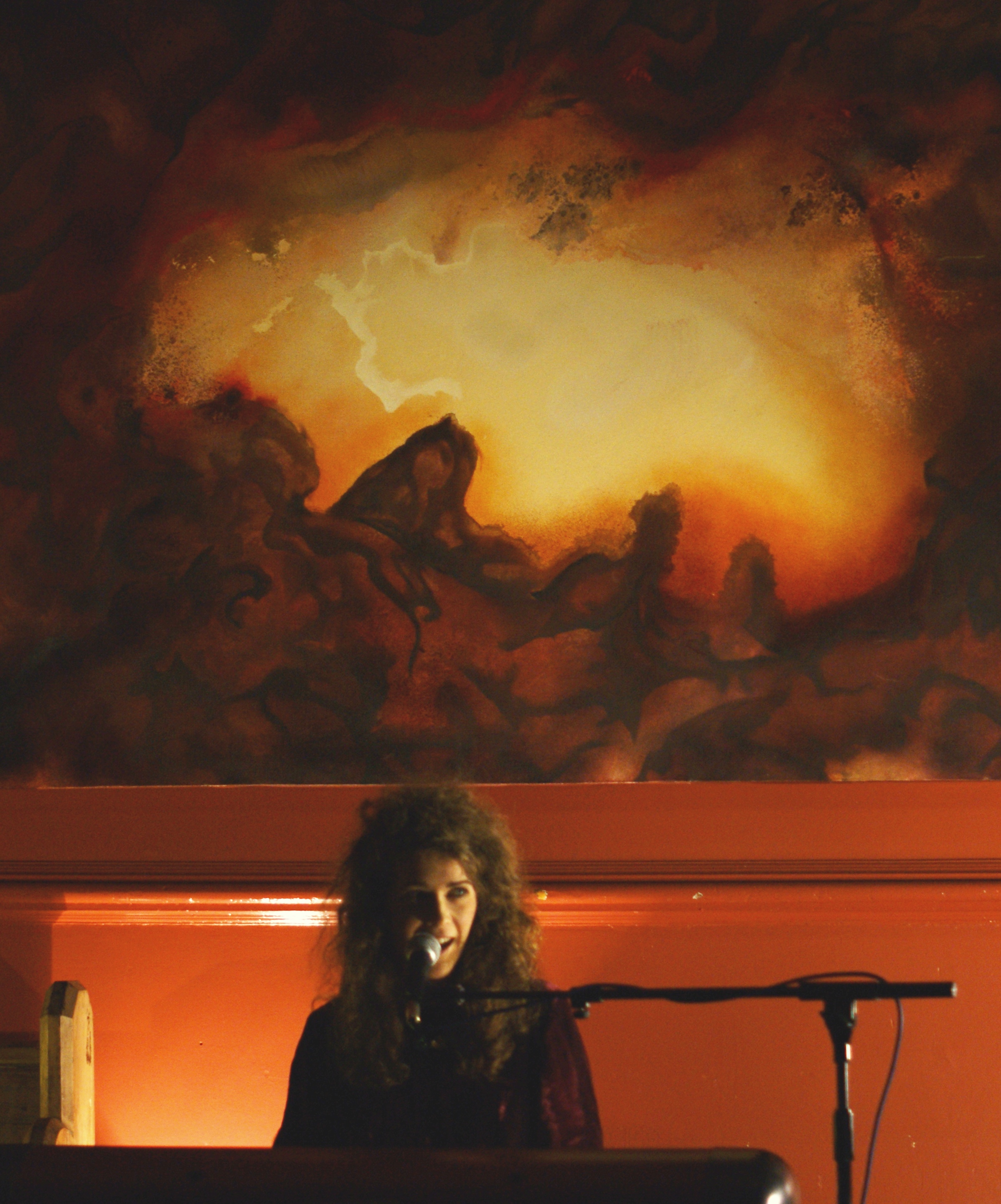
Morris at Kro Bar, Manchester, in January 2011.

Morris gigged in Blackpool and around the North-West England during her college studies. She attracted the attention of BBC Radio Lancashire presenter Sean McGinty, who put her forward to perform on the BBC Introducing stage at the Reading and Leeds Festivals in August 2011. She was signed to Universal Music Publishing Group the same month and to Atlantic Records in September 2011. Morris had received attention from other labels but chose Atlantic because they "would take it slow" and "didn't blow any smoke up my arse".

During this period she was mentored by fellow Blackpool singer-songwriter Karima Francis, who helped develop her songwriting skills. She was also in a two-year relationship with Francis, which she said inspired the songs on her debut album "about going through that, exploring that sexuality and those feelings for the first time. Then coming out the other side of that as well, so that's the album".

=== 2012–2014: EP releases ===
Morris released her debut single in March 2012, "Don't Go", following its use in the final episode of the sixth series of the television drama series Skins. She recorded an EP, For You, which she sold exclusively at her live performances in mid 2012, and in November released a second EP, Grow. Another EP, From Above, followed in 2013. Alongside her solo gigs during 2012 and 2013, Morris was a support act for artists including Bombay Bicycle Club, Lianne La Havas, Noah and the Whale, and Tom Odell. She contributed guest vocals to three tracks on Bombay Bicycle Club's 2014 album So Long, See You Tomorrow, including the single "Luna". Also in 2014, Morris co-wrote and featured on the Clean Bandit song "Up Again" (from their debut album New Eyes). Rae Morris was recently the MarkMeets featured artist of the month December 2014 Rae also opened for George Ezra on his European tour, as well as embarking on her own headlining UK tour.

=== 2014–2015: Unguarded ===
During 2014, Morris released the singles "Do You Even Know?", "Cold" (featuring Fryars), and "Closer"—each with accompanying EPs—to promote her debut album, Unguarded, which she recorded primarily in Los Angeles with producer Ariel Rechtshaid. Morris was longlisted in the BBC Sound of 2015 poll, and Unguarded was released in January 2015 alongside the single "Under the Shadows", with another headlining tour following in February. Unguarded, which also features production from Jim Eliot and Fryars, debuted at number nine on the UK Albums Chart.

Later in 2015, Morris appeared in a television advertisement for fashion retailer Boohoo that featured the album's fifth single, "Love Again". She featured on Sivu's single "The Nile" and performed at festivals including Bestival, Glastonbury, Lytham Festival, T in the Park, and Truck Festival. The sixth single from Unguarded, "Don't Go", was released in association with breast cancer awareness charity Coppafeel!.

=== 2018–2019: Someone Out There ===
Morris began work on the follow-up to Unguarded in late 2015. Touring to promote the album began in March 2017 and included a concert at Concorde 2 in Brighton supported by PAULi and Saskia Maxwell. In September a wider tour included Norwich, Nottingham, Salisbury Arts Centre, Leeds and Islington in London.

Working prominently with Fryars, Morris opted for a more electronic-oriented sound for her second album. Between July 2017 and October 2018, Morris released seven singles to promote the album - "Reborn", "Do It", "Atletico (The Only One)", "Push Me to My Limit", "Lower the Tone", "Someone Out There" and "Dancing With Character" - as well as various remixes. The album, titled Someone Out There, was released on 2 February 2018.

"For You" was featured in the first series of A Discovery of Witches, which was broadcast on Sky One in 2017. In July 2018, the song "Reborn" from Someone Out There was featured in the BBC's closing montage from the 2018 FIFA World Cup.

On 19 November 2018, Spice Girl Melanie C released "High Heels" featuring Sink the Pink, which was co-written with Morris.

On 4 June 2021, Morris released "Fish n Chips", a collaboration with TikTok star, grime artist, and fellow Blackpool native Soph Aspin.

=== 2022: Rachel@Fairyland ===
Work began on Morris' third album Rachel@Fairyland in October 2018, as she teased in an interview that she was "going away for a few months to write the next era." Morris released the first single from the album, "No Woman Is an Island", on 25 February 2022. She released three further singles for the album between April and July - "Running Shoes", "Go Dancing" (featuring Fryars), and "A Table for Two".

In July 2022, her third album Rachel@Fairyland was released. It sold 1,098 copies in its first week to debut at number 150 in the UK Albums Chart, 130 places lower than her second album, Someone Out There, charted in 2018.

== Personal life ==
Morris is married to frequent collaborator Fryars. Her brother William is married to Lucy Rose. On 26 May 2021, Morris announced via her Instagram that she was pregnant with her and Fryars' first child; their daughter, Marla, was born in June 2021. Their son Larry was born in April 2024.

== Discography ==
=== Studio albums ===
Title	Details	Peak chart positions
Title	Details	UK
Unguarded	Released: 26 January 2015; Label: Atlantic, Warner; Format: CD, digital download	9
Someone Out There	Released: 2 February 2018; Label: Atlantic, Warner; Format: CD, digital download	20
Rachel@Fairyland	Released: 8 July 2022; Label: RCA; Format: CD, vinyl, digital download, streaming	150
Rachel@Pianoland	Released: 25 November 2022; Label: Sony Music Entertainment; Format: CD, vinyl, digital download, streaming	—

=== Extended plays ===
Title	Details
For You	Released: 2012; Label: Atlantic, Warner; Format: CD
Grow	Released: 2012; Label: Atlantic, Warner; Format: CD, Digital download
From Above	Released: 19 April 2013; Label: Atlantic, Warner; Format: Digital download
Do You Even Know?	Released: 2014; Label: Atlantic, Warner; Format: Digital download
Cold	Released: 2014; Label: Atlantic, Warner; Format: Digital download
Closer	Released: 17 October 2014; Label: Atlantic, Warner; Format: Digital download
Someone Out There, at the Piano	Released: November 2019; Label: self-released; Format: Vinyl (Limited Edition)
Something Big, Something Bright	Released: 17 January 2025; Label: Schmotown; Format: Digital download

=== Singles ===
Year	Title	Peak chart positions	Album
Year	Title	UK	Album
2012	"Don't Go"	—	Unguarded
2012	"Grow"	—	Unguarded
2013	"From Above"	—	From Above EP
2014	"Do You Even Know?"	—	Unguarded
2014	"Cold" (featuring Fryars)	—	Unguarded
2014	"Closer"	—	Unguarded
2015	"Under the Shadows"	53	Unguarded
2015	"Love Again"	83	Unguarded
2017	"Reborn"	—	Someone Out There
2017	"Do It"	—	Someone Out There
2017	"Atletico (The Only One)"	—	Someone Out There
2018	"Push Me to My Limit"	—	Someone Out There
2018	"Lower the Tone"	—	Someone Out There
2018	"Someone Out There"	—	Someone Out There
2018	"Dancing with Character"	—	Someone Out There
2021	"Fish n Chips" (featuring Soph Aspin)	—	Non-album single
2022	"No Woman Is an Island"	—	Rachel@Fairyland
2022	"Running Shoes"	—	Rachel@Fairyland
2022	"Go Dancing" (featuring Fryars)	—	Rachel@Fairyland
2022	"A Table for Two"	—	Rachel@Fairyland
2022	"Birdsong on the Breeze"	—	Rachel@Pianoland
2022	"Sing It Dolly!"	—	Rachel@Pianoland
2025	"Something Good"	—	Something Big, Something Right
2025	"Much About Love"	—	Something Big, Something Right
"—" denotes a single that did not chart or was not released.

=== Music videos ===
Title	Year	Director
"Don't Go" (live version)	2012	The Blind Club
"Grow"	2012	Bouha Kazmi
"Way Back When"	2013	The Blind Club
"From Above"	2013	James Slater
"Wait a While"	2013	The Blind Club
"Skin"	2014	Nadia Marquard Otzen
"Do You Even Know?"	2014	Nadia Marquard Otzen
"Cold" (featuring Fryars)	2014	Nadia Marquard Otzen
"Closer"	2014	Zac Ella
"Under the Shadows"	2015	Alex Southam
"Love Again"	2015	Charlie Robins
"Don't Go"	2015	Louis Bhose
"Reborn"	2017	Noel Paul
"Do It"	2017	Noel Paul
"Atletico (The Only One)"	2017	Noel Paul
"Someone Out There"	2018	Noel Paul
"Dancing with Character"	2018	Noel Paul
"Fish n Chips" (featuring Soph Aspin)	2021	Unknown
"No Woman Is an Island"	2022	Noel Paul
"Go Dancing" (featuring Fryars)	2022	Unknown
