= Gemma Dunleavy =

Irish singer-songwriter

- Born: Dublin, Ireland
- Genres: Pop, garage, grime, electronic
- Occupations: Singer-songwriter, poet
- Instruments: Vocals, keyboards

Gemma Dunleavy is an Irish singer-songwriter. She is best known for her song "Up De Flats", which was an underground hit in Ireland.

== Early life ==
Dunleavy was born in Dublin and grew up on Sheriff Street in a working-class neighborhood. She lived in the Phil Shanahan Flats, a public housing complex which was demolished in the late 1990s. Dunleavy characterized the community as "like one big family", with close ties between neighbors.

As a child, she enjoyed singing but felt she had no outlet. “I used to try and sing over stuff I had taped on my radio. No one around me was into art, it wasn’t a normal thing in my family or around my road.” She trained in dance until suffering a debilitating leg injury.

== Career ==
In 2015, she was featured on the single "Jasmine" by electronic producer Murlo, published by Mixpak Records. That year she also performed a set at Boiler Room Dublin.

In 2017, she appeared as a guest vocalist on two songs on the album Ojalá by Lost Horizons, a project by former Cocteau Twins member Simon Raymonde.

In 2018, she released a poem "I Was Never Young But I’m Not Yet Old" and accompanying video about her life in Dublin.

In 2019, she released the grime single "Better 4 U" and an accompanying music video.

In July 2020, she released an EP, Up De Flats.

In 2022, she appeared in the documentary North Circular, which examines the history of music in Dublin and its connections to socioeconomic changes.

In 2024 and 2025, Dunleavy supported Kneecap for shows in Ireland and Northern Ireland.

== Political views ==
Dunleavy is a critic of classism in Ireland. She remembers family members using fake addresses on job applications since many employers refused to hire people from Sheriff Street. As a child, her dance teacher told her to "speak nice" and hide her working-class accent. She has criticized gentrification and its effects on Dublin.

In May 2025, she and more than 40 other British and Irish music acts signed a letter opposing the UK government's counterterrorism investigation into the Irish rap group Kneecap and expressing solidarity with Palestinians amid the humanitarian crisis in Gaza.

== Discography ==
=== Extended Plays ===
Up De Flats (2020)

== Recognition ==
In 2020, her single "Up De Flats" was shortlisted for the Choice Music Prize Irish Song of the Year.

In 2021, Dunleavy was a recipient of the Decade of Centenaries Markievicz Award, a €25,000 government grant for artists.
