= Suku =

Suku may refer to:

== Language ==
- Suku language, a Bantu language of the Democratic Republic of the Congo.

== Society ==
- Suku, the clan system of Minangkabau people
- Suku people, an ethnic group of Central Africa

== Given names ==
- Suku Park, South Korean artist
