= Power (Fryars album) =

Studio album by Fryars
- Released: 2014
- Genre: Pop

Fryars chronology
Dark Young Hearts (2009)	Power (2014)

Power is the second studio album of English musician Fryars.

Professional ratings
Aggregate scores
Source	Rating
Album of the Year	75/100
AnyDecentMusic?	7.2/10
Metacritic	77/100
Review scores
Source	Rating
The 405	8/10
AllMusic	4/5 stars
DIY	4/5 stars
The Guardian	4/5 stars
The Line of Best Fit	8.5/10
Loud and Quiet	5/10
The Music	3.5/4 stars
musicOMH	3.5/5 stars
NME	3.5/5 stars
Q	3/5 stars
