= Reggae Sumfest =

Music festival in Montego Bay, Jamaica

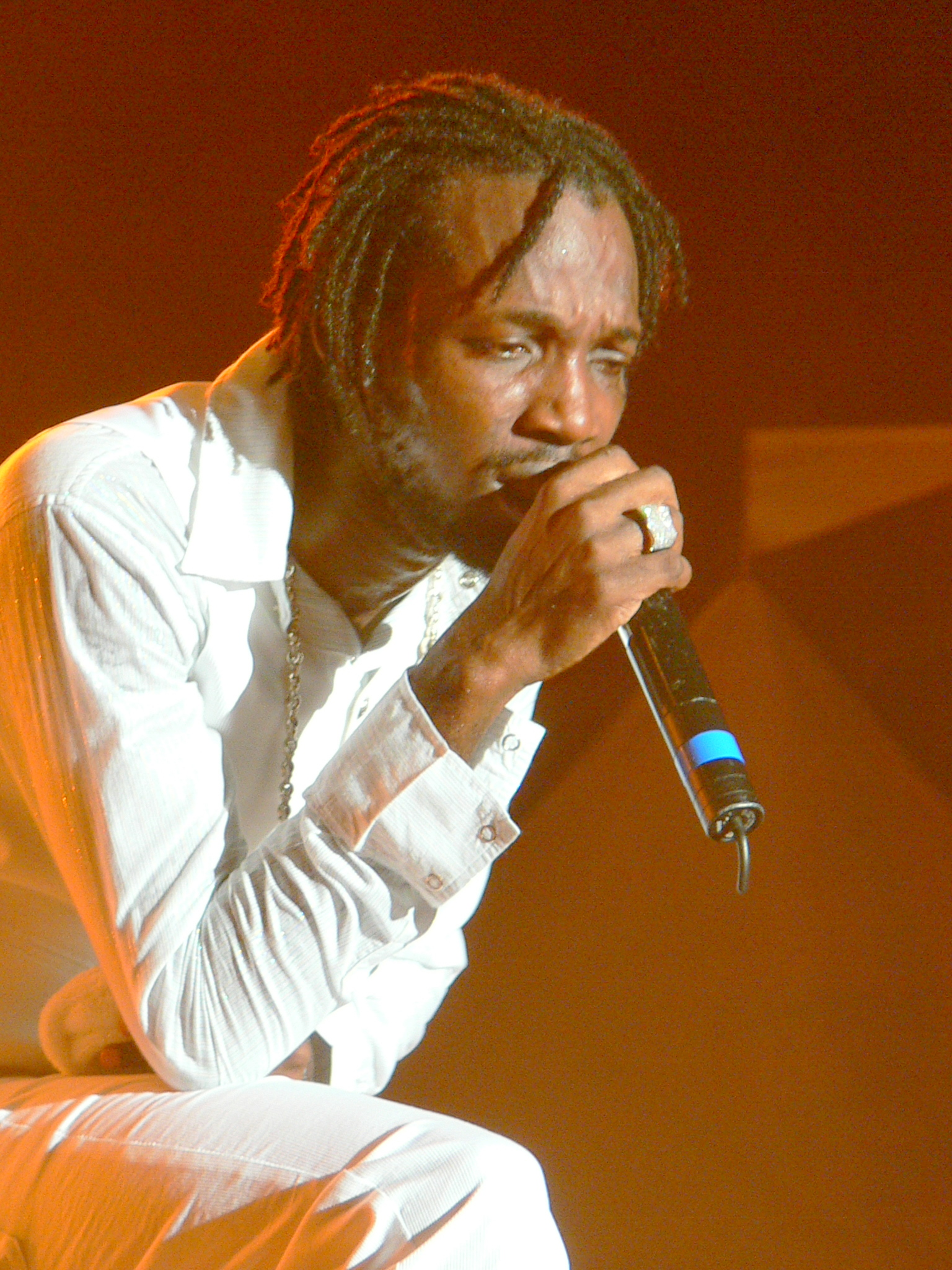
- Mavado performs on stage for Dancehall Night at Reggae Sumfest 2008
- Genre: Reggae, dancehall, hip hop, etc.
- Dates: mid-July
- Locations: Montego Bay, Jamaica
- Years active: 1993-present
- Founders: Summerfest Productions Limited Current Producers = DownSound Entertainment Ltd.
- Attendance: 30,000 plus
- Website: Official website

Reggae Sumfest is the largest music festival in Jamaica and the Caribbean, taking place each year in mid-July in Montego Bay. Sumfest started in 1993.

It attracts crowds of all ages from all over the world, and has featured a variety of Jamaican reggae artists such as Damian "Junior Gong" Marley and Stephen Marley, Ziggy Marley, Bunny Wailer, The Mighty Diamonds, Toots & the Maytals, Derrick Harriott, Leroy Sibbles, U-Roy, John Holt, Maxi Priest, Leroy Smart, Beres Hammond, Tony Rebel, Andy Vernon, Frankie Paul, and Freddie McGregor, dancehall stars like Barrington Levy, Vybz Kartel, Popcaan, Spice, Beenie Man, Bounty Killer, Elephant Man, Capleton, Sean Paul, Cranky Kong and Lady Saw as well as international artists including 50 Cent, Beyonce, Rihanna, Destiny's Child, Kanye West, Chris Brown, Nicki Minaj, Wiz Khalifa, and Usher.

Founders Summerfest Productions Limited sold the Reggae Sumfest Festival and trademark to Downsound Records in April 2016.

As is customary, Reggae Sumfest kicks off on Sunday with the Sumfest Beach Party now held at Tropical Bliss Beach, and followed on Monday with a free Street Dance held at Old Hospital Park on The Hip Strip, then followed by All White Party (dress code) held on Tuesday at Pier 1 On the Waterfront, followed by the Blitz Party on Wednesday, Global Sound Clash on Thursday at Pier One Event Centre, and then two nights of the Main Festival with live performances featuring the greatest Dancehall and Reggae Artists in the world, beginning with Dancehall Night on Friday (Dancehall), and Reggae Night on Saturday at the Catherine Hall Entertainment Complex.

== History ==
Robert Russell helped found the festival in 1993. He received an Order of Distinction award in 2017.

== See also ==
- Reggae Sunsplash
- List of reggae festivals
