= Great Is He =

Studio album by Popcaan
- Released: 27 January 2023
- Length: 57:04
- Label: OVO
- Producer: Anju Blaxx; Atto Wallace; Batundi; Dan Sky; Dane Ray; Demario Duncan; Dre Skull; Kid Culture; Mojam; Savchenko Anton; Steven Francisco; The Fanatix; TJ Records; Tresor; Wez

Popcaan chronology
Fixtape (2020)	Great Is He (2023)

Singles from Great Is He
- 1. "Skeleton Cartier" Released: 4 March 2022; 2. "Next to Me" Released: 30 November 2022; 3. "Set It" Released: 16 December 2022; 4. "We Caa Done" Released: 6 January 2023; 5. "Great Is He" Released: 20 January 2023

Professional ratings
Review scores
Source	Rating
Evening Standard	3/5 stars
NME	3/5 stars
Pitchfork	6.7/10
Rolling Stone	4/5 stars
The Guardian	2/5 stars

Great Is He is the fifth studio album by Jamaican singer Popcaan. It was released through OVO Sound on 27 January 2023. The album features guest appearances from Burna Boy, Chronic Law, Drake, and Toni-Ann Singh. Production was handled by Kid Culture, Demario Duncan, Dane Ray, The Fanatix, Anju Blaxx, Dre Skull, Tresor, Batundi, TJ Records, Dan Sky, Atto Wallace, Steven Francisco, Savchenko Anton, Mojam, and Wez. The album serves as the follow-up to Popcaan's previous album, Fixtape (2020).

== Release and promotion ==
Popcaan revealed the title of the album in early 2022, later promising a release date near the end of the year, which, however, did not happen. He revealed the cover art in early 2023. He revealed the tracklist exactly a week before its release date.

=== Singles ===
The lead single of the album, "Skeleton Cartier", was released on 4 March 2022. The second single, "Next to Me", was released on 30 November 2022. The third single, "Set It", was released on 16 December 2022. The fourth single, "We Caa Done", which features Canadian rapper and singer Drake, was released on 6 January 2023. The fifth and final single, the title track, was released on 20 January 2023.

== Track listing ==
Great Is He track listing
No.	Title	Writer(s)	Producer(s)	Length
1.	"Defeat the Struggle"	Andrae Sutherland; Daniel Hackett	Kid Culture	3:47
2.	"Freshness"	Sutherland; Demario Duncan; Waldane Hampton	Duncan; Dane Ray	4:03
3.	"Skeleton Cartier"	Sutherland; Adrian Francis; Curtis James	The Fanatix	3:42
4.	"Next to Me" (featuring Toni-Ann Singh)	Sutherland; Toni-Ann Singh; Andrew Myrie	Anju Blaxx	3:56
5.	"Teach Me"	Sutherland; Andrew Hershey	Dre Skull	2:27
6.	"Aboboyaa" (featuring Burna Boy)	Sutherland; Damini Ogulu; Myrie; Kurt Lewis	Anju Blaxx	2:47
7.	"11th Commandment"	Sutherland; Hampton; Nathaniel Brown	Dane Ray	3:39
8.	"We Caa Done" (featuring Drake)	Sutherland; Aubrey Graham; Tresor Riziki	Tresor; Batundi	4:05
9.	"Cry fi Yuh Body"	Sutherland; Hershey	Dre Skull	2:54
10.	"Set It"	Sutherland; Linton White; Ricardo Reid	TJ Records	2:35
11.	"New Benz"	Sutherland; Wesley Singerman; Hershey	Dre Skull	2:13
12.	"St. Thomas Native" (featuring Chronic Law)	Sutherland; Ackeme Campbell; Dan Sky; Atto Wallace; Madden Aubyn	Sky; Wallace	3:10
13.	"Wish No Bad"	Sutherland; Amilcar Smith; Steven Francisco	Smith; Francisco	3:14
14.	"Appreciation"	Sutherland; Wallace; Savchenko Anton	Wallace; Anton	3:34
15.	"Past Life"	Sutherland; Hampton; Brian Mitchell; Ryan Bevolo; Nicholas Lira	Dane Ray	4:17
16.	"Memories"	Sutherland; James Murray; Mustafa Omer	Mojam	3:20
17.	"Great Is He"	Sutherland; Murray; Omer; Amilcar Smith	Mojam; Wez^{[a]}	3:21

Notes

- ^{^[a]} signifies a co-producer
