= Where We Come From =

Studio album by Popcaan
- Released: 10 June 2014
- Genre: Dancehall; pop
- Label: Mixpak
- Producer: Dre Skull; Dubbel Dutch; Jaime YVP; Anju Blaxx; Adde Instrumentals

Popcaan chronology
Where We Come From (2014)	Forever (2018)

Where We Come From is the debut studio album by Jamaican dancehall artist Popcaan, released on 10 June 2014 by Mixpak Records. A prolific dancehall artist from Jamaica, Popcaan collaborated with several producers on the album: Dre Skull (who also served as the album's Executive Producer), Dubbel Dutch, Anju Blaxx, Jaime YVP and Adde Instrumentals.

"Where We Come From" received critical acclaim upon release, and placed on several year-end critics' lists for 2014. Upon release of the album, Popcaan was featured as the cover star on The Fader, garnered an 8.0 rating at Pitchfork, and received positive reviews from NPR, The Guardian, The Washington Post, Billboard, Dazed, Jamaican Observer, Complex, FACT, and more.

== Critical reception ==
Professional ratings
Aggregate scores
Source	Rating
Metacritic	81/100
Review scores
Source	Rating
AllMusic	4/5 stars
Exclaim!	8/10
Pitchfork	8.0/10
Wondering Sound	4/5 stars

Where We Come From received acclaim from music critics. At Metacritic, which assigns a normalised rating out of 100 to reviews from mainstream critics, the album received an average score of 81, which indicates "universal acclaim", based on 5 reviews.

Popcaan was praised for making his own mark on the dancehall genre. The Jamaican artist veers away from male posturing and bravado, instead producing an album that tackles important themes and demonstrates an emotional vulnerability on some of the more romantic numbers.

== Track listing ==
No.	Title	Writer(s)	Producer(s)	Length
1.	"Hold On"	Andrae Sutherland; Andrew Hershey	Dre Skull	3:59
2.	"Everything Nice"	Sutherland; Marc Glasser	Dubbel Dutch	4:17
3.	"Number One Freak"	Sutherland; Jamie Roberts	Jaime YVP	3:15
4.	"Love Yuh Bad"	Sutherland; Hershey	Dre Skull	3:41
5.	"The System"	Sutherland; Hershey	Dre Skull	3:02
6.	"Hustle" (featuring Pusha T)	Sutherland; Hershey; Terrence Thornton	Dre Skull	2:54
7.	"Waiting So Long"	Sutherland; Andreas Nilsson	Adde Instrumentals	3:07
8.	"Cool It"	Sutherland; Glasser	Dubbel Dutch	2:59
9.	"Ghetto (Tired of Crying)"	Sutherland; Hershey	Dre Skull	3:22
10.	"Evil"	Sutherland; Glasser	Dubbel Dutch	3:19
11.	"Addicted"	Sutherland; Glasser	Dubbel Dutch	3:54
12.	"Give Thanks"	Sutherland; Glasser	Dubbel Dutch	3:37
13.	"Where We Come From"	Sutherland; Andrew Myrie	Anjublaxx	4:02

== Charts ==
Chart (2014)	Peak position
US Heatseekers Albums (Billboard)	21
US Reggae Albums (Billboard)	2
