= Unguarded (Rae Morris album) =

Studio album by Rae Morris
- Released: 26 January 2015
- Recorded: 2012–14
- Genre: Art pop, synth-pop
- Length: 46:47
- Label: Atlantic
- Producer: Jim Eliot, Fryars, Ariel Rechtshaid

Rae Morris chronology
Unguarded (2015)	Someone Out There (2018)

Singles from Unguarded
- 1. "Don't Go" Released: 2012; 2. "Grow" Released: 2012; 3. "Do You Even Know?" Released: 6 May 2014; 4. "Cold" Released: 29 July 2014; 5. "Closer" Released: 17 October 2014; 6. "Under the Shadows" Released: 11 January 2015; 7. "Love Again" Released: 4 May 2015

Unguarded is the debut studio album by English singer and songwriter Rae Morris, released on 26 January 2015 by Atlantic Records.

The album was streamed in its entirety on the website of DIY magazine ahead of its release.

== Critical reception ==
Professional ratings
Aggregate scores
Source	Rating
Metacritic	77/100
Review scores
Source	Rating
AllMusic	4/5 stars
DIY	4/5 stars
Drowned in Sound	8/10
The Guardian	3/5 stars
Digital Spy	5/5 stars
The Observer	3/5 stars

The album received favourable reviews in publications such as Digital Spy, DIY magazine, Drowned in Sound, The Guardian and The Observer. XFM named Unguarded its 'Album of the Week' at the end of January 2015.

== Track listing ==
No.	Title	Writer(s)	Producer(s)	Length
1.	"Skin"	Rae Morris, Dan Carey	Ariel Rechtshaid	3:47
2.	"Under the Shadows"	Morris, Jim Eliot	Jim Eliot	3:50
3.	"Closer"	Morris, Tom Hull	Rechtshaid	3:49
4.	"For You"	Morris, Rechtshaid, Simon Robbs	Rechtshaid	3:50
5.	"Love Again"	Morris, Eliot	Eliot, Fryars	3:55
6.	"Don't Go"	Morris	Rechtshaid	3:32
7.	"Unguarded"	Morris, Dan Wilson	Fryars	3:54
8.	"Cold" (feat. Fryars)	Morris, Benjamin Garrett	Fryars	3:57
9.	"Do You Even Know?"	Morris	Rechtshaid	3:40
10.	"Morne Fortune"	Morris	Eliot	3:59
11.	"This Time"	Morris	Rechtshaid	3:50
12.	"Not Knowing"	Morris, Dominic Salole	Rechtshaid	4:44

iTunes edition bonus tracks
No.	Title	Writer(s)	Length
13.	"Grow" (feat. Tom Odell)	Morris	4:22
14.	"All You Need Is Love (Pre-Order Only)"	Lennon, McCartney	2:49

== Charts ==
Chart (2015)	Peak position
UK Albums (OCC)	9

== Release history ==
Region	Release date	Format	Label	Ref
United Kingdom	26 January 2015	CD; digital download; vinyl	Atlantic	
