= Fixtape =

Studio album by Popcaan
- Released: 7 August 2020
- Length: 64:39
- Label: October's Very Own; Warner
- Producer: Andre "Spider" Dennis; Boi-1da; Borial Thomas; Christopher James Hamer; Dane Ray; Jam 2; Jaxx Records; JoshSkull; Kirk "Louie Vito" Clarke; KraiGGi BaDArT; London on da Track; Markus Records; Mini E5; Nineteen85; Noel Cadastre; Popcaan; Stephen Hicham Ched-di; The Fanatix; TJ Records; Two4kay

Popcaan chronology
Vanquish (2019)	Fixtape (2020)	Great Is He (2023)

Singles from Fixtape
- 1. "Mamakita" Released: 27 March 2020; 2. "Buzz" Released: 29 May 2020; 3. "Twist & Turn" Released: 1 September 2020

Professional ratings
Review scores
Source	Rating
AllMusic	4/5 stars
Pitchfork	8.3/10

Fixtape is the fourth studio album by Jamaican musician Popcaan. It was released on 7 August 2020 via OVO Sound and Warner Records. Production was handled by several record producers, including Boi-1da, London on da Track, Nineteen85, Noel Cadastre and Popcaan himself. It features guest appearances from Drake, Dane Ray, Frahcess One, French Montana, Jada Kingdom, Masicka, PartyNextDoor, Preme, Stylo G and Tommy Lee. The album peaked at number 15 on the Canadian Albums Chart and at number 94 on the Billboard 200. It was promoted by two pre-released singles: "Mamakita" and "Buzz", while "Twist & Turn" features Drake and PartyNextDoor and was released as the third single by being sent to urban contemporary radio on 1 September.

== Track listing ==
Fixtape track listing
No.	Title	Writer(s)	Producer(s)	Length
1.	"Chill"	Andrae Hugh Sutherland	Alvin Brown Beats	3:27
2.	"Buzz"	A. Sutherland; Damian Gager; Remmel Brown	Mini E5; Two4kay	2:37
3.	"Fresh Polo" (featuring Stylo G and Dane Ray)	A. Sutherland; Andrian Francis; Curtis James; Mark Waxkirsh; Gager	Mini E5; The Fanatix	3:08
4.	"Twist & Turn" (featuring Drake and PartyNextDoor)	A. Sutherland; Aubrey Graham; Jahron Brathwaite; Paul Jefferies	Nineteen85	4:20
5.	"Mamakita"	A. Sutherland; Linton White; Mark Collinder	TJ Records	3:22
6.	"Goodaz Gal"	A. Sutherland; Jammy James; Andre Dennis	Jam 2; Spider	4:51
7.	"Canary"	A. Sutherland; Darren Jack; Markus Myrie	Jaxx Records; Markus Records	3:21
8.	"Rapid"	A. Sutherland; Waldane Hampton	Dane Ray	3:24
9.	"Unda Dirt" (featuring Masicka and Tommy Lee)	A. Sutherland; Christopher James Hamer; Stephen Hicham Ched-di; Gager	Mini E5; Christopher James Hamer; Stephen Hicham Ched-di	3:18
10.	"Any One a Dem" (featuring Frahcess One)	A. Sutherland; Francis; James; Waxkirsh; Gager	Mini E5; The Fanatix	3:16
11.	"All I Need" (featuring Drake)	A. Sutherland; Graham; Noel Cadastre; Dwayne Chin-Quee; A. Reid	Noel Cadastre	2:58
12.	"Suh Me Luv It" (featuring Jada Kingdom)	A. Sutherland; Matthew Samuels; J. Murphy	Boi-1da	4:13
13.	"Bruck Di Buddy"	A. Sutherland; Hampton	Dane Ray; Popcaan	3:26
14.	"Murda" (featuring Preme and French Montana)	A. Sutherland; Raynford Humphrey; Karim Kharbouch; London Holmes	London on da Track	3:21
15.	"Jealousy Die Slow"	A. Sutherland; Kirk Clarke	Kirk "Louie Vito" Clarke	2:50
16.	"Friends Like These"	A. Sutherland; R. Douglas Evans	Popcaan	3:28
17.	"Retribution"	A. Sutherland; Borial Thomas; K. Daley	Borial Thomas; Popcaan	2:28
18.	"Bank & God"	A. Sutherland; Rasheed Sutherland	JoshSkull	3:23
19.	"My Way"	A. Sutherland; Charles Doran; Clarke	Kirk "Louie Vito" Clarke; KraiGGi BaDArT	3:28
Total length:				64:39

== Personnel ==
Vocalists

- Andrae Hugh "Popcaan" Sutherland – primary artist
- Waldane "Dane Ray" Hampton – featured artist (track 3)
- Jason "Stylo G" McDermott – featured artist (track 3)
- Jahron "PartyNextDoor" Brathwaite – featured artist (track 4)
- Aubrey Drake Graham – featured artist (tracks: 4, 11)
- Masicka – featured artist (track 9)
- Tommy Lee – featured artist (track 9)
- Frahcess One – featured artist (track 10)
- Jada Kingdom – featured artist (track 12)
- Raynford "Preme" Humphrey – featured artist (track 14)
- Karim "French Montana" Kharbouch – featured artist (track 14)

Instrumentalists

- Andrae Hugh Sutherland – keyboards & programming (tracks: 1, 13, 16, 17)
- Damian "Mini E5" Gager – keyboards & programming (tracks: 2, 3, 9, 10)
- Remmel "Two4Kay" Brown – keyboards & programming (track 2)
- Andrian Francis – keyboards & programming (tracks: 3, 10)
- Curtis James – keyboards & programming (tracks: 3, 10)
- Mark Waxkirsh – keyboards & programming (tracks: 3, 10)
- Paul "Nineteen85" Jefferies – keyboards & programming (track 4)
- Linton "TJ Records" White – keyboards & programming (track 5)
- Jammy "Jam 2" James – keyboards & programming (track 6)
- Andre "Spider" Dennis – keyboards & programming (track 6)
- Markus "Markus Records" Myrie – keyboards & programming (track 7)
- Darren "Jaxx Records" Jack – keyboards & programming (track 7)
- Waldane Hampton – keyboards & programming (tracks: 8, 13)
- Christopher James Hamer – keyboards & programming (track 9)
- Stephen Hicham Ched-di – keyboards & programming (track 9)
- Noel Cadastre – keyboards & programming (track 11)
- Matthew "Boi-1da" Samuels – keyboards & programming (track 12)
- London "London on da Track" Holmes – keyboards & programming (track 14)
- Kirk "Louie Vito" Clarke – keyboards & programming (tracks: 15, 19)
- Borial Thomas – keyboards & programming (track 17)
- Rasheed "JoshSkull" Sutherland – keyboards & programming (track 18)
- Charles "Kraiggi Badart" Doran – keyboards & programming (track 19)
- Noah "40" Shebib – additional arranger (track 4)
- Dwayne "Supa Dups" Chin-Quee – additional instrumentation (track 11)

Production

- Popcaan – producer (tracks: 1, 13, 16, 17)
- Damian "Mini E5" Gager – producer (tracks: 2, 3, 9, 10)
- Remmel "Two4Kay" Brown – producer (track 2)
- Andrian Francis – producer (tracks: 3, 10)
- Curtis James – producer (tracks: 3, 10)
- Mark Waxkirsh – producer (tracks: 3, 10)
- Paul "Nineteen85" Jefferies – producer (track 4)
- Linton "TJ Records" White – producer (track 5)
- Jammy "Jam 2" James – producer (track 6)
- Andre "Spider" Dennis – producer (track 6)
- Markus "Markus Records" Myrie – producer (track 7)
- Darren "Jaxx Records" Jack – producer (track 7)
- Dane Ray – producer (tracks: 8, 13)
- Christopher James Hamer – producer (track 9)
- Stephen Hicham Ched-di – producer (track 9)
- Noel Cadastre – producer (track 11)
- Matthew "Boi-1da" Samuels – producer (track 12)
- London Holmes – producer (track 14)
- Kirk "Louie Vito" Clarke – producer (tracks: 15, 19)
- Borial Thomas – producer (track 17)
- Rasheed "JoshSkull" Sutherland – producer (track 18)
- Charles "Kraiggi Badart" Doran – producer (track 19)
- Noah "40" Shebib – vocal producer (track 4)
- Taranchyla – vocal producer (track 11)

Technicals

- Dale "Dizzle" Virgo – mixing (tracks: 1, 3, 6, 9, 18), mastering (tracks: 2, 5)
- Remmel "Two4Kay" Brown – mixing (track 2)
- Noah "40" Shebib – mixing (track 4)
- Mark Collinder – mixing (track 5)
- Dre Day – mixing (track 7)
- Waldane "Dane Ray" Hampton – mixing (tracks: 8, 13, 15, 16), recording (tracks: 1–5, 8, 9, 12–16), mastering (track 15)
- Noel Cadastre – mixing (track 11), recording (tracks: 4, 11)
- Jaycen Joshua – mixing (track 12)
- Amir "AmirJamm" Jammalieh – mixing (track 14)
- Dohnzhey "Sasaine" Grindley – mixing & recording & mastering (track 17)
- Jacob Richards – assistant mixing (track 12)
- Mike Seaberg – assistant mixing (track 12)
- DJ Riggins – assistant mixing (track 12)
- Prep Bijan – recording (track 4)
- Jammy "Jam 2" James – recording (track 6)
- Markus Myrie – recording (track 7)
- Marlon Easy – recording (track 18)
- Kirk "Louie Vito" Clarke – recording (track 19)
- Chris Athens – mastering (tracks: 1, 3, 4, 6–11, 13, 14, 16, 18, 19)
- Dave Huffman – assistant mastering (tracks: 1, 3, 4, 6–11, 13, 14, 16, 18, 19)

== Charts ==
Chart performance for Fixtape
Chart (2020)	Peak position
Canadian Albums (Billboard)	15
US Billboard 200	94
US Reggae Albums (Billboard)	2
