= Suku Park =

South Korean artist

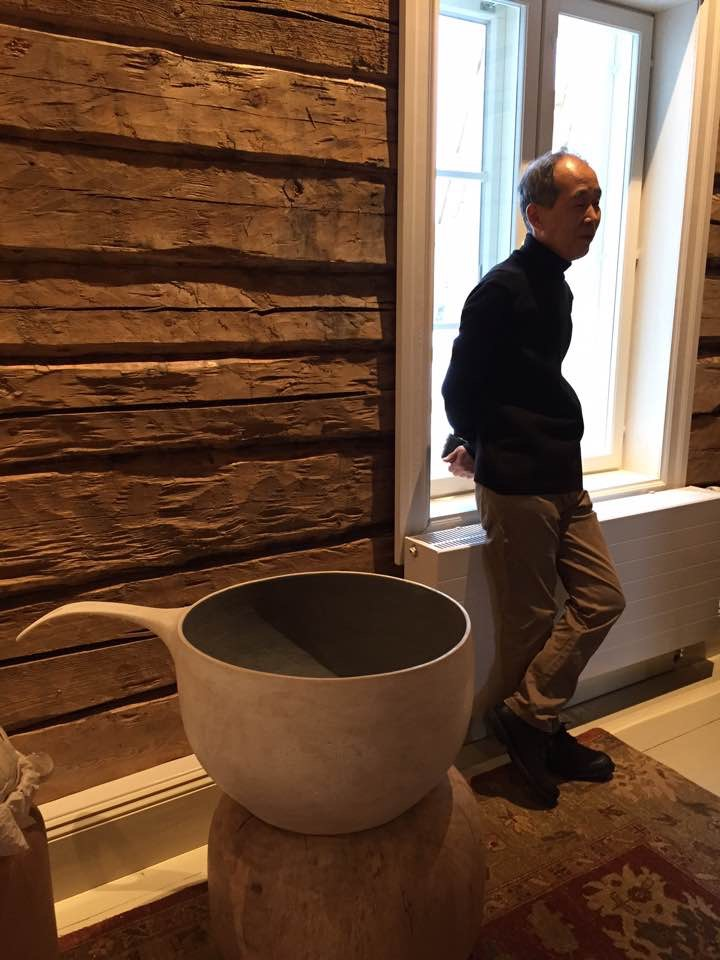
- Born: March 29, 1947 (age 78); Seoul, South Korea
- Known for: Ceramic Art
- Movement: Contemporary Ceramic Art

Korean name
- Hangul: 박석우
- RR: Bak Seoku
- MR: Pak Sŏgu

Suck-Woo Park (born 1947), also known as Suku Park, is a South Korean contemporary ceramic artist and a council member of the International Academy of Ceramics (IAC).

== Early life and education ==
Park was born in Seoul in 1947 and attended the Fine Arts College of the Seoul National University in South Korea (1966–1970) before moving to Stockholm, Sweden in 1974 to graduate from the Swedish State School of Arts & Design (Konstfack).

== Work ==
In early 1980s Suku Park was the art director for Pentik and lived with his family in Posio, Finland. He worked there 1984-1987 and has since his international career returned to Posio in 2011. In 1984 Suku Park moved his studio and his family to Espoo, and later in 1997 was one of the first members of Onoma (The Cooperative of Artisans, Designers and Artists in Fiskars).

Park's international career began from Posio and he has since exhibited in multiple countries with collections amongst others in the Nationalmuseum in Stockholm, Museum of Painting and Sculpture in Istanbul and Musée Ariana in Geneva. Park was a professor at Sangmyung University in Seoul, South Korea from early 2000 and has since moved back to Finland and Lapland where he lives and works.

On Posio and living in Finland affecting his work, Park stated that "My language of form and expression is not Korean, but a reaction inside myself to form things with my own hands in order to give an object its own character. When I'm designing I'm thinking function, but I'm thinking humour too". He continues that his works is influenced by the environment and was fascinated with Posio and the focus he could have there.

Park is the council member of IAC in Geneva, Switzerland, member of Konsthantverkarna, Stockholm, Sweden, Ceramic Group Kuusi, Finland.

== Exhibitions ==
Park's selected solo exhibitions include: Anthony Shaw Gallery, London, United Kingdom (1978); Lotte Gallery, Seoul, South Korea (1980); Retretti Art Center, Retretti, Finland (1985); Illums Bolighus, Copenhagen, Denmark (1985); Norway Design Center, Oslo, Norway (1985); Konsthantverkarna, Stockholm, Sweden (1986, 1989); Andrew Shire Gallery, Los Angeles, United States (1990); Mikimoto Art Hall, Ginza, Tokyo, Japan (1989, 1992); SSamjigil Seoul, South Korea; Gallery Park Ryusook Seoul, South Korea; Reuchinhaus, Pforzheim, Germany and Galerie Marian Heller Sandhausen, Germany; Mokkumto Gallery, Seoul, South Korea; and Tong-in Gallery, New York City, United States.

== Collections ==
Park's contemporary ceramic art pieces are held at:

- The Victoria and Albert Museum, London, United Kingdom
- The British Crafts Council, London, United Kingdom
- National Museum of Scotland, Edinburgh, United Kingdom
- Nationalmuseum, Stockholm, Sweden
- National Museum Of Contemporary Art, Seoul, South Korea
- Malmö Museum, Malmo, Sweden
- Röhsska Museum, Gothenburg, Sweden
- Museum Of Painting and Sculpture, Istanbul, Turkey
- Musée Ariana, Geneva, Switzerland
- Museum of Decorative Art, Prague, Czech Republic
- Museum of International Ceramics, Bechyne, Czech Republic
- Museum of Porcelain, Loket, Czech Republic
- Iris Collection, Porvoo, Finland
- Coffee Cup Museum, Posio, Finland
- Youngone Plaza, Seoul, South Korea
- Total Museum, Seoul, South Korea
- Daeyoo Cultural Foundation, South Korea
- Royal Ontario Museum, Toronto, Canada
- Ceramic and Glass Gallery, Waterloo, Canada
