= Mixpak Records =

- Founded: 2009
- Founder: Dre Skull
- Genre: Dancehall
- Country of origin: U.S.
- Location: Brooklyn, New York
- Official website: www.mixpakrecords.com

Mixpak Records is a Brooklyn-based independent record label, founded in 2009 by record producer Dre Skull. The label operates across a range of genres, from dancehall to underground club music, experimental electronic, rap and leftfield pop. Mixpak has released music by Vybz Kartel, Popcaan, Palmistry, Murlo, and Jubilee, among others.

== History ==
Mixpak was started by producer and musician Dre Skull in 2009 as a multi-genre label encompassing music from across the world. The label's early years saw releases spanning dancehall, synth pop, UK funky house, punk, and more.

In 2011, following a trip to Jamaica, Mixpak released its first full-length album: Kingston Story by Vybz Kartel, featuring the singles “Yuh Love”, “Go Go Wine”, and “Half on a Baby”. The album reached number seven on the Billboard Reggae Albums chart and received coverage in outlets such as Pitchfork and the New York Times.

Subsequent releases on Mixpak struck a balance between dancehall riddims and releases from emerging electronic and experimental artists such as Jubilee, Dubbel Dutch, and Murlo.

In 2012, Mixpak began working with Vybz Kartel’s then protege Popcaan and subsequently signed him to a multi album deal.

On June 10, 2014, Mixpak released Popcaan’s debut album, Where We Come From. The release entered the Billboard Reggae Chart at number two and spawned the singles “Everything Nice” and “Love Yuh Bad”. The album received critical acclaim across the board and in 2016 “Love Yuh Bad” was sampled by Drake on “Too Good” feat. Rihanna.

In 2016, Mixpak won Red Bull Culture Clash in London, defeating Wiz Khalifa, UKG Allstars and Wiley's Eskimo Dance for the trophy. The surprise victory catapulted Mixpak to greater visibility and led to them being ranked among the top labels of the year by many. They continued to release acclaimed full-length albums by Palmistry, Jubilee, and Gaika as well as EPs by Murlo and Wildlife! Jubilee's album was ranked among the best electronic releases of the year by Billboard and Pitchfork.

Mixpak released Popcaan's second album Forever on July 20, 2018. It was preceded by the singles "Body So Good", "Wine For Me" and "Firm And Strong".

As well as releasing records, Mixpak throws a series of parties in New York City and hosts a monthly show on Red Bull Radio. They have a recording studio complex in Brooklyn, New York.

== Discography ==
=== Releases ===
Mixpak Records Discography
Release date	Artists	Title	Format	Catalogue
2018	Popcaan	Forever	Digital Download	MIX071
2018	Popcaan	Wine For Me	Digital Download	MIX070
2018	Popcaan	Firm and Strong	Digital Download	MIX069
2018	Popcaan	Body So Good	Digital Download	MIX068
2018	Florentino	Fragmentos	Digital Download	MIX067
2018	Vybz Kartel	Real Bad Gal	Digital Download	MIX066
2017	Wildlife!	Anima	Digital Download	MIX064
2017	Murlo	Club Coil	Digital Download, 12"	MIX063
2016	Jubilee	After Hours	Digital Download, 12"	MIX061
2016	Konshens	Don't Worry	Digital Download	MIX062
2016	Wildlife!	Patterns	Digital Download	MIX059
2016	Palmistry	Pagan	Digital Download, 12"	MIX060
2016	Gaika	Security	Digital Download	MIXT001
2015	Murlo	Odyssey	Digital Download, 12"	MIX058
2015	Konshens	Gal Ting Remix feat. Patoranking	Digital Download	MIX055P
2015	Mr One Hundred	Calypso Fugitive	Digital Download	MIX057
2015	Palmistry	Memory Taffeta	Digital Download	MIX056
2015	Dre Skull Presents…	Black Light Riddim feat. QQ, Tifa, Konshens, Spice	Digital Download	MIX055
2015	Wildlife!	Feverpitch EP	Digital Download	MIX054
2015	Jubilee	Jealous EP	Digital Download	MIX053
2015	Murlo	Jasmine feat. Gemma Dunleavy	Digital Download	MIX052
2014	Various Artists	PAK MAN Compilation	Digital Download	MIX051
2014	Palmistry	Protector SE5	Digital Download	MIX050
2014	Popcaan	Where We Come From	Digital Download, LP, CD	MIX049
2014	Jubiliee	JMZ Riddim	Digital Download	MIX048
2014	Popcaan	Love Yuh Bad	Digital Download	MIX047
2014	Mr One Hundred	Palm Tree Destruction EP feat. Bunji Garlin, Fay Ann Lyons, Machel Montano	Digital Download	MIX046
2014	Koyote	I Stand Accused EP	Digital Download	MIX045
2014	Jubilee	Pull Ova EP	Digital Download	MIX044
2013	Famous Eno Presents…	Gypsy Riddim feat. Rubi Dan, Trigga Nom, Serocee	Digital Download	MIX043
2013	Dre Skull	First Time (Remixes)	Digital Download	MIX042
2013	Dubbel Dutch	Cloud Club EP	Digital Download	MIX041
2013	Palmistry	Catch	Digital Download	MIX040
2013	Popcaan	Everything Nice (Remix feat. Mavado)	Digital Download	MIX039R
2013	Popcaan	Everything Nice	Digital Download	MIX039
2013	Murlo & Famous Eno	Ariel	Digital Download	MIX038
2013	Douster	Inna Style N Fashion Riddims	Digital Download	MIX037R
2013	Douster	Inna Style N Fashion feat. Kantana, Kari Jess, Cee Gee	Digital Download	MIX037
2013	Dre Skull	First Time feat. Megan James & Popcaan	Digital Download	MIX036
2013	Various Artists	Mixpak Pressure: Volume Two Compilation	Digital Download	MIX035
2012	Dubbel Dutch	Self Help Riddims EP	Digital Download	MIX034
2012	Dubbel Dutch	Self Help Riddim	Digital Download	MIX033
2012	Various Artists	Mixpak Pressure: Volume One Compilation	Digital Download	MIX032
2012	Various Artists (Dre Skull Presents…)	Kling Klang Riddim feat. Beenie Man, Suku, Deva Bratt, Tifa	Digital Download	MIX031
2012	Andy Petr	Obsession EP	Digital Download	MIX030
2012	Famous Eno	All Good FM EP	Digital Download	MIX029
2012	Various Artist (Dre Skull Presents…)	Loudspeaker Riddim feat. Beenie Man, Natalie Storm, Machel Montano, Popcaan	Digital Download	MIX028
2012	Koyote	Blowin’ My Mind EP	Digital Download	MIX027
2012	Jubilee	Pop It! EP	Digital Download	MIX026
2012	Popcaan	Get Gyal Easy (Remixes)	Digital Download	MIX025
2012	Popcaan	Get Gyal Easy	Digital Download	MIX024
2012	Poirier	Soca Road EP	Digital Download	MIX023
2011	Dubbel Dutch	Hymn EP	Digital Download	MIX022
2011	Vybz Kartel	Half On A Baby (Remix) feat. Pusha T	Digital Download	MIX021T
2011	Vybz Kartel	Half On A Baby (Remixes)	Digital Download	MIX021
2011	Koyote	Midsummer Tales (Remixes)	Digital Download	MIX020
2011	Melé	Starlight EP	Digital Download	MIX029
2011	Schlachthofbronx	Mudders EP	Digital Download	MIX018
2011	Vybz Kartel	Kingston Story	Digital Download, LP, CD	MIX017
2011	Andy Petr	Rapper Turned Singer EP	Digital Download	MIX016
2011	Vybz Kartel	Go Go Wine EP	Digital Download	MIX015
2011	Lil Scrappy	Look At Me (Remixes)	Digital Download	MIX014
2011	Koyote	Midsummer Tales EP	Digital Download	MIX013
2012	Hard Nips	Hard Nips EP	Digital Download, 12"	MIX012
2010	Lil Scrappy	Look At Me EP	Digital Download	MIX011
2010	Cory Blaine	Hot Plate EP	Digital Download, 12”	MIX010
2010	Warrior One	Lord Of Bashy EP	Digital Download	MIX009
2010	Melé	Bombay EP	Digital Download, 12"	MIX008
2010	Ms Thing & Psycho Tanbad	Bonify EP	Digital Download	MIX007
2009	Sissy Nobby	Lay Me Down (Remixes)	Digital Download	MIX006
2009	Sticky	Jumeriah Riddim	Digital Download	MIX005
2009	Vybz Kartel	Yuh Love EP	Digital Download	MIX004
2009	Sissy Nobby	Lay Me Down EP	Digital Download, 12”	MIX003
2009	Dre Skull	I Want You EP	Digital Download, 12”	MIX002
2009	Dre Skull feat. Sizzla	Gone Too Far EP	Digital Download, 12”	MIX001

== Roster ==
- Andy Petr
- Beenie Man
- Cory Blaine
- Deva Bratt
- Douster
- Dre Skull
- Dubbel Dutch
- Famous Eno
- Gaika
- Hard Nips
- Jubilee
- Konshens
- Koyote
- Lil Scrappy
- Machel Montano
- MC Buzzz
- Melé
- Mr One Hundred
- Ms. Thing
- Murlo
- Natalie Storm
- Palmistry
- Poirier
- Popcaan
- Psycho Tanbad
- QQ
- Schlachthofbronx
- Sissy Nobby
- Sizzla
- Sticky
- Suku
- Tifa
- Tortur3 T
- Vybz Kartel
- Warrior One
- Wildlife!
