= Fryars =

English musician

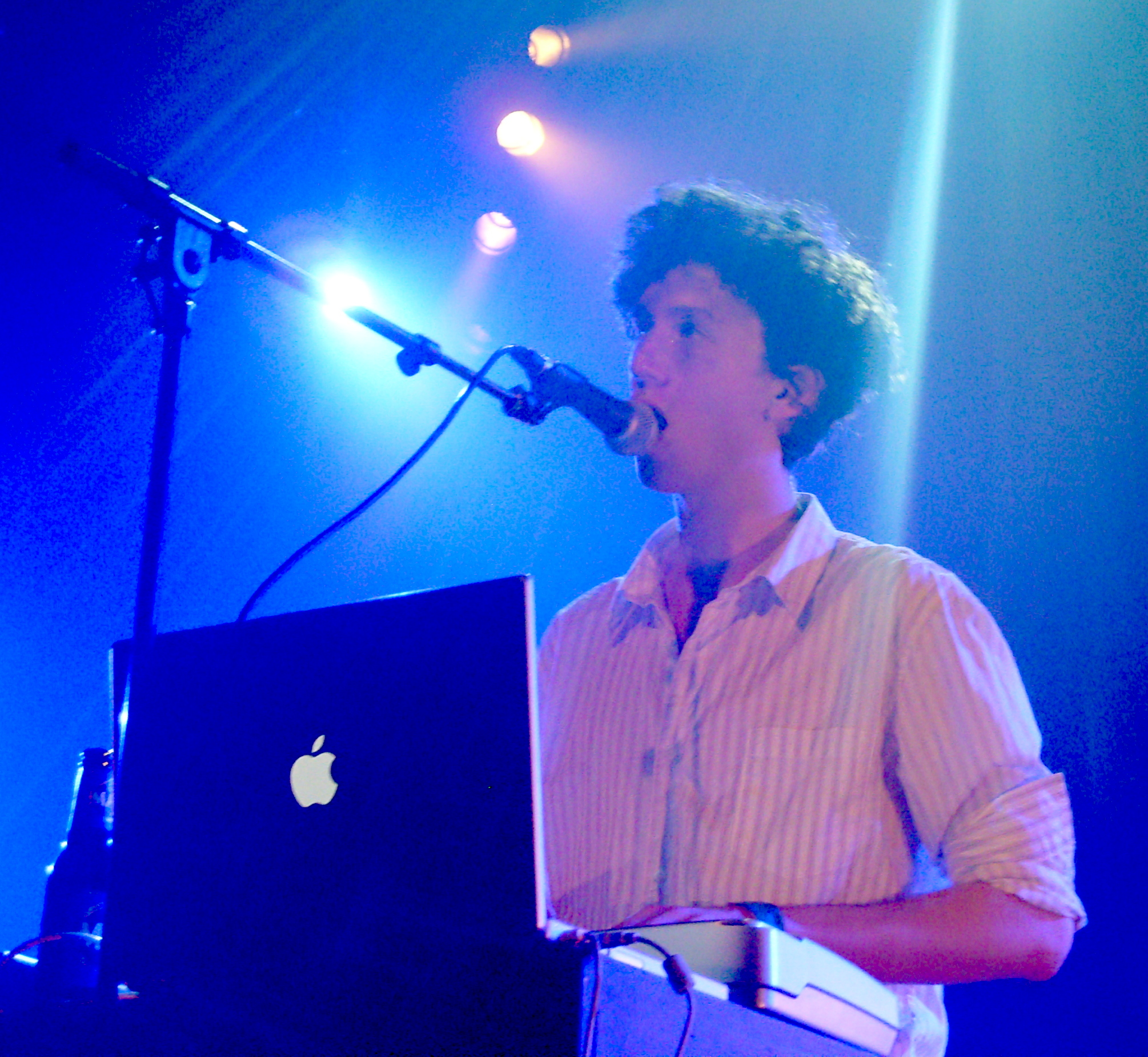
- Fryars in 2015

Background information
- Born: Benjamin James Harry Jack Garrett; 1988 or 1989 (age 37–38)
- Origin: London, United Kingdom
- Genres: Art pop Synthpop; Baroque pop
- Occupations: Singer, songwriter, producer
- Years active: 2007–present
- Labels: Make Mine, 679, Fiction
- Website: fryars.co.uk

Benjamin James Harry Jack Garrett, better known by his stage name Fryars (sometimes stylised frYars), is an English art pop musician from London.

== Career ==
Fryars released his debut EP, The Ides, in September 2007, and was profiled as The Guardian's "New band of the week" in November. A second EP, The Perfidy, followed in March 2008. His debut album, Dark Young Hearts, was released in September 2009; its first single, "Visitors", features backing vocals from Dave Gahan of Depeche Mode. In October 2012, Fryars issued the song "Love So Cold" online as a free download, followed by the EP In My Arms in January 2013 via 679 Recordings.

In October 2013, 679 released Fryars' EP Radio PWR, which was accompanied by a series of live shows devised with magician Simon Drake. Fryars' second album, Power', which he produced with Luke Smith (formerly of the band Clor) and Rodaidh McDonald, was released in November 2014 through Fiction Records. It followed a lengthy period of what he referred to as "record label limbo", during which he was released from 679 amid the acquisition of parent company Warner Music Group by Access Industries. He described the album as "a soundtrack to a film that does not exist", and released a "B-movie" in the form of an accompanying mixtape titled The Boy in the Hood, as well as developing social media profiles for its characters. Power received positive reviews from Dazed & Confused, The Guardian, and NME.

Fryars' musical influences include David Bowie, Serge Gainsbourg, Kraftwerk, and The Strokes. As a songwriter and producer for other artists, he has contributed to albums including Mika's The Origin of Love (2012), Lily Allen's Sheezus (2014), and Rae Morris's Unguarded (2015); he was additionally featured on Morris's 2014 single "Cold". They entered a relationship during their collaboration on Unguarded.

He co-wrote the song "Johanna" with Miles Kane and Mark Ronson for the film Mortdecai (2015). Fryars is affiliated with Universal Music Publishing Group. He released a new album in 2021 titled God Melodies.

== Discography ==
=== Studio albums ===
- Dark Young Hearts (2009)
- Power (2014)
- God Melodies (2021)

=== Extended plays ===
- The Ides (2007)
- The Perfidy (2008)
- In My Arms (2013)
- Radio PWR (2013)

=== Mixtapes ===
- The Boy in the Hood (2014)

Track listing
No.	Title	Length
1.	"Voice Memo 42"
2.	"On Your Own Pt. 2"
3.	"Wun.."
4.	"Quaalude No. 1 in C Sharp Major"
5.	"Vultures of the Night"
6.	"Wedding Crasher (Parts I & II)"
7.	"/*Voice Memo (Bith)"
8.	"Boys in the Hood"
9.	"Yoni"
10.	"Motorhome (Frymix)"
11.	"Down.On.It."
12.	"20130221 121310"
13.	"Mystic Pizza"
14.	"Back 2 Mine"
15.	"Knock Em Dead"
16.	"Ma Gismo"
17.	"Voice Memo"
18.	"King Many Layers" (featuring Lily Allen)
19.	"Voice Memo"
20.	"Voice Memo (Orleans)"

=== Singles ===
- "The Ides" (2009)
- "Olive Eyes" (2009)
- "Visitors" (2009)
- "Love So Cold" (2012)
- "In My Arms" (2013)
- "On Your Own" (2013)
- "Cool Like Me" (2013)
- "The Power" (2013)
- "Prettiest Ones Fly Highest" (2014)

=== Remixes ===
- Love Is All – "Felt Tip" (2009)
- Pacific – "Sunset Blvd" (2009)
- OneRepublic – "If I Lose Myself" (2013)
- alt-J – "Dissolve Me" (2013)
- Local Natives – "Heavy Feet" (2013)
- Fyfe – "Conversations" (2013)
- Josh Record – "Bones" (2013)
- Swim Deep – "King City" (2013)
- The 1975 – "Robbers" (2014)
- Seinabo Sey – "Hard Time" (2014)
- Lucy Rose - "Second Chance" (2018)

== Personal life ==
Fryars is married to the pop singer Rae Morris. They have two children.
