= Popcaan =

Jamaican dancehall singer (born 1988)

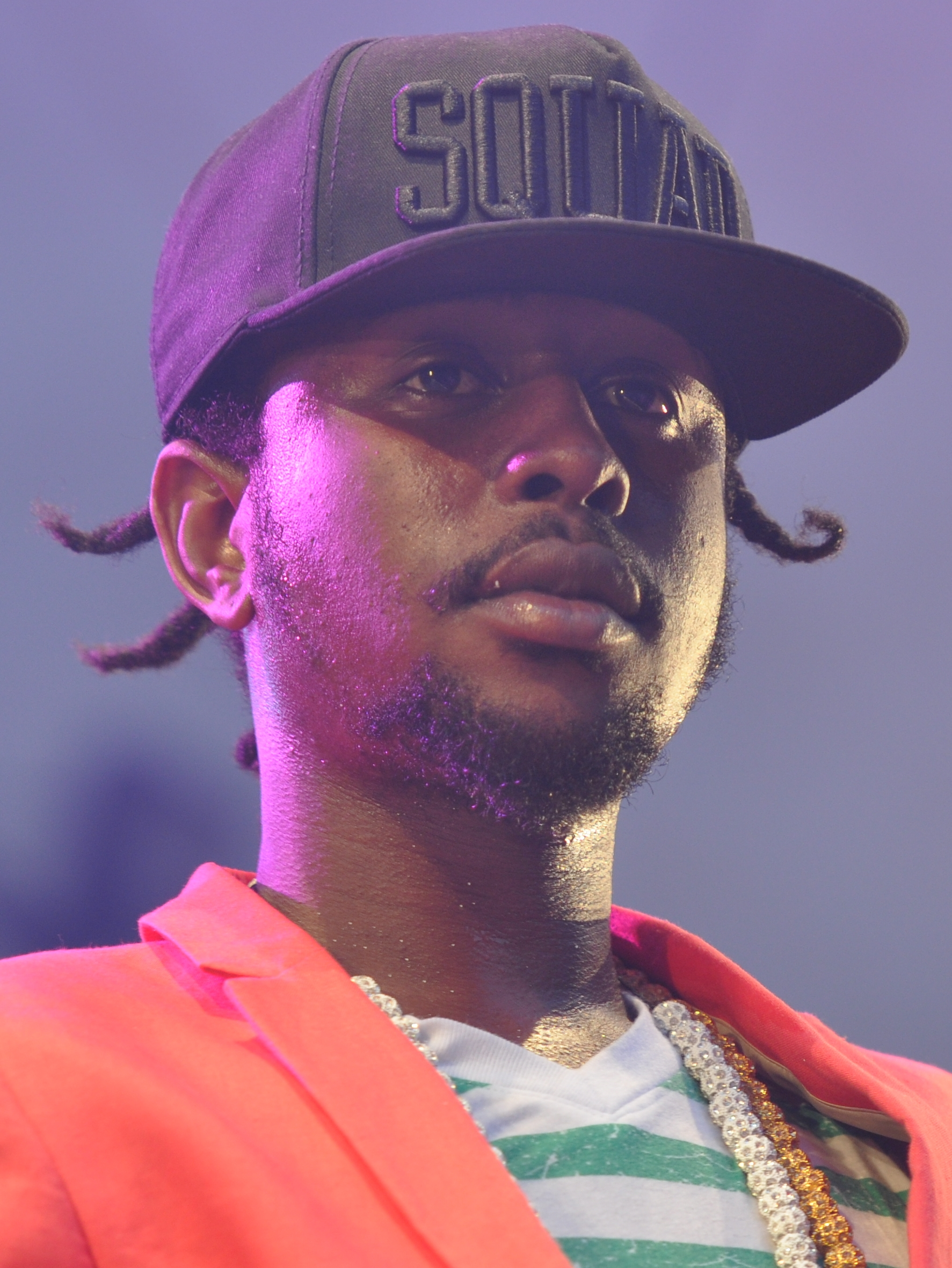
- Popcaan performing at Summerjam in 2013

Background information
- Born: Andrae Hugh Sutherland; 19 July 1988 (age 38); Saint Thomas Parish, Jamaica
- Origin: Portmore, Jamaica
- Genre: Dancehall
- Occupations: Singer; songwriter
- Works: Popcaan discography
- Years active: 2007–present
- Labels: Unruly Boys; Mixpak; OVO Sound; Warner
- Website: officialpopcaan.com

Andrae Hugh Sutherland (born 19 July 1988), known professionally as Popcaan, is a Jamaican dancehall singer.

In 2008, Popcaan joined Vybz Kartel's Gaza Music Empire. In 2010, he released his breakthrough international hit "Clarks" with Kartel, an ode to the shoe brand. In 2013, Popcaan signed with Mixpak Records and released his debut studio album, Where We Come From. In 2016, Popcaan signed with Canadian rapper Drake's record label OVO Sound and Warner Records. His second album for Mixpak, entitled Forever, was released in 2018.

Popcaan's international singles include "Only Man She Want", "Everything Nice", "Ova Dweet", "El Chapo", and "Family". He has collaborated with a number of international artists, most notably Drake, Jamie xx, Pusha T, Giggs, Matoma, Wale, Gorillaz, and Davido. Popcaan made his acting debut in the film The Intent 2: The Come Up (2018).

== Early life ==
Sutherland was born in Saint Thomas Parish, Jamaica, and grew up in Portmore. He was raised in a housing scheme, or housing project, known as Gangsta City. He describes his childhood as "rough", having to stop attending school due to the street drama surrounding his town. His stage name "Popcaan" was bestowed on him by his close friend Scumpy, who died to street violence in Portmore.

== Career ==
=== 2007–2010: Early career ===
In 2007, Popcaan approached Vybz Kartel at a local jam called "My Scheme" where Kartel recruited him to his Portmore Empire music group, becoming both a producer and mentor. Besides showing Popcaan the ropes of the music game, Kartel took him on major shows like Sting and Reggae Sumfest.

Popcaan began making music for Adidjaheim Productions with then-in-house producer NotNice, the first person to voice him professionally. He got off to a start with "Gal Wine" on the Gal Farm riddim, following up with early hits including "It Nuh Work So", "Jah Jah Protect Me", "Gangsta City", "Dream", "Gangsta City Part Second", and "Hot Grabba".

=== 2010–2013: Growing popularity ===
Popcaan's breakthrough came in 2010 with "Clarks", a collaboration with Vybz Kartel. The success of the song caused a nationwide spike in sales of the British shoe. In 2011, Popcaan received the Excellence in Music and Entertainment (EME) Award for Best New Artist — Male and Collaboration of the Year for "Clarks", which also won Song of the Year — Dancehall.

At the end of January 2012, Popcaan released a new mixtape, Yiy Change, the follow-up to his 2010 mixtape Hot Skull, Fry Yiy, Boil Brainz. In March, "Only Man She Want" gave Popcaan his first Billboard entry at No. 89 on the Hot R&B/Hip-Hop Songs chart. The song was later remixed by rapper Busta Rhymes.

Popcaan was also featured in The New York Times speaking on the growing impact of "Only Man She Want".

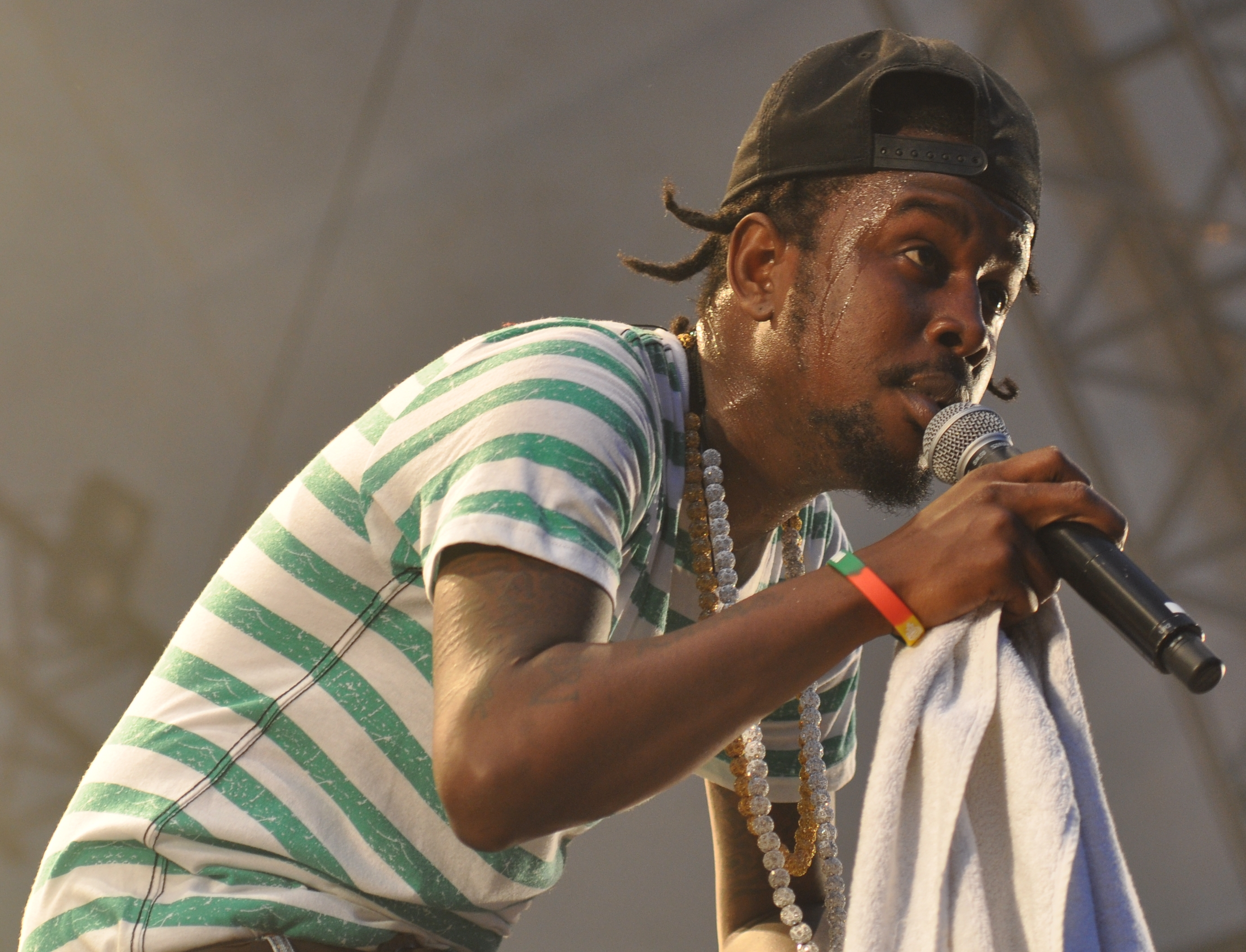
Popcaan performing in 2013

At the Youth View Awards, Popcaan won three awards: Favourite Summer Song and Local Chart-Topping Song of the Year for "Ravin", and Young, Hot and Hype Male of the Year.

Popcaan has toured the world since, in Europe, Canada, and the Caribbean and South American region. While in Canada, Popcaan connected with Canadian rapper Drake, who has expressed his admiration. In 2013, Popcaan released the video for "Unruly Rave", which was shot in Toronto, Ontario, and directed by October's Very Own label head Niko.

In 2012, Popcaan was featured on Pusha T's song "Blocka". His voice was sampled by Kanye West on Yeezus in 2013.

=== 2014–present: Where We Come From, Forever and subsequent fame ===
In 2014, Popcaan signed to Mixpak Records for a multi-record deal. His debut studio album, Where We Come From, was released on Mixpak on 10 June 2014. The project was executive produced by Dre Skull. The first single from the album, "Everything Nice", was produced by Dubbel Dutch and released on 1 October 2013. It entered the Billboard Top Reggae Albums chart at number 2, and the video had over 5 million views on YouTube.

In June 2014, Popcaan first appeared on the cover of The Fader in its 92nd issue. He featured on Melissa Steel's single "Kisses for Breakfast", which was a top ten hit in the UK in August 2014.

In September 2014, he was nominated for a MOBO Award in the Best Reggae Act category, his fourth consecutive nomination. He won the MOBO Award in 2015 and 2016.

In May 2015, Popcaan was featured on Jamie xx's "I Know There's Gonna Be (Good Times)" with American rapper Young Thug.

In January 2016, Popcaan was featured on English electronic music duo AlunaGeorge's single "I'm in Control". On 29 March 2016, a song entitled "Controlla" by Drake was leaked, with Popcaan being featured on it. A version without Popcaan was later featured on Drake's fourth studio album Views.

On 28 April 2016, Popcaan released the single "Ova Dweet".

On 2 May 2016, Popcaan was reportedly held by police after a performance in Antigua involving an altercation with an officer on stage.

In June 2016, Popcaan made his first UK appearance alongside Mixpak for the annual Red Bull Culture Clash and won the clash over Wiz Khalifa, Taylor Gang, Eskimo Dance, and UKG Allstars.

In March 2017, Popcaan performed guest vocals for the Gorillaz track "Saturnz Barz" off of the album Humanz. The track reached number five on the Billboard Hot Rock Songs chart. He also spent time in Europe as the opening act on Drake's Boy Meets World Tour.

Popcaan announced his second album Forever on 11 May 2018. It was preceded by the singles "Body So Good", "Wine for Me", and "Firm and Strong". The album was released on 20 July and premiered on a live stream hosted by Boiler Room. Popcaan headlined Reggae Sumfest the following day. Forever entered the Billboard Reggae Albums chart at number 2.

On 23 December 2018, Drake announced that Popcaan would be signed to OVO Sound and Warner Records. Popcaan's third album Vanquish, released on 19 December 2019, was the first project produced with OVO Sound. Popcaan's fourth album, Fixtape, was released on 7 August 2020. It includes the Drake collaborations "All I Need" and "Twist & Turn" featuring PartyNextDoor. On 16 October 2020, Popcaan joined forces with OVO affiliate Preme for their EP Link Up, which featured Wiz Khalfia, Davido, Beam, and French Montana.

On 27 January 2023, Popcaan released his fifth album, Great Is He, on OVO Sound. It debuted on the Billboard Reggae Albums chart at number 3.

== Honors ==
In February 2026, Popcaan was traditionally honored in Ghana through an enstoolment process that saw him become a sub-chief in the Asebu in the Central Region. He was honored with the title "Nana Arkoh Kese I," which makes him Aboafohen of the Apagyahen Division.

== Discography ==
- Bay Badness (2012)
- Where We Come From (2014)
- Forever (2018)
- Fixtape (2020)
- Great Is He (2023)
- Nothing Without God (2025)

== Filmography ==
Year	Title	Role	Notes
2018	The Intent 2: The Come Up	Soursop	
