= Lily Allen =

English singer-songwriter and actress (born 1985)

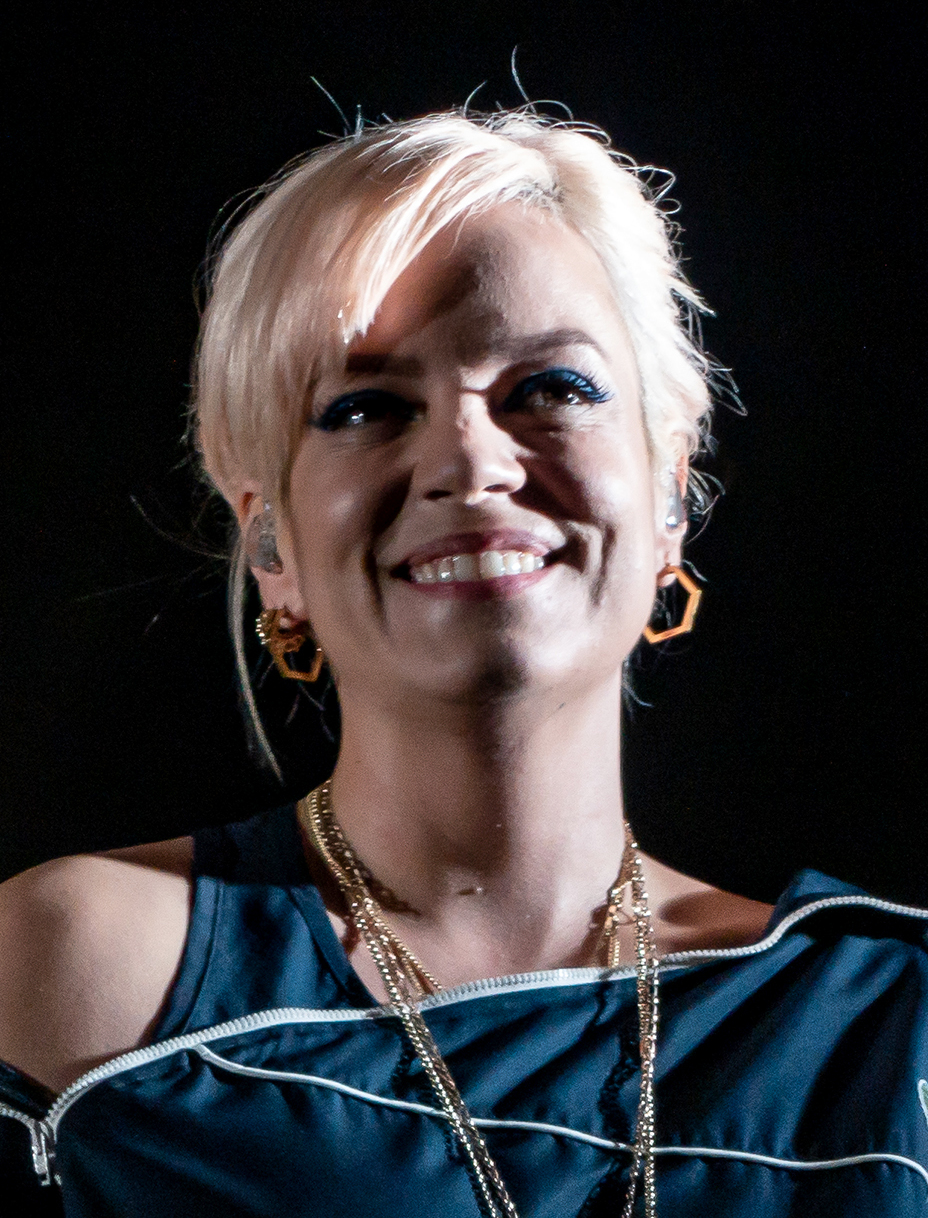
- Allen in 2018
- Born: Lily Rose Beatrice Allen; 2 May 1985 (age 41); Hammersmith, London, England
- Occupations: Singer; songwriter; actress
- Years active: 1988–present
- Spouses: Sam Cooper (m. 2011; div. 2018); David Harbour (m. 2020; sep. 2025)
- Children: 2
- Parents: Alison Owen; Keith Allen
- Relatives: Alfie Allen (brother); Kevin Allen (uncle); Sam Smith (third cousin)
- Awards: Full list
- Musical career
- Genres: R&B; pop; reggae
- Instrument: Vocals
- Years active: 2005–present
- Labels: London; Regal; Capitol; Warner Bros.; Parlophone; BMG
- Website: LilyAllenMusic.com

Lily Rose Beatrice Allen (born 2 May 1985) is an English singer-songwriter and actress. Her accolades include a Brit Award as well as nominations for a Grammy Award and a Laurence Olivier Award.

Allen's musical career began in 2005 when she was signed to Regal Recordings and began publishing her vocal recordings on the social networking site Myspace. Their popularity resulted in airplay on BBC Radio 1. Her 2006 debut commercial single, "Smile", reached number one on the UK Singles Chart by July of that year and received double Platinum certification by the British Phonographic Industry (BPI). Allen's debut studio album, Alright, Still (2006), was met with positive critical reception, peaked at number two on the UK Albums Chart and sold over 2.6 million copies worldwide. The album also yielded a Grammy Award nomination for Best Alternative Music Album and spawned the follow-up singles "LDN" and "Alfie".

Her second studio album, It's Not Me, It's You (2009), debuted atop the UK Albums Chart and the Australian ARIA Charts and spawned the singles "The Fear", "Not Fair" and "Fuck You". This success saw her receive the Brit Award for British Female Solo Artist at the 2010 Brit Awards. Allen and Amy Winehouse were credited with starting a process that led to the "year of the women" media label in 2009 that saw five female artists making music of "experimentalism and fearlessness" nominated for the Mercury Prize. Her third album, Sheezus (2014), reached the top of the UK Albums Chart once more, while her fourth album, No Shame (2018), peaked at number eight. Her fifth and most recent album, West End Girl (2025), reached number two and was met with broad critical acclaim.

Allen also ventured into other careers: in 2008, she hosted her own television talk show, Lily Allen and Friends, on BBC Three before launching her own record label, In the Name Of, in 2011. In 2018, Allen released her autobiographical book, My Thoughts Exactly. Her personal life, including an affair with Liam Gallagher and hiring female prostitutes, attracted media attention. As an actress, Allen appeared in the 2019 film How to Build a Girl. In 2021, she made her West End debut in the new play 2:22 A Ghost Story, for which she received a Laurence Olivier Award nomination for Best Actress. She is a daughter of actor Keith Allen and film producer Alison Owen.

== Early life ==
Allen was born on 2 May 1985 in Hammersmith, west London, to Keith Allen, a Welsh-born actor, and English film producer Alison Owen. She has an elder sister, Sarah; a younger brother, actor Alfie (subject of her song "Alfie"); and a younger sister, Rebecca. Alison Owen was from a devoutly Catholic working-class Portsmouth family, and was 17 when she gave birth to Sarah. Allen is the goddaughter of director Daniel Kleinman and Wild Colonials vocalist Angela McCluskey and a third cousin of singer Sam Smith.

At the age of three, Allen appeared in The Comic Strip Presents... episode "The Yob", which her father had co-written. When she was four, her father left the family. During her early childhood, Allen lived with her family on a council estate. They later settled in Islington. For that time, the family lived with comedian Harry Enfield whilst her mother dated him. The Clash singer and guitarist Joe Strummer was close to Allen.

Allen attended 13 schools, including King Charles III's junior alma mater Hill House School and Bedales School, and was expelled from several of them for drinking and smoking. When Allen was eleven, former University of Victoria music student Rachel Santesso overheard her singing "Wonderwall" by Oasis in the school's playground; impressed, Santesso, who later became an award-winning soprano and composer, called Allen into her office the next day and started giving her lunchtime singing lessons. This led to Allen singing "Baby Mine" from Disney's Dumbo at a school concert.

Allen told Loveline that the audience was "brought to tears at the sight of a troubled young girl doing something good". At that point Allen said she knew that music was something she needed to do either as a lifelong vocation or to get it out of her system. She played the piano to grade 5 standard and achieved grade 8 in singing. Allen also played violin, guitar and trumpet, and was a member of a chamber choir. Her first solo was "In the Bleak Midwinter". In 1998, Allen appeared in the music video to the Fat Les song "Vindaloo". She dropped out of school aged fifteen, not wanting to "spend a third of her life preparing to work for the next third of her life, to set herself up with a pension for the next third of her life."

== Music career ==
=== 2001–2005: Career beginnings ===
Smile - Lily Allen (debut single)

When her family went to Ibiza on holiday, Allen told her mother that she was staying with friends but remained in Sant Antoni de Portmany instead. She earned money by working at a Plastic Fantastic record store and dealing ecstasy at the age of 15. Allen met her first manager, George Lamb, in Ibiza. She first recorded the vocals for "On Me Head Not Off Me Head" written by her father for Mike Bassett: England Manager in 2001, and was featured in the 2002 song by her father's group Fat Les, "Who Invented Fish and Chips". She started to work with music producers, and recorded a demo. She was rejected by several labels, which she attributed to her drinking and being the daughter of Keith Allen. She eventually used her father's connections to get signed to London Records in 2002. When the executive who had signed her left, the label lost interest and she left without releasing the folk songs, many of which were written by her father. She then studied horticulture to become a florist, but changed her mind and returned to music. Allen began writing songs, while her manager introduced her to production duo Future Cut in 2004. They worked in a small studio in the basement of an office building.

In 2005, Allen was signed to Regal Recordings; they gave her £25,000 to produce an album, though they were unable to provide much support for it due to their preoccupation with other releases such as X&Y (Coldplay) and Demon Days (Gorillaz). Allen then created an account on Myspace and began posting demos that she recorded in November 2005. The demos attracted thousands of listeners, and 500 limited edition 7-inch vinyl singles of "LDN" were rush-released, reselling for as much as £40. Allen also produced two mixtapes – My First Mixtape and My Second Mixtape – to promote her work. As she accumulated tens of thousands of Myspace friends, The Observer Music Monthly (OMM), a magazine published in The Observer, took interest in March 2006. Few people outside of her label's A&R department knew who she was, so the label was slow in responding to publications wanting to report about her. She received her first major mainstream coverage, appearing in the magazine's cover story two months later.

=== 2006–2008: Alright, Still ===
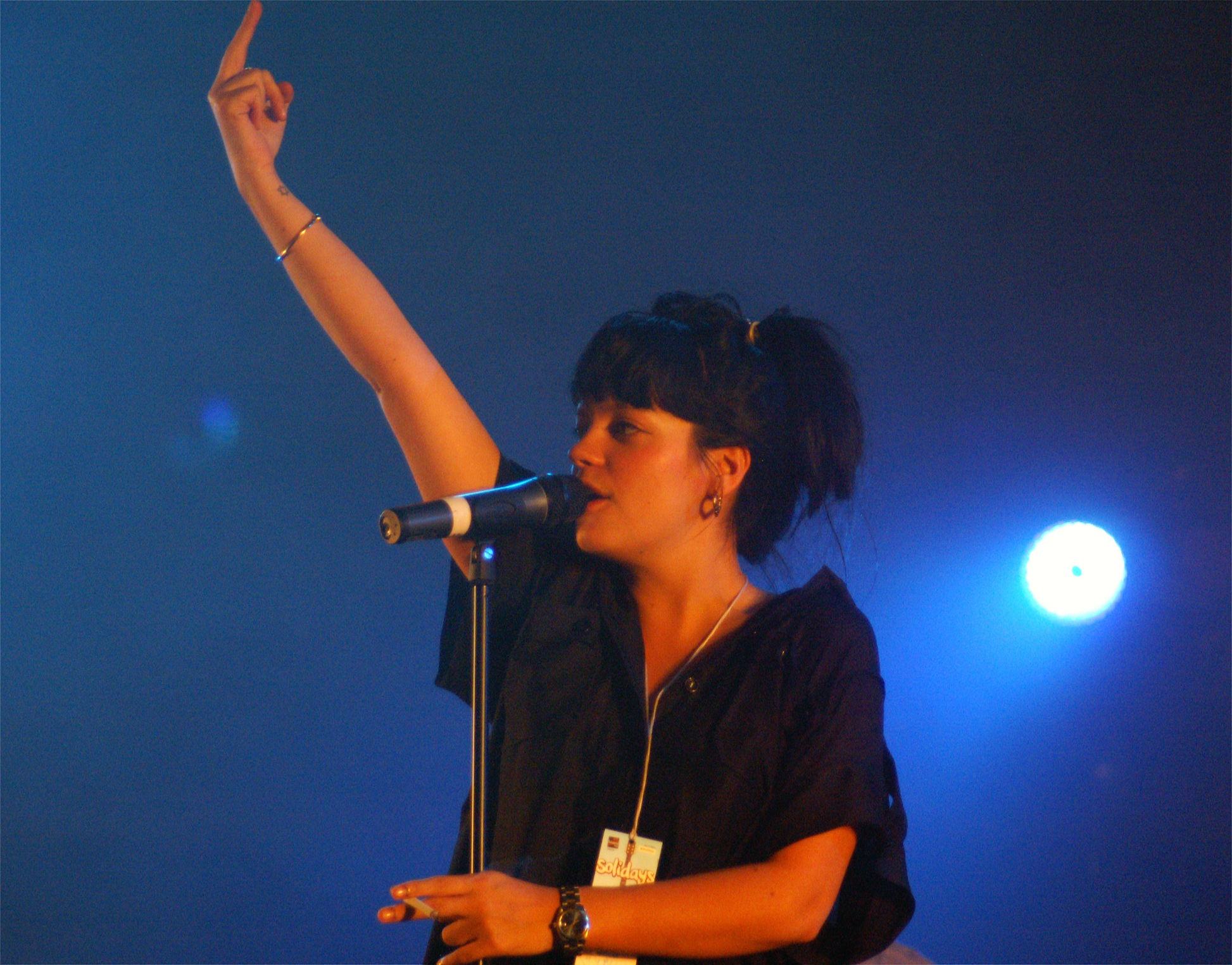
Allen performing in 2007

The success convinced her label to allow her more creative control over the album and to use some of the songs that she had written instead of working with mainstream producers. Allen decided to work with producers Greg Kurstin and Mark Ronson, finishing the rest of the album in two weeks. Allen's debut album, Alright, Still, was released in July 2006. Most of the tracks had been previewed on her Myspace page, including the singles "Smile", "LDN", "Knock 'Em Out", and "Alfie".

In September 2006, "Smile" was made available on the US version of iTunes Store. By December 2006, her music video for Smile had been played on various music channels as well as the song getting a little airplay. US-based Entertainment Weekly named Alright, Still as one of the top 10 albums of 2006 despite the fact that it had not yet been released in the US. Allen also did several promotional ads for MTV as their Discover and Download artist of the month for January 2007. The album was released in the US on 30 January 2007, landing at 20 on the Billboard 200. By January 2009, the album had sold 960,000 copies in the UK and 520,000 copies in the US.

In 2007, she played the newly launched Park Stage at the Glastonbury Festival, replacing MIA who had cancelled. During the festival she reunited two members of The Specials, an act that guitarist Lynval Golding claimed played a "massive part" in the group's 2009 reunion. She also sang the vocals on the top ten single, "Oh My God", a cover of the Kaiser Chiefs song by Mark Ronson. On 1 July 2007, Allen appeared at the Concert for Diana held at Wembley Stadium, London, to celebrate the life of Princess Diana. She sang "LDN" and "Smile". Allen's single "Littlest Things" from her album produced by Ronson helped earn him a "Producer of the Year – Non Classical" 2008 Grammy Award. She also provided background vocals for a couple of songs on the Kaiser Chiefs' third album in 2008, co-produced by Ronson. Allen won a 2008 BMI songwriting award for "Smile".

In October 2007, Allen contributed a cover of the Pretenders' "Don't Get Me Wrong" for the covers compilation album Radio 1: Established 1967, in celebration of the fortieth anniversary of BBC Radio 1 signing on air. Allen later performed at a benefit concert for War Child, an international child protection agency that works with children affected by war. Backed by Keane, Allen sang "Smile" and "Everybody's Changing".

=== 2008–2011: It's Not Me, It's You and musical hiatus ===
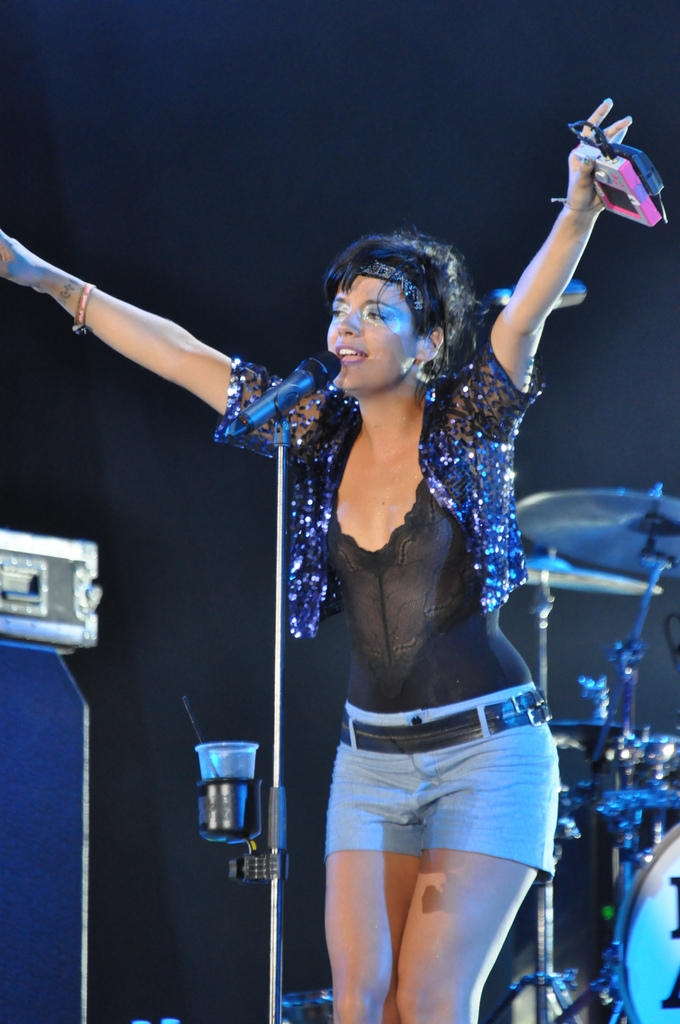
Allen performing at the Sziget Festival in August 2009

22 - Lily Allen (2009)

After the release of her first album, her parent record company, EMI, was taken over by Terra Firma. She also changed her management company from Empire Artist Management to Twenty-First Artists, although her core team remained in place. At the urging of her record company, Allen tried unsuccessfully to create the album with several writers and producers. Allen eventually returned to Greg Kurstin who had written three songs for Alright, Still. The album was produced by Kurstin at Eagle Rock Studios in Los Angeles. Before returning to Kus, Allen co-wrote the songs for the album with Kurstin who played piano on it. This is a change from her earlier work in which she wrote lyrics for finished tracks. Allen released a statement saying "We decided to try and make bigger sounding, more ethereal songs, real songs ... I wanted to work with one person from start to finish to make it one body of work. I wanted it to feel like it had some sort of integrity. I think I've grown up a bit as a person and I hope it reflects that." She posted two new song demos on her Myspace page and planned to release a mixtape to give her fans an idea of what the new direction was.

Allen cancelled a scheduled appearance at the 2008 Isle of Wight Festival, telling festival promoter John Giddings the reason for the cancellation was that her album was behind schedule. Giddings said that the reason given was not acceptable and possibly a lie. Giddings decided not to sue her. Photos of her drunk and topless in the Cannes Film Festival were also widely covered in the press. Her appearance at the 2008 Glamour Awards also generated criticism, as she showed up intoxicated wearing a dress covered in decapitated Bambi figures, and had an on-stage, expletive-laced exchange with Elton John. On 29 June 2008, Allen performed at the Glastonbury Festival alongside producer Mark Ronson. An emotional Allen dedicated her performance of "Littlest Things" to her grandmother who died the night before. It's Not Me, It's You was first scheduled for an early 2008 release, but her miscarriage and creative issues delayed the release date to the autumn. In autumn 2008, EMI underwent a restructuring. Due to this environment, a decision was made to move the album's eventual release date. An online game, Escape the Fear, was created by Matmi as part of the viral marketing campaign targeted at people unaware of Allen or the album. Since its release, "The Game" has topped the worldwide viral charts three times, including the week of Christmas—a highly contested time of the year. By 18 February 2009, "The Game" had been played over two million times. The singer and the Clash guitarist Mick Jones performed the Clash's song "Straight to Hell" on an album for the charity Heroes.

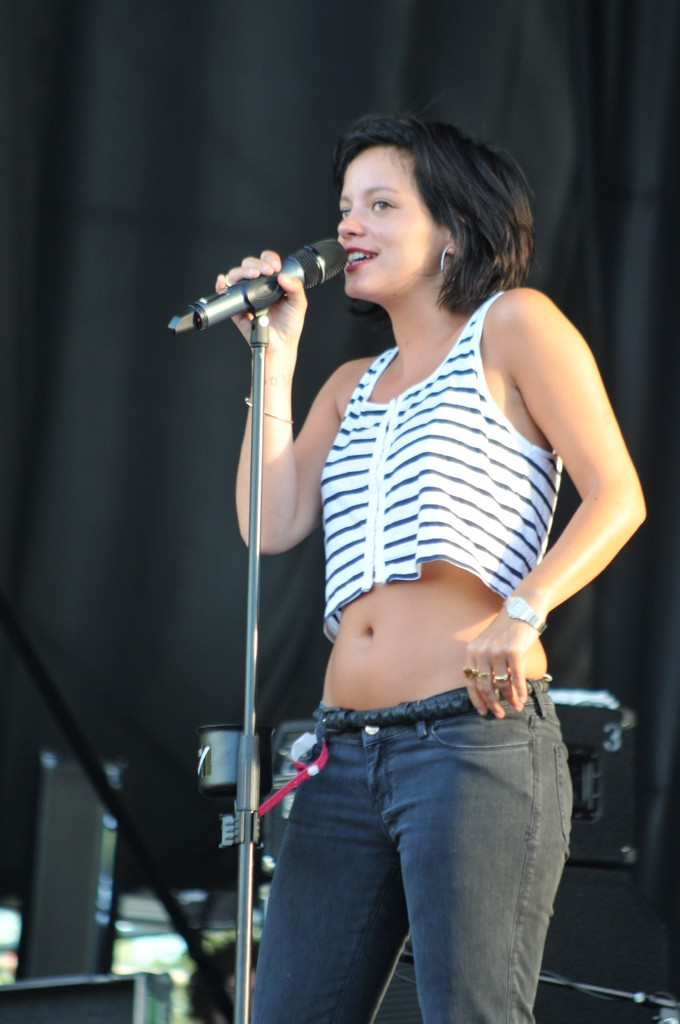
Allen performing at the INmusic festival in Zagreb, Croatia, 24 June 2009

It's Not Me, It's You was released in February 2009. It debuted at the number 1 position in the UK, Canada, and Australia and the number 5 position in the United States. The album has been certified platinum in the United Kingdom. The release of the album was a factor in EMI more than trebling their earnings. The first single from the album, "The Fear", was number 1 for the first four weeks in the UK after its release. The second single released from the album, "Not Fair", reached the number 9 position. She began her It's Not Me, It's You World Tour in March, touring throughout the next two years until September 2010. Her work on this album with Greg Kurstin earned her the Songwriters of the Year at the 2010 Ivor Novello Awards. In addition, she won with Kurstin Best Song Musically and Lyrically and Most Performed Work for "The Fear". Allen appeared overwhelmed by this recognition from what she considered "real awards". In October 2010, Allen won her second BMI Pop Song Award by the United States music licensing organisation Broadcast Music Incorporated for extensive United States radio airplay of her song, "The Fear".

Allen and Jamie Hince, guitarist for The Kills, raised £48,350 for the children's charity The Hoping Foundation. The pair sang "Dream a Little Dream of Me" at a karaoke auction fundraiser.

In September 2009, Allen announced that she was considering a career in acting, that she would not renew her record contract, and that she had "no plans" to make another record. In September 2010, she gave her last performance for two and a half years, supporting Muse at Wembley Stadium in London, England. She featured on the UK top five single, "Just Be Good to Green" by Professor Green in June 2010. The following month, she started writing songs for the musical version of Bridget Jones's Diary which was scheduled to open in London's West End in 2012. Also in 2011, T-Pain used a verse from Allen's "Who'd Have Known" as the chorus to the song "5 O'Clock", which became the second single from his album Revolver. The song, which also features Wiz Khalifa, was released in September 2011, and reached number ten on the Billboard Hot 100 chart, making it Allen's first Top 10 single in the United States.

=== 2012–2018: Sheezus and No Shame ===
In June 2012, Allen confirmed she was in the studio working with Greg Kurstin on new music. She later changed her professional name from Lily Allen to Lily Rose Cooper and appeared on the track "True Love" on Pink's sixth studio album, The Truth About Love, released in September 2012. In February 2013, she performed live at a Paris fashion show produced by Mark Ronson in what she called her "mumback", and foreshadowed the release of a new album "inspired by her experiences of motherhood" by the end of 2013. In August 2013, she changed her professional name back to Lily Allen and tweeted new music would be arriving "soon".

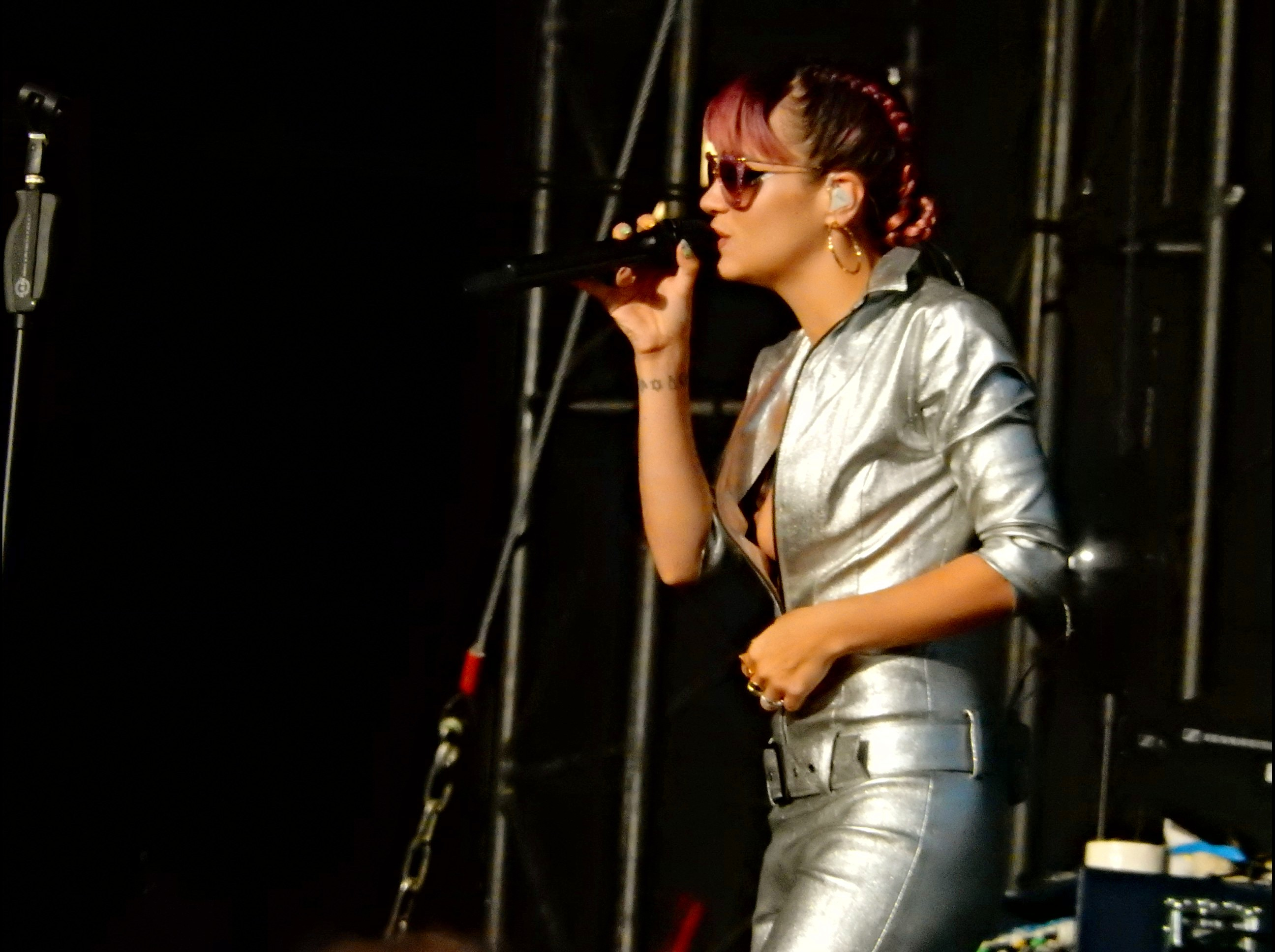
Allen performing in 2014

In November 2013, Allen recorded a cover of Keane's "Somewhere Only We Know" for the John Lewis Christmas advert with a portion of the song's sales earnings donated to Save the Children's Philippine Typhoon Appeal campaign. Released as a download single, it reached number one in the UK singles chart on 24 November. On 12 November 2013, Allen premiered the video for her new song "Hard Out Here" on her official website. The song was released as a download the following week and entered the UK singles chart at number nine, giving Allen two simultaneous top ten hit singles. Allen's November 2013 video for "Hard out Here" was accused of being racist for its use of mostly black dancers in an allegedly "disapproving" manner. Allen responded that ethnicity was not a factor in hiring the dancers, and the video was a lighthearted satirical look at objectification of women in modern pop music. In November 2016, Allen apologised for the video in an interview with Annie Mac, stating "I definitely wanted to make a feminist statement. But I was guilty of assuming that there was a one-size-fits-all where feminism is concerned." In December 2013, Allen was announced as one of the newest signees at Warner Bros. Records due to Warner Music Group acquiring Parlophone from Universal Music Group in May 2013. On 13 January 2014, the song "Air Balloon" was premiered on BBC Radio 1 and was released on 2 March 2014, as the second single from Allen's third studio album Sheezus. The album was released on 5 May 2014. Allen performed at the Glastonbury Festival 2014.

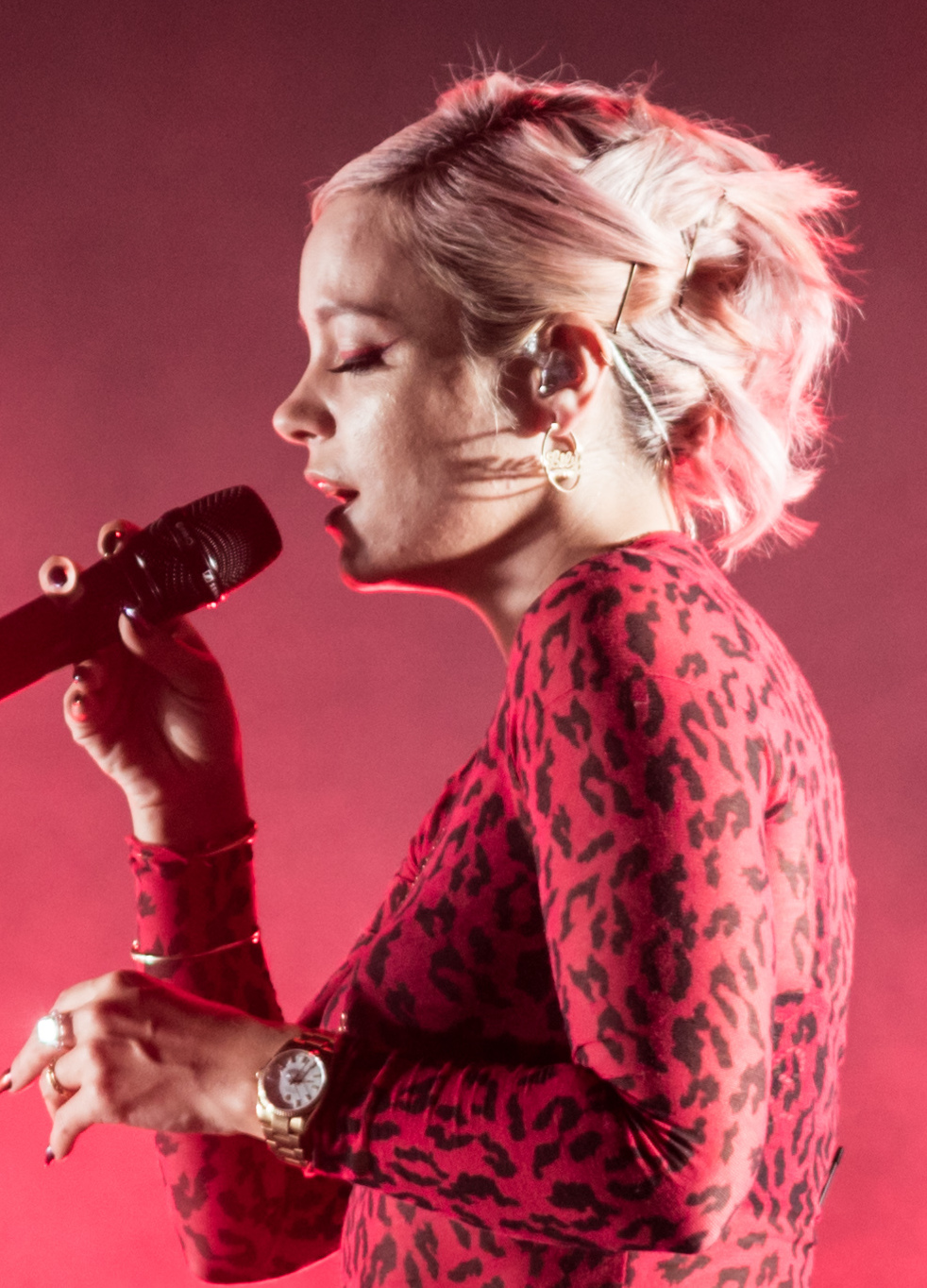
Allen performing in March 2018

Following the release of Sheezus (2014), Allen had an "identity crisis". She did not enjoy the music she was being asked to create and believed people within the music industry were controlling her musical choices. Allen mentioned on the podcast News Roast that she is working on a new album, which will mainly deal with herself, her relationship with her children, the breakdown of her marriage, substance abuse, etc. Allen has been working with Mark Ronson. In late 2017, Allen uploaded numerous songs online in preparation for the album, including the track titled "Family Man". When conceiving the album Allen wanted to work through her problems via music. Allen decided to do this because she felt that people are often led "by outside forces" when they are trying to express themselves – something she wanted to explore when creating No Shame.

Later that year, in December, a song called "Trigger Bang" featuring rapper Giggs was leaked. On 24 January 2018 Allen announced her new album would be called No Shame. The album was released 8 June 2018. No Shame was nominated for a Mercury Prize, with the album being one of 12 to be shortlisted for the award. An electropop album, No Shame takes influence from dancehall and reggae, and features confessional lyrics that discuss the breakdown of Allen's marriage and friendships, maternal guilt, substance abuse, along with social and political issues. Upon release No Shame was met with generally positive reviews from music critics, who praised the album's mature lyrical content and themes, Allen's artistic evolution, the composition and production. The album peaked at number eight on the UK Albums Chart, it reached the top 40 on the New Zealand and Irish charts and became Allen's fourth consecutive top 10 album in Australia. To promote the album, Allen embarked on her worldwide No Shame Tour.

=== 2019–present: West End acting debut and West End Girl ===
In April 2019, Allen revealed on Beats 1 radio that she was working on her next record which would be a concept album. Allen later said in March 2020 that her new album only features "odd mentions" of her past addictions. She said: "This album I've been doing, I've been writing for just over a year, but I feel like I've moved on mentally so far from that time."

In the Glastonbury Festival 2022, Allen appeared during Olivia Rodrigo's set to perform "Fuck You", as a protest against the 2022 Supreme Court ruling that abortion was not protected by the Constitution of the United States. The Guardian described it as a "thrilling, furious" moment. Allen later said that she was unsure that she could perform "on a stage like that sober again", being nearly three years sober.

In late 2022, Allen booked five weeks in a music studio, but she said it felt "contrived" and that the music was not ready to be released. In 2024, she said she had recorded around 50 songs for her next music project, which she was still working on. On 20 October 2025, she announced that her fifth studio album West End Girl would be released four days later. Her first album in seven years, and her first since her departure from Parlophone Records, received widespread critical acclaim from music critics. The album contained personal and honest lyrics, discussing her ex-husband David Harbour's infidelity and alleged sex-addiction. The album peaked at number two on the UK albums chart, and in the top-10 in New Zealand, Australia and Ireland. The album's lead single "Madeline" reached the top 20 on the UK Singles Chart, while the album track "Pussy Palace" peaked at number 8, marking her first top-10 UK single in over a decade.

On 13 February 2026, Allen announced that all her albums, including 'Alright, Still', which has never been released on vinyl, will all be released on vinyl.

== Influences and musical style ==
"LDN"
The first song released as a single, featuring ska influence and a sample of "Reggae Merengue" (2005)

"Smile"
A 30-second sample of Allen's "Smile", in which the chorus is played (2006)

Allen's early released songs saw her singing against retro productions. Her songs also featured other elements, such as the ska influence on second single, "LDN". She was also noted for her liberal use of crude words in her lyrics. Allen has said she cringes now when listening to tracks from Alright, Still, as it reminds her that she was a "sort of over-excitable teenager who desperately wanted attention" when she wrote it. Wanting to move on from the retro sound that many other artists had adapted since her debut, Allen ventured in a new direction sonically and lyrically in her second studio album, It's Not Me, It's You. "The Fear", the first single from the album, is an electro-pop track denouncing consumerism. Her new musical direction and willingness to write lyrics that tackled less-common subjects were lauded by some critics.

Allen's song "Who'd Have Known" was sampled in T-Pain's single "5 O'Clock" because of her accent. Joe Strummer, a close friend of Allen's father Keith, played mixtapes of Brazilian music and Jamaican reggae and ska when she was young. Allen stated that she had "always been into very black music" such as ska, reggae, and hip hop music. Since she did not know how to rap, she chose to use reggae as a point of reference when making Alright, Still. The album's music blends ska and reggae with pop melodies. Allen's melodies are influenced by the jazz improvisation techniques of American singers Blossom Dearie and Ella Fitzgerald. The album's beats are influenced by various genres such as jazz and grime. Singers Lady Gaga, Tegan and Sara, Bridgit Mendler, Jullie, Olivia Rodrigo, Victoria Justice, PinkPantheress, and Charli XCX have each been influenced by Allen.

== Acting career ==
=== Stage ===
In June 2021, Allen announced that she would be playing the lead role of Jenny in the West End play 2:22 A Ghost Story at the Noël Coward Theatre from 3 August 2021. The play, directed by Matthew Dunster and written by Danny Robins saw Allen debut in August 2021. Reviewing the play for The Independent, Annabel Nugent wrote, "Allen is superb as Jenny. Exhaustion thrums a fraction below her palpable fear – just visible enough in her performance to have you questioning Jenny's version of events". In 2022, she received a Laurence Olivier Award nomination for Best Actress, and also won a WhatsOnStage Award for her performance.

In 2023, Allen starred as Katurian in a revival of Martin McDonagh's play The Pillowman at the Duke of York's Theatre, London opposite Steve Pemberton, Paul Kaye and Matthew Tennyson. It was directed by Matthew Dunster who also directed 2:22 A Ghost Story. In July and August 2025, Allen starred as Hedda Gabler in Hedda, a new re-imagining of Henrik Ibsen's play adapted and directed by Matthew Dunster for the Ustinov Studio, Bath, Somerset.

=== Screen ===
Allen made an appearance as a lady-in-waiting in the 1998 film Elizabeth, which was co-produced by her mother. She later appeared as Elizabeth Taylor in How to Build a Girl in July 2019, alongside her brother Alfie. In April 2023, Allen starred alongside Freema Agyeman in Sharon Horgan's comedy-drama Dreamland for Sky Max. It was developed from a short starring Morgana Robinson that aired in 2017.

== Other ventures ==
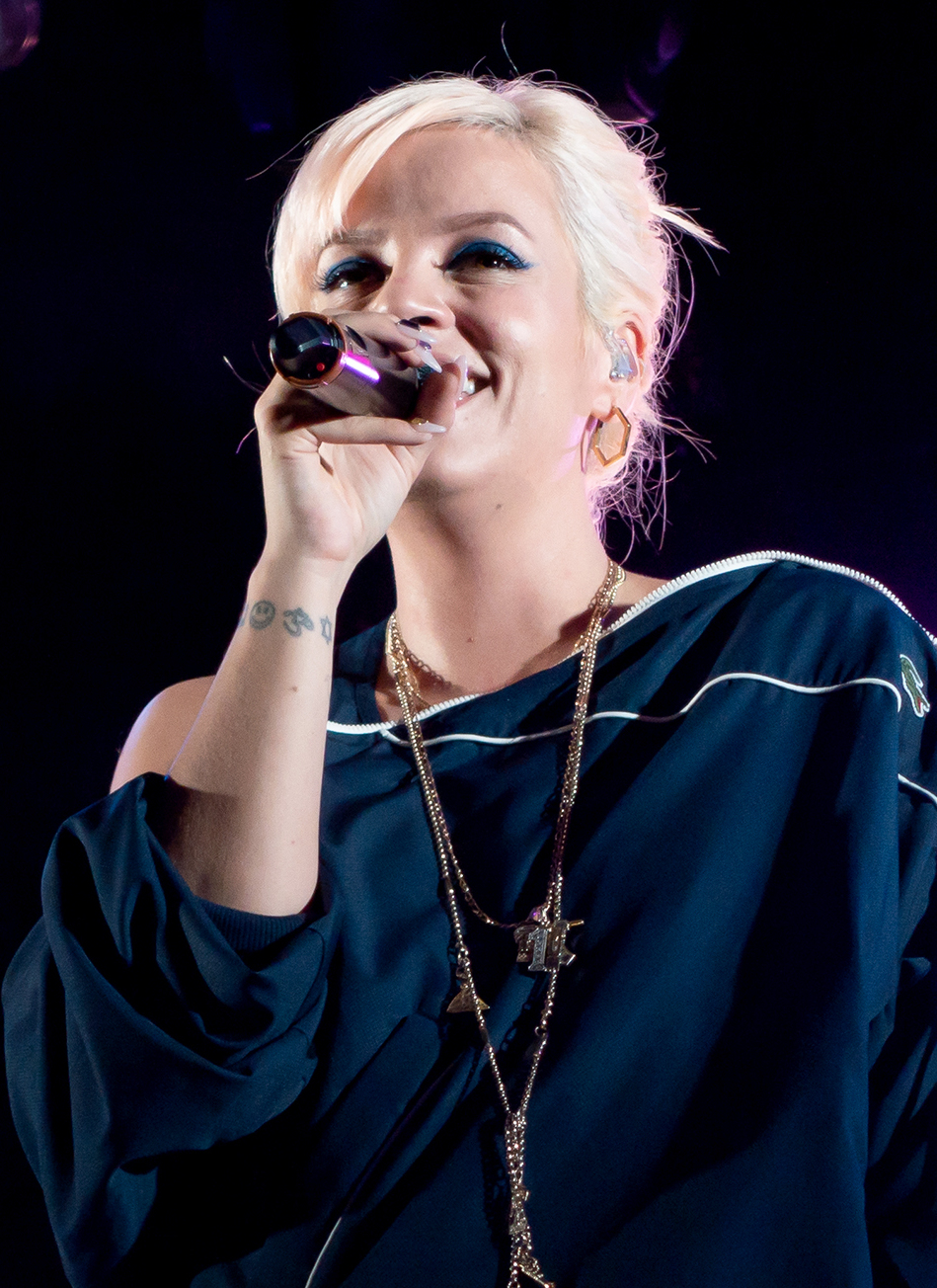
Allen at the El Rey Theatre in Los Angeles, in 2018

Allen signed a one-series contract to present her own BBC Three TV show titled Lily Allen and Friends based on the social networking phenomenon that helped to launch her music career. Guests included Mark Ronson, Joanna Page, James Corden, Lauren Laverne, Róisín Murphy, Louis Walsh, and Danny Dyer. The show attracted only 2 per cent of the total multi-channel audience despite a high-profile nationwide marketing campaign. Citing Allen's rapid development as a TV host and her popularity among its target audience BBC Three announced it was renewing Lily Allen and Friends for a second season. BBC Three controller Danny Cohen later said that the show would not air in the spring of 2009 as originally scheduled because of music commitments.

In 2009, Allen was named the face of the National Portrait Gallery as part of the gallery's marketing campaign. The picture was photographed by Nadav Kander emblazoned with the words, "vocalist, lyricist, florist". Karl Lagerfeld, the head designer for Chanel, personally hired and photographed Allen for a campaign to promote a luxury line of handbags due to launch in September 2009. Allen and her sister opened their own clothing store, titled "Lucy in Disguise", on 15 September 2010. Allen did not entirely abandon music during this period, in which she focused on starting her family. In January 2011, she launched her own record label, In the Name Of, with financial backing from Sony Music. The label released the debut album of Tom Odell, but closed in 2014. In May 2016, Allen announced the launch of her second record label, Bank Holiday Records. British-American R&B singer Celeste was one of the first artists to sign to the label.

On 20 September 2018, Allen published the memoir My Thoughts Exactly with Blink Publishing. It was nominated for the FutureBook Campaign of the Year. The book is one of seven chosen by the Evening Standard as the "best celebrity memoirs of 2018". It is one of nine books listed under the "Showbusiness" category of The Guardian's best books of 2018.

In October 2020, Allen worked with the sex tech company Womanizer to create her own sex toy, Liberty, a clitoral pump. She is the chief liberation officer at Womanizer and is leading their #IMasturbate campaign which encourages women to embrace their sexuality. Allen had previously recommended Womanizer's products in her autobiography My Thoughts Exactly.

In 2024, Allen began hosting a twice-weekly BBC Sounds podcast, Miss Me?, with her friend Miquita Oliver. That year, she opened an OnlyFans account to sell pictures and videos of her feet. Allen had discovered that photos of her feet were popular on WikiFeet, a foot fetish website, and her nail technician suggested she could make money selling photos. Allen said that, as of 2024, she earned more from OnlyFans than she did from her approximately eight million listeners on Spotify.

== Accolades ==
Allen has received 31 awards and 73 nominations for her music, including nominations for nine BRIT Awards (one won), one Grammy Award, three Ivor Novello Awards (three won), one Mercury Prize and twelve NME Awards (three won). For her acting, she has been nominated for a Laurence Olivier Award.

== Personal life ==
In November 2010, she took legal action against Associated Newspapers, the parent company of the Daily Mail, after the newspaper published photographs of her home. Allen accused them of invasion of privacy and copyright infringement. Allen is a cricket fan and has appeared on Test Match Special.

=== Relationships and children ===
Allen began dating musician Ed Simons of the Chemical Brothers in September 2007, and in December, Allen announced that they were expecting a child. Allen announced that she suffered a miscarriage in January 2008. However, in her 2018 memoir My Thoughts Exactly, Allen writes that she had had an abortion, but "fake[d]" the miscarriage due to fears over how tabloids would report the story. After five months of dating, Allen's relationship with Simons ended. Allen has stated that she spent three weeks in a psychiatric clinic due to depression.

In July 2009, Allen began dating Sam Cooper, a builder and decorator. On 5 August 2010, Allen announced that she was pregnant with her and Cooper's first child, later confirmed to be a boy, due early in 2011. She experienced complications early in the pregnancy, including "about a week and a half of really heavy bleeding". In late October, six months into her pregnancy, Allen contracted a viral infection, which caused her to suffer a stillbirth, announced on 1 November. On 6 November, Allen was admitted to a hospital, where she responded well to treatment for septicaemia. In February 2017, Allen said that she was diagnosed with post-traumatic stress disorder after the stillbirth.

Allen and Cooper became engaged in December 2010 while on holiday in Bali. They wed on 11 June 2011 at St. James Church in Cranham, Gloucestershire, England. The designer of Allen's wedding dress confirmed she was several months pregnant on the wedding day. Allen gave birth to her daughter, Ethel Mary, in 2011. She gave birth to her second daughter, Marnie Rose, in 2013, following which she experienced postnatal depression.

On 2 September 2018, Allen posted on Instagram that she had paid for sex with female escorts in 2014 whilst married to Cooper, and whilst on tour promoting Sheezus. Allen had included details of these events in her book My Thoughts Exactly, and said that she made the Instagram post as the Daily Mail were planning to publish an article about it the following day. Allen said that "I'm not proud, but I'm not ashamed" and linked the events to her postnatal depression and the breakdown of her marriage. She has criticised the press for portraying the events as a "lesbian prostitute sex romp". Speaking on The Jonathan Ross Show, Allen said she did not regard the sex as "cheating" on her then-husband Sam Cooper as the prostitutes were women.

In My Thoughts Exactly, Allen wrote that she had an affair with Liam Gallagher when he was married to Nicole Appleton. In mid-2015, Allen and Cooper broke up, after she told him about her acts of infidelity. In June 2018, it was publicly announced that a "friendly divorce" from Cooper had been finalised and they would share custody of their children. Allen said in 2025 that she has had about four or five abortions.

Allen began a relationship with the American actor David Harbour in 2019. They made their red carpet debut during the 26th Screen Actors Guild Awards in January 2020. On 7 September 2020, a day after obtaining their marriage license, they married in Las Vegas in a wedding officiated by an Elvis impersonator. The couple shared a home in Brooklyn. Allen said in 2024 that she had prioritised her children over her career as a contrast to the relative absence of her parents. In December 2024, The Daily Telegraph reported that Allen and Harbour had separated, after Allen's profile was seen on the exclusive dating app Raya, while other reports state the couple had officially separated in early 2025. Following the release of her studio album West End Girl in October 2025, Allen stated that the album was partially based on the "demise" of her relationship with Harbour.

=== Mental health ===
Allen has been outspoken regarding her body image throughout her career. In an interview for Lorraine, an ITV breakfast programme, Allen mentions that she "used to sleep for days so that [she] didn't eat" and that her relationship with her body was "not great" in her 20s. When asked about being influenced by the pressure of the music industry to "look a certain way in order to sell records", she replied that due to her defiant way of dealing with these unrealistic expectations, she was often criticised far more than the average musician. In January 2021, Allen gave an interview to discuss how she became addicted to the prescription drug Adderall in 2014 to lose weight before supporting Miley Cyrus on her Bangerz tour. In February 2017, Allen said that she had been diagnosed with bipolar disorder. In 2023, she was diagnosed with attention deficit hyperactivity disorder (ADHD).

=== Politics and activism ===
Allen considers herself a socialist. Although she is a staunch supporter of the Labour Party, she was credited with helping inspire a parliamentary rebellion against former Prime Minister Gordon Brown when she wrote to all members of parliament asking them to back an amendment to an energy bill, requiring a reward scheme for home production of renewable energy. She later confirmed her support for the Labour Party and then-Prime Minister Gordon Brown in particular.

After the British government's plans to implement a three-strikes policy for file sharing copyright infringement, Allen came out in support for disconnecting repeat offenders. Creating a blog titled "It's Not Alright" against file sharing, it subsequently came to light that she had copied text directly from the Techdirt website of an interview with 50 Cent, without attribution. This led to accusations that Allen had infringed on other artists' copyrights by creating mix tapes early in her career, that she then made available via her website. A group of supporters of filesharing, operating under the name "Anonymous", launched a denial of service attack dubbed Operation Payback that shut down Allen's website and targeted other critics.

On 1 October 2009, Allen and several other musicians released the world's first digital musical petition aimed at pressuring world leaders attending the December 2009 climate change summit in Copenhagen. The petition included a cover of the song "Beds Are Burning" by Midnight Oil.

During the London assembly and mayoral elections in April 2016, Allen stated that she would be giving "half her vote to the Women's Equality Party" – by voting for them on the London-wide Assembly list but voting Labour elsewhere. In June 2016, Allen published several tweets and attended protests in support of Labour Party leader Jeremy Corbyn, after mass resignations from his shadow cabinet and a leadership challenge. On 15 June 2017, Allen appeared on Channel 4 News to discuss the Grenfell Tower fire. She claimed that "the death count has been downplayed by the mainstream media", disputing the then official figure of 17 fatalities by saying, "I'm hearing from people that the figure is much closer to 150". The official death toll is now 72. In November 2019, Allen declared during the 2019 UK general election campaign that the Labour Party manifesto was "the best I've ever seen" and shared a picture of her polling card with the caption: "Tories OUT."

=== Stalker ===
Allen was stalked for seven years by Alex Gray, who first contacted her in 2008 when he sent her a series of tweets, claiming he had written her song "The Fear", under the Twitter handle "@lilyallenisRIP". He then sent Allen threatening letters to her home, her clothes shop, her record label and her manager's office. In October 2015, he sent an email to his mother stating he was planning on murdering a celebrity and went on to spend nights in Allen's back garden, broke into her bedroom whilst she was sleeping, and ultimately forced Allen to move. Allen criticised the Metropolitan Police for their inaction, which included refusals to show Allen a picture of her stalker, lending her a panic alarm before demanding it back and refusal to believe stalking incidents were linked. In April 2016, Gray was convicted of burglary and harassment. At Harrow Crown Court on 10 June, Judge Martyn Barklem sentenced him to an indefinite hospital order. Gray was also made the subject of a restraining order and banned from entering the London Borough of Hammersmith and Fulham or the Royal Borough of Kensington and Chelsea.

Allen said that she isolated herself following the stalking incidents, believing that "nobody was taking me seriously because the police weren't taking me seriously". This coincided with her divorce, in which she says "everyone sided with [Cooper]", and her album No Shame became the outlet for her issues.

=== Alleged assault and disparaging remarks ===
Due to her outspokenness, Allen was the subject of many controversies early in her career. She drew attention for disparaging remarks about musicians such as Luke Pritchard of the Kooks, Bob Geldof, Cheryl, Nicola Roberts, Amy Winehouse, Kylie Minogue, and Katy Perry. She later said that making fun of other pop stars was a result of a lack of confidence, saying: "I felt like 'Oh God, I'm short, fat, ugly and I hate all these people who flaunt their beauty.'"

On 28 June 2007, Allen was arrested in London for allegedly assaulting photographer Kevin Rush while she was leaving a nightclub in London's West End. Prior to this, she had expressed discomfort with attention from the paparazzi on her Myspace blog.

In May 2009, French football magazine So Foot published a fake interview in which Allen was quoted as making derogatory remarks about David and Victoria Beckham and Ashley and Cheryl Cole. Some of the material was reprinted in the British tabloid The Sun. Both publications later apologised and paid damages to Allen.

== Discography ==
- Alright, Still (2006)
- It's Not Me, It's You (2009)
- Sheezus (2014)
- No Shame (2018)
- West End Girl (2025)

== Tours ==
Headlining

- Still, Alright? (2007–2008)
- It's Not Me, It's You World Tour (2009–2010)
- Sheezus Tour (2014–2015)
- No Shame Tour (2018–2019)
- Lily Allen Performs West End Girl (2026)

As solo supporting act

- Miley Cyrus' Bangerz Tour (North America, 2014)

== Filmography ==
List of television and films credits
Year	Title	Role	Notes
1988	The Comic Strip Presents...	Child in Promo	"The Yob" (Season 4; Episode 4)
1998	Elizabeth	Lady in Waiting	
2006	Never Mind the Buzzcocks	Guest panelist (herself)	Series 19, Episode 6
2007	Saturday Night Live	Musical Guest (Herself)	"Drew Barrymore/Lily Allen" (Season 32; Episode 12)
2007	The Big Fat Quiz of the Year	Herself	
2008	Lily Allen and Friends	Host (Herself)	Talk show
2009	Neighbours	Herself	Guest starring, soap opera (1 episode)
2011	Lily Allen: From Riches to Rags	Herself	TV series documentary
2019	How to Build a Girl	Elizabeth Taylor	
2023	Dreamland	Mel	Lead role, 6 episodes
2025	Saturday Night Live	Musical Guest (Herself)	"Josh O'Connor/Lily Allen" (Season 51; Episode 8)
2026	Virginia Woolf's Night and Day	Mary Datchet	

List of stage credits
Year	Title	Role	Venue
2021	2:22 A Ghost Story	Jenny	Noël Coward Theatre, London
2023	The Pillowman	Katurian	Duke of York's Theatre, London
2025	Hedda	Hedda Gabler	Ustinov Studio, Bath, Somerset
