= List of awards and nominations received by Lily Allen =

Lily Allen awards and nominations
Awards and nominations
Award	Wins	Nominations
BRIT Awards	1	12
Grammy Awards	0	1
Ivor Novello Awards	3	3
Mercury Prize	0	1
MTV Europe Music Awards	0	2
MTV Video Music Awards	0	1
NME Awards	3	12
NRJ Music Awards	0	3
Q Awards	1	3

Totals (Note: Certain award groups do not simply award one winner. They acknowledge several different recipients, have runners-up, and have third place. Since this is a specific recognition and is different from losing an award, runner-up mentions are considered wins in this award tally. For simplification and to avoid errors, each award in this list has been presumed to have had a prior nomination.)
- Wins: 31
- Nominations: 76

Lily Allen is an English singer, songwriter and actress. Allen’s music career incorporates elements of electropop, R&B, and reggae. Allen’s first album Alright, Still was released in 2006, earning a triple platinum certification in the United Kingdom and a gold certification in the United States. Allen's 2009 album It's Not Me, It's You was certified triple platinum in the United Kingdom. their third album Sheezus was released in 2014, receiving a gold certification in the United Kingdom, and fourth album No Shame was released in 2018.

Allen has received 31 awards and 76 nominations for their music, including nominations for nine BRIT Awards (one won), one Grammy Award, three Ivor Novello Awards (three won), one Mercury Prize and twelve NME Awards (three won). They have also been nominated for one Laurence Olivier Award for their work in theatre.

== Awards and nominations ==
Award	Year	Nominee(s)	Category	Result	Ref.
Antville Music Video Awards	2009	"Fuck You"	Most Fun Video	Nominated	
BMI London Awards	2008	"Smile"	Pop Award	Won	
BMI London Awards	2010	"The Fear"	Pop Award	Won	
BMI London Awards	2012	"5 O'Clock"	Pop Award	Won	
BMI London Awards	2014	"True Love"	Pop Award	Won	
BMI Pop Awards	2015	"True Love"	Award-Winning Song	Won	
BMI Urban Awards	2012	"5 O'Clock"	Award-Winning Song	Won	
BT Digital Music Awards	2006	Lily Allen	Best Pop Artist	Won	
BT Digital Music Awards	2006	Lily Allen	Best Artist Campaign	Nominated	
BT Digital Music Awards	2006	Lily Allen	Best Official Music Site	Nominated	
Billboard.com Mid-Year Music Awards	2014	Lily Allen	Best Comeback	Nominated	
Billboard Year-End	2009	"The Fear"	Top Hot Dance Club Play Track	Nominated	
Bravo Otto Awards	2007	Lily Allen	Newcomer of the Year	Nominated	
BreakTudo Awards	2019	Cultura Inglesa Festival	International Performance	Nominated	
Brit Awards	2007	Lily Allen	British Breakthrough Act	Nominated	
Brit Awards	2007	Lily Allen	British Female Solo Artist	Nominated	
Brit Awards	2007	Alright, Still	British Album of the Year	Nominated	
Brit Awards	2007	"Smile"	British Single of the Year	Eliminated	
Brit Awards	2010	Lily Allen	British Female Solo Artist	Won	
Brit Awards	2010	It's Not Me, It's You	British Album of the Year	Nominated	
Brit Awards	2010	"The Fear"	British Single of the Year	Nominated	
Brit Awards	2015	Lily Allen	British Female Solo Artist	Nominated	
Brit Awards	2019	Lily Allen	British Female Solo Artist	Nominated	
Brit Awards	2026	Lily Allen	British Artist of the Year	Nominated	
Brit Awards	2026	Lily Allen	Best Pop Act	Nominated	
Brit Awards	2026	West End Girl	British Album of the Year	Nominated	
Classic Pop Reader Awards	2019	Lily Allen	Artist of the Year	Nominated	
Classic Pop Reader Awards	2019	No Shame	Album of the Year	Nominated	
Classic Pop Reader Awards	2019	"Lost My Mind"	Single of the Year	Nominated	
Classic Pop Reader Awards	2019	My Thoughts Exactly	Book of the Year	Nominated	
Digital Spy Reader Awards	2018	Lily Allen	Best Singer	Nominated	
Diversity In Media Awards	2017	Lily Allen	Hero of the Year	Won	
Dork Readers’ Poll	2025	Lily Allen	Best Comeback	Nominated	
European Festival Awards	2009	"Fuck You"	Anthem of the Year	Nominated	
Grammy Awards	2008	Alright, Still	Best Alternative Music Album	Nominated	
Ivor Novello Awards	2010	Lily Allen	Songwriter of the Year	Won	
Ivor Novello Awards	2010	"The Fear"	Best Song Musically and Lyrically	Won	
Ivor Novello Awards	2010	"The Fear"	Most Performed Work	Won	
Ivor Novello Awards	2026	Lily Allen	Outstanding Song Collection	Won	
Ivor Novello Awards	2026	West End Girl	Best Album	Nominated	
Laurence Olivier Awards	2022	2:22 A Ghost Story	Best Actress	Nominated	
RTHK International Pop Poll Awards	2007	Lily Allen	Top New Act	Silver	
RTHK International Pop Poll Awards	2007	"Smile"	Top Ten International Gold Songs	Won	
RTHK International Pop Poll Awards	2010	"The Fear"	Top Ten International Gold Songs	Nominated	
RTHK International Pop Poll Awards	2015	Lily Allen	Top Female Artist	Nominated	
Tokio Hot 100 Awards	2009	Lily Allen	Best Female Artist	Nominated	
UK Festival Awards	2006	Lily Allen	Best Breakthrough Act	Nominated	
UK Festival Awards	2006	Lily Allen	Festival Pop Act	Nominated	
UK Festival Awards	2006	"Smile"	Anthem of the Summer	Nominated	
UK Festival Awards	2007	Lily Allen	Festival Pop Act	Nominated	
UK Festival Awards	2009	Lily Allen	Festival Fitty of the Year - Girls	Won	
UK Festival Awards	2010	Lily Allen	Best Headline Performance	Nominated	
UK Festival Awards	2010	Lily Allen	Feel-Good Act of the Summer	Nominated	
UK Festival Awards	2010	"Just Be Good to Green"	Anthem of the Year	Nominated	
Virgin Media Music Awards	2006	Lily Allen	Best Solo Artist	Nominated	
Virgin Media Music Awards	2006	Lily Allen	Most Fanciable Female	Nominated	
Virgin Media Music Awards	2007	Lily Allen	Most Fanciable Female	Nominated	
Virgin Media Music Awards	2009	Lily Allen	Hottest Female	Nominated	
Virgin Media Music Awards	2009	Lily Allen	Twit of the Year	Nominated	
Virgin Media Music Awards	2009	It's Not Me, It's You	Best Album	Nominated	
Virgin Media Music Awards	2009	"The Fear"	Best Track	Won	

== Music awards ==
=== Download Music Awards ===
Year	Nominee / work	Award	Result
2009	It's Not Me, It's You	Best Album	Won
2009	"Not Fair"	Best Single	Nominated
2009	"Not Fair"	Best Music Video	Nominated
2009	Lily Allen	Best Female Act	Nominated

=== Elle Style Awards ===
Year	Nominee / work	Award	Result
2014	Lily Allen	UK Recording Artist Female	Won

=== Fonogram Awards ===
Year	Nominee / work	Award	Result
2010	It's Not Me, It's You	Fonogram Award for Best International Modern Pop/Rock Album	Nominated

=== GAFFA Awards ===
==== GAFFA Awards (Denmark) ====
Delivered since 1991, the GAFFA Awards are a Danish award that rewards popular music by the magazine of the same name.

Year	Nominee / work	Award	Result	Ref.
2006	Herself	Best Foreign Female Act	Nominated	

==== GAFFA Awards (Sweden) ====
Delivered since 2010, the GAFFA Awards (Swedish: GAFFA Priset) are a Swedish award that rewards popular music, awarded by the GAFFA magazine.

Year	Nominee / work	Award	Result
2019	Lily Allen	Best International Solo Artist	Nominated

=== Glamour Woman of the Year Awards ===
Lily Allen has received two awards from two nominations.

Year	Nominee / work	Award	Result
2008	Lily Allen	Editor's Special Award	Won
2010	Lily Allen	Best UK Solo Artist	Won

=== Gold Digital Single Awards ===
Year	Nominee / work	Award	Result
2009	Best Track	The Fear	Won

=== Global Mobile Awards ===
Year	Nominee / work	Award	Result
2007	Lily Allen	The Artist Campaign Award	Won

=== IFPI Platinum Europe Awards ===
The Platinum Europe Awards, established in 1996 by the International Federation of the Phonographic Industry (IFPI), recognize artists that have achieved sales of one million copies of an album in Europe.[18] Lily Allen has received two Platinum Award.

Year	Nominee / work	Award	Result
2007	Lily Allen	Album Title Q1 Alright Still	Won
2009	Lily Allen	Album Title Q4 Its Not Me Its You	Won

=== Imagina Awards ===
Year	Nominee / work	Award	Result
2010	Lily Allen	Best Video Clip – Fuck You	Won

=== Ivor Novello Awards ===
The Ivor Novello Awards, named after the Cardiff born entertainer Ivor Novello, are awards for songwriting and composing. They are presented annually in London by the British Academy of Songwriters, Composers and Authors (BASCA) and were first introduced in 1955. Lily Allen won three awards for two of her singles and her songwriting.

Year	Nominee / work	Award	Result	Ref.
2010	Lily Allen	Songwriters of the Year with Greg Kurstin	Won	
2010	"The Fear"	Best Song Musically and Lyrically with Greg Kurstin	Won	
2010	"The Fear"	PRS for Music Most Performed Work	Won	
2026	West End Girl	Best Album	Pending	

=== Los Premios MTV Latinoamérica ===
Los Premios MTV Latinoamérica is the Latin American version of the MTV Video Music Awards. They were established in 2002 to celebrate the top music videos of the year in Latin America and the world. Lil Allen has been nominated once time.

Year	Nominee / work	Award	Result
2007	Lily Allen	Best International New Artist	Nominated

=== Mercury Prize ===
The Mercury Prize is awarded annually to the best British or Irish album of the year. The twelve shortlisted acts receive an "Award of the Year" trophy, and the winner receives an additional trophy. The award was established by the British Phonographic Industry and British Association of Record Dealers. Allen was nominated in 2018.

Year	Nominee / work	Award	Result
2018	No Shame	Mercury Prize	Nominated

=== Meteor Ireland Music Awards ===
The Meteor Music Awards are the national music awards of Ireland, held every year since 2001 and promoted by MCD Productions. Lily Allen has received one award from two nominations

Year	Nominee / work	Award	Result
2007	Lily Allen	Best International Female	Won
2010	Lily Allen	Best International Female	Nominated

=== MP3 Music Awards ===
Year	Nominee / work	Award	Result
2009	"The Fear"	Indie/Rock/Pop Award	Nominated
2010	"Just Be Good to Green"	The RCD Award (Radio / Charts / Downloads)	Nominated

=== MTV Awards ===
==== MTV Australia Video Music Awards ====
The MTV Australia Awards is an annual awards ceremony established in 2005 by MTV Australia. Lily Allen has been nominated once.

Year	Nominee / work	Award	Result
2007	"Smile"	Spankin' New Artist	Nominated

==== MTV Europe Music Awards ====
The MTV Europe Music Awards (EMA) were established in 1994 by MTV Networks Europe to celebrate the most popular music videos in Europe. Lily Allen received two nominations.

Year	Nominee / work	Award	Result
2006	Lily Allen	Best UK & Ireland Act	Nominated
2007	Lily Allen	Artist Choice	Nominated

==== MTV Video Music Awards ====
The MTV Video Music Awards were established in 1984 by MTV to celebrate the top music videos of the year. Allen has been nominated one time.

Year	Nominee / work	Award	Result
2007	Lily Allen	Best New Artist	Nominated

==== MTV Video Music Awards Japan ====
The MTV Video Music Awards Japan are the Japanese version of the MTV Video Music Awards. Initially Japan was part of the MTV Asia Awards, which were part all Asian countries, but because of the musical variety existent in Japan, a factor that neighboring countries have not, and in May 2002 began to hold their own awards independently. Lily Allen has received three nominations.

Year	Nominee / work	Award	Result
2007	"Smile"	Best New Artist Video	Nominated
2007	"Smile"	Best Reggae Video	Nominated
2009	"The Fear"	Best Pop Video	Nominated

==== MTV Video Music Brazil ====
The MTV Video Music Brazil (VMB) was established by MTV Brasil in 1995. Lily Allen has received from two nominations.

Year	Nominee / work	Award	Result
2007	Lily Allen	International Artist	Nominated
2009	Lily Allen	International Artist	Nominated

=== mtvU Woodie Awards ===
mtvU, a division of MTV Networks owned by Viacom, broadcasts a 24-hour television channel available on more than 750 college and university campuses across the United States.[31] mtvU holds an annual awards show, the mtvU Woodie Awards, in which winners are determined by online voting.[32] Lily Allen has been nominated twice.

Year	Nominee / work	Award	Result
2007	Lily Allen	Woodie of the Year	Nominated
2007	"Smile"	Viral Woodie	Nominated

=== Music Video Production Awards ===
The MVPA Awards are annually presented by a Los Angeles-based music trade organization to honor the year's best music videos.

Year	Nominee / work	Award	Result
2007	"Smile"	Best Director of a New Artist	Won

=== Music Week Awards ===
Year	Nominee / work	Award	Result	Ref.
2007	Lily Allen	UK Marketing Campaign of the Year	Won	
2026	Lily Allen	Artist Marketing Campaign	Pending	
2026	Lily Allen	PR Campaign	Pending	

=== NME Awards ===
==== NME Awards USA ====
Year	Nominee / work	Award	Result
2008	Lily Allen	Best New International/Indie Alternative Solo Artist	Nominated

==== Shockwaves NME Awards ====
The NME Awards are an annual music awards show founded by the music magazine NME. Lily Allen has won two awards from eight nominations.

Year	Nominee / work	Award	Result
2007	Lily Allen	Best Solo Artist	Nominated
2007	Lily Allen	Sexiest Woman	Nominated
2007	Lily Allen	Worst Dressed	Won
2007	Alright, Still	Worst Album	Nominated
2008	Lily Allen	Best Band Blog	Nominated
2010	Lily Allen	Giving It Back Fan Award	Won
2011	Lily Allen	Best Band Blog	Nominated
2014	Lily Allen	Best Solo Artist	Won
2014	Hard Out Here	Best Track	Nominated
2014	Hard Out Here	Best Video	Nominated
2018	"Trigger Bang" (with Giggs)	Best Collaboration	Nominated

=== NRJ Music Awards ===
The NRJ Music Awards, created in 2000 by the radio station NRJ in partnership with the television network TF1. Lily Allen has been nominated three times.

Year	Nominee / work	Award	Result
2007	Lily Allen	International Revelation of the Year	Nominated
2010	Lily Allen	International Female Artist of the Year	Nominated
2010	"Fuck You"	International Song of the Year	Nominated

=== Popjustice £20 Music Prize ===
Year	Nominee / work	Award	Result
2006	"Smile"		Nominated
2009	"The Fear"		Nominated

=== Premios Oye! ===
Premios Oye! are presented annually by the Academia Nacional de la Música en México for outstanding achievements in Mexican record industry. Lily Allen has won one award..

Year	Nominee / work	Award	Result
2007	Alright, Still	English Breakthrough of the Year	Won

=== Q Awards ===
Q Awards were established in 1985 and the UK's annual music awards run by the music magazine Q. Lily Allen has received one award from three nominations.

Year	Nominee / work	Award	Result
2006	Lily Allen	Best New Act	Nominated
2007	"Alfie"	Best Video	Nominated
2009	"The Fear"	Best Track	Won

=== Rober Awards Music Poll ===
Year	Nominee / work	Award	Result
2009	Lily Allen	Guilty Pleasure	Nominated

=== Teen Choice Awards ===
The Teen Choice Awards were established in 1999 to honor the year's biggest achievements in music, movies, sports and television, being voted by young people aged between 13 and 19. Lily Allen has been nominated once .

Year	Nominee / work	Award	Result
2007	Lily Allen	Choice Music: Breakout Artist – Female	Nominated

=== The Sun's Bizarre Awards ===
Year	Nominee / work	Award	Result
2006	Lily Allen	Best New Act	Won

=== The Record of the Year Awards ===
Year	Nominee / work	Award	Result
2006	Lily Allen	Smile – 9th	Nominated
2009	Lily Allen	The Fear – 5th	Nominated

=== TMF Awards ===
Year	Nominee / work	Award	Result
2006	Lily Allen	Best International New Artist	Nominated

=== UK Music Video Awards ===
Year	Nominee / work	Award	Result
2008	"Oh My God" (with Mark Ronson)	Best Visual Effects in a Video	Nominated
2009	"The Fear	Best Art Direction in a Video	Nominated
2009	"22"	Best Telecine in a Video	Nominated
2010	"Fuck You"	Best Visual Effects in a Video	Nominated

=== Urban Music Awards UK ===
The Urban Music Awards is a British awards ceremony launched in 2003 to recognize the achievement of urban-based artists, producers, nightclubs, DJs, radio stations, and record labels.[39] Lily Allen has received one award from two nominations.

Year	Nominee / work	Award	Result
2006	Alright, Still	Best Album	Won
2006	Lily Allen	Best Crossover Chart Act	Nominated

=== Vodafone Live Music Awards ===
Year	Nominee / work	Award	Result
2007	Lily Allen	Best Female Live	Nominated

=== World Music Awards ===
Year	Nominee / work	Award	Result
2014	Herself	World's Best Female Artist	Nominated
2014	Herself	World's Best Live Act	Nominated
2014	Herself	World's Best Entertainer of the Year	Nominated
2014	"True Love" (ft. Pink)	World's Best Song	Nominated
2014	"Somewhere Only We Know"	World's Best Song	Nominated
2014	"Hard Out Here"	World's Best Song	Nominated
2014	"Hard Out Here"	World's Best Video	Nominated

=== Žebřík Music Awards ===
Year	Nominee / work	Award	Result	Ref.
2006	Herself	Best International Discovery	Nominated	
2009	Herself	Best International Female	Nominated	

== Theatre awards ==
=== Glamour Women of the Year Awards ===
Year	Nominee / work	Award	Result
2023	Lily Allen	Theatre Actor of the Year	Won

=== WhatsOnStage Awards ===
Year	Nominee / work	Award	Result
2022	2:22 A Ghost Story	Best Actress in a Play	Won

== Other ==
=== Futurebook Awards ===
Year	Nominee / work	Award	Result
2018	My Thoughts Exactly	Book of the Year	Nominated

=== GQ Men of the Year Awards ===
Year	Nominee / work	Award	Result
2009	Lily Allen	Woman of the Year	Won

=== Highstreet Fashion Awards ===
Year	Nominee / work	Award	Result
2008	Lily Allen	Best Dressed Celebrity	Nominated

=== Morgan Awards ===
Year	Nominee / work	Award	Result
2009	Lily Allen	Best Insult	Won
