= London Festival Fringe =

The London Festival Fringe is a festival that promotes art and entertainment in London, England. In addition to helping artists and performers stage their work, the festival runs the London Awards for Art and Performance each year in various art categories including Jazz Music, Theatre, Comedy and Film.

== Origins ==
The origins of the London Festival Fringe started in the London Borough of Southwark as a festival to promote the London Bridge area, in London's East End. Initiated by a group of volunteers and enthusiast, the London Bridge festival was held in July 2009. With support from the Southwark council and local businesses, the festival saw over 30 events in the span of three weeks, including stand up comedy, live music, film and art performances, concentrated mainly along Borough high Street and Tooley Street near London Bridge underground and railway station.

With the success of the event, and an increasing interest in theatre performances, and the lack of suitable theatre venues in the area spurred organizers to expand the scope of the festival to include London's West End, becoming the London Festival Fringe.

== Organization ==
The festival is run by London Bridge Festival Limited, a non-profit company, that was established by a group of enthusiasts and residents of the Southwark Borough. The festival committee acts as a facilitator to artists and performers by providing infrastructure and logistics support, and selling tickets, but does not organize shows

Venues and areas spanning the festival, are clustered around London's West End and the London Bridge area, where the festival saw its beginnings. The festival also runs a London Awards for Art and Performance for Theatre and Playwright, Jazz and New Music, New Comedy, Poetry and Photography. Awards are judged based on a panel of judges selected from established artists and performers on the London circuit.

The first festival was held in 2010 with over 50 shows and events, of which more than half were fringe theatre productions.

== See also ==
- Fringe Theatre
