= Carrie Etter =

American poet

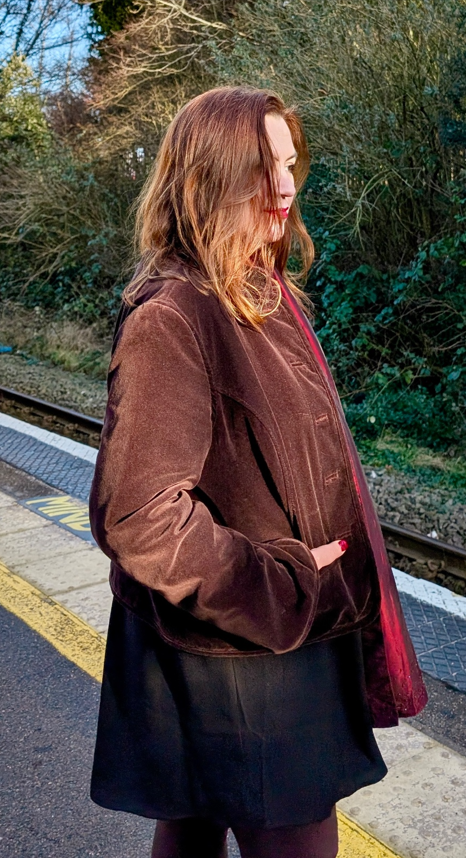
- Born: 1969 (age 56–57)
- Education: University of California, Los Angeles, University of California, Irvine
- Occupation: Professor
- Writing career
- Genre: Poetry
- Notable awards: London Awards for Art and Performance
- Website: carrieetter.blogspot.com

Carrie Etter (born 1969) is an American-born poet, prose poet, critic, and academic. Her work addresses themes of trauma and grief through formal innovation in poetry, the craft of poetry (particularly prose poetry and ecopoetry), 20th and 21st-century poetry criticism, and the contemporary short story. Her work has been published in the UK and internationally.

== Biography ==
Originally from Normal, Illinois, Etter moved to Southern California at the age of 19, and on to London in 2001.

Etter holds a BA from the University of California, Los Angeles, and an MFA, MA and PhD from the University of California, Irvine, gaining her doctorate in 2003 in English on mid-Victorian fiction and early British criminology. She was a visiting lecturer at the University of Hertfordshire for 2003–2004, teaching short-story writing and literature, and she was a Reader at Bath Spa University, where she taught between 2004 and 2022. She is currently guiding the new poetry provision in University of Bristol's Masters in Creative Writing.

Etter's work has been published and reviewed abroad as well as in the UK. Her poems have appeared on the Poetry Society website, in The New Statesman, Poetry Review, The Rialto and The Times Literary Supplement, while in the US her poems have appeared in The Iowa Review, The New Republic, and Seneca Review. She is also an essayist and a critic. Her reviews of contemporary poetry have appeared in The Independent, The Guardian, and The Times Literary Supplement. Etter has published essays on Peter Reading, W. B. Yeats, and Sherman Alexie. Her poetry collections have been published by Seren Books and Shearsman Books.

In 2025, Etter launched her own press, Fox and Star Books, aimed at publishing underrepresented poets.

== Form and Poetics ==
Etter's academic research informs her published poetry. Within the craft of poetry, Etter focuses on the specific praxis of formal poetry and prose poetry. Much of her work examines how these forms can address grief and trauma, guilt and family. Etter is also interested in ecopoetry and has published her work in this area; her work has represented a synthesis between grief and ecology in the face of climate disaster. Her critical work extends to 20th and 21st-century poetry, and the contemporary short story.

Etter's work on the praxis of prose poetry has been cited in academic studies. She delivers talks and contributes essays on the subject, dealing with both theory and practice. Etter's poems, exploring her core thematics, have appeared in international anthologies (see Anthologies. Etter has participated in initiatives relating to widening participation in literature and creative writing. She has been involved in readings, writing workshops and collaborations with organisations such as the Bristol Poetry Institute and The Poetry Society.

For her practice in short stories, Etter was the recipient of an Author's Foundation Grant, as well as a Developing Your Own Creative Practice Grant from Arts Council England. The culmination of this funding is a longer piece of fiction, a novel titled All the Way Home.

== Critical reception ==
Etter won a 2010 London Awards for Art and Performance for a best first collection published in the UK and Ireland in the preceding year for The Tethers. In 2013, she received an Authors' Foundation grant from the Society of Authors for work on her third collection, Imagined Sons, which went on to be shortlisted for the 2014 Ted Hughes Award for New Work in Poetry by the Poetry Society.

Of her most recent collection Grief's Alphabet, the poet Rishi Dastidar commented in The Guardian: "Etter has the ability to floor you as she explores guilt(...) and makes every day observations that are anything but banal."

== Poetry collections ==
- Subterfuge of the Unrequitable: Poets & Poets Press, 1998, ISBN 978-0-937013-79-3 (pamphlet/chapbook)
- Yet: Leafe Press, 2008, ISBN 978-0-9535401-9-8 (pamphlet/chapbook)
- The Tethers: Seren Books, 2009, ISBN 978-1-85411-492-1
- The Son: Oystercatcher Press, 2009, ISBN 978-1-905885-24-4 (pamphlet/chapbook)
- Divining for Starters: Shearsman Books, 2011, ISBN 9781848611504
- Imagined Sons: Seren Books, 2014, ISBN 9781781721513
- The Weather in Normal: Seren Books (UK) and Station Hill Press (USA), 2018, ISBN 9781581771749
- Grief's Alphabet: Seren Books, 2024, ISBN 9781781727508

== Anthologies ==
- Carrie Etter (ed) Infinite Difference: Other Poetries by UK Women Poets, Shearsman Books, 2010, ISBN 978-1-84861-099-6
