= Nadav Kander =

Israeli photographer (born 1961)

Nadav Kander HonFRPS
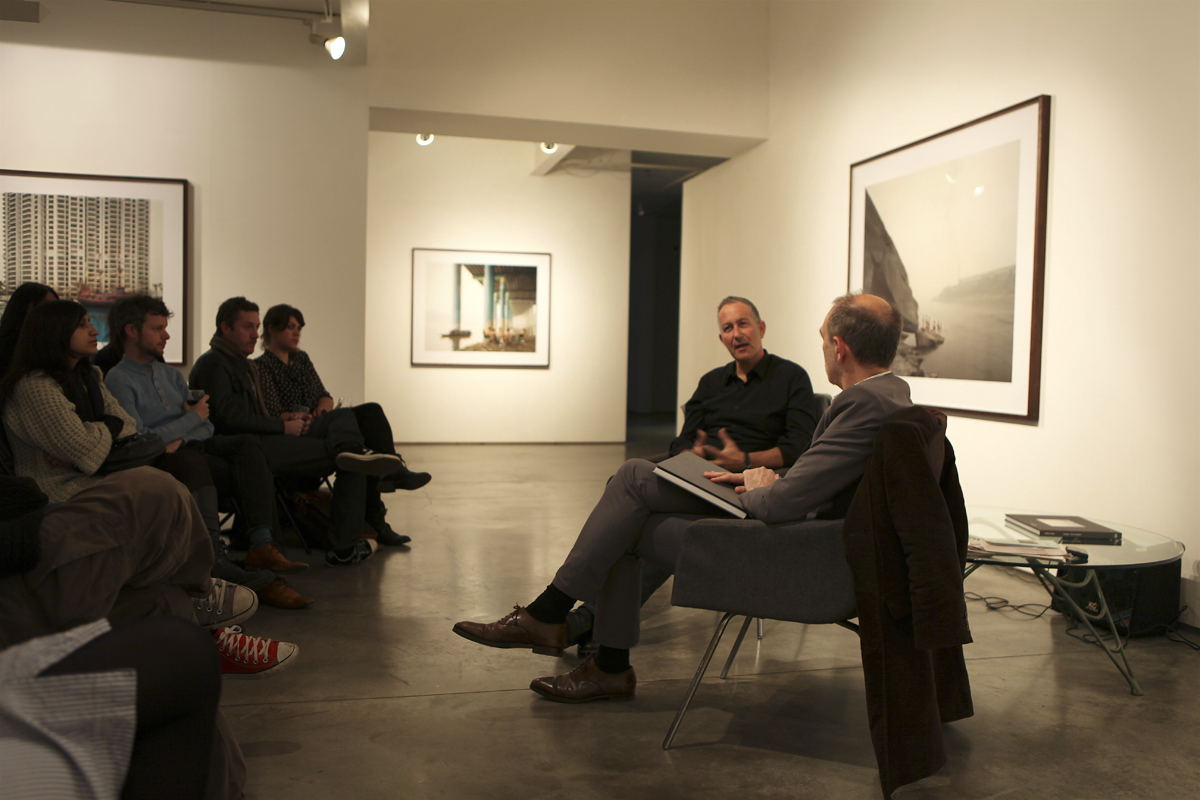
- Philip Dodd 'In Conversation' with Nadav Kander, Flowers Gallery, London 2010
- Born: נדב קנדר; 1961 (age 64–65); Tel Aviv, Israel
- Known for: Photography, Artist, Director
- Website: nadavkander.com

Nadav Kander HonFRPS (Hebrew: נדב קנדר; born 1961) is an Israeli-born photographer, artist and director based in London, known for his portraiture and landscapes. Kander has produced a number of books and had his work exhibited widely. He received an Honorary Fellowship from the Royal Photographic Society in 2015, and won the Prix Pictet award.

== Life and work ==
Kander was born in Tel Aviv, Israel. His father flew Boeing 707s for El-Al but lost his eye and was unable to continue flying. His parents decided to start again in South Africa and moved to Johannesburg in 1963. Kander began taking pictures when he was 13 on a Pentax camera, which he bought with his Bar Mitzvah money. He states the pictures that he took then and until he was 17, although unaccomplished, have the same sense of quiet and unease that is part of his work today. After being drafted into the South African Air Force, Kander worked in a darkroom printing aerial photographs. It was there he became certain he wanted to be a photographer. He moved to London in 1986, where he still resides with his wife Nicole and their three children.

Kander is best known for his Yangtze - The Long River series, for which he earned the Prix Pictet Prize. Kander never photographed farther than twenty miles from the river itself. In the shadow of epic construction projects we see workers, fishermen, swimmers and a man washing his motorbike in the river. Dense architecture gives way to mountains in the upper reaches towards the river's Tibetan source - a sparsely populated area where the stream is mostly broken ice and just ankle deep. The photographs are dominated by immense architectural structures where humans are shown as small in their environment. Figures are dwarfed by landscapes of half completed bridges and colossal Western-style apartment blocks that are rapidly replacing traditional Chinese low-rise buildings and houseboats.

In 2010 to 2012 Kander photographed a series of nudes - Bodies. 6 Women. 1 Man - in his London studio.

On 18 January 2009, Kander had 52 full colour portraits published in one issue of The New York Times Magazine. These portraits were of the people surrounding US President Barack Obama, from Joe Biden (Vice President) to Eugene Kang (Special Assistant to The President). This is the largest portfolio of work by the same photographer The New York Times Magazine has showcased in one single issue.

In July 2012, Kander exhibited at the National Portrait Gallery in London with a series of portraits celebrating London's hosting of the 2012 Summer Olympics. In 2014 Kander was among the 18 photographers chosen to be a part of Constructing Worlds: Photography and Architecture in the Modern Age, an exhibition at the Barbican Centre in London, and toured, which explored the ability of architectural photography to reveal wider truths about our society.

His photography for the 2016 TIME Person of the Year cover was widely analyzed and acclaimed.

Kander is a Trustee of The Lowry in Salford, Greater Manchester.

== Publications ==
=== Publications by Kander ===
- Nadav Kander - Night. 2000.
- Beauty's Nothing. Arena Editions, 2001.
- Obama's People. London: Flowers Gallery, 2010. ISBN 978-1-906412-27-2.
- Yangtze - The Long River. Ostfildern: Hatje Cantz, 2010. ISBN 978-3-7757-2683-2.
- Bodies. 6 Women, 1 Man. Ostfildern: Hatje Cantz, 2013. ISBN 978-3-7757-3449-3.
- Dust. Ostfildern: Hatje Cantz, 2014. ISBN 978-3-7757-3843-9.
- Dark Line - The Thames Estuary. Flowers Gallery, 2017.ISBN 978-1-906412-81-4.

=== Contributions to publications ===
- Contatti. Provini d'Autore = Choosing the best photo by using the contact sheet. Vol. II. Edited by Giammaria De Gasperis. Rome: Postcart, 2013. ISBN 978-88-98391-01-1.

== Exhibitions ==
- 2001: Beauty's Nothing, Yancey Richardson Gallery, New York
- 2005: Keep Your Distance, Palais de Tokyo Paris
- 2005: Obama's People, Birmingham Museum and Art Gallery, Birmingham, England
- 2010: Obama's People - Nadav Kander / The Family - Richard Avedon, The Kennedys (museum) Berlin, Germany
- 2010: Prix Pictet Laureates, Musée de l'Élysée Lausanne, Switzerland
- 2011: Selected Portraits 1999-2011, The Lowry, Manchester, UK
- 2011: Infinite Balance: Artists and the Environment, Museum of Photographic Arts, San Diego
- 2011: Body Gestures, Herzliya Museum of Contemporary Art, Israel
- 2011: Yangtze – The Long River, Forum Fur Fotografie, Cologne, Germany
- 2012: Road to 2012, National Portrait Gallery, London
- 2013: Landmark: Fields of Photography, Somerset House, London
- 2014: Yangtze - The Long River, Patrick and Beatrice Haggerty Museum of Art, Milwaukee, WI
- 2014: Dust, Rencontres d'Arles festival, Arles, France
- 2014–2015: Constructing Worlds: Photography and Architecture in the Modern Age
  - Barbican Centre, London, 2014
  - The Swedish Centre for Architecture and Design, Stockholm, 2015
  - Museo ICO, Madrid, 2015
- 2015: Grace of Intention: Photography, Architecture and the Monument, Museum of Contemporary Photography, Chicago
- 2016: Prix Pictet Laureates, Mouravieff-Apostol House & Museum, Moscow, 2014
- 2017: Britain In Focus: A Photographic History, National Media Museum, Bradford, UK
- 2017: Proof of Life / Lebenszeichen Weserburg, Weserburg Museum, Germany
- 2017: Looking Good: The Male Gaze From Van Dyck to Lucian Freud, Scottish National Portrait Gallery
- 2018: Powerful Tides: 400 years of Chatham and the sea, Historical Dockyard, London
- 2026: The Edge of Things, foam, Amsterdam

== Awards ==
- 2002: Terence Donovan Award, Royal Photographic Society, Bath
- 2008: Silver Photographer of the Year, Lianzhou International Photo Festival, China
- 2009: Winner, Prix Pictet 'Earth' 2009 for Yangtze - The Long River
- 2009: International Photographer of the Year, 7th Annual Lucie Awards
- 2011: Photography category, London Awards for Art and Performance, London
- 2013: 1st Prize, Staged Portraits Singles, World Press Photo, Amsterdam
- 2015: Honorary Fellowship, Royal Photographic Society, Bath
- 2019: Outstanding Contribution to Photography, Sony World Photography Awards, London
