= Roya Megnot =

American actress

- Born: Roya Lesa Megnot; May 29, 1962; Detroit, Michigan, U.S.
- Died: May 10, 2009 (aged 46); Beverly Hills
- Occupation: Actress
- Years active: 1984–1998
- Children: 4

Roya Megnot (May 29, 1962 – May 10, 2009) was an American actress who played mainly in television films and series.

== Early years ==
Megnot was born in Detroit, Michigan, on May 29, 1962. She was the daughter of Perviz Megnot and Lillian Wassil Megnot. She grew up in Ann Arbor, Michigan. She attended Greenhills School and Huron High School there. As a theater major at the University of Michigan she performed in college plays. She received additional training at the University of Washington's Professional Actor Training Programs, the Weist-Barron School of Television Acting in Detroit, and the New York Academy of Theatrical Arts in New York City.

== Career ==
Megnot portrayed Ava Rescott on the ABC soap opera Loving from 1984 to 1988 and March–May 1990. She gained the role after a secretary in her graduate school sent her photograph to the casting director for General Hospital. She passed a screen test and was offered the part, but she turned it down because she did not want to move to California. However, an audition in New York led to her being cast as Ava. She left the show after four years, seeking "to do other things". She returned to the theater, in which she had been active before she took the television role.

== Personal life and death ==
Megnot was married to a doctor and had four children. She died of a brain tumor on May 10, 2009.

== Filmography ==
=== Television ===
- 1998 : Thirst
- 1991 : The 100 Lives of Black Jack Savage (TV Movie) : Reya Montenegro
- 1987 : Night Rose : Kara Akhbar

=== TV series ===
- 1992 : Silk Stalkings : Mia Cortez
- 1992 : MacGyver : Mukti
- 1991 : The 100 Lives of Black Jack Savage (TV Series)
- 1991 : Tales from the Crypt (Easel Kill Ya" episode) : Sharon
- 1990 : DEA : Isabella Solana
- 1990 : Quantum Leap : Sybil (Episode 2–19)
- 1989 : True Blue
- 1984–1988, 1990 : Loving : Ava Rescott
