= Kathryn A. McCarthy =

American physicist and academic administrator

Kathryn A. McCarthy (August 7, 1924 – December 24, 2014) was an American physicist who studied "the physical, optical and thermal properties of optical crystalline materials", became the youngest faculty member ever hired at Tufts University and, later, became the first woman to serve as provost at Tufts.

== Life ==
McCarthy was born on August 7, 1924, in Andover, Massachusetts, and went to school in Andover. She majored in mathematics at Tufts, graduating Phi Beta Kappa with an A.B. in 1944 from Tufts's Jackson College for Women, and in 1946 she earned a master's degree in physics from Tufts. In the same year, she was hired as a lecturer at Tufts, becoming "the youngest faculty member in Tufts history". She began doctoral studies at Radcliffe College in 1953, and completed her Ph.D. there in 1957, earning a promotion to assistant professor and then, in 1962, to full professor. During the mid-1960s, she also hosted a physics television show on the local public television station, WGBH-TV.

In 1969, McCarthy became dean of arts and sciences at Tufts, and in 1973, she was named as provost and senior vice president under president Burton Crosby Hallowell. She was provost until 1979, the first woman to hold that position at Tufts. She retired in 1994.

== Recognition ==
In 1967, McCarthy was named a Fellow of the American Physical Society. She was also given honorary doctorates by the College of the Holy Cross and Merrimack College.

On her retirement in 1994, the triennial Kathryn A. McCarthy Lectureship in Physics was established at Tufts in her honor. Past lecturers have included Laurie McNeil (2000), Frances Hellman (2004), Laura Greene (2007), Deborah S. Jin (2010), Susan Coppersmith (2013), Meg Urry (2016), and Xiaowei Zhuang (2019).
