= Huron High School (Ann Arbor, Michigan) =

Public high school in Michigan, US

Ann Arbor Huron High School

Location
- 2727 Fuller Rd. Ann Arbor, Michigan; United States; 42°16′54″N 83°42′12″W

Information
- Type: Public high school
- Established: September 1969
- Locale: Ann Arbor Public Schools
- Principal: Claire Federhofer
- Teaching staff: 109.51 (FTE)
- Grades: 9th-12th
- Enrollment: 1,635 (2023-2024)
- Student to teacher ratio: 14.93
- Campus: Urban, 230 acres (0.9308 km^{2})
- Colors: Forest Green; Old Gold
- Mascot: River Rat
- Website: https://huron.a2schools.org/

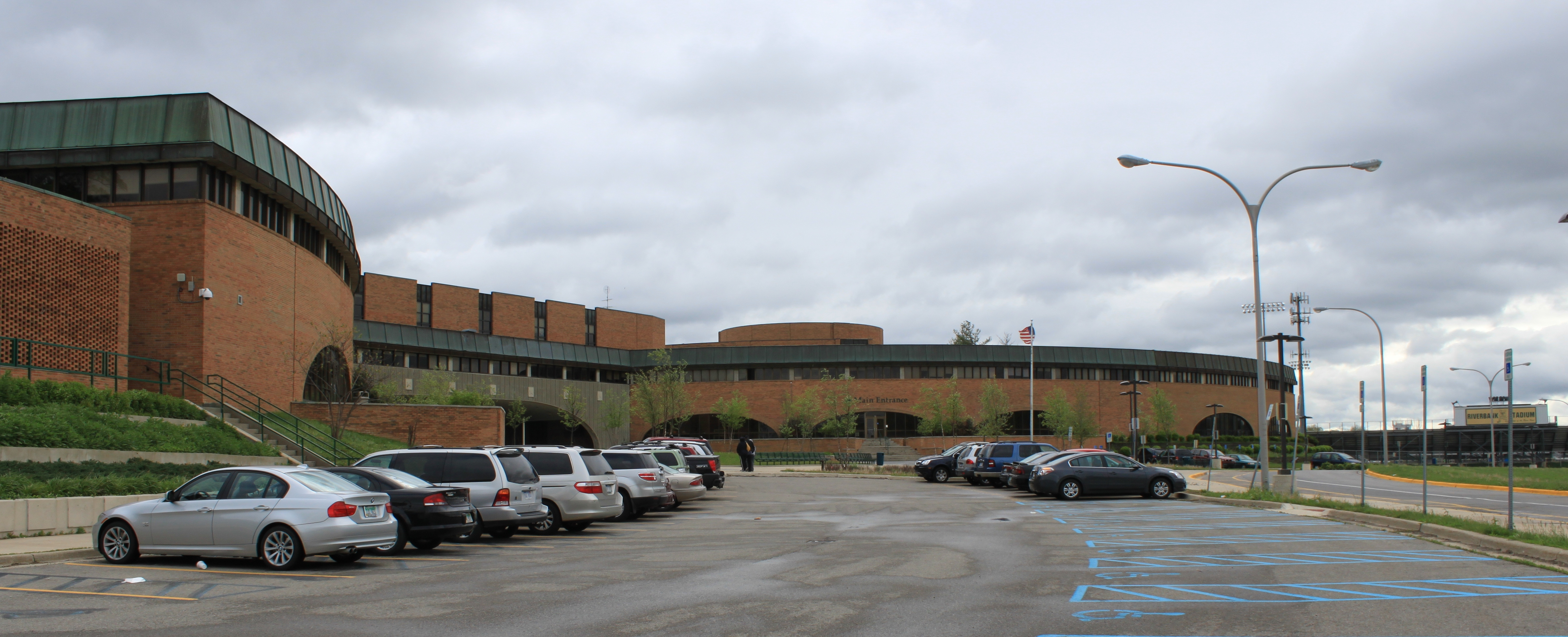
Huron High School

Ann Arbor Huron High School, or Huron High School (HHS), is a public high school located in Ann Arbor, MI, in the U.S. The school is part of the Ann Arbor Public Schools district. Located at 2727 Fuller Road in eastern Ann Arbor near the banks of the Huron River, it serves grades 9 through 12. Huron is one of the three main public high schools in Ann Arbor (along with Pioneer High School and Skyline High School). Newsweek named the school one of America's Best High Schools in 2012, and it was awarded Best Overall Academic Performance in Michigan by BusinessWeek in 2009 and 2010.

The school is shaped like an "H" with two convex wings adjoined by a two floor archway that has become a distinguishing feature of the building. Huron is a Division I member of the Michigan High School Athletic Association (MHSAA) for athletic competition. The school offers 50 different sports comprising 32 varsity level teams, several of them frequently crowned state champions.

== History ==
Huron High School opened in September 1969. Prior to Huron's opening, the student body at the city's only other public high school, Ann Arbor High, experienced overcrowding. In 1967-68 and 1968–69, before Huron's building was completed, eastside students who were to be designated to the new school shared the Pioneer building in a split schedule. Pioneer students attended classes in the morning from 7:30 A.M. to 12:30 P.M. and Huron students in the afternoon from 1 P.M. to 6 P.M, despite petitions from Huron students to the Board of Education for them to attend school in the morning.

Due to delays from construction strikes and other issues the planned opening date was pushed back two years from 1967 to 1969. In July 1969, Paul K. Meyers, the first principal of Huron High School, and assistant principal Albert Gallup and staff moved in.

When Huron opened, the school board deliberated over what the new high school would be named. A committee, along with roughly fifty local residents was formed and easily picked Huron, named for the Huron River on which the school sits. When it came time for deciding on the name of the school's sports teams, things didn't go so easily. Disparagingly, students at the original high school in town, Pioneer, referred to the students who had moved to the new school as "sewer rats". Tying that in with a somewhat gruesome student prank that occurred in its first weeks open, students had it on their minds when a poll was taken among the school community to determine the name, "River Rats" was suggested as a write-in option. Despite opposition from the school board, the principal of the school had promised students he would abide by their decision, and the "River Rat" name won the vote. When the press began using the term "River Rats", the school board acquiesced.

In February 2025, the school voted to name the River Rat mascot, choosing "Rio", a reference to the nearby Huron river. This marked the first time in the school's history their mascot had an official name.

From 1969 to 1979, Paul K. Meyers served as principal, and was succeeded by Ronald Tesch. His goal was to revive and enhance the cooperation and communication between the school faculty and student body. He left the position in 1986, and from 1986 to 1987, Al Gallup served as interim principal. In 1987, Huron saw Dr. Joetta Mial begin her tenure as principal, which she served as until 1993. In 1988, the Ann Arbor Board of Education passed a $31 million renovation and construction program. From 1988 to 1991, Huron underwent major renovations in which library and lunchrooms were expanded, and a band room, science and math wings were added. The athletic wing was also added and included a new pool and gym. Huron's dome gym and athletic department were constructed during these renovations. On May 12, 1993, the auditorium was dedicated to Paul K. Meyers.

After Dr. Joetta Mial's departure, from 1993 to 1994, Jane Johnson served as interim principal. In 1994, Dr. Arthur Williams began his tenure at Huron, and was a strong advocate for reforms. He retired in 2014, after serving as principal for 20 years; he has become Huron's longest-serving principal. From the 2014–2015 school year, Jennifer Hein began serving as principal. The current principal is Ché Carter

Overcrowding became an issue again. Portables were used to house classes outside of the main building. In 2008 Skyline High School was opened and slowly branched off the existing two, starting with only a freshman class.

The movie Jumper was filmed on location at Huron High School and neighboring Gallup Park in February 2007. One hundred students were chosen from Huron to be extras for the movie. The screenplay of Jumper was written by Huron High School graduate David S. Goyer and was released in February 2008.

== Academics ==
Student assessments
- 2021–22 school year Change vs. prior year

M-STEP 11th grade proficiency rates (Science / Social Studies)
- Advanced %: 32.5 / 26.0
- Proficient %: 25.4 / 26.3
- PR. Proficient %: 11.5 / 35.3
- Not Proficient %: 30.7 / 12.5

Average test scores
- SAT Total: 1101.6 (▼ −70.2)

As of the 2015–16 school year, IB courses are being offered. It has been an IB school since 2017.

== Extracurricular activities ==
=== Athletics ===
Huron High School is a member of the Michigan High School Athletic Association (MHSAA). Huron joined the Southeastern Conference "SEC" in the 2007–2008 school year.

The Huron athletic program offers the following sports:

- Boys: baseball, basketball, cross country, football, golf, hockey, lacrosse, soccer, swimming & diving, tennis, track and field, water polo, and wrestling
- Girls: basketball, cross country, field hockey, golf, lacrosse, soccer, softball, swimming & diving, synchronized swimming, tennis, track and field, volleyball, water polo, and cheerleading
- Coed: equestrian, crew, bowling, athletic training, and figure skating

=== Publications ===
- The Enthymion: the school yearbook
- The Emery: the school newspaper. Beginning in 2009 The Emery began expanding online as well as maintaining its regular paper publication.
- Full Circle: the school's annually-published literary magazine. The publication contains student-submitted poetry, prose, and artwork.

== Notable alumni ==
=== Sports ===
- Zeke Jones (1985): silver medalist in wrestling at the 1992 Summer Olympics
- James "Lights Out" Toney (1986): professional boxer
- Annette Salmeen (1992): gold medalist in swimming at 1996 Summer Olympics
- Andy Hilbert (1999): NHL left wing, New York Islanders
- Elizabeth Armstrong (2001): member of United States women's national water polo team
- Evan Bates (2007): ice dancer, 2015 national champion
- Nathan Gerbe (2005): NHL player for the Columbus Blue Jackets, finalist for the 2007-08 Hobey Baker Award
- Patrick Kane (2006): NHL player for Detroit Redwings, 3-time Stanley Cup Champion
- Alex Shibutani (2009): ice dancer, 2018 Olympic Bronze medalist, 2016 and 2017 national champion, 2010 U.S. Junior national champion
- Maia Shibutani (2012): ice dancer, 2018 Olympic Bronze medalist, 2016 and 2017 national champion, 2010 U.S. Junior national champion
- Cindy Sember (2012): track and field athlete

=== Music and entertainment ===
- David S. Goyer (1984): screenwriter, director and producer
- Lloyd Dangle (1979); visual artist and cartoonist
- Javier Grillo-Marxuach (1987): screenwriter, producer of television series Lost
- Ryan Drummond (1990): actor, singer
- Cherry Chevapravatdumrong (1995): author, executive story editor and co-producer of Family Guy
- Andy Wood (1995): standup comedian, co-founder of Bridgetown Comedy Festival in Portland, OR.
- Mayer Hawthorne (1997): singer, producer, songwriter, DJ, rapper and musician
- Michael Kosta (1998): Stand-up Comedian, Daily Show Correspondent and Other TV Hosting Credentials.
- Jack Falahee (2007): actor known for role as Connor Walsh in ABC's How to Get Away with Murder
- Roya Megnot, actress

=== Media and literature ===
- Susan Goldberg (1977?): journalist, editor-in-chief of National Geographic magazine
- Jay Nordlinger (1982): editor at the National Review
- John Pollack (1984): author, Presidential speech writer
- Julie Orringer (1989): author, How To Breathe Underwater and others
- Jill Carroll (1995): journalist; 2006 kidnapping victim in Iraq
- Angel Nafis (2006): poet

=== Other ===
- Thomas Knoll (1978): co-creator of Adobe Photoshop
- John Knoll (1980): co-creator of Adobe Photoshop, visual effects guru
- Laurie McNeil (1973): physicist
- Paul Whelan (1988): Marine veteran; detained in Russia
