= Greenhills School =

Prep school in Ann Arbor, Michigan, US

Location
- 850 Greenhills Drive; Ann Arbor, Michigan 48105; United States

Information
- Type: Independent Lower, Middle, and Secondary
- Established: September 1968
- Faculty: 92 full-time, 16 part-time
- Grades: JK - 12
- Enrollment: Approximately 810 (110 lower school) (300 middle school) (400 upper school)
- Colors: Green and Navy
- Mascot: Gryphons
- Website: http://www.greenhillsschool.org

Greenhills School is an independent college preparatory school (grades JK–12) in Ann Arbor, Michigan, United States.

== Awards and recognition ==
Greenhills Upper School was recognized as one of six national Intel Schools of Distinction in 2007 for excellence as one of the nation's top schools for science. The program recognizes one school for math and one for science in each of three school ranges (elementary, middle and high school).

== Athletics ==
Greenhills School is a member of the Michigan High School Athletic Association (MHSAA) and offers the following sports:

- Boys: tennis, baseball, basketball, cross country, golf, lacrosse, soccer, track and field, and swimming & diving
- Girls: tennis, basketball, cross country, field hockey, golf, soccer, softball, track and field, swimming & diving and volleyball
- Coed: equestrian. However, both the track and cross country teams have co-ed practices.

The boys tennis team won the Division 4 Lower Peninsula state championship in 2003–4, 2006-7 and 2008-9 through 2015–16. They also won again in 2018. In 2019 the team moved up to division three and won their first state championship there. The team went undefeated that season and ended up as the top ranked team across all divisions - #1 in the power rankings. Their coach, Eric Gajar, was named coach of the year for the state of Michigan. Since 2001, MHSAA has not crowned a true state champion in tennis, opting instead for separate tournaments for the Upper and Lower peninsulas.

In 2017, the men's soccer team won the Division 4 state championship. Jerry Tucker, a senior, scored the lone goal of the match to send the Gryphons to a 1–0 victory.

In January 2023, Gajar was inducted into the Michigan High School Tennis Coach Association (MHSTeCA) Hall of Fame after being a 10-time MHSTeCA Coach of the Year and named the National Federation of High School Coaches Association Coach of the Year in 2016.

== Renovation ==
Greenhills school has begun an expansion project planned to provide an additional 10,000 square feet (930 m^{2}) of space. Much of this space will be used for the sciences, including biology labs and a greenhouse. Of the $6.5 million required for the project, the school has raised $3 million, enough that they began the first phase of construction on 6/9/2009. The proposed renovations, brought forward by alumni Tai Mackey and Parth Ashok, also include a geothermal heating and cooling system, allowing the project to be certified as LEED gold certified.

== Notable alumni ==
- Bora Gulari, sailor
- Eugene Kang, Special Assistant to President Barack Obama
- Roya Megnot, actress
- Elizabeth Meriwether, playwright and screenwriter
- Nicholas Phan, lyric tenor
- Andrew W.K., rock singer, record producer, and actor
- Sabrina Wu, writer and actor
- Dagvin Anderson, United States Air Force lieutenant general
