= Laurie McNeil =

American physicist

Laurie Elizabeth McNeil (born 1956) is an American condensed matter physicist and materials scientist whose research topics have included optical spectroscopy, the properties of crystals and semiconductors, and the synthesis of carbon nanotubes. She is Bernard Gray Distinguished Professor of Physics and Astronomy at the University of North Carolina at Chapel Hill.

McNeil is also a choral mezzo-soprano and has taught many freshman seminars on the physics of music.

== Education and career ==
McNeil was born in Ann Arbor, Michigan on August 19, 1956. After attending Huron High School in Ann Arbor, she graduated from Radcliffe College and Harvard University in 1977 with a bachelor's degree in chemistry and a master's degree in physics, respectively. She went on to the University of Illinois Urbana-Champaign for advanced graduate study in physics, including also summer research at the Los Alamos National Laboratory, earning a second master's degree in 1979 and completing her Ph.D. in 1982. Her dissertation, The effect of pressure on the resistivity and Hall coefficient of amorphous metallic alloys, was supervised by David Lazarus.

After postdoctoral study with Mildred Dresselhaus at the Massachusetts Institute of Technology, supported by IBM, she became an assistant professor of physics and astronomy at the University of North Carolina at Chapel Hill in 1984, with an adjunct appointment in the Curriculum in Applied Sciences. At the time, she was the only woman with a tenure track position in the department. She was promoted to associate professor in 1991 and full professor in 1996. She chaired the Department of Physics and Astronomy from 2004 to 2009, and as chair acted to significantly increase the number of women faculty in the department. She also served as interim chair of the Curriculum in Applied and Materials Sciences from 2007 to 2008.

McNeil chaired the Southeast Section of the American Physical Society (APS) for a term ending in 2012. She also chaired a joint task force of the APS and American Association of Physics Teachers on undergraduate physics education from 2014 to 2018.

== Recognition ==
McNeil was named the Bowman and Gordon Gray Professor at the University of North Carolina in 1996, and named Bernard Gray Distinguished Professor in 2014.

In 2000, she became the inaugural Kathryn A. McCarthy lecturer in physics at Tufts University, and in 2007, she became the inaugural Dorothy Daspit lecturer in science at Tulane University. She was named a Sigma Xi Distinguished Lecturer for 2019–2021.

In 2001, she was named a Fellow of the American Physical Society, after a nomination from the APS Forum on Physics and Society, "for numerous contributions towards improving the climate for women in physics, including extending the Committee on the Status of Women in Physics Academic Site Visit Program and performing an extensive report on the dual-career couple problem." In 2019, the Southeast Section of the APS gave her their George B. Pegram Award for Excellence in Physics Education in the Southeast. In 2021, the APS Office of Government Affairs gave her their Five Sigma Physicist award for her participation in grassroots campaigns advocating government action on science policy issues, including supporting foreign students whose visas were endangered by the lack of in-person classes they could take during the COVID-19 pandemic.
