= London Awards for Art and Performance =

The London Awards for Art and Performance is awarded in 11 different art categories, by the London Festival Fringe.

It is awarded each year, at a central London venue, and is presented to artists and performers who have made an outstanding contribution to their art form.

== Awards ==
Year	Category	Winner
2009	Comedy	Jo Selby
2009	Photography	Daniel Lane
2009	Film
2009	Short Fiction	Through a Glass Darkly, Alex Burger
2009	Music	Kit Richardson
2010	Theatre Writing	Benedict Fogarty, Drawing the Curtains
2010	Short Fiction	Jennifer Thorp
2010	Poetry	Carrie Etter
2010	Photography	Daisy Meadows
2010	Music	New Cut Gang
2010	Jazz Instrumentalist	John Turville
2010	Jazz Vocalist	Norma Winstone, Cleveland Watkiss
2010	Film	3 Lives, Team Alma
2010	Dance	BalletBoyz
2010	Comedy	Don Biswas
2010	Best Play	A Christmas Carol
2010	Art	Andrew Hladky
2011	Poetry	Michael Longley
2011	Photography	Nadav Kander
2011	Music	Wild Beasts
2011	Jazz	Julian Siegel
2011	Film	Submarine, Richard Ayoade
2011	Dance	Balletboyz
2011	Comedy	Zoe Lyons
2011	Book	Stuart Evers "Ten Stories About Smoking"
2011	Best Play	Precious Little Talent
2011	Art	Douglas Gordon
