= List of Loving cast members =

This is a list of actors who appeared on the American soap opera Loving.

== Cast ==
Actor	Role(s)	Duration
Wesley Addy	Cabot Alden	1983–91, 1994–95
Nancy Addison	Deborah Brewster Alden	1993–95
Stan Albers	Curtis Alden	1989–91
Linden Ashby	Curtis Alden	1985–86
Jennifer Ashe	Lily Slater	1983–84
Eden Atwood	Staige Prince	1992
Alimi Ballard	Frankie Hubbard	1993–95
Bernard Barrow	Louie Slavinsky	1989–93
Patricia Barry	Isabelle Alden	1992–93
Noelle Beck	Trisha Alden	1984–93, 1995
Victor Bevine	Doug Donovan	1985–86
Pamela Blair	Rita Mae Bristow	1983–85
Mary Lynn Blanks	Jenny Baylor	1986–87
Walter Bobbie	Denny Anderson; Wally Anderson	1989–91
Julie Bowen	Steffy	1992
Pamela Bowen	Colby Cantrell	1984–85
Joseph Breen	Paul Slavinsky	1990–92
Lisa Brown	Carolyn Myers	1995
Peter Brown	Roger Forbes	1983–84
Philip Brown	Lyndon "Buck" Huston	1993–95
Elizabeth Burr	Noreen Vochek Donovan	1984–85
James Carroll	Leo Burnell	1992–94
Christopher Cass	Jack Forbes	1991–92
Thom Christopher	Dante Partou	1993–94
Jessica Collins	Dinah Lee Mayberry	1991–94
Linda Cook	Egypt Jones Masters	1988–91, 1993–94
Matthew Cowles	Eban Japes	1986–87
Richard Cox	Gifford Bowman	1991–92
Bryan Cranston	Doug Donovan	1983–85
Michael Cullen	John Rescott	1994
John Cunningham	Garth Slater	1983–84
Augusta Dabney	Isabelle Alden	1983–91, 1994–95
John Danelle	Lt. Art Hindman	1984, 1986–87
Ronnie Davidson	Hassan	1993–95
Peter Davies	Jim Vochek	1983–89
Leslie Denniston	Gwyneth Alden	1989
Colleen Dion	Cecilia Thompson Sowolsky	1986–88
Dan Doby	Judd Beecham	1985–86
Robert Dubaq	Alex Masters	1990–91
Shannon Eubanks	Ann Alden Forbes	1983–84
Geoffrey C. Ewing	Charles Harrison	1993–95
Scott Feraco	Jeff Hartman	1988
Kathleen Fisk	Kelly Conway	1986–87
Brian Fitzpatrick	Rick Alden	1990
Genie Francis	Ceara Connor	1991
Laura Frost	Zoe	1994
John Gabriel	Zack Conway	1986–87
Michael Galardi	Armand Rosario	1992–93
Rebecca Gayheart	Hannah Mayberry	1992–93
Jeff Gendelman	Nick Dinatos	1986–87
Isabel Glasser	Marty Edison	1987–88
Meta Golding	Brianna Hawkins	1995
Keith Grumet	Arthur Davis	1991–93
Larry Haines	Neil Warren	1994–95
Alice Haining	Cecilia Thompson Sowolsky	1985–86
Amelia Heinle	Steffi Brewster	1993–95
Britt Helfer	Lily Slater	1986–88
Anthony Herrera	Dane Hammond	1984–86, 1990–91
Catherine Hickland	Tess Wilder	1993–95
Hallee Hirsh	Heather Rose Forbes	1993–95
Judith Hoag	Lottie Bates Alden	1986–87
Celeste Holm	Isabelle Alden	1991–92
James Horan	Clay Alden	1989–91
Anders Hove	Cesar Faison	1993
Roger Howarth	Kent Winslow	1992
Patrick Johnson	Curtis Alden	1993
John R. Johnston	Steven Sowolsky	1984–87
Patricia Kalember	Merrill Vochek	1983–84
Teri Keane	Rose Donovan	1983–84, 1987–93
Susan Keith	Shana Sloane Burnell	1984–94
Ted King	Danny Roberts	1995
James Kiberd	Mike Donovan	1983–85
Alexander Kniffin	Michael Rescott	1991–92
Ilene Kristen	Norma Gilpin	1990–91
Jean LeClerc	Jeremy Hunter	1992–95
Jean LeClerc	Gilbert Nostrand	1994
Jonathan K. Lee	Ethan Washington	1985–86
Robert Leeshock	Randall "Monty" Montclair	1991
Noble Lee Lester	Andy Martel	1990–92
Tom Ligon	Billy Bristow	1983–85
Lisa LoCicero	Jocelyn Roberts	1995
Michael Lord	Curtis Alden	1993
Patty Lotz	Ava Rescott Masters	1984
Phil MacGregor	Linc Beecham	1985
Michael Maguire	Jeff Hartman	1988
Korey Mall	Tony Benedict	1985–86
Larkin Malloy	Clay Alden	1992
Randolph Mantooth	Clay Alden/Alex Masters	1987–90, 1993–95
Christopher Marcantel	Curtis Alden	1983–85, 1993–95
Marisol Massey	Abril Domecq Alden	1989–91
Kathleen McCall	Zona Beecham	1985–86
Todd McDurmont	Todd Jones	1988–89
Richard McGonagle	Clem Margolies	1984
Marilyn McIntyre	Noreen Vochek Donovan	1983–84
Richard McWilliams	Tony Perelli	1984–85
Roya Megnot	Ava Rescott Masters	1984–88, 1990
Elizabeth Mitchell	Dinah Lee Mayberry Alden	1994–95
Ed Moore	Harry Sowolsky	1984–88, 1994
Debbi Morgan	Carrie Mansfield; Angela Hubbard	1983; 1993–95
Burke Moses	Curtis Alden	1986–88
Meg Mundy	Isabelle Alden	1983
Elise Neal	Janey Sinclair	1994
Ron Nummi	Rick Alden	1987–89
John O'Hurley	Keith Lane; Jonathan Matalaine	1984–86
Nicole Orth-Pallavicini	Johanna Sachs	Late 1980s
Timothy Owen-Waldrip	Rob Carpenter	1986–87
Corey Page	Richard Wilkins	1995
George Palermo	Tony Soleito	1995
O'Hara Parker	Lorna Forbes Conway	1986–87
Dennis Parlato	Clay Alden	1992–95
Lisa Peluso	Ava Rescott Masters	1988–95
Luke Perry	Ned Bates	1987–88
Mark Pinter	Dan Hollister	1987–89
Teri Polo	Kristin Larsen	1987
Jane Powell	Rebecca Beecham	1985–86
Susan Pratt	Elizabeth Barnes	1994
Keith Pruitt	Flynn Reilly	1991–92
Cyd Quilling	Dolly Jones Lane	1985–86
Colleen Quinn	Carly Rescott Alden	1990–92, 1994
Sebastian Roche	Peter Rogers	1992
Nada Rowand	Kate Rescott Slavinsky	1984–95
Maggie Rush	Lorraine Hawkins	1995
Pamela Saunders	Lotty Bates Alden	1987
Elizabeth Savage	Gwyneth Alden	1989–91
John Schneider	Larry Lamont	1992
John Wesley Shipp	Carter Jones	1992
Rena Sofer	Rocky McKenzie Domecq	1988–91
Rebecca Staab	Cecilia Thompson Sowolsky	1985
Jessica Steen	Trisha Alden	1991
Richard Steinmetz	Jeff Hartman	1988–90, 1993–94
Perry Stephens	Jack Forbes	1983–90
Paul Anthony Stewart	Casey Bowman	1992–95
Dorothy Stinette	Rose Donovan	1984–87
Louise Stubbs	Minnie Madden	1988–91, 1994
Marianne Tatum	Gwyneth Alden	1989
Brian Robert Taylor	Lincoln "Linc" Beecham	1985–86
Lauren-Marie Taylor	Stacey Donovan Forbes	1983–95
Rick Telles	Rio Domecq	1990–91
Jeff Trachta	Hunter Beldon	1986
Christine L. Tudor	Gwyneth Alden	1984–89, 1991–95
Robert Tyler	Trucker McKenzie	1988–95
Susan Walters	Lorna Forbes Conway	1983–86
Michael Weatherly	Cooper Alden	1992–95
Callan White	Ann Alden Forbes	1984–88, 1990
Geoffrey Wigdor	J.J. Forbes	1993–95
Ann Williams	June Slater	1983–84
Darnell Williams	Jacob Foster	1995
Alexandra Wilson	April Hathaway	1987–88
Eric Woodall	Matthew Ford	1991–92
Laura Wright	Ally Rescott	1991–95
Neil Zevnik	Judd Beecham	1986
