= Eugene Kang =

American politician (born 1984)

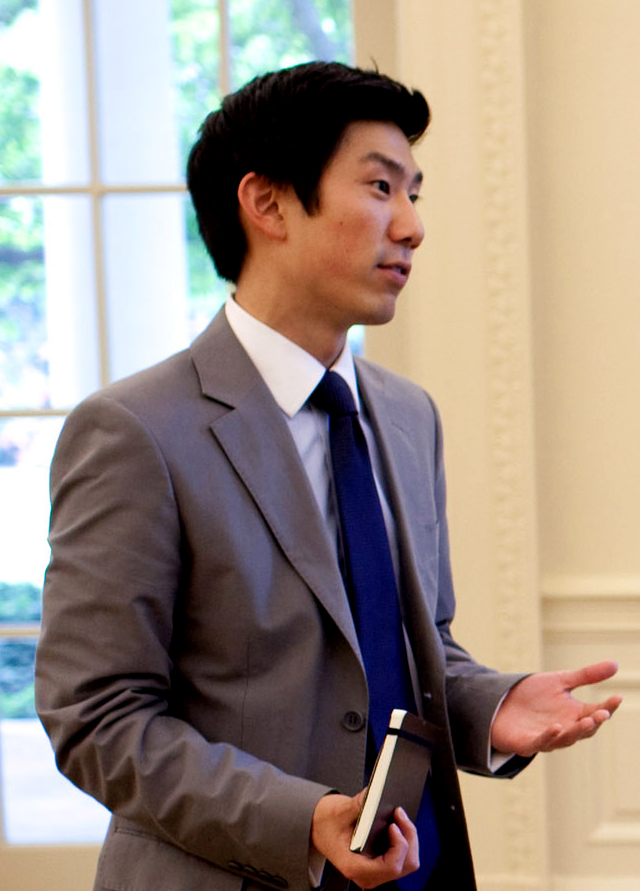

Special Projects Coordinator and Confidential Assistant to the President
- In office January 20, 2009 – January 20, 2017
- Appointed by: Barack Obama

Personal details
- Born: Ann Arbor, Michigan
- Party: Democratic
- Education: University of Michigan, Greenhills School

Eugene Kang (born 1984) was the Special Projects Coordinator and Confidential Assistant to President Barack Obama.

Eugene Kang is an Ann Arbor native who attended Greenhills School before enrolling at the University of Michigan. At Michigan, Kang made a 2005 bid for the Ann Arbor City Council. He later worked on Senator Amy Klobuchar's (D-Minn.) 2006 campaign. During Obama's Presidential campaign he worked in the political division. A second-generation Korean American, he was also a part of the Asian Americans and Pacific Islanders National Leadership Council.

Kang has been described as a "close confidant to President Obama" and has played eleven rounds of golf with the President from the time he took office through 2013.
