= WikiFeet =

Photo-sharing foot fetish website

wikiFeet
- Available in: English
- Founder: Eli Ozer
- Website: www.wikifeet.com
- Commercial: No
- Launched: 2008; 18 years ago
- Current status: Active

wikiFeet is a photo-sharing foot-fetish website dedicated to sharing photos of celebrities' feet. In 2016, it was described by Vice Media's Lauren Oyler as "...the most extensive online message board and photo gallery of women's feet on the Internet". (Note: WikiFeet Men is a counterpart to the site focusing on men's feet.) It mostly includes images of the feet of famous actors, actresses, singers, influencers, and other entertainers, though some politicians' and athletes' feet are also featured on the site. There is also a pornographic version of the site called WikiFeetX which posts the feet of pornographic actors.

It was founded in 2008 by Eli Ozer, an Israeli former computer programmer and animator who now runs the site full-time. According to Ozer, the site gets about 3 million views a month (as of July 2017).

In January 2019, wikiFeet was involved in debunking a hoax involving US congresswoman Alexandria Ocasio-Cortez; a picture of a woman's feet in a bathtub, purported to be a nude posted online by Ocasio-Cortez in 2016, was determined to be of someone else by users of the site, with the picture's short toe length being a key piece of evidence. They were determined to be the feet of Sydney Leathers, involved in the Anthony Weiner sexting scandals of 2013, which she confirmed to Washington Babylon in January 2019.

From June 2021 to early 2025, the website did not allow visitors from the European Union to browse full-resolution images because of a new EU Copyright Directive.
