= My Thoughts Exactly =

Memoir by Lily Allen

- Front cover
- Author: Lily Allen
- Audio read by: Lily Allen
- Language: English
- Subject: Memoir
- Publisher: Blink Publishing
- Publication date: 20 September 2018
- Publication place: United Kingdom
- Media type: Print; Audiobook
- Pages: 343
- ISBN: 978-1-911-60089-3

My Thoughts Exactly is a memoir by English singer-songwriter Lily Allen. The book was published on 20 September 2018, and several extracts from the book generated considerable press coverage prior to release. The book covers a variety of topics, such as "feminism, the tabloids, money, faking orgasms, bad managers, fame, sexual abuse, mental health, narcissism, co-dependency, festivals, motherhood, stalking and parking tickets". It received positive reviews.

== Background ==
Lily Allen is an English singer-songwriter. Born on 2 May 1985, to actor Keith Allen and film producer Alison Owen. Under EMI, Allen has released four albums: Alright, Still (2006), It's Not Me, It's You (2009), Sheezus (2014) and No Shame (2018).

Allen says that she wrote the book so her daughters will be able to understand her perspective on the events in her life, and to "set the record straight" following inaccuracies and misleading narratives by the British press. Allen wrote more chapters for the book that were not included, saying she could have "gone on and on and on". Her father did not read the memoir prior to its publication.

The book was announced in August 2018 and published by Blink Publishing on 20 September 2018, coincidentally the same day on which the 2018 Mercury Prize ceremony took place, in which No Shame was nominated. The book is a memoir presented in the form of thematic essays.

=== Press coverage ===
Several topics included in My Thoughts Exactly were revealed by news media prior to the book's release. These include Allen being sexually assaulted by a music industry executive, an intervention for Allen staged by Chris Martin, and an apology in the book to Cheryl, with whom Allen had a longstanding disagreement. Metro reports that Allen was unsurprised by the media response and "used to it".

On 2 September 2018, Allen posted on Instagram that she had paid for sex with female escorts in 2014 while on tour promoting Sheezus. Allen said that she made the Instagram post as the Daily Mail were planning to publish an article about it the following day. Allen criticised the press for portraying the events as a "lesbian prostitute sex romp".

On the day following the book's release, Alice Vincent of The Telegraph wrote an article entitled "Could Lily Allen's heartbreaking book spark music's MeToo moment?" Listing three incidents from the book in which Allen was taken advantage of by men in the music industry, Vincent writes that the book "could be a clarion call". Vincent notes that Allen wanted to name the record producer who sexually assaulted her, but the publisher's lawyers refused.

== Synopsis ==
Allen describes feeling neglected by her parents: her mother was addicted to drugs and her father was a narcissist who had affairs. Allen details the numerous schools she went to and describes a car accident involving her mother and brother which happened on the day she performed at a school concert. Aged 17 she met Lester, with whom she had an 18-month relationship. Allen overdosed on paracetamol following their breakup. She describes herself as codependent. During the same period, her father organised a deal with London Records and wrote songs for her with Pablo Cook. The label lost interest in her and after she sued to get out of the contract, they countersued unsuccessfully for £3.6 million. George Lamb started managing Allen, and she wrote music with Future Cut. Lamb stopped managing Allen, but she got a deal with Parlophone of £25,000 for five albums. With a growing Myspace fanbase, Allen was profiled in Observer Music Monthly and started working with Greg Kurstin. Writing about the pernicious nature of journalists and tabloids, Allen alleges that during her period of fame, her words were twisted and stories about her were constructed to fit misleading narratives. She describes a News of the World story leaked by Lester. In 2007, The Sun rang Allen's agent for confirmation that she was pregnant, but Allen did not realise she was pregnant until a week later. Announcing this publicly, she faked a miscarriage three weeks later.

Allen writes about many visits to the Glastonbury Festival. In 1998 at the festival, her father had a heart attack and took cocaine immediately after being discharged. (Note: Keith Allen disputes Allen's claims about the heart attack being drug-induced, saying that he had acute food poisoning.) Allen writes about hosting the GQ Awards with Elton John, and a wrongful headline about the two falling out which followed. She says her three Ivor Novello Awards are the only awards she values, as other music awards are influenced by politics between record labels. Allen describes her first two sexual encounters at the age of fourteen, with men who were several years older. She describes a sexual encounter with Liam Gallagher, realising the next day that he was married to Nicole Appleton. Allen details her youthful lack of financial awareness which led her to accumulate a plethora of parking tickets. Allen began dating Sam Cooper in 2009, having known him for several years. They bought a countryside house once Allen was pregnant with a child they named George. However, she suffered a miscarriage seven months into her pregnancy, and then had sepsis. Soon after, Cooper proposed and they married in June 2011. Their daughter Ethel was born in November 2011 but her laryngomalacia meant she had to feed from a tube for the first eight months. Their second daughter Marnie was born in January 2013.

Allen struggled writing Sheezus as the label did not want her to discuss her motherhood and continued to sexualise her. Allen developed bulimia and used cocaine and other appetite suppressants to decrease her eating. Allen became overweight when pregnant with Marnie, but after giving birth she quickly lost the weight with alcohol and drugs. Meanwhile, a backlash to perceived racism in the music video to "Hard Out Here" led Allen to learn more about intersectional feminism. As Allen began touring for Sheezus, she felt isolation due to a recent falling out with her mother, her ex-booking agent suing her, her manager resigning, and the touring band members—The Streets—ignoring her comments about the production and eventually resigning. On the tour, Allen bought vibrators and discovered how to make herself orgasm. She also had affairs with men and hired female prostitutes, which continued as Allen supported Miley Cyrus on her Bangerz tour. Allen's use of pharmaceutical drugs and alcohol became very dangerous. After accidentally headbutting Orlando Bloom at a party, Chris Martin spoke to Allen and she decided to return to London, where she accidentally overdosed. Following an unhelpful conversation with her father, Allen spoke to Cooper in mid-2015 and the pair separated.

In 2016, Allen was sexually assaulted by a record industry executive. She had been drinking following six months of sobriety, and awoke at 5 a.m. to find the executive slapping her buttocks and trying to put his penis into her vagina. She discusses the prevalence of abuse in the music industry, which went unaddressed during the #MeToo movement. Allen talks about her stalker, Alex Gray, who broke into her house in 2015. She slowly connected Gray to the man who had sent her threatening messages online since 2008, once appeared at a concert of hers holding a banner claiming to have written "The Fear", stole her mail in 2009 and sent her a series of letters. Allen hired a lawyer and paid £40,000 in legal fees to get the case treated seriously; the police had destroyed Gray's letters, claimed the incident was a burglary and refused to keep Allen updated on the case's progress. Gray was eventually convicted and sent to a mental institution. Allen talks about how her wealth and privilege allowed her to pursue the case, and voices concerns about how less powerful victims of stalking fare in the legal process. In late 2016, Allen had a psychotic episode and had to take prescription drugs for two months. In the final few chapters, Allen writes about her recovery. She talks about sobriety, her outspokenness on social media, the composition of No Shame and ends on the line "I've got my voice back."

== Reception ==
Anita Singh of The Daily Telegraph gives the book four out of five stars. In a positive review, Jude Rogers of New Statesman lauds the book as "uniquely candid" and praises the depth to which it explores "the darkness of being a very famous woman". Rogers notes that the "sharpness of the prose" caused her to cry while reading one chapter. Katie Glass writes in The Times that one "can't read this book and not feel sorry for Allen". Glass praises Allen as "admirably open" about the provenance of the story and describes Allen's description of the downside of fame as "honest". She also says that Allen "rarely recognises her privileges", "skims over the fun" and "seems to suffer severe imposter syndrome". Miles Salter of The Press praised Allen for showing "tremendous authenticity about her own failings". Salter lauded the book for its "coruscating honesty" but criticised that cultural and political events go relatively unmentioned.

Fiona Sturges of The Guardian reviews that the book makes for "compelling but discomfiting reading" as "no detail is deemed too personal". Sturges describes the memoir as "visceral and affecting" and praises the "lucid and heartfelt account" of Allen's treatment by the press while criticising that her "characteristic self-awareness deserts her" when discussing her privilege. Hannah Jane Parkinson of The Observer describes the book as "uneven". Parkinson praises Allen's commentary relating to the music industry and writes that her thoughts are "very honest" and "funny", calling Allen "smart and tenacious". However, Parkinson criticises the chapters relating to Allen's father and her inconsistency in acknowledging her privilege. Nicole Flattery of The Irish Times writes that the book is "commendable for its frankness" and praises Allen's resilience, particularly following her stillbirth, and her description of being "treated as a sex object". Flattery opines that the book's best parts "felt like spending time with a ridiculous, outrageous friend" while the worst "was like being left stranded with a girl you just met at the campsite on the last day of a festival".

In 2018, My Thoughts Exactly was nominated for the FutureBook Campaign of the Year. The book is one of seven chosen by the Evening Standard as the "best celebrity memoirs of 2018". It is one of nine books listed under the "Showbusiness" category of The Guardian's best books of 2018.
