= It's Not Me, It's You =

2009 studio album by Lily Allen

- Standard edition cover (Note: The special edition cover features Lily Allen's name in giant letters and Allen sitting in the first letter "L", with the title of album below.)

Studio album by Lily Allen
- Released: 4 February 2009
- Recorded: 2007–2008
- Studios: Home studio (Moreton-in-Marsh); The Premises, Olympic (London); Lypiatt Park (Gloucestershire); Kingsize Soundlabs (Los Angeles)
- Genres: Pop; electropop; R&B
- Length: 43:28
- Labels: Regal; Parlophone
- Producers: Greg Kurstin; Morgan Nicholls

Lily Allen chronology
Alright, Still (2006)	It's Not Me, It's You (2009)	F.U.E.P. (2009)

Singles from It's Not Me, It's You
- 1. "The Fear" Released: 9 December 2008; 2. "Not Fair" Released: 20 March 2009; 3. "Fuck You" Released: 10 July 2009; 4. "22" Released: 24 August 2009; 5. "Who'd Have Known" Released: 30 November 2009

It's Not Me, It's You is the second studio album by English singer Lily Allen, released on 4 February 2009 by Regal Recordings and Parlophone. It was produced and co-written by Greg Kurstin, with whom Allen had previously worked on her debut studio album, Alright, Still (2006). The album represents a departure from the ska and reggae influences of its predecessor, incorporating electropop with elements of jazz.

Upon release, It's Not Me, It's You received positive reviews from critics, praising Allen's "sharp tongue" and calling the album "wonderful". The album was a commercial success, debuting at number one on the charts in the United Kingdom, Australia and Canada. It was later certified triple platinum by the British Phonographic Industry (BPI) and has sold 1,070,340 copies in the UK alone. It was also certified four times platinum by the Australian Recording Industry Association (ARIA) for shipments of over 280,000 copies in Australia. The album has sold over two million copies worldwide.

The album's lead single, "The Fear", also debuted atop the UK Singles Chart, where it remained for four consecutive weeks. Other singles include the UK top-five entry "Not Fair", "Fuck You", "22" and "Who'd Have Known". The track "Back to the Start" was released as a limited-edition seven-inch vinyl for Record Store Day. Allen performed on a variety of television programs to promote the album, including Jimmy Kimmel Live! and The Ellen DeGeneres Show. She also embarked on her second concert tour, the It's Not Me, It's You World Tour, which visited Europe, North America, Asia, Oceania and South America.

== Background ==
Allen became well known through her Myspace account, on which she started posting demo songs in 2005. The increase of popularity led to a contract with Regal Recordings. Her debut single, "Smile", was released in 2006 and topped the UK Singles Chart for two weeks. Allen's debut studio album, Alright, Still (2006), was released shortly after. The album was commercially successful, earning a triple platinum certification by the British Phonographic Industry (BPI) and a gold certification by the Recording Industry Association of America (RIAA). The album was nominated for Best Alternative Music Album at the 50th Grammy Awards. The follow-up singles "LDN", "Littlest Things" and "Alfie" performed moderately on the charts, with "LDN" peaking at number six on the UK Singles Chart.

After the release of Alright, Still, Allen's parent record company, EMI, was taken over by Terra Firma. She also changed her management company from Empire Artist Management to Twenty-First Artists, although her core team remained in place. At the urging of her record company, Allen tried unsuccessfully to create the album with several writers and producers. Allen eventually returned to Greg Kurstin, who had written three songs for Alright, Still.

== Recording ==
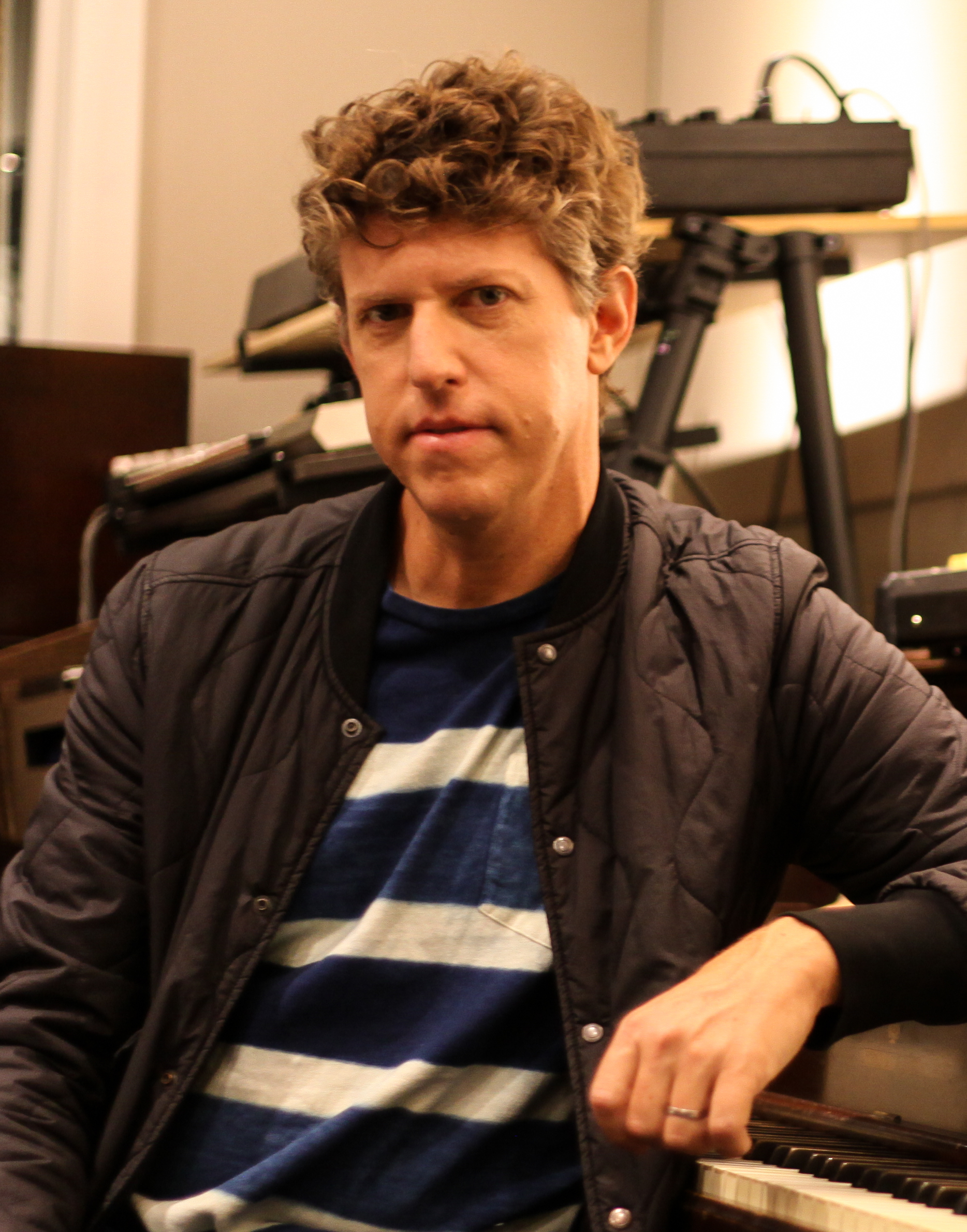
Kurstin produced and co-wrote the album with Allen

In April 2008, Allen announced that she would be moving in a "new direction" for her then-upcoming record. That same month, she posted two demo tracks on her Myspace page and planned to release a mixtape to give her fans an idea of what the new direction was. A year later, she described the album's sound in the April 2009 issue of Teen Vogue, saying it was "quite fun" and had "loads of different types of music—country, jazz, and electronic." She continued on to say, "I wanted to do something danceable, to make the gigs more interesting for me and the people watching." Allen released a statement saying, "We decided to try and make bigger sounding, more ethereal songs, real songs [...] I wanted to work with one person from start to finish to make it one body of work. I wanted it to feel like it had some sort of integrity. I think I've grown up a bit as a person and I hope it reflects that."

Allen recorded most of the album at Eagle Rock Studios in Los Angeles with producer Greg Kurstin of the band The Bird and the Bee. Of the songwriting process, she said, "Greg builds the chords up and I just sing along and make up the words and then once you've got the bare song, we decide which way we're gonna go with the production." Allen co-wrote the songs for the album with Kurstin, who played piano on it. This is a change from her earlier work in which she wrote lyrics for finished tracks. In May 2008, Allen told The Sunday Mirror that the album was nearly finished. Allen said of the album: "I've worked so hard. My next album is nearly finished. I'm on a two-week break and then I'm starting a massive promotional tour." In August 2008, Allen blamed the delay in the album's release on her record company EMI. On 15 September, it was announced via her Myspace blog that the album would be released on 9 February 2009.

== Release ==
In July 2008, the working title of the album was confirmed as Stuck on the Naughty Step. On 7 October at the BMI Awards, Allen announced that the album title had been changed to It's Not Me, It's You because she "lived with [the original title] for too long" and got bored of it. On 29 October, Allen announced the album would be released in the United States on 10 February 2009. The track listings were also released. She described the sound as bigger and more ethereal sound. She noted she has grown as a person and feels the album will have some sort of integrity. Allen posted several demos on her Myspace page before the album's release. The first two to appear were "I Could Say" and "I Don't Know" in April 2008, the latter of which was retitled and released as the album's lead single, "The Fear". Based on the first two demos, Digital Spy described her new artistic direction as more mature, reflective, and electronic.

A third, politically charged clip was later posted in June 2008, with the titles "Guess Who Batman" and later "Get with the Brogram", finally appearing as "GWB". Despite both working titles sharing initials with George W. Bush, Allen wrote that "this song is not a direct attack at anyone, it was originally written about the BNP in the UK but then I felt this issue has become relevant pretty much everywhere, we are the youth, we can make coolness for our future, its up to us. Go green and hate hate." The song was retitled "Fuck You" for the album version. Allen posted a fourth song on her Myspace page, called "Who'd of Known", noting that the song had been recorded for the album but would not be included due to legal issues since the chorus is musically similar to the Take That song "Shine". However, Take That later did allow Allen to include the song on the album (now titled grammatically correctly as "Who'd Have Known"). In October 2008, Allen posted another song titled "Everyone's At It" which was later announced as the album's lead single however, "The Fear" was chosen instead.

== Promotion ==
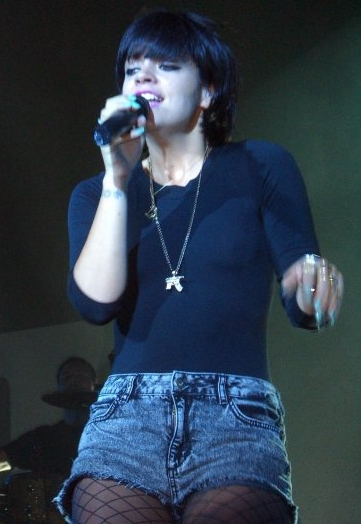
Allen performing in Paris in May 2009

Allen promoted the album worldwide. While being invited to Scott Mills' BBC Radio 1 show, Allen talked about her struggles with the paparazzi and also premiered "The Fear" by performing it live. Other live performances of the song include the Sound on BBC 2 with Nick Grimshaw and Annie Mac, Friday Night with Jonathan Ross, the Orange unsignedAct and The Sunday Night Project. In February 2009, she was invited at The Today Show with Matt Lauer, where she performed the song after an interview. The same month, she made an appearance on The Ellen DeGeneres Show, and while she was singing, DeGeneres freely dispensed copies of It's Not Me, It's You to the audience. Afterwards, both Allen and DeGeneres performed a rendition of Britney Spears's "Womanizer". Allen included the song on the setlist of her It's Not Me, It's You World Tour, as part of the encore. "The Fear" was also performed at the 2010 Brit Awards as the opening song. Allen arrived on stage wearing a black corset dress and sitting on a rocket hoisted in the air. She was later joined on stage by paratroopers dressed in pink military camouflage and women with Silver Cross prams. She performed "The Fear" and "Fuck You" in France on Le Grand Journal de Canal+ and sang "The Fear" on NRJ Radio.

Allen performed "The Fear" and "Not Fair" at Sessions@AOL. She also went to Australia to promote the album, where she appeared on the talk show Rove Live where she performed "The Fear", "Not Fair", and "22", and Triple J radio station where she performed "The Fear", "Not Fair" and "He Wasn't There". She also performed "The Fear" on So You Think You Can Dance Australia. She performed "The Fear" on the Japanese show Music Station. She performed "Not Fair" on the UK TV show T4 and was interviewed about the album on The One Show. Allen performed songs off the album and old hits on Radio 1's Big Weekend and at the London nightclub G-A-Y. To further promote the album, Allen embarked on the It's Not Me, It's You World Tour (2009–2010).

== Singles ==
Allen stated on her official website that "The Fear" had been chosen as the lead single. The song had its radio premiere via on The Scott Mills Show on 1 December 2008. The song's official music video premiered on 4 December at Channel 4, but it was leaked before the official release date and uploaded on YouTube two hours before the official premiere. The song was officially released on 8 December 2008, topping the UK Singles Chart for four consecutive weeks and becoming Allen's second number-one single in the UK.

"Not Fair" was released digitally on 20 March 2009 and as a CD single on 16 May. "Not Fair" was played by DJ Ken Bruce on BBC Radio 2 days before the release of the album and was heavily edited to 2:04, removing the line "Oh I lie here in the wet patch in the middle of the bed, I'm feeling pretty damn hard done by, I've spent ages giving head". The single reached number five on the UK Singles Chart.

"Fuck You" was released as the album's third single on 19 May 2009. "Fuck You" was released on the Australian iTunes store on 22 April, available as a censored version different from that which appeared on "The Fear" EP and the normal album version. The track peaked at number nine on the Czech Airplay Chart in late December 2008, under the demo name "Guess Who Batman". The song also received much airplay on Australian radio stations Nova and Triple J, and charted at number 90 on the 2008 Triple J Hottest 100 countdown. It eventually reached number 23 on the ARIA Singles Chart. "Fuck You" also became Allen's third chart entry on the Billboard Hot 100 in the United States, peaking at number 68.

"22" was released as the album's fourth official single on 14 July 2009. On 31 May, Allen stated on her Twitter page that "22" would be her next single after revealing that the music video would be shot the next day. The video was released on 11 July 2009.

"Who'd Have Known" was released on 23 November 2009 as the fifth and final official single (fourth in the United Kingdom) from the album. In the US, it was released on 13 November 2009.

=== Other songs ===
"Back to the Start" was released on seven-inch vinyl exclusively for Record Store Day on 17 April 2010, in a limited run of 1,000 copies. The song was serviced to radio in Australia in late 2009, reaching number 21 on the Australian Airplay Chart in early 2010.

== Critical reception ==
Professional ratings
Aggregate scores
Source	Rating
AnyDecentMusic?	6.6/10
Metacritic	71/100
Review scores
Source	Rating
AllMusic	4/5 stars
The A.V. Club	B
Entertainment Weekly	B+
The Guardian	4/5 stars
Los Angeles Times	3/4 stars
MSN Music (Consumer Guide)	A
NME	8/10
Pitchfork	6.6/10
Rolling Stone	3/5 stars
Spin	3.5/5 stars

It's Not Me, It's You received generally positive reviews from music critics. At Metacritic, which assigns a normalised rating out of 100 to reviews from mainstream publications, the album received an average score of 71, based on 32 reviews. Reviewing for The Observer, Garry Mulholland awarded the album five out of five, calling this a "wonderful record," and added that it is "a pop album brave enough to have a go at defining the times." James Skinner of Drowned in Sound echoed these sentiments, stating that "when Lily Allen is at the top of her game, she is the (im)perfect pop star for our times" in a generally positive review. Clash concluded, "Britain's mouthy pop idol returns triumphantly and with the brawny guts to stick with what she knows best", after commenting that Allen "probably has enough personal ammunition to fuel a ten-year career of brutally autobiographical albums". Mikael Wood of Billboard stated the album is "hardly the grown-up buzz-kill it might have been", thanks to "Allen's still-sharp lyrical wit and an exceedingly crafty production job by Greg Kurstin." Wood also praised in particular the track "Him", calling it an "irresistible tune".

Neil McCormick of The Daily Telegraph praised Allen's more personal songs on the album: "It is when she turns her sharp tongue to her own affairs of the heart that Allen's growing adventurousness and lyrical confidence really pay off...But in particular 'Who'd Have Known' is a tender evocation of friendship turning to love, in which the detail is telling and Allen's vocal performance positively glows with easy affection. On such songs, Allen still sounds like a real person telling us the most intimate details of her real life, only with better hooks." McCormick also praised the lead single as "superb" and "an ironic declaration of celebrity superficiality set to a pulsing, sleekly modern electro dance backing."

In a mixed review, Charles A. Hohman of PopMatters stated "when she's infuriating, especially when she's infuriating, she's an enthralling performer, her personality taking her where her limited vocals cannot." He also commented, "Too often, she's treading water on songs that play like Alright outtakes, and when she tries to expand, she stumbles." However, praise was given to the lyrics and melodies, with Hohman stating, "Yet she is more comedienne than philosopher, better at taking the piss than making a point." Allison Franks of Consequence of Sound wrote, "Known for her upbeat melodies and rhymes, which are often comical, introspective and set to bouncy back beats, Allen decided to try something a little fresh on her next effort."

=== Retrospective reviews ===
The album has also received retrospective reviews from critics in the years following its original release. These later assessments have continued to praise the album's songwriting, production, and Lily Allen's distinctive pop sound.

Source	Rating
DIY	4/5 stars
WKNC	9.5/10

== Commercial performance ==
It's Not Me, It's You debuted at number one on the UK Albums Chart, selling 112,568 copies in its first week of release. It was certified quadruple platinum by the British Phonographic Industry (BPI) on 24 November 2023, and as of October 2025, it had sold 1,242,106 copies in the United Kingdom. In the United States, the album debuted at number five on the Billboard 200 with first-week sales of 70,000 copies. As of November 2013, the album had sold 353,000 copies in the US. It debuted at number one on the Canadian Albums Chart with 8,500 units sold in its first week. It was certified gold by the Canadian Recording Industry Association (CRIA) on 18 February 2010 for sales of 40,000 units.

In Australia, It's Not Me, It's You entered the ARIA Albums Chart at number one and spent three non-consecutive weeks atop the chart. The Australian Recording Industry Association (ARIA) certified the album four times platinum for shipments of over 280,000 copies. The album debuted at number 11 on the French Albums Chart with sales of 5,953 copies. By December 2009, It's Not Me, It's You had sold over two million copies worldwide.

== Track listing ==
All tracks are written by Lily Allen and Greg Kurstin, except where noted. All tracks produced by Kurstin, except where noted.

No.	Title	Writer(s)	Length
1.	"Everyone's at It"		4:38
2.	"The Fear"		3:27
3.	"Not Fair"		3:21
4.	"22"		3:06
5.	"I Could Say"		4:04
6.	"Back to the Start"		4:14
7.	"Never Gonna Happen"		3:27
8.	"Fuck You"		3:43
9.	"Who'd Have Known"	Gary Barlow; Jason Orange; Mark Owen; Howard Donald; Steve Robson; Allen; Kurstin	3:50
10.	"Chinese"		3:28
11.	"Him"		3:18
12.	"He Wasn't There"		2:52 (Note: "He Wasn't There" has a length of 2:16 in some versions of the album.)

Japanese edition bonus tracks
No.	Title	Length
13.	"Kabul Shit"	3:45
14.	"Fag Hag"	2:55
15.	"The Fear" (video)	3:47

French edition bonus track
No.	Title	Writer(s)	Length
13.	"22 (Vingt Deux)" (featuring Ours)	Allen; Kurstin; Ours	3:09

Special edition bonus tracks
No.	Title	Writer(s)	Producer(s)	Length
13.	"The Fear" (acoustic)		Morgan Nicholls	3:28
14.	"22" (acoustic)		Nicholls	3:08
15.	"Who'd Have Known" (acoustic)	Barlow; Orange; Owen; Donald; Robson; Allen; Kurstin	Nicholls	3:58
16.	"He Wasn't There" (acoustic)		Nicholls	2:57
17.	"I Could Say" (acoustic)		Nicholls	3:57
18.	"Womanizer" (acoustic)	Rafael Akinyemi; Nikesha Briscoe		3:33
19.	"Mr Blue Sky"	Jeff Lynne		3:42
20.	"The Count (a.k.a. Hervé) and Lily Face the Fear"		Kurstin; Hervé	4:21
21.	"Not Fair" (Style of Eye remix)		Kurstin; Linus Eklöw	6:18

Special edition bonus DVD
No.	Title	Length
1.	"Everyone's at It" (live in London)
2.	"LDN"/"Dance wiv Me" (live in London)
3.	"Not Fair" (live in London)
4.	"Him" (live in London)
5.	"He Wasn't There" (live in London)
6.	"Littlest Things" (live in London)
7.	"Smile" (live in London)
8.	"The Fear" (live in London)
9.	"It's Not Me, It's You" (track-by-track interview)
10.	"The Fear" (promo video)
11.	"Not Fair" (promo video)
12.	"22" (promo video)
13.	"Fuck You" (promo video)

Sample credit

- "Who'd Have Known" interpolates a portion of "Shine" by Take That.

== Personnel ==
Credits adapted from the liner notes of It's Not Me, It's You.

- Lily Allen – vocals (all tracks); glockenspiel (track 6)
- Greg Kurstin – production, recording, keyboards, guitars, bass, programming (all tracks); mixing (tracks 2–6, 8–12)
- Mark "Spike" Stent – mixing (tracks 1, 7)
- Matty Green – mixing assistance (track 1)
- Joel Avenden – additional engineering (track 7)
- Geoff Pesche – mastering
- Serge Leblon – photography
- Alex Cowper – art direction, design
- Dan Sanders – art direction, commissioning
- Andy Hillman – set design

== Charts ==
=== Weekly charts ===
Weekly chart performance for It's Not Me, It's You
Chart (2009)	Peak position
Australian Albums (ARIA)	1
Austrian Albums (Ö3 Austria)	21
Belgian Albums (Ultratop Flanders)	5
Belgian Albums (Ultratop Wallonia)	22
Canadian Albums (Billboard)	1
Croatian Albums (HDU)	19
Czech Albums (ČNS IFPI)	11
Dutch Albums (Album Top 100)	17
European Albums (Billboard)	2
Finnish Albums (Suomen virallinen lista)	11
French Albums (SNEP)	11
German Albums (Offizielle Top 100)	17
Irish Albums (IRMA)	3
Italian Albums (FIMI)	41
Japanese Albums (Oricon)	27
Mexican Albums (Top 100 Mexico)	50
New Zealand Albums (RMNZ)	9
Norwegian Albums (VG-lista)	26
Polish Albums (ZPAV)	35
Scottish Albums (Official Charts)	1
Spanish Albums (Promusicae)	93
Swedish Albums (Sverigetopplistan)	14
Swiss Albums (Schweizer Hitparade)	6
UK Albums (Official Charts)	1
US Billboard 200	5

Chart (2024)	Peak position
Hungarian Physical Albums (MAHASZ)	20

Chart (2026)	Peak position
Croatian International Albums (HDU)	9

=== Monthly charts ===
Monthly chart performance
Chart (2026)	Position
Croatian International Vinyl Albums (HDU)	9

=== Year-end charts ===
2009 year-end chart performance for It's Not Me, It's You
Chart (2009)	Position
Australian Albums (ARIA)	5
Belgian Albums (Ultratop Flanders)	30
Belgian Albums (Ultratop Wallonia)	71
Dutch Albums (Album Top 100)	57
European Albums (Billboard)	17
French Albums (SNEP)	66
German Albums (Offizielle Top 100)	89
Irish Albums (IRMA)	20
New Zealand Albums (RMNZ)	33
Swiss Albums (Schweizer Hitparade)	50
UK Albums (OCC)	9
US Billboard 200	148

2010 year-end chart performance for It's Not Me, It's You
Chart (2010)	Position
Australian Albums (ARIA)	46
French Albums (SNEP)	152
UK Albums (OCC)	74

=== Decade-end charts ===
Decade-end chart performance for It's Not Me, It's You
Chart (2000–2009)	Position
Australian Albums (ARIA)	100

== Certifications and sales ==
Certifications and sales for It's Not Me, It's You
Region	Certification	Certified units/sales
Australia (ARIA)	4× Platinum	280,000^{^}
Belgium (BRMA)	Platinum	30,000^{*}
Canada (Music Canada)	Gold	40,000^{^}
France (SNEP)	Platinum	100,000^{*}
Ireland (IRMA)	2× Platinum	30,000^{^}
New Zealand (RMNZ)	Platinum	15,000^{^}
Switzerland (IFPI Switzerland)	Gold	15,000^{^}
United Kingdom (BPI)	4× Platinum	1,242,106
United States	—	353,000
Summaries
Europe (IFPI)	Platinum	1,000,000^{*}
^{*} Sales figures based on certification alone.^{^} Shipments figures based on certification alone.

== Release history ==
Release history for It's Not Me, It's You
Region	Date	Label	Ref.
Japan	4 February 2009	EMI	
Australia	6 February 2009	EMI	
Germany	6 February 2009	EMI	
Italy	6 February 2009	EMI	
Ireland	6 February 2009	Regal; Parlophone	
United Kingdom	9 February 2009	Regal; Parlophone	
France	9 February 2009	EMI	
Canada	10 February 2009	EMI	
United States	10 February 2009	Capitol	
Sweden	11 February 2009	EMI	

== See also ==
- List of UK Albums Chart number ones of the 2000s
- List of number-one albums of 2009 (Australia)
- List of number-one albums of 2009 (Canada)
