= Paris Live Session =

EP by Lily Allen
- Released: 24 November 2009
- Recorded: 2008–2009
- Genre: Pop; jazz; R&B
- Length: 19:13
- Label: Regal

Lily Allen chronology
| F.U.E.P. (2009) | Paris Live Session (2009) | Sheezus (2014) |

Paris Live Session is an iTunes-only extended play by British singer Lily Allen released on 24 November 2009 by Regal Recordings.

== Track list ==
| No. | Title | Writer(s) | Length |
|---|---|---|---|
| 1. | "Fuck You" | Lily Allen; Greg Kurstin | 3:53 |
| 2. | "22 (Vingt Deux)" (featuring Ours) | Allen; Kurstin; Ours | 3:58 |
| 3. | "The Fear" | Allen; Kurstin | 3:17 |
| 4. | "Littlest Things" | Allen; Herve Roy; Mark Ronson; Pierre Bachelet; Santi White | 3:32 |
| 5. | "Everyone's at It" | Allen; Kurstin | 4:33 |
