= It's Not Me, It's You World Tour =

2009–10 concert tour by Lily Allen

- Tour by Lily Allen
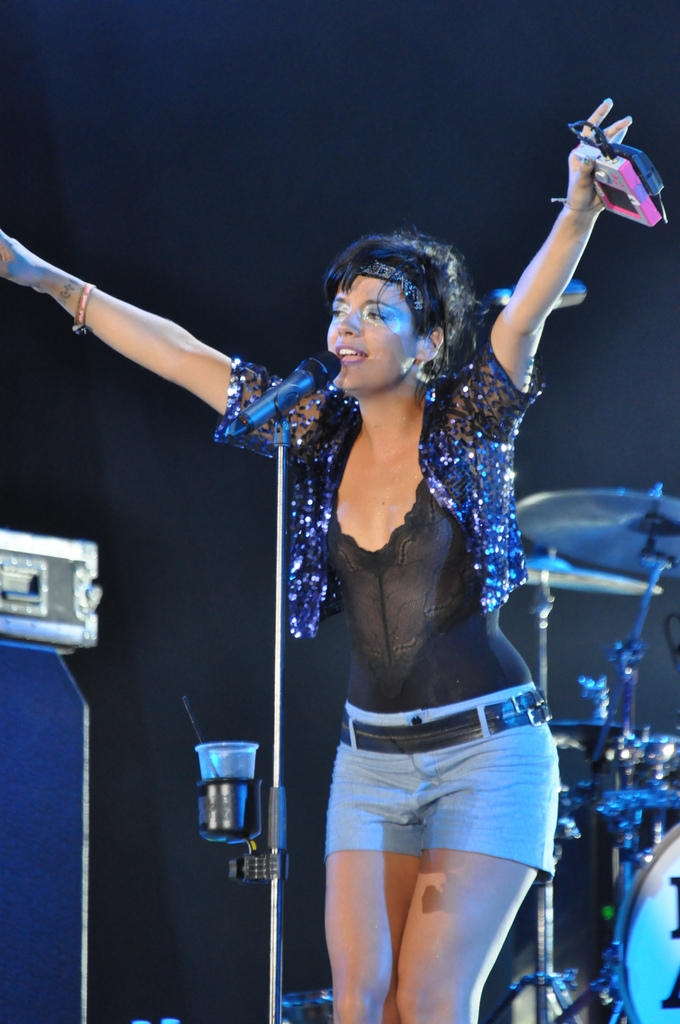
- Allen performing in August 2009, during the tour
- Associated album: It's Not Me, It's You
- Start date: 14 March 2009
- End date: 10 September 2010
- Legs: 6
- No. of shows: 67 in Europe; 15 in North America; 14 in Australia; 3 in Asia; 3 in South America; 1 in New Zealand; 103 in total

Lily Allen concert chronology
- Still, Alright? (2006–07); It's Not Me, It's You World Tour (2009–10); Sheezus Tour (2014–15)

The It's Not Me, It's You World Tour is the second concert tour by English singer-songwriter Lily Allen in support her second studio album, It's Not Me, It's You. The tour visited Europe, North America, Asia, Oceania and South America.

== Opening acts ==
- Example (United Kingdom & Ireland – November/December)
- La Roux (United Kingdom – March)
- Natalie Portman's Shaved Head (North America)
- Cassette Kids (Australia)
- Just Jack (11 July and 22 October only)
- Dizzee Rascal – Australia (Brisbane only)
- Calvin Harris – Australia (Brisbane only)
- The Big Pink – London (10 September only)
- White Rabbits – London (10 September only)
- Professor Green – Australia (2010 Dates only)

== Setlist ==
Main
1. "Everyone's at It"
2. "I Could Say"
3. "Never Gonna Happen"
4. "Oh My God" / "Everything's Just Wonderful"
5. "Him"
6. "Who'd Have Known"
7. "LDN"/"Dance wiv Me"
8. "Back to the Start"
9. "He Wasn't There"
10. "Littlest Things"
11. "Chinese"
12. "22"
13. "Not Fair"
14. "Fuck You"

Encore

16. "Smile"
17. "The Fear"
18. "Womanizer" (Britney Spears cover)
Festival
1. "Everyone's at It"
2. "I Could Say"
3. "Oh My God"
4. "LDN"
5. "Back to the Start"
6. "Littlest Things"
7. "Smile"
8. "The Fear"
9. "Womanizer" (Britney Spears cover)
10. "Fuck You"
11. "Not Fair"

=== Notes ===
- "Dance wiv Me" was not performed in the United States.
- In Ireland "Not Fair" was not performed in its normal position, it was the last song.
- While performing "Womanizer" at the Los Angeles show, Lindsay Lohan joined Allen onstage for a brief moment.
- Calvin Harris and Dizzee Rascal both performed at the Brisbane show on 19 January 2010.
- "Why" was performed in São Paulo, right after "I Could Say" in the setlist.
- "Knock 'Em Out" was performed in London on late 2009.
- In concert at São Paulo, "Fuck You" and "Not Fair" were moved to the Encore and "Smile", "The Fear" and "Womanizer" left the encore.

== Tour dates ==
Date	City	Country	Venue
Europe
14 March 2009	Glasgow	Scotland	O_{2} Academy
15 March 2009	Manchester	England	Manchester Academy
16 March 2009	Dublin	Ireland	The Academy
18 March 2009	Bristol	England	O_{2} Academy
19 March 2009	Southampton	England	Southampton Guildhall
20 March 2009	Brighton	England	Brighton Dome
22 March 2009	Norwich	England	University of East Anglia
23 March 2009	Birmingham	England	O_{2} Academy
24 March 2009	Leeds	England	O_{2} Academy
26 March 2009	London	England	O_{2} Shepherd's Bush Empire
27 March 2009	London	England	O_{2} Shepherd's Bush Empire
28 March 2009	London	England	O_{2} Shepherd's Bush Empire
North America
1 April 2009	San Diego	United States	House of Blues
2 April 2009	Los Angeles	United States	Pellissier Building and Wiltern Theatre
4 April 2009	San Francisco	United States	The Warfield
6 April 2009	Seattle	United States	The Showbox SODO
8 April 2009	Salt Lake City	United States	The Venue
9 April 2009	Denver	United States	Ogden Theatre
11 April 2009	Minneapolis	United States	First Avenue
12 April 2009	Chicago	United States	Riviera Theatre
13 April 2009	Detroit	United States	Saint Andrew's Hall
15 April 2009	Atlanta	United States	Variety Playhouse
17 April 2009	Washington, D.C.	United States	9:30 Club
18 April 2009	Philadelphia	United States	The TLA
19 April 2009	Boston	United States	House of Blues
20 April 2009	New York City	United States	Roseland Ballroom
22 April 2009	Toronto	Canada	The Sound Academy
Europe
3 May 2009	Berlin	Germany	Postbahnhof
4 May 2009	Cologne	Germany	E-Werk
6 May 2009	Paris	France	La Cigale
7 May 2009	Amsterdam	Netherlands	Melkweg
8 May 2009	Brussels	Belgium	Ancienne Belgique
Asia
4 June 2009	Osaka	Japan	Big Cat
5 June 2009	Tokyo	Japan	O-East Shibuya
2 September 2009	Ho Chi Minh City	Vietnam	Unknown
Australia
8 June 2009	Brisbane	Australia	Tivoli
9 June 2009	Sydney	Australia	Hordern Pavilion
10 June 2009	Sydney	Australia	Hordern Pavilion
12 June 2009	Melbourne	Australia	The Forum
13 June 2009	Melbourne	Australia	The Forum
Europe
19 June 2009	Tuttlingen	Germany	Southside Festival
20 June 2009	Scheeßel	Germany	Hurricane Festival
21 June 2009	Luxembourg	Luxembourg	Den Atelier
24 June 2009	Zagreb	Croatia	T-Mobile INmusic festival
26 June 2009	Pilton	England	Glastonbury Festival
2 July 2009	Werchter	Belgium	Rock Werchter
3 July 2009	Arras	France	Main Square Festival
4 July 2009	Roskilde	Denmark	Roskilde Festival
5 July 2009	Gdynia	Poland	Open'er Festival
7 July 2009	Montreux	Switzerland	Montreux Jazz Festival
9 July 2009	Novi Sad	Serbia	Exit
10 July 2009	Punchestown Racecourse	Ireland	Oxegen
11 July 2009	London	England	Somerset House
12 July 2009	Balado	Scotland	T in the Park
18 July 2009	Benicàssim	Spain	Festival Internacional de Benicàssim
8 August 2009	Monte Carlo	Monaco	Sporting Monte-Carlo
9 August 2009	Zambujeira do Mar	Portugal	Festival Sudoeste
12 August 2009	Budapest	Hungary	Sziget Festival
14 August 2009	Oslo	Norway	Øyafestivalen
15 August 2009	Gothenburg	Sweden	Way Out West
16 August 2009	Helsinki	Finland	Flow Festival
21 August 2009	Biddinghuizen	Netherlands	A Campingflight to Lowlands Paradise
22 August 2009	Chelmsford	England	V Festival
23 August 2009	Stafford	England	V Festival
12 September 2009	Isle of Wight	England	Bestival
South America
16 September 2009	São Paulo	Brazil	Via Funchal
17 September 2009	Rio de Janeiro	Brazil	HSBC Arena
19 September 2009	Buenos Aires	Argentina	Luna Park
Europe
22 October 2009	Paris	France	Zénith de Paris
23 October 2009	Antwerp	Belgium	Lotto Arena
25 October 2009	Amsterdam	Netherlands	Heineken Music Hall
28 October 2009	Milan	Italy	Alcatraz
30 October 2009	Prague	Czech Republic	SaSaZu
31 October 2009	Berlin	Germany	Huxleys Neue Welt
1 November 2009	Hamburg	Germany	Docks
16 November 2009	Sheffield	England	O_{2} Academy
17 November 2009	Manchester	England	Carling Apollo Manchester
18 November 2009	Manchester	England	Carling Apollo Manchester
20 November 2009	Bournemouth	England	Bournemouth International Centre
21 November 2009	Plymouth	England	Plymouth Pavilions
22 November 2009	Swindon	England	Oasis Leisure Centre
24 November 2009	Birmingham	England	National Indoor Arena
25 November 2009	Glasgow	Scotland	Scottish Exhibition and Conference Centre
27 November 2009	London	England	Brixton Academy
28 November 2009	London	England	Brixton Academy
8 December 2009	Dublin	Ireland	The O_{2}
9 December 2009	Liverpool	England	Echo Arena Liverpool
10 December 2009	Nottingham	England	Trent FM Arena
11 December 2009	Cardiff	Wales	Cardiff International Arena
13 December 2009	Brighton	England	Brighton Centre
15 December 2009	London	England	Brixton Academy
17 December 2009	London	England	Brixton Academy
Oceania
15 January 2010	Auckland	New Zealand	Big Day Out
17 January 2010	Gold Coast	Australia	Big Day Out
19 January 2010	Brisbane	Australia	Riverstage
21 January 2010	Sydney	Australia	Hordern Pavilion
22 January 2010	Sydney	Australia	Big Day Out
23 January 2010	Sydney	Australia	Big Day Out
26 January 2010	Melbourne	Australia	Big Day Out
28 January 2010	Melbourne	Australia	Festival Hall
29 January 2010	Adelaide	Australia	Big Day Out
31 January 2010	Perth	Australia	Big Day Out
Europe
5 March 2010	Manchester	England	Manchester Evening News Arena
7 March 2010	London	England	The O2 Arena
2 July 2010	Borlänge	Sweden	Peace & Love Festival
4 July 2010	London	England	Hyde Park
18 July 2010	Benicàssim	Spain	Benicàssim Festival
8 August 2010	Herefordshire	England	The Big Chill Festival
10 September 2010	London	England	Wembley Stadium

=== Box office score data ===
Venue	City	Tickets sold / available	Gross revenue
The Academy	Dublin	830 / 830 (100%)	$32,205
First Avenue	Minneapolis	1,536 / 1,534 (100+%)	$36,816
Riviera Theatre	Chicago	2,500 / 2,500 (100%)	$66,250
Saint Andrew's Hall	Detroit	818 / 818 (100%)	$19,900
9.30 Club	Washington, D.C.	1,200 / 1,200 (100%)	$30,000
Sound Academy	Toronto	2,495 / 2,495 (100%)	$54,360
TOTAL		9,379 / 9,377 (100%)	$239,531
