= F.U.E.P. =

EP by Lily Allen
- Released: 31 March 2009
- Recorded: 2008
- Genre: Pop; dance; R&B
- Length: 13:54
- Label: Capitol
- Producer: Greg Kurstin

Lily Allen chronology
It's Not Me, It's You (2009)	F.U.E.P. (2009)	Paris Live Session (2009)

F.U.E.P. (Fuck You Extended Play) is the first extended play by British recording artist Lily Allen. It was released on 31 March 2009 by Capitol Records exclusively to iTunes U.S. store. Its cover art is a simple shot taken during the It's Not Me, It's You promo shoot. It features a clean edit of "Fuck You", the cover of Britney Spears' song "Womanizer" and the B-sides to the single "The Fear", entitled "Fag Hag" and "Kabul Shit".

== Track listing ==
All tracks are written by Lily Allen and Greg Kurstin, except "Womanizer", which was written by Nikesha Briscoe and Rafael Akinyemi. All songs produced by Kurstin.

No.	Title	Length
1.	"Fuck You" (clean radio edit)	3:41
2.	"Fag Hag"	2:55
3.	"Kabul Shit"	3:45
4.	"Womanizer" (acoustic version)	3:33
