= 22 (Lily Allen song) =

2009 single by Lily Allen

Single by Lily Allen

from the album It's Not Me, It's You
- Released: 24 August 2009
- Genre: Pop; jazz-pop
- Length: 3:06
- Label: Regal
- Songwriters: Lily Allen; Greg Kurstin
- Producer: Greg Kurstin

Lily Allen singles chronology
"Fuck You" (2009)	"22" (2009)	"Who'd Have Known" (2009)

Music video
- "22" on YouTube

"22" ("Twenty-Two") is a song by English singer Lily Allen from her second studio album, It's Not Me, It's You (2009). Written by Allen and Greg Kurstin, the song was released as the fourth international single of the album, but the third in the United Kingdom. It was released to the music market on 24 August 2009 by Regal Recordings, though a different version called "22 (Vingt Deux)" was released in France.

Contemporary critics were mixed in their reviews of the song, some complimenting the rousing sound and the lyrics, which hide her maturity. The single peaked inside the top twenty of the charts of the UK Singles Chart, in Ireland, the Netherlands and Australia, giving the singer her third consecutive top 20 hit in both countries. The accompanying music video portrayed a self-reflection theme, Allen taking a view over her past-self in the mirror and realising her life was wasted on superficial matters. The song was performed live as part of Allen's 2009 concert tour. "22" appears on the international soundtrack to the Brazilian soap opera Viver a Vida.

== Background and composition ==
While describing the album, Allen said that "we decided to try and make bigger sounding, more ethereal songs, real songs". She chose "22" as a single from the album, and later declared that, lyrically, the song describes a near thirty-year-old woman realizing she's at the end of her prime. The singer commented on the song's meaning:

It's more about girls that haven't figured out what they want to do with themselves. Especially really pretty girls. They can rely on their looks to an extent: people will pay for their dinners and drinks and they don't really have to think. And then suddenly it hits them that they're not doing anything with their lives and it's too late. And, yes, it's about a specific person. Most of my songs start like that and then become more general.

"22"
A 30 second sample of "22", in which Allen sings the chorus.

Musically, the song is set in the time signature of common time and in the key of C minor, with a metronome of 132 beats per minute. It has a basic sequence of A♭—E♭/G—Fm—G7—F7 as its chord progression, while piano, synths and percussion are used for the background music, with occasional flourishes from harpsichord and organ. The single distributed in France includes a duet with French singer Ours, called "22 (Vingt Deux)", which is also present on the Paris Live Session.

== Critical reception ==
"22" received mixed reviews from music critics. Jody Rosen from Rolling Stone called the song "rousing" and single-worthy, while AllMusic reviewer Stephen Thomas Erlewine states that Allen may feel more mature than her age and rather than directly suggest it, "puts it into the character sketch" of the song. Mayer Nissim of the Digital Spy awarded "22" three stars and wrote that the song projects the life of a "Bridget Jones-type everywoman" and complimented the lyrics, but went on to say that Allen's "nursery rhyme melodies" are losing originality. Lucy Davies from the BBC considered that if, in the singer's opinion, women who are single and approaching thirty are worthless to society, then she could be "an unreconstructed male in a young woman's body". Sal Cinquemani from Slant Magazine compared the song to Fiona Apple's Extraordinary Machine album. A reviewer from The Canadian Press viewed the song as "nouveau-feminist ditty", which "swings on finger snaps and circus-sounding organ reminiscent of the Beatles' Sgt. Pepper's Lonely Hearts Club Band".

== Commercial performance ==
The single debuted at number 79 on the UK Singles Chart and peaked at number 14, giving Allen her eighth top 20 hit there. Similar success came in Ireland, where it peaked at number 12 and charted for 10 weeks, becoming her third top 20 hit from It's Not Me, It's You in that country, as well as in Australia, where it climbed to its highest position at number 12, and was certified gold by the Australian Recording Industry Association for selling over 35,000 copies. In mainland Europe, the duet with Ours managed to peak at number 23 in France, while the original version had moderate success made it chart outside the top 40 in Belgium (Flanders) and Germany, and at number 34 in Belgium (Wallonia). For this, the single reached number 43 on Billboard's Eurochart Hot 100 Singles. Later peaks include New Zealand at number 28, number 18 on the Dutch Top 40 and lower positions in Austria and Switzerland. The song managed to debut at number 4 in Scotland, but fell 10 places the next week, & 20 more the next.

== Music video ==
The 'older' Allen, as seen in the music video for "22".

The music video was shot in the bathrooms of Freemasons' Hall, Great Queen Street, London on 1 June 2009 and was directed by Jake Scott.

The Daily Mirror reported that Allen was wearing a chocolate coloured dress, sporting her new short hairstyle and performing with twenty trained dancers. During filming, a source stated that, "Lily is in fantastic shape and was keen to show off her curves. As with most of her videos, there are quite a few surprises in store. Lily was keen to try different things and is never afraid to poke fun at herself".

The video begins with Allen walking into a women's bathroom of a nightclub and joins other women in putting on make-up. While she sings the first verse, she stands out from the rest of the women, by seeming confused and having sloppy hair. As the refrain begins, she puts lipstick on and stares into the mirror, where her former, younger self is doing the same, in form of a reflection. Then, the 'younger' Allen carries forward with the song, as the 'older' one continues to put make-up on. During the second verse, the camera moves to the other persons in the bathroom, who are either vomiting or adjusting their clothes. As the chorus approaches again, all the women from the room gather around the mirror, with Allen in the centre, and join her in singing. The scene suddenly changes, seeing 'young' Allen alone in the same bathroom, this time with a man with whom she dances around the central sink unit, while the bridge to the song is coming to an end. She walks alone to the mirror, singing the final refrain, and sees the 'older' Allen in her reflection. Considering that she could be like that in the future, she leaves the real bathroom scene in disgust.

== Track listing ==
- UK CD single
1. "22" – 3:05
2. "Not Fair" (Far Too Loud Electro Radio Edit) – 3:20
- French CD single
1. "22 (Vingt Deux)" (Duet With Ours) – 3:09
2. "22" – 3:05
3. "Not Fair" (Far Too Loud Electro Radio Edit) – 3:20
- UK Promo CD
1. "22" – 3:09
2. "22" (Instrumental) – 3:07
- 7" Limited Edition Picture Disc
1. "22" – 3:05
2. "22" (The Big Pink Remix) – 5:07
- Digital EP
1. "22" – 3:08
2. "22" (The Big Pink Remix) – 5:09
3. "Not Fair" (Far Too Loud Electro Radio Edit) – 3:20

== Credits and personnel ==
- Lead vocals – Lily Allen
- Written by – Lily Allen and Greg Kurstin
- Produced by – Greg Kurstin
- Audio mixing – Greg Kurstin
- Recorded by, Keyboards, Bass, Guitar, Programmed by – Greg Kurstin
- Art Direction, Commissioning – Dan Sanders

== Charts and sales ==
=== Charts ===
Chart (2009–10)	Peak position
Australian Singles Chart	12
Austrian Singles Chart	54
Belgian Singles Chart (Flanders)	43
Belgian Singles Chart (Wallonia)	34
Croatia International Airplay (HRT)	10
Dutch Top 40	18
European Hot 100	43
French Singles Chart	23
German Singles Chart	85
Irish Singles Chart	12
New Zealand Singles Chart	28
Scottish Singles Chart	4
Swiss Singles Chart	71
UK Singles Chart	14

=== End-of-year charts ===
Chart (2009)	Position
Croatia International Airplay (HRT)	77
UK Singles Chart	171

=== Sales and certifications ===
Region	Certification	Certified units/sales
Australia (ARIA)	Gold	35,000^{^}
United Kingdom (BPI)	Silver	200,000^{‡}
^{^} Shipments figures based on certification alone.^{‡} Sales+streaming figures based on certification alone.
