= Not Fair =

2009 single by Lily Allen

Single by Lily Allen

from the album It's Not Me, It's You
- B-side: "Why"
- Released: 20 March 2009
- Genre: Country; bluegrass
- Length: 3:23
- Label: Regal
- Songwriters: Lily Allen; Greg Kurstin
- Producer: Greg Kurstin

Lily Allen singles chronology
| "The Fear" (2008) | "Not Fair" (2009) | "Fuck You" (2009) |

Music video
- "Not Fair" on YouTube

"Not Fair" is a song by English singer Lily Allen from her second studio album, It's Not Me, It's You (2009). Written by Allen and Greg Kurstin, the song was released as the second single from the album on 20 March 2009 by Regal Recordings. The song incorporates country music as the lyrics depict sexual frustration. Contemporary critics did not positively receive the song and its theme, with some calling it a "pseudo-country track" and considering it a strange musical composition. The single peaked in the top 20 of the charts of some European countries and Australia, while scoring Allen's second consecutive top-five hit on both the UK Singles Chart and the Dutch Top 40 (since in the latter "Fuck You" was a commercial success before "Not Fair").

The accompanying music video portrayed a western country theme, with Allen dancing next to a microphone while backing singers are dressed as cowgirls, accompanied by cattle and poultry. The video was shot the same day of the release of the single. It was performed live on different occasions, including Allen's 2009 concert tour. In Australia, the song was ranked at number eight on the Triple J Hottest 100 of 2009.

== Background ==
In the song, Allen describes her relationship with a boyfriend to which she describes him as "the perfect guy" yet is frustrated at his sexual laziness. She furthermore describes the situation as "Not Fair" because while he plays the perfect boyfriend in every other way, he is selfish when it comes to their sex life ("all you do is take") – thus the song gives the impression that all his niceness and concern may have been just a face to get what he wants from his girlfriend without any genuine concern with her satisfaction and happiness.

The single was officially released on January and climbed the charts, still being in the top 10 in June. The single was released as a digital download on 21 March 2009 (iTunes) and on 11 May 2009 as a CD. Allen performed it live for the first time on Ant & Dec's Saturday Night Takeaway on 21 March 2009.

The censored version of the song, which is often used on the radio, blanks out the words "wet patch" and "I spent ages giving head" on the second verse, replacing them with a burst of the background instruments. An alternative version only removes the word "head", replacing it with a short chord played on a mouth organ. While performing the song in the BBC Radio Live Lounge and on The Graham Norton Show, she replaced the latter with "I spent ages kneading bread".

== Composition ==
"Not Fair" is a "bluegrass-infused" country song.

== Commercial performance ==
"Not Fair" charted two months before the release date at number 200 in the United Kingdom. By 2 May 2009, "Not Fair" had reached the number-10 spot on UK Singles Chart before reaching a peak of number five. In New Zealand, the song debuted at number 32 and peaked at number 20, giving Allen her fifth top-40 hit there. The song has also been a big hit in Australia, where it peaked at number three and spent eight consecutive weeks in the top 10, equalling the success of her previous single "The Fear".

== Music video ==
Allen in the 1970s-inspired music video for "Not Fair"

The music video for "Not Fair" was directed by Melina Matsoukas and filmed in Los Angeles on 19 February 2009. Allen released pictures from the video on her official Twitter account. A 17-second teaser of the video was released on YouTube on 17 March, before T4 premiered the entire video on Saturday, 21 March. As of May 2026, it has gained over 135 million views on YouTube.

The music video shows Allen performing the song on the Porter Wagoner Show, starting off with a snippet from the Porter Wagoner show from the 1970s to present Allen (dubbed) by saying, "Now it's time for the purty little lady to come forth with a real purty song. And it's called "Not Fair". Let's make her welcome, Miss Lily Allen!"

Allen is revealed to be singing alongside a country and western band, including a very bored-looking drummer, mullet-wearing guitarists, and backing singers/dancers. Allen performs the song into a microphone and can be seen dancing around the stage, dressed in a white jumpsuit and sporting a blunt fringe with long hair. The video was recorded on videotape and with a real vacuum tube TV camera (as can be seen by the "comet trails" at 1:56 when the camera pans away from the studio lights) to keep with the theme of the video, as opposed to being filmed like most other music videos made in the 21st century.

== Track listing ==
EU CD Single

1. "Not Fair" (explicit) – 3:20
2. "The Fear" (The Count (Hervé) & Lily Face the Fear remix) – 4:21

AU CD Single

1. "Not Fair" (radio edit) – 3:03
2. "The Fear" (The Count (Hervé) & Lily Face the Fear remix) – 4:21
3. "Not Fair" (Di Angelis & Dobie 'Circus' remix) – 5:36
4. "Not Fair" (Style of Eye remix) – 6:14

7-inch limited edition picture disc

1. "Not Fair" (radio edit) – 3:03
2. "Why" – 3:16

Digital download

1. "Not Fair" – 3:23
2. "Why" – 3:38
3. "Not Fair" (Style of Eye remix) – 6:19
4. "The Count (Hervé) and Lily Allen Face the Fear" – 4:22
5. "Not Fair" (clean radio edit) – 3:24
6. "Mr. Blue Sky" – 3:41

== Charts ==
=== Weekly charts ===
Weekly chart performance for "Not Fair"
| Chart (2009–10) | Peak position |
|---|---|
| Australia (ARIA) | 3 |
| Austria (Ö3 Austria Top 40) | 6 |
| Belgium (Ultratop 50 Flanders) | 15 |
| Belgian Airplay (Ultratop Flanders) | 2 |
| Belgium (Ultratop 50 Wallonia) | 12 |
| Czech Republic Airplay (ČNS IFPI) | 1 |
| Denmark (Tracklisten) | 34 |
| Europe (European Hot 100) | 12 |
| Germany (GfK) | 12 |
| Hungary (Editors' Choice Top 40) | 27 |
| Ireland (IRMA) | 3 |
| Israel (Media Forest) | 1 |
| Italy (FIMI) | 4 |
| Netherlands (Dutch Top 40) | 4 |
| Netherlands (Single Top 100) | 9 |
| New Zealand (Recorded Music NZ) | 20 |
| Scottish Singles Sales (Official Charts) | 2 |
| Slovakia (IFPI) | 1 |
| Sweden (Sverigetopplistan) | 26 |
| Switzerland (Schweizer Hitparade) | 6 |
| UK Singles (Official Charts) | 5 |

=== Year-end charts ===
| Chart (2009) | Position |
|---|---|
| Australia (ARIA) | 20 |
| Austria (Ö3 Austria Top 40) | 23 |
| Germany (Media Control GfK) | 35 |
| Italy (FIMI) | 29 |
| Netherlands (Dutch Top 40) | 30 |
| Netherlands (Single Top 100) | 55 |
| Switzerland (Schweizer Hitparade) | 22 |
| UK Singles (OCC) | 32 |

== Certifications ==
| Region | Certification | Certified units/sales |
|---|---|---|
| Australia (ARIA) | Platinum | 70,000^{^} |
| Germany (BVMI) | Gold | 300,000^{‡} |
| New Zealand (RMNZ) | Platinum | 30,000^{‡} |
| Switzerland (IFPI Switzerland) | Gold | 15,000^{^} |
| United Kingdom (BPI) | 2× Platinum | 1,200,000^{‡} |
^{^} Shipments figures based on certification alone.^{‡} Sales+streaming figures based on certification alone.

== Release history ==
| Region | Date | Format |
|---|---|---|
| United Kingdom; Australia | 20 March 2009 | Digital download |
| Germany | 20 March 2009 | Digital download |
| Germany | 8 May 2009 | CD single |
| Australia | | CD single |
| Australia | 9 May 2009 | CD single |
| United Kingdom | 11 May 2009 | CD single |
| United States | June 2009 | Digital |
