= Back to the Start (song) =

Promotional single by Lily Allen

from the album It's Not Me, It's You
- Released: 17 April 2010 (UK, Australia)
- Recorded: 2007
- Studio: Home studio (Moreton-in-Marsh, Gloucestershire, England)
- Genre: Synth-pop
- Length: 4:14
- Label: Regal
- Songwriters: Lily Allen; Greg Kurstin
- Producer: Greg Kurstin

Lily Allen promotional singles chronology
"The Fear (The People vs. Lily Allen)" (2010)	"Back to the Start" (2010)	"Sheezus" (2014)

Audio video
- "Lily Allen | Back to the Start (official audio)" on YouTube

"Back to the Start" is a song by British singer-songwriter Lily Allen, from her second studio album, It's Not Me, It's You. It was released as a promotional single from the album, and also as a 7" vinyl record with one of Allen's previously released songs as a B-side, "Kabul Shit".

"Back to the Start" was played in nightly radio countdowns in Australia and peaked at No. 21 on the Australian Airplay Chart. There is no music video for the song.

== Record Store Day ==
Lily Allen was one of twelve acts on the Parlophone label to have an exclusive record released for UK Record Store Day 2010. The song chosen was "Back to the Start", with previous B-side "Kabul Shit" featuring again as the B-side to the single. It was released on a 7" vinyl-only format, limited to 1,000 copies and was only available from selected independent music stores across the UK on 17 April 2010. The song could also be cherry-picked from the regular album download.

== Background ==
Lyrically, the song is an apology to Allen's older half-sister Sarah Owen, who she didn't get along with when they were teenagers. During a track by track interview for It's Not Me, It's You, Allen stated "We had a rocky relationship for years and years and years and it was just getting to the point where we just couldn't argue like teenagers anymore, so I played it to her a long time ago and it's kinda worked, we've sorted a lot of things out."

Allen plays a glockenspiel solo in the bridge of the song.

== Track listing ==
- Limited Edition 7" vinyl
1. "Back to the Start" – 4:14
2. "Kabul Shit" – 3:45

== Charts ==
Chart (2010)	Peak position
Australian Airplay Chart	21
