= Smile (Lily Allen song) =

2006 single by Lily Allen

Single by Lily Allen

from the album Alright, Still
- B-side: "Cheryl Tweedy"; "Absolutely Nothing"
- Released: 3 July 2006
- Genre: Reggae pop; rocksteady
- Length: 3:16
- Label: Regal
- Songwriters: Lily Allen; Iyiola Babalola; Darren Lewis; Jackie Mittoo; Clement Dodd
- Producer: Future Cut

Lily Allen singles chronology
| "Smile" (2006) | "LDN" (2006) |

Music video
- "Smile" on YouTube

"Smile" is the debut single by British recording singer-songwriter Lily Allen from her debut studio album, Alright, Still (2006). It was written by Allen, Iyiola Babalola and Darren Lewis, while sampling the Soul Brothers' "Free Soul". The song was released as the lead mainstream single of the album in July 2006. After signing a contract deal with Regal Recordings and gaining popularity on the social network website Myspace with demo songs, Allen released a limited edition of "LDN" to promote her work and afterwards announced the release of "Smile".

The song incorporates rocksteady music, while the lyrics tackle her dealing with the betrayal of her boyfriend, while enjoying his misery. Most contemporary critics complimented the song, noticing the confidence it hides and the carnival-esque, yet melancholy, theme. On the other hand, some considered it was not one of the album's best tracks and it makes the singer a "theoretical pop princess". The single peaked inside the top 40 of the charts of some European countries and Australia, while staying on the summit of the UK Singles Chart for two consecutive weeks and ended the year as the country's 11th-most-successful song. It also charted on the U.S. Billboard Hot 100, where it was certified gold.

For promotion, "Smile" was re-recorded in Simlish and played on shows. The accompanying music video portrayed a revenge theme, with Allen hiring a posse to beat her ex-boyfriend. It was directed by Sophie Muller and, afterwards, banned on MTV due to obscene language. The song was performed live many times, including on talk shows, her 2007 concert tour and also during her 2009 concert tour, though Allen claimed to be "sick" of it. In 2008, it won a Pop Award at the London Broadcast Music Incorporated Awards.

== Background ==
After meeting George Lamb on a holiday in Ibiza, Allen made him her manager. Lamb later introduced the singer to production duo Future Cut, with whom she had written and produced demos, which were sent to various labels. In 2005, Allen was signed to Regal Records, who gave her £25,000 to produce an album. The singer considered it to be a "small development idea", as they were also unable to provide much support for it due to their preoccupation with other releases. Taking advice from Lady Sovereign, the singer created an account on MySpace and began posting demo songs in November 2005. By March 2006, they attracted thousands of listeners, and 500 limited edition 7-inch vinyl singles of one of the demos, a song titled "LDN", were rush-released and sold for as much as £40. Allen also produced two mixtapes to promote her work. As she accumulated tens of thousands of MySpace friends, The Observer Music Monthly took interest. Few people outside of her label's A&R department had heard of Allen, so the label was slow in responding to publications who wanted to report about her. Her label was not pleased with the sound of the demos, so they assigned the singer to "more mainstream producers and top-line writers". After that, they finally approved some of her songs, being confident of their inclusion on the album. "Smile" was among the chosen ones, that Allen claimed she was happy with. It was the first song she had ever written, claiming:

When I set out to do this I knew I wanted to make songs that sounded a) up to date and now and b) really organic. Because you can't get really good players without spending loads of money these days, the only other option is to sample. The first song I ever wrote was 'Smile'. We just went through about seven or eight sample lyrics, found a beat, put it all in... Then when it comes to writing lyrics I write... like a rapper would, I suppose, with absolutely no melody involved whatsoever, I'm just getting my flow sorted. Then I write the whole text of the song and then ad lib the melody into the microphone. It's not terribly clever!

"Smile" was released as a single in the United Kingdom on 3 July 2006. The maxi single format contains two B-sides, "Absolutely Nothing" and "Cheryl Tweedy", which Allen struggled to get on the album but lost them in favour of "Take What You Take". The latter is a satirical song about celebrity, finding the commercial promotion side of the celebrity machine uncomfortable, while mentioning Girls Aloud member Cheryl Tweedy, but argued she doesn't "have anything against her".

== Music structure and lyrics ==
"Smile"
A 30-second sample of "Smile", in which the chorus is played

Musically, "Smile" is a bubbly, mid-tempo tune with "a barroom piano lick", subdued horns and a reggae beat, singing in a light falsetto, while the organ riff contains a sample of Jackie Mittoo playing keyboards on the 1960s rocksteady song "Free Soul" by the Soul Brothers, also written by Mittoo. He and Clement Dodd received credit on the song as co-writers. It was described to have a "cod-reggae groove that smoulders like a barbecue", as a guitar and piano were used for the background music, following the notes Gm—F as its basic chord progression. It is set in the time signature of common time, having a metronome of 96 beats per minute, and is played in the key of F major. Lyrically, the song describes Allen's satisfaction in her former lover's suffering, being in a vengeful mood: "At worst / I feel bad for a while, / But then I just smile / I go ahead and smile," thus creating a contrast between "the peppy melody and brassy lyrics". The inspiration for the song came from a real life experience, when Allen broke up with her then boyfriend, Lester Lloyd, resulting in a drug overdose and hospitalization for her depression. The singer claimed "I started to get depressed and anyone who suffers from depression knows that it can soon get so bad that you can't get out of bed. It was then that I checked into the Priory. That was really tough as I was an emotional mess. [...] The lyrics are definitely bitter-sweet". Allen said she later regretted the direct approach of her lyrics:

I'm now less inclined to do that, because everything that I do say gets repeated in a way that I haven't said it, or taken out of context and spun in some negative way — and it makes me really sad. I'm not, like, a negative person. I'm actually quite positive, but this industry has really made me feel angry and negative recently. I'm not enjoying it at the moment.

== Critical reception ==
"Smile" was met with mixed to positive reviews from music critics. According to Heather Phares of AllMusic, the song "has a silky verse melody that just barely conceals [the singer's] spite", while she keeps "her revenge sweet, the extra sting being given to it by the way she sounds like she's singing about how ice cream or puppies or being in love makes her smile". Blender reporter Jon Dolan claims that Allen "deploys a sugary melody as a Trojan horse for a smackdown on a douche-bag ex-boyfriend", as Rob Webb from Drowned in Sound called "Smile" an "infectious slice of bouncing, carnival reggae that punches hard with its opening line: 'When you first left me / I was wanting more / But you were fucking that girl next door / What you do that for?,'" and went on to say that the theme of the song is melancholy, "set against breezy beats", and while not being "an obvious TOTP contender on the surface, [it] is good but far from one of the LP's choice cuts". Rob Sheffield from Rolling Stone gave a rather negative review, claiming the singer "doesn't sound as if she's trying too hard", singing the song with a "breezy sha-la-la lilt that just made the song seem even nastier". Later, he called Allen a "theoretical pop princess, who just entered the breakup-song hall of fame". Dom Passantino of Stylus Magazine suggested that "'Smile' gets burned off the lights by both Sean Paul and Abs when it comes to facsimiles of 'Uptown Top Ranking,' but neither of them could bring the quality of lyricism the singer does," while Slant Magazine reporter Sal Cinquemani was baffled as to why the song, which she "sings without a smirk of irony", is a UK chart-topper.

The reviewer from NME considered that the song sashays along with sass, while still remaining charming, and said that though it doesn't mark Allen out as excellent dating material, as a soundtrack to the summer, "it’s a dead fackin’ cert". Adrien Begrand of PopMatters called "Smile" just as good as "LDN", "its loose reggae arrangement augmented by the clever sample of Jackie Mittoo’s piano from the Soul Brothers’ 60s rocksteady tune "Free Soul", as Allen sings bitterly about her ex, with just a hint of vulnerability at first, before going to her friends for reassurance, and confronting the guy during the chorus with a mean-spirited confidence that has us cheering inside". While John Murphy of MusicOMH praised the song and its "gently lilting reggae rhythm", Priya Elan from NME considered that the Althea & Donna groove of "Smile" is what made fans "fall for her in the first place". The former argued that "even people who profess to hate pop music will secretly be tapping a foot to it and claiming it is just downright perfect pop for lolling around during the lazy warm, guaranteed to cheer the listeners up, no matter how down they're feeling". Other reviews came from The Guardian reporter Sophie Heawood, who didn't consider the song as Allen's greatest effort, but still thought she was far better than being called "the female Mike Skinner".

In October 2011, NME placed it at number 104 on its list "150 Best Tracks of the Past 15 Years".

== Commercial performance ==
"Smile" was released to the iTunes Store in the United Kingdom in the spring of 2006 and spent its first week at number 1 on the iTunes chart, before entering the main UK Singles Chart at number thirteen, based on download sales alone. The next week, on the issue of 15 July 2006, it rose to the summit of the chart, selling 39,501 copies, knocking Shakira's "Hips Don't Lie" off the top spot and spending two consecutive weeks there. It later descended to number four, being replaced by McFly's "Please, Please". It was her very first single in her home country's main charts, following a top 40 entry with the limited release of "LDN" the same year. It ended 2006 as UK's 11th best selling single of the year. Allen was surprised at the success of it, stating: "Of course, I never thought the record would chart - I didn't even think I'd get a record contract". She was named "one of the brightest hopes for domestic crossover rap" because of this single. The song shared similar success in Ireland, where it debuted on the issue of 6 July 2006 and peaked inside the top ten at six, holding on the chart for nine weeks. In mainland Europe, it broke the top 40 of most countries, but was not as successful as in the singer's home country. Notable successes were ten on the Dutch Top 40, sixteen on the French Singles Chart and 21 on the Swiss Singles Chart. Across the ocean, "Smile" reached 14 on the ARIA Charts and in New Zealand peaked inside the top ten at six.

In North America, the song only managed to peak at 49 on the main Billboard chart in the U.S. on the issue of 24 February 2007 and spent 12 weeks on the chart. On the same week, it climbed to 29 on the Hot Digital Songs and, later in May, reached 35 on the Pop Songs chart and 20 on the Hot Adult Top 40 Tracks. Despite its low position, "Smile" managed to slowly sell over 500,000 copies in paid digital download and was certified Gold by the Recording Industry Association of America on 9 February 2009; it remained Allen's highest-charting single in the country until T-Pain's "5 O'Clock", which featured Allen, peaked at number 10 in 2011. Nonetheless, "Smile" remains Allen's highest-charting song as a solo artist in the United States, one of three entries to chart there (alongside "Fuck You" and "The Fear"). It also peaked at 86 on the Canadian Singles Chart.

== Music video ==
Elliott Jordan, as the ex-boyfriend, gesticulating how he was beaten up, and Allen in the official music video for "Smile".

The song's music video was released on 3 July 2006. Having been directed by Sophie Muller, it contained a vengeance theme, similar to that of the song. It starts off with Allen sitting on the bed in her apartment, eating chocolate and cheese balls. Interleaved, shots of her and her ex-boyfriend spending time together appear as a memory. He is played by Elliott Jordan. As the bridge comes up, the scene changes to the singer standing on the corner of a street, talking to a man and paying him money. The man leaves and goes to some gangsters, giving them instructions and each a share of money. As Allen's former lover walks down the street talking on his mobile phone, one of the gangsters pushes him into an abandoned playground, where they are joined by a second gangster, and the pair give Allen's ex a beating. Allen, witnessing the scene, smiles. She then meets with her bruised ex-boyfriend, and takes him to a coffee shop. There, he tried to explain to her how he was beaten by the muggers, not knowing that, meanwhile, they were breaking down his apartment door and destroying his furniture and possessions, including scratching his gramophone records. The ex-boyfriend leaves the table for a while, enough time for Allen to put laxative pills in his coffee; upon returning, he drinks it and leaves the shop. After, he goes to his apartment, only to find it trashed and destroyed. Scavenging through what's left, he happily finds the record box, thinking they are intact, but he suddenly gets diarrhea as a result of the laxatives, but is unable to use his toilet, as it is clogged with his clothes. He goes to Allen's apartment with his records, seeking consolation, unaware that she is laughing behind his back. As the video finishes, the scene changes to Allen walking down the street at night, smiling and singing the last chorus, while her ex-boyfriend, actually a disc jockey, is in a nightclub getting ready to play his music, but finds out that all his records have been scratched.

After the video was banned on MTV in the United Kingdom, Allen commented regarding this in an inverview:

I got really offended when my single 'Smile' got banned [during after-school hours] from MTV in the U.K. because it had the word fuck in it. They said, 'We don't want kids to grow up too quickly.' But then you have Paris Hilton and the Pussycat Dolls taking their clothes off and gyrating up against womanizing, asshole men, and that's acceptable. You're thinking your kids are gonna grow up quicker because they heard the word fuck than from thinking they should be shoving their tits in people's faces?

DJ Ron Slomowicz of About.com criticised the music video, saying it was "mean-spirited", it would "alienate any sort of club fan base she might discover", and that if a male "had his friends beating up his ex-girlfriend, trashing her living space, drugging her and destroying her possessions, he would be branded as violent" and would be shunned, thus questioning the singer's taste level as well as her suitability as a positive role model for young girls.

== Live performances and promotion ==
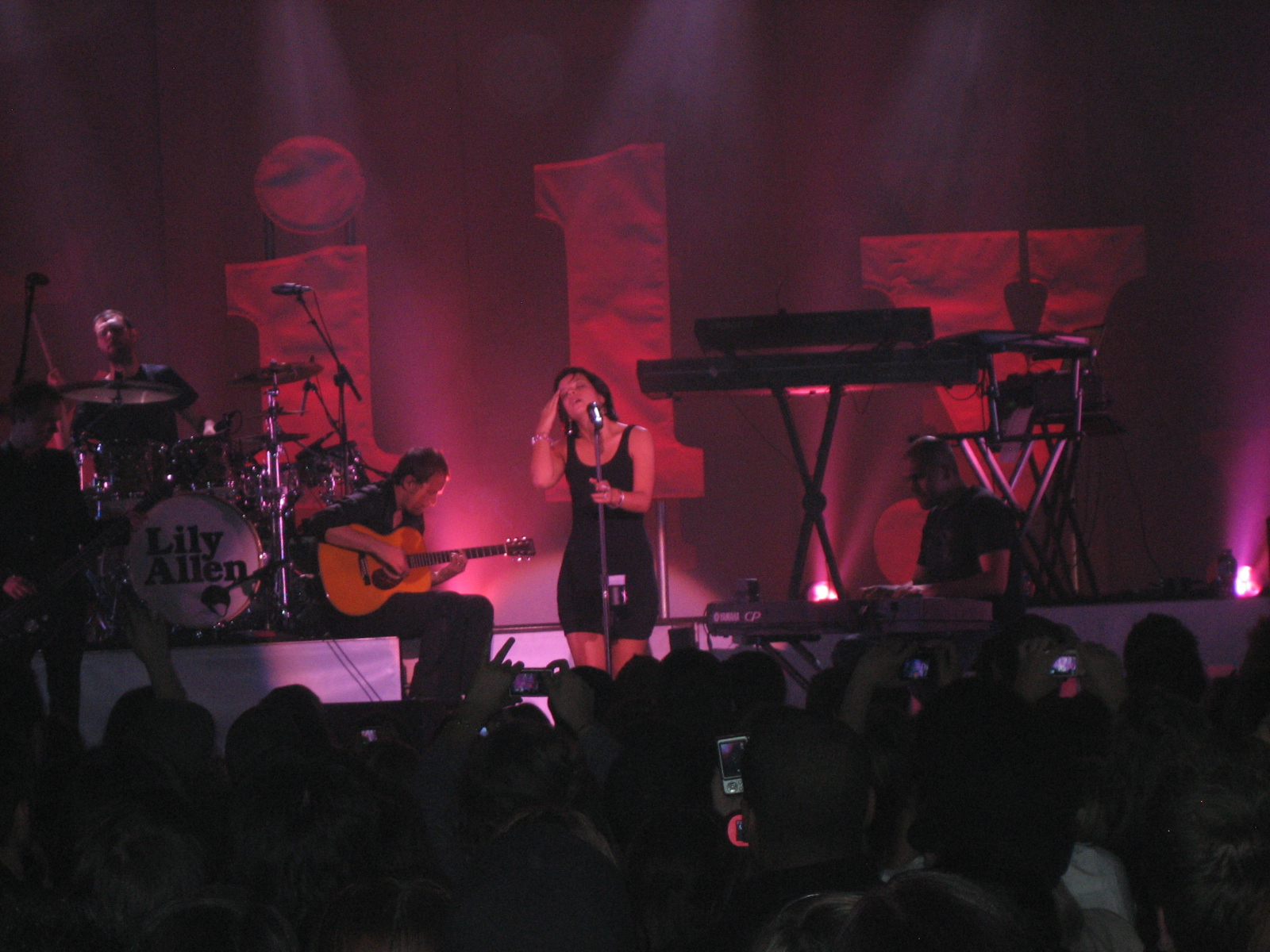
Allen performing during her 2009 concert tour

On the day the single was released, Allen appeared on BBC Radio 1's Live Lounge with DJ Jo Whiley, performing an acoustic version of "Smile", and a cover of The Kooks' song, "Naïve". At the Secret Garden Party, in September 2006, Allen made a rendition of the song and afterwards stated: "The festival was well good, particularly as Lester, my ex, who I wrote 'Smile' about, and subsequently sold his story to the papers, had a tent called 'the shit tent' positioned directly opposite the main stage. So he and his new girlfriend had no option but to watch me perform to a couple of thousand people singing 'Smile' back to me. Oh, it's the little things eh!" "Smile" was performed live as part of the setlist of Allen's 2007 concert tour. During the 2007 South By Southwest music festival, Allen said "I'm so sick of this song, but I'll play it for you, Austin" before singing it. On 3 February 2007, the singer was invited as a musical guest on Saturday Night Live and played this single and "LDN". In 2009, it was on the setlist of Allen's 2009 concert tour, as part of the encore.

== Covers ==
Allen herself re-recorded the single in Simlish, the fictional language used in The Sims games, to help promotion. The Simlish version was used in The Sims expansion pack The Sims 2: Seasons soundtrack, and Allen also had her own character in the game. She declared: "Recording 'Smile' was a great experience for me. Sometimes revenge can be fun. But getting to sing it again [in Simlish] came very naturally and it was hilarious to practice! The silly language and whimsy of The Sims games are a perfect fit for the song. I was laughing the entire time!" An animated music video was made for the Simlish version.

In 2009, the season one episode "Mattress" of the Fox musical comedy/drama Glee, "Smile" was covered by the character Rachel, voiced by Lea Michele; the version was made available as an iTunes single download and was later included on the second volume of the season one soundtracks.

After footballer Ashley Cole joined Chelsea F.C. in 2006, Arsenal F.C. fans created their own version of the song titled "Ashley Cole is a Chelsea batty boy".

== Track listings and formats ==
- UK CD1 and 7-inch single
1. "Smile" – 3:17
2. "Smile" (Gutter Mix) – 2:59
- UK CD2
1. "Smile" – 3:16
2. "Cheryl Tweedy" – 3:15
3. "Absolutely Nothing" – 4:02
4. "Smile" (video) – 3:14
- Digital download
1. "Smile" – 3:17
2. "Smile" (Gutter Mix) – 2:59
3. "Cheryl Tweedy" — 3:15
4. "Absolutely Nothing" – 4:02

=== 2009 versions ===
- Digital EP 1
1. "Smile" (radio edit) – 3:16
2. "Smile Version Revisited" (Mark Ronson remix—edited version) – 3:15
3. "Smile" (Digital Soundboy remix) – 5:00
4. "Smile" (Simlish version) – 3:14
5. "Smile" (acoustic version) – 3:20
- Digital EP 2
1. "Smile" (radio edit) – 3:16
2. "Smile" (Gutter Mix) – 2:59
3. "Smile Version Revisited" (Mark Ronson remix) – 3:12
4. "Smile" (live at YOYO) – 4:28

== Credits and personnel ==
- Main vocals — Lily Allen
- Written by — Lily Allen, Darren Lewis, Iyiola Babalola, Jackie Mittoo, Clement Dodd
- Produced by — Future Cut
- Mastered by — Tim Burrell, Tim Debney
- Audio mixing — Future Cut, Mike Pelanconi
- Keyboards — John Ellis
- Engineer — Mike Pelanconi, Darren Lewis
- Drums — Paul Powell
- Bass — Clive Hunte
- Saxophone — Michael Rose
- Trombone — Trevor Edwards
- Guitar — Paul Farr
- Trumpet — Eddie Thornton

== Charts ==
=== Weekly charts ===
Weekly chart performance for "Smile"
| Chart (2006–2007) | Peak position |
|---|---|
| Australia (ARIA) | 14 |
| Austria (Ö3 Austria Top 40) | 40 |
| Belgium (Ultratop 50 Flanders) | 27 |
| Belgium (Ultratop 50 Wallonia) | 33 |
| Canada Hot 100 (Billboard) | 72 |
| CIS Airplay (TopHit) | 16 |
| Croatia (HRT) | 7 |
| Czech Republic Airplay (ČNS IFPI) | 30 |
| Denmark Airplay (Tracklisten) | 2 |
| Europe (Eurochart Hot 100) | 5 |
| France (SNEP) | 16 |
| Germany (GfK) | 67 |
| Hungary (Rádiós Top 40) | 11 |
| Ireland (IRMA) | 6 |
| Italy (FIMI) | 23 |
| Netherlands (Dutch Top 40) | 10 |
| Netherlands (Single Top 100) | 19 |
| New Zealand (Recorded Music NZ) | 6 |
| Russia Airplay (TopHit) | 15 |
| Scottish Singles Sales (Official Charts) | 5 |
| Slovakia Airplay (ČNS IFPI) | 2 |
| Sweden (Sverigetopplistan) | 38 |
| Switzerland (Schweizer Hitparade) | 21 |
| Ukraine Airplay (TopHit) | 166 |
| UK Singles (Official Charts) | 1 |
| US Billboard Hot 100 | 49 |
| US Adult Alternative Airplay (Billboard) | 27 |
| US Adult Pop Airplay (Billboard) | 20 |
| US Pop Airplay (Billboard) | 35 |

=== Year-end charts ===
Year-end chart performance for "Smile"
| Chart (2006) | Position |
|---|---|
| Belgium (Ultratop 50 Flanders) | 92 |
| CIS Airplay (TopHit) | 171 |
| Europe (Eurochart Hot 100) | 67 |
| Hungary (Rádiós Top 40) | 82 |
| Netherlands (Dutch Top 40) | 81 |
| Netherlands (Single Top 100) | 84 |
| Russia Airplay (TopHit) | 158 |
| Switzerland (Schweizer Hitparade) | 87 |
| UK Singles (OCC) | 11 |

== Certifications ==
Certifications and sales for "Smile"
| Region | Certification | Certified units/sales |
|---|---|---|
| Denmark (IFPI Danmark) | Gold | 45,000^{‡} |
| New Zealand (RMNZ) | 2× Platinum | 60,000^{‡} |
| United Kingdom (BPI) | 3× Platinum | 1,800,000^{‡} |
| United States (RIAA) | Gold | 500,000^{*} |
^{*} Sales figures based on certification alone.^{‡} Sales+streaming figures based on certification alone.

== Release history ==
Release dates and formats for "Smile"
| Region | Date | Format(s) | Label(s) | Ref. |
|---|---|---|---|---|
| United Kingdom | 3 July 2006 | CD; maxi CD | Parlophone; Regal | |
| Germany | 14 July 2006 | Maxi CD | EMI | |
| France | 25 September 2006 | CD | Delabel | |
| United States | 28 November 2006 | Adult album alternative radio | Capitol | |
| United States | 6 March 2007 | Contemporary hit radio | Capitol | |
