= Who'd Have Known =

2009 single by Lily Allen

Single by Lily Allen

from the album It's Not Me, It's You
- Released: 30 November 2009
- Recorded: 2007
- Studio: Home studio (Moreton-in-Marsh, Gloucestershire, England)
- Genre: Pop
- Length: 3:50
- Label: Regal
- Songwriters: Gary Barlow; Jason Orange; Mark Owen; Howard Donald; Steve Robson; Lily Allen; Greg Kurstin
- Producers: Greg Kurstin; John Shanks

Lily Allen singles chronology
| "22" (2009) | "Who'd Have Known" (2009) | "Just Be Good to Green" (2010) |

Music video
- "Who'd Have Known" on YouTube

"Who'd Have Known" is a song by English singer Lily Allen from her second studio album, It's Not Me, It's You (2009). Written by Allen and Greg Kurstin, while interpolating Take That's single "Shine", the song was released as the fifth and final single from the album on 30 November 2009 by Regal Recordings. Kurstin co-produced the song with John Shanks (of whom earlier produced "Shine"). Contemporary critics complimented the song and Allen's warm vocals, while the music video portrays her as a groupie of Sir Elton John. The song is prominently sampled in American rapper T-Pain's 2011 song "5 O'Clock", on which Allen is credited as a featured artist. "Who’d Have Known" was the last single Allen released as lead artist before her five-year hiatus.

== Background and composition ==
Before the release of the album, Allen posted the song, then titled "Who'd of Known", on her MySpace account, revealing that she sampled Take That's single "Shine" and wrote: "I ripped off the chorus from Take That and can't be bothered with the paperwork.", for which the single was almost not included on It's Not Me, It's You. The singer pointed out in an interview that "Greg [Kurstin] just played the chords and I sang and we were like, 'That's great, really hooky.' Then when we played it back to someone, they pointed it out that it was, essentially, 'Shine'", and, while the band did not agree to sing on it, they gave her permission to record it, as they liked the song. The group was also credited as co-writer.

Musically, "Who'd Have Known" is set in common time and has a metronome of 84 beats per minute. It is played in the key of F major and follows the chord progression F—Fmaj7/A—E♭—E♭5—Gm7—F, while the piano and guitar are used for the background music.

== Critical reception ==
"Who'd Have Known"
A 30 second sample of "Who'd Have Known", in which Allen sings the chorus.

"Who'd Have Known" received positive reviews from music critics. When reviewing the album, Jody Rosen from Rolling Stone magazine called the song a potential single, being "the ballad with the album's most surefire hook". Neil McCormick from The Daily Telegraph noticed the song in particular, claiming it to be a "tender evocation of friendship turning to love", while Allen's vocals highlight affection. He also added that, on tracks such as this, "Allen still sounds like a real person telling us the most intimate details of her real life, only with better hooks". Drowned in Sound reporter James Skinner suggested that the song "lucidly details the furtive thrills and giddy excitement that lie at the outset of a romantic endeavour" and, in comparison with "Shine", "in slowing the tempo some though, substituting its vapid generalities and platitudes with a warmth both insightful and agreeable, she bests the original considerably". Ryan Dombal from Pitchfork concluded that the song "is prime Lily 2.0, growing up without the heavy-handed, 2D 'maturity'; it's a knowing ode to early love and all the uncertainty, excitement and irrationality that goes along with it".

== Commercial performance ==
The single debuted at number 64 on the UK Singles Chart in the issue of 22 November 2009 and rose to number 49 the next week. The song entered the top 40 at number 39.

== Music video ==
Allen and the Elton John lookalike in the music video for "Who'd Have Known".

The music video for "Who'd Have Known" was directed by James Caddick and portrays Allen as an obsessed fan of Elton John. It starts off with her character lying in bed, watching Elton John's concert on television, while DVDs and magazines portraying him are scattered throughout her room, with a big poster of him on her wall. John (portrayed by an actor) receives a letter from the singer declaring her love, accompanied by a badly photoshopped picture of the two of them, but ignores it. Upon exiting his home, he gets in a car only to discover that Allen is the driver. She locks the car doors, kidnaps him, and takes him to her home, where she ties him to a chair. There, she plays piano, drinks wine, skims magazines, hugs him, attempts to feed him pizza, and draws a portrait of him. Later, she forces him to make a phone call while reading from a series of cue cards (a scene which pays homage to the movie The King of Comedy). Afterwards, they both sit on the sofa, watching John perform on TV. As Allen falls asleep, he manages to wriggle free from the tied ropes on his feet. The video ends with John taking a final glance at Allen asleep before escaping from the building and running off.

== Track listing ==
- Digital Download
1. "Who'd Have Known" – 3:48
2. "The Fear" (Death Metal Disco Scene Vocal Remix) – 5:42
- UK Promo CD
1. "Who'd Have Known" – 3:51
2. "Who'd Have Known" (Instrumental) – 3:48
- Remix Digital Download (2012)
1. "5 O'Clock In The Morning (Who'd Have Known)" (Remix) – 3:37

== Credits and personnel ==
- Lead vocals – Lily Allen
- Written by – Lily Allen, Greg Kurstin, Take That and Steve Robson
- Produced by – Greg Kurstin and John Shanks
- Audio mixing – Greg Kurstin
- Mastered by Geoff Pesche
- Other management – Todd Interland

== Charts ==
| Chart (2009) | Peak position |
|---|---|
| Australia (ARIA) | 54 |
| CIS Airplay (TopHit) | 167 |
| Israel (Media Forest) | 8 |
| Netherlands (Dutch Top 40 Tipparade) | 4 |
| Scottish Singles Sales (Official Charts) | 41 |
| UK Singles (Official Charts) | 39 |
