= Ours (singer) =

French singer

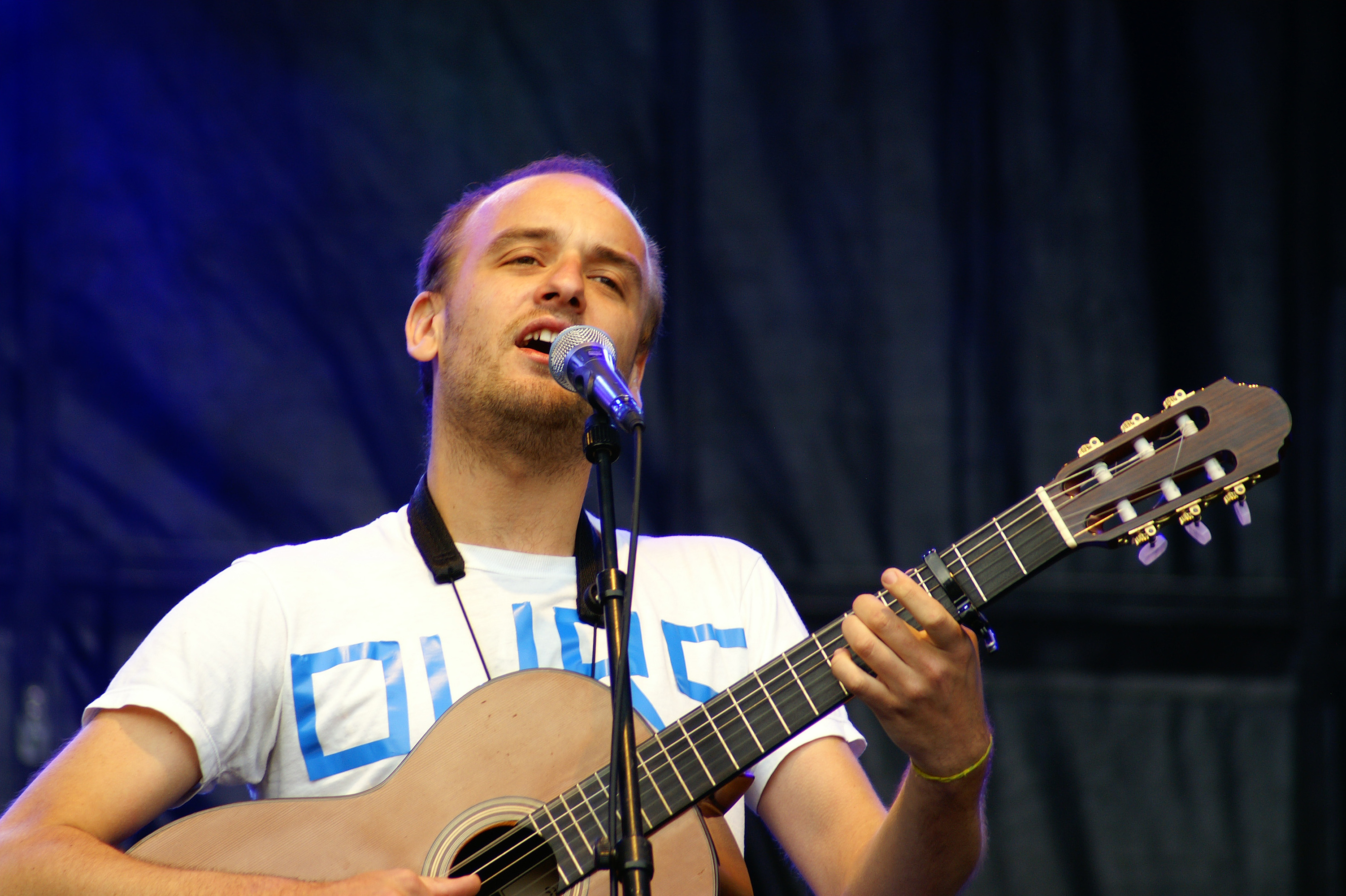

Background information
- Born: Charles Souchon; 1978 (age 47–48); Boulogne-Billancourt, France
- Occupations: Musician, songwriter
- Instruments: Vocals, guitar
- Website: oursmusiqueoff.com

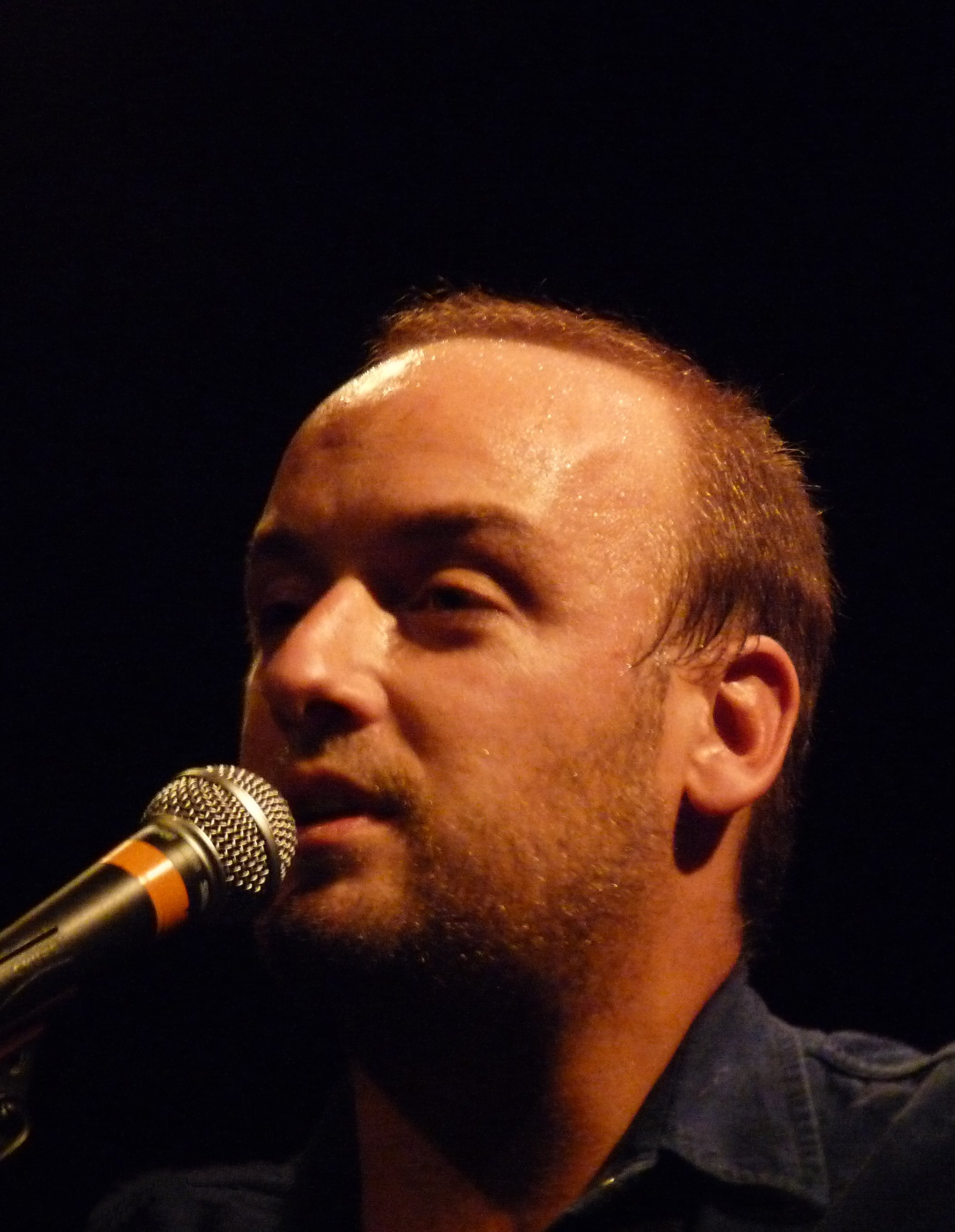
Ours in concert in Perpignan (October 2011)

Charles Souchon (born 1978), better known as Ours, is a French singer and songwriter. He is the second son of Alain Souchon and the younger brother of singer Pierre Souchon.

He released his first album Mi in 2007 and in 2011 the album El. In October 2009 he sang a duet with Lily Allen to generate the French version of her song 22 which was called "22 (Vingt Deux)". The duet was included on the single distributed in France and was also present on the Paris Live Session.

He supported Zazie and Michel Jonasz during their 2007 tours. His 2008 music video "Quand Nina est saoule" was filmed with the American actress Nora Zehetner.

== Discography ==
- 2007: Mi
- 2011: El
- 2017: Pops
- 2021: Mitsouko
- 2025: Le spleen d’une vie sublime
