= Fuck You (Lily Allen song) =

2009 single by Lily Allen

Single by Lily Allen

from the album It's Not Me, It's You
- Released: 10 July 2009
- Genre: Dance-pop
- Length: 3:39
- Label: Regal; Parlophone
- Songwriters: Lily Allen; Greg Kurstin
- Producer: Greg Kurstin

Lily Allen singles chronology
"Not Fair" (2009)	"Fuck You" (2009)	"22" (2009)

Audio sample
- file; help

Music video
- "Fuck You" on YouTube

"Fuck You", originally titled "Guess Who Batman (Fuck You Very Much)", is a song by English singer Lily Allen from her second album, It's Not Me, It's You (2009), as her third international single. A maximalist dance-pop track, its lyrics dismiss and ridicule a bigoted antagonist, criticising their racism, homophobia, and war-mongering. The song was a hit in mainland Europe, topping the chart in Flanders for three weeks and reaching number two in Wallonia and the Netherlands. It became a top-five hit in Finland, Norway, and Switzerland, reached the top 20 in several other European nations, and peaked at number 23 in Australia.

== Background and content ==
The song originally appeared on Allen's Myspace page in 2008 alongside the songs "I Could Say" and "I Don't Know" (later released as "The Fear") under the title "Guess Who Batman". The song samples the piano of the theme to the Australian television show Neighbours. The song was written by Allen and Greg Kurstin. Allen wrote: "We are the youth, we can make coolness for our future, it's up to us. Go green and hate hate."

Despite its reference to Batman, according to NME and Rolling Stone magazines, the song is a protest against George W. Bush. At a concert on 2 April 2009 at the Wiltern Theatre in Los Angeles, Allen stated that the song was about Bush. At a concert in São Paulo, Brazil, Allen stated, "It was originally written about this fucking arsehole who used to be the President of the United States of America. His name is George W. Bush."

The Urban Review states that it was originally inspired by the far-right British National Party, adding Allen now "feels the track is relevant everywhere now so has removed a particular target." At the 2009 Glastonbury Festival prior to performing the song, Allen made reference to the elections to the European parliament that had commenced three weeks earlier in which the British National Party gained their first ever representative seats, citing this as a reason to sing the song.

At the 2022 Glastonbury Festival, Olivia Rodrigo delivered a speech criticizing the United States Supreme Court's decision in Dobbs v. Jackson Women's Health Organization to overturn Roe v. Wade and allow states to ban abortion. She and Lily Allen, who has had four or five abortions, then dedicated a performance of "Fuck You" to the five justices who voted in the majority.

== Chart performance ==
The song made its chart debut at number 37 on the Canadian Top 100 on 28 February 2009 despite not being released as an actual single. The song also entered the US Billboard Hot 100 at number 68 on the same week, being her third song on entry.

In the United Kingdom, the song never received an official release.

In the Netherlands the song was released as the album's second single and debuted on the Dutch Top 40 on 18 April 2009 at number 23 and has peaked at number three. The song reached number one in Belgium on 6 June 2009. It also peaked at number four in Finland and Norway, number 18 in Sweden, number nine in France, number 23 in Australia and number 16 in Switzerland.

== Music video ==
A music video for the song was posted on the official Parlophone YouTube page on 15 June 2009. EMI hired the French production company Frenzy Paris, who in turn hired the art collective AB/CD/CD and the post-production company Firm. The video is shot from Allen's point of view (she can be seen using a Polaroid she takes of herself). She is seen to be making the journey from her hotel room to a television studio. Throughout the video, Allen warps the shape and size of her surroundings using her hands and her own perspective; for example, by moving her hands apart she stretches the Eiffel Tower and enlarges a man's afro hairstyle.

== Track listing ==
- CD single
1. "Fuck You" (Explicit) – 3:42
2. "The Fear" (The Count (aka Hervé) & Lily Face the Fear Remix) – 4:21
- French digital download
1. "Fuck You" (Explicit) – 3:42
2. "Why" – 3:16
3. "Not Fair" (Style of Eye Remix) – 6:19
4. "The Fear" (The Count (aka Hervé) & Lily Face the Fear Remix) – 4:21
5. "Not Fair" (radio edit) – 3:03
- US digital download
1. "Fuck You" (clean radio edit) – 3:41
2. "Fag Hag" – 2:55
3. "Kabul Shit" – 3:45
4. "Womanizer" (acoustic version) – 3:31

- US remix digital download
1. "Fuck You" (Ralphi Rosario & Craig J Klub) – 7:46
2. "Fuck You" (Manhattan Clique Two Fingers Club Mix) – 6:21
3. "Fuck You" (Rich Morel's Extended Vocal Mix) – 5:48
4. "Fuck You" (Manhattan Clique 'Now Watch This' Electropop Radio) – 3:32
5. "Fuck You" (Ralphi Rosario Dub) – 9:48
- US Promo CD - Remixes
1. "Fuck You" (Explicit) – 3:42
2. "Fuck You" (Ralphi Rosario & Craig J Klub)
3. "Fuck You" (Ralphi Rosario Dub)
4. "Fuck You" (Rich Morel's Extended Vocal Mix)
5. "Fuck You" (Rich Morel's Official Dub Mix)
6. "Fuck You" (Manhattan Clique Two Fingers Club Mix)
7. "Fuck You" (Manhattan Clique Dub Mix)
8. "Fuck You" (Ralphi Rosario & Craig J Mixshow)
9. "Fuck You" (The Boy's Crisis Remix)
10. "Fuck You" (Manhattan Clique "Now Watch This" Electropop Radio Edit)
11. "Fuck You" (Ralphi Rosario & Craig J Radio Mix)
12. "Fuck You" (Rich Morel's Radio Edit)

== Charts ==
=== Weekly charts ===
Weekly chart performance
Chart (2009)	Peak position
Australia (ARIA)	23
Austria (Ö3 Austria Top 40)	12
Belgium (Ultratop 50 Flanders)	1
Belgium (Ultratop 50 Wallonia)	2
Canada Hot 100 (Billboard)	37
Czech Republic (Rádio Top 100)	9
Europe (European Hot 100)	23
Finland Sales (Suomen virallinen singlelista)	4
France (SNEP)	14
Germany (GfK)	49
Israel (Media Forest)	6
Italy (FIMI)	9
Netherlands (Dutch Top 40)	3
Netherlands (Single Top 100)	2
Norway (VG-lista)	4
Slovakia (Rádio Top 100)	48
Sweden (Sverigetopplistan)	18
Switzerland (Schweizer Hitparade)	5
UK Singles (OCC)	104
US Billboard Hot 100	68
US Dance Club Songs (Billboard)	1

=== Year-end charts ===
Year-end chart performance
Chart (2009)	Position
Austria (Ö3 Austria Top 40)	66
Belgium (Ultratop 50 Flanders)	6
Belgium (Ultratop 50 Wallonia)	12
Europe (European Hot 100)	51
France (SNEP)	55
Netherlands (Dutch Top 40)	17
Netherlands (Single Top 100)	27
Italy (FIMI)	66
Sweden (Sverigetopplistan)	66
Switzerland (Schweizer Hitparade)	28

== Certifications ==
Certifications and sales
Region	Certification	Certified units/sales
Australia (ARIA)	Gold	35,000^{^}
Belgium (BRMA)	Gold	15,000^{*}
Denmark (IFPI Danmark)	Gold	45,000^{‡}
Finland (Musiikkituottajat)	Gold	5,153
France (SNEP)	Gold	150,000^{*}
Italy (FIMI)	Gold	10,000^{*}
New Zealand (RMNZ)	Platinum	30,000^{‡}
Switzerland (IFPI Switzerland)	Gold	15,000^{^}
United Kingdom (BPI)	Platinum	813,000
^{*} Sales figures based on certification alone.^{^} Shipments figures based on certification alone.^{‡} Sales+streaming figures based on certification alone.

== In popular culture ==
The song was chosen as the theme song for the TV programme Periodismo para todos (Spanish: Journalism for Everyone) in Argentina. Periodismo para todos is a controversial Argentine television program that has been labelled as investigative journalism. The song was chosen because it had been used in a telenovela of the state-owned TV Pública, in a satirical Spanish lyrics version. The opening of the show features photos of the audience making the "fuck you" sign. The song has a medium rotation on radio stations like La 100, from Buenos Aires (owned by Grupo Clarín, which also belongs Canal 13 who broadcast Periodismo para todos weekly). However, it was the second most popular song of 2012 in the chart show TUS 25 (Spanish: Your 25) of Tu Dial, an Argentinian web radio station based in Mexico.

The song was featured in the pilot of ABC's Suburgatory.

The song was performed by The Sockapellas in the 2012 film Pitch Perfect, singing "Eff You" instead.

The song is featured in the 2014 film Love, Rosie and in the 2016 film Bridget Jones's Baby.

Finnish actor Antti Holma covered the song in Finnish in 2016, with the title "V-laulu" ("The V Song").

The song is prominently featured in "Chapter 3: Resurrection", the 2018 third episode of the animated web series The Vampair by Daria Cohen, in which it is presented as being sung by Melissa "Missi" Dumarias to Duke on resurrecting him and kicking him out of his former castle.

The song is featured in the 2020 video game Watch Dogs: Legion.

The song is performed by the character Janae in the 2021 series, One of Us Is Lying (adaptation of the bestselling Karen M McManus book).

On 25 June 2022, Allen performed the song with Olivia Rodrigo at Glastonbury Festival 2022. They dedicated the song to the five conservative U.S. Supreme Court justices—Samuel Alito, Clarence Thomas, Amy Coney Barrett, Neil Gorsuch, and Brett Kavanaugh—who formed the majority in Dobbs v. Jackson Women's Health Organization to overturn Roe v. Wade the day before, ending the right to an abortion under the U.S. constitution.
