= The Fear (Lily Allen song) =

2008 single by Lily Allen

Single by Lily Allen

from the album It's Not Me, It's You
- B-side: "Fag Hag"; "Kabul Shit"
- Released: 9 December 2008
- Recorded: 2007
- Studio: Home studio (Moreton-in-Marsh, Gloucestershire, England)
- Genre: Electropop
- Length: 3:27
- Label: Regal
- Songwriters: Lily Allen; Greg Kurstin
- Producer: Greg Kurstin

Lily Allen singles chronology
"Drivin' Me Wild" (2007)	"The Fear" (2008)	"Not Fair" (2009)

Music video
- "The Fear" on YouTube

"The Fear" is a song by English singer Lily Allen, released in December 2008 as the lead single from her second studio album, It's Not Me, It's You (2009). It was written by Allen and Greg Kurstin, and produced by the latter. Initially, "Everyone's at It" was announced to be the first single from the album. However, it was ultimately decided on "The Fear" to be released on 26 January 2009 by Regal Recordings, while Allen posted the demo (which was then titled "I Don't Know") onto her Myspace account in April 2008. The song incorporates electropop music as the lyrics articulate problems with celebrity lifestyles and include metaphors for recognised tabloid national newspapers such as The Sun and the Daily Mirror.

Contemporary critics complimented the song and its themes of consumerism and the postmodern condition. "The Fear" topped the UK Singles Chart for four consecutive weeks, thus becoming the longest running number one in the UK of 2009, while peaking inside the top 10 in Australia and Ireland and the top 20 in several European countries. It is also Allen's second entry on the Billboard Hot 100 in the United States, where it reached number 80.

The accompanying music video portrayed a fantasy theme, with Allen dancing with giant wrapped gifts and balloons. It was shot at Wrest Park in Bedfordshire and also featured dancers dressed as butlers; the locations were initially in a caravan in a park, and then in a giant colourful mansion, surrounded by contrasting grey clouds. The song was performed live for the first time via The Scott Mills Show on BBC Radio 1 and during Allen's 2009 concert tour. "The Fear" was awarded with the Best Track prize at the 2009 Q Awards, and also won Allen two Ivor Novello Awards in 2010, for Best Song Musically and Lyrically, and Most Performed Work.

== Background and composition ==
Allen wrote and recorded the song with Greg Kurstin in a cottage located in Moreton-in-Marsh in 2007. She released a demo version of the song, which was then called "I Don't Know", onto her Myspace account, along with another song, "I Could Say", in April 2008. Initially, the song "Everyone's at It" was announced to be released as the lead single from the album, but it was ultimately decided on "The Fear". While discussing It's Not Me, It's You, Allen stated that her intention was to make "bigger sounding, more ethereal songs, real songs. [...] I think I've grown up a bit as a person and I hope it reflects that." The singer declared about the inspiration for the song, which has to do with materialism and the pressures of being rich and famous:

[I'll] tell you where the inspiration for it came from. I was walking down this street, in this village in the middle of the countryside in the U.K., and there was this little girl who must have been eight or nine, walking down the street with her mum in, like, high-waisted hot pants and a little crop top. And I just thought, 'That's not really right.' And I could tell she was the kind of girl that would be trying out for Pop Idol in five years time, and wants to be famous when she grows up. And there's definitely the whole culture of that where I come from, and it's not necessarily a culture that I think is particularly healthy. But at the same time, I'm very aware that I am a part of that culture – but it's not something that I feel particularly comfortable with.

"The Fear"
A 30-second sample of "The Fear", in which Allen sings the chorus.

Musically, Allen adopts a more mature electropop groove for the song, which has been described to have "a pulsing, sleekly modern electro dance backing", while coming through a "flood of soft synths" and being "eminently danceable and slightly trancey". It is set in common time and in the key of F major and has a tempo of 134 beats per minute. Allen's voice spans from F_{3} to A_{4}. Lyrically, the song is a satire of materialism "sung in the voice of a would-be starlet", and tackles societal consumerism and overnight-fame-hunting. It also makes reference, through the line "I'll look at The Sun and I'll look in The Mirror", at the daily British tabloid national newspapers The Sun and Daily Mirror, which often report on Allen. The synthesiser parts were written by Greg Kurstin using Apple's Logic Studio, using its built-in instruments.

== Critical reception ==
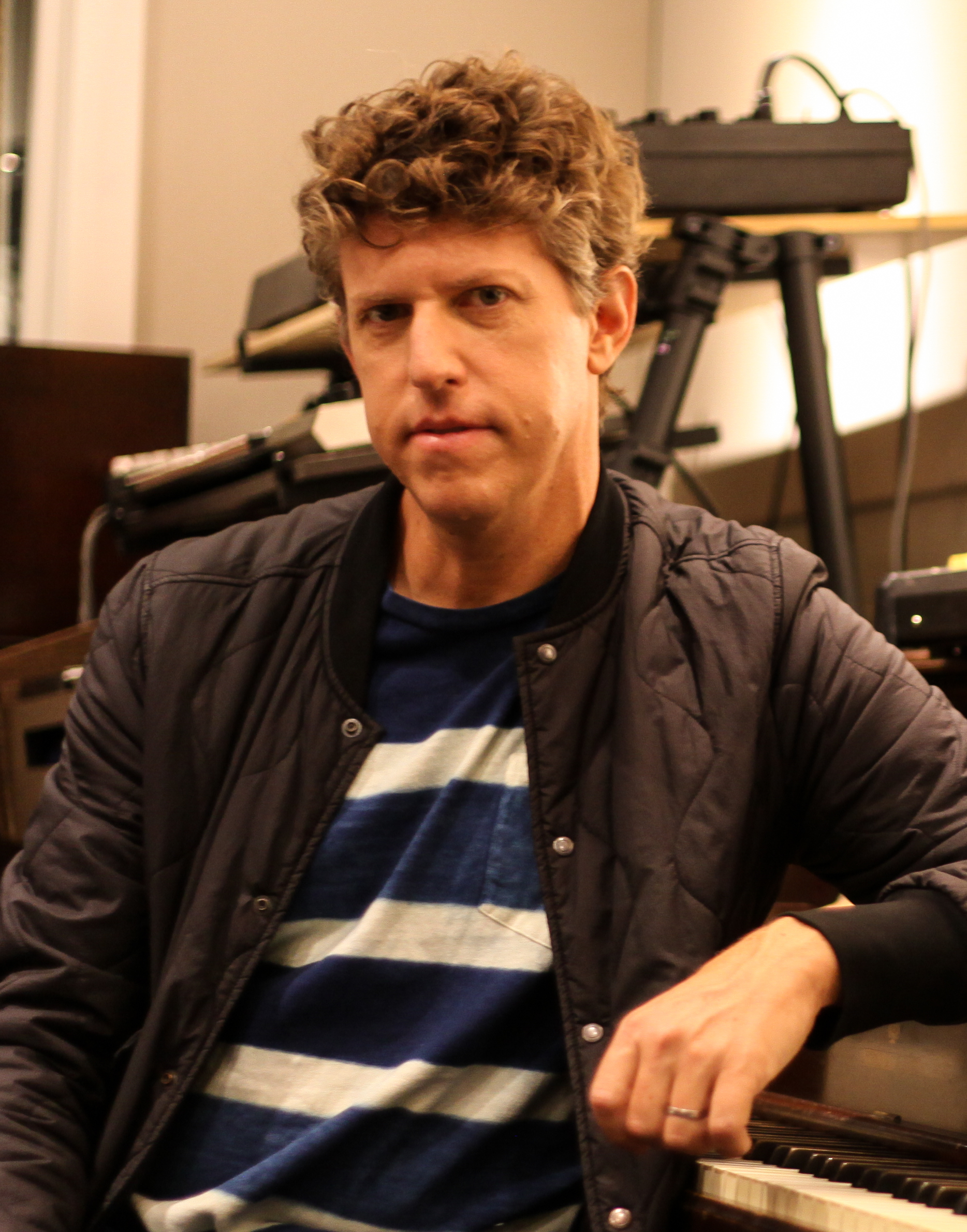
Kurstin produced and co-wrote the song with Allen

"The Fear" received critical acclaim from music critics, who praised the song's themes of consumerism and the postmodern condition, as well as Allen's vocals. Michael Menachem from Billboard commented on the song, saying it "packs another lyrical punch", while complimenting Allen's vocals. Lucy Davies of the BBC described the song as "[e]minently danceable and slightly trancey". Neil McCormick from The Daily Telegraph suggested that the song confirms that the singer's "pithy observational skills and sweet musicality" remain intact, as she has been a bit bruised by her encounter with 21st-century fame. Clash reporter Natasha Arico concluded that "The Fear" is somewhat trite, though "sickeningly catchy and dance friendly", while Rolling Stone magazine criticised the song for being a "cliché" delivered by Allen "with sneer". James Montgomery of MTV gave a good review, saying it is a relatively scathing indictment of today's glossy, "celeb-ified culture". Ryan Dombal from Pitchfork Media described the song to have a "part admission, part brag, part apocalyptic vision" and suggested that "for almost any other artist, the lines would be barbed, sarcastic, and, ultimately, uppity and bland indictments. But not for the loudmouth [Allen]".

Other reviews were also positive; Sal Cinquemani from Slant Magazine suggested that "The Fear" is proof of the pop singer's self-awareness, but, given her own personal tabloid history, the song possesses a trail of irony: "I'll look at The Sun and I'll look in The Mirror/I'm on the right track, yeah, we're onto a winner." Leah Greenblatt of Entertainment Weekly liked the song, in which Allen makes fun of her own material-girl ID and went on to say that it is in fact "a tale of two Lilys: the naughty postadolescent in the rearview mirror, and the fully realized female coming around the bend." Chris Buckle from The Skinny gave "The Fear" three stars, commenting that it "is a potent reminder that she's more than just gobby gossip-fodder", but also disliked a few lyrics, which "in particular [are] a clumsy attempt to inject politics amongst the celeb-woe naval-gazing", while About.com praised the song for being a "pop masterpiece", Allen's "witty intelligent lyrics" and compared it to Pink's "Stupid Girls".

== Commercial performance ==
"The Fear" debuted at number 168 on the UK Singles Chart on 25 January 2009―for the week ending dated 31 January 2009. The following week, the song climbed 167 places to the top of the chart, thwarting Lady Gaga's "Just Dance" from the summit. Gaga commented on this, saying, "I'm very familiar with Lily's music and good job Lily for knocking me off. There always deserves to be a female on top and I don't want to be the only one to do it. I think generally that pop music is making an enormous comeback and I'm actually very pleased with Lily Allen's new record as it's decidedly pop". The song managed to remain on top for four weeks, throughout the whole of February, until it was dethroned by Kelly Clarkson's "My Life Would Suck Without You". It thus earned Allen's second chart-topper, since her debut single, "Smile", achieved the feat in July 2006. "The Fear" was the UK's longest-running number one single of 2009. On the single's third week stay at number one, its parent album, It's Not Me, It's You topped the UK Albums Chart, having a chart double, to which Allen said: "It's great being at the top of both charts, especially in the same week as the Brit Awards are once again celebrating the best of British music."

The song shared similar success in Australia, where it peaked at number three on the ARIA Singles Chart and stayed eight consecutive weeks in the top 10, and was certified Platinum by the Australian Recording Industry Association. In Ireland, "The Fear" entered at number 29 on the Irish Singles Chart, making a slow rise to number five, where it remained for one week after descending the chart. The song became a success in Europe, having entered the top 20 in most of its countries, which resulted in a peak of number three on the European Hot 100 Singles chart. Also, in New Zealand, Allen scored her fourth top 40 entry with the song placing itself at a peak of number 14 on the New Zealand Singles Chart.

In North America, "The Fear" shared moderate success, charting at number 80 on the Billboard Hot 100, making it Allen's only second entry in the United States. Despite low positions on the main chart, the single managed to become the singer's first Hot Dance Club Play number one, topping it for one week. In Canada, it debuted at 57 in late 2008, afterwards leaving the chart for seven weeks; it returned in 2009, peaking at 33. It was certified Gold by the Canadian Recording Industry Association (CRIA) for shipments of over 20,000 copies.

== Music video ==
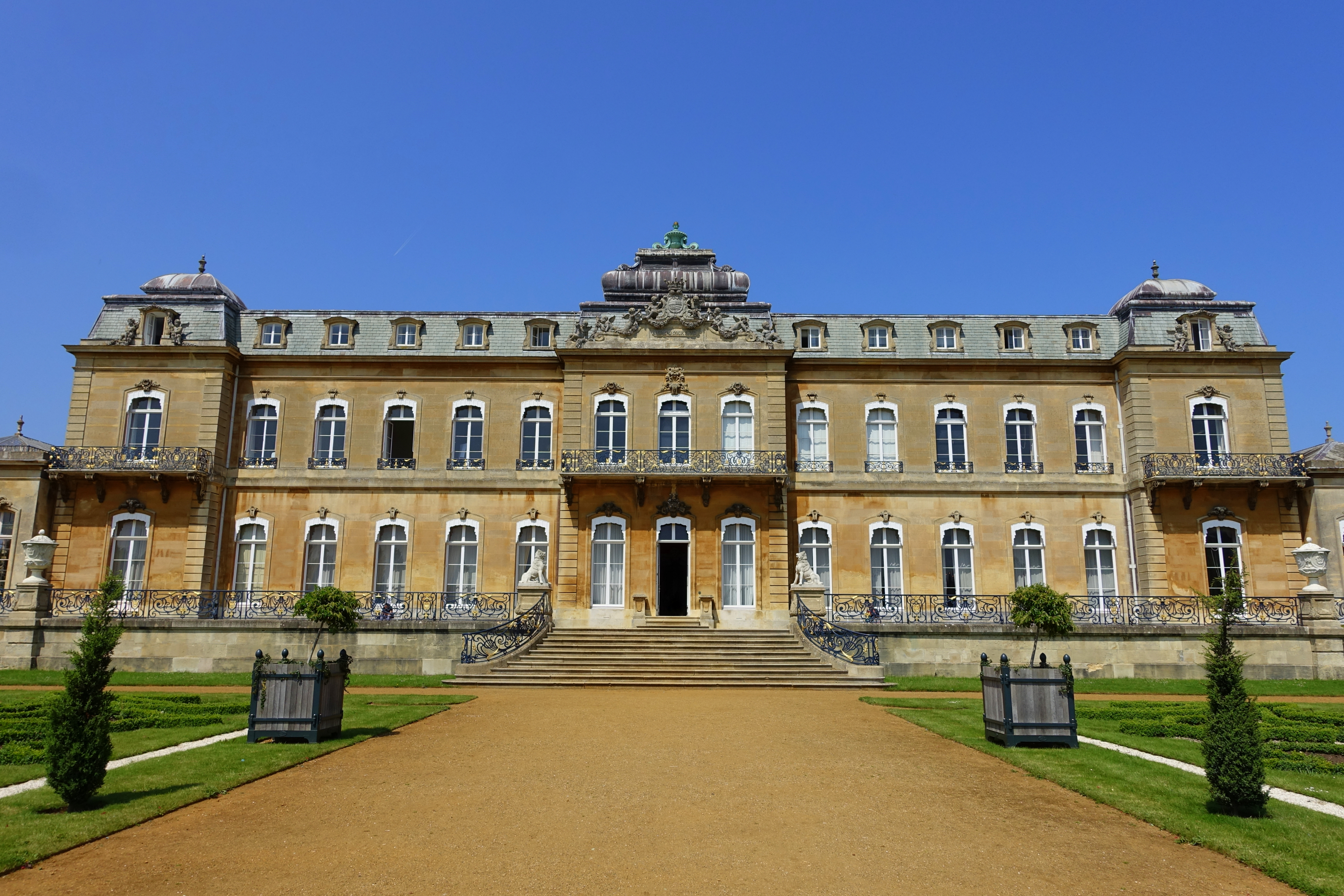
The music video was shot at Wrest Park in Bedfordshire

On 14 October 2008, Allen announced on her MySpace account that she had started filming a music video for "Everyone's at It", however, filming for the video was shelved when it was decided that "The Fear" would be released instead. The music video was principally shot on 18 November 2008 at Wrest Park in Bedfordshire and directed by Nez. It premiered on Channel 4 on Thursday, 4 December 2008 at 11:40pm, however, the video was leaked on to YouTube a few hours before the official premiere, receiving over 200 views before it premiered.

The video begins with Allen singing from a caravan window, while a clothes line on the right has underwear and a teddybear hanging from it. As she exits, her clothes are revealed to be a smock dress with a big bow and high heels; upon returning through the caravan door, the interior changes to that of a luxurious mansion, in reality an English country estate. The chorus starts and she walks down the hall, surrounded by butlers, all making synchronised moves and starting a choreography with Allen. Afterwards, she climbs the stairs and the camera cuts to the next scene, where she is sitting down in front of the mirror in an extravagant bedroom, with dresses, lamps, toys and cupcakes. The scene changes once again, with Allen walking into a room with giant, brightly coloured presents. They suddenly stand up, having two human legs, and begin to spin around, with the singer joining them.

After descending the stairs and walking through the same hall she entered, she exits the estate, and the video takes down a darker, more serious tone, while the verse "Forget about guns and forget ammunition/'Cause I'm killing them all on my own little mission/Now I'm not a saint but I'm not a sinner/Now everything is cool as long as I'm getting thinner" is sung. The euphoric visual effects appear once again soon after, as the chorus takes place. Allen walks down the estate stairs, being surrounded by dancing balloons, hopping butlers and coloured fog. The camera zooms out showing the estate tied in a giant ribbon, but also grey, melancholic clouds, which contrast the cheerful party from before. Allen stated that she hoped the music video would convey parts of the song's sarcasm.

The video reportedly cost £50,000. During the shoot, the video was documented on the MTV show Making the Video; in which Allen stated:

I wanted to do a dance routine, even though I'm not really doing a dance routine, other people are doing it, but I'm part of it. I think people are quite used to girls in this industry really being able to move in front of the camera, but I'm just rubbish at that kind of thing. I find it quite nerve-racking performing, actually. Because when you write songs, you don't really think about performing in a video. I think it's quite fun. Lots of colour and dancing, and it's about doing something that's in keeping with the song, actually.

== Live performances ==
While being invited to the BBC show hosted by Scott Mills, Allen talked about her struggles with the paparazzi and also premiered the song by performing it live. Other live performances of the song include the Sound on BBC 2 with Nick Grimshaw and Annie Mac, Friday Night with Jonathan Ross, the Orange unsignedAct, and The Sunday Night Project. In February 2009, she was invited at The Today Show with Matt Lauer, where she performed the song after an interview. The same month, she made an appearance on The Ellen DeGeneres Show, and while she was singing, DeGeneres freely dispensed copies of It's Not Me, It's You to the audience. Afterwards, both Allen and DeGeneres performed a rendition of the song "Womanizer" by American singer Britney Spears. Allen included the song on her 2009 concert tour setlist, as part of the encore. "The Fear" was also performed at the 2010 BRIT Awards, as the opening song. Allen arrived on stage sitting on a rocket hoisted in the air, while wearing a black corset dress. She was later joined on stage by paratroopers dressed in pink military camouflage and women with Silver Cross prams.

== Media appearances ==
The song was featured in the fourth episode of series three of the TV drama Skins, and, also, an instrumental version is used as accompanying music by Match of the Day 2 during the review segment showing the goals. "The Fear" was parodied by the character playing Kevin Rudd on the TV show Double Take, in which the lyrics are altered to deal with the voting campaign for Prime Minister in Australia. The song was covered by JLS for BBC Radio 1's "Live Lounge" segment of Jo Whiley's show on 15 September 2009, featuring an interpolation of the Beyoncé's "Halo". In the 2021 Channel 4 film Help, the main character Sarah (played by Jodie Comer) quotes the song.

== Credits and personnel ==
Credits adapted from the liner notes of It's Not Me, It's You.

- Lily Allen – vocals, songwriting
- Greg Kurstin – bass, engineering, guitar, keyboards, mixing, production, programming, songwriting
- Geoff Pesche – mastering

== Charts ==
=== Weekly charts ===
Weekly chart performance for "The Fear"
Chart (2008–2009)	Peak position
Australia (ARIA)	3
Austria (Ö3 Austria Top 40)	20
Belgium (Ultratop 50 Flanders)	6
Belgium (Ultratop 50 Wallonia)	5
Canada Hot 100 (Billboard)	33
CIS Airplay (TopHit)	96
Croatia International Airplay (HRT)	3
Czech Republic Airplay (ČNS IFPI)	19
Denmark (Tracklisten)	20
Europe (European Hot 100 Singles)	3
Finland Airplay (Suomen virallinen radiosoittolista)	8
Finland Sales (Suomen virallinen singlelista)	14
France (SNEP)	15
Germany (GfK)	12
Germany Airplay (BVMI)	2
Hungary (Rádiós Top 40)	12
Ireland (IRMA)	5
Israel International Airplay (Media Forest)	1
Netherlands (Dutch Top 40)	29
Netherlands (Single Top 100)	40
New Zealand (Recorded Music NZ)	14
Scottish Singles Sales (Official Charts)	2
Slovakia Airplay (ČNS IFPI)	7
Sweden (Sverigetopplistan)	30
Switzerland (Schweizer Hitparade)	14
UK Singles (Official Charts)	1
US Billboard Hot 100	80
US Adult Alternative Airplay (Billboard)	17
US Adult Pop Airplay (Billboard)	16
US Dance Club Songs (Billboard)	1
US Pop Airplay (Billboard)	39
US Pop 100 (Billboard)	54
Venezuela Pop Rock (Record Report)	5

=== Year-end charts ===
Year-end chart performance for "The Fear"
Chart (2009)	Position
Australia (ARIA)	22
Belgium (Ultratop 50 Flanders)	21
Belgium (Ultratop 50 Wallonia)	26
Croatia International Airplay (HRT)	4
Europe (European Hot 100 Singles)	58
Germany (Media Control GfK)	79
Hungary (Rádiós Top 40)	50
Japan (Japan Hot 100)	67
Japan Adult Contemporary (Billboard)	19
Switzerland (Schweizer Hitparade)	75
Taiwan (Yearly Singles Top 100)	74
UK Singles (OCC)	14
US Dance Club Songs (Billboard)	4

=== Decade-end charts ===
Decade-end chart performance for "The Fear"
Chart (2000–2009)	Position
Australia (ARIA)	96

== Certifications ==
Certifications and sales for "The Fear"
Region	Certification	Certified units/sales
Australia (ARIA)	Platinum	70,000^{^}
Canada (Music Canada)	Gold	20,000^{*}
New Zealand (RMNZ)	Gold	7,500^{*}
United Kingdom (BPI)	2× Platinum	1,200,000^{‡}
^{*} Sales figures based on certification alone.^{^} Shipments figures based on certification alone.^{‡} Sales+streaming figures based on certification alone.

== Release history ==
Release dates and formats for "The Fear"
Region	Date	Format	Label(s)	Ref.
United States	10 February 2009	Mainstream airplay	Capitol	
