= Regal Recordings =

British record label established 1995; imprint of Parlophone Records

- Parent company: Warner Music Group
- Founded: 1914; 1932 (as Regal Zonophone); 1995 (current relaunch)
- Distributor(s): Parlophone (United Kingdom); Warner Records (United States); WEA International Inc. (world); Rhino Entertainment (reissues)
- Country of origin: United Kingdom
- Location: London

Regal Recordings is a British record label functioning as an imprint of Parlophone Records.

== Background ==
Regal Records was a British record label founded in 1913 as a subsidiary of the UK branch of Columbia Records, known as the Columbia Graphophone Company.

The first record issues on the Regal Record label in February 1914 were re-issues of existing records from the Columbia Record Catalogue: G-6105 to G-6559, G-6440, G 6441 (English Catalogue) and G 6560 to G 6639 (Scottish Catalogue). Catalogue numbers starting from G 6000 were used at later dates.

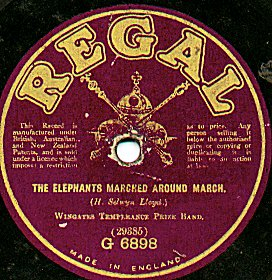
Early UK Regal record, issued prior to the mid-1920s

In November 1921, 12 inch records were introduced, commencing at catalogue number G-1000.

From around 1923 onwards many earlier recordings were re-recorded acoustically and released under the same catalogue number as the originals. For catalogue numbers below G-7963 (released July 1923) these may usually be identified by a matrix commencing with an 'A', rather than being completely numeric.

Former logo

The Western Electric electrical process of recording was introduced in February 1926. Those records re-recorded using this process invariably have their catalogue number suffixed by 'R'.

From March 1930, all new releases were prefixed in the catalogue by 'MR', commencing at MR1.

In 1932, it was merged with the British Zonophone label and became Regal Zonophone, following the merger of those labels' respective parent companies, the Columbia Graphophone Company and the Gramophone Company, to form EMI. A listing of records produced by Regal in this era is available from the CLPGS.

== Regal today ==
In 1995, the Regal label was revived by EMI as the Parlophone imprint Regal Recordings. Following the 2013 acquisition of Parlophone by the Warner Music Group, Regal became part of Warner’s portfolio.

In 2025, Regal Records relaunched as an independent label and music distribution specialist, focused on supporting cutting-edge and emerging artists. The first two signings under the new era of Regal are Kilu and Josephine Illingworth.

== See also ==
- Parlophone
- Regal Zonophone Records
- Columbia Graphophone Company
- Zon-O-Phone Records
