= Lily Allen discography =

Discography of English singer-songwriter Lily Allen

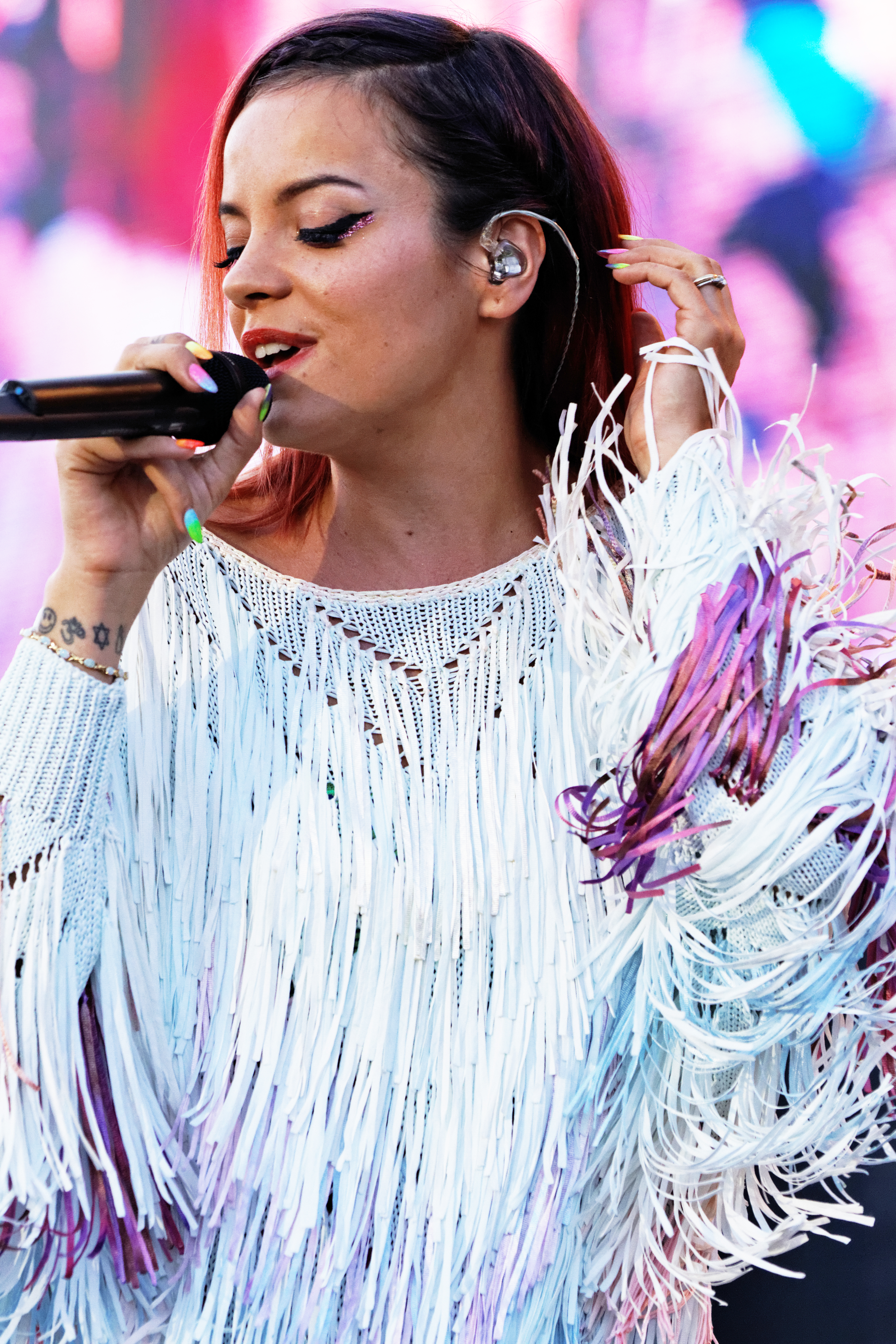
- Allen performing at the 2014 Vieilles Charrues Festival
- Studio albums: 5
- Extended plays: 4
- Singles: 31
- Music videos: 21
- Promotional singles: 7

English singer and songwriter Lily Allen has released five studio albums, four extended plays, 31 singles (including thirteen as a featured artist), seven promotional singles and 21 music videos. Allen's range of musical genres incorporates styles such as pop, ska, electropop and reggae fusion. She became well known through her Myspace account, on which she started posting demo songs in 2005. The increase of popularity led to a contract with Regal Recordings. Her debut single, "Smile", was released in 2006 and topped the UK Singles Chart for two weeks. Allen's first studio album, Alright, Still (2006), was released shortly after. The album was commercially successful, earning a three times platinum certification in the United Kingdom, and gold in the United States. The album was nominated for Best Alternative Music Album at the 50th Grammy Awards. Follow-up singles "LDN", "Littlest Things" and "Alfie" did not repeat her early success, although they still sold well; "LDN" peaked at number six on the UK Singles Chart.

Released in 2009, Allen's second major release, It's Not Me, It's You, saw a genre shift for her, having more of an electropop feel, rather than the ska and reggae influences of the first one. The album debuted at number one on the UK Albums Chart, the Australian Albums Chart and the Canadian Albums Chart. The first single from it, "The Fear", also debuted at number one on the UK Singles Chart, where it remained for four consecutive weeks. Other singles include "Not Fair", another top 10 single in the UK, "Fuck You", which became her third chart entry on the US Billboard Hot 100, peaking at 68, followed by, "22" and "Who'd Have Known". Allen's first extended play, F.U.E.P., were released in March 2009 and her second, Paris Live Session, in November of the same year.

In May 2014, after a five-year hiatus from music, she released her third album, Sheezus, which contains a diverse mix of genres, including bubblegum pop and synth-pop. It debuted at number one on the UK Albums Chart, being Allen's second consecutive number one in the UK, and entered the top five on the Australian Albums Chart and the Irish Albums Chart. It also peaked at number 12 on the Billboard 200. Its lead single, "Hard out Here", was released on 17 November 2013 and peaked at number nine on the UK Singles Chart, giving Allen two simultaneous top 10 singles, along with "Somewhere Only We Know", which stayed at number one for three non-consecutive weeks. The second single, "Air Balloon", was released on 20 January 2014, and reached number seven on the UK Singles Chart. Other released singles were "Our Time", "URL Badman" and "As Long as I Got You".

Allen's fourth album No Shame was released in June 2018. In addition to electropop, the album utilises elements of dancehall and reggae. No Shame reached number eight on the UK Albums Chart and Australian Albums Chart. The song "Trigger Bang" was promoted as a single from the record.

== Studio albums ==
List of studio albums, with selected chart positions, sales figures and certifications
Title	Details	Peak chart positions										Sales	Certifications
Title	Details	UK	AUS	BEL (FL)	CAN	FRA	IRL	NLD	NZ	SWI	US	Sales	Certifications
Alright, Still	Released: 13 July 2006; Label: Regal; Formats: CD, LP, digital download	2	7	24	21	47	6	27	22	53	20	UK: 1,210,017 (Note: Sales as of October 2025); US: 627,000 (Note: Sales as of November 2013)	BPI: 4× Platinum; ARIA: Platinum; IRMA: Platinum; MC: Gold; RIAA: Gold; RMNZ: Platinum; SNEP: Silver
It's Not Me, It's You	Released: 4 February 2009; Label: Regal, Parlophone; Formats: CD, LP, digital download	1	1	5	1	11	3	17	9	6	5	UK: 1,242,106 (Note: Sales as of October 2025); US: 353,000 (Note: Sales as of November 2013)	BPI: 4× Platinum; ARIA: 4× Platinum; BRMA: Platinum; IFPI SWI: Gold; IRMA: 2× Platinum; MC: Gold; RMNZ: Platinum; SNEP: Platinum
Sheezus	Released: 2 May 2014; Label: Regal, Parlophone; Formats: CD, LP, digital download	1	4	31	16	32	4	26	9	16	12	UK: 113,054 (Note: Sales as of June 2018)	BPI: Gold; RMNZ: Gold
No Shame	Released: 8 June 2018; Label: Parlophone; Formats: CD, LP, digital download	8	8	41	—	138	20	68	40	26	168	UK: 47,668 (Note: Sales as of October 2025)	
West End Girl	Released: 24 October 2025; Label: BMG; Formats: CD, LP, digital download, USB	2	6	5	45	143	4	34	5	14	93		BPI: Gold
"—" denotes a recording that did not chart or was not released in that territory.

== Extended plays ==
Title	Details
F.U.E.P.	Released: 31 March 2009; Label: Capitol; Format: Digital download
Paris Live Session	Released: 24 November 2009; Label: Regal; Format: Digital download
Spotify Sessions	Released: 28 April 2014; Label: Regal; Format: Digital download
Spotify Singles	Released: 26 September 2018; Label: Regal; Format: Digital download

== Singles ==
=== As lead artist ===
List of singles as lead artist, with selected chart positions and certifications, showing year released and album name
Title	Year	Peak chart positions										Certifications	Album
Title	Year	UK	AUS	BEL (FL)	FRA	GER	IRL	NLD	NZ	SWI	US	Certifications	Album
"Smile"	2006	1	14	27	16	67	6	19	6	21	49	BPI: 3× Platinum; RIAA: Gold; RMNZ: 2× Platinum	Alright, Still
"LDN"	2006	6	39	— (Note: "LDN" did not enter the Ultratop 50, but peaked at number two on the Flemish Ultratip chart.)	—	—	21	—	23	88	—	BPI: Platinum; RMNZ: Platinum	Alright, Still
"Littlest Things"	2006	21	—	— (Note: "Littlest Things" did not enter the Ultratop 50, but peaked at number 13 on the Flemish Ultratip chart.)	—	—	—	—	—	—	—		Alright, Still
"Alfie"	2007	15 (Note: "Alfie" charted as a double A-side single with "Shame for You" in the United Kingdom.)	—	—	—	—	31	—	15	—	—	BPI: Silver	Alright, Still
"Shame for You"	2007	15	—	—	—	—	—	—	—	—	—	BPI: Silver	Alright, Still
"The Fear"	2008	1	3	5	15	12	5	40	14	14	80	BPI: 2× Platinum; ARIA: Platinum; MC: Gold; RMNZ: Gold	It's Not Me, It's You
"Not Fair"	2009	5	3	12	—	12	3	9	20	6	—	BPI: 2× Platinum; ARIA: Platinum; BVMI: Gold; IFPI SWI: Gold; RMNZ: Platinum	It's Not Me, It's You
"Fuck You"	2009	104	23	1	14	49	—	2	—	5	68	BPI: Platinum; ARIA: Gold; BRMA: Gold; IFPI SWI: Gold; RMNZ: Platinum; SNEP: Gold	It's Not Me, It's You
"22"	2009	14	12	34	23	85	12	79	28	71	—	BPI: Silver; ARIA: Gold	It's Not Me, It's You
"Who'd Have Known"	2009	39	54	—	—	—	—	—	—	—	—		It's Not Me, It's You
"Somewhere Only We Know"	2013	1	—	— (Note: "Somewhere Only We Know" did not enter the Ultratop 50, but peaked at number 12 on the Flemish Ultratip chart.)	6	—	1	—	—	52	—	BPI: 3× Platinum; RMNZ: Platinum	Sheezus
"Hard out Here"	2013	9	14	24	78	2	21	58	14	6	— (Note: "Hard out Here" did not enter the Billboard Hot 100, but peaked at number six on the Bubbling Under Hot 100 Singles chart.)	BPI: Silver; ARIA: Platinum; BVMI: Gold; RMNZ: Gold	Sheezus
"Air Balloon"	2014	7	15	— (Note: "Air Balloon" did not enter the Ultratop 50, but peaked at number six on the Flemish Ultratip chart.)	—	40	8	—	30	65	—	BPI: Silver; ARIA: Gold	Sheezus
"Our Time"	2014	43	60	—	—	—	—	—	—	—	—		Sheezus
"URL Badman"	2014	93	—	—	—	—	—	—	—	—	—		Sheezus
"As Long as I Got You"	2014	—	45	—	—	—	—	—	—	—	—		Sheezus
"Trigger Bang" (featuring Giggs)	2017	—	—	— (Note: "Trigger Bang" did not enter the Ultratop 50, but peaked at number 26 on the Flemish Ultratip chart.)	—	—	—	—	—	—	—		No Shame
"Madeline"	2025	16	98	—	—	—	26	—	— (Note: "Madeline" did not enter the NZ Top 40 Singles Chart, but peaked at number 5 on the NZ Hot 40 Singles Chart.)	—	—		West End Girl
"—" denotes a recording that did not chart or was not released in that territory.

=== As featured artist ===
List of singles as featured artist, with selected chart positions and certifications, showing year released and album name
Title	Year	Peak chart positions										Certifications	Album
Title	Year	UK	AUS	BEL (FL)	CAN	FRA	GER	IRL	NLD	NZ	US	Certifications	Album
"Who Invented Fish & Chips?" (additional vocals for Fat Les)	2002	86	—	—	—	—	—	—	—	—	—		None
"Oh My God" (Mark Ronson featuring Lily Allen)	2007	8	72	19	—	—	—	21	—	—	—	BPI: Silver	Version
"Drivin' Me Wild" (Common featuring Lily Allen)	2007	56	—	—	—	—	—	—	—	—	—		Finding Forever
"Beds Are Burning" (with various artists)	2009	—	—	—	—	—	—	—	—	—	—		Non-album single
"Just Be Good to Green" (Professor Green featuring Lily Allen)	2010	5	49	—	—	—	—	17	95	32	—	BPI: Gold	Alive Till I'm Dead
"5 O'Clock" (T-Pain featuring Wiz Khalifa and Lily Allen)	2011	6	29	5	15	90	91	—	—	27	10	BPI: Silver; ARIA: Gold; MC: Platinum	Revolver
"True Love" (Pink featuring Lily Allen)	2013	16	5	3	20	52	43	23	57	14	53	BPI: Gold; ARIA: 4× Platinum; MC: Platinum; RMNZ: Platinum	The Truth About Love
"Cigarettes & Cush" (Stormzy featuring Kehlani and Lily Allen)	2017	30	—	—	—	—	—	—	—	—	—	BPI: Gold	Gang Signs & Prayer
"Heaven's Gate" (Burna Boy featuring Lily Allen)	2018	—	—	—	—	—	—	—	—	—	—		Outside
"Roll the Dice" (Shy FX featuring Stamina MC and Lily Allen)	2018	—	—	—	—	—	—	—	—	—	—	BPI: Platinum; RMNZ: Platinum	Raggamuffin SoundTape
"1%" (Oscar Scheller featuring Lily Allen)	2019	—	—	—	—	—	—	—	—	—	—		HTTP404
"Sweet Like Chocolate" (DJ Spoony featuring Lily Allen)	2019	—	—	—	—	—	—	—	—	—	—		Garage Classical
"Plain" (Benee featuring Lily Allen and Flo Milli)	2020	—	—	—	—	—	—	—	—	— (Note: "Plain" did not enter the Official New Zealand Music Chart, but peaked at number 13 on the Hot 40 Singles chart.)	—		Hey U X
"—" denotes a recording that did not chart or was not released in that territory.

=== Promotional singles ===
List of promotional singles, with selected chart positions, showing year released and album name
Title	Year	Peak chart positions	Album
Title	Year	UK	Album
"The Fear (The People vs. Lily Allen)"	2010	—	It's Not Me, It's You
"Back to the Start" (Note: "Back to the Start" was released as a limited-edition seven-inch vinyl single for Record Store Day 2010.)	2010	—	It's Not Me, It's You
"Sheezus"	2014	113	Sheezus
"Bass Like Home"	2014	—	Non-album single
"Higher"	2018	—	No Shame
"Three"	2018	—	No Shame
"Lost My Mind"	2018	—	No Shame
"Family Man / Mad World"	2018	—	Non-album single
"What You Waiting For?" (Remix) (featuring Popcaan)	2019	—	No Shame
"—" denotes a recording that did not chart or was not released in that territory.

== Other charted songs ==
List of other charted songs, with selected chart positions, showing year released and album name
Title	Year	Peak chart positions								Album
Title	Year	UK	AUS	BEL (FL)	FRA	GER	IRL	NZ Hot	SWI	Album
"Cheryl Tweedy"	2006	153	—	—	—	—	—	—	—	Alright, Still
"Absolutely Nothing"	2006	136	—	—	—	—	—	—	—	Alright, Still
"Everyone's at It"	2009	117	—	—	—	—	—	—	—	It's Not Me, It's You
"Dream a Little Dream" (Robbie Williams featuring Lily Allen)	2013	144	—	— (Note: "Dream a Little Dream" did not enter the Ultratop 50, but peaked at number 16 on the Flemish Ultratip chart.)	160	88	—	—	67	Swings Both Ways
"L8 CMMR"	2014	—	—	— (Note: "L8 CMMR" did not enter the Ultratop 50, but peaked at number 4 on the Flemish Ultratip chart.)	—	—	—	—	—	Sheezus
"West End Girl"	2025	15	90	—	—	—	24	4	—	West End Girl
"Ruminating"	2025	— (Note: "Ruminating" did not enter the UK Singles Chart, but peaked at number 6 on the UK Independent Singles Chart and number 56 on the UK Streaming Chart.)	—	—	—	—	—	—	—	West End Girl
"Sleepwalking"	2025	— (Note: "Sleepwalking" did not enter the UK Singles Chart, but peaked at number 6 on the UK Independent Singles Chart and number 51 on the UK Streaming Chart.)	—	—	—	—	—	—	—	West End Girl
"Tennis"	2025	76	—	—	—	—	38	7	—	West End Girl
"Relapse"	2025	— (Note: "Relapse" did not enter the UK Singles Chart, but peaked at number 8 on the UK Independent Singles Chart and number 74 on the UK Streaming Chart.)	—	—	—	—	—	—	—	West End Girl
"Pussy Palace"	2025	8	50	43	—	—	9	1	—	West End Girl
"4chan Stan"	2025	— (Note: "4chan Stan" did not enter the UK Singles Chart, but peaked at number 8 on the UK Independent Singles Chart and number 77 on the UK Streaming Chart.)	—	—	—	—	—	—	—	West End Girl
"Nonmonogamummy" (with Specialist Moss)	2025	— (Note: "Nonmonogamummy" did not enter the UK Singles Chart, but peaked at number 10 on the UK Independent Singles Chart and number 87 on the UK Streaming Chart.)	—	—	—	—	—	—	—	West End Girl
"Just Enough"	2025	— (Note: "Just Enough" did not enter the UK Singles Chart, but peaked at number 14 on the UK Independent Singles Chart.)	—	—	—	—	—	—	—	West End Girl
"Dallas Major"	2025	— (Note: "Just Enough" did not enter the UK Singles Chart, but peaked at number 13 on the UK Independent Singles Chart.)	—	—	—	—	—	—	—	West End Girl
"Beg for Me"	2025	— (Note: "Just Enough" did not enter the UK Singles Chart, but peaked at number 16 on the UK Independent Singles Chart.)	—	—	—	—	—	—	—	West End Girl
"Let You W/In"	2025	— (Note: "Just Enough" did not enter the UK Singles Chart, but peaked at number 18 on the UK Independent Singles Chart.)	—	—	—	—	—	—	—	West End Girl
"Fruityloop"	2025	— (Note: "Just Enough" did not enter the UK Singles Chart, but peaked at number 21 on the UK Independent Singles Chart.)	—	—	—	—	—	—	—	West End Girl
"—" denotes a recording that did not chart or was not released in that territory.

== Guest appearances ==
List of non-single guest appearances, with other performing artists, showing year released and album name
Title	Year	Other artist	Album	Credit
"Lights Go Down"	2006	Basement Jaxx	Crazy Itch Radio	Backing vocals
"Bongo Bong and Je Ne T'Aime Plus"	2006	Robbie Williams	Rudebox	Backing vocals
"Wanna Be"	2007	Dizzee Rascal	Maths + English	Featured artist
"Rawhide"	2007	Jamie T	"Sheila" single	Featured artist
"Everybody's Changing"	2007	None	The Saturday Sessions: The Dermot O'Leary Show	None
"Don't Get Me Wrong"	2007	None	Radio 1 Established 1967	None
"Never Miss a Beat"	2008	Kaiser Chiefs	Off with Their Heads	Backing vocals
"Always Happens Like That"	2008	Kaiser Chiefs	Off with Their Heads	Featured artist
"Straight to Hell"	2009	Mick Jones	War Child Presents Heroes	Featured artist
"Dream a Little Dream"	2013	Robbie Williams	Swings Both Ways	Featured artist
"Mr C"	2014	Nina Nesbitt	Peroxide	Backing vocals
"Shelter You"	2014	Louis Eliot	Tarka & Friends: Life	Featured artist
"King Many Layers"	2014	Fryars	The Boy in the Hood	Featured artist
"Something's Not Right"	2015	None	Pan: Original Motion Picture Soundtrack	None
"Little Soldier"	2015	None	Pan: Original Motion Picture Soundtrack	None
"Something Better"	2018	S-X	Reasons	Featured artist

== Music videos ==
=== As lead artist ===
List of music videos as lead artist, showing year released and directors
Title	Year	Director(s)
"LDN" (version 1)	2006	Ben Jones
"Smile"	2006	Sophie Muller
"LDN" (version 2)	2006	Nima Nourizadeh
"Littlest Things"	2006	Nima Nourizadeh
"Alfie"	2007	Sarah Chatfield
"The Fear"	2008	Nez
"Not Fair"	2009	Melina Matsoukas
"Fuck You"	2009	Arnaud Boutin, Camille Dauteuille and Clement Dozier
"22"	2009	Jake Scott
"Who'd Have Known"	2009	James Caddick
"The Fear (The People vs. Lily Allen)"	2010	Unknown
"Hard out Here"	2013	Christopher Sweeney
"Somewhere Only We Know"	2013	Unknown
"Air Balloon"	2014	That Go
"Our Time"	2014	Christopher Sweeney
"Sheezus"	2014	Ruffmercy
"URL Badman"	2014	The Sacred Egg
"As Long as I Got You"	2014	Christopher Sweeney
"Going to a Town"	2017	Bafic
"Trigger Bang"	2018	Myles Whittingham
"Lost My Mind"	2018	Myles Whittingham

=== As featured artist ===
List of music videos as featured artist, showing year released and directors
Title	Year	Director(s)
"Who Invented Fish & Chips? (Who Invented Poo?)" (Fat Les)	2002	Unknown
"Oh My God" (Mark Ronson featuring Lily Allen)	2007	Nima Nourizadeh
"Drivin' Me Wild" (Common featuring Lily Allen)	2007	Chris Robinson
"Just Be Good to Green" (Professor Green featuring Lily Allen)	2010	Henry Scholfield
"5 O'Clock" (T-Pain featuring Wiz Khalifa and Lily Allen)	2011	Erik White
"True Love" (Pink featuring Lily Allen)	2013	Sophie Muller
"Cigarettes and Cush" (Stormzy featuring Kehlani & Lily Allen)	2017	Daps
"Heaven's Gate/Sekkle Down" (Burna Boy featuring Lily Allen and J. Hus)	2018	Dan Emmerson
"Roll the Dice" (Shy FX featuring Stamina MC & Lily Allen)	2018	Louis Browne

=== Other appearances ===
List of appearances in other artists' music videos
Title	Year	Director(s)
"Vindaloo" (Fat Les)	1998	Unknown
