= Our Time =

Our Time may refer to:

== Film ==
- Our Time (1974 film), a 1974 film directed by Peter Hyams
- Our Time (2018 film), a 2018 film directed by Carlos Reygadas
- Our Times, a 2015 Taiwanese school romance drama film directed by Frankie Chen

== Music ==
- Our Time (album), a 2008 album by The Gordons
- "Our Time" (Dream song), 2001
- "Our Time" (Lily Allen song), 2014
- "Our Time", a song from the musical Merrily We Roll Along
- "Our Time", a song on the 1999 album Animal Soup by Simon Townshend
- "Our Time", a song by Yeah Yeah Yeahs from Yeah Yeah Yeahs, 2001

== Organizations ==
- Our Time (nonprofit), an American non-profit created by Matthew Segal
