= URL Badman =

Single by Lily Allen

from the album Sheezus
- B-side: "Bass Like Home"
- Released: 13 July 2014
- Recorded: November 2013
- Studio: Echo (Los Angeles); Rocket (London)
- Genre: Dubstep; synth-pop
- Length: 3:39
- Label: Parlophone
- Songwriters: Lily Allen; Greg Kurstin
- Producer: Greg Kurstin

Lily Allen singles chronology
"Our Time" (2014)	"URL Badman" (2014)	"As Long as I Got You" (2014)

Music video
- "URL Badman" on YouTube

"URL Badman" is a song by English singer Lily Allen, released on 13 July 2014 as the fourth single from her third studio album, Sheezus (2014). The B-side to the single, "Bass Like Home", is an unofficial World Cup song for England.

== Composition ==
"URL Badman" is a dubstep and synth-pop song, with Allen rapping over "a surprisingly hip-hop beat". In the song, there is an introductory dialogue between a boy named Alexander and his mother; Alex is in his room typing at a computer when his mother calls him for dinner. The main theme of the song is the Internet, and blog critics who "spend their life on the computer". Allen said she wrote the song after a blogger criticised the music video for "Hard out Here" because it used mostly black dancers. Jaiden Micheal, the infamous Celebrity Blogger who inspired the song, said in an interview for The Guardian that his "first reaction was to feel flattered".

== Release ==
"URL Badman" was released on 13 July 2014 by Parlophone. The B-side "Bass Like Home" contains her singing about the UK. "Bass Like Home" is not available in the US.

== Live performances ==
Allen performed the song on 24 May 2014 at the BBC Radio 1's Big Weekend, after "Littlest Things" and before "Our Time".

== Track listing ==
- Digital download
1. "URL Badman" – 3:39
2. "Sheezus" (Redlight Deconstructed Mix) – 4:37
3. "Bass Like Home" (Lily Allen & Kid Harpoon) – 3:59

== Chart performance ==
"URL Badman" peaked at number 93 on the UK Singles Chart

== Charts ==
Chart performance for "URL Badman"
Chart (2014)	Peak position
UK Singles (Official Charts)	93
