= L8 CMMR =

Promotional single by Lily Allen

from the album Sheezus
- Released: 6 February 2014
- Recorded: 2013
- Genre: Electropop; bubblegum pop
- Length: 3:41
- Label: Parlophone
- Songwriters: Lily Allen; Greg Kurstin
- Producer: Greg Kurstin

Lyric video
- "L8 CMMR" on YouTube

"L8 CMMR" (pronounced "latecomer") is a song by English singer Lily Allen from her third studio album, Sheezus (2014). It premiered online on 6 February 2014, the same day as the release of her previous single "Air Balloon" music video.

== Composition ==
This track follows the style of her previous single, "Air Balloon", and is a bubblegum pop and electropop song. The song also features heavy amounts of autotune, as well as chipper synths. Described as a "no brainer (song)" by Allen herself, the song describes her love to a man, whom nobody can ever steal away from her.

== Release ==
The song was included in Girls Volume 2: All Adventurous Women Do, the soundtrack of the second series of the HBO series Girls.

== Lyric video ==
On 17 February 2014, an official lyric video of the song was released on her official YouTube channel. The lyric video features a retrogaming-inspired video. The video shows Allen as a character of a 1980s video game, who needs to fight and overcome obstacles, like racing, in order to win prizes like engagement rings. The video received critical acclaim and was a fan favorite as the video was fun and different from mainstream videos.

== Reception ==
The song received generally positive reviews from music critics. Spin gave a positive review of the song, calling it a "bright, bouncy electro-pop with well-crafted hooks and some playful Auto-Tune effects", but also stated it was a "little lackluster". In May 2014, the song debuted at number 61 on the Flanders Ultratip chart, and later reached number 4.

== Charts ==
Chart (2014)	Peak position
Belgium (Ultratip Bubbling Under Flanders)	4
