= Cold (Stormzy song) =

2017 single by Stormzy

Single by Stormzy

from the album Gang Signs & Prayer
- Released: 24 February 2017
- Genre: Grime
- Length: 2:36
- Label: #Merky
- Songwriter(s): Michael Omari
- Producer(s): Swifta Beater

Stormzy singles chronology
"5ive" (2017)	"Cold" (2017)	"All Time Low (Remix)" (2017)

Music video
- "Cold" on YouTube

"Cold" is a song by English rapper Stormzy. It was released as the second single from his debut studio album Gang Signs & Prayer on 24 February 2017, by #Merky Records. It peaked at number twenty-one on the UK Singles Chart.

== Chart performance ==
On 3 March 2017, the song entered the UK Singles Chart at number twenty-one.

== Charts ==
=== Weekly charts ===
Chart (2017)	Peak position
UK Indie (OCC)	2
UK Hip Hop/R&B (OCC)	2
UK Singles (OCC)	21

== Certifications ==
Region	Certification	Certified units/sales
United Kingdom (BPI)	Gold	400,000^{‡}
^{‡} Sales+streaming figures based on certification alone.

== Release history ==
Region	Date	Label	Format
Worldwide	24 February 2017	#Merky	Digital download
