= Honey (Kehlani song) =

2017 song by Kehlani

Single by Kehlani
- Released: October 6, 2017
- Length: 3:19
- Label: Atlantic
- Songwriters: Kehlani Parrish; Ambré Perkins; Jean Deaux
- Producers: Geoffro; Kehlani

Kehlani singles chronology
"Cigarettes & Cush" (2017)	"Honey" (2017)	"Touch" (2017)

Music video
- "Honey" on YouTube

"Honey" is a song by American singer and songwriter Kehlani. It was released on October 6, 2017. They first performed the song live at Billboard's Women in Music 2017. The official music video was released on December 4, 2017.

== Background ==
"Honey" was written by Kehlani and produced by Geoffro. Kehlani said the song was made using a Geoffro guitar loop with their best friends. The song was written for their lover, and sees Kehlani using romance as an escape and to let their pain go.

== Music video ==
The song's accompanying music video premiered on December 4, 2017 on Kehlani's YouTube account. The music video was directed by David Camarena.

== Critical reception ==
In 2019, Billboard included the song in its list of the "30 Lesbian Love Songs".

== Certifications ==
Certifications for "Honey"
Region	Certification	Certified units/sales
Canada (Music Canada)	Platinum	80,000^{‡}
New Zealand (RMNZ)	Platinum	30,000^{‡}
United States (RIAA)	Gold	500,000^{‡}
^{‡} Sales+streaming figures based on certification alone.
