= Somewhere Only We Know =

2004 single by Keane

Single by Keane

from the album Hopes and Fears
- B-side: "Snowed Under"; "Walnut Tree"
- Released: 16 February 2004
- Recorded: 2003
- Studio: Heliocentric (Rye, East Sussex, England); Les Essarts (Normandy, France)
- Genre: Alternative rock
- Length: 3:57
- Label: Island; Interscope
- Songwriters: Tim Rice-Oxley; Tom Chaplin; Richard Hughes
- Producers: Andy Green; James Sanger; Keane

Keane singles chronology
"This Is the Last Time" (2003)	"Somewhere Only We Know" (2004)	"Everybody's Changing" (2004)

Official UK video
- "Somewhere Only We Know" on YouTube

"Somewhere Only We Know" is a song composed and performed by English alternative rock band Keane, officially released as the first single from their debut album, Hopes and Fears (2004). The song peaked at number three in the UK Singles Chart during its first week of sales, becoming the band's signature song and biggest hit single to date. It has been certified triple platinum in the UK and double platinum in the US. Keane would perform the song during their set at Live 8 held at Hyde Park, London in 2005.

In 2013, the song was covered by Lily Allen for a John Lewis Christmas advert. Allen's version reached number one on the UK Singles Chart.

== Composition and recording ==
The first demo was composed by Tim Rice-Oxley in about 2001. Rice-Oxley explained that the song came from "hammering away on the piano":

"I was thinking of something like David Bowie's "Heroes", which you drive along to a really rocking beat ... It was one of the first things we recorded for the album".

It was first played on the guitar just before Dominic Scott left the band, and recorded as a demo the same year with a Yamaha CP-70 instead of the guitar. Keane recorded the final version in 2003 at the Helioscentric Studios, Rye, East Sussex for the album.

"Somewhere Only We Know" is a traditional piano rock song, and leaned on different influences, "A lot of The Smiths, Oasis, U2, The Beatles, Radiohead [and] Paul Simon", according to Rice-Oxley. The piano is the most prominent instrument due to its harmonic and rhythmic role. It is played in quavers throughout the whole song, holding the tempo and the rhythmic pattern.

The studio version is recorded in 86 bpm, and follows a 4/4 time signature – the most commonly used in traditional rock songs. It is in the key of A major. The song form can be analysed as ABAB CBCB, a variation of the strophic form. The verse (A) chord progression is a plain (I-II-V), one of the most used chord progressions in music; the chorus (B) presents a (VI-III-IV-V) progression; the variation of the verse section (C) presents a (II-III-IV-V) progression.

The bassline was recorded by Rice-Oxley. When played live (up until 2007 with the arrival of bassist Jesse Quin), this song uses a pre-recorded bass, which is played in an Apple PowerBook G4. The 16-beat rhythm was made by Hughes.

== Lyrics ==
The song's lyrics refer to Manser's Shaw, a place in Battle, East Sussex that Keane members used to visit in their childhood and the site of the Battle of Hastings, fought on 14 October 1066. According to Rice-Oxley, they wrote the song after returning to Battle from London after failing to achieve musical success. He told Dave Simpson of The Guardian: "I picture a particular place in Sussex, just a bit of scrub where we used to go when we were kids", and spoke of a fallen pine tree (referenced in the song as "I came across a fallen tree") where the three of them were photographed together around the age of 11. The "pathway" referenced in the song refers to the trail between the house of Rice-Oxley's parents and the local pub.

Richard Hughes, Keane's drummer, offered the following explanation of the song on Chris Flynn's fansite:

"We've been asked whether "Somewhere Only We Know" is about a specific place, and Tim has been saying that, for him, or us as individuals, it might be about a geographical space, or a feeling; it can mean something individual to each person, and they can interpret it to a memory of theirs...It's perhaps more of a theme rather than a specific message...Feelings that may be universal, without necessarily being totally specific to us, or a place, or a time..."

== B-sides ==
Snowed Under

The song talks about a place called "Manser's Shaw" in Battle, East Sussex where the band used to spend their childhood days. It was inspired by a poem. "Snowed Under" was the only B-side played live during 2004, 2005, and early 2006, because of its appearance on the CD+DVD version of Hopes and Fears. Like "Walnut Tree", this song was mixed by Andy Green. "Snowed Under" also titles the band's debut album, with the line "someone who understands your hopes and fears".

Walnut Tree

The lyrics talk about waiting for someone under a walnut tree, but Rice-Oxley has not given this meaning. It appeared on the Music from the OC: Mix 2 soundtrack. James Sanger is credited on this song for his contributions at his studios in France.

== Music video ==
The video is directed by Corin Hardy.

It features the band going into a taxi with a Simple Thing alien and travelling to the woods before arriving at a river.

== Cover art ==
The cover art, designed by Madefire and Alex Lake, represents maple leaves falling, as on the music video. It also relates to the themes of the B-sides, "Walnut Tree" and "Snowed Under". Although neither of these songs appear on the Hopes and Fears album, they are relatively well known due to live performances and soundtracks. The letters reading "KEANE" are also in the background, featuring the red leaves.

== Live performances ==
Keane's signature song, the group have played "Somewhere Only We Know" at many concerts, including at Live 8 in Hyde Park, London, along with the single "Bedshaped", in 2005, and at Glastonbury in 2024.

== Track listings ==
Enhanced CD single Catalogue number: CID849
The CD included two different wallpapers for the PC and the official UK release music video.

1. "Somewhere Only We Know" – 3:58
2. "Snowed Under" – 3:51
3. "Walnut Tree" – 3:40
4. "Somewhere Only We Know" (CD-ROM video) – 3:56

UK 7-inch vinyl Catalogue number: IS849

1. "Somewhere Only We Know"
2. "Snowed Under"

UK 3-inch pocket CD Released 19 July 2004. It included links for download polyphonic and real ringtones.

1. "Somewhere Only We Know"
2. "Snowed Under"

=== Alternative versions ===
German enhanced CD single Released 26 March 2004.

1. "Somewhere Only We Know"
2. "Snowed Under"

Spanish enhanced CD single Released 16 April 2004.

1. "Somewhere Only We Know"
2. "Walnut Tree"
3. "Somewhere Only We Know" (video)

== Charts ==
=== Weekly charts ===
2004–2015 weekly chart performance for "Somewhere Only We Know"
Chart (2004–2015)	Peak position
Australia (ARIA)	62
Belgium (Ultratop 50 Flanders)	43
Belgium (Ultratip Bubbling Under Wallonia)	6
Canada Hot AC Top 30 (Radio & Records)	9
Denmark (Tracklisten)	9
Europe (Eurochart Hot 100)	12
France (SNEP)	42
France Download Chart (SNEP)	17
Germany (GfK)	55
Ireland (IRMA)	30
Italy (FIMI)	44
Netherlands (Dutch Top 40)	15
Netherlands (Single Top 100)	15
New Zealand (Recorded Music NZ)	19
Scottish Singles Sales (Official Charts)	4
UK Singles (Official Charts)	3
US Billboard Hot 100	50
US Adult Alternative Airplay (Billboard)	2
US Adult Contemporary (Billboard)	37
US Adult Pop Airplay (Billboard)	11
US Alternative Airplay (Billboard)	32
US Pop Airplay (Billboard)	36

2022–2025 weekly chart performance for "Somewhere Only We Know"
Chart (2022–2025)	Peak position
Netherlands (Single Top 100)	98
Global 200 (Billboard)	111
Portugal (AFP)	97

=== Year-end charts ===
2004 year-end chart performance for "Somewhere Only We Know"
Chart (2004)	Position
Netherlands (Dutch Top 40)	83
Netherlands (Single Top 100)	69
UK Singles (OCC)	80
US Triple-A (Billboard)	50

2005 year-end chart performance for "Somewhere Only We Know"
Chart (2005)	Position
US Adult Top 40 (Billboard)	34
US Triple-A (Billboard)	17

2023 year-end chart performance for "Somewhere Only We Know"
Chart (2023)	Position
Global Excl. US (Billboard)	125

2024 year-end chart performance for "Somewhere Only We Know"
Chart (2024)	Position
Global 200 (Billboard)	192

2025 year-end chart performance for "Somewhere Only We Know"
Chart (2025)	Position
Argentina Anglo Airplay (Monitor Latino)	80
Global 200 (Billboard)	109

== Certifications ==
Certifications for "Somewhere Only We Know"
Region	Certification	Certified units/sales
Belgium (BRMA)	Gold	25,000^{*}
Brazil (Pro-Música Brasil)	Platinum	60,000^{‡}
Denmark (IFPI Danmark)	Platinum	90,000^{‡}
Germany (BVMI)	Platinum	300,000^{‡}
Italy (FIMI)	2× Platinum	200,000^{‡}
Portugal (AFP)	4× Platinum	40,000^{‡}
Spain (Promusicae)	2× Platinum	120,000^{‡}
United Kingdom (BPI)	3× Platinum	1,800,000^{‡}
United States (RIAA)	2× Platinum	2,000,000^{‡}
^{*} Sales figures based on certification alone.^{‡} Sales+streaming figures based on certification alone.

== Release history ==
Release history and formats for "Somewhere Only We Know"
Region	Date	Format(s)	Label(s)	Ref(s).
United Kingdom	16 February 2004	7-inch vinyl; CD	Island	
Australia	17 May 2004	CD	Island; Interscope	
United States	28 June 2004	Triple A; alternative radio	Interscope	
United States	6 December 2004	Contemporary hit radio	Interscope	

== Lily Allen version ==
"Somewhere Only We Know"

Single by Lily Allen

from the album Sheezus
- Released: 10 November 2013
- Genre: Pop
- Length: 3:28
- Label: Regal; Parlophone
- Songwriters: Tom Chaplin; Richard Hughes; Tim Rice-Oxley
- Producer: Paul Beard

Lily Allen singles chronology
"True Love" (2013)	"Somewhere Only We Know" (2013)	"Hard out Here" (2013)

Music video
- "Lily Allen | Somewhere Only We Know (John Lewis Christmas Advert)" on YouTube

In 2013, English singer Lily Allen released a cover version of the song. It was released on 10 November 2013 in the United Kingdom as a digital download through Parlophone and Regal Recordings. The song was selected as the soundtrack to the John Lewis 2013 Christmas advertisement. The song reached number one in the UK Singles Chart, becoming her third number-one single. It is included on Allen's third studio album, Sheezus.

A portion of the proceeds from the sales of the single were donated to Save the Children's Philippine Typhoon Appeal campaign.

Allen's version of the song was used for the trailer of The Little Prince (2015), which was shown in French. It was also used on an advertisement by Brazilian telecommunications company Vivo in 2015.

The Labour Party used this version in a campaign video for the 2017 UK general election.

=== Music video ===
The video for the song is a composite made by editor Chris Morris of the John Lewis "The Bear and the Hare" Christmas advert, directed by Elliot Dear and Yves Geleyn, and its making-of video, directed by Jake & Josh (Jacob Hopewell & Josh Hine), allowing the song to run to its full length.

=== Commercial performance ===
On 24 November 2013, "Somewhere Only We Know" reached number one in the UK Singles Chart, thus becoming Allen's third number-one single following "Smile" (2006) and "The Fear" (2009). Although the song spent a total of three non-consecutive weeks at the top spot, it did not reach number one on the UK Singles Downloads Chart. It sold 46,279 copies during its second week at number one, the lowest number for a number-one single since Taio Cruz's "Break Your Heart" sold 42,746 copies in its third week at number one in 2009.

In total the single sold over 600,000 copies. According to the BPI, the single was awarded a gold disc in January 2014, representing 400,000 sales. The song was included on the album Now 86! which sold more than 1.1 million copies to become the UK's best-selling album of 2013.

=== Personnel ===
Personnel are adapted from the CD single liner notes.

- Tom Chaplin – songwriter
- Richard Hughes – songwriter
- Tim Rice-Oxley – songwriter
- Lily Allen – lead vocals
- Paul Beard – producer, arranger, mixer, piano, percussion, programming
- Paul Sayer – acoustic guitar
- James Banbury – string arrangement
- Joe Kearns – engineer and mixer
- Andy Cook – assistant
- Will Hicks – assistant
- Matt Dougthy – assistant
- Jason Elliot – additional programming
- Stuart Hawkes – mastering

=== Charts ===
==== Weekly charts ====
Weekly chart performance for "Somewhere Only We Know" by Lily Allen
Chart (2013–2014)	Peak position
Belgium (Ultratip Bubbling Under Flanders)	12
Belgium (Ultratop 50 Wallonia)	22
Euro Digital Songs (Billboard)	2
France (SNEP)	6
Ireland (IRMA)	1
Israel International Airplay (Media Forest)	2
Scottish Singles Sales (Official Charts)	3
Slovakia Airplay (ČNS IFPI)	15
Switzerland (Schweizer Hitparade)	52
UK Singles (Official Charts)	1

==== Year-end charts ====
Year-end chart performance for "Somewhere Only We Know" by Lily Allen
Chart	Year	Position
UK Singles (OCC)	2013	34
France (SNEP)	2014	54
Brazil (Brasil Hot 100)	2016	87

=== Certifications ===
Certifications and sales for "Somewhere Only We Know" by Lily Allen
Region	Certification	Certified units/sales
Denmark (IFPI Danmark)	Gold	45,000^{‡}
New Zealand (RMNZ)	Platinum	30,000^{‡}
United Kingdom (BPI)	3× Platinum	1,800,000^{‡}
^{‡} Sales+streaming figures based on certification alone.

=== Release history ===
Release history and formats for "Somewhere Only We Know" by Lily Allen
Region	Date	Format(s)	Label(s)	Ref.
United Kingdom	10 November 2013	CD single; digital download	Regal; Parlophone	

== In popular culture ==
"Somewhere Only We Know" appeared on Season 1 Episode 2 of ABC's medical drama Grey's Anatomy in 2005, and has since been associated with the show. The Keane recording was also included in the trailers for the Alejandro Agresti's 2006 film The Lake House and the soundtracks of the 2009 film He's Just Not That Into You, the 2011 Disney animated film Winnie the Pooh (with Pooh's Hundred Acre Wood inspired by Ashdown Forest in East Sussex, the same county where the song is set), the 2012 film LOL, and the 2023 Netflix anthology "Beef." Darren Criss performed a cover of the song as character Blaine Anderson in Season 2 Episode 18 of the TV series Glee.
