= Cigarettes & Cush =

Single by Stormzy featuring Kehlani

from the album Gang Signs & Prayer
- Released: 29 August 2017
- Length: 5:49
- Label: #Merky; Warner; ADA
- Songwriter(s): Michael Omari; Fraser T. Smith; Kehlani Ashley Parrish; Dion Wardle
- Producer(s): Fraser T. Smith; Stormzy

Stormzy singles chronology
"Power" (2017)	"Cigarettes & Cush" (2017)	"Momma's Prayers" (2017)

Kehlani singles chronology
"Heebiejeebies" (2017)	"Cigarettes & Cush" (2017)	"Honey" (2017)

Lily Allen singles chronology
"As Long as I Got You" (2014)	"Cigarettes & Cush" (2017)	"Trigger Bang" (2017)

Music video
- "Cigarettes & Cush" on YouTube

"Cigarettes & Cush" is a song by English rapper Stormzy, featuring vocals from American singer and songwriter Kehlani. English singer-songwriter Lily Allen is also heard. It was released as a single on 29 August 2017 as the third single from his debut studio album Gang Signs & Prayer.

== Music video ==
A music video to accompany the release of "Cigarettes & Cush" was first released onto YouTube on 29 August 2017. As of November 2023, the music video has over 2.1 million views.

== Charts ==
Chart (2017)	Peak position
Ireland (IRMA)	79
UK Singles Downloads (OCC)	91
UK Indie (OCC)	6
UK Hip Hop/R&B (OCC)	6
UK Singles (OCC)	30

== Certifications ==
Region	Certification	Certified units/sales
United Kingdom (BPI)	Gold	400,000^{‡}
^{‡} Sales+streaming figures based on certification alone.

== Release history ==
Region	Date	Format	Label
United Kingdom	29 August 2017	Digital download; streaming	#Merky; Warner; ADA
