= Gang Signs & Prayer =

Studio album by Stormzy
- Released: 24 February 2017
- Recorded: 2015–2016
- Genres: Hip hop; grime; R&B
- Length: 58:47
- Labels: #Merky; Warner; ADA
- Producers: Stormzy (exec.); Fraser T. Smith (also exec.); P2J; 169; E.Y Beats; Mura Masa; Sir Spyro; SOS; Sunny Kale; Swifta Beater; Wizzy Wow; XTC

Stormzy chronology
Dreamers Disease (2014)	Gang Signs & Prayer (2017)	Heavy Is the Head (2019)

Singles from Gang Signs & Prayer
- 1. "Big for Your Boots" Released: 3 February 2017; 2. "Cold" Released: 12 March 2017; 3. "Cigarettes & Cush" Released: 29 August 2017; 4. "Blinded by Your Grace, Pt. 2" Released: 27 October 2017

Gang Signs & Prayer is the debut studio album by British rapper Stormzy. It was released on 24 February 2017 independently through #Merky Records while being distributed by ADA of Warner Music Group. It is Stormzy's first major commercial release, following the Dreamers Disease EP (2014). The album features guest appearances from fellow MCs Wretch 32, Ghetts and J Hus, along with singers Kehlani, Raleigh Ritchie and MNEK. It features production from Fraser T. Smith and Sir Spyro, among others.

After gaining attention on the UK underground music scene via his Wicked Skengman series of freestyles over classic grime beats, Stormzy released his debut EP Dreamers Disease independently in July 2014. In September 2015, he released a final instalment to his "WickedSkengMan" freestyle series, "WickedSkengMan 4", onto iTunes. After a year's hiatus from social media to focus on the recording of the album, Stormzy returned in early February 2017 via a series of advertising hoarding campaigns across London displaying lyrical quotes and the hashtag #GSAP 24.02. Gang Signs & Prayer was supported by the lead single "Big for Your Boots".

Gang Signs & Prayer received critical acclaim upon release, and entered the UK Albums Chart at number one with sales of over 68,000 copies, becoming the first grime album in history to reach number one. It also charted in twelve other countries. Gang Signs & Prayer holds the distinction of having every song from the album appear concurrently in the UK Singles Chart, including seven songs in the top 40. The album is certified Platinum by the British Phonographic Industry (BPI). Gang Signs & Prayer won British Album of the Year at the 2018 Brit Awards.

== Background ==
After gaining attention on the UK underground music scene via his Wicked Skengman series of freestyles over classic grime beats, Stormzy released his debut EP Dreamers Disease independently in July 2014.

In March 2015, he released the single "Know Me From", which entered the UK Singles Chart at number 49. In September 2015, he released a final instalment to his "WickedSkengMan" freestyle series, "WickedSkengMan 4", onto iTunes, along with a studio version of his "Shut Up" freestyle over XTC's Functions on the Low instrumental. The track debuted at number 18 in the UK Singles Chart, becoming Stormzy's first top 40 hit. The online video for "Shut Up" gained millions of views and attention from the mainstream. As a result, Stormzy launched a Christmas number one campaign to get the song to number one, ultimately peaking at number eight in the UK Singles Chart.

After a year's hiatus from social media to focus on the recording of the album, Stormzy returned in early February 2017 via a series of advertising hoarding campaigns across London displaying lyrical quotes and the hashtag #GSAP 24.02. The album title was announced to be Gang Signs & Prayer, set to be released on 24 February 2017, followed by the track listing the following day.

== Promotion ==
Prior to the album's official announcement, the non-album track "Shut Up" was released in September 2015 and ultimately included as the penultimate track on Gang Signs & Prayer. The non-album single "Scary" was released in April 2016 prior to Stormzy's hiatus. On 1 February 2017, an advertising hoarding campaign that foreshadowed the release of the album was launched in numerous areas in London.

== Singles ==
"Big for Your Boots" was released as the album's lead single on 3 February 2017. The track was produced by Fraser T Smith and Sir Spyro. It entered the UK Singles Chart at number eight, reaching a peak of number six in its fourth week of charting after the release of Gang Signs & Prayer. It thus surpassed "Shut Up" as Stormzy's highest-charting single. "Cold" was released as the album's second single on 12 March, following the album's being certified Gold in the United Kingdom. "Cigarettes & Cush" was released as the album's third single on 29 August 2017. "Blinded by Your Grace, Pt. 2" was released as the album's fourth single on 27 October 2017.

== Critical reception ==
Professional ratings
Aggregate scores
Source	Rating
AnyDecentMusic?	7.8/10
Metacritic	82/100
Review scores
Source	Rating
AllMusic	4/5 stars
The Daily Telegraph	4/5 stars
Financial Times	4/5 stars
The Guardian	4/5 stars
The Independent	3/5 stars
NME	5/5 stars
The Observer	4/5 stars
Pitchfork	7.6/10
Q	4/5 stars
The Times	4/5 stars

Upon its release, Gang Signs & Prayer received widespread acclaim from critics. At Metacritic, which assigns a normalized rating out of 100 to reviews from mainstream publications, the album received an average score of 82, based on 19 reviews. Giving it a perfect score, Jordan Bassett of NME stated that Stormzy "delivers a knockout debut that’s brash and pensive in equal measure."

Alexis Petridis of The Guardian praised the musical diversity of the album: "More startling, however, is the confidence with which other tracks shift into unexpected musical territory. On paper, a rapper like Stormzy recording a lo-fi, electric piano-led, Stevie Wonderesque gospel track called '"Blinded By Your Grace, Pt 1" sounds like a textbook case of an artist overstretching himself; in reality, it’s fantastic, and oddly moving.", concluding that "It’s not a perfect debut – it’s slightly too long for one thing, and there are a couple of points where it sags – but it sounds like an album teeming with original, daring ideas. More importantly, it sounds like the work of an artist with the confidence and the talent to pull those ideas off."

=== Accolades ===
Publication	Accolade	Year	Rank	Ref.
Drowned in Sound	Favourite Albums of 2017	2017	79	
NME	NME's Albums of the Year 2017	2017	14	
Exclaim!	Exclaim!'s Top 10 Hip-Hop Albums of 2017	2017	10	

== Commercial performance ==
After receiving close competition with Rag'n'Bone Man's Human, Gang Signs & Prayer entered the UK Albums Chart at number one, with combined sales of 68,594 copies. It set British streaming records for the most first-week streams for a number one album in chart history, with 13.9 million streams, surpassing the opening week stream count of Drake's Views. Gang Signs & Prayer became the first grime album to chart at number one, as well as joining the likes of Skepta and Giggs of charting in the top five independently. The album also charted at number one on the UK Independent Chart, UK R&B Chart and the Irish Albums Chart, number two on the Scottish Albums Chart. Outside the UK, it entered the Official New Zealand Music Chart at number 14 and Sverigetopplistan at number 34.

In the album's first week of release, seven tracks from Gang Signs & Prayer were in the top 40 of the UK Singles Chart – "Big for Your Boots", "Cold", "Bad Boys", "First Things First", "Mr Skeng", "Cigarettes & Cush" and "Shut Up". All sixteen tracks from the album appeared in the top 100 in a single week, making Stormzy the fourth artist to achieve this.

Gang Signs & Prayer was certified Silver by the BPI in its first week of release.

== Track listing ==
No.	Title	Writer(s)	Producer(s)	Length
1.	"First Things First"	Michael Omari; Mura Masa	Mura Masa; Fraser T. Smith	3:27
2.	"Cold"	Omari; Swifta Beater	Smith; Swifta Beater; Stormzy	2:36
3.	"Bad Boys" (featuring Ghetts and J Hus)	Omari; Justin Clarke; Momodou "J Hus" Jallow; EY; P2J	Smith; EY; P2J; Stormzy	4:06
4.	"Blinded by Your Grace, Pt. 1"	Omari; Smith; Varren Wade; Dion Wardle	Smith; Stormzy	2:40
5.	"Big for Your Boots"	Omari; Karl Joseph	Smith; Sir Spyro; Stormzy	3:58
6.	"Velvet / Jenny Francis (Interlude)"	Omari; Mikey Akin; Moses Samuels; Nao	Sons of Sonix; Smith; Stormzy	5:39
7.	"Mr Skeng"	Omari; Joseph	Smith; Sir Spyro; Stormzy	3:17
8.	"Cigarettes & Cush" (featuring Kehlani)	Omari; Smith; Kehlani; Wardle	Smith; Stormzy	5:49
9.	"21 Gun Salute (Interlude)" (featuring Wretch 32)	Omari; Jermaine Sinclair; Akin; Samuels	Smith; Stormzy	2:26
10.	"Blinded by Your Grace, Pt. 2" (featuring MNEK)	Omari; Smith; Uzoechi Emenike	Smith; Stormzy	3:50
11.	"Return of the Rucksack"	Omari; Joseph; Dizzee Rascal	Smith; Sir Spyro; Stormzy	3:04
12.	"100 Bags"	Omari; Sunny Kale	Smith; Kale; Stormzy	3:37
13.	"Don't Cry for Me" (featuring Raleigh Ritchie)	Omari; Varren Wade; Isra "Wizzy Wow" Lohata; Prince Galalie; Jacob Anderson	Smith; Wizzy Wow; Stormzy	3:34
14.	"Crazy Titch (Interlude)"	Crazy Titch		2:40
15.	"Shut Up"	Omari; XTC	Stormzy; XTC	2:46
16.	"Lay Me Bare"	Omari; Smith; EY; Kwabs	Smith; EY; Stormzy	5:04
Total length:				58:47

Sample credits

- "Big for Your Boots" contains a sample of "House Train" by Risse.
- "Velvet / Jenny Francis (Interlude)" contains a sample of "Intro (Like Velvet)" by Nao.
- "Return of the Rucksack" interpolates lyrics from "Seems 2 Be" by Dizzee Rascal.
- "Lay Me Bare" contains a sample of "Last Stand" by Kwabs.

== Personnel ==
Vocals

- Stormzy – vocals
- MNEK – vocals
- Raleigh Ritchie – vocals
- Kehlani – vocals
- Lily Allen – vocals
- Wretch 32 – vocals
- J Hus – vocals, backing vocals
- Yasmin Green – vocals
- Sleeks – backing vocals
- Rasul A-Salaam – arranger, vocals
- Keesha Gumbs – vocals
- Babatunde "Soye" Soyebo – vocals
- Monet Ulerio – vocals
- Jenny Francis – spoken word
- Crazy Titch – spoken word
- Mama Stormz – spoken word
- LaDonna Harley-Peters – backing vocals
- Phebe Edwards – backing vocals
- J Warner – backing vocals
- Kenneth Asomani – backing vocals
- Flipz – backing vocals
- Rimes – backing vocals
- Moses Samuels – backing vocals

Instruments

- Rosie Danvers – orchestration, cello
- Ruth O'Reilly – French horn
- Corinne Bailey – French horn
- Mike Lovat – trumpet
- Andy Greenwood – trumpet
- Paul Spong – trumpet
- Dave Stewart – trombone
- Ed Tarrant – trombone
- Owen Slade – tuba
- Simon Haram – saxophone
- Martin Williams – saxophone
- Lydia Griffiths – oboe
- Louise Chapman – bassoon
- Patrick Kiernan – violin
- Hayley Pomfrett – violin
- Debbie Widdup – violin
- Eleanor Mathieson – violin
- Jenny Sacha – violin
- Anna Croad – violin
- Kotono Sato – violin
- Natalia Bonner – violin
- Sally Jackson – violin
- Emma Owens – viola
- Becky Jones – viola
- Nozomi Cohen – viola
- Bryony James – cello
- Richard Pryce – double bass
- Camilla Pay – harp
- Ben Epstein – bass guitar
- Dexter Hercules – drums
- Stormzy – keyboards, piano
- Adam Wakeman – hammond

Production

- Fraser T Smith – producer, mixer, programming, guitar, bass guitar, piano, keys, percussion
- Manon Grandjean – mixer, engineer
- Nick Taylor – engineer
- Tom Coyne – mastering engineer
- Randy Merrill – mastering engineer
- Bryan Wilson – engineer
- Mura Masa – producer, programming
- Swifta Beater – producer, programming
- EY [Eyobed Getachew] – producer, programming
- P2J [Richard Isong] - producer, programming
- Sons of Sonix – production, programming
- Sir Spyro – producer, keyboards, programming
- Sunny Kale – producer, programming
- Wizzy Wow AKA Isra Lohata – producers, programming
- 169 – bass programming
- 6Sixx – producer, programming, mixer
- Scott Jacoby – recording engineer

== Charts ==
=== Weekly charts ===
Chart (2017)	Peak position
Australian Albums (ARIA)	11
Australian Urban Albums (ARIA)	1
Belgian Albums (Ultratop Flanders)	86
Belgian Albums (Ultratop Wallonia)	126
Canadian Albums (Billboard)	91
Danish Albums (Hitlisten)	12
Dutch Albums (Album Top 100)	25
Finnish Albums (Suomen virallinen lista)	44
Irish Albums (IRMA)	1
New Zealand Albums (RMNZ)	14
Norwegian Albums (VG-lista)	22
Scottish Albums (Official Charts)	2
Swedish Albums (Sverigetopplistan)	34
Swiss Albums (Schweizer Hitparade)	38
UK Albums (Official Charts)	1
UK Independent Albums (Official Charts)	1
UK R&B Albums (Official Charts)	1

=== Year-end charts ===
Chart (2017)	Position
UK Albums (OCC)	10

Chart (2018)	Position
UK Albums (OCC)	72

== Certifications ==
Region	Certification	Certified units/sales
Denmark (IFPI Danmark)	Platinum	20,000^{‡}
United Kingdom (BPI)	Platinum	429,833
^{‡} Sales+streaming figures based on certification alone.

== Release history ==
Region	Date	Format	Label
Worldwide	24 February 2017	CD; digital download	#Merky; Warner; ADA
