= Sheezus =

2014 studio album by Lily Allen

- Standard edition cover

Studio album by Lily Allen
- Released: 2 May 2014
- Recorded: March 2012 – November 2013
- Studios: Arcadium (Los Angeles) (Note: "Sheezus"); Echo (Los Angeles) (Note: Additional engineering on tracks 2, 4–12 and "Wind Your Neck In"); MXM (Stockholm) (Note: "Air Balloon"); RAK (London) (Note: "Take My Place", "As Long as I Got You" and "Life for Me"; recording and engineering on "Who Do You Love?" and "Miserable Without Your Love"); Poor Kevin's Studio (Los Angeles) (Note: Lap steel on "Take My Place" and "Life for Me"; Dobro on "As Long as I Got You"); Sound of Sterloid (Los Angeles) (Note: Drums on "Take My Place" and "Life for Me"); Rocket (London) (Note: Additional vocals on "As Long as I Got You" and "URL Badman"); Fryercorp HQ (Los Angeles) (Note: "Who Do You Love?" and "Miserable Without Your Love"); MyAudioTonic (London) (Note: "Holding On to Nothing"); The Matrix (London)
- Genres: Electropop; R&B
- Length: 49:40
- Labels: Regal; Parlophone
- Producers: Paul Beard; DJ Dahi; Fryars; Greg Kurstin; Shellback; Fraser T. Smith

Lily Allen chronology
Paris Live Session (2009)	Sheezus (2014)	No Shame (2018)

Singles from Sheezus
- 1. "Hard Out Here" Released: 17 November 2013; 2. "Air Balloon" Released: 2 March 2014; 3. "Our Time" Released: 10 March 2014; 4. "URL Badman" Released: 13 July 2014; 5. "As Long as I Got You" Released: 24 August 2014

Sheezus is the third studio album by English singer Lily Allen, released on 2 May 2014 by Parlophone. The album was Allen's first work after a five year hiatus since the release of her second studio album, It's Not Me, It's You (2009). Sheezus features production from longtime collaborator Greg Kurstin, along with the likes of Shellback, DJ Dahi and Fraser T. Smith. Upon release, Sheezus received mixed reviews from music critics. The album debuted at number one on the UK Albums Chart, becoming Allen's second consecutive number-one album.

The album was preceded by the release of two singles. The lead single "Hard Out Here" was released on 17 November 2013 and entered the UK Singles Chart at number nine, giving Allen two simultaneous top-10 singles. "Air Balloon" was released as the second single from the album, peaking at number seven on the UK Singles Chart.

== Background ==
Allen released her second album It's Not Me, It's You in 2009, which saw a genre shift to electropop, rather than the ska and reggae influences used in her debut album Alright, Still (2006). The album debuted at number one on the UK Albums Chart and the Australian Albums Chart and was well received by critics, noting the singer's musical evolution and maturity. It spawned the commercially successful singles "The Fear" and "Fuck You", popular mostly in Europe. Allen and Amy Winehouse were credited with starting a process that led to the media-proclaimed "year of the women" in 2009 that saw five female artists making music of "experimentalism and fearlessness" nominated for the Mercury Prize.

In 2009, Allen announced that she would be taking a hiatus from musical activities. The following year, she opened a fashion rental shop named Lucy in Disguise with her sister Sarah, followed by the 2011 launching of her own record label.

== Recording ==
"Lily Allen has found it quite difficult and stressful trying to reconnect. And Lily Cooper is happy because she's not sitting at home playing with toys and speaking with two human beings that can't speak back. There was a void. I'm a creative person, I like to speak my mind. Making music is the perfect vehicle for that. It would be different if I was on Made in Chelsea—that isn't a vessel for creativity. I need somewhere to put my... stuff."

— Allen, on her return to music.

Allen said in October 2012 that she was in the studio, "throwing shit in the wall and seeing if anything sticks ... It's great to work at my own pace with no commitments other than to make music." In February 2013, she performed live at a Paris fashion show produced by Mark Ronson in what she called her "mumback", and foreshadowed the release of a new album "inspired by her experiences of motherhood" by the end of 2013.

In 2013, Allen revealed that she had begun working on her third studio album. On 20 June 2012, Allen tweeted that she was in the studio working with Greg Kurstin on new music. She changed her professional name from Lily Allen to Lily Rose Cooper. In August 2013 she changed her professional name back to Allen and tweeted new music would be arriving "soon".

Allen confirmed in an interview with BBC Radio 1 on 19 November 2013 that she was to perform at the 2014 Glastonbury Festival. She also revealed that she wrote a song for the album inspired by a Twitter feud with Azealia Banks that happened in mid-2013. Sheezus was predominantly produced by longtime collaborator Greg Kurstin, with whom Allen had worked on her first and second studio albums. Other collaborations came from DJ Dahi, who produced the album's title track, and Shellback, who produced "Air Balloon".

== Composition ==
Sheezus contains a "diverse mix of vibrant pop hooks, snappy commentary and a fearlessly perceptive outlook." Allen's sound, aesthetic, and lyricism on the album has been described as a return to "the same firecracker who turned heads in the mid-'00s with eclectic, post-hip-hop tunes and bullshit-slaying lyrics". The album's opening track "Sheezus" is a "sarcastic pop" song, containing "anti-pop" lyrics that namecheck singers such as Lady Gaga, Rihanna, Katy Perry, Beyoncé and Lorde. "L8 CMMR" is a bubblegum pop and electropop song, whose lyrics describe Allen's obsession with her male lover.

"Air Balloon" is a bubblegum pop song that was described by Billboard as "more of a loopy lullaby than a slice of social commentary", the song contains a toy piano arrangement and creaseless beat. "Our Time" is song built over "synth pop swirls", described as having a "carefree attitude". "Insincerely Yours" is a funk song that contains a "narrative of blunt truths and gutsy celeb culture sneers." The track namechecks models Cara Delevingne and Jourdan Dunn, as well as singer Rita Ora; Allen stated that the song is "not about them, it's about the idea of them—how the media perceive them. It's about how the way [sic] the media perceive them as entities and how that actually has nothing to do with how they are in real life."

"Take My Place" is a song that lyrically is about Allen's first child who she lost through a stillbirth in 2010. "As Long as I Got You" revolves around the theme of married life and Allen's partying past. "URL Badman" is a response to the controversy surrounding Allen's music video for Hard out Here. The song was described as "an astute slap across the faceless nature of the blogosphere". On "Silver Spoon", Allen lambasts all the critics who continually attribute her success to her privileged upbringing, echoing the "snarky charm" of her previous albums, Alright, Still and It's Not Me, It's You. "Hard out Here" is a "typically outspoken, sweary" synth-pop song. Lyrically, it speaks about "body image pressures and misogyny in the entertainment industry".

== Singles ==
"Hard out Here" was released as the album's lead single on 17 November 2013. Upon release, "Hard out Here" was met with critical acclaim, with critics praising the song's feminist themes. The single debuted at number nine on the UK Singles Chart, selling 30,213 copies in its first week. The song's accompanying music video was a subject of controversy, with Allen accused of being racist for its use of mostly black dancers in an allegedly "disapproving" manner. Allen responded that ethnicity was not a factor in hiring the dancers, and the video was a light-hearted satirical look at objectification of women in modern pop music.

"Air Balloon" premiered on BBC Radio 1 on 13 January 2014, and was released on 2 March 2014 as the second single from the album. The song reached number seven on the UK Singles Chart. A video of "Our Time" appeared on 10 March 2014 to coincide with the tracklisting reveal. The physical release appeared on the 27 April, and peaked at number 43 on the UK Singles Chart. The song was serviced to radio in Italy on 14 April.

"URL Badman" was released on 13 July 2014 as the fourth single from the album. "As Long as I Got You" was released on 24 August 2014 as the fifth and final single. The music video was filmed at the Glastonbury Festival 2014 and released on 24 July.

=== Other songs ===
"Somewhere Only We Know" was released on 10 November 2013 and was used as the John Lewis 2013 Christmas advertisement. "Sheezus" was released as a promotional single on 22 April 2014. According to Allen, the song was not released as an "official single" due to its use of the word "period".

== Release and promotion ==
In December 2013, Allen was announced as one of the newest signees at Warner Bros. Records, following Warner Music Group's acquisition of Parlophone from Universal Music Group in May 2013. In an interview with Graham Norton on The Graham Norton Show on 21 February 2014, Allen confirmed that her third studio album would be titled Sheezus, saying that it is "a little nod to Kanye West", who had released the album Yeezus in 2013. Allen released the album's artwork and track listing on 10 March 2014, the artwork features Allen sitting outside a stately home with Corgis, while the building is engraved with the Latin phrase divide et impera translated to "divide and rule". The same day, Sheezus was made available for pre-order along with the song "Our Time".

On 14 November 2013, Allen made her debut live performance of "Hard Out Here" in the YoYos pod at the Red Bull Revolutions in Sound event on the London Eye. During an interview with Graham Norton on The Graham Norton Show on 21 February 2014, Allen performed the album's second single, "Air Balloon". On 24 May 2014, Allen performed "Sheezus", "Hard Out Here", "URL Badman" and "Our Time" as part of her set at BBC Radio 1's Big Weekend in Glasgow.

Allen played at Glastonbury Festival on 27 June 2014, where she also recorded a video for "As Long as I Got You". Moreover, to promote the album, Allen embarked on the Sheezus Tour, which took place in Europe, Australia and North America.

== Critical reception ==
Professional ratings
Aggregate scores
Source	Rating
Metacritic	60/100
Review scores
Source	Rating
AllMusic	2.5/5 stars
Cuepoint (Expert Witness)	A−
The Daily Telegraph	4/5 stars
The Guardian	3/5 stars
The Independent	4/5 stars
NME	3/10
Pitchfork	5.4/10
Rolling Stone	3/5 stars
Slant Magazine	3.5/5 stars
Spin	5/10

Sheezus received mixed reviews from music critics. At Metacritic, which assigns a weighted mean rating out of 100 to reviews from mainstream critics, the album received an average score of 60 based on 29 reviews, indicating "mixed or average reviews".

In his review for The Guardian, journalist Alexis Petridis said Allen seems timid lyrically and musically inconsistent on an album that is "far from terrible – indeed, in parts it's very sharp". NME magazine's Laura Snapes was more critical and derided the lyrics as egotistical, clichéd, lacking conviction, and plagued by "empty grandstanding, trying to say something about female oppression, but not knowing quite what". Stephen Thomas Erlewine, writing for AllMusic, felt only "Life for Me", "Insincerely Yours", and "URL Badman" showcase Allen's usually sharp songwriting, as "many of these songs falter on their specificity; she's traded incisive commentary for pedantic details paired with music that winds up diminished by her weariness." Stephanie Benson of Spin believed Allen's message in her lyrics about marriage and womanhood are inconsistent with the party themes on other songs: "Her attempt at convincing us she's a loving wife and mother of two, a savvy feminist, and a satirical mastermind mostly comes off as disingenuous."

In a positive review for the Chicago Tribune, Greg Kot argued that Sheezus is a modest but successful pop album that "connects because it's more conversational than confrontational, a personal statement that dabbles in pop rather than trying to embody the pop moment." Andy Gill of The Independent found both the music and themes diverse, which he felt "clinches the album's success, confirming that this is an artist with taste and opinions of her own, not just a schedule and a fanbase to satisfy". Robert Christgau was impressed by how melodic some of the songs are and Allen's take on marriage in her lyrics, writing in his review for Cuepoint: "Even when that bliss devolves into a painful argument, she can put it into song, and though the bite that was her premarital specialty has softened, give her credit—marital bliss is a theme few lyricists sharpen much at all."

Sheezus was placed at number 47 on The Daily Telegraph's list of 2014's best albums. Christgau ranked it 32nd on his year-end list for The Barnes & Noble Review.

== Commercial performance ==
Sheezus debuted atop the UK Albums Chart with first-week sales of 35,414 copies, becoming Allen's second consecutive number-one album. As of June 2018, it had sold 113,054 copies in the United Kingdom. In the United States, the album debuted at number 12 on the Billboard 200, selling 17,000 copies in its first week. In Japan, it sold 1,931 copies to enter the Oricon Weekly Albums Chart at number 26. The album debuted at number 23 on the French Albums Chart with 2,300 copies sold in its first week.

== Track listing ==
Sheezus – standard edition
No.	Title	Writer(s)	Producer(s)	Length
1.	"Sheezus"	Lily Allen; Dacoury Natche	DJ Dahi	3:54
2.	"L8 CMMR"	Allen; Greg Kurstin	Kurstin	3:24
3.	"Air Balloon"	Allen; Shellback	Shellback	3:48
4.	"Our Time"	Allen; Kurstin	Kurstin	4:19
5.	"Insincerely Yours"	Allen; Kurstin	Kurstin	3:39
6.	"Take My Place"	Allen; Kurstin; Karen Poole	Kurstin	3:31
7.	"As Long as I Got You"	Allen; Kurstin; Poole	Kurstin	3:23
8.	"Close Your Eyes"	Allen; Kurstin	Kurstin	3:36
9.	"URL Badman"	Allen; Kurstin	Kurstin	3:39
10.	"Silver Spoon"	Allen; Kurstin	Kurstin	3:37
11.	"Life for Me"	Allen; Kurstin; Poole	Kurstin	4:00
12.	"Hard Out Here"	Allen; Kurstin	Kurstin	3:31
13.	"Interlude"	Benjamin Garrett; Allen	Fryars (Garrett)	1:38
14.	"Somewhere Only We Know" (bonus track)	Tom Chaplin; Richard Hughes; Tim Rice-Oxley	Paul Beard	3:28
Total length:				49:40

Sheezus – deluxe edition bonus disc
No.	Title	Writer(s)	Producer(s)	Length
1.	"Wind Your Neck In"	Allen; Kurstin	Kurstin	3:19
2.	"Who Do You Love?"	Garrett; Allen	Fryars (Garrett)^{[a]}; DJ Dahi^{[a]}	3:26
3.	"Miserable Without Your Love"	Garrett; Allen	Fryars (Garrett)^{[a]}; DJ Dahi^{[a]}	3:23
4.	"Holding On to Nothing"	Allen; Fraser T. Smith; Rice-Oxley	Smith	2:59
5.	"Somewhere Only We Know"	Chaplin; Hughes; Rice-Oxley	Beard	3:28
Total length:				60:59

Sheezus – Japanese edition bonus tracks
No.	Title	Writer(s)	Producer(s)	Length
15.	"Wind Your Neck In"	Allen; Kurstin	Kurstin	3:19
16.	"Who Do You Love?"	Garrett; Allen	Fryars (Garrett)^{[a]}; DJ Dahi^{[a]}	3:26
17.	"Miserable Without Your Love"	Garrett; Allen	Fryars (Garrett)^{[a]}; DJ Dahi^{[a]}	3:23
18.	"Holding On to Nothing"	Allen; Smith; Rice-Oxley	Smith	2:59
19.	"Air Balloon" (Digital Farm Animals Remix)	Allen; Shellback	Shellback; Digital Farm Animals^{[b]}	4:29
20.	"Air Balloon" (Taiki & Nulight Dub Remix)	Allen; Shellback	Shellback; Taiki & Nulight^{[b]}	5:44

Sheezus – Japan tour limited edition bonus track
No.	Title	Writer(s)	Producer(s)	Length
21.	"Bass Like Home"	Allen; Kid Harpoon	Kid Harpoon	4:00

Sheezus – Japan tour limited edition bonus DVD
No.	Title	Length
1.	"Hard Out Here" (music video)	4:22
2.	"Air Balloon" (music video)	4:02
3.	"Our Time" (music video)	4:45
4.	"URL Badman" (music video)	3:54
5.	"As Long as I Got You" (music video)	4:09
6.	"Sheezus" (track by track)	19:54

Notes

- ^{^[a]} signifies a co-producer
- ^{^[b]} signifies a remixer
- The track "Interlude" only appears on the standard edition as a hidden track.

== Personnel ==
=== Standard edition ===
Credits adapted from the liner notes of Sheezus.

Musicians

- Lily Allen – lead vocals
- Alex Burey – guitar (track 1)
- Greg Kurstin – keyboards (tracks 2, 4–6, 8–12); programming (tracks 2, 5, 6, 8–11); drums (tracks 4, 6, 7, 12); piano (tracks 4, 7, 12); guitar (tracks 4, 5, 7, 8, 11); bass (tracks 5–7, 11, 12); accordion (track 7)
- Shellback – background vocals, keyboards, programming (track 3)
- Kevin Dukes – lap steel (tracks 6, 11); Dobro (track 7)
- Aaron Sterling – drums (tracks 6, 11)
- Paul Beard – arrangements, piano, percussion, programming (track 14)
- James Banbury – string arrangements (track 14)
- Andy Cook – string arrangement assistance (track 14)
- Matt Doughty – string arrangement assistance (track 14)
- Will Hicks – string arrangement assistance (track 14)
- Paul Sayer – acoustic guitar (track 14)

Technical

- DJ Dahi – production (track 1)
- Sean Tallman – mixing (track 1)
- Doron Dina – mixing assistance (track 1)
- Mike Reeves – additional engineering (track 1)
- Greg Kurstin – production, engineering (tracks 2, 4–12); mixing (tracks 5–12)
- Serban Ghenea – mixing (tracks 2–4)
- Alex Pasco – additional engineering (tracks 2, 4–12); engineering assistance (track 12)
- John Hanes – engineering for mix (tracks 2–4, 8)
- Tim Roberts – engineering assistance (tracks 2, 3)
- Shellback – production (track 3)
- Ilya Salmanzadeh – engineering assistance (track 3)
- Robert Möllard – engineering assistance (track 3)
- Jesse Shatkin – additional engineering (tracks 6, 7, 11)
- Mike Horner – recording assistance (tracks 6, 7)
- Rob MacFarlane – recording assistance (tracks 6, 7)
- Kevin Dukes – lap steel recording (tracks 6, 11); Dobro recording (track 7)
- Aaron Sterling – drum recording (tracks 6, 11)
- Will Hicks – additional vocal recording (tracks 7, 9)
- Matt Doughty – additional vocal recording (tracks 7, 9)
- Julian Burg – additional engineering (track 10)
- Fryars (Benjamin Garrett) – production, mixing (track 13)
- Paul Beard – production, co-mixing (track 14)
- Joe Kearns – engineering, co-mixing (track 14)
- Geoff Pesche – mastering (tracks 1–13)
- Stuart Hawkes – mastering (track 14)

Artwork

- Aimee Phillips – creative direction, art direction, design
- Lily Allen – art direction, design
- Richard Welland – art direction, design
- Jamie Nelson – photography
- Michael Whitham – commissioning

=== Deluxe edition bonus disc ===
Credits adapted from the liner notes of the deluxe edition of Sheezus.

Musicians

- Greg Kurstin – bass, drums, keyboards (track 1)
- DJ Dahi – programming, keyboards (tracks 2, 3)
- Ben Esser – drums, percussion (track 2)
- Benjamin Garrett – piano, bass (track 2); programming (tracks 2, 3); all parts (track 3)
- LaDonna Marie Harley-Peters – backing vocals (track 4)
- Tim Rice-Oxley – backing vocals, piano (track 4)
- Fraser T. Smith – guitars, keyboards (track 4)
- Sam Skirrow – bass guitar (track 4)
- Ash Soan – drums (track 4)
- Paul Beard – arrangements, piano, percussion, programming (track 5)
- James Banbury – string arrangements (track 5)
- Andy Cook – string arrangement assistance (track 5)
- Matt Doughty – string arrangement assistance (track 5)
- Will Hicks – string arrangement assistance (track 5)
- Paul Sayer – acoustic guitar (track 5)

Technical

- Greg Kurstin – production, mixing, engineering (track 1)
- Alex Pasco – additional engineering (track 1)
- Fryars (Benjamin Garrett) – co-production (tracks 2, 3)
- DJ Dahi – co-production (tracks 2, 3)
- Sean Tallman – mixing (tracks 2, 3)
- Mike Horner – engineering (tracks 2, 3)
- Fraser T. Smith – production, recording (track 4)
- Graham Archer – mixing, recording (track 4)
- Paul Beard – production, co-mixing (track 5)
- Joe Kearns – engineering, co-mixing (track 5)
- Geoff Pesche – mastering (tracks 1–4)
- Stuart Hawkes – mastering (track 5)

== Charts ==
=== Weekly charts ===
Chart (2014)	Peak position
Australian Albums (ARIA)	4
Austrian Albums (Ö3 Austria)	23
Belgian Albums (Ultratop Flanders)	31
Belgian Albums (Ultratop Wallonia)	35
Canadian Albums (Billboard)	16
Czech Albums (ČNS IFPI)	26
Dutch Albums (Album Top 100)	26
Finnish Albums (Suomen virallinen lista)	32
French Albums (SNEP)	32
German Albums (Offizielle Top 100)	20
Hungarian Albums (MAHASZ)	3
Irish Albums (IRMA)	4
Italian Albums (FIMI)	32
Japanese Albums (Oricon)	26
New Zealand Albums (RMNZ)	9
Scottish Albums (Official Charts)	3
Spanish Albums (Promusicae)	36
Swiss Albums (Schweizer Hitparade)	16
UK Albums (Official Charts)	1
US Billboard 200	12

Chart (2026)	Peak position
Croatian International Albums (HDU)	13

=== Year-end charts ===
Year-end chart performance for Sheezus
Chart (2014)	Position
Hungarian Albums (MAHASZ) Chart position	77
Hungarian Albums (MAHASZ) Sales	48
UK Albums (OCC)	78

== Certifications ==
Certifications for Sheezus
Region	Certification	Certified units/sales
Hungary (MAHASZ)	Gold	1,000^{^}
New Zealand (RMNZ)	Gold	7,500^{‡}
United Kingdom (BPI)	Gold	113,054
^{^} Shipments figures based on certification alone.^{‡} Sales+streaming figures based on certification alone.

== Release history ==
Release dates and formats for Sheezus
Region	Date	Format(s)	Edition	Label	Ref.
Australia	2 May 2014	CD; digital download	Standard; deluxe	Warner	
Australia	2 May 2014	LP	Standard	Warner	
Germany	2 May 2014	CD; LP	Standard	Warner	
Germany	2 May 2014	CD; digital download	Deluxe	Warner	
France	5 May 2014	CD; digital download	Standard; deluxe	Warner	
France	5 May 2014	LP + CD	Standard	Warner	
United Kingdom	5 May 2014	CD; digital download	Standard; deluxe	Regal; Parlophone	
United Kingdom	5 May 2014	LP + CD	Standard	Regal; Parlophone	
United States	6 May 2014	CD	Deluxe	Warner Bros.	
United States	6 May 2014	Digital download	Standard; deluxe	Warner Bros.	
Japan	7 May 2014	CD	Deluxe	Warner	
Japan	7 May 2014	Digital download	Standard; deluxe	Warner	
Brazil	21 May 2014	CD	Standard	Warner	
United States	27 May 2014	LP	Standard	Warner Bros.	
Japan	21 January 2015	CD + DVD	Japan tour limited edition	Warner	
