= As Long as I Got You (Lily Allen song) =

Single by Lily Allen

from the album Sheezus
- Released: 24 August 2014
- Studio: Poor Kevin's Studio (Los Angeles); Rocket Studio (London)
- Genre: Zydeco; country
- Length: 3:23
- Label: Parlophone
- Songwriters: Lily Allen; Greg Kurstin; Karen Poole
- Producer: Greg Kurstin

Lily Allen singles chronology
| "URL Badman" (2014) | "As Long as I Got You" (2014) | "Cigarettes & Cush" (2017) |

Music video
- "As Long As I Got You" on YouTube

"As Long as I Got You" is a song by English singer Lily Allen from her third studio album, Sheezus (2014). It was released as the fifth and final single from the album on 24 August 2014.

== Background ==
Allen confirmed during an interview to the BBC at Glastonbury that she recorded a music video for another album track and a music video for a future single.

== Composition ==
"As Long as I Got You" is a zydeco and country song. Kenneth Partridge commented on the track's Cajun influence by stating, "Maybe all Allen needed was a trip to New Orleans" to make a "Cajun-spiced, country-fried, half-baked tune".

== Chart performance ==
| Chart (2014) | Peak position |
|---|---|
| Australia (ARIA) | 45 |
