= Our Time (Lily Allen song) =

Single by Lily Allen

from the album Sheezus
- Released: 10 March 2014
- Studio: Echo (Los Angeles)
- Genre: Synth-pop
- Length: 4:20
- Label: Parlophone
- Songwriters: Lily Allen; Greg Kurstin
- Producer: Greg Kurstin

Lily Allen singles chronology
"Air Balloon" (2014)	"Our Time" (2014)	"URL Badman" (2014)

Music video
- "Our Time" on YouTube

"Our Time" is a song by English singer Lily Allen from her third studio album, Sheezus (2014). The song was released on 10 March 2014 as the album's third single.

== Background ==
Allen released her second album, It's Not Me, It's You, in 2009, which saw a genre shift to synth-pop, rather than the ska and reggae influences used in her debut album, Alright, Still (2006). The album debuted at number one on the UK Albums Chart and the Australian Albums Chart and was well received by critics, noting the singer's musical evolution and maturity. It spawned the hit singles "The Fear" and "Fuck You", popular mostly in Europe. Allen and Amy Winehouse were credited with starting a process that led to the media-proclaimed "year of the women" in 2009, which saw five female artists making music of "experimentalism and fearlessness" nominated for the Mercury Prize.

In 2009, Allen announced that she would be taking a hiatus from musical activities. The following year, she opened a fashion rental shop named Lucy in Disguise with her sister Sarah, followed by the 2011 launching of her own record label.

In 2013, Allen revealed that she had begun working on her third studio album Sheezus. On 20 June 2012, Allen tweeted that she was in the studio working with Greg Kurstin on new music. She changed her professional name from Lily Allen to Lily Rose Cooper. In August 2013, she changed her professional name back to Allen and tweeted new music would be arriving "soon".

== Commercial performance ==
Upon its release, Our Time debuted at 43 on the UK Singles Chart. The single also peaked at number sixty on the Australian Singles Chart. The single failed to match the success Allen's previous singles "Hard out Here" and "Air Balloon" which both reached the top ten.

== Music video ==
The music video for Our Time premiered on YouTube on 10 March 2014. It features Lily Allen with several of her friends (all played by Allen) enjoying a night out, whilst taking a taxi across London.

== Charts ==
Chart (2014)	Peak position
Australia (ARIA)	60
Scotland Singles (Official Charts)	48
UK Singles (Official Charts)	43
