= Sheezus (song) =

Promotional single by Lily Allen

from the album Sheezus
- Released: 23 April 2014
- Recorded: 2013
- Studio: Arcadium (Los Angeles)
- Genre: Pop
- Length: 3:54
- Label: Parlophone
- Songwriters: Lily Allen; Dacoury Natche
- Producer: DJ Dahi

Lily Allen promotional singles chronology
Back to the Start (2009)	Sheezus (2014)

Music video
- "Sheezus" on YouTube

"Sheezus" is a song by English singer Lily Allen, released as a promotional single from her third studio album of the same name (2014). It was released alongside its music video on 23 April 2014 ahead of its planned release date of 28 April due to it being leaked. Parlophone later announced that "Sheezus" would not be released as an official single.

== Background ==
Allen released her second album, It's Not Me, It's You, in 2009, which saw a genre shift to synth-pop, rather than the ska and reggae influences used on her debut album, Alright, Still (2006). In 2009, Allen announced that she would be taking a hiatus from musical activities. The following year, she opened a fashion rental shop named Lucy in Disguise with her sister Sarah, followed by the 2011 launching of her own record label. In 2013, Allen revealed that she had begun working on her third studio album Sheezus. On 20 June 2012, Allen tweeted that she was in the studio working with Greg Kurstin on new music. She changed her professional name from Lily Allen to Lily Rose Cooper. In August 2013, she changed her professional name back to Allen and tweeted new music would be arriving "soon".

Allen initially said that her record label would not allow the release of "Sheezus" as an official single because the song was "not up-tempo enough" and contained the word "period". Allen continued to comment on the matter saying her label wanted to release radio friendly songs such as "Air Balloon", which Allen called "docile pop" and said they were chosen because labels and radio stations "won't play the better stuff". The song contains references to American singers Beyoncé, Katy Perry, and Lady Gaga, as well as Barbadian singer Rihanna and New Zealand singer Lorde.

== Critical reception ==
Upon release the song was met with polarized reviews from music critics. Jason Lipshutz of Billboard praised the song for being "anti-pop", continuing to call it a "sarcastic pop anthem". Time magazine praised the song and Allen for wanting "her ladies to unite in bringing their A-game." Radhika Sanghani of The Daily Telegraph on the other hand said that " ultimately, Allen's message itself is confused. It seems like she is trying to join Katy Perry and Queen B in jumping onto the feminist pop movement[...] it's just a shame that she's doing it so obviously we can recognise it."

== Charts ==
Chart performance for "Sheezus"
Chart (2014)	Peak position
UK Singles (OCC)	113

== Release history ==
Release history for "Sheezus"
Region	Date	Format	Label
United Kingdom	23 April 2014	Digital download	Parlophone
