= Hard out Here (Lily Allen song) =

2013 single by Lily Allen

Single by Lily Allen

from the album Sheezus
- B-side: "Somewhere Only We Know"
- Released: 17 November 2013
- Recorded: 2013
- Studio: Echo Studio (Los Angeles)
- Genre: Synth-pop
- Length: 3:31
- Label: Parlophone
- Songwriters: Lily Allen; Greg Kurstin
- Producer: Greg Kurstin

Lily Allen singles chronology
"Somewhere Only We Know" (2013)	"Hard out Here" (2013)	"Air Balloon" (2014)

Music video
- "Hard out Here" on YouTube

"Hard out Here" is a song by English singer Lily Allen, released on 17 November 2013 as the lead single from her third studio album, Sheezus (2014). Allen co-wrote the song with its producer, Greg Kurstin. Musically, "Hard out Here" is a synth-pop song with lyrics revolving around "body image pressures and misogyny in the entertainment industry".

"Hard out Here" was critically acclaimed; many critics praised its lyrical content and praised Allen's take on the industry, dubbing the song a "feminist anthem through and through". According to The Wire, the title is a "thinly veiled reference" to Three 6 Mafia's Academy Award-winning 2005 song "It's Hard out Here for a Pimp". The song topped the Austrian chart and reached the top 10 in the United Kingdom, Germany and Switzerland.

To promote the song, Allen performed at YoYos pod in London. The music video for the song was directed by Christopher Sweeney and premiered on Allen's website on 12 November 2013. The video depicts Allen receiving liposuction and twerking. The video received positive reviews from most critics, but also sparked minor controversy over the ethnicity of the backing dancers.

== Background ==
Allen released her second album It's Not Me, It's You in 2009, which saw a genre shift to synth-pop, rather than the ska and reggae influences used in her debut album, Alright, Still (2006). The album debuted at number one on the UK Albums Chart and the Australian Albums Chart and was well received by critics, noting the singer's musical evolution and maturity. It spawned the hit singles "The Fear" and "Fuck You", popular mostly in Europe. Allen and Amy Winehouse were credited with starting a process that led to the media-proclaimed "year of the women" in 2009 that has seen five female artists making music of "experimentalism and fearlessness" nominated for the Mercury Prize.

In 2009, Allen announced that she would be taking a hiatus from musical activities. The following year, she opened a fashion rental shop named Lucy in Disguise with her sister Sarah, followed by the 2011 launching of her own record label.

In 2013, Allen revealed that she had begun working on her third studio album Sheezus. On 20 June 2012, Allen tweeted that she was in the studio working with Greg Kurstin on new music. She changed her professional name from Lily Allen to Lily Rose Cooper. In August 2013 she changed her professional name back to Lily Allen and tweeted new music would be arriving "soon".

== Composition and lyrical interpretation ==
"Hard out Here" was written by Allen and Greg Kurstin, with production handled by the latter. Lasting for three minutes and twenty two seconds, musically "Hard out Here" is a "typically outspoken, sweary" synth-pop song. Lyrically, it speaks about "body image pressures and misogyny in the entertainment industry". The song's verses introduce the concept of the song: "You should probably lose some weight 'cause we can't see your bones/ You should probably fix your face or you'll end up on your own." The overall message of the song, as well as several individual lyrics, have been interpreted as a response to Robin Thicke's "Blurred Lines", as well as Thicke and Miley Cyrus's performance at the 2013 MTV Video Music Awards and Cyrus's music video "We Can't Stop". However, Allen has said with regard to people's description of "Hard out Here" as a "We Can't Stop" parody that "I never went on record saying the video was a direct pop at her—it wasn't."

== Critical reception ==
"Hard out Here" received critical acclaim upon release. Rolling Stone praised the song calling it a "feminist anthem through and through" and praised the subjects in which Allen tackles including "tired gender roles and expectations to double standards regarding sex and appearance for men and women". Lewis Corner of Digital Spy rated the song four out of five stars, calling it "a welcome return to music for Lily Allen" and stating, "Ever the ambassador for a social critique, [Allen] wasn't going to let 2013 end without having her say on the current objectification of women in pop—and that includes poking fun at that twerking malarky." The Wire viewed the song's title as a "thinly veiled reference" to Three 6 Mafia's Academy Award-winning 2005 song "It's Hard out Here for a Pimp".

== Commercial performance ==
"Hard out Here" debuted at number nine on the UK Singles Chart, selling 30,213 copies in its first week, giving Allen two simultaneous top ten singles (the other being Somewhere Only We Know which was at the peak of the chart that week). The single was notably successful in Austria, Germany, and Switzerland, where it peaked at number 1, 2, and 6 respectively. In these three countries, it was used as the title song for the eighth season of Ich bin ein Star – Holt mich hier raus!, the German-language version of the reality TV show I'm a Celebrity...Get Me Out of Here!. In Oceania the song made its debut on the New Zealand Singles Chart at number 30 on 25 November 2013, peaking at number 14 the following week.

== Music video ==
=== Background and synopsis ===
The music video was directed by Christopher Sweeney. The music video for the song was premiered on Allen's website on 12 November 2013, with fans being able to unlock it by answering questions. Allen asked for fans to give feedback with the hashtag #HOH. It starts with Allen undergoing liposuction wearing full makeup. Her male manager says "Letterman says no", a reference to David Letterman. She asks him about Kimmel. He asks, "Jesus, how could somebody let themselves get like this". She defends herself saying "Um, I had two babies" (a reference to the birth of Allen's daughters in 2011 and 2013), but he and a doctor ignore her and continue talking about her as if she is not there. Allen begins to mime and then jumps off the operating table. Then she removes her hospital gown and begins a synchronised dance routine with six scantily clad female dancers. Allen's manager appears, demonstrating to the women that they should twerk. The scene cuts to Allen in front of a kitchen sink, scrubbing a chrome rim as if it were a dish. The video later references the music video for Robin Thicke's "Blurred Lines", with balloons spelling out "LILY ALLEN HAS A BAGGY PUSSY". The video was accompanied by a parental advisory explicit sign for sexually explicit content. On 26 November, Allen released a video featuring behind the scenes footage from the "Hard out Here" video of her learning to twerk and talking to the backing dancers.

=== Reception and controversy ===
The video is meant to be a lighthearted satirical video that deals with objectification of women within modern pop culture. It has nothing to do with race, at all.

— — Allen, commenting on the controversy surrounding the video.

The video received positive feedback on Twitter from celebrities Adele, Ellie Goulding, Tinie Tempah, Rebecca Ferguson, Professor Green, Foxes, Caitlin Moran, Lena Dunham, Lauren Laverne, Example, Piers Morgan, Kesha, Jake Shears, Charli XCX, Mark Ronson, and Pink. It amassed 2.2 million views within two days of being uploaded.

The video's use of black backing dancers was criticised on the grounds of racism. Allen responded to this with a long message called "Privilege, Superiority and Misconceptions", in which she refused to apologise, "because I think that would imply that I'm guilty of something". She said that "If I could dance like the ladies can, it would have been my arse on your screens; I actually rehearsed for two weeks trying to perfect my twerk, but failed miserably. If I was a little braver, I would have been wearing a bikini too, but I do not and I have chronic cellulite, which nobody wants to see." Jameela Jamil defended the video, saying that those who have discounted the white dancers in the video are "almost racist" themselves, saying, "It's just a bunch of women from all backgrounds dancing provocatively as they have for years" and opining that the "parody" video makes "the obvious point that women are exploited in music videos."

In response to criticism by "misogynistic, hipster, male bloggers", Allen wrote the song "URL Badman".

In 2016, Allen apologized for the video, citing its cultural appropriation. She told BBC Radio 1 DJ Annie Mac that her intention behind the video was to make a feminist statement but "I was guilty of thinking ― assuming ― that there was a one-size-fits-all where feminism is concerned." She added that the controversy encouraged her to "do more research and strive to keep putting out music."

== Promotion ==
On 14 November 2013, Allen made her debut live performance of "Hard out Here" in the YoYos pod at the Red Bull Revolutions in Sound event on the London Eye. The song was chosen as the opening theme of the eighth season of the German reality television series Ich bin ein Star – Holt mich hier raus!, which premiered on 17 January 2014, the same date as the single's release in Germany.

== Track listings ==
- Digital download
1. "Hard out Here" – 3:31
- Germany, Austria and Switzerland CD single
1. "Hard out Here" – 3:31
2. "Somewhere Only We Know" – 3:28

== Personnel ==
Credits adapted from CD single liner notes.

- Lily Allen – songwriting, vocals
- Greg Kurstin – bass, drums, keyboards, mixing, piano, production, songwriting
- Alex Pasco – assistant engineering
- Geoff Pesche – mastering

== Charts ==
=== Weekly charts ===
Weekly chart performance for "Hard Out Here"
Chart (2013–14)	Peak position
Australia (ARIA)	14
Austria (Ö3 Austria Top 40)	1
Belgium (Ultratop 50 Flanders)	24
Belgium (Ultratop 50 Wallonia)	29
Czech Republic Airplay (ČNS IFPI)	17
Denmark (Tracklisten)	36
Europe (Euro Digital Songs)	12
Finnish Downloads (Latauslista)	28
Finland Airplay (Radiosoittolista)	20
France (SNEP)	78
Germany (GfK)	2
Ireland (IRMA)	21
Italy (FIMI)	14
Japan Hot 100 (Billboard)	92
Netherlands (Dutch Top 40)	32
Netherlands (Single Top 100)	58
New Zealand (Recorded Music NZ)	14
Scotland Singles (Official Charts)	12
Slovakia Airplay (ČNS IFPI)	50
Slovenia (SloTop50)	19
Spain (Promusicae)	32
Switzerland (Schweizer Hitparade)	6
UK Singles (Official Charts)	9
US Bubbling Under Hot 100 (Billboard)	6

=== Year-end charts ===
Annual chart rankings for "Hard Out Here"
Chart (2014)	Position
Germany (Official German Charts)	52
Italy (Musica e dischi)	91
Netherlands (Dutch Top 40)	194

== Certifications ==
Region	Certification	Certified units/sales
Australia (ARIA)	Platinum	70,000^{^}
Germany (BVMI)	Gold	150,000^{^}
Italy (FIMI)	Gold	15,000^{‡}
New Zealand (RMNZ)	Gold	7,500^{*}
United Kingdom (BPI)	Silver	200,000^{‡}
^{*} Sales figures based on certification alone.^{^} Shipments figures based on certification alone.^{‡} Sales+streaming figures based on certification alone.

== Release history ==
Region	Date	Format	Label	Ref.
Australia	17 November 2013	Digital download	Warner	
Germany	17 November 2013	Digital download	Warner	
Ireland	17 November 2013	Digital download	Parlophone	
United Kingdom	17 November 2013	Digital download	Parlophone	
United States	17 November 2013	Digital download	Parlophone	
France	18 November 2013	Digital download	Warner	
Germany	17 January 2014	CD single	Warner	
