= Air Balloon (song) =

2014 single by Lily Allen

Single by Lily Allen

from the album Sheezus
- Released: 2 March 2014
- Recorded: 2013
- Studio: MXM Studios (Stockholm)
- Genre: Bubblegum pop
- Length: 3:48
- Label: Parlophone
- Songwriters: Lily Allen; Shellback
- Producer: Shellback

Lily Allen singles chronology
"Hard out Here" (2013)	"Air Balloon" (2014)	"Our Time" (2014)

Music video
- "Air Balloon" on YouTube

"Air Balloon" is a song by English singer Lily Allen from her third studio album, Sheezus (2014). The song was premiered on BBC Radio 1 on 13 January 2014 and was released on 2 March 2014, as the album's second single. Allen co-wrote the song with Shellback, who produced the track.

== Background ==
Allen released her second album, It's Not Me, It's You, in 2009, which saw a genre shift to synth-pop, rather than the ska and reggae influences used in her debut album, Alright, Still (2006). The album debuted at number one on the UK Albums Chart and the Australian Albums Chart and was well received by critics, noting the singer's musical evolution and maturity. It spawned five hit singles including "The Fear", "Not Fair" and "Fuck You". Allen and Amy Winehouse were credited with starting a process that led to the media-proclaimed "year of the women" in 2009 that has seen five female artists making music of "experimentalism and fearlessness" nominated for the Mercury Prize.

In 2009, Allen announced that she would be taking a hiatus from musical activities. The following year, she opened a fashion rental shop named Lucy in Disguise with her sister Sarah, followed by the 2011 launching of her own record label. In 2013, Allen revealed that she had begun working on her third studio album Sheezus. On 20 June 2012, Allen tweeted that she was in the studio working with Greg Kurstin on new music. She changed her professional name from Lily Allen to Lily Rose Cooper. In August 2013, she changed her professional name back to Lily Allen and tweeted new music would be arriving "soon".

Following the release of Sheezus, Allen experienced an identity crisis and opined that she had lost agency to her label, Parlophone. In 2018, Allen described "Air Balloon" as her least favourite song, and agreed with a fan who suggested that it "stunk of label pressure as a lead single".

== Composition ==
"Air Balloon" is described by Billboard as "more of a loopy lullaby than a slice of social commentary", with a nonchalant Allen singing, "Come meet me in the sky, I'll be waiting for you/And we can't hear what they say/Up in my air balloon, air balloon, air balloon." The song gets its toy piano arrangement, creaseless beat and offbeat Kurt Cobain shout-out partially from Shellback.

== Music video ==
The official music video for "Air Balloon" was released on Allen's official channel on YouTube on 7 February without prior notice, after the release of "L8 CMMR" for HBO's hit drama Girls, and two weeks after the release of the official lyric video on the same channel. The video was directed by That Go (Noel Paul and Stefan Moore) and shot in Cape Town, South Africa, and Gloucestershire, United Kingdom.

The video shows Allen singing in a green safari field, changing the camera's point-of-view, and launching the camera into space. She relaxes on a couch with a few middle-aged men, interacts with a zebra and a cheetah, and dances in a field of giant growing mushrooms. Allen is later shown floating in space with a giant crucifix, filmed as to make a reference to the name of her album, "Sheezus".

== Critical reception ==
The song received positive reviews from music critics, who praised the song for being catchy, although some criticised its similarity to that of the work of other artists, particularly M.I.A. Digital Spy awarded the song 3/5 stars, stating the songs hook is "packed to the brim with ear-snagging but nonsensical lyrics", but that it was lacking "the personal touch that usually makes Allen's songs so distinctive and relatable." Pure FM gave the song a positive review, awarding the song 4/5 stars and calling it an 'extremely infectious and catchy track." Rolling Stone called the song "a poppy, synth-heavy cut that shows off the singer's playful and funny sides." The Mirror said the song was "completely infectious and memorable in the best way." The song was likened to M.I.A.'s 2008 hit "Paper Planes". Some people have gone as far as to call it a "rip-off", mainly due to the accent used in the introduction and the "na-na-na-na" hook, which M.I.A. regularly uses in her music. It is unclear whether this is intentional or not.

== Live performances ==
During an interview with Graham Norton on The Graham Norton Show on 21 February 2014, Allen performed "Air Balloon".

== Chart performance ==
"Air Balloon" was moderately successful charting at number 7 on the UK Singles Chart, making it her seventh top-ten single in the country, and number 8 in Ireland. Throughout Europe the single managed to chart within the top 10 in countries such as Belgium and Scotland, at number 3 and 9. In Germany, Austria and Switzerland the song was less successful charting at number 40, 68 and 65 respectively.

In Oceania the single achieved success in Australia charting at number 15 and eventually being certified gold by ARIA for sales over 35,000. In New Zealand the single charted at number 30 becoming Allen's lowest peak in that country.

== Track listings ==
- Limited Edition 7" Vinyl
1. "Air Balloon" – 3:48
2. "Hard Out Here" – 3:31
- Digital download
1. "Air Balloon" – 3:48
- Digital remixes
1. "Air Balloon" – 3:48
2. "Air Balloon" (Taiki & Nulight Vocal Remix) – 5:42
3. "Air Balloon" (Taiki & Nulight Dub Remix) – 5:44
4. "Air Balloon" (Digital Farm Animals Remix) – 4:29

== Charts ==
Weekly chart performance for "Air Balloon"
Chart (2014)	Peak position
Australia (ARIA)	15
Austria (Ö3 Austria Top 40)	68
Belgium (Ultratip Bubbling Under Flanders)	6
Belgium (Ultratip Bubbling Under Wallonia)	3
Euro Digital Song Sales (Billboard)	14
Finland Airplay (Radiosoittolista)	71
Germany (GfK)	40
Ireland (IRMA)	8
Japan Hot 100 (Billboard)	58
New Zealand (Recorded Music NZ)	30
Scotland Singles (Official Charts)	9
South Korea (Gaon International Chart)	38
Switzerland (Schweizer Hitparade)	65
UK Singles (Official Charts)	7

Annual chart rankings for "Air Balloon"
Chart (2014)	Rank
Japan Adult Contemporary (Billboard)	39

== Certifications ==
Region	Certification	Certified units/sales
Australia (ARIA)	Gold	35,000^{^}
United Kingdom (BPI)	Silver	200,000^{‡}
^{^} Shipments figures based on certification alone.

== Release history ==
Region	Date	Format(s)	Label
Norway	31 January 2014	Digital download	Parlophone
United States	2 February 2014	Digital download	Parlophone
France	2 February 2014	Digital download	Parlophone
Italy	2 February 2014	Digital download	Parlophone
New Zealand	2 February 2014	Digital download	Parlophone
Brazil	2 February 2014	Digital download	Warner Music Group
United Kingdom	3 February 2014	Contemporary hit radio	Parlophone
Australia	14 February 2014	Digital download	Parlophone
Ireland	28 February 2014	Digital download	Parlophone
United Kingdom	2 March 2014	Digital download	Parlophone
